= 1966 Michigan House of Representatives election =

- November 8, 1966

All 110 seats in the Michigan House of Representatives 56 seats needed for a majority
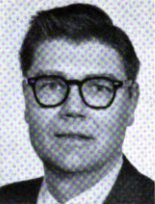

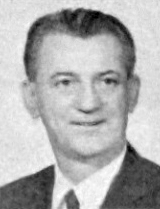
	Majority party	Minority party
Leader	Robert E. Waldron	Joseph J. Kowalski
Party	Republican	Democratic
Leader since	1965	1959
Leader's seat	1st district	19th district
Last election	37	73
Seats after	55	55
Seat change	▲18	▼18
Popular vote	1,192,086	1,125,713
Percentage	51.43%	48.56%
Speaker before election
Joseph J. Kowalski
Democratic
Elected Speaker
Robert E. Waldron
Republican

An election was held on November 8, 1966, to elect all 110 members of the Michigan House of Representatives for the 74th Michigan Legislature. The election resulted in an even 55–55 split of Democrats and Republicans, from what had previously been a Democratic majority. Republicans were able to elect their own speaker of the state House and gain control when one Democrat, E. D. O'Brien, abstained from the speaker election.

== History ==
Initial results for the 1964 general election showed that the Democrats won a 72–38 majority from what had been a Republican majority. A recount in January 1965 gave the Democrats one more seat, but they had lost two. One was due due to the death of William Hyso in December 1964. The other was due to Daniel W. West going under investigation, and ultimately not being seated due to falsifying his identity. Democrat James H. Karoub won the April special election to replace Hyso and Democrat James Del Rio won the May special election to replace West. This resulted in a 73–37 Democratic majority.

The 1966 state primary was held on August 2. There were 38 incumbents, 14 Democrats and 24 Republicans, were re-elected unopposed. Five incumbents did not seek re-election. There were nine incumbents defeated in the primaries. The Democrats were Maxcine Young, Edward K. Michalski, John J. Fitzpatrick, William H. Thorne, Ray M. Flavin, and James K. Constantini. They were defeated by Jackie Vaughn III, Michael Novak, Frank V. Wierzbicki, Alex Pilch, James N. Callahan, and Jack Gingrass, respectively. The Republicans were Rollo G. Conlin, Homer Arnett, and Clayton T. Morrison. They were defeated by Robert C. Stites, William V. Weber, and Bob Davis, respectively.

The general election was held on November 8. The election resulted in an even 55–55 split of Democrats and Republicans in the state House. Republicans gained 18 seats, with 18 incumbent Democrats being defeated.

In November, the House Democrats formulated a joint leadership plan, to elect co-speakers to preside over the chamber. The plan was rejected by House Republicans. Republicans chose Robert E. Waldron as their candidate for speaker of the House in a caucus on December 7. Democrats chose their candidate on January 10, 1967, in a caucus. Initially, incumbent Speaker Joseph J. Kowalski wanted to run, however, one Democrat, E. D. O'Brien, opposed Kowalski's candidacy. In response, Kowalski dropped out of the running, and William A. Ryan was selected as the Democratic candidate instead. The state House was sworn in on January 11. The same day, Waldron was elected speaker of the House by a vote of 55–54, the one abstention being O'Brien. This gave Republicans control of the mixed chamber. Kowalski was chosen as Democratic floor leader.

== Results ==
The following are the official results from the 1967–1968 Michigan Manual. The official results purposefully excluded scattered write-in votes.

=== Statewide ===
Party	Candi- dates	Votes		Seats		
Party	Candi- dates	No.	%	No.	+/–	%
Republican Party	110	1,192,086	51.43%	55	▲18	50.00%
Democratic Party	110	1,125,713	48.56%	55	▼18	50.00%
Total	220	2,317,799	100.00%	110	Steady	100.00%

=== By district ===
1st District (Wayne County)
Party	Candidate	Votes	%
Republican	Robert E. Waldron (incumbent)	23,019	78.50
Democratic	Manuel Mike L. Papista	6,301	21.49
Total votes		29,320	100.0
Republican hold			

2nd District (Wayne County)
Party	Candidate	Votes	%
Democratic	James H. Karoub (incumbent)	14,097	76.88
Republican	Margaret Tenerowicz	4,239	23.11
Total votes		18,336	100.0
Democratic hold			

3rd District (Wayne County)
Party	Candidate	Votes	%
Democratic	William A. Ryan (incumbent)	9,700	67.20
Republican	Curtis R. Jacobson	4,733	32.79
Total votes		14,433	100.0
Democratic hold			

4th District (Wayne County)
Party	Candidate	Votes	%
Democratic	William B. Fitzgerald (incumbent)	10,572	52.95
Republican	Donald K. Pierce	9,391	47.04
Total votes		19,963	100.0
Democratic hold			

5th District (Wayne County)
Party	Candidate	Votes	%
Democratic	E. D. O'Brien (incumbent)	12,603	59.26
Republican	Robert J. Frost	8,663	40.73
Total votes		21,266	100.0
Democratic hold			

6th District (Wayne County)
Party	Candidate	Votes	%
Democratic	Robert Mahoney (incumbent)	15,493	73.19
Republican	William E. Trombley	5,675	26.80
Total votes		21,168	100.0
Democratic hold			

7th District (Wayne County)
Party	Candidate	Votes	%
Democratic	Stephen Stopczynski (incumbent)	13,849	80.70
Republican	Victor S. Wierzbicki	3,312	19.29
Total votes		17,161	100.0
Democratic hold			

8th District (Wayne County)
Party	Candidate	Votes	%
Democratic	James Bradley (incumbent)	12,805	90.17
Republican	Jimmie Lee Sumpter Jr.	1,395	9.82
Total votes		14,200	100.0
Democratic hold			

9th District (Wayne County)
Party	Candidate	Votes	%
Democratic	Rosetta A. Ferguson (incumbent)	9,235	73.05
Republican	Thomas I. Ahart	3,407	26.94
Total votes		12,642	100.0
Democratic hold			

10th District (Wayne County)
Party	Candidate	Votes	%
Democratic	David S. Holmes Jr. (incumbent)	9,395	89.76
Republican	Lorraine Lawrence	1,071	10.23
Total votes		10,466	100.0
Democratic hold			

11th District (Wayne County)
Party	Candidate	Votes	%
Democratic	Thomas W. White (incumbent)	6,603	74.38
Republican	William L. Magill	2,274	25.61
Total votes		8,877	100.0
Democratic hold			

12th District (Wayne County)
Party	Candidate	Votes	%
Democratic	George H. Edwards (incumbent)	12,420	87.65
Republican	Gerard O. White	1,749	12.34
Total votes		14,169	100.0
Democratic hold			

13th District (Wayne County)
Party	Candidate	Votes	%
Democratic	Michael Novak	15,382	84.95
Republican	Edward R. Cartwright	2,725	15.04
Total votes		18,107	100.0
Democratic hold			

14th District (Wayne County)
Party	Candidate	Votes	%
Democratic	Raymond W. Hood (incumbent)	13,039	67.50
Republican	Martin A. Brennan	6,277	32.49
Total votes		19,316	100.0
Democratic hold			

15th District (Wayne County)
Party	Candidate	Votes	%
Democratic	Jack Faxon (incumbent)	15,841	69.35
Republican	Robert S. Levine	6,999	30.64
Total votes		22,840	100.0
Democratic hold			

16th District (Wayne County)
Party	Candidate	Votes	%
Democratic	Josephine D. Hunsinger (incumbent)	11,544	52.20
Republican	Michael L. Stacey	10,568	47.79
Total votes		22,112	100.0
Democratic hold			

17th District (Wayne County)
Party	Candidate	Votes	%
Republican	J. Harold Stevens (incumbent)	13,701	59.59
Democratic	Jack E. Legel	9,290	40.40
Total votes		22,991	100.0
Republican hold			

18th District (Wayne County)
Party	Candidate	Votes	%
Democratic	Leonard S. Walton (incumbent)	12,542	67.26
Republican	William Berdell Brakeville	6,103	32.73
Total votes		18,645	100.0
Democratic hold			

19th District (Wayne County)
Party	Candidate	Votes	%
Democratic	Joseph J. Kowalski (incumbent)	12,126	61.12
Republican	Leo Van DerZeil	7,713	38.87
Total votes		19,839	100.0
Democratic hold			

20th District (Wayne County)
Party	Candidate	Votes	%
Democratic	George F. Montgomery Sr. (incumbent)	11,869	67.46
Republican	Norman R. Williams	5,723	32.53
Total votes		17,592	100.0
Democratic hold			

21st District (Wayne County)
Party	Candidate	Votes	%
Democratic	George F. Montgomery Jr. (incumbent)	13,425	76.30
Republican	John I. Vernon	4,170	23.69
Total votes		17,595	100.0
Democratic hold			

22nd District (Wayne County)
Party	Candidate	Votes	%
Democratic	Daisy Elliott (incumbent)	14,272	93.31
Republican	Markus S. Simon	1,023	6.68
Total votes		15,295	100.0
Democratic hold			

23rd District (Wayne County)
Party	Candidate	Votes	%
Democratic	Jackie Vaughn III	14,864	92.53
Republican	Thomas C. Wimberly Jr.	1,199	7.46
Total votes		16,063	100.0
Democratic hold			

24th District (Wayne County)
Party	Candidate	Votes	%
Democratic	James Del Rio (incumbent)	8,038	82.84
Republican	Manuel Reyes	1,665	17.15
Total votes		9,703	100.0
Democratic hold			

25th District (Wayne County)
Party	Candidate	Votes	%
Democratic	Frank V. Wierzbicki	11,754	81.41
Republican	Toney T. Hernandez	2,684	18.58
Total votes		14,438	100.0
Democratic hold			

26th District (Wayne County)
Party	Candidate	Votes	%
Democratic	Matthew McNeely (incumbent)	12,588	83.01
Republican	Irene E. Logan	2,575	16.98
Total votes		15,163	100.0
Democratic hold			

27th District (Wayne County)
Party	Candidate	Votes	%
Democratic	William R. Copeland (incumbent)	12,832	67.54
Republican	Leo E. Stevenson Jr.	6,167	32.45
Total votes		18,999	100.0
Democratic hold			

28th District (Wayne County)
Party	Candidate	Votes	%
Democratic	Thomas J. Anderson (incumbent)	12,466	63.12
Republican	Helen E. Brakonecke	7,283	36.87
Total votes		19,749	100.0
Democratic hold			

29th District (Wayne County)
Party	Candidate	Votes	%
Democratic	Alfred A. Sheridan (incumbent)	10,570	59.09
Republican	Kenneth C. Evans	7,317	40.90
Total votes		17,887	100.0
Democratic hold			

30th District (Wayne County)
Party	Candidate	Votes	%
Democratic	Joyce Symons (incumbent)	13,109	62.53
Republican	Laura M. Mapes	7,853	37.46
Total votes		20,962	100.0
Democratic hold			

31st District (Wayne County)
Party	Candidate	Votes	%
Democratic	Lucille H. McCollough (incumbent)	16,549	66.28
Republican	Louis A. Sanderson	8,418	33.71
Total votes		24,967	100.0
Democratic hold			

32nd District (Wayne County)
Party	Candidate	Votes	%
Democratic	Alex Pilch	11,528	60.01
Republican	George Hodak	7,680	39.98
Total votes		19,208	100.0
Democratic hold			

33rd District (Wayne County)
Party	Candidate	Votes	%
Democratic	Richard A. Young (incumbent)	12,842	52.20
Republican	Eugene R. Wagner	11,755	47.79
Total votes		24,597	100.0
Democratic hold			

34th District (Wayne County)
Party	Candidate	Votes	%
Democratic	John Bennett (incumbent)	12,217	55.34
Republican	Robert J. Anderson	9,859	44.65
Total votes		22,076	100.0
Democratic hold			

35th District (Wayne County)
Party	Candidate	Votes	%
Republican	Louis E. Schmidt	14,480	54.08
Democratic	Marvin R. Stempien (incumbent)	12,292	45.91
Total votes		26,772	100.0
Republican gain from Democratic			

36th District (Wayne County)
Party	Candidate	Votes	%
Democratic	James Tierney (incumbent)	10,370	51.92
Republican	John E. Tripp Sr.	9,600	48.07
Total votes		19,970	100.0
Democratic hold			

37th District (Wayne County)
Party	Candidate	Votes	%
Democratic	Vincent J. Petitpren (incumbent)	10,226	68.27
Republican	Rosemary Moorehead	4,751	31.72
Total votes		14,977	100.0
Democratic hold			

38th District (Monroe County, Wayne County)
Party	Candidate	Votes	%
Democratic	Edward E. Mahalak (incumbent)	9,657	53.31
Republican	Althea Woods Amerman	8,456	46.68
Total votes		18,113	100.0
Democratic hold			

39th District (Monroe County)
Party	Candidate	Votes	%
Democratic	Raymond C. Kehres (incumbent)	10,951	52.30
Republican	Milton J. H. Knabusch	9,986	47.69
Total votes		20,937	100.0
Democratic hold			

40th District (Lenawee County)
Party	Candidate	Votes	%
Republican	Robert C. Stites	13,063	68.14
Democratic	Hugh Flippo	6,107	31.85
Total votes		19,170	100.0
Republican hold			

41st District (Branch County, Hillsdale County, Lenawee County)
Party	Candidate	Votes	%
Republican	Frederic J. Marshall (incumbent)	13,336	67.26
Democratic	Charles H. Miller	6,489	32.73
Total votes		19,825	100.0
Republican hold			

42nd District (Berrien County, Cass County, St. Joseph County)
Party	Candidate	Votes	%
Republican	DeForest Strang	12,282	62.64
Democratic	Charles J. LaSata	7,324	37.35
Total votes		19,606	100.0
Republican hold			

43rd District (Berrien County, Cass County)
Party	Candidate	Votes	%
Republican	Don R. Pears (incumbent)	16,183	71.53
Democratic	Laurel P. Groenke	6,438	28.46
Total votes		22,621	100.0
Republican hold			

44th District (Berrien County, Cass County)
Party	Candidate	Votes	%
Republican	Lionel J. Stacey	9,967	55.38
Democratic	Floyd J. Mattheeussen (incumbent)	8,028	44.61
Total votes		17,995	100.0
Republican gain from Democratic			

45th District (Calhoun County, Kalamazoo County, St. Joseph County)
Party	Candidate	Votes	%
Republican	James H. Heinze	13,669	62.12
Democratic	Howard Brighton	8,332	37.87
Total votes		22,001	100.0
Republican hold			

46th District (Kalamazoo County)
Party	Candidate	Votes	%
Republican	William V. Weber	12,318	62.43
Democratic	Nita Hardie	7,410	37.56
Total votes		19,728	100.0
Republican hold			

47th District (Kalamazoo County)
Party	Candidate	Votes	%
Republican	Cyril H. Root (incumbent)	14,680	61.28
Democratic	Robert B. Thomson	9,272	38.71
Total votes		23,952	100.0
Republican hold			

48th District (Calhoun County)
Party	Candidate	Votes	%
Republican	Gustave J. Groat Sr.	11,416	58.29
Democratic	W. Scott Ensign (incumbent)	8,166	41.70
Total votes		19,582	100.0
Republican gain from Democratic			

49th District (Calhoun County, Jackson County, Lenawee County)
Party	Candidate	Votes	%
Republican	James Folks (incumbent)	15,469	67.20
Democratic	Robert W. Cook	7,547	32.79
Total votes		23,016	100.0
Republican hold			

50th District (Jackson County)
Party	Candidate	Votes	%
Republican	Hal Ziegler	11,046	59.84
Democratic	Charles O. Conrad (incumbent)	7,413	40.15
Total votes		18,459	100.0
Republican gain from Democratic			

51st District (Lenawee County, Livingston County, Washtenaw County)
Party	Candidate	Votes	%
Republican	Thomas G. Sharpe (incumbent)	16,826	69.04
Democratic	Lloyd F. Hendee	7,542	30.95
Total votes		24,368	100.0
Republican hold			

52nd District (Washtenaw County)
Party	Candidate	Votes	%
Republican	Roy Smith	10,176	55.17
Democratic	Charles Fred Gray (incumbent)	8,266	44.82
Total votes		18,442	100.0
Republican gain from Democratic			

53rd District (Washtenaw County)
Party	Candidate	Votes	%
Republican	Raymond J. Smit	17,216	65.67
Democratic	Wallace W. Franklin	8,996	34.32
Total votes		26,212	100.0
Republican hold			

54th District (Allegan County, Van Buren County)
Party	Candidate	Votes	%
Republican	Edson V. Root Jr. (incumbent)	14,358	67.37
Democratic	Jules M. Serbenski Sr.	6,951	32.62
Total votes		21,309	100.0
Republican hold			

55th District (Allegan County, Barry County, Ottawa County)
Party	Candidate	Votes	%
Republican	James S. Farnsworth (incumbent)	18,065	75.00
Democratic	Harold W. Boone	6,020	24.99
Total votes		24,085	100.0
Republican hold			

56th District (Calhoun County, Eaton County)
Party	Candidate	Votes	%
Republican	Dale Warner	12,982	57.59
Democratic	Claude E. Burton (incumbent)	9,557	42.40
Total votes		22,539	100.0
Republican gain from Democratic			

57th District (Ingham County)
Party	Candidate	Votes	%
Republican	Thomas L. Brown	11,231	51.69
Democratic	H. James Starr (incumbent)	10,493	48.30
Total votes		21,724	100.0
Republican gain from Democratic			

58th District (Ingham County)
Party	Candidate	Votes	%
Republican	Philip O. Pittenger	13,515	54.22
Democratic	Robert Earl Dingwell (incumbent)	11,411	45.77
Total votes		24,926	100.0
Republican gain from Democratic			

59th District (Ingham County, Jackson County)
Party	Candidate	Votes	%
Republican	Charles J. Davis (incumbent)	16,364	73.23
Democratic	Wilton Goetz	5,982	26.76
Total votes		22,346	100.0
Republican hold			

60th District (Genesee County, Oakland County)
Party	Candidate	Votes	%
Republican	Clifford H. Smart (incumbent)	14,800	63.95
Democratic	Dwight R. Lawler	8,342	36.04
Total votes		23,142	100.0
Republican hold			

61st District (Oakland County)
Party	Candidate	Votes	%
Republican	Loren D. Anderson	13,451	58.20
Democratic	Francis A. Crowley (incumbent)	9,658	41.79
Total votes		23,109	100.0
Republican gain from Democratic			

62nd District (Oakland County)
Party	Candidate	Votes	%
Democratic	Arthur J. Law (incumbent)	10,450	63.59
Republican	JoAnn Van Tassel	5,983	36.40
Total votes		16,433	100.0
Democratic hold			

63rd District (Oakland County)
Party	Candidate	Votes	%
Republican	Donald E. Bishop	11,780	53.48
Democratic	Robert J. Slingerlend (incumbent)	10,244	46.51
Total votes		22,024	100.0
Republican gain from Democratic			

64th District (Oakland County)
Party	Candidate	Votes	%
Republican	Raymond L. Baker (incumbent)	20,721	70.59
Democratic	Leonard P. Baruch	8,631	29.40
Total votes		29,352	100.0
Republican hold			

65th District (Oakland County)
Party	Candidate	Votes	%
Republican	William P. Hampton (incumbent)	31,443	86.68
Democratic	John T. Rogers	4,829	13.31
Total votes		36,272	100.0
Republican hold			

66th District (Oakland County)
Party	Candidate	Votes	%
Democratic	Bill Huffman (incumbent)	9,915	55.46
Republican	Roy F. Strause	7,961	44.53
Total votes		17,876	100.0
Democratic hold			

67th District (Oakland County)
Party	Candidate	Votes	%
Democratic	Albert A. Kramer (incumbent)	15,290	60.40
Republican	Fred E. Wilson	10,023	39.59
Total votes		25,313	100.0
Democratic hold			

68th District (Oakland County)
Party	Candidate	Votes	%
Republican	William Hayward (incumbent)	16,261	68.29
Democratic	William M. Richards	7,549	31.70
Total votes		23,810	100.0
Republican hold			

69th District (Oakland County)
Party	Candidate	Votes	%
Democratic	Daniel S. Cooper (incumbent)	11,762	54.48
Republican	Max D. Hill	9,827	45.51
Total votes		21,589	100.0
Democratic hold			

70th District (Macomb County)
Party	Candidate	Votes	%
Democratic	John T. Kelsey (incumbent)	17,253	69.64
Republican	Herbert H. Wilson	7,518	30.35
Total votes		24,771	100.0
Democratic hold			

71st District (Macomb County)
Party	Candidate	Votes	%
Republican	Allen F. Rush	12,608	52.06
Democratic	Bruce L. Monks (incumbent)	11,608	47.93
Total votes		24,216	100.0
Republican gain from Democratic			

72nd District (Macomb County)
Party	Candidate	Votes	%
Democratic	Warren N. Goemaere (incumbent)	16,313	65.90
Republican	Harold Donaldson	8,438	34.09
Total votes		24,751	100.0
Democratic hold			

73rd District (Macomb County)
Party	Candidate	Votes	%
Democratic	Harold B. Clark (incumbent)	12,806	66.20
Republican	Charles D. Ross	6,537	33.79
Total votes		19,343	100.0
Democratic hold			

74th District (Macomb County)
Party	Candidate	Votes	%
Democratic	Joseph M. Snyder (incumbent)	12,232	59.44
Republican	George J. Korodan	8,344	40.55
Total votes		20,576	100.0
Democratic hold			

75th District (Macomb County, St. Clair County)
Party	Candidate	Votes	%
Republican	James S. Nunneley	10,179	55.54
Democratic	Victor R. Steeh (incumbent)	8,148	44.45
Total votes		18,327	100.0
Republican gain from Democratic			

76th District (St. Clair County)
Party	Candidate	Votes	%
Republican	William L. Jowett	13,942	68.27
Democratic	David J. Wright Jr.	6,477	31.72
Total votes		20,419	100.0
Republican hold			

77th District (Huron County, Sanilac County, St. Clair County)
Party	Candidate	Votes	%
Republican	Quincy P. Hoffman (incumbent)	16,724	71.88
Democratic	Charles R. Drummond	6,542	28.11
Total votes		23,266	100.0
Republican hold			

78th District (Huron County, Lapeer County, Tuscola County)
Party	Candidate	Votes	%
Republican	Roy L. Spencer (incumbent)	13,596	66.96
Democratic	Kenneth L. Kennedy	6,708	33.03
Total votes		20,304	100.0
Republican hold			

79th District (Genesee County)
Party	Candidate	Votes	%
Republican	James F. Smith (Note: There was a recount held in the 79th district in January 1967. The recount affirmed James F. Smith's victory.)	12,554	50.31
Democratic	Bobby Crim (incumbent)	12,397	49.68
Total votes		24,951	100.0
Republican gain from Democratic			

80th District (Genesee County)
Party	Candidate	Votes	%
Democratic	Edward Suski (incumbent)	11,969	63.93
Republican	Manley D. Thompson	6,751	36.06
Total votes		18,720	100.0
Democratic hold			

81st District (Genesee County)
Party	Candidate	Votes	%
Democratic	Dale Kildee (incumbent)	12,452	58.96
Republican	John Lich	8,665	41.03
Total votes		21,117	100.0
Democratic hold			

82nd District (Genesee County)
Party	Candidate	Votes	%
Democratic	Albert R. Horrigan (Note: There was a recount held in the 82nd district in January 1967. The recount affirmed Albert R. Horrigan's victory.) (incumbent)	10,341	50.24
Republican	Paul Calvin Visser	10,242	49.75
Total votes		20,583	100.0
Democratic hold			

83rd District (Genesee County)
Party	Candidate	Votes	%
Democratic	James N. Callahan	12,466	51.59
Republican	Stanley C. Perkins	11,697	48.40
Total votes		24,163	100.0
Democratic hold			

84th District (Saginaw County, Tuscola County)
Party	Candidate	Votes	%
Republican	Harry E. Rohlfs (incumbent)	13,537	64.64
Democratic	Lee Roy Clark	7,402	35.35
Total votes		20,939	100.0
Republican hold			

85th District (Saginaw County)
Party	Candidate	Votes	%
Democratic	James E. O'Neill Jr.	9,636	60.78
Republican	Robert D. Parson	6,216	39.21
Total votes		15,852	100.0
Democratic hold			

86th District (Saginaw County)
Party	Candidate	Votes	%
Republican	Carl O. Little (incumbent)	16,993	63.96
Democratic	Kenneth W. Rathje	9,574	36.03
Total votes		26,567	100.0
Republican hold			

87th District (Clinton County, Shiawassee County)
Party	Candidate	Votes	%
Republican	Blair G. Woodman (incumbent)	15,081	63.14
Democratic	Sanford Volker	8,803	36.85
Total votes		23,884	100.0
Republican hold			

88th District (Clinton County, Eaton County, Gratiot County, Midland County)
Party	Candidate	Votes	%
Republican	Lester J. Allen (incumbent)	12,266	64.50
Democratic	Joseph Hanus	6,749	35.49
Total votes		19,015	100.0
Republican hold			

89th District (Barry County, Ionia County, Kent County)
Party	Candidate	Votes	%
Republican	Stanley M. Powell (incumbent)	14,902	66.69
Democratic	Leo W. Barth	7,443	33.30
Total votes		22,345	100.0
Republican hold			

90th District (Kent County)
Party	Candidate	Votes	%
Republican	Martin D. Buth (incumbent)	17,270	69.12
Democratic	John R. Adams	7,714	30.87
Total votes		24,984	100.0
Republican hold			

91st District (Kent County)
Party	Candidate	Votes	%
Republican	Thomas G. Ford (incumbent)	22,813	77.19
Democratic	Paul A. Ward	6,739	22.80
Total votes		29,552	100.0
Republican hold			

92nd District (Kent County)
Party	Candidate	Votes	%
Democratic	Stanley J. Davis (incumbent)	11,034	56.17
Republican	F. Lange Montfort	8,609	43.82
Total votes		19,643	100.0
Democratic hold			

93rd District (Kent County)
Party	Candidate	Votes	%
Republican	Peter Kok (incumbent)	15,348	72.23
Democratic	George W. Crockett III	5,899	27.76
Total votes		21,247	100.0
Republican hold			

94th District (Kent County)
Party	Candidate	Votes	%
Republican	Johannes C. Kolderman Jr.	9,602	53.34
Democratic	George Sietsema (incumbent)	8,399	46.65
Total votes		18,001	100.0
Republican gain from Democratic			

95th District (Ottawa County)
Party	Candidate	Votes	%
Republican	Melvin DeStigter (incumbent)	19,573	74.01
Democratic	Thomas L. Garzelloni	6,873	25.98
Total votes		26,446	100.0
Republican hold			

96th District (Muskegon County)
Party	Candidate	Votes	%
Democratic	Francis W. Beedon (incumbent)	11,345	54.79
Republican	James J. Bolthouse	9,360	45.20
Total votes		20,705	100.0
Democratic hold			

97th District (Muskegon County)
Party	Candidate	Votes	%
Republican	Edgar A. Geerlings	13,092	55.52
Democratic	F. Charles Raap (incumbent)	10,485	44.47
Total votes		23,577	100.0
Republican gain from Democratic			

98th District (Lake County, Manistee County, Mason County, Muskegon County, Oceana County)
Party	Candidate	Votes	%
Republican	Dennis O. Cawthorne	14,480	55.68
Democratic	Eugene R. Cater (incumbent)	11,524	44.31
Total votes		26,004	100.0
Republican gain from Democratic			

99th District (Clare County, Mecosta County, Newaygo County, Osceola County)
Party	Candidate	Votes	%
Republican	Donald E. Holbrook Jr. (incumbent)	16,398	71.03
Democratic	Miller H. Durham	6,688	28.96
Total votes		23,086	100.0
Republican hold			

100th District (Isabella County, Montcalm County)
Party	Candidate	Votes	%
Republican	Russell H. Strange (incumbent)	12,650	61.89
Democratic	Donald R. Sandbrook	7,789	38.10
Total votes		20,439	100.0
Republican hold			

101st District (Bay County)
Party	Candidate	Votes	%
Democratic	J. Bob Traxler (incumbent)	11,826	57.38
Republican	Floyd C. Fischer	8,782	42.61
Total votes		20,608	100.0
Democratic hold			

102nd District (Arenac County, Bay County, Iosco County, Ogemaw County)
Party	Candidate	Votes	%
Republican	George Prescott	13,079	56.64
Democratic	Sanford E. Charron (incumbent)	10,009	43.35
Total votes		23,088	100.0
Republican gain from Democratic			

103rd District (Crawford County, Gladwin County, Midland County, Missaukee County, Roscommon County)
Party	Candidate	Votes	%
Republican	Nelson G. Tisdale (incumbent)	18,758	70.64
Democratic	Robert Wayne Miller	7,794	29.35
Total votes		26,552	100.0
Republican hold			

104th District (Benzie County, Grand Traverse County, Kalkaska County, Leelanau County, Missaukee County, Wexford County)
Party	Candidate	Votes	%
Republican	Arnell Engstrom (incumbent)	17,548	70.40
Democratic	Clinton Zinger	7,377	29.59
Total votes		24,925	100.0
Republican hold			

105th District (Alcona County, Alpena County, Cheboygan County, Montmorency County, Oscoda County, Presque Isle County)
Party	Candidate	Votes	%
Republican	Joseph Patrick Swallow (incumbent)	14,875	62.81
Democratic	Edward J. Bouchey	8,804	37.18
Total votes		23,679	100.0
Republican hold			

106th District (Antrim County, Charlevoix County, Chippewa County, Emmet County, Kalkaska County, Mackinac County, Otsego County)
Party	Candidate	Votes	%
Republican	Bob Davis	17,245	68.25
Democratic	Sidney Wizer	8,019	31.74
Total votes		25,264	100.0
Republican hold			

107th District (Chippewa County, Delta County, Luce County, Schoolcraft County)
Party	Candidate	Votes	%
Republican	Charles H. Varnum	11,106	53.18
Democratic	Einar E. Erlandsen (incumbent)	9,774	46.81
Total votes		20,880	100.0
Republican gain from Democratic			

108th District (Alger County, Baraga County, Delta County, Marquette County, Schoolcraft County)
Party	Candidate	Votes	%
Democratic	Dominic Jacobetti (incumbent)	12,949	60.43
Republican	C. Fred Rydholm	8,479	39.56
Total votes		21,428	100.0
Democratic hold			

109th District (Dickinson County, Gogebic County, Iron County, Marquette County, Menominee County)
Party	Candidate	Votes	%
Democratic	Jack Gingrass	13,153	51.14
Republican	James Goulette	12,566	48.85
Total votes		25,719	100.0
Democratic hold			

110th District (Gogebic County, Houghton County, Keweenaw County, Ontonagon County)
Party	Candidate	Votes	%
Democratic	Russell Hellman (incumbent)	14,530	55.62
Republican	Alfred Wright	11,593	44.37
Total votes		26,123	100.0
Democratic hold			

== See also ==
- 1966 Michigan Senate election
