= 1968 Michigan House of Representatives election =

- November 5, 1968

All 110 seats in the Michigan House of Representatives 56 seats needed for a majority
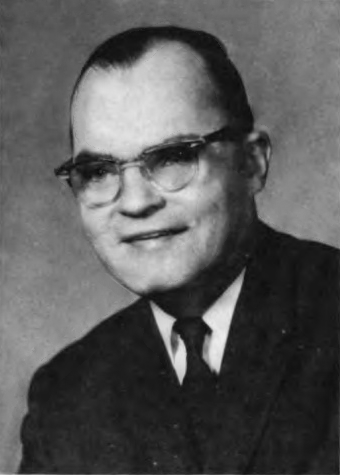

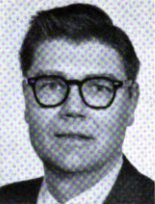
	Majority party	Minority party
Leader	William A. Ryan	Robert E. Waldron
Party	Democratic	Republican
Leader since	1967	1965
Leader's seat	3rd district	1st district
Last election	55	55
Seats before	54	55
Seats after	57	53
Seat change	▲3	▼2
Popular vote	1,571,338	1,425,683
Percentage	52.37%	47.52%
Speaker before election
Robert E. Waldron
Republican
Elected Speaker
William A. Ryan
Democratic

An election was held on November 5, 1968, to elect all 110 members of the Michigan House of Representatives for the 75th Michigan Legislature. In the election, the Democrats won a 57–53 majority from what had been a Republican-controlled chamber.

== History ==
In the 1966 general election, the state House was left with an even 55–55 split of Democrats and Republicans. Despite the even split of parties, Republicans were able to elect a House speaker and control the chamber due to a rule change and one Democrat abstaining from the leadership vote. That Democrat was E. D. O'Brien.

In March 1967, the Democratic House leader Joseph J. Kowalski died in office. William A. Ryan was elected to replace him as leader of the House Democrats. The special election to fill Kowalski's vacancy in May 1967 was won by Republican Anthony C. Licata. Due to another vacancy, caused by the death of Republican James S. Nunneley, this resulted in a 55–54 Republican majority in the state House. The election of Republican David M. Serotkin in June 1967 to replace Nunneley gave the Republicans a 56–54 Republican majority. The death of Republican Charles J. Davis in October 1968 left the state House at a 55–54 Republican majority before the November election.

The 1968 state primary was held on August 6. Three incumbents lost re-election. All three were Democrats. James Karoub was defeated by Ted Mrozowski. Francis W. Beedon was defeated by Gerrit C. Hasper. Thomas W. White was defeated by Nelis J. Saunders. Republican Charles J. Davis won the primary for re-election, but died in October, before the general election. The Jackson County and Ingham County Republican committees selected Jim N. Brown to replace him on the ballot.

The general election was held on November 5. The Democrats won a 57–53 majority from the Republicans. Five incumbents were ousted, 4 Republicans and 1 Democrat. Republicans Anthony C. Licata, Louis E. Schmidt, Allen F. Rush, and Johannes C. Kolderman Jr. were defeated by Democrats Casmer P. Ogonowski, Marvin R. Stempien, Thomas Guastello, and Jelt Sietsema, respectively. Democrat Jack Gingrass was defeated by Republican John D. Payant.

After the election, William A. Ryan was elected speaker of the state House. Republicans elected Robert E. Waldron as minority leader.

The state House was sworn in on January 8, 1969.

== Results ==
The following are the official results from the 1969–1970 Michigan Manual. The official results purposefully excluded scattered write-in votes.

=== Statewide ===
Party	Candi- dates	Votes		Seats		
Party	Candi- dates	No.	%	No.	+/–	%
Democratic Party	108	1,571,338	52.37%	57	▲3	51.81%
Republican Party	109	1,425,683	47.52%	53	▼2	48.18%
American Independent Party	1	3,133	0.10%	0	Steady	0.00%
Total	218	3,000,154	100.00%	110	Steady	100.00%

=== By district ===
1st District (Wayne County)
Party	Candidate	Votes	%
Republican	Robert E. Waldron (incumbent)	24,442	69.33
Democratic	Walter F. Collins	10,809	30.66
Total votes		35,251	100.0
Republican hold			

2nd District (Wayne County)
Party	Candidate	Votes	%
Democratic	Ted Mrozowski	17,789	83.37
Republican	Margaret A. Tenerowicz	3,548	16.62
Total votes		21,337	100.0
Democratic hold			

3rd District (Wayne County)
Party	Candidate	Votes	%
Democratic	William A. Ryan (incumbent)	14,598	76.11
Republican	Edgar W. Smith	4,580	23.88
Total votes		19,178	100.0
Democratic hold			

4th District (Wayne County)
Party	Candidate	Votes	%
Democratic	William B. Fitzgerald (incumbent)	15,952	61.68
Republican	Donald K. Pierce	9,909	38.31
Total votes		25,861	100.0
Democratic hold			

5th District (Wayne County)
Party	Candidate	Votes	%
Democratic	E. D. O'Brien (incumbent)	18,516	67.97
Republican	Ronald W. Michals	8,722	32.02
Total votes		27,238	100.0
Democratic hold			

6th District (Wayne County)
Party	Candidate	Votes	%
Democratic	Robert Mahoney (incumbent)	19,211	69.88
Republican	LaVerne F. Hopman	8,277	30.11
Total votes		27,488	100.0
Democratic hold			

7th District (Wayne County)
Party	Candidate	Votes	%
Democratic	Stephen Stopczynski (incumbent)	18,667	85.36
Republican	Victor S. Wierzbicki	3,201	14.63
Total votes		21,868	100.0
Democratic hold			

8th District (Wayne County)
Party	Candidate	Votes	%
Democratic	James Bradley (incumbent)	19,853	95.56
Republican	John J. Mathie	921	4.43
Total votes		20,774	100.0
Democratic hold			

9th District (Wayne County)
Party	Candidate	Votes	%
Democratic	Rosetta A. Ferguson (incumbent)	13,991	79.74
Republican	Louis R. Harrington	3,554	20.25
Total votes		17,545	100.0
Democratic hold			

10th District (Wayne County)
Party	Candidate	Votes	%
Democratic	David S. Holmes Jr. (incumbent)	13,027	93.78
Republican	Subirda H. Gatewood	864	6.21
Total votes		13,891	100.0
Democratic hold			

11th District (Wayne County)
Party	Candidate	Votes	%
Democratic	Nelis J. Saunders	9,447	80.22
Republican	Lee A. Greer	2,328	19.77
Total votes		11,775	100.0
Democratic hold			

12th District (Wayne County)
Party	Candidate	Votes	%
Democratic	George H. Edwards (incumbent)	18,599	92.86
Republican	Gerald O. White	1,428	7.13
Total votes		20,027	100.0
Democratic hold			

13th District (Wayne County)
Party	Candidate	Votes	%
Democratic	Michael Novak (incumbent)	21,595	89.76
Republican	Abraham M. Stevens	2,462	10.23
Total votes		24,057	100.0
Democratic hold			

14th District (Wayne County)
Party	Candidate	Votes	%
Democratic	Raymond W. Hood (incumbent)	20,268	79.47
Republican	Charles Wider	5,233	20.52
Total votes		25,501	100.0
Democratic hold			

15th District (Wayne County)
Party	Candidate	Votes	%
Democratic	Jack Faxon (incumbent)	24,129	80.94
Republican	Herbert Williams	5,680	19.05
Total votes		29,809	100.0
Democratic hold			

16th District (Wayne County)
Party	Candidate	Votes	%
Democratic	Josephine D. Hunsinger (incumbent)	18,345	61.53
Republican	Michael L. Stacey	11,469	38.46
Total votes		29,814	100.0
Democratic hold			

17th District (Wayne County)
Party	Candidate	Votes	%
Republican	Weldon O. Yeager	14,782	51.14
Democratic	Jack E. Legel	14,118	48.85
Total votes		28,900	100.0
Republican hold			

18th District (Wayne County)
Party	Candidate	Votes	%
Democratic	Leonard S. Walton (incumbent)	17,760	75.07
Republican	Eugene A. Wickman	5,896	24.92
Total votes		23,656	100.0
Democratic hold			

19th District (Wayne County)
Party	Candidate	Votes	%
Democratic	Casmer P. Ogonowski	14,672	55.58
Republican	Anthony C. Licata (incumbent)	11,722	44.41
Total votes		26,394	100.0
Democratic gain from Republican			

20th District (Wayne County)
Party	Candidate	Votes	%
Democratic	George F. Montgomery Sr. (incumbent)	20,272	84.95
Republican	Norman Roy Williams	3,590	15.04
Total votes		23,862	100.0
Democratic hold			

21st District (Wayne County)
Party	Candidate	Votes	%
Democratic	George F. Montgomery Jr. (incumbent)	19,966	84.99
Republican	Edgar S. Hughes	3,526	15.00
Total votes		23,492	100.0
Democratic hold			

22nd District (Wayne County)
Party	Candidate	Votes	%
Democratic	Daisy Elliott (incumbent)	23,293	97.30
Republican	Markus S. Simon	644	2.69
Total votes		23,937	100.0
Democratic hold			

23rd District (Wayne County)
Party	Candidate	Votes	%
Democratic	Jackie Vaughn III (incumbent)	21,180	96.65
Republican	Thomas C. Wimberly Jr.	732	3.34
Total votes		21,912	100.0
Democratic hold			

24th District (Wayne County)
Party	Candidate	Votes	%
Democratic	James Del Rio (incumbent)	11,124	89.51
Republican	Delbert M. Heidler	1,303	10.48
Total votes		12,427	100.0
Democratic hold			

25th District (Wayne County)
Party	Candidate	Votes	%
Democratic	Frank V. Wierzbicki (incumbent)	14,704	82.38
Republican	Richard J. Brennan	3,144	17.61
Total votes		17,848	100.0
Democratic hold			

26th District (Wayne County)
Party	Candidate	Votes	%
Democratic	Matthew McNeely (incumbent)	17,210	100.0
Total votes		17,210	100.0
Democratic hold			

27th District (Wayne County)
Party	Candidate	Votes	%
Democratic	William R. Copeland (incumbent)	17,488	73.23
Republican	Douglas J. Wieneke	6,391	26.76
Total votes		23,879	100.0
Democratic hold			

28th District (Wayne County)
Party	Candidate	Votes	%
Democratic	Thomas J. Anderson (incumbent)	18,797	69.32
Republican	Michael D. Knox	8,316	30.67
Total votes		27,113	100.0
Democratic hold			

29th District (Wayne County)
Party	Candidate	Votes	%
Democratic	Alfred A. Sheridan (incumbent)	17,879	68.05
Republican	George W. Ward	8,394	31.94
Total votes		26,273	100.0
Democratic hold			

30th District (Wayne County)
Party	Candidate	Votes	%
Democratic	Joyce Symons (incumbent)	19,104	70.89
Republican	Joseph F. Nagy	7,842	29.10
Total votes		26,946	100.0
Democratic hold			

31st District (Wayne County)
Party	Candidate	Votes	%
Democratic	Lucille H. McCollough (incumbent)	21,742	72.57
Republican	Robert Nelson Pomeroy	8,214	27.42
Total votes		29,956	100.0
Democratic hold			

32nd District (Wayne County)
Party	Candidate	Votes	%
Democratic	Alex Pilch (incumbent)	17,392	70.21
Republican	Robert B. Vokac	7,378	29.78
Total votes		24,770	100.0
Democratic hold			

33rd District (Wayne County)
Party	Candidate	Votes	%
Democratic	Richard A. Young (incumbent)	20,561	61.88
Republican	James T. Brady	12,666	38.11
Total votes		33,227	100.0
Democratic hold			

34th District (Wayne County)
Party	Candidate	Votes	%
Democratic	John Bennett (incumbent)	17,139	62.84
Republican	Ronald C. Rice	10,135	37.15
Total votes		27,274	100.0
Democratic hold			

35th District (Wayne County)
Party	Candidate	Votes	%
Democratic	Marvin R. Stempien	19,987	53.59
Republican	Louis E. Schmidt (incumbent)	17,308	46.40
Total votes		37,295	100.0
Democratic gain from Republican			

36th District (Wayne County)
Party	Candidate	Votes	%
Democratic	James Tierney (incumbent)	19,513	65.13
Republican	Harold E. Bergquest	10,443	34.86
Total votes		29,956	100.0
Democratic hold			

37th District (Wayne County)
Party	Candidate	Votes	%
Democratic	Vincent J. Petitpren (incumbent)	15,850	69.48
Republican	Edward Bivens Jr.	6,960	30.51
Total votes		22,810	100.0
Democratic hold			

38th District (Monroe County, Wayne County)
Party	Candidate	Votes	%
Democratic	Edward E. Mahalak (incumbent)	13,624	58.20
Republican	Dale Wagenknecht	9,784	41.79
Total votes		23,408	100.0
Democratic hold			

39th District (Monroe County)
Party	Candidate	Votes	%
Democratic	Raymond C. Kehres (incumbent)	17,241	66.32
Republican	Joanne Nichols	8,755	33.67
Total votes		25,996	100.0
Democratic hold			

40th District (Lenawee County)
Party	Candidate	Votes	%
Republican	Robert C. Stites (incumbent)	14,527	57.87
Democratic	Ernest H. Oliver	10,572	42.12
Total votes		25,099	100.0
Republican hold			

41st District (Branch County, Hillsdale County, Lenawee County)
Party	Candidate	Votes	%
Republican	Frederic J. Marshall (incumbent)	15,959	63.53
Democratic	Paul Porter	9,160	36.46
Total votes		25,119	100.0
Republican hold			

42nd District (Berrien County, Cass County, St. Joseph County)
Party	Candidate	Votes	%
Republican	DeForrest Strang (incumbent)	15,499	56.97
Democratic	Don L. Marlin	11,706	43.02
Total votes		27,205	100.0
Republican hold			

43rd District (Berrien County, Cass County)
Party	Candidate	Votes	%
Republican	Don R. Pears (incumbent)	21,877	70.68
Democratic	Barry L. Moon	9,074	29.31
Total votes		30,951	100.0
Republican hold			

44th District (Berrien County, Cass County)
Party	Candidate	Votes	%
Republican	Ray C. Mittan (incumbent)	12,850	54.98
Democratic	Ervin R. Appelget	10,519	45.01
Total votes		23,369	100.0
Republican hold			

45th District (Calhoun County, Kalamazoo County, St. Joseph County)
Party	Candidate	Votes	%
Republican	James H. Heinze (incumbent)	18,509	63.85
Democratic	Louis S. Danley	10,475	36.14
Total votes		28,984	100.0
Republican hold			

46th District (Kalamazoo County)
Party	Candidate	Votes	%
Republican	William V. Weber (incumbent)	15,962	65.26
Democratic	Joseph W. Whitten	8,495	34.73
Total votes		24,457	100.0
Republican hold			

47th District (Kalamazoo County)
Party	Candidate	Votes	%
Republican	Wayne B. Sackett	18,315	55.89
Democratic	W. James Orr	14,451	44.10
Total votes		32,766	100.0
Republican hold			

48th District (Calhoun County)
Party	Candidate	Votes	%
Republican	Gustave J. Groat Sr. (incumbent)	13,647	53.65
Democratic	Joseph Noverr	11,788	46.34
Total votes		25,435	100.0
Republican hold			

49th District (Calhoun County, Jackson County, Lenawee County)
Party	Candidate	Votes	%
Republican	James Folks (incumbent)	18,960	63.50
Democratic	David R. McManus	10,897	36.49
Total votes		29,857	100.0
Republican hold			

50th District (Jackson County)
Party	Candidate	Votes	%
Republican	Hal Ziegler (incumbent)	13,089	59.58
Democratic	Richard Phillips	8,879	40.41
Total votes		21,968	100.0
Republican hold			

51st District (Lenawee County, Livingston County, Washtenaw County)
Party	Candidate	Votes	%
Republican	Thomas G. Sharpe (incumbent)	21,402	66.61
Democratic	Joseph W. Kolbe	10,724	33.38
Total votes		32,126	100.0
Republican hold			

52nd District (Washtenaw County)
Party	Candidate	Votes	%
Republican	Roy Smith (incumbent)	13,339	56.71
Democratic	James M. Cregar	10,179	43.28
Total votes		23,518	100.0
Republican hold			

53rd District (Washtenaw County)
Party	Candidate	Votes	%
Republican	Raymond J. Smit (incumbent)	19,185	56.74
Democratic	George Wahr Sallade	14,623	43.25
Total votes		33,808	100.0
Republican hold			

54th District (Allegan County, Van Buren County)
Party	Candidate	Votes	%
Republican	Edson V. Root Jr. (incumbent)	17,471	63.27
Democratic	Ed Nowacki	10,142	36.72
Total votes		27,613	100.0
Republican hold			

55th District (Allegan County, Barry County, Ottawa County)
Party	Candidate	Votes	%
Republican	James S. Farnsworth (incumbent)	21,286	71.15
Democratic	Glenn E. Mapes Jr.	8,627	28.84
Total votes		29,913	100.0
Republican hold			

56th District (Calhoun County, Eaton County)
Party	Candidate	Votes	%
Republican	Dale Warner (incumbent)	17,444	58.03
Democratic	Claude E. Burton	12,613	41.96
Total votes		30,057	100.0
Republican hold			

57th District (Ingham County)
Party	Candidate	Votes	%
Republican	Thomas L. Brown (incumbent)	13,868	53.25
Democratic	Sanford Brown	12,171	46.74
Total votes		26,039	100.0
Republican hold			

58th District (Ingham County)
Party	Candidate	Votes	%
Republican	Philip O. Pittenger (incumbent)	17,619	55.92
Democratic	Robert E. Dingwell	13,884	44.07
Total votes		31,503	100.0
Republican hold			

59th District (Ingham County, Jackson County)
Party	Candidate	Votes	%
Republican	Jim N. Brown	18,098	60.54
Democratic	Terry Black	11,795	39.45
Total votes		29,893	100.0
Republican hold			

60th District (Genesee County, Oakland County)
Party	Candidate	Votes	%
Republican	Clifford H. Smart (incumbent)	19,700	62.90
Democratic	William E. Todd	11,618	37.09
Total votes		31,318	100.0
Republican hold			

61st District (Oakland County)
Party	Candidate	Votes	%
Republican	Loren D. Anderson (incumbent)	18,690	60.70
Democratic	Donald L. Collier	12,097	39.29
Total votes		30,787	100.0
Republican hold			

62nd District (Oakland County)
Party	Candidate	Votes	%
Democratic	Arthur J. Law (incumbent)	12,534	61.57
Republican	Howard L. Dell	7,821	38.42
Total votes		20,355	100.0
Democratic hold			

63rd District (Oakland County)
Party	Candidate	Votes	%
Republican	Donald E. Bishop (incumbent)	18,382	59.87
Democratic	Ronald S. Knowles	12,321	40.12
Total votes		30,703	100.0
Republican hold			

64th District (Oakland County)
Party	Candidate	Votes	%
Republican	Raymond L. Baker (incumbent)	26,269	61.93
Democratic	Leonard P. Baruch	16,148	38.06
Total votes		42,417	100.0
Republican hold			

65th District (Oakland County)
Party	Candidate	Votes	%
Republican	William P. Hampton (incumbent)	37,052	79.13
Democratic	Harry J. McGowan Jr.	9,769	20.86
Total votes		46,821	100.0
Republican hold			

66th District (Oakland County)
Party	Candidate	Votes	%
Democratic	Bill Huffman (incumbent)	15,639	55.07
Republican	Richard H. Sanderson	12,756	44.92
Total votes		28,395	100.0
Democratic hold			

67th District (Oakland County)
Party	Candidate	Votes	%
Democratic	Albert A. Kramer (incumbent)	25,819	70.75
Republican	William E. Kish	10,671	29.24
Total votes		36,490	100.0
Democratic hold			

68th District (Oakland County)
Party	Candidate	Votes	%
Republican	William Hayward (incumbent)	17,558	58.53
Democratic	Wallace J. Reynolds	12,440	41.46
Total votes		29,998	100.0
Republican hold			

69th District (Oakland County)
Party	Candidate	Votes	%
Democratic	Daniel S. Cooper (incumbent)	18,054	64.25
Republican	LaRue T. Mead	10,044	35.74
Total votes		28,098	100.0
Democratic hold			

70th District (Macomb County)
Party	Candidate	Votes	%
Democratic	John T. Kelsey (incumbent)	24,694	73.94
Republican	Norma P. Barnes	8,700	26.05
Total votes		33,394	100.0
Democratic hold			

71st District (Macomb County)
Party	Candidate	Votes	%
Democratic	Thomas Guastello	23,153	54.69
Republican	Allen F. Rush (incumbent)	19,181	45.30
Total votes		42,334	100.0
Democratic gain from Republican			

72nd District (Macomb County)
Party	Candidate	Votes	%
Democratic	Warren N. Goemaere (incumbent)	26,342	67.43
Republican	Harold Donaldson	9,589	24.54
American Independent	Eugene J. May	3,133	8.02
Total votes		39,064	100.0
Democratic hold			

73rd District (Macomb County)
Party	Candidate	Votes	%
Democratic	Harold B. Clark (incumbent)	18,571	74.05
Republican	Ellsworth J. Carroll	6,507	25.94
Total votes		25,078	100.0
Democratic hold			

74th District (Macomb County)
Party	Candidate	Votes	%
Democratic	Joseph M. Snyder (incumbent)	18,681	68.07
Republican	George J. Korodan	8,759	31.92
Total votes		27,440	100.0
Democratic hold			

75th District (Macomb County, St. Clair County)
Party	Candidate	Votes	%
Republican	David M. Serotkin (incumbent)	13,324	53.62
Democratic	James C. Mitchell	11,524	46.37
Total votes		24,848	100.0
Republican hold			

76th District (St. Clair County)
Party	Candidate	Votes	%
Republican	William L. Jowett (incumbent)	17,471	69.12
Democratic	Robert L. Donoghue	7,805	30.87
Total votes		25,276	100.0
Republican hold			

77th District (Huron County, Sanilac County, St. Clair County)
Party	Candidate	Votes	%
Republican	Quincy P. Hoffman (incumbent)	20,122	73.60
Democratic	Eleanor M. Light	7,214	26.39
Total votes		27,336	100.0
Republican hold			

78th District (Huron County, Lapeer County, Tuscola County)
Party	Candidate	Votes	%
Republican	Roy L. Spencer (incumbent)	19,642	100.0
Total votes		19,642	100.0
Republican hold			

79th District (Genesee County)
Party	Candidate	Votes	%
Republican	James F. Smith (incumbent)	18,931	57.30
Democratic	Robert E. Weiss	14,105	42.69
Total votes		33,036	100.0
Republican hold			

80th District (Genesee County)
Party	Candidate	Votes	%
Democratic	Edward Suski (incumbent)	16,104	66.16
Republican	Raymond Simmonds	8,234	33.83
Total votes		24,338	100.0
Democratic hold			

81st District (Genesee County)
Party	Candidate	Votes	%
Democratic	Dale Kildee (incumbent)	14,367	55.32
Republican	Charles L. Cooper	11,603	44.67
Total votes		25,970	100.0
Democratic hold			

82nd District (Genesee County)
Party	Candidate	Votes	%
Democratic	Albert R. Horrigan (incumbent)	13,158	53.48
Republican	F. Robert Edwards	11,442	46.51
Total votes		24,600	100.0
Democratic hold			

83rd District (Genesee County)
Party	Candidate	Votes	%
Democratic	James N. Callahan (incumbent)	17,489	51.50
Republican	Harold L. Post	16,470	48.49
Total votes		33,959	100.0
Democratic hold			

84th District (Saginaw County, Tuscola County)
Party	Candidate	Votes	%
Republican	Harry E. Rohlfs (incumbent)	17,302	66.09
Democratic	Leon VanSteenhouse	8,877	33.90
Total votes		26,179	100.0
Republican hold			

85th District (Saginaw County)
Party	Candidate	Votes	%
Democratic	James E. O'Neill Jr. (incumbent)	12,975	65.66
Republican	Robert E. Jamison	6,785	34.33
Total votes		19,760	100.0
Democratic hold			

86th District (Saginaw County)
Party	Candidate	Votes	%
Republican	Bert C. Brennan	22,013	63.78
Democratic	Harry Ezop	12,496	36.21
Total votes		34,509	100.0
Republican hold			

87th District (Clinton County, Shiawassee County)
Party	Candidate	Votes	%
Republican	Bill Ballenger	19,660	64.03
Democratic	Richard D. Duzenbury	11,042	35.96
Total votes		30,702	100.0
Republican hold			

88th District (Clinton County, Eaton County, Gratiot County, Midland County)
Party	Candidate	Votes	%
Republican	Richard J. Allen	15,217	61.47
Democratic	Joseph F. Davey	9,537	38.52
Total votes		24,754	100.0
Republican hold			

89th District (Barry County, Ionia County, Kent County)
Party	Candidate	Votes	%
Republican	Stanley M. Powell (incumbent)	17,815	64.85
Democratic	Leo W. Barth	9,653	35.14
Total votes		27,468	100.0
Republican hold			

90th District (Kent County)
Party	Candidate	Votes	%
Republican	Martin D. Buth (incumbent)	22,821	66.71
Democratic	John R. Adams	11,384	33.28
Total votes		34,205	100.0
Republican hold			

91st District (Kent County)
Party	Candidate	Votes	%
Republican	Thomas G. Ford (incumbent)	28,975	72.65
Democratic	Joel E. Krissoff	10,904	27.34
Total votes		39,879	100.0
Republican hold			

92nd District (Kent County)
Party	Candidate	Votes	%
Democratic	Stanley J. Davis (incumbent)	14,072	59.61
Republican	Clarence William Fuller Jr.	9,531	40.38
Total votes		23,603	100.0
Democratic hold			

93rd District (Kent County)
Party	Candidate	Votes	%
Republican	Peter Kok (incumbent)	15,401	61.17
Democratic	John W. Brown	9,775	38.82
Total votes		25,176	100.0
Republican hold			

94th District (Kent County)
Party	Candidate	Votes	%
Democratic	Jelt Sietsema	12,262	51.44
Republican	Johannes C. Kolderman Jr. (incumbent)	11,573	48.55
Total votes		23,835	100.0
Democratic gain from Democratic			

95th District (Ottawa County)
Party	Candidate	Votes	%
Republican	Melvin DeStigter (incumbent)	24,839	71.16
Democratic	Chester J. Harmsen	10,066	28.83
Total votes		34,905	100.0
Republican hold			

96th District (Muskegon County)
Party	Candidate	Votes	%
Democratic	Gerrit C. Hasper	12,908	58.21
Republican	Robert L. VanDam	9,266	41.78
Total votes		22,174	100.0
Democratic hold			

97th District (Muskegon County)
Party	Candidate	Votes	%
Republican	Edgar A. Geerlings (incumbent)	16,597	56.37
Democratic	Bernard J. Brondyk	12,843	43.62
Total votes		29,440	100.0
Republican hold			

98th District (Lake County, Manistee County, Mason County, Muskegon County, Oceana County)
Party	Candidate	Votes	%
Republican	Dennis O. Cawthorne (incumbent)	18,766	62.45
Democratic	Eugene R. Cater	11,282	37.54
Total votes		30,048	100.0
Republican hold			

99th District (Clare County, Mecosta County, Newaygo County, Osceola County)
Party	Candidate	Votes	%
Republican	Donald E. Holbrook Jr. (incumbent)	20,013	69.96
Democratic	Patrick Dean McConnell	8,591	30.03
Total votes		28,604	100.0
Republican hold			

100th District (Isabella County, Montcalm County)
Party	Candidate	Votes	%
Republican	Russell H. Strange (incumbent)	15,641	61.05
Democratic	John H. Wilberding	9,978	38.94
Total votes		25,619	100.0
Republican hold			

101st District (Bay County)
Party	Candidate	Votes	%
Democratic	J. Bob Traxler (incumbent)	15,920	62.84
Republican	James H. McEvoy	9,411	37.15
Total votes		25,331	100.0
Democratic hold			

102nd District (Arenac County, Bay County, Iosco County, Ogemaw County)
Party	Candidate	Votes	%
Republican	George Prescott (incumbent)	17,417	59.38
Democratic	Connor D. Smith	11,910	40.61
Total votes		29,327	100.0
Republican hold			

103rd District (Crawford County, Gladwin County, Midland County, Missaukee County, Roscommon County)
Party	Candidate	Votes	%
Republican	Nelson G. Tisdale (incumbent)	22,579	68.51
Democratic	William G. Robbins	10,378	31.48
Total votes		32,957	100.0
Republican hold			

104th District (Benzie County, Grand Traverse County, Kalkaska County, Leelanau County, Missaukee County, Wexford County)
Party	Candidate	Votes	%
Republican	Michael Dively	21,024	100.0
Total votes		21,024	100.0
Republican hold			

105th District (Alcona County, Alpena County, Cheboygan County, Montmorency County, Oscoda County, Presque Isle County)
Party	Candidate	Votes	%
Republican	Joseph Patrick Swallow (incumbent)	16,555	56.80
Democratic	Edward Bastow Jr.	12,591	43.19
Total votes		29,146	100.0
Republican hold			

106th District (Antrim County, Charlevoix County, Chippewa County, Emmet County, Kalkaska County, Mackinac County, Otsego County)
Party	Candidate	Votes	%
Republican	Bob Davis (incumbent)	20,694	68.28
Democratic	George A. Lablance	9,612	31.71
Total votes		30,306	100.0
Republican hold			

107th District (Chippewa County, Delta County, Luce County, Schoolcraft County)
Party	Candidate	Votes	%
Republican	Charles H. Varnum (incumbent)	14,611	58.36
Democratic	Einar E. Erlandsen	10,422	41.63
Total votes		25,033	100.0
Republican hold			

108th District (Alger County, Baraga County, Delta County, Marquette County, Schoolcraft County)
Party	Candidate	Votes	%
Democratic	Dominic Jacobetti (incumbent)	15,931	61.83
Republican	A. J. Menhennick	9,832	38.16
Total votes		25,763	100.0
Democratic hold			

109th District (Dickinson County, Gogebic County, Iron County, Marquette County, Menominee County)
Party	Candidate	Votes	%
Republican	John D. Payant	15,233	50.52
Democratic	Jack Gingrass (incumbent)	14,915	49.47
Total votes		30,148	100.0
Republican gain from Democratic			

110th District (Gogebic County, Houghton County, Keweenaw County, Ontonagon County)
Party	Candidate	Votes	%
Democratic	Russell Hellman (incumbent)	15,182	52.48
Republican	Alfred Wright	13,745	47.51
Total votes		28,927	100.0
Democratic hold			
