= 1964 Michigan House of Representatives election =

- November 3, 1964

All 110 seats in the Michigan House of Representatives 56 seats needed for a majority
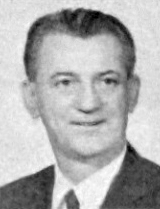

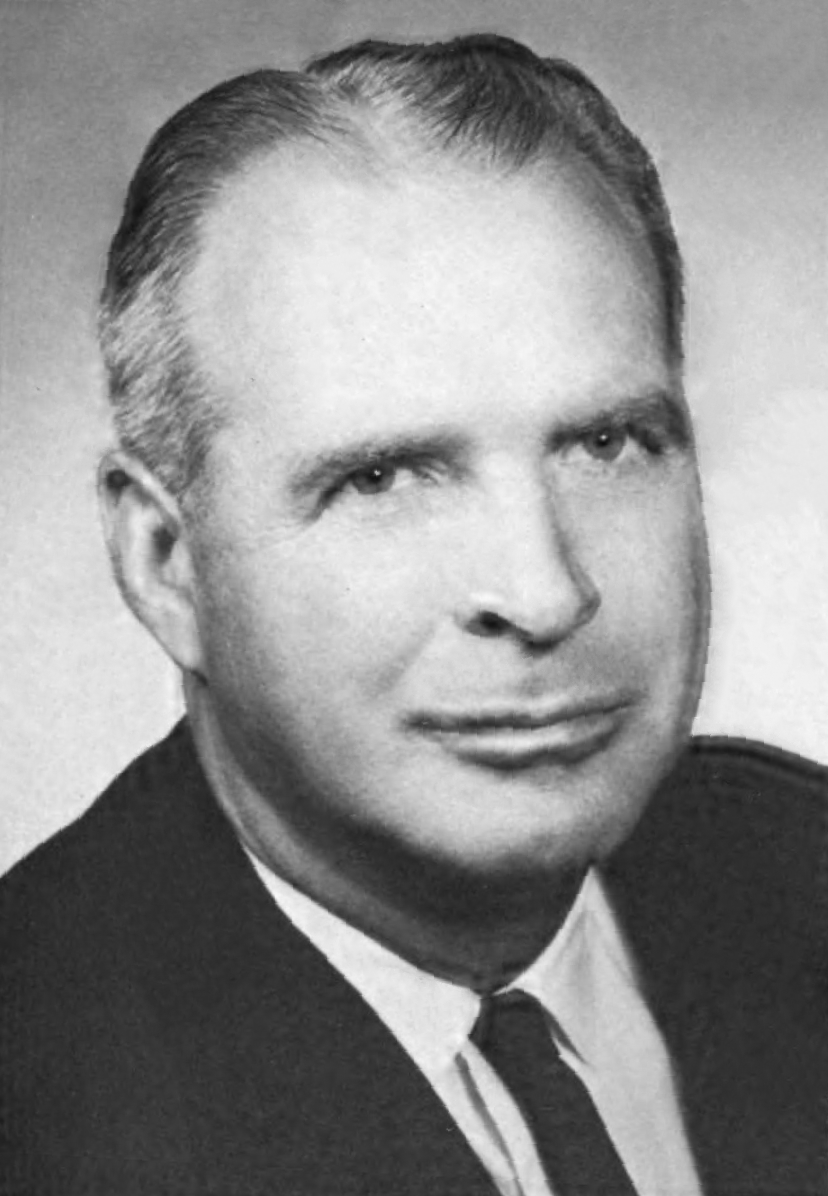
	Majority party	Minority party
Leader	Joseph J. Kowalski	Allison Green (retired)
Party	Democratic	Republican
Leader since	1959	1963
Leader's seat	Wayne 10th district	Tuscola district
Last election	52	58
Seats after	73	37
Seat change	▲21	▼21
Popular vote	1,747,268	1,242,038
Percentage	58.40%	41.52%
Speaker before election
Allison Green
Republican
Elected Speaker
Joseph J. Kowalski
Democratic

An election was held on November 3, 1964, to elect all 110 members of the Michigan House of Representatives for the 73rd Michigan Legislature. In the election, the Democratic won a 73–37 majority from what had been a Republican majority.

This was the first state House election following the adoption of the 1963 Michigan Constitution. It introduced a new apportionment plan, involving only single-member, numbered districts with population-based apportionment.

== History ==
In the 1962 general election, the Republicans won a 58–52 majority over the Democrats, increasing their previous majority by two seats.

The 1964 election was the first general election following the enactment of the 1963 Michigan Constitution on January 1, 1964. The new state constitution called for a new apportionment system for the state House, with only single-member districts, apportioned based on population. The previous state constitution had established both single and multi-member districts based on county boundaries. The Apportionment and Districting Plan of 1964 changed the naming scheme of districts, using only numbers, instead of naming them after counties. The new apportionment plan was inline with the "one man, one vote" principle established in the 1964 U.S. Supreme Court case Reynolds v. Sims.

The 1964 state primary was held on September 1. There were 25 incumbents unseated, 16 Democrats and 9 Republicans.

The general election was held on November 3. Initial results showed Democrats having won a 72–38 majority from the Republicans, with 10 Republican incumbents being ousted, and no incumbent Democrats being defeated. A recount in January 1965 showed Democrat Claude E. Burton had defeated Republican incumbent Carroll C. Newton, raising their majority to 73–37 from the general election. Following the election, Joseph J. Kowalski was elected speaker of the state House. Republicans selected Robert E. Waldron as minority leader.

The state House was sworn in on January 13, 1965. Democrat Walter J. Hyso died in December 1964, before being sworn in. The swearing in of Democrat Daniel W. West was delayed and ultimately denied, after an investigation surrounding alleged felony charges concluded that West had stolen his identity. Democrat James H. Karoub won the April 1965 special election to replace Hyso and Democrat James Del Rio won the May 1965 special election to replace West.

== Results ==
The following are the official results from the 1965–1966 Michigan Manual. The official results purposefully excluded scattered write-in votes.

=== Statewide ===
Party	Candi- dates	Votes		Seats		
Party	Candi- dates	No.	%	No.	+/–	%
Democratic Party	110	1,747,268	58.40%	73	▲21	66.36%
Republican Party	106	1,242,038	41.52%	37	▼21	33.63%
Freedom Now Party	9	2,084	0.06%	0	Steady	0.00%
Total	225	2,991,390	100.00%	110	Steady	100.00%

=== By district ===
1st District (Wayne County)
Party	Candidate	Votes	%
Republican	Robert E. Waldron (incumbent)	23,592	65.83
Democratic	William B. Fitzgerald	12,243	34.16
Total votes		35,835	100.0

2nd District (Wayne County)
Party	Candidate	Votes	%
Democratic	Walter J. Hyso (Note: Walter Hyso died in December 1964, before taking office.) (incumbent)	21,647	80.04
Republican	Ann R. Mead	5,396	19.95
Total votes		27,043	100.0

3rd District (Wayne County)
Party	Candidate	Votes	%
Democratic	William A. Ryan (incumbent)	17,194	74.16
Republican	Curtis R. Jacobson	5,991	25.83
Total votes		23,185	100.0

4th District (Wayne County)
Party	Candidate	Votes	%
Democratic	William B. Fitzgerald	17,790	60.74
Republican	William Knapp	11,494	39.25
Total votes		29,284	100.0

5th District (Wayne County)
Party	Candidate	Votes	%
Democratic	E. D. O'Brien (incumbent)	20,252	66.22
Republican	Robert J. Frost	10,328	33.77
Total votes		30,580	100.0

6th District (Wayne County)
Party	Candidate	Votes	%
Democratic	Robert Mahoney (incumbent)	22,883	76.86
Republican	Duncan G. Campbell	6,888	23.13
Total votes		29,771	100.0

7th District (Wayne County)
Party	Candidate	Votes	%
Democratic	Stephen Stopczynski	22,315	86.49
Republican	Vincent E. Kaye	3,485	13.50
Total votes		25,800	100.0

8th District (Wayne County)
Party	Candidate	Votes	%
Democratic	James Bradley (incumbent)	21,537	92.89
Republican	Samuel F. Winfield	1,647	7.10
Total votes		23,184	100.0

9th District (Wayne County)
Party	Candidate	Votes	%
Democratic	Rosetta A. Ferguson	16,152	78.41
Republican	Douglas Dow	4,445	21.58
Total votes		20,597	100.0

10th District (Wayne County)
Party	Candidate	Votes	%
Democratic	David S. Holmes Jr. (incumbent)	16,750	93.94
Republican	Leila Wiggins	995	5.58
Freedom Now	Christopher C. Alston	84	0.47
Total votes		17,829	100.0

11th District (Wayne County)
Party	Candidate	Votes	%
Democratic	Thomas W. White	13,424	81.74
Republican	Robert J. Henderson	2,866	17.45
Freedom Now	William W. Smith	131	0.79
Total votes		16,421	100.0

12th District (Wayne County)
Party	Candidate	Votes	%
Democratic	George H. Edwards (incumbent)	22,575	90.64
Republican	Gerard O. White	2,058	8.26
Freedom Now	Henry E. Slayton	273	1.09
Total votes		24,906	100.0

13th District (Wayne County)
Party	Candidate	Votes	%
Democratic	Edward K. Michalski (incumbent)	24,593	87.83
Republican	Michael L. Jarvis	3,211	11.46
Freedom Now	David A. Cleage	195	0.69
Total votes		27,999	100.0

14th District (Wayne County)
Party	Candidate	Votes	%
Democratic	Raymond W. Hood	21,081	73.90
Republican	George W. Tobias	7,207	25.26
Freedom Now	Ronald Latham	235	0.82
Total votes		28,523	100.0

15th District (Wayne County)
Party	Candidate	Votes	%
Democratic	Jack Faxon	25,851	76.46
Republican	Dorothy C. Caswell	7,834	23.17
Freedom Now	Felix E. Whittaker	121	0.35
Total votes		33,806	100.0

16th District (Wayne County)
Party	Candidate	Votes	%
Democratic	Josephine D. Hunsinger (incumbent)	18,546	60.37
Republican	Earl E. Stevens	12,170	39.62
Total votes		30,716	100.0

17th District (Wayne County)
Party	Candidate	Votes	%
Republican	J. Harold Stevens	16,550	50.68
Democratic	Walter E. Schemanske	16,101	49.31
Total votes		32,651	100.0

18th District (Wayne County)
Party	Candidate	Votes	%
Democratic	Leonard S. Walton (incumbent)	19,686	73.61
Republican	Clifford A. Andrus	7,055	26.38
Total votes		26,741	100.0

19th District (Wayne County)
Party	Candidate	Votes	%
Democratic	Joseph J. Kowalski (incumbent)	18,752	65.78
Republican	John Gerard Trudell	9,755	34.21
Total votes		28,507	100.0

20th District (Wayne County)
Party	Candidate	Votes	%
Democratic	George F. Montgomery Sr. (incumbent)	20,088	70.81
Republican	Edward Soronen	8,153	28.74
Freedom Now	Lonnie Murray	124	0.43
Total votes		28,365	100.0

21st District (Wayne County)
Party	Candidate	Votes	%
Democratic	George F. Montgomery Jr.	22,461	81.73
Republican	Samuel Lewis	5,020	18.26
Total votes		27,481	100.0

22nd District (Wayne County)
Party	Candidate	Votes	%
Democratic	Daisy Elliott (incumbent)	24,976	93.22
Republican	William M. Bell	1,311	4.89
Freedom Now	James S. Daniels	504	1.88
Total votes		26,791	100.0

23rd District (Wayne County)
Party	Candidate	Votes	%
Democratic	Maxcine Young (incumbent)	23,936	98.28
Freedom Now	Hugh C. Cleage	417	1.71
Total votes		24,353	100.0

24th District (Wayne County)
Party	Candidate	Votes	%
Democratic	Daniel W. West (Note: Daniel West was denied his state House seat after he was found to be using a stolen identity.) (incumbent)	14,914	88.90
Republican	Charlotte Jean Brinkman	1,861	11.09
Total votes		16,775	100.0

25th District (Wayne County)
Party	Candidate	Votes	%
Democratic	John J. Fitzpatrick (incumbent)	18,227	83.57
Republican	John G. Krauss	3,581	16.42
Total votes		21,808	100.0

26th District (Wayne County)
Party	Candidate	Votes	%
Democratic	Matthew McNeely	20,339	100.0
Total votes		20,339	100.0

27th District (Wayne County)
Party	Candidate	Votes	%
Democratic	William R. Copeland (incumbent)	19,988	77.12
Republican	Richmond G. Meyer	5,930	22.87
Total votes		25,918	100.0

28th District (Wayne County)
Party	Candidate	Votes	%
Democratic	Thomas J. Anderson	18,505	70.75
Republican	Malcolm J. MacKenzie	7,648	29.24
Total votes		26,153	100.0

29th District (Wayne County)
Party	Candidate	Votes	%
Democratic	Alfred A. Sheridan	16,015	67.52
Republican	Kenneth C. Evans	7,703	32.47
Total votes		23,718	100.0

30th District (Wayne County)
Party	Candidate	Votes	%
Democratic	Joyce Symons	18,018	65.42
Republican	Joseph F. Nagy	9,523	34.57
Total votes		27,541	100.0

31st District (Wayne County)
Party	Candidate	Votes	%
Democratic	Lucille H. McCollough (incumbent)	22,670	71.45
Republican	James Vigilante	9,055	28.54
Total votes		31,725	100.0

32nd District (Wayne County)
Party	Candidate	Votes	%
Democratic	William Harry Thorne (incumbent)	16,690	66.04
Republican	George Andrew Hodak	8,582	33.95
Total votes		25,272	100.0

33rd District (Wayne County)
Party	Candidate	Votes	%
Democratic	Richard A. Young	17,103	55.73
Republican	Thomas D. McLennan	13,582	44.26
Total votes		30,685	100.0

34th District (Wayne County)
Party	Candidate	Votes	%
Democratic	John Bennett	16,848	60.35
Republican	Eugene W. Duston	11,069	39.64
Total votes		27,917	100.0

35th District (Wayne County)
Party	Candidate	Votes	%
Democratic	Marvin R. Stempien	18,356	55.82
Republican	Lonnie H. Brashear	14,523	44.17
Total votes		32,879	100.0

36th District (Wayne County)
Party	Candidate	Votes	%
Democratic	James Tierney	15,367	61.42
Republican	Wallace Green	9,651	38.57
Total votes		25,018	100.0

37th District (Wayne County)
Party	Candidate	Votes	%
Democratic	Vincent J. Petitpren	15,522	71.08
Republican	Philip Ralph Biebesheimer	6,313	28.91
Total votes		21,835	100.0

38th District (Monroe County, Wayne County)
Party	Candidate	Votes	%
Democratic	Edward E. Mahalak	16,091	100.0
Total votes		16,091	100.0

39th District (Monroe County)
Party	Candidate	Votes	%
Democratic	Raymond C. Kehres	14,167	53.81
Republican	Milton J. H. Knabusch (incumbent)	12,157	46.18
Total votes		26,324	100.0

40th District (Lenawee County)
Party	Candidate	Votes	%
Republican	Rollo G. Conlin (incumbent)	14,098	56.82
Democratic	Hugh Flippo	10,713	43.17
Total votes		24,811	100.0

41st District (Branch County, Hillsdale County, Lenawee County)
Party	Candidate	Votes	%
Republican	Frederic J. Marshall (incumbent)	14,254	54.93
Democratic	Charles H. Miller	11,691	45.06
Total votes		25,945	100.0

42nd District (Berrien County, Cass County, St. Joseph County)
Party	Candidate	Votes	%
Republican	Floyd E. Wagner (incumbent)	14,098	50.72
Democratic	Charles J. LaSata	13,694	49.27
Total votes		27,792	100.0

43rd District (Berrien County, Cass County)
Party	Candidate	Votes	%
Republican	Don R. Pears	17,660	57.78
Democratic	William J. Burkett	12,899	42.21
Total votes		30,559	100.0

44th District (Berrien County, Cass County)
Party	Candidate	Votes	%
Democratic	Floyd J. Mattheeussen	12,914	53.53
Republican	Gail Handy (incumbent)	11,209	46.46
Total votes		24,123	100.0

45th District (Calhoun County, Kalamazoo County, St. Joseph County)
Party	Candidate	Votes	%
Republican	Harry A. DeMaso (incumbent)	14,504	53.34
Democratic	Max Raymond	12,684	46.65
Total votes		27,188	100.0

46th District (Kalamazoo County)
Party	Candidate	Votes	%
Republican	Homer Arnett (incumbent)	13,399	53.71
Democratic	Larry S. Eldridge	11,545	46.28
Total votes		24,944	100.0

47th District (Kalamazoo County)
Party	Candidate	Votes	%
Republican	Cyril H. Root (incumbent)	15,646	52.61
Democratic	Ray Derksen Jr.	14,090	47.38
Total votes		29,736	100.0

48th District (Calhoun County)
Party	Candidate	Votes	%
Democratic	W. Scott Ensign	13,441	52.98
Republican	Walter H. North	11,927	47.01
Total votes		25,368	100.0

49th District (Calhoun County, Jackson County, Lenawee County)
Party	Candidate	Votes	%
Republican	James Folks (incumbent)	14,863	53.94
Democratic	Robert W. Cook	12,688	46.05
Total votes		27,551	100.0

50th District (Jackson County)
Party	Candidate	Votes	%
Democratic	Charles O. Conrad	12,300	52.40
Republican	Wilfred G. Bassett (incumbent)	11,172	47.59
Total votes		23,472	100.0

51st District (Lenawee County, Livingston County, Washtenaw County)
Party	Candidate	Votes	%
Republican	Thomas G. Sharpe (incumbent)	16,767	59.24
Democratic	Brian Lavan	11,534	40.75
Total votes		28,301	100.0

52nd District (Washtenaw County)
Party	Candidate	Votes	%
Democratic	Charles F. Gray	12,985	54.81
Republican	James F. Warner (incumbent)	10,703	45.18
Total votes		23,688	100.0

53rd District (Washtenaw County)
Party	Candidate	Votes	%
Republican	Marvin L. Esch	15,920	54.05
Democratic	Albert J. Coudron	13,531	45.94
Total votes		29,451	100.0

54th District (Allegan County, Van Buren County)
Party	Candidate	Votes	%
Republican	Edson V. Root Jr. (incumbent)	15,624	57.04
Democratic	Jules M. Serbenski Sr.	11,763	42.95
Total votes		27,387	100.0

55th District (Allegan County, Barry County, Ottawa County)
Party	Candidate	Votes	%
Republican	James S. Farnsworth (incumbent)	19,140	65.48
Democratic	Ralph E. Richman	10,090	34.51
Total votes		29,230	100.0

56th District (Calhoun County, Eaton County)
Party	Candidate	Votes	%
Democratic	Claude E. Burton (Note: Initial results showed Carroll C. Newton had defeated Claude Burton. A recount held in January 1965 showed that Burton had actually defeated Newton.)	13,794	50.02
Republican	Carroll C. Newton (incumbent)	13,778	49.97
Total votes		27,572	100.0

57th District (Ingham County)
Party	Candidate	Votes	%
Democratic	H. James Starr	16,021	56.07
Republican	Marie L. Hager (incumbent)	12,552	43.92
Total votes		28,573	100.0

58th District (Ingham County)
Party	Candidate	Votes	%
Democratic	Robert E. Dingwell	16,155	52.05
Republican	Harold W. Hungerford (incumbent)	14,882	47.94
Total votes		31,037	100.0

59th District (Ingham County, Jackson County)
Party	Candidate	Votes	%
Republican	Charles J. Davis (incumbent)	16,783	64.47
Democratic	George C. Bubolz	9,246	35.52
Total votes		26,029	100.0

60th District (Genesee County, Oakland County)
Party	Candidate	Votes	%
Republican	Clifford H. Smart	14,510	51.86
Democratic	Dwight R. Lawler	13,468	48.13
Total votes		27,978	100.0

61st District (Oakland County)
Party	Candidate	Votes	%
Democratic	Francis A. Crowley	14,271	51.82
Republican	Lloyd L. Anderson (incumbent)	13,264	48.17
Total votes		27,535	100.0

62nd District (Oakland County)
Party	Candidate	Votes	%
Democratic	Arthur J. Law (incumbent)	16,560	70.48
Republican	Carolyn Murphy	6,935	29.51
Total votes		23,495	100.0

63rd District (Oakland County)
Party	Candidate	Votes	%
Democratic	Robert J. Slingerlend	13,913	52.48
Republican	James F. Carey	12,597	47.51
Total votes		26,510	100.0

64th District (Oakland County)
Party	Candidate	Votes	%
Republican	Raymond L. Baker (incumbent)	18,943	58.94
Democratic	John I. Bain	13,195	41.05
Total votes		32,138	100.0

65th District (Oakland County)
Party	Candidate	Votes	%
Republican	William P. Hampton	32,323	80.68
Democratic	Ernest W. Nigg Jr.	7,738	19.31
Total votes		40,061	100.0

66th District (Oakland County)
Party	Candidate	Votes	%
Democratic	Bill Huffman (incumbent)	15,981	66.28
Republican	Roy F. Strause	8,127	33.71
Total votes		24,108	100.0

67th District (Oakland County)
Party	Candidate	Votes	%
Democratic	Albert A. Kramer	19,864	64.94
Republican	Harvey Van Buhler	10,720	35.05
Total votes		30,584	100.0

68th District (Oakland County)
Party	Candidate	Votes	%
Republican	William Hayward (incumbent)	17,118	55.35
Democratic	John E. Kronenberg	13,807	44.64
Total votes		30,925	100.0

69th District (Oakland County)
Party	Candidate	Votes	%
Democratic	Daniel S. Cooper	18,228	63.55
Republican	Max D. Hill	10,452	36.44
Total votes		28,680	100.0

70th District (Macomb County)
Party	Candidate	Votes	%
Democratic	John T. Kelsey	23,961	76.34
Republican	Norma Barnes	7,424	23.65
Total votes		31,385	100.0

71st District (Macomb County)
Party	Candidate	Votes	%
Democratic	Bruce L. Monks	18,560	61.81
Republican	Robert H. Campbell	11,463	38.18
Total votes		30,023	100.0

72nd District (Macomb County)
Party	Candidate	Votes	%
Democratic	Warren N. Goemaere	24,287	75.11
Republican	Kenneth J. Matiyow	8,046	24.88
Total votes		32,333	100.0

73rd District (Macomb County)
Party	Candidate	Votes	%
Democratic	Harold B. Clark	20,892	100.0
Total votes		20,892	100.0

74th District (Macomb County)
Party	Candidate	Votes	%
Democratic	Joseph M. Snyder (incumbent)	19,030	68.39
Republican	Donald J. Addy	8,795	31.60
Total votes		27,825	100.0

75th District (Macomb County, St. Clair County)
Party	Candidate	Votes	%
Democratic	Victor R. Steeh	12,693	53.44
Republican	James S. Nunneley	11,056	46.55
Total votes		23,749	100.0

76th District (St. Clair County)
Party	Candidate	Votes	%
Republican	Raymond C. Wurzel	15,487	59.43
Democratic	Eldon H. Dell Jr.	10,568	40.56
Total votes		26,055	100.0

77th District (Huron County, Sanilac County, St. Clair County)
Party	Candidate	Votes	%
Republican	Quincy P. Hoffman	17,816	63.58
Democratic	Harold L. Richards	10,205	36.41
Total votes		28,021	100.0

78th District (Huron County, Lapeer County, Tuscola County)
Party	Candidate	Votes	%
Republican	Roy L. Spencer (incumbent)	15,792	62.31
Democratic	Wilma Dillon	9,549	37.68
Total votes		25,341	100.0

79th District (Genesee County)
Party	Candidate	Votes	%
Democratic	Bobby Crim	16,664	58.46
Republican	Russell H. Stephens	11,838	41.53
Total votes		28,502	100.0

80th District (Genesee County)
Party	Candidate	Votes	%
Democratic	Edward Suski	17,051	71.21
Republican	Lawrence P. Ford	6,893	28.78
Total votes		23,944	100.0

81st District (Genesee County)
Party	Candidate	Votes	%
Democratic	Dale Kildee	17,136	65.00
Republican	L. Keith Borgerson	9,227	34.99
Total votes		26,363	100.0

82nd District (Genesee County)
Party	Candidate	Votes	%
Democratic	Albert R. Horrigan (incumbent)	15,732	59.41
Republican	Charles A. Mobley	10,744	40.58
Total votes		26,476	100.0

83rd District (Genesee County)
Party	Candidate	Votes	%
Democratic	Ray M. Flavin	16,340	57.21
Republican	Stanley C. Perkins	12,220	42.78
Total votes		28,560	100.0

84th District (Saginaw County, Tuscola County)
Party	Candidate	Votes	%
Republican	Harry E. Rohlfs	13,078	51.23
Democratic	Robert Russell	12,449	48.76
Total votes		25,527	100.0

85th District (Saginaw County)
Party	Candidate	Votes	%
Democratic	William A. Boos Jr. (incumbent)	15,587	68.77
Republican	Robert D. Parson	7,078	31.22
Total votes		22,665	100.0

86th District (Saginaw County)
Party	Candidate	Votes	%
Republican	Carl O. Little (incumbent)	17,179	54.01
Democratic	Leo M. Kenny	14,623	45.98
Total votes		31,802	100.0

87th District (Clinton County, Shiawassee County)
Party	Candidate	Votes	%
Republican	Blair G. Woodman	16,015	54.72
Democratic	Sanford Volker	13,248	45.27
Total votes		29,263	100.0

88th District (Clinton County, Eaton County, Gratiot County, Midland County)
Party	Candidate	Votes	%
Republican	Lester J. Allen (incumbent)	12,871	55.75
Democratic	Leroy Vincent	10,213	44.24
Total votes		23,084	100.0

89th District (Barry County, Ionia County, Kent County)
Party	Candidate	Votes	%
Republican	Stanley M. Powell	15,162	55.20
Democratic	Holden Cook	12,301	44.79
Total votes		27,463	100.0

90th District (Kent County)
Party	Candidate	Votes	%
Republican	Martin D. Buth (incumbent)	17,463	56.09
Democratic	Ronald E. Swanson	13,667	43.90
Total votes		31,130	100.0

91st District (Kent County)
Party	Candidate	Votes	%
Republican	Thomas G. Ford	22,768	67.53
Democratic	Tony Brouwer	10,944	32.46
Total votes		33,712	100.0

92nd District (Kent County)
Party	Candidate	Votes	%
Democratic	Stanley J. Davis	17,013	65.75
Republican	James J. Mol	8,859	34.24
Total votes		25,872	100.0

93rd District (Kent County)
Party	Candidate	Votes	%
Republican	Peter Kok	17,857	62.77
Democratic	Rosemary Isner	10,589	37.22
Total votes		28,446	100.0

94th District (Kent County)
Party	Candidate	Votes	%
Democratic	George Sietsema	14,456	57.43
Republican	William Doorn (incumbent)	10,712	42.56
Total votes		25,168	100.0

95th District (Ottawa County)
Party	Candidate	Votes	%
Republican	Melvin DeStigter	19,221	60.00
Democratic	Malcolm L. Ferguson	12,811	39.99
Total votes		32,032	100.0

96th District (Muskegon County)
Party	Candidate	Votes	%
Democratic	Francis W. Beedon (incumbent)	15,661	61.40
Republican	Oscar E. Johnson	9,844	38.59
Total votes		25,505	100.0

97th District (Muskegon County)
Party	Candidate	Votes	%
Democratic	F. Charles Raap	14,458	51.48
Republican	Edgar A. Geerlings	13,626	48.51
Total votes		28,084	100.0

98th District (Lake County, Manistee County, Mason County, Muskegon County, Oceana County)
Party	Candidate	Votes	%
Democratic	Eugene R. Cater	16,653	56.73
Republican	Hans C. Rasmussen (incumbent)	12,697	43.26
Total votes		29,350	100.0

99th District (Clare County, Mecosta County, Newaygo County, Osceola County)
Party	Candidate	Votes	%
Republican	Donald E. Holbrook Jr.	17,362	63.36
Democratic	Elden B. Crawford	10,038	36.63
Total votes		27,400	100.0

100th District (Isabella County, Montcalm County)
Party	Candidate	Votes	%
Republican	Russell H. Strange (incumbent)	13,551	55.18
Democratic	Elizabeth J. Hradel	11,003	44.81
Total votes		24,554	100.0

101st District (Bay County)
Party	Candidate	Votes	%
Democratic	J. Bob Traxler (incumbent)	17,834	67.55
Republican	John Eaton	8,566	32.44
Total votes		26,400	100.0

102nd District (Arenac County, Bay County, Iosco County, Ogemaw County)
Party	Candidate	Votes	%
Democratic	Sanford E. Charron	14,695	52.84
Republican	James P. Mielock (incumbent)	13,113	47.15
Total votes		27,808	100.0

103rd District (Crawford County, Gladwin County, Midland County, Missaukee County, Roscommon County)
Party	Candidate	Votes	%
Republican	Nelson G. Tisdale (incumbent)	18,385	60.23
Democratic	Earl T. Miller	12,136	39.76
Total votes		30,521	100.0

104th District (Benzie County, Grand Traverse County, Kalkaska County, Leelanau County, Missaukee County, Wexford County)
Party	Candidate	Votes	%
Republican	Arnell Engstrom (incumbent)	17,913	62.23
Democratic	John B. Hopkins	10,872	37.76
Total votes		28,785	100.0

105th District (Alcona County, Alpena County, Cheboygan County, Montmorency County, Oscoda County, Presque Isle County)
Party	Candidate	Votes	%
Republican	Joseph Patrick Swallow	16,199	57.15
Democratic	Edward J. Bouchey	12,143	42.84
Total votes		28,342	100.0

106th District (Antrim County, Charlevoix County, Chippewa County, Emmet County, Kalkaska County, Mackinac County, Otsego County)
Party	Candidate	Votes	%
Republican	Clayton T. Morrison (incumbent)	16,748	56.34
Democratic	Earl Walker	12,978	43.65
Total votes		29,726	100.0

107th District (Chippewa County, Delta County, Luce County, Schoolcraft County)
Party	Candidate	Votes	%
Democratic	Einar E. Erlandsen (incumbent)	15,035	59.09
Republican	Marian Gibson	10,406	40.90
Total votes		25,441	100.0

108th District (Alger County, Baraga County, Delta County, Marquette County, Schoolcraft County)
Party	Candidate	Votes	%
Democratic	Dominic Jacobetti (incumbent)	17,079	63.69
Republican	C. Fred Rydholm	9,734	36.30
Total votes		26,813	100.0

109th District (Dickinson County, Gogebic County, Iron County, Marquette County, Menominee County)
Party	Candidate	Votes	%
Democratic	James K. Constantini	16,848	53.66
Republican	Clifford E. Perras (incumbent)	14,547	46.33
Total votes		31,395	100.0

110th District (Gogebic County, Houghton County, Keweenaw County, Ontonagon County)
Party	Candidate	Votes	%
Democratic	Russell Hellman (incumbent)	18,810	61.68
Republican	Bert M. Heideman	11,686	38.31
Total votes		30,496	100.0

== See also ==
- 1964 Michigan Senate election
