= 1970 Michigan House of Representatives election =

- November 3, 1970

All 110 seats in the Michigan House of Representatives 56 seats needed for a majority
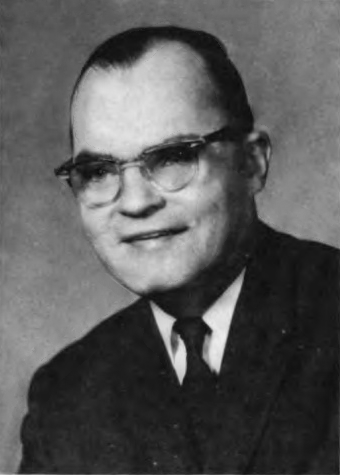

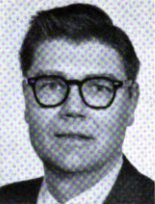
	Majority party	Minority party
Leader	William A. Ryan	Robert E. Waldron (retired)
Party	Democratic	Republican
Leader since	1967	1965
Leader's seat	3rd district	1st district
Last election	57	53
Seats after	58	52
Seat change	▲1	▼1
Popular vote	1,371,930	1,107,430
Percentage	55.29%	44.63%
Speaker before election
William A. Ryan
Democratic
Elected Speaker
William A. Ryan
Democratic

An election was held on November 3, 1970, to elect all 110 members of the Michigan House of Representatives for the 76th Michigan Legislature. In the election, the Democrats won a 58–52 majority over the Republicans, maintaining control of the chamber.

== History ==
In the 1968 general election, the Democrats won a 57–53 majority over the Republicans, from what had been a 56–54 Republican majority over the Democrats.

The 1970 state primary was held on August 4. Around 20 incumbent state representatives chose not to run for re-election. One of them was Republican Minority Leader Robert E. Waldron, who retired. The primaries saw two incumbent Republicans unseated. Russell Strange was defeated by John Engler. Robert Stites was defeated by John S. Mowat Jr.

The general election was held on November 3. The Democrats won a net total of one seat, resulting in an larger 58–53 majority over the Republicans. Three seats flipped in total. Two Republican seats flipped to Democrat, and one Democrat seat flipped to Republican. Democrat William M. Brodhead won the seat vacated by Republican Weldon O. Yeager. Democrat Earl E. Nelson won the seat being vacated by Republican Thomas L. Brown. Republican F. Robert Edwards won the seat vacated by Albert Horrigan.

After the election, William A. Ryan was re-elected speaker of the state House. The Republicans elected Clifford H. Smart as minority leader.

The state House was sworn in on January 13, 1971.

== Results ==
The following are the official results from the 1971–1972 Michigan Manual. The official results purposefully excluded scattered write-in votes.

=== Statewide ===
Party	Candi- dates	Votes (Note: County election results in the 93rd district in Kent County and the 108th district in Baraga County were changed and corrected, but were not updated in the official state results.) (Note: There was a mathematical error in the official results printed in the Michigan Manual in the 23rd district. The error in the district's results have been preserved in this article and in the calculation of the statewide total.)		Seats		
Party	Candi- dates	No.	%	No.	+/–	%
Democratic Party	108	1,371,930	55.29%	58	▲1	52.72%
Republican Party	108	1,107,430	44.63%	52	▼1	47.27%
American Independent Party	8	1,841	0.07%	0	Steady	0.00%
Total	224	2,481,181	100.00%	110	Steady	100.00%

=== By district ===
1st District (Wayne County)
Party	Candidate	Votes	%
Republican	William R. Bryant Jr.	20,760	73.08
Democratic	Manuel L. Papista	7,646	26.91
Total votes		28,406	100.0
Republican hold			

2nd District (Wayne County)
Party	Candidate	Votes	%
Democratic	Ted Mrozowski (incumbent)	13,746	84.33
Republican	Ronald L. Bielecki	2,554	15.66
Total votes		16,300	100.0
Democratic hold			

3rd District (Wayne County)
Party	Candidate	Votes	%
Democratic	William A. Ryan (incumbent)	10,639	79.06
Republican	Philip Terry Knight	2,817	20.93
Total votes		13,456	100.0
Democratic hold			

4th District (Wayne County)
Party	Candidate	Votes	%
Democratic	William B. Fitzgerald (incumbent)	13,380	65.15
Republican	Chris Panos	7,155	34.84
Total votes		20,535	100.0
Democratic hold			

5th District (Wayne County)
Party	Candidate	Votes	%
Democratic	E. D. O'Brien (incumbent)	17,119	74.58
Republican	Gordon R. Michaelson	5,832	25.41
Total votes		22,951	100.0
Democratic hold			

6th District (Wayne County)
Party	Candidate	Votes	%
Democratic	Robert Mahoney (incumbent)	18,772	80.27
Republican	Jack M. Atrill	4,612	19.72
Total votes		23,384	100.0
Democratic hold			

7th District (Wayne County)
Party	Candidate	Votes	%
Democratic	Stephen Stopczynski (incumbent)	15,056	89.81
Republican	Theodore P. Wasinski	1,708	10.18
Total votes		16,764	100.0
Democratic hold			

8th District (Wayne County)
Party	Candidate	Votes	%
Democratic	James Bradley (incumbent)	13,973	96.10
Republican	John J. Mathie	567	3.89
Total votes		14,540	100.0
Democratic hold			

9th District (Wayne County)
Party	Candidate	Votes	%
Democratic	Rosetta A. Ferguson (incumbent)	10,685	81.04
Republican	Lorin C. Anderson	2,499	18.95
Total votes		13,184	100.0
Democratic hold			

10th District (Wayne County)
Party	Candidate	Votes	%
Democratic	David S. Holmes Jr. (incumbent)	9,196	93.02
Republican	Constance Tiggs	690	6.97
Total votes		9,886	100.0
Democratic hold			

11th District (Wayne County)
Party	Candidate	Votes	%
Democratic	Nelis J. Saunders (incumbent)	6,386	79.90
Republican	William L. Magill	1,606	20.09
Total votes		7,992	100.0
Democratic hold			

12th District (Wayne County)
Party	Candidate	Votes	%
Democratic	George H. Edwards (incumbent)	13,142	92.83
Republican	Fred Jackson	1,015	7.16
Total votes		14,157	100.0
Democratic hold			

13th District (Wayne County)
Party	Candidate	Votes	%
Democratic	Michael Novak (incumbent)	17,779	90.77
Republican	Abaham M. Stevens	1,806	9.22
Total votes		19,585	100.0
Democratic hold			

14th District (Wayne County)
Party	Candidate	Votes	%
Democratic	Raymond W. Hood (incumbent)	16,419	81.25
Republican	Ivan S. Mendenhall	3,787	18.74
Total votes		20,206	100.0
Democratic hold			

15th District (Wayne County)
Party	Candidate	Votes	%
Democratic	Alma G. Stallworth	20,617	86.66
Republican	W. Jerry Garrett	3,172	13.33
Total votes		23,789	100.0
Democratic hold			

16th District (Wayne County)
Party	Candidate	Votes	%
Democratic	Josephine D. Hunsinger (incumbent)	16,961	67.19
Republican	Lillian S. Pfeiffer	8,282	32.80
Total votes		25,243	100.0
Democratic hold			

17th District (Wayne County)
Party	Candidate	Votes	%
Democratic	William M. Brodhead	13,755	56.08
Republican	H. Ronald McClune	10,772	43.91
Total votes		24,527	100.0
Democratic gain from Republican			

18th District (Wayne County)
Party	Candidate	Votes	%
Democratic	Leonard S. Walton (incumbent)	15,122	74.30
Republican	Walter Dombrowski	5,229	25.69
Total votes		20,351	100.0
Democratic hold			

19th District (Wayne County)
Party	Candidate	Votes	%
Democratic	Casmer P. Ogonowski (incumbent)	14,556	69.89
Republican	Anthony Delorenzo	6,271	30.10
Total votes		20,827	100.0
Democratic hold			

20th District (Wayne County)
Party	Candidate	Votes	%
Democratic	George F. Montgomery Sr. (incumbent)	15,997	89.39
Republican	Paul W. Staub	1,898	10.60
Total votes		17,895	100.0
Democratic hold			

21st District (Wayne County)
Party	Candidate	Votes	%
Democratic	Morris Hood Jr.	14,505	81.69
Republican	Edgar S. Hughes	3,249	18.30
Total votes		17,754	100.0
Democratic hold			

22nd District (Wayne County)
Party	Candidate	Votes	%
Democratic	Daisy Elliott (incumbent)	16,368	96.31
Republican	R. Alanzo Boston IV	626	3.68
Total votes		16,994	100.0
Democratic hold			

23rd District (Wayne County)
Party	Candidate	Votes	%
Democratic	Jackie Vaughn III (incumbent)	14,911	96.53
Republican	Richard H. Cleage	555	3.59
Total votes		15,446	100.0
Democratic hold			

24th District (Wayne County)
Party	Candidate	Votes	%
Democratic	James Del Rio (incumbent)	6,970	83.08
Republican	Delbert M. Heidler	1,419	16.91
Total votes		8,389	100.0
Democratic hold			

25th District (Wayne County)
Party	Candidate	Votes	%
Democratic	Frank V. Wierzbicki (incumbent)	12,162	84.41
Republican	Gerald R. Pearsall	2,246	15.58
Total votes		14,408	100.0
Democratic hold			

26th District (Wayne County)
Party	Candidate	Votes	%
Democratic	Matthew McNeely (incumbent)	13,157	90.20
Republican	Stanley Richard Tucker	1,429	9.79
Total votes		14,586	100.0
Democratic hold			

27th District (Wayne County)
Party	Candidate	Votes	%
Democratic	William R. Copeland (incumbent)	14,680	77.44
Republican	Douglas J. Wieneke	4,275	22.55
Total votes		18,955	100.0
Democratic hold			

28th District (Wayne County)
Party	Candidate	Votes	%
Democratic	Thomas J. Anderson (incumbent)	16,385	73.07
Republican	James E. Dudus	6,036	26.92
Total votes		22,421	100.0
Democratic hold			

29th District (Wayne County)
Party	Candidate	Votes	%
Democratic	Alfred A. Sheridan (incumbent)	15,146	71.65
Republican	George W. Ward	5,990	28.34
Total votes		21,136	100.0
Democratic hold			

30th District (Wayne County)
Party	Candidate	Votes	%
Democratic	Joyce Symons (incumbent)	16,080	70.49
Republican	Jonathan C. Campbell	6,731	29.50
Total votes		22,811	100.0
Democratic hold			

31st District (Wayne County)
Party	Candidate	Votes	%
Democratic	Lucille H. McCollough (incumbent)	18,170	75.25
Republican	James Richard Lynn	5,976	24.74
Total votes		24,146	100.0
Democratic hold			

32nd District (Wayne County)
Party	Candidate	Votes	%
Democratic	Alex Pilch (incumbent)	15,201	73.52
Republican	Dwight H. Vincent	5,475	26.47
Total votes		20,676	100.0
Democratic hold			

33rd District (Wayne County)
Party	Candidate	Votes	%
Democratic	Richard A. Young (incumbent)	20,229	71.54
Republican	Alan James Armitage	8,047	28.45
Total votes		28,276	100.0
Democratic hold			

34th District (Wayne County)
Party	Candidate	Votes	%
Democratic	John Bennett (incumbent)	17,817	73.76
Republican	Thomas M. Barnhart	6,337	26.23
Total votes		24,154	100.0
Democratic hold			

35th District (Wayne County)
Party	Candidate	Votes	%
Democratic	Marvin R. Stempien (incumbent)	17,911	54.06
Republican	Robert F. Swanson	15,217	45.93
Total votes		33,128	100.0
Democratic hold			

36th District (Wayne County)
Party	Candidate	Votes	%
Democratic	James Tierney (incumbent)	18,535	
Republican	Jacquelyn Ann Boelter	6,423	
Total votes		24,958	100.0
Democratic hold			

37th District (Wayne County)
Party	Candidate	Votes	%
Democratic	Thomas H. Brown	12,520	
Republican	Leland D. Johnston	4,750	
Total votes		17,270	100.0
Democratic hold			

38th District (Monroe County, Wayne County)
Party	Candidate	Votes	%
Democratic	Edward E. Mahalak (incumbent)	13,060	
Republican	Dale C. Wagenknecht	7,486	
Total votes		20,546	100.0
Democratic hold			

39th District (Monroe County)
Party	Candidate	Votes	%
Democratic	Raymond C. Kehres (incumbent)	14,401	
Republican	Joseph T. Green	6,701	
Total votes		21,102	100.0
Democratic hold			

40th District (Lenawee County)
Party	Candidate	Votes	%
Republican	John S. Mowat Jr.	11,595	
Democratic	Ernest H. Oliver	8,121	
Total votes		19,716	100.0
Republican hold			

41st District (Branch County, Hillsdale County, Lenawee County)
Party	Candidate	Votes	%
Republican	John P. Smeekens (incumbent)	13,267	
Democratic	Paul Porter	7,306	
Total votes		20,573	100.0
Republican hold			

42nd District (Berrien County, Cass County, St. Joseph County)
Party	Candidate	Votes	%
Republican	DeForrest Strang (incumbent)	11,676	56.53
Democratic	Burke H. Webb	8,975	43.46
Total votes		20,651	100.0
Republican hold			

43rd District (Berrien County, Cass County)
Party	Candidate	Votes	%
Republican	Harry Gast	15,925	65.82
Democratic	James Booth	8,267	34.17
Total votes		24,192	100.0
Republican hold			

44th District (Berrien County, Cass County)
Party	Candidate	Votes	%
Republican	Ray C. Mittan (incumbent)	9,790	56.53
Democratic	Margaret A. Crishal	7,526	43.46
Total votes		17,316	100.0
Republican hold			

45th District (Calhoun County, Kalamazoo County, St. Joseph County)
Party	Candidate	Votes	%
Republican	James H. Heinze (incumbent)	14,585	97.09
American Independent	Paul A. Tubbs	436	2.90
Total votes		15,021	100.0
Republican hold			

46th District (Kalamazoo County)
Party	Candidate	Votes	%
Republican	William V. Weber (incumbent)	10,531	51.80
Democratic	James T. Brignall	9,797	48.19
Total votes		20,328	100.0
Republican hold			

47th District (Kalamazoo County)
Party	Candidate	Votes	%
Republican	Wayne B. Sackett (incumbent)	14,270	50.86
Democratic	W. James Orr	13,786	49.13
Total votes		28,056	100.0
Republican hold			

48th District (Calhoun County)
Party	Candidate	Votes	%
Republican	Gustave J. Groat Sr. (incumbent)	10,505	53.23
Democratic	Marcus J. Gray	9,006	45.64
American Independent	Clair L. Bishop	221	1.12
Total votes		19,732	100.0
Republican hold			

49th District (Calhoun County, Jackson County, Lenawee County)
Party	Candidate	Votes	%
Republican	James Folks (incumbent)	14,652	59.13
Democratic	Harold Wright	10,124	40.86
Total votes		24,776	100.0
Republican hold			

50th District (Jackson County)
Party	Candidate	Votes	%
Republican	Hal Ziegler (incumbent)	10,254	56.95
Democratic	Richard Phillips	7,750	43.04
Total votes		18,004	100.0
Republican hold			

51st District (Lenawee County, Livingston County, Washtenaw County)
Party	Candidate	Votes	%
Republican	Thomas G. Sharpe (incumbent)	19,217	100.0
Total votes		19,217	100.0
Republican hold			

52nd District (Washtenaw County)
Party	Candidate	Votes	%
Republican	Roy Smith (incumbent)	11,352	58.02
Democratic	Suzanne Freund	8,211	41.97
Total votes		19,563	100.0
Republican hold			

53rd District (Washtenaw County)
Party	Candidate	Votes	%
Republican	Raymond J. Smit (incumbent)	18,387	59.73
Democratic	Donald Edgar Koster	12,395	40.26
Total votes		30,782	100.0
Republican hold			

54th District (Allegan County, Van Buren County)
Party	Candidate	Votes	%
Republican	Edson V. Root Jr. (incumbent)	13,054	58.26
Democratic	Micheal A. Dittlinger Sr.	9,350	41.73
Total votes		22,404	100.0
Republican hold			

55th District (Allegan County, Barry County, Ottawa County)
Party	Candidate	Votes	%
Republican	James S. Farnsworth (incumbent)	17,877	68.19
Democratic	Jack Martin	8,338	31.80
Total votes		26,215	100.0
Republican hold			

56th District (Calhoun County, Eaton County)
Party	Candidate	Votes	%
Republican	Dale Warner (incumbent)	14,619	56.21
Democratic	Claude E. Burton	11,387	43.78
Total votes		26,006	100.0
Republican hold			

57th District (Ingham County)
Party	Candidate	Votes	%
Democratic	Earl E. Nelson	11,511	53.84
Republican	David F. Machtel Jr.	9,725	45.48
American Independent	Max W. Calder	144	0.67
Total votes		21,380	100.0
Democratic gain from Republican			

58th District (Ingham County)
Party	Candidate	Votes	%
Republican	Frederick L. Stackable	15,268	54.10
Democratic	Thomas C. Walsh	12,949	45.89
Total votes		28,217	100.0
Republican hold			

59th District (Ingham County, Jackson County)
Party	Candidate	Votes	%
Republican	Jim N. Brown (incumbent)	15,933	59.25
Democratic	George L. Griffiths	10,954	40.74
Total votes		26,887	100.0
Republican hold			

60th District (Genesee County, Oakland County)
Party	Candidate	Votes	%
Republican	Clifford H. Smart (incumbent)	15,987	57.55
Democratic	E. Joseph St. Aubin	11,788	42.44
Total votes		27,775	100.0
Republican hold			

61st District (Oakland County)
Party	Candidate	Votes	%
Republican	Loren D. Anderson (incumbent)	15,502	56.85
Democratic	Ronald Herron	11,766	43.14
Total votes		27,268	100.0
Republican hold			

62nd District (Oakland County)
Party	Candidate	Votes	%
Democratic	Arthur J. Law (incumbent)	10,279	66.15
Republican	Howard L. Dell	5,259	33.84
Total votes		15,538	100.0
Democratic hold			

63rd District (Oakland County)
Party	Candidate	Votes	%
Republican	James Damman	14,081	52.98
Democratic	Harold A. Janes	12,493	47.01
Total votes		26,574	100.0
Republican hold			

64th District (Oakland County)
Party	Candidate	Votes	%
Republican	Raymond L. Baker (incumbent)	22,534	59.60
Democratic	Leonard P. Baruch	15,271	40.39
Total votes		37,805	100.0
Republican hold			

65th District (Oakland County)
Party	Candidate	Votes	%
Republican	James E. Defebaugh	29,498	77.47
Democratic	Ralph Miller	8,575	22.52
Total votes		38,073	100.0
Republican hold			

66th District (Oakland County)
Party	Candidate	Votes	%
Democratic	Bill Huffman (incumbent)	12,406	54.00
Republican	Richard H. Sanderson	10,568	45.99
Total votes		22,974	100.0
Democratic hold			

67th District (Oakland County)
Party	Candidate	Votes	%
Democratic	Joseph Forbes	22,293	73.72
Republican	Fred E. Wilson	7,947	26.27
Total votes		30,240	100.0
Democratic hold			

68th District (Oakland County)
Party	Candidate	Votes	%
Republican	William Hayward (incumbent)	14,622	61.05
Democratic	Wallace J. Reynolds	9,327	38.94
Total votes		23,949	100.0
Republican hold			

69th District (Oakland County)
Party	Candidate	Votes	%
Democratic	Philip Mastin	13,857	63.58
Republican	Donald Wm. Sargent	7,936	36.41
Total votes		21,793	100.0
Democratic hold			

70th District (Macomb County)
Party	Candidate	Votes	%
Democratic	John T. Kelsey (incumbent)	23,315	79.24
Republican	Jervis J. Wattles	6,107	20.75
Total votes		29,422	100.0
Democratic hold			

71st District (Macomb County)
Party	Candidate	Votes	%
Democratic	Thomas Guastello (incumbent)	25,988	62.53
Republican	Bruce C. Lyons	15,568	37.46
Total votes		41,556	100.0
Democratic hold			

72nd District (Macomb County)
Party	Candidate	Votes	%
Democratic	Warren N. Goemaere (incumbent)	25,628	76.85
Republican	Donald W. Loomis	7,719	23.14
Total votes		33,347	100.0
Democratic hold			

73rd District (Macomb County)
Party	Candidate	Votes	%
Democratic	Harold B. Clark (incumbent)	15,592	73.03
Republican	Victor Borowsky	5,606	26.25
American Independent	Carolyn Skelton	151	0.70
Total votes		21,349	100.0
Democratic hold			

74th District (Macomb County)
Party	Candidate	Votes	%
Democratic	Joseph M. Snyder (incumbent)	17,056	100.0
Total votes		17,056	100.0
Democratic hold			

75th District (Macomb County, St. Clair County)
Party	Candidate	Votes	%
Republican	David M. Serotkin (incumbent)	12,445	54.99
Democratic	Victor R. Steeh	10,028	44.31
American Independent	Billy F. Roland	156	0.68
Total votes		22,629	100.0
Republican hold			

76th District (St. Clair County)
Party	Candidate	Votes	%
Republican	William L. Jowett (incumbent)	13,178	59.55
Democratic	James F. Gerrits	8,948	40.44
Total votes		22,126	100.0
Republican hold			

77th District (Huron County, Sanilac County, St. Clair County)
Party	Candidate	Votes	%
Republican	Quincy Hoffman (incumbent)	15,414	65.21
Democratic	Harold L. Richards	8,221	34.78
Total votes		23,635	100.0
Republican hold			

78th District (Huron County, Lapeer County, Tuscola County)
Party	Candidate	Votes	%
Republican	Roy L. Spencer (incumbent)	13,595	63.49
Democratic	Ronald Thwing	7,817	36.50
Total votes		21,412	100.0
Republican hold			

79th District (Genesee County)
Party	Candidate	Votes	%
Republican	James F. Smith (incumbent)	16,135	55.50
Democratic	Richard O. Shannon	12,936	44.49
Total votes		29,071	100.0
Republican hold			

80th District (Genesee County)
Party	Candidate	Votes	%
Democratic	Edward Suski (incumbent)	14,406	76.79
Republican	Raymond Simmonds	4,354	23.20
Total votes		18,760	100.0
Democratic hold			

81st District (Genesee County)
Party	Candidate	Votes	%
Democratic	Dale Kildee (incumbent)	14,709	73.87
Republican	Douglas A. Covell	5,203	26.12
Total votes		19,912	100.0
Democratic hold			

82nd District (Genesee County)
Party	Candidate	Votes	%
Republican	F. Robert Edwards	9,877	52.14
Democratic	Floyd J. McCree	9,064	47.85
Total votes		18,941	100.0
Republican gain from Democratic			

83rd District (Genesee County)
Party	Candidate	Votes	%
Democratic	Theodore P. Mansour (Note: There was a recount held in the 83rd district in January 1971. The recount affirmed Theodore P. Mansour's victory.)	15,010	50.20
Republican	Raymond J. Kelly III	14,886	49.79
Total votes		29,896	100.0
Democratic hold			

84th District (Saginaw County, Tuscola County)
Party	Candidate	Votes	%
Republican	Robert D. Young	14,238	60.06
Democratic	Robert Russell	9,465	39.93
Total votes		23,703	100.0
Republican hold			

85th District (Saginaw County)
Party	Candidate	Votes	%
Democratic	James E. O'Neill Jr. (incumbent)	10,216	71.67
Republican	William H. Haithco	4,037	28.32
Total votes		14,253	100.0
Democratic hold			

86th District (Saginaw County)
Party	Candidate	Votes	%
Republican	Bert C. Brennan (incumbent)	18,824	64.04
Democratic	Dorothy Joan Currie	10,569	35.95
Total votes		29,393	100.0
Republican hold			

87th District (Clinton County, Shiawassee County)
Party	Candidate	Votes	%
Republican	R. Douglas Trezise	15,106	56.08
Democratic	Richard Duzenbury	11,529	42.80
American Independent	Dale F. Calder	300	1.11
Total votes		26,935	100.0
Republican hold			

88th District (Clinton County, Eaton County, Gratiot County, Midland County)
Party	Candidate	Votes	%
Republican	Richard J. Allen (incumbent)	13,305	63.68
Democratic	Mary C. Kurka	7,587	36.31
Total votes		20,892	100.0
Republican hold			

89th District (Barry County, Ionia County, Kent County)
Party	Candidate	Votes	%
Republican	Stanley M. Powell (incumbent)	13,004	55.48
Democratic	Robert D. Fahey	10,431	44.51
Total votes		23,435	100.0
Republican hold			

90th District (Kent County)
Party	Candidate	Votes	%
Republican	Martin Buth (incumbent)	19,157	63.56
Democratic	John R. Adams	10,983	36.43
Total votes		30,140	100.0
Republican hold			

91st District (Kent County)
Party	Candidate	Votes	%
Republican	Thomas G. Ford (incumbent)	25,812	72.40
Democratic	James D. Hazzard	9,838	27.59
Total votes		35,650	100.0
Republican hold			

92nd District (Kent County)
Party	Candidate	Votes	%
Democratic	Stanley J. Davis (incumbent)	13,043	66.27
Republican	Harold W. Clark	6,636	33.72
Total votes		19,679	100.0
Democratic hold			

93rd District (Kent County)
Party	Candidate	Votes	%
Republican	Peter Kok (incumbent)	11,815	61.33
Democratic	Bruce E. Gauthier	7,447	38.66
Total votes		19,262	100.0
Republican hold			

94th District (Kent County)
Party	Candidate	Votes	%
Democratic	Jelt Sietsema (incumbent)	11,619	60.10
Republican	Jacob Gerrit Haagsman	7,711	39.89
Total votes		19,330	100.0
Democratic hold			

95th District (Ottawa County)
Party	Candidate	Votes	%
Republican	Melvin DeStigter (incumbent)	21,061	66.98
Democratic	Earl R. Curry	10,147	32.27
American Independent	James W. Bruins	232	0.73
Total votes		31,440	100.0
Republican hold			

96th District (Muskegon County)
Party	Candidate	Votes	%
Democratic	Gerrit C. Hasper (incumbent)	10,426	57.50
Republican	Jack S. Hakes	7,704	42.49
Total votes		18,130	100.0
Democratic hold			

97th District (Muskegon County)
Party	Candidate	Votes	%
Republican	Edgar A. Geerlings (incumbent)	15,036	59.25
Democratic	Ruth Marcus	10,139	39.95
American Independent	Myron O'Brien	201	0.79
Total votes		25,376	100.0
Republican hold			

98th District (Lake County, Manistee County, Mason County, Muskegon County, Oceana County)
Party	Candidate	Votes	%
Republican	Dennis O. Cawthorne (incumbent)	15,909	61.64
Democratic	Arthur J. Lister	9,899	38.35
Total votes		25,808	100.0
Republican hold			

99th District (Clare County, Mecosta County, Newaygo County, Osceola County)
Party	Candidate	Votes	%
Republican	Donald E. Holbrook Jr. (incumbent)	15,823	64.31
Democratic	John H. Wolf	8,779	35.68
Total votes		24,602	100.0
Republican hold			

100th District (Isabella County, Montcalm County)
Party	Candidate	Votes	%
Republican	John Engler	12,728	59.23
Democratic	Joe De Bolt	8,759	40.76
Total votes		21,487	100.0
Republican hold			

101st District (Bay County)
Party	Candidate	Votes	%
Democratic	J. Bob Traxler (incumbent)	15,977	69.59
Republican	Charles E. Smith	6,979	30.40
Total votes		22,956	100.0
Democratic hold			

102nd District (Arenac County, Bay County, Iosco County, Ogemaw County)
Party	Candidate	Votes	%
Republican	George Prescott (incumbent)	14,204	54.51
Democratic	Patrick A. Race	11,852	45.48
Total votes		26,056	100.0
Republican hold			

103rd District (Crawford County, Gladwin County, Midland County, Missaukee County, Roscommon County)
Party	Candidate	Votes	%
Republican	Louis K. Cramton	18,203	63.16
Democratic	Thomas M. Byron	10,614	36.83
Total votes		28,817	100.0
Republican hold			

104th District (Benzie County, Grand Traverse County, Kalkaska County, Leelanau County, Missaukee County, Wexford County)
Party	Candidate	Votes	%
Republican	Michael Dively (incumbent)	17,139	65.10
Democratic	Larry Olson	9,186	34.89
Total votes		26,325	100.0
Republican hold			

105th District (Alcona County, Alpena County, Cheboygan County, Montmorency County, Oscoda County, Presque Isle County)
Party	Candidate	Votes	%
Republican	Joseph Patrick Swallow (incumbent)	15,267	62.48
Democratic	A. M. Schneider	9,166	37.51
Total votes		24,433	100.0
Republican hold			

106th District (Antrim County, Charlevoix County, Chippewa County, Emmet County, Kalkaska County, Mackinac County, Otsego County)
Party	Candidate	Votes	%
Republican	Richard Friske (Note: There was a recount held in the 106th district in January 1971. The recount affirmed Richard Friske's victory.)	12,407	51.31
Democratic	Peter C. Johnson	11,770	48.68
Total votes		24,177	100.0
Republican hold			

107th District (Chippewa County, Delta County, Luce County, Schoolcraft County)
Party	Candidate	Votes	%
Republican	Charles H. Varnum (incumbent)	12,726	58.23
Democratic	Michael J. Nelson	9,126	41.76
Total votes		21,852	100.0
Republican hold			

108th District (Alger County, Baraga County, Delta County, Marquette County, Schoolcraft County)
Party	Candidate	Votes	%
Democratic	Dominic Jacobetti (incumbent)	14,998	100.0
Total votes		14,998	100.0
Democratic hold			

109th District (Dickinson County, Gogebic County, Iron County, Marquette County, Menominee County)
Party	Candidate	Votes	%
Republican	John D. Payant (incumbent)	13,974	54.38
Democratic	Jack Gingrass	11,722	45.61
Total votes		25,696	100.0
Republican hold			

110th District (Gogebic County, Houghton County, Keweenaw County, Ontonagon County)
Party	Candidate	Votes	%
Democratic	Russell Hellman (incumbent)	14,963	59.64
Republican	D. J. Massoglia	10,122	40.35
Total votes		25,085	100.0
Democratic hold			

== See also ==
- 1970 Michigan Senate election
