= Freedom Now Party =

American political party

The Freedom Now Party was a political party in the United States founded in August 1963 during the March on Washington for Jobs and Freedom. It had a Black membership. It was indirectly linked to the Socialist Workers Party. It existed from 1963 to 1965.

In 1963 elections, the party appeared on the ballot in Connecticut, Michigan, New York and Washington, D.C. Hoping to earn one million votes, the party fell far short of its initial goal. In 1964, the party's efforts were primarily directed toward Michigan. In that year, 39 members ran for office. Most prominent was Rev. Albert Cleage, who ran for Governor of Michigan. Cleage, a black pastor at the Central Congregation Church in Detroit, received 4,767 votes (0.15%) and the party soon collapsed.

== Membership ==
One of its most prominent members was Paul Boutelle. Boutelle ran for State Senate in Harlem in 1964 and, following the collapse of the FNP, was the Socialist Workers Party nominee for president in 1968.

Prominent black intellectuals and activists were involved in the party's founding, including:

- journalist William Worthy,
- Daniel Watts, chairman, Liberation Committee for Africa,
- Civil Rights attorney Conrad Lynn,
- Reverend Albert Cleage,
- Reverend Milton Henry
