= Ray M. Flavin =

American politician (1912–2008)

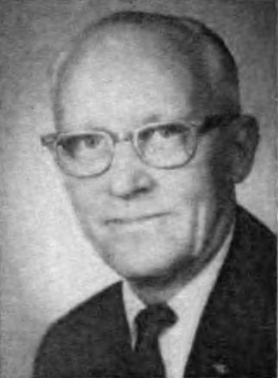

Member of the Michigan House of Representatives from the 83rd district
- In office January 13, 1965 – December 31, 1966
- Preceded by: District established
- Succeeded by: James N. Callahan

Personal details
- Born: August 25, 1912 Litchville, North Dakota
- Died: January 10, 2008 (aged 95) Swartz Creek, Michigan
- Party: Democratic

Ray M. Flavin (August 25, 1912 – January 10, 2008) was a Michigan politician.

== Early life ==
Flavin was born on August 25, 1912, in Litchville, North Dakota. In 1935, Flavin moved to the Flint, Michigan, area.

== Career ==
Flavin was an employee of the Buick Motor Division until he started his political career. In 1955, Flavin started serving in the position of Flint Township trustee. During this term, he also served as a police commissioner. In April 1959, Flavin was elected as Flint Township supervisor, and served a total of 15 years in this position between 1959 and 1980. While supervisor, he fought against the municipal annexation of Flint Township. Flavin also served in county level positions, on the Genesee County Board of Supervisors and on the Genesee County Planning Commission. In 1861, Flavin was an unsuccessful candidate in the primary for the position of delegate to Michigan constitutional convention from the Genesee County 2nd District. On November 4, 1964, Flavin was elected to the Michigan House of Representatives, where he represented the 83rd district from January 13, 1965, to December 31, 1966. Flavin was defeated in his bid for re-election in the 1966 Democratic primary. Flavin was defeated again, when running for the same position in 1968.

== Personal life ==
On January 18, 1937, Flavin married Dorothy Coolman. Together, they had five children. Flavin was a Freemason. Flavin was Protestant.

== Death ==
Flavin died on January 10, 2008, in Swartz Creek, Michigan. He was interred at Bendle Cemetery in Clayton Township, Michigan.
