= Sanford E. Charron =

American politician (1917–2008)

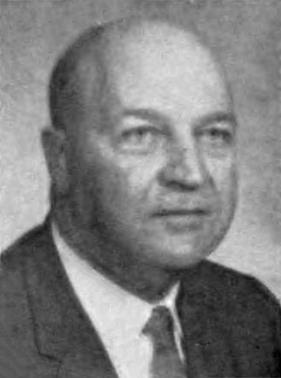

Member of the Michigan House of Representatives from the 102nd district
- In office January 1, 1965 – January 1, 1967
- Preceded by: District established
- Succeeded by: George Prescott

Personal details
- Born: May 13, 1917 Crawford County, Michigan, US
- Died: March 1, 2008 (aged 90)
- Party: Democratic; Republican (1968)

Sanford Everret Charron (May 13, 1917 – March 1, 2008) was a Michigan politician.

== Early life and education ==
Sanford E. Charron was born on May 13, 1917, in Crawford County, Michigan. Sanford graduated high school.

== Career ==
Charron served in the United States Army Corps of Engineers. Charron worked as a service station operator. Charron had served as a township clerk and a councilman. On November 4, 1964, Charron was elected to the Michigan House of Representatives seat representing the 102nd district. Charron assumed office on January 1, 1965, and was sworn into the office on January 13, 1965. In 1966, Charron sought re-election, but was defeated in the Democratic primary that year. Charron left office on January 1, 1967. In 1968, Charron ran for the same state house seat as a Republican, but was again defeated.

== Personal life ==
During his time in the legislature, Charron lived in Pinconning, Michigan. In 1937, Charron married Loretta Virginia Sorenson. Together, they had five children. Charron was a member of the Lions Club and the Disabled American Veterans. Charron was Lutheran.

== Death ==
Charron died on March 1, 2008.
