= Jim N. Brown =

American politician (1926–1991)

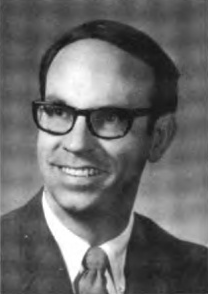

Member of the Michigan House of Representatives from the 59th district
- In office January 1, 1969 – December 31, 1972
- Preceded by: Charles J. Davis
- Succeeded by: H. Lynn Jondahl

Personal details
- Born: December 9, 1926 Mason, Michigan, US
- Died: April 14, 1991 (aged 64) Lansing, Michigan, US
- Party: Republican
- Spouse: Joan
- Children: 4
- Education: Central Michigan University; Michigan State University

Military service
- Allegiance: United States of America
- Branch/service: United States Marine Corps
- Battles/wars: World War II

James Nelson Brown (December 9, 1926 – April 14, 1991) was an American politician who served on the Michigan House of Representatives from 1969 to 1972.

== Early life ==
Brown was born on December 9, 1926, in Mason, Ingham County, Michigan to parents Vernon J. Brown and Maud R. DeCamp.

== Military service ==
Brown served in the United States Marine Corps during World War II.

== Personal life ==
Brown married Joan in 1951. Brown was a member of Kiwanis, the American Legion, and Veterans of Foreign Wars. Brown was a Presbyterian.

== Career ==
In 1968, Brown was delegate to the Republican National Convention. Brown was sworn into office as member of the Michigan House of Representatives from the 59th district and held this office until December 31, 1972. In 1972, Brown ran for United States Representative from Michigan's 6th district, but lost in the primaries.

== Death ==
Brown died on April 14, 1991. He is interred at Hawley Cemetery in Mason, Ingham County, Michigan.
