= Allen F. Rush =

American politician (1902–1980)

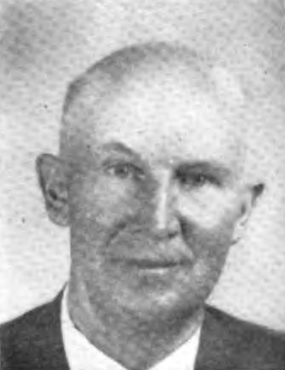

Member of the Michigan House of Representatives from the 71st district
- In office January 11, 1967 – December 31, 1968
- Preceded by: Bruce L. Monks
- Succeeded by: Thomas Guastello

Personal details
- Born: January 3, 1902 Romeo, Michigan
- Died: January 1980 (aged 77-78)
- Party: Republican
- Education: Romeo High School; Michigan State University

Allen F. Rush (January 3, 1902 – January 1980) was a Michigan politician.

== Early life and education ==
Allen was born on January 3, 1902, in Romeo, Michigan to parents Lee and Mary Rush. Allen graduated from Romeo High School and took two courses at Michigan State University.

== Career ==
Rush was a farmer, and a member of the Michigan State Horticultural Society. From 1961 to 1962, Rush served as the delegate to the Michigan constitutional convention from the Macomb County 3rd district. On November 8, 1966, Rush was elected to the Michigan House of Representatives, where he represented the 71st district from January 11, 1967, to December 31, 1968.

== Personal life ==
In 1930, Rushed married Jessie A. Turner. Together, they had one child. Rush was a member of the Rotary Club, but ended his membership before being elected to the state legislature. Rush was Methodist.

== Death ==
Rush died in January 1980.
