= H. James Starr =

American politician (1931–2009)

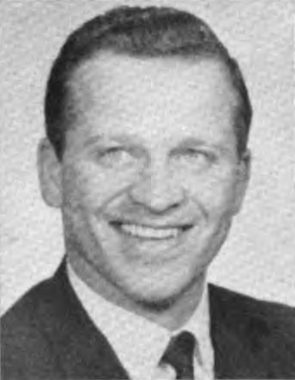

Member of the Michigan House of Representatives from the 57th district
- In office January 13, 1965 – December 31, 1966
- Preceded by: District established
- Succeeded by: Thomas L. Brown

Personal details
- Born: July 11, 1931 Bedford, Indiana, U.S.
- Died: July 20, 2009 (aged 78) Lansing, Michigan, U.S.
- Party: Democratic
- Education: Lansing Eastern High School; Michigan State University; Wayne State University Law School

Military service
- Allegiance: United States
- Branch/service: United States Army
- Years of service: 1954-1956

Herbert James Starr (July 11, 1931 – July 20, 2009) was a Michigan politician.

== Early life and education ==
Starr was born on July 11, 1931, in Bedford, Indiana. Starr graduated from Lansing Eastern High School in 1949, Michigan State University in 1954, and Wayne State University Law School in 1960.

== Military career ==
Starr served in the United States Army from 1954 to 1956 and was stationed in Germany for two years.

== Career ==
Starr was an attorney. On November 4, 1964, Starr was elected to the Michigan House of Representatives where he represented the 57th district from January 13, 1965, to December 31, 1966. Starr was defeated when he sought re-election in 1966. In 1969, Starr was defeated in the Democratic primary for the mayor of Lansing.

== Personal life ==
In 1958, Starr married Phyllis Anne McConnell. Together, they had three children.

== Death ==
Starr died on July 20, 2009, in Lansing, Michigan. He was interred at Evergreen Cemetery in Lansing.
