= Bruce L. Monks =

American politician (1923–2014)

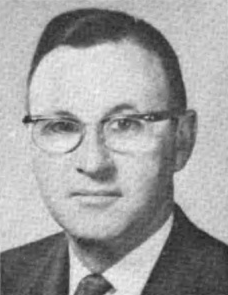

Member of the Michigan House of Representatives from the 71st district
- In office January 13, 1965 – December 31, 1966
- Preceded by: District established
- Succeeded by: Allen F. Rush

Personal details
- Born: November 8, 1923 Lansing, Michigan
- Died: August 22, 2014 (aged 90)
- Party: Democratic
- Education: Michigan State University; Detroit College of Law

Military service
- Allegiance: United States
- Branch/service: United States Army
- Years of service: 1945-1946
- Rank: Corporal

Bruce Lawrence Monks (November 8, 1923 – August 22, 2014) was a Michigan politician.

== Early life and education ==
Monks was born on November 8, 1923, in Lansing, Michigan, and graduated from Lansing Resurrection High School. In 1945, Monks earned an A.B. degree from Michigan State University. In 1952, Monks earned a J.D. degree from the Detroit College of Law.

== Army career ==
From August 1945 to 1946, Monks served in the United States Army and became a corporal. While in the Army, he deployed overseas in March 1946 after World War II as a chief clerk and information assistant and served in the Philippines.

== Career ==
Prior to serving in the Army, Monks worked for the United Press association as a teletype operator and reporter. He later became a lawyer. Monks was a member the State Bar of Michigan as well as the Macomb County Bar Association. From 1956 to 1959, Monks served as a justice of the peace in Clinton Township, Macomb County, Michigan. Monks served a supervisor of the same township from 1961 to 1965. On November 4, 1964, Monks was elected to the Michigan House of Representatives where he represented the 71st district from January 13, 1965, to December 31, 1966. On November 8, 1966, Monks was defeated in his attempt at re-election.

== Personal life ==
Bruce lived in Mount Clemens, Michigan. Bruce was married twice. His first wife was Barbara, and his second wife was Estelle T. Ura. Estelle died on November 17, 2006. Bruce had five children. Bruce was Catholic, and was a member of the Knights of Columbus.

== Death ==
Monks died on August 22, 2014. He was interred in Resurrection Cemetery in Clinton Township.
