= William V. Weber =

American politician

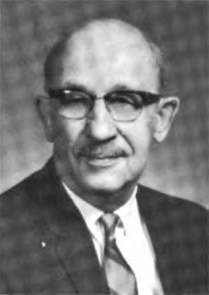

Member of the Michigan House of Representatives from the 46th district
- In office January 1, 1967 – December 31, 1972
- Preceded by: Homer Arnett
- Succeeded by: Howard Wolpe

Personal details
- Born: November 9, 1901 Viroqua, Wisconsin
- Died: 1989
- Party: Republican
- Education: University of Iowa (Ph.D., M.A., B.A.)

Military service
- Allegiance: United States
- Branch/service: United States Navy
- Years of service: 1943-1946
- Rank: Commander

William V. Weber (November 9, 1901 – 1989), was a member of the Michigan House of Representatives.

He was born in Viroqua, Wisconsin. During World War II, he served in the United States Navy. He was a Congregationalist.

== Political career ==
Weber was a member of the House of Representatives from 1967 to 1972. Previously, he was a member of the Michigan Republican State Committee in 1963.
