= Arnell Engstrom =

American businessman and politician

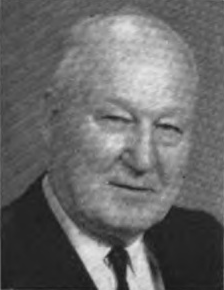
- Born: June 6, 1897; Traverse City, Michigan, U.S.
- Died: May 23, 1970 (aged 72); Traverse City, Michigan, U.S.
- Occupations: Businessman, politician
- Spouse: Mareda Heiges
- Children: 2 sons

Arnell Engstrom (1897-1970) was an American businessman and politician. He was the co-owner of the Engstrom-Hicks Insurance Agency. He served as a Republican member of the Michigan House of Representatives from 1940 to 1968.
