= George F. Montgomery Jr. =

American politician from Michigan

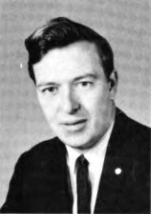
Michigan State Representative George F. Montgomery Jr.

George F. Montgomery Jr. (born August 21, 1933) was an American politician.

Born in Ann Arbor, Michigan, Montgomery graduated from Cass Technical High School in Detroit, Michigan. He then served in the United States Army from 1956 to 1958. In 1959, Montgomery received his bachelor's degree from Wayne State University. He taught in public schools. He served in the Michigan House of Representatives, where he represented the 21st district from 1965 to 1970, and was a Democrat. His father George F. Montgomery Sr. also served in the Michigan Legislature.
