= Joseph J. Kowalski =

American politician

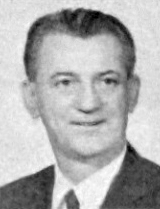

58th Speaker of the Michigan House of Representatives
- In office January 4, 1965 – December 31, 1966
- Preceded by: Allison Green
- Succeeded by: Robert E. Waldron

Member of the Michigan House of Representatives from the 19th district Wayne County 1st District (1949–1954) Wayne County 10th District (1955–1964)
- In office January 1, 1949 – March 18, 1967 Serving with F. Dingman (1949–1960) E. Carey, E. Currie, J. Fitzpatrick, P. Kelly, C. Lewandowski, D. Lindsay, F. Mahoney, M. Novak, S. Novak, M. O'Brien, J. O'Connor, J. Penczak, T. Wilk, and R. Thomson (1949–1954) M. Griffiths and T. O'Brien (1949–1952) T. Doll, N. Edwards, J. Fuller, and P. O'Malley (1949–1950) E. Jeffries, T. Lesinski, G. Murphy, and C. White (1951–1954) J. Beck and F. Williams (1953–1954) F. Dingman (1955–1960) J. Gillis (1961–1964)
- Preceded by: P. Arnold, E. Baker, J. Cochran, T. Dowling, C. Ferris, J. FitzGerald, E. Frey, H. Gage, R. Henderson, C. Hoffman, A. Kurtz, T. Lane, S. Littlefield, J. Maurer, H. McDonald, Jr., K. Metcalfe, N. Patterson, A. Polk, D.Reid, C. Stephens, and P. Williams
- Succeeded by: Anthony C. Licata

Personal details
- Born: February 19, 1911 East Chicago, Indiana
- Died: March 18, 1967 (aged 56)
- Party: Democratic
- Education: Valparaiso University

Joseph J. Kowalski (1911–1967) was a Democratic politician from Michigan who served as Speaker of the Michigan House of Representatives. Involved in labor since 1936, Kowalski was elected to the House in 1948 representing part of Wayne County, and remained in the House

Kowalski entered labor in 1936 as an organizer in Indiana, Ohio and Michigan for the American Federation of State, County and Municipal Employees. He also served on the advisory committee on workers' education to the U. S. Secretary of Labor and in several other labor roles, including international representative of the UAW-CIO.

After a defeat in 1946, Kowalski was elected to the House of Representatives in 1948. He was elected Speaker for the 73rd Legislature, the first Democratic speaker since 1938. During his tenure, the Legislature worked to implement the new state constitution which was adopted in 1964.

Kowalski was an alternate delegate to the Democratic National Convention in both 1960 and 1964.
