= Raymond J. Smit =

American politician (1928–2026)

Member of the Michigan House of Representatives
- In office 1966–1974

Personal details
- Born: Raymond Jacob Smit; September 21, 1928 Detroit, Michigan, U.S.
- Died: July 29, 2026 (aged 97) Marysville, Ohio, U.S.
- Party: Republican
- Education: University of Michigan

Raymond Jacob Smit (September 21, 1928 – July 29, 2026) was an American politician. A member of the Republican Party, he served in the Michigan House of Representatives from 1966 to 1974.

Smit died in Marysville, Ohio on July 29, 2026, at the age of 97.
