= Jack Gingrass =

American politician

Jack L. Gingrass
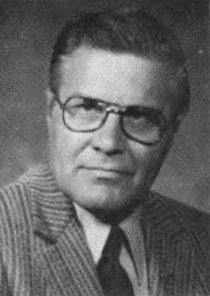

Member of the Michigan House of Representatives from the 109th district
- In office January 1, 1973 – December 31, 1984
- Preceded by: John D. Payant
- Succeeded by: Jim Connors
- In office January 1, 1967 – December 31, 1968
- Preceded by: James K. Constantini
- Succeeded by: John D. Payant

Personal details
- Born: August 27, 1921 Marquette, Michigan
- Died: January 23, 2010 (aged 88) Iron Mountain, Michigan
- Party: Democratic
- Spouse: Betty Jenkins
- Education: Northern Michigan University

Military service
- Allegiance: United States of America
- Branch/service: United States Army Air Corps
- Battles/wars: World War II

Jack L. Gingrass (27 August 1921 – 23 January 2010) was an American politician who was a Democratic member of the Michigan House of Representatives, representing a portion of the Upper Peninsula in the 1960s and 1970s.

After attending Northern Michigan University, Gingrass served in the United States Army Air Corps during World War II. Gingrass was elected to the House in 1966 and served one term before being defeated for re-election by John Payant. Gingrass won the rematch in 1972 and served through 1984. After leaving the Legislature, he was appointed to the Lake Superior State University board of control where he served until his appointment to the Michigan State Transportation Commission by Governor John Engler in 1991. In 2000, he retired from the commission. Gingrass owned and operated a printing company, retiring from that in 2008.
