= Hal Ziegler =

American politician (1932–2012)

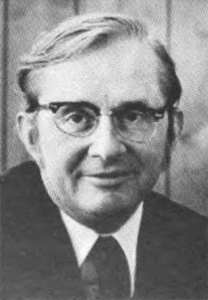
Hal Ziegler c. 1977

Hal Ziegler (August 23, 1932 – November 11, 2012) was an American politician.

Born in Jackson, Michigan, Zieger was a lawyer. He also served as a Republican in the Michigan House of Representatives 1967-1974, and then in the Michigan State Senate from 1975-1978.
