= Einar E. Erlandsen =

American politician

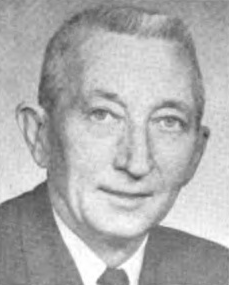

Member of the Michigan House of Representatives from the 107th district
- In office January 13, 1965 – December 31, 1966
- Preceded by: District established
- Succeeded by: Charles H. Varnum

Member of the Michigan House of Representatives from the Delta County district
- In office January 5, 1949 – December 31, 1964
- Preceded by: Roy Albert Jensen
- Succeeded by: District abolished

Personal details
- Born: April 27, 1908 Escanaba, Michigan, US
- Died: March 24, 1995 (aged 86) Escanaba, Michigan, US
- Party: Democratic

Einar Eugene Erlandsen (April 27, 1908 – March 24, 1995) was a Michigan politician.

== Early life and education ==
Erlandsen was born on April 27, 1908, in Escanaba, Michigan, to Norwegian parents. Erlandsen attended public school, and received a high school education in Escanaba.

== Career ==
Erlandsen worked for 23 years as a paper maker for Escanaba Paper Company. He played a key role in organizing a credit union for the company in 1941, and served as the elected treasurer and manager of the credit union until 1948. On November 2, 1948, Erlandsen was elected to the Michigan House of Representatives where he represented the Delta County district from January 5, 1949, to December 31, 1964. On November 4, 1964, Erlandsen was again elected to the Michigan House of Representatives where he represented the 107th district from January 13, 1965, to December 31, 1966. Erlandsen was defeated when he sought re-election in 1966, and again in 1968. In 1956, Erlandsen was a delegate to the Democratic National Convention.

== Personal life ==
Erlandsen married Rose M. McMahon on June 17, 1933. Together, they had one child. Erlandsen was Lutheran.

== Death ==
Erlandsen died on March 24, 1995, in Escanaba. He was interred at Gardens of Rest Cemetery in Wells Township, Delta County, Michigan.
