= William B. Fitzgerald =

American politician

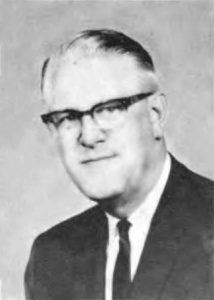

Member of the Michigan House of Representatives from the 4th district
- In office January 1, 1965 – December 7, 1970
- Preceded by: District established
- Succeeded by: William B. Fitzgerald Jr.

Personal details
- Born: February 3, 1914 Troy, New York
- Died: December 7, 1970 (aged 56) Detroit, Michigan
- Party: Democratic
- Children: 2, including William

William B. Fitzgerald Sr. (February 3, 1914 – December 7, 1970) was a Michigan politician.

== Early life ==
Fitzgerald was born on February 3, 1914, in Troy, New York.

== Career ==
On November 7, 1978, Fitzgerald was elected to the Michigan House of Representatives where he represented the 4th district from January 13, 1965, until his death in office on December 7, 1970.

== Personal life ==
Fitzgerald had two children, including fellow state representative William B. Fitzgerald Jr. William B. Fitzgerald's brother, George S. Fitzgerald, was also a state legislator. Fitzgerald was Catholic.
