= Melvin DeStigter =

American politician (1928–2003)

Melvin John DeStigter
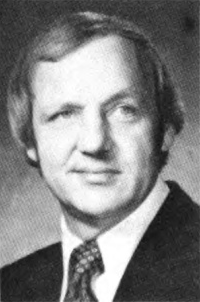

28th Clerk of the Michigan House of Representatives
- In office January 13, 1993 – December 30, 1996 Serving with David Evans (1993-1994)
- Succeeded by: Mary Kay Scullion

Assistant Clerk of the Michigan House of Representatives
- In office January 1979 – 1992
- Preceded by: Wilfred Bassett

Member of the Michigan House of Representatives from the 95th district
- In office January 1, 1965 – December 31, 1978
- Preceded by: District created
- Succeeded by: Jim Dressel

Personal details
- Born: November 21, 1928 Sioux Center, Iowa
- Died: August 7, 2003 (aged 74)
- Party: Republican
- Spouse: Carol

Military service
- Allegiance: United States
- Branch/service: United States Army

Melvin John DeStigter (1928-2003) was a Republican member, assistant clerk, and clerk of the Michigan House of Representatives, totaling just over three decades of service to the chamber.

A native of Iowa, DeStigter served in the United States Army following the Second World War, and, after moving to Michigan, graduated from Calvin College and studied at the University of Michigan. He was a member of the Hudsonville city commission for five years.

DeStigter won election to the House in 1964 and was re-elected six times. While in the House, he sponsored legislation creating an income tax credit for donations to state colleges and universities. He retired as a legislator in 1978, but was appointed assistant clerk of the House in 1979. He served as assistant clerk through 1992, and was then co-clerk during the unique "shared power arrangement" in 1993-1994. In 1995, DeStigter was elected clerk, and retired at the end of the session in 1996 after 32 years of service in the House.

DeStigter died of cancer on August 7, 2003, aged 74.
