= Robert E. Waldron =

American politician from Michigan

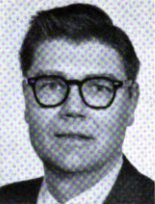

59th Speaker of the Michigan House of Representatives
- In office January 11, 1967 – December 31, 1968
- Preceded by: Joseph J. Kowalski
- Succeeded by: William A. Ryan

Member of the Michigan House of Representatives
- In office January 1, 1955 – December 31, 1970
- Preceded by: Ernest Murphy
- Succeeded by: William R. Bryant, Jr.
- Constituency: Wayne County 13th district (1955-1964); 1st district (1965-1970)

Personal details
- Born: January 25, 1920 Brookline, Massachusetts
- Died: October 25, 2000 (aged 80) Okemos, Michigan
- Party: Republican
- Spouse: Helen
- Education: Dartmouth College; University of Michigan

Military service
- Allegiance: United States of America
- Branch/service: United States Army
- Rank: Captain

Robert Edwin Waldron (January 25, 1920 – October 25, 2000) was a Republican politician from Michigan who served in the Michigan House of Representatives, and as Speaker of the House in 1967 and 1968. He was the last Republican Speaker until Paul Hillegonds 25 years later.
