= William A. Ryan =

American politician from Michigan

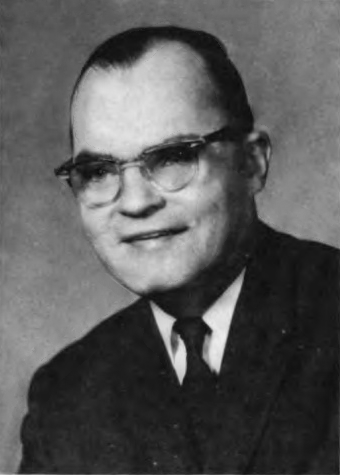

60th Speaker of the Michigan House of Representatives
- In office January 8, 1969 – December 31, 1974
- Preceded by: Robert E. Waldron
- Succeeded by: Bobby Crim

Member of the Michigan House of Representatives
- In office January 1, 1973 – December 31, 1982
- Preceded by: Ed Carey
- Succeeded by: Joe Young, Sr.
- Constituency: Wayne County 3rd district (1958-1964); 3rd district (1965-1972); 14th district (1973-1982)

Personal details
- Born: William Aloysius Ryan; May 2, 1919 Morgantown, West Virginia
- Died: October 9, 2001 (aged 82) Holt, Michigan
- Resting place: St. Joseph Cemetery, Lansing, Michigan
- Party: Democratic
- Spouse: Virginia

Military service
- Allegiance: United States of America
- Branch/service: United States Marine Corps

William Aloysius Ryan (May 2, 1919 - October 9, 2001) was a Democratic politician from Michigan who served as a member of the Michigan House of Representatives, and was Speaker of the House from 1969 through 1974. Ryan was also the president and financial secretary for UAW Local 104. Ryan also served as Clerk of the House in 1983 and 1984.

== See also ==
- List of Michigan state legislatures
