= James Folks =

American politician (1897–2001)

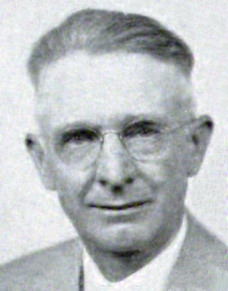

Member of the Michigan House of Representatives
- In office 1955–1972
- Preceded by: Leo Miller
- Succeeded by: Dan Angel
- Constituency: Jackson County 2nd district (1955–1964); 49th district (1965–1972)

Personal details
- Born: October 19, 1897 Hanover, Michigan, U.S.
- Died: January 20, 2001 (aged 103) Marshall, Michigan, U.S.
- Party: Republican
- Spouse: Jeannie
- Children: five
- Education: Michigan State University
- Profession: farmer, bank director

James N. Folks (October 19, 1897 – January 20, 2001) was an American politician in the state of Michigan. He served in the Michigan House of Representatives from 1955 to 1972, representing the 2nd district (Jackson County) as a Republican.
