= Richard A. Young (politician) =

American politician

Michigan State Representative Richard A. Young

Richard A. Young (January 16, 1927 – September 9, 2009) was an American politician. A member of the Democratic Party, he served in the Michigan House of Representatives from 1965 to 1994.

Young died on September 9, 2009, at the age of 82.
