= Joyce Symons (American politician) =

American politician

Joyce Symons (September 10, 1927 – June 14, 1994) was an American politician. A member of the Democratic Party, she served in the Michigan House of Representatives from 1965 to 1983.
