= James Bradley (politician) =

American politician (1914–1997)

James Howard Bradley (January 9, 1914 – October 1997) was a real estate businessman, constable, city clerk, and state legislator in Michigan. He lived in Detroit. He was a Democrat. He served as constable in Wayne County, Michigan.

He was born in Hope, Arkansas. Samuel and Bessie Bradley were his parents. He married Ethel Mallory in 1935 and they had eight children, four boys and four girls. He served in 10 sessions of the Michigan House from 1954 to 1974. He was a member of the masons.

Bradley was drafted into World War II on October 16, 1940 with his draft card listing his residence as Detroit, his employer as the Roosevelt Park Postoffice and his wife as Ethel Bradley.

Auto dealer and city clerk Jim Bradley (1936–2003) was his son.
