= 1992 Michigan House of Representatives election =

- November 3, 1992

All 110 seats in the Michigan House of Representatives 56 seats needed for a majority
	Majority party	Minority party
Leader	Paul Hillegonds	Lewis N. Dodak (unseated)
Party	Republican	Democratic
Leader since	1987	1989
Leader's seat	54th district	86th district
Last election	49	61
Seats before	50	59
Seats after	55	55
Seat change	▲5	▼4
Popular vote	1,864,434	1,844,326
Percentage	49.78%	49.24%
Speaker before election
Lewis N. Dodak
Democratic
Elected Speaker
Curtis Hertel
Democratic
Paul Hillegonds
Republican

An election was held on November 3, 1992, to elect all 110 members of the Michigan House of Representatives for the 87th Michigan Legislature. The election resulted in an even 55–55 split of Democrat and Republican members in the chamber.

== History ==
In the 1990 general election, the Democrats increased their majority in the state House by one, resulting in a 61–49 partisan split over the Republicans. In January 1992, Democratic state representative Teola Pearl Hunter resigned to become deputy director of Wayne Count Health and Human Services. Republican Governor John Engler decided to hold the special election to fill Hunter's vacancy in the state House alongside the 1992 general election in November. In May 1992, Democrat Sal Rocca defected to the Republican Party, further decreasing the Democratic majority in the state House.

The 1992 primary election was held on August 4. There were six incumbents ousted in the primaries. They were Democrats Jerry Bartnik, Hansen Clarke, and Chester Wozniak, as well as Republicans Ralph Ostling, Alvin Hoekman, and Georgina F. Goss. These were the first elections following redistricting based on the 1990 census. Due to redistricting, three of the defeated incumbents, Bartnik, Clarke, and Hoekman, were ousted by other incumbents Lynn Owen, Joe Young Jr., and Jessie Dalman, respectively. Some primary races were close enough to trigger recounts. Incumbent Republicans Jack Horton and Richard D. Allen had their victories affirmed by recounts. Republican Roland Jersevic's one vote lead over Jerome E. Burns was raised to two after a recount, affirming his victory.

The general election was held on November 3. Initial unofficial results showed the Republicans winning a 56–54 in the state House, which would have been the first Republican majority in the chamber since 1968. Further results, however, showed that the election had produced an even 55–55 split of Democrats and Republicans in the state House. There were 6 close races that got recounts in the following districts: 21st, 29th, 47th, 94th, and 104th, and 106th. The recounts did not change the winners in any of the races, preserving the 55–55 split. There were five incumbents ousted in the general. One of them was incumbent speaker Lewis N. Dodak.

Following the election, Curtis Hertel was elected to lead the House Democrats, and Paul Hillegonds was re-elected to lead the House Republicans. On January 13, 1993, 109 of the 110 members of the state House were sworn in, one Democrat being absent. The same day, the state House ratified a power sharing agreement, and elected Hertel and Hillegonds as co-speakers of the state House. The two men would alternate serving as speaker every month.

== Results ==
The following are the official results from the 1993–1994 Michigan Manual.

=== Statewide ===
Party	Candi- dates	Votes (Note: There were mathematical errors in the official results printed in the Michigan Manual in the 45th district and the 86th district. Errors in the 45th district results have been preserved in this article and in the calculation of the statewide totals.)		Seats		
Party	Candi- dates	No.	%	No.	+/–	%
Republican Party	110	1,864,434	49.78%	55	▲5	50.00%
Democratic Party	97	1,844,326	49.24%	55	▼4	50.00%
Independent	11	21,598	0.57%	0	Steady	0.00%
Libertarian Party	12	10,185	0.27%	0	Steady	0.00%
Tisch Independent Citizens Party	11	2,338	0.06%	0	Steady	0.00%
Write-ins		1,583	0.04%	0	Steady	0.00%
Workers World Party	2	583	0.01%	0	Steady	0.00%
Total	236	3,745,047	100.00%	110	Steady	100.00%

=== By district ===
1st District (Wayne County)
Party	Candidate	Votes	%
Republican	William R. Bryant Jr. (incumbent)	27,331	64.74
Democratic	Elaine Hartmann	14,878	35.24
Write-in		2	0.00
Total votes		42,211	100.0

2nd District (Wayne County)
Party	Candidate	Votes	%
Democratic	Curtis Hertel (incumbent)	18,428	84.53
Republican	Robert Ridley	2,997	13.74
Tisch Independent	Robert Gale	374	1.71
Total votes		21,799	100.0

3rd District (Wayne County)
Party	Candidate	Votes	%
Democratic	Joe Young Sr. (incumbent)	22,662	91.84
Republican	Andrea Harris	1,450	5.87
Independent	William Tinsley	561	2.27
Total votes		24,673	100.0

4th District (Wayne County)
Party	Candidate	Votes	%
Democratic	Joe Young Jr. (incumbent)	22,544	94.99
Republican	Dovie Pickett	1,187	5.00
Total votes		23,731	100.0

5th District (Wayne County)
Party	Candidate	Votes	%
Democratic	Ted Wallace (incumbent)	20,410	86.80
Republican	Beverly Hatcher	3,102	13.19
Write-in		1	0.00
Total votes		23,513	100.0

6th District (Wayne County)
Party	Candidate	Votes	%
Democratic	David S. Points	21,074	89.94
Republican	Raymond Prus	2,356	10.05
Write-in		1	0.00
Total votes		23,431	100.0

7th District (Wayne County)
Party	Candidate	Votes	%
Democratic	Raymond M. Murphy (incumbent)	24,165	93.11
Republican	John Scarberry	1,201	4.62
Independent	Connie McConnohie	585	2.25
Total votes		25,951	100.0

8th District (Wayne County)
Party	Candidate	Votes	%
Democratic	Ilona Varga (incumbent)	16,716	86.21
Republican	Dorothy Patterson	2,671	13.77
Write-in		2	0.01
Total votes		19,389	100.0

9th District (Wayne County)
Party	Candidate	Votes	%
Democratic	Carolyn Cheeks Kilpatrick (incumbent)	24,198	93.98
Republican	Christopher Flournoy	1,313	5.09
Workers World	Gertrude Cook	237	0.92
Total votes		25,748	100.0

10th District (Wayne County)
Party	Candidate	Votes	%
Democratic	Nelson Saunders (incumbent)	31,752	94.55
Republican	Cheryl Taylor	1,829	5.44
Total votes		33,581	100.0

11th District (Wayne County)
Party	Candidate	Votes	%
Democratic	Morris Hood Jr. (incumbent)	25,343	89.74
Republican	Thelma Castillo-Dominguez	2,337	8.27
Independent	Harold Echols	557	1.97
Write-in		2	0.00
Total votes		28,239	100.0

12th District (Wayne County)
Party	Candidate	Votes	%
Democratic	Alma G. Stallworth (incumbent)	30,101	94.08
Republican	Bill Ashe	1,606	5.01
Libertarian	Jonathan Flint	286	0.89
Total votes		31,993	100.0

13th District (Wayne County)
Party	Candidate	Votes	%
Democratic	Burton Leland (incumbent)	21,471	90.51
Republican	Tony Spearman-Leach	2,250	9.48
Total votes		23,721	100.0

14th District (Wayne County)
Party	Candidate	Votes	%
Democratic	Michael J. Bennane (incumbent)	20,403	86.98
Republican	Joyce James	2,490	10.61
Independent	Howard Worthy	563	2.40
Total votes		23,456	100.0

15th District (Wayne County)
Party	Candidate	Votes	%
Democratic	Agnes Dobronski (incumbent)	21,475	52.96
Republican	Douglas Thomas	19,068	47.03
Total votes		40,543	100.0

16th District (Wayne County)
Party	Candidate	Votes	%
Democratic	Richard Young (incumbent)	21,228	51.86
Republican	James Carey	17,719	43.29
Independent	Bill Parrott	1,979	4.83
Total votes		40,926	100.0

17th District (Wayne County)
Party	Candidate	Votes	%
Democratic	William R. Keith (incumbent)	20,127	70.34
Republican	Edward Juarez	8,481	29.64
Write-in		2	0.00
Total votes		28,610	100.0

18th District (Wayne County)
Party	Candidate	Votes	%
Democratic	Justine Barns (incumbent)	17,306	55.07
Republican	Steve Cabrera	14,118	44.92
Write-in		1	0.00
Total votes		31,425	100.0

19th District (Wayne County)
Party	Candidate	Votes	%
Republican	Lyn Bankes (incumbent)	26,248	99.98
Write-in		4	0.01
Total votes		26,252	100.0

20th District (Wayne County)
Party	Candidate	Votes	%
Republican	Jerry Vorva	30,113	99.88
Write-in		36	0.11
Total votes		30,149	100.0

21st District (Note: There was a recount in the 21st district. Before the recount, the results had shown Deborah Whyman with 17,148 votes, Jim Kosteva with 17,014, and a vote total of 34,138.) (Wayne County)
Party	Candidate	Votes	%
Republican	Deborah Whyman	17,148	50.19
Democratic	Jim Kosteva (incumbent)	17,014	49.80
Total votes		34,162	100.0

22nd District (Wayne County)
Party	Candidate	Votes	%
Democratic	Gregory Pitoniak (incumbent)	19,494	71.05
Republican	Martin Simi II	7,940	28.94
Write-in		1	0.00
Total votes		27,435	100.0

23rd District (Wayne County)
Party	Candidate	Votes	%
Democratic	Vincent Porreca (incumbent)	23,801	63.35
Republican	Walter Barron Jr.	13,763	36.63
Write-in		3	0.00
Total votes		37,567	100.0

24th District (Wayne County)
Party	Candidate	Votes	%
Democratic	Joseph Palamara (incumbent)	24,788	71.62
Republican	Thomas Roberts	9,820	28.37
Total votes		34,608	100.0

25th District (Wayne County)
Party	Candidate	Votes	%
Democratic	Robert DeMars (incumbent)	23,389	73.20
Republican	Thomas Emery	8,563	26.79
Total votes		31,952	100.0

26th District (Macomb County)
Party	Candidate	Votes	%
Democratic	Tracey Yokich (incumbent)	22,638	50.67
Republican	Peter Lund	20,821	46.60
Libertarian	Keith Edwards	870	1.94
Workers World	Beverley Bloedel	346	0.77
Total votes		44,675	100.0

27th District (Macomb County)
Party	Candidate	Votes	%
Democratic	Nick Ciaramitaro (incumbent)	25,561	68.67
Republican	R. Bedra	11,656	31.31
Write-in		1	0.00
Total votes		37,218	100.0

28th District (Macomb County)
Party	Candidate	Votes	%
Democratic	Lloyd F. Weeks (incumbent)	20,643	64.70
Republican	John Horton	9,509	29.80
Independent	Karen Roberts	1,750	5.48
Write-in		1	0.00
Total votes		31,903	100.0

29th District (Note: There was a recount in the 29th district. Before the recount, the results had shown Dennis Olshove with 22,348 votes, John Chmura with 22,342, and a vote total of 44,690 votes.) (Macomb County)
Party	Candidate	Votes	%
Democratic	Dennis Olshove (incumbent)	22,354	50.00
Republican	John Chmura	22,347	49.99
Total votes		44,701	100.0

30th District (Macomb County)
Party	Candidate	Votes	%
Republican	Sal Rocca (incumbent)	23,950	59.66
Democratic	Ken Lampar	16,193	40.33
Write-in		1	0.00
Total votes		40,144	100.0

31st District (Macomb County)
Party	Candidate	Votes	%
Democratic	Sharon Gire (incumbent)	24,112	65.89
Republican	Harold Perry	12,481	34.10
Total votes		36,593	100.0

32nd District (Macomb County)
Party	Candidate	Votes	%
Republican	David Jaye (incumbent)	21,938	54.42
Democratic	Steve Kostiuk	12,550	31.13
Independent	Bill Browne	5,822	14.44
Total votes		40,310	100.0

33rd District (Macomb County)
Party	Candidate	Votes	%
Republican	Alvin H. Kukuk	19,825	52.28
Democratic	Kenneth DeBeaussaert (incumbent)	18,091	47.71
Write-in		1	0.00
Total votes		37,917	100.0

34th District (Oakland County)
Party	Candidate	Votes	%
Democratic	John Freeman	17,107	53.24
Republican	Michael McColloch	15,024	46.75
Total votes		32,131	100.0

35th District (Oakland County)
Party	Candidate	Votes	%
Democratic	David Gubow (incumbent)	25,349	70.90
Republican	Marc Wanat	8,890	24.86
Independent	Peter Friedlander	1,511	4.22
Total votes		35,750	100.0

36th District (Oakland County)
Party	Candidate	Votes	%
Democratic	Maxine Berman (incumbent)	27,983	73.27
Republican	Lawrence Stack	10,207	26.72
Total votes		38,190	100.0

37th District (Oakland County)
Party	Candidate	Votes	%
Republican	Jan C. Dolan (incumbent)	31,196	72.44
Democratic	Robert Jurczyk	11,865	27.55
Write-in		1	0.00
Total votes		43,062	100.0

38th District (Oakland County)
Party	Candidate	Votes	%
Republican	Bill Bullard Jr. (incumbent)	22,980	66.36
Democratic	Robert Havey	11,113	32.09
Libertarian	K. Elsholz	536	1.54
Total votes		34,629	100.0

39th District (Oakland County)
Party	Candidate	Votes	%
Republican	Barbara Dobb (incumbent)	26,648	59.02
Democratic	Kirk Nemer	17,255	38.21
Libertarian	David Nagy	1,209	2.67
Write-in		36	0.07
Total votes		45,148	100.0

40th District (Oakland County)
Party	Candidate	Votes	%
Republican	John Jamian (incumbent)	33,518	71.25
Democratic	Scott Sitner	13,508	28.71
Write-in		12	0.02
Total votes		47,038	100.0

41st District (Oakland County)
Party	Candidate	Votes	%
Republican	Shirley Johnson (incumbent)	26,948	67.11
Democratic	Rhonda Ross	12,266	30.54
Tisch Independent	Matthew Uhelski	937	2.33
Total votes		40,151	100.0

42nd District (Oakland County)
Party	Candidate	Votes	%
Republican	Greg Kaza	24,075	64.70
Democratic	Jon Buller	13,135	35.29
Total votes		37,210	100.0

43rd District (Oakland County)
Party	Candidate	Votes	%
Democratic	Charlie Harrison Jr. (incumbent)	16,812	66.52
Republican	John Bueno	8,460	33.47
Total votes		25,272	100.0

44th District (Oakland County)
Party	Candidate	Votes	%
Republican	David Galloway	21,768	55.45
Democratic	Bill Glover	17,483	44.54
Total votes		39,251	100.0

45th District (Oakland County)
Party	Candidate	Votes	%
Republican	Penny Crissman	27,119	71.55
Democratic	Connie McNealy	10,772	28.42
Total votes		37,900	100.0

46th District (Oakland County)
Party	Candidate	Votes	%
Republican	Tom F. Middleton (incumbent)	24,397	66.68
Democratic	Joseph Herronen	10,939	29.89
Libertarian	Scott Scarborough	1,239	3.38
Write-in		11	0.03
Total votes		36,586	100.0

47th District (Note: There was a recount in the 47th district. Before the recount, the results had shown Sandra Hill with 20,119 votes, Nate Jonker with 20,090, Vern Schultz with 1,893, 1 write-in vote, and a vote total of 42,103.) (Genesee County)
Party	Candidate	Votes	%
Republican	Sandra Hill	20,130	47.79
Democratic	Nate Jonker (incumbent)	20,096	47.71
Independent	Vern Schultz	1,893	4.49
Write-in		1	0.00
Total votes		42,120	100.0

48th District (Genesee County)
Party	Candidate	Votes	%
Democratic	Floyd Clack (incumbent)	27,569	87.88
Republican	John Callahan	3,800	12.11
Write-in		1	0.00
Total votes		31,370	100.0

49th District (Genesee County)
Party	Candidate	Votes	%
Democratic	Robert L. Emerson (incumbent)	25,250	77.69
Republican	Lawrence Romanowski	7,247	22.30
Total votes		32,497	100.0

50th District (Genesee County)
Party	Candidate	Votes	%
Democratic	Thomas Scott (incumbent)	21,519	52.16
Republican	Paula Zelenko	19,733	47.83
Total votes		41,252	100.0

51st District (Genesee County)
Party	Candidate	Votes	%
Democratic	Candace A. Curtis	24,231	53.63
Republican	David B. Robertson (incumbent)	20,947	46.36
Total votes		45,178	100.0

52nd District (Washtenaw County)
Party	Candidate	Votes	%
Democratic	Mary Schroer	22,921	54.85
Republican	Mark Ouimet	18,858	45.13
Write-in		3	0.00
Total votes		41,782	100.0

53rd District (Washtenaw County)
Party	Candidate	Votes	%
Democratic	Lynn Rivers	24,937	68.45
Republican	Terrence Bertram	11,077	30.40
Tisch Independent	Pat Burkard	412	1.13
Write-in		1	0.00
Total votes		36,427	100.0

54th District (Washtenaw County)
Party	Candidate	Votes	%
Democratic	Kirk Profit (incumbent)	19,946	63.63
Republican	Avery Heningburg	10,720	34.20
Libertarian	Frederick Weihe	675	2.15
Write-in		1	0.00
Total votes		31,342	100.0

55th District (Lenawee County, Monroe County, Washtenaw County)
Party	Candidate	Votes	%
Republican	Beverly Hammerstrom	18,872	51.80
Democratic	James Douglas	17,553	48.18
Write-in		1	0.00
Total votes		36,426	100.0

56th District (Monroe County)
Party	Candidate	Votes	%
Democratic	Lynn Owen (incumbent)	19,814	63.04
Republican	Jeffrey Green	11,612	36.95
Total votes		31,426	100.0

57th District (Lenawee County)
Party	Candidate	Votes	%
Republican	Tim Walberg (incumbent)	19,692	57.67
Democratic	Paul Hill	14,442	42.29
Write-in		9	0.02
Total votes		34,143	100.0

58th District (Branch County, Hillsdale County)
Party	Candidate	Votes	%
Republican	Michael Nye (incumbent)	21,209	72.24
Democratic	Iva Heim	8,146	27.74
Write-in		1	0.00
Total votes		29,356	100.0

59th District (Cass County, St. Joseph County)
Party	Candidate	Votes	%
Republican	Glenn Oxender (incumbent)	21,991	68.20
Democratic	Burke Webb	10,250	31.79
Total votes		32,241	100.0

60th District (Kalamazoo County)
Party	Candidate	Votes	%
Democratic	Mary Brown (incumbent)	19,993	59.45
Republican	Jackie Morrison	13,632	40.54
Total votes		33,625	100.0

61st District (Kalamazoo County)
Party	Candidate	Votes	%
Republican	Dale Shugars (incumbent)	25,921	56.24
Democratic	Betsy Rice	20,167	43.75
Total votes		46,088	100.0

62nd District (Calhoun County)
Party	Candidate	Votes	%
Republican	Bill Martin (incumbent)	23,286	99.93
Write-in		16	0.06
Total votes		23,302	100.0

63rd District (Calhoun County, Kalamazoo County)
Party	Candidate	Votes	%
Republican	Donald Gilmer (incumbent)	24,482	99.96
Write-in		8	0.03
Total votes		24,490	100.0

64th District (Jackson County)
Party	Candidate	Votes	%
Democratic	Michael Griffin (incumbent)	16,437	57.53
Republican	Paul Gazan	12,129	42.45
Write-in		1	0.00
Total votes		28,567	100.0

65th District (Eaton County, Jackson County)
Party	Candidate	Votes	%
Republican	Philip Hoffman (incumbent)	22,736	99.94
Write-in		12	0.05
Total votes		22,748	100.0

66th District (Livingston County)
Party	Candidate	Votes	%
Republican	Susan Munsell (incumbent)	29,043	72.56
Democratic	Carrol Mills	10,982	27.43
Total votes		40,025	100.0

67th District (Ingham County, Livingston County)
Party	Candidate	Votes	%
Republican	Dan Gustafson	20,859	54.45
Democratic	Eric Schertzing	17,447	45.54
Write-in		1	0.00
Total votes		38,307	100.0

68th District (Ingham County)
Party	Candidate	Votes	%
Democratic	Dianne Byrum (incumbent)	24,728	67.75
Republican	Tom Truscott	11,092	30.39
Libertarian	Dale Dobberstein	676	1.85
Write-in		1	0.00
Total votes		36,497	100.0

69th District (Ingham County)
Party	Candidate	Votes	%
Democratic	David Hollister (incumbent)	20,929	65.60
Republican	Thomas Hruska	9,462	29.65
Libertarian	Jon Addiss	894	2.80
Tisch Independent	Raymond Myers	615	1.92
Write-in		2	0.00
Total votes		31,902	100.0

70th District (Ingham County)
Party	Candidate	Votes	%
Democratic	H. Lynn Jondahl (incumbent)	23,327	63.08
Republican	David Rizor	12,595	34.06
Libertarian	Michael Miller	1,052	2.84
Write-in		1	0.00
Total votes		36,975	100.0

71st District (Eaton County)
Party	Candidate	Votes	%
Republican	Frank M. Fitzgerald (incumbent)	25,665	63.37
Democratic	Ron Davis	14,810	36.56
Write-in		23	0.05
Total votes		40,498	100.0

72nd District (Kent County)
Party	Candidate	Votes	%
Republican	Walter DeLange (incumbent)	34,048	99.31
Write-in		234	0.68
Total votes		34,282	100.0

73rd District (Kent County)
Party	Candidate	Votes	%
Republican	Jack Horton (incumbent)	27,699	62.46
Democratic	Catherine Ellis	16,551	37.32
Write-in		95	0.21
Total votes		44,345	100.0

74th District (Kent County, Ottawa County)
Party	Candidate	Votes	%
Republican	Ken Sikkema (incumbent)	26,714	68.17
Democratic	Hans Kliphuis	11,242	28.69
Libertarian	James Pruitt	1,199	3.05
Write-in		29	0.07
Total votes		39,184	100.0

75th District (Kent County)
Party	Candidate	Votes	%
Republican	Richard Bandstra (incumbent)	23,146	60.20
Democratic	C. Ford	15,301	39.79
Write-in		1	0.00
Total votes		38,448	100.0

76th District (Kent County)
Party	Candidate	Votes	%
Democratic	Thomas Mathieu (incumbent)	21,187	63.04
Republican	Stephen Johnson	11,376	33.84
Libertarian	Michael Gillman	1,044	3.10
Write-in		1	0.00
Total votes		33,608	100.0

77th District (Kent County)
Party	Candidate	Votes	%
Republican	Harold Voorhees Sr.	18,785	56.24
Democratic	Michael Uskiewicz	14,616	43.75
Total votes		33,401	100.0

78th District (Berrien County)
Party	Candidate	Votes	%
Republican	Carl Gnodtke (incumbent)	21,386	80.90
Independent	Milt Juister	5,047	19.09
Total votes		26,433	100.0

79th District (Berrien County)
Party	Candidate	Votes	%
Republican	Bob Brackenridge (incumbent)	19,674	60.39
Democratic	Robert Ziebart	12,904	39.60
Total votes		32,578	100.0

80th District (Cass County, Van Buren County)
Party	Candidate	Votes	%
Republican	James Middaugh (incumbent)	19,771	100.0
Total votes		19,771	100.0

81st District (St. Clair County)
Party	Candidate	Votes	%
Republican	Terry London (incumbent)	20,705	53.13
Democratic	James Docherty	18,262	46.86
Total votes		38,967	100.0

82nd District (Lapeer County, St. Clair County)
Party	Candidate	Votes	%
Democratic	Karen Willard	18,990	50.96
Republican	John Strand (incumbent)	18,274	49.03
Total votes		37,264	100.0

83rd District (Lapeer County, Sanilac County)
Party	Candidate	Votes	%
Republican	Kim Rhead	23,072	99.91
Write-in		19	0.08
Total votes		23,091	100.0

84th District (Huron County, Tuscola County)
Party	Candidate	Votes	%
Republican	Richard D. Allen (incumbent)	22,168	99.86
Write-in		29	0.13
Total votes		22,197	100.0

85th District (Clinton County, Shiawassee County)
Party	Candidate	Votes	%
Democratic	Clark Harder (incumbent)	19,473	58.41
Republican	Mike Dvorak	12,513	37.53
Independent	Ben Campbell	1,330	3.98
Write-in		22	0.06
Total votes		33,338	100.0

86th District (Clinton County, Ionia County)
Party	Candidate	Votes	%
Republican	Alan Cropsey	18,907	53.29
Democratic	Dan Sloan	16,562	46.68
Write-in		9	0.02
Total votes		35,478	100.0

87th District (Barry County, Ionia County)
Party	Candidate	Votes	%
Republican	Robert Bender (incumbent)	19,312	64.86
Democratic	Robert Wuelfing	10,459	35.13
Write-in		1	0.00
Total votes		29,772	100.0

88th District (Allegan County)
Party	Candidate	Votes	%
Republican	Paul Hillegonds (incumbent)	26,049	99.83
Write-in		44	0.16
Total votes		26,093	100.0

89th District (Ottawa County)
Party	Candidate	Votes	%
Republican	Leon Stille	31,452	72.69
Democratic	James Dean	11,784	27.23
Write-in		32	0.07
Total votes		43,268	100.0

90th District (Ottawa County)
Party	Candidate	Votes	%
Republican	Jessie Dalman (incumbent)	31,705	75.61
Democratic	Sandra Hansen	10,152	24.21
Write-in		71	0.16
Total votes		41,928	100.0

91st District (Muskegon County)
Party	Candidate	Votes	%
Democratic	Paul Baade (incumbent)	20,127	55.46
Republican	Charles Ritchard	16,156	44.52
Write-in		4	0.01
Total votes		36,287	100.0

92nd District (Muskegon County)
Party	Candidate	Votes	%
Democratic	James Agee	21,515	75.47
Republican	Douglas Twining	6,988	24.51
Write-in		2	0.00
Total votes		28,505	100.0

93rd District (Gratiot County, Montcalm County)
Party	Candidate	Votes	%
Republican	Gary L. Randall (incumbent)	20,447	63.81
Democratic	Richard Ort	11,592	36.18
Total votes		32,039	100.0

94th District (Note: There was a recount in the 94th district. Before the recount, the results had shown Michael Goschka with 19,213 votes, Lewis N. Dodak with 19,080, 3 write-in votes, and a vote total of 28,296.) (Saginaw County)
Party	Candidate	Votes	%
Republican	Michael Goschka	19,264	50.18
Democratic	Lewis N. Dodak (incumbent)	19,122	49.81
Write-in		3	0.00
Total votes		38,389	100.0

95th District (Saginaw County)
Party	Candidate	Votes	%
Democratic	James E. O'Neill Jr. (incumbent)	21,981	83.16
Republican	Marshall Litfield	4,451	16.83
Total votes		26,432	100.0

96th District (Bay County, Saginaw County)
Party	Candidate	Votes	%
Republican	Roland Jersevic	21,792	53.90
Democratic	Michael Lefkiades	18,024	44.58
Write-in		611	1.51
Total votes		40,427	100.0

97th District (Bay County)
Party	Candidate	Votes	%
Democratic	Howard Wetters	20,756	60.23
Republican	Joel Gougeon	13,703	39.76
Total votes		34,459	100.0

98th District (Gratiot County, Midland County)
Party	Candidate	Votes	%
Republican	James R. McNutt (incumbent)	27,981	99.99
Write-in		1	0.00
Total votes		27,982	100.0

99th District (Clare County, Isabella County)
Party	Candidate	Votes	%
Republican	Jim McBryde (incumbent)	19,201	59.73
Democratic	Bob Nelson	12,943	40.26
Write-in		1	0.00
Total votes		32,145	100.0

100th District (Lake County, Mecosta County, Newaygo County)
Party	Candidate	Votes	%
Republican	John Llewellyn	20,075	60.80
Democratic	Errol Kangas	12,913	39.11
Write-in		26	0.07
Total votes		33,014	100.0

101st District (Benzie County, Manistee County, Mason County, Oceana County)
Party	Candidate	Votes	%
Republican	Bill Bobier (incumbent)	25,977	69.56
Democratic	Ronald Wandrych	11,364	30.43
Write-in		1	0.00
Total votes		37,342	100.0

102nd District (Missaukee County, Osceola County, Roscommon County, Wexford County)
Party	Candidate	Votes	%
Republican	John Gernaat (incumbent)	23,026	99.94
Write-in		13	0.05
Total votes		23,039	100.0

103rd District (Arenac County, Gladwin County, Iosco County, Ogemaw County)
Party	Candidate	Votes	%
Democratic	Thomas Alley (incumbent)	23,288	61.28
Republican	Rodney Knepper	14,709	38.70
Write-in		1	0.00
Total votes		37,998	100.0

104th District (Note: There was a recount in the 104th district. Before the recount, the results had shown Michelle McManus with 21,777 votes, Geraldine Greene with 21,517, 113 write-in votes, and a vote total of 43,407.) (Grand Traverse County, Leelanau County)
Party	Candidate	Votes	%
Republican	Michelle McManus	21,800	50.16
Democratic	Geraldine Greene	21,541	49.57
Write-in		113	0.26
Total votes		43,454	100.0

105th District (Alcona County, Antrim County, Crawford County, Kalkaska County, Montmorency County, Oscoda County, Otsego County)
Party	Candidate	Votes	%
Republican	Allen Lowe	22,592	52.95
Democratic	Tom Weiss	19,562	45.85
Libertarian	David Black	505	1.18
Total votes		42,659	100.0

106th District (Note: There was a recount in the 106th district. Before the recount, the results had shown Beverly Bodem with 21,122 votes, G. Long with 20,999, 2 write-in votes, and a vote total of 42,123.) (Alpena County, Charlevoix County, Cheboygan County, Presque Isle County)
Party	Candidate	Votes	%
Republican	Beverly A. Bodem (incumbent)	21,130	50.12
Democratic	G. Long	21,023	49.87
Write-in		2	0.00
Total votes		42,155	100.0

107th District (Chippewa County, Emmet County, Luce County, Mackinac County, Schoolcraft County)
Party	Candidate	Votes	%
Democratic	Pat Gagliardi (incumbent)	20,736	55.15
Republican	Shannon Brower	16,860	44.84
Write-in		3	0.00
Total votes		37,599	100.0

108th District (Delta County, Dickinson County, Menominee County)
Party	Candidate	Votes	%
Democratic	David Anthony (incumbent)	27,861	76.34
Republican	Brian Pritzl	8,619	23.61
Write-in		12	0.03
Total votes		36,492	100.0

109th District (Alger County, Marquette County)
Party	Candidate	Votes	%
Democratic	Dominic Jacobetti (incumbent)	24,068	69.88
Republican	James Alderson	10,369	30.11
Total votes		34,437	100.0

110th District (Baraga County, Gogebic County, Houghton County, Iron County, Keweenaw County, Ontonagon County)
Party	Candidate	Votes	%
Democratic	Stephen Shepich	22,437	60.10
Republican	Fayth Wolfe	14,890	39.88
Write-in		1	0.00
Total votes		37,328	100.0

=== Special election ===
A special election was held in the pre-redistricting, old 5th district of the Michigan House of Representatives on November 3, 1992, held alongside the general election. The special election was triggered by the resignation of Democrat Teola Pearl Hunter on January 17, to become deputy director of Wayne Count Health and Human Services. In late February, Speaker Lewis N. Dodak asked Engler to set a date for the special election, as Governor John Engler hadn't chosen one yet at that time. It took the Republican Governor John Engler five months after Hunter's resignation to select the special election date.

Triette Reeves (then Triette Lipsey) was an aide to Hunter. She defeated Thomas Bliznick in the Democratic primary, and then won the general election unopposed. She was sworn in on November 18. Because she didn't run in the general election, Reeves was only elected to serve in the state House for six weeks.

The following are the official results from the 1993–1994 Michigan Manual.

5th District special election (Wayne County)
Party	Candidate	Votes	%
Democratic	Triette Reeves	20,814	100.0
Total votes		20,814	100.0
Democratic hold			
