= 1990 Michigan House of Representatives election =

- November 6, 1996

All 110 seats in the Michigan House of Representatives 56 seats needed for a majority
| | Majority party | Minority party |
|---|---|---|
| Leader | Lewis N. Dodak | Paul Hillegonds |
| Party | Democratic | Republican |
| Leader since | 1989 | 1987 |
| Leader's seat | 86th district | 54th district |
| Last election | 61 | 49 |
| Seats before | 60 | 50 |
| Seats after | 61 | 49 |
| Seat change | ▲1 | ▼1 |
| Popular vote | 1,255,101 | 1,147,245 |
| Percentage | 51.91% | 47.45% |
Speaker before election
Lewis N. Dodak
Democratic
Elected Speaker
Lewis N. Dodak
Democratic

An election was held on November 6, 1990, to elect all 110 members of the Michigan House of Representatives for the 86th Michigan Legislature. The Democrats had regained the 61–49 majority they won in the previous general election.

== History ==
In the 1988 general election, the Democrats lost three seats, but retained a majority, with 61 members in the state House compared to the Republicans' 49 members. In October 1989, Democrat state representative Dennis Dutko resigned amidst pressure after his conviction for drunk driving, leaving the Democrats with a 60–49 majority. In a special election in January 1990 to fill Dutko's vacancy, Republican D. Roman Kulchitsky was elected, bringing the Republican minority in the state House to 50 members.

The 1990 primary election was held on August 7. The general election was held on November 6. The election flipped five seats. Three seats were flipped by Democrats and two were flipped by Republicans. This meant that the Democrats maintained their majority, and regained the 61–49 partisan split they had after the 1988 election. After the election, Lewis N. Dodak was re-elected state House speaker. Paul Hillegonds was re-elected by Republicans as minority leader.

The state House was sworn in on January 9, 1991.

== Results ==
The following are the official results from the 1991–1992 Michigan Manual.

=== Statewide ===
| Party | Candi- dates | Votes | | Seats | | |
| Party | Candi- dates | No. | % | No. | +/– | % |
|---|---|---|---|---|---|---|
| Democratic Party | 108 | 1,255,101 | 51.91% | 61 | ▲1 | 55.45% |
| Republican Party | 98 | 1,147,245 | 47.45% | 49 | ▼1 | 44.54% |
| Libertarian Party | 12 | 8,171 | 0.33% | 0 | Steady | 0.00% |
| Write-ins | | 3,728 | 0.15% | 0 | Steady | 0.00% |
| Workers World Party | 5 | 1,424 | 0.05% | 0 | Steady | 0.00% |
| Independent | 2 | 1,147 | 0.04% | 0 | Steady | 0.00% |
| Tisch Independent Citizens Party | 1 | 621 | 0.02% | 0 | Steady | 0.00% |
| Total | 226 | 2,417,437 | 100.00% | 110 | Steady | 100.00% |

=== By district ===
1st District (Wayne County)
| Party | Candidate | Votes | % |
|---|---|---|---|
| Democratic | Michael J. Bennane (incumbent) | 10,823 | 83.86 |
| Republican | Sandra Schultz | 1,798 | 13.93 |
| Workers World | Cheryl LaBash | 283 | 2.19 |
| Write-in | | 1 | 0.00 |
| Total votes | | 12,905 | 100.0 |
| Democratic hold | | | |

2nd District (Wayne County)
| Party | Candidate | Votes | % |
|---|---|---|---|
| Democratic | Burton Leland (incumbent) | 10,784 | 82.65 |
| Republican | Cheryl Simon | 2,262 | 17.33 |
| Write-in | | 1 | 0.00 |
| Total votes | | 13,047 | 100.0 |
| Democratic hold | | | |

3rd District (Wayne County)
| Party | Candidate | Votes | % |
|---|---|---|---|
| Democratic | Ilona Varga (incumbent) | 8,647 | 96.20 |
| Workers World | Gertrude Cook | 341 | 3.79 |
| Total votes | | 8,988 | 100.0 |
| Democratic hold | | | |

4th District (Wayne County)
| Party | Candidate | Votes | % |
|---|---|---|---|
| Democratic | Alma G. Stallworth (incumbent) | 15,484 | 95.81 |
| Republican | Verlinda Wallace | 677 | 4.18 |
| Total votes | | 16,161 | 100.0 |
| Democratic hold | | | |

5th District (Wayne County)
| Party | Candidate | Votes | % |
|---|---|---|---|
| Democratic | Teola Pearl Hunter (incumbent) | 10,500 | 100.0 |
| Total votes | | 10,500 | 100.0 |
| Democratic hold | | | |

6th District (Wayne County)
| Party | Candidate | Votes | % |
|---|---|---|---|
| Democratic | Morris Hood Jr. (incumbent) | 10,629 | 96.25 |
| Workers World | Melanie Rios-Nance | 412 | 3.73 |
| Write-in | | 2 | 0.01 |
| Total votes | | 11,043 | 100.0 |
| Democratic hold | | | |

7th District (Wayne County)
| Party | Candidate | Votes | % |
|---|---|---|---|
| Democratic | Nelson Saunders (incumbent) | 14,387 | 100.0 |
| Total votes | | 14,387 | 100.0 |
| Democratic hold | | | |

8th District (Wayne County)
| Party | Candidate | Votes | % |
|---|---|---|---|
| Democratic | Carolyn Cheeks Kilpatrick (incumbent) | 11,220 | 97.33 |
| Republican | Edward Slappey | 307 | 2.66 |
| Total votes | | 11,527 | 100.0 |
| Democratic hold | | | |

9th District (Wayne County)
| Party | Candidate | Votes | % |
|---|---|---|---|
| Democratic | Chester Wozniak | 9,461 | 99.77 |
| Write-in | | 21 | 0.22 |
| Total votes | | 9,482 | 100.0 |
| Democratic hold | | | |

10th District (Wayne County)
| Party | Candidate | Votes | % |
|---|---|---|---|
| Democratic | Ted Wallace (incumbent) | 11,299 | 92.64 |
| Republican | John Gordon | 896 | 7.34 |
| Write-in | | 1 | 0.00 |
| Total votes | | 12,196 | 100.0 |
| Democratic hold | | | |

11th District (Wayne County)
| Party | Candidate | Votes | % |
|---|---|---|---|
| Democratic | Stanley Stopczynski (incumbent) | 10,092 | 99.99 |
| Write-in | | 1 | 0.00 |
| Total votes | | 10,093 | 100.0 |
| Democratic hold | | | |

12th District (Wayne County)
| Party | Candidate | Votes | % |
|---|---|---|---|
| Democratic | Curtis Hertel (incumbent) | 9,239 | 79.97 |
| Republican | Douglas Allor | 2,083 | 18.02 |
| Workers World | David Sole | 229 | 1.98 |
| Write-in | | 2 | 0.01 |
| Total votes | | 11,553 | 100.0 |
| Democratic hold | | | |

13th District (Wayne County)
| Party | Candidate | Votes | % |
|---|---|---|---|
| Republican | William R. Bryant Jr. (incumbent) | 19,347 | 72.63 |
| Democratic | Shirley Pilette | 7,283 | 27.34 |
| Write-in | | 5 | 0.01 |
| Total votes | | 26,635 | 100.0 |
| Republican hold | | | |

14th District (Wayne County)
| Party | Candidate | Votes | % |
|---|---|---|---|
| Democratic | Joe Young Sr. (incumbent) | 8,070 | 89.18 |
| Republican | M. Hurd | 702 | 7.75 |
| Independent | William Tinsley | 277 | 3.06 |
| Total votes | | 9,049 | 100.0 |
| Democratic hold | | | |

15th District (Wayne County)
| Party | Candidate | Votes | % |
|---|---|---|---|
| Democratic | Joe Young Jr. (incumbent) | 7,990 | 96.04 |
| Republican | Jacquelynn Rodgers | 329 | 3.95 |
| Total votes | | 8,319 | 100.0 |
| Democratic hold | | | |

16th District (Wayne County)
| Party | Candidate | Votes | % |
|---|---|---|---|
| Democratic | Hansen Clarke | 8,932 | 91.98 |
| Republican | Linda Scarberry | 778 | 8.01 |
| Total votes | | 9,710 | 100.0 |
| Democratic hold | | | |

17th District (Wayne County)
| Party | Candidate | Votes | % |
|---|---|---|---|
| Democratic | Raymond M. Murphy (incumbent) | 6,757 | 88.30 |
| Republican | Dorothy Patterson | 735 | 9.60 |
| Workers World | Emma Curry | 159 | 2.07 |
| Write-in | | 1 | 0.01 |
| Total votes | | 7,652 | 100.0 |
| Democratic hold | | | |

18th District (Clare County, Lake County, Missaukee County, Osceola County, Wexford County)
| Party | Candidate | Votes | % |
|---|---|---|---|
| Republican | Sid Ouwinga (incumbent) | 17,936 | 65.19 |
| Democratic | Laura Berger | 9,577 | 34.80 |
| Total votes | | 27,513 | 100.0 |
| Democratic hold | | | |

19th District (Montcalm County, Newaygo County)
| Party | Candidate | Votes | % |
|---|---|---|---|
| Republican | Donald Van Singel (incumbent) | 15,672 | 66.39 |
| Democratic | Errol Kangas | 7,931 | 33.60 |
| Total votes | | 23,603 | 100.0 |
| Republican hold | | | |

20th District (Oakland County)
| Party | Candidate | Votes | % |
|---|---|---|---|
| Republican | Claude Trim (incumbent) | 16,610 | 68.86 |
| Democratic | Ronald Bowman | 7,509 | 31.13 |
| Write-in | | 2 | 0.00 |
| Total votes | | 24,121 | 100.0 |
| Republican hold | | | |

21st District (Monroe County, Wayne County)
| Party | Candidate | Votes | % |
|---|---|---|---|
| Democratic | Lynn Owen (incumbent) | 9,456 | 55.30 |
| Republican | James Schmitz | 7,643 | 44.69 |
| Write-in | | 0 | 0.00 |
| Total votes | | 17,099 | 100.0 |
| Democratic hold | | | |

22nd District (Washtenaw County)
| Party | Candidate | Votes | % |
|---|---|---|---|
| Democratic | Kirk Profit (incumbent) | 14,326 | 99.91 |
| Write-in | | 12 | 0.08 |
| Total votes | | 14,338 | 100.0 |
| Democratic hold | | | |

23rd District (Ingham County, Jackson County)
| Party | Candidate | Votes | % |
|---|---|---|---|
| Republican | Philip Hoffman (incumbent) | 15,084 | 100.0 |
| Total votes | | 15,084 | 100.0 |
| Republican hold | | | |

24th District (Oakland County)
| Party | Candidate | Votes | % |
|---|---|---|---|
| Republican | Barbara Dobb | 17,553 | 60.47 |
| Democratic | Marcia Fligman | 9,175 | 31.60 |
| Write-In | Debbie Schlussel (Note: In the August primary election, Barbara Dobb won the Republican nomination over Debbie Schlussel by one vote. A September recount affirmed Dobb's victory. Schlussel challenged the recount in court, claiming it was done improperly by the county board of canvassers. The circuit court ruled against her in October.) | 2,290 | 7.88 |
| Write-in | | 8 | 0.02 |
| Total votes | | 29,026 | 100.0 |
| Republican hold | | | |

25th District (Macomb County)
| Party | Candidate | Votes | % |
|---|---|---|---|
| Democratic | Dennis Olshove | 14,747 | 51.16 |
| Republican | D. Roman Kulchitsky (incumbent) | 13,803 | 47.88 |
| Libertarian | Ronald Burcham | 274 | 0.95 |
| Total votes | | 28,824 | 100.0 |
| Democratic gain from Republican | | | |

26th District (Macomb County)
| Party | Candidate | Votes | % |
|---|---|---|---|
| Republican | David Jaye (incumbent) | 16,688 | 53.15 |
| Democratic | Bill Browne | 13,632 | 43.42 |
| Libertarian | Dave Weidner | 1,072 | 3.41 |
| Write-in | | 2 | 0.00 |
| Total votes | | 31,394 | 100.0 |
| Republican hold | | | |

27th District (Wayne County)
| Party | Candidate | Votes | % |
|---|---|---|---|
| Democratic | Vincent Porreca (incumbent) | 13,860 | 57.89 |
| Republican | Michael Reidy | 9,699 | 40.51 |
| Libertarian | Mary Long | 378 | 1.57 |
| Write-in | | 3 | 0.01 |
| Total votes | | 23,940 | 100.0 |
| Democratic hold | | | |

28th District (Wayne County)
| Party | Candidate | Votes | % |
|---|---|---|---|
| Democratic | Robert DeMars (incumbent) | 13,346 | 79.29 |
| Republican | Dennis Harrison | 3,484 | 20.69 |
| Write-in | | 1 | 0.00 |
| Total votes | | 16,831 | 100.0 |
| Democratic hold | | | |

29th District (Wayne County)
| Party | Candidate | Votes | % |
|---|---|---|---|
| Democratic | Gregory Pitoniak (incumbent) | 8,788 | 70.75 |
| Republican | David Mortensen | 3,633 | 29.24 |
| Total votes | | 12,421 | 100.0 |
| Democratic hold | | | |

30th District (Wayne County)
| Party | Candidate | Votes | % |
|---|---|---|---|
| Democratic | Joseph Palamara (incumbent) | 16,295 | 74.06 |
| Republican | Slayter Miller | 5,706 | 25.93 |
| Total votes | | 22,001 | 100.0 |
| Democratic hold | | | |

31st District (Wayne County)
| Party | Candidate | Votes | % |
|---|---|---|---|
| Democratic | Agnes Dobronski (incumbent) | 15,763 | 50.73 |
| Republican | Gayle Thomas | 14,445 | 46.49 |
| Libertarian | Kay Coriaty | 803 | 2.58 |
| Write-in | | 56 | 0.18 |
| Total votes | | 31,067 | 100.0 |
| Democratic gain from Republican | | | |

32nd District (Wayne County)
| Party | Candidate | Votes | % |
|---|---|---|---|
| Democratic | Richard Young (incumbent) | 14,807 | 63.93 |
| Republican | James Carey | 8,354 | 36.06 |
| Total votes | | 23,161 | 100.0 |
| Democratic hold | | | |

33rd District (Wayne County)
| Party | Candidate | Votes | % |
|---|---|---|---|
| Democratic | William R. Keith (incumbent) | 9,849 | 71.01 |
| Republican | Donald Mullett | 4,019 | 28.98 |
| Total votes | | 13,868 | 100.0 |
| Democratic hold | | | |

34th District (Wayne County)
| Party | Candidate | Votes | % |
|---|---|---|---|
| Democratic | John Bennett (incumbent) | 14,882 | 65.14 |
| Republican | Mark Steinhauer | 7,963 | 34.85 |
| Total votes | | 22,845 | 100.0 |
| Democratic hold | | | |

35th District (Wayne County)
| Party | Candidate | Votes | % |
|---|---|---|---|
| Republican | Lyn Bankes (incumbent) | 18,534 | 68.95 |
| Democratic | R. Burnett | 8,340 | 31.02 |
| Write-in | | 5 | 0.01 |
| Total votes | | 26,879 | 100.0 |
| Republican hold | | | |

36th District (Wayne County)
| Party | Candidate | Votes | % |
|---|---|---|---|
| Republican | Gerald Law (incumbent) | 18,594 | 69.62 |
| Democratic | Dennis Shrewsbury | 8,112 | 30.37 |
| Total votes | | 26,706 | 100.0 |
| Republican hold | | | |

37th District (Wayne County)
| Party | Candidate | Votes | % |
|---|---|---|---|
| Democratic | Jim Kosteva (incumbent) | 10,110 | 60.91 |
| Republican | Dolores Carmichael | 6,486 | 39.08 |
| Total votes | | 16,596 | 100.0 |
| Democratic hold | | | |

38th District (Wayne County)
| Party | Candidate | Votes | % |
|---|---|---|---|
| Democratic | Justine Barns (incumbent) | 10,712 | 65.84 |
| Republican | Kenneth Raupp | 5,553 | 34.13 |
| Write-in | | 3 | 0.01 |
| Total votes | | 16,268 | 100.0 |
| Democratic hold | | | |

39th District (Monroe County)
| Party | Candidate | Votes | % |
|---|---|---|---|
| Democratic | Jerry Bartnik (incumbent) | 12,292 | 67.34 |
| Republican | George Versteeg | 5,961 | 32.65 |
| Total votes | | 18,253 | 100.0 |
| Democratic hold | | | |

40th District (Lenawee County)
| Party | Candidate | Votes | % |
|---|---|---|---|
| Republican | Tim Walberg (incumbent) | 14,018 | 57.15 |
| Democratic | Paul Hill | 10,504 | 42.82 |
| Write-in | | 4 | 0.01 |
| Total votes | | 24,526 | 100.0 |
| Republican hold | | | |

41st District (Branch County, Hillsdale County)
| Party | Candidate | Votes | % |
|---|---|---|---|
| Republican | Michael Nye (incumbent) | 13,909 | 70.48 |
| Democratic | Gregory Zelenock | 5,824 | 29.51 |
| Write-in | | 1 | 0.00 |
| Total votes | | 19,734 | 100.0 |
| Republican hold | | | |

42nd District (Cass County, St. Joseph County)
| Party | Candidate | Votes | % |
|---|---|---|---|
| Republican | Glenn Oxender (incumbent) | 14,018 | 67.55 |
| Democratic | Burke Webb | 6,733 | 32.44 |
| Total votes | | 20,751 | 100.0 |
| Republican hold | | | |

43rd District (Berrien County)
| Party | Candidate | Votes | % |
|---|---|---|---|
| Republican | Carl Gnodtke (incumbent) | 12,240 | 63.87 |
| Democratic | Joseph Strotter | 6,919 | 36.10 |
| Write-in | | 2 | 0.01 |
| Total votes | | 19,161 | 100.0 |
| Republican hold | | | |

44th District (Berrien County)
| Party | Candidate | Votes | % |
|---|---|---|---|
| Republican | Robert Brackenridge | 10,916 | 60.52 |
| Democratic | Jerry Sirk | 7,115 | 39.45 |
| Write-in | | 4 | 0.02 |
| Total votes | | 18,035 | 100.0 |
| Republican hold | | | |

45th District (Cass County, Van Buren County)
| Party | Candidate | Votes | % |
|---|---|---|---|
| Republican | James Middaugh (incumbent) | 12,827 | 66.33 |
| Democratic | Michael Duffy | 6,508 | 33.65 |
| Write-in | | 1 | 0.00 |
| Total votes | | 19,336 | 100.0 |
| Republican hold | | | |

46th District (Kalamazoo County)
| Party | Candidate | Votes | % |
|---|---|---|---|
| Democratic | Mary Brown (incumbent) | 11,592 | 60.36 |
| Republican | Timothy Goodrich | 7,610 | 39.63 |
| Total votes | | 19,202 | 100.0 |
| Republican hold | | | |

47th District (Kalamazoo County)
| Party | Candidate | Votes | % |
|---|---|---|---|
| Republican | Dale Shugars | 19,796 | 66.85 |
| Democratic | Edward Verity | 9,814 | 33.14 |
| Total votes | | 29,610 | 100.0 |
| Republican hold | | | |

48th District (Calhoun County, Kalamazoo County)
| Party | Candidate | Votes | % |
|---|---|---|---|
| Republican | Donald Gilmer (incumbent) | 12,144 | 58.31 |
| Democratic | Marty McDermott | 8,681 | 41.68 |
| Total votes | | 20,825 | 100.0 |
| Republican hold | | | |

49th District (Calhoun County)
| Party | Candidate | Votes | % |
|---|---|---|---|
| Republican | Bill Martin (incumbent) | 17,868 | 69.83 |
| Democratic | Fred Harris | 7,717 | 30.16 |
| Write-in | | 1 | 0.00 |
| Total votes | | 25,586 | 100.0 |
| Republican hold | | | |

50th District (Jackson County)
| Party | Candidate | Votes | % |
|---|---|---|---|
| Democratic | Michael Griffin (incumbent) | 13,686 | 99.97 |
| Write-in | | 3 | 0.02 |
| Total votes | | 13,689 | 100.0 |
| Democratic hold | | | |

51st District (Livingston County)
| Party | Candidate | Votes | % |
|---|---|---|---|
| Republican | Susan Munsell (incumbent) | 19,512 | 65.57 |
| Democratic | Patrick Blake | 10,241 | 34.42 |
| Total votes | | 29,753 | 100.0 |
| Republican hold | | | |

52nd District (Washtenaw County)
| Party | Candidate | Votes | % |
|---|---|---|---|
| Republican | Margaret O'Connor (incumbent) | 15,119 | 50.06 |
| Democratic | James Douglas | 15,079 | 49.93 |
| Write-in | | 2 | 0.00 |
| Total votes | | 30,200 | 100.0 |
| Republican hold | | | |

53rd District (Washtenaw County)
| Party | Candidate | Votes | % |
|---|---|---|---|
| Democratic | Perry Bullard (incumbent) | 16,992 | 67.74 |
| Republican | Steve Carey | 8,086 | 32.23 |
| Write-in | | 5 | 0.01 |
| Total votes | | 25,083 | 100.0 |
| Democratic hold | | | |

54th District (Allegan County, Barry County)
| Party | Candidate | Votes | % |
|---|---|---|---|
| Republican | Paul Hillegonds (incumbent) | 18,159 | 71.89 |
| Democratic | Kenneth Pardee | 7,095 | 28.09 |
| Write-in | | 2 | 0.00 |
| Total votes | | 25,256 | 100.0 |
| Republican hold | | | |

55th District (Ottawa County)
| Party | Candidate | Votes | % |
|---|---|---|---|
| Republican | Jessie Dalman | 24,338 | 83.19 |
| Democratic | Joel Zophy | 4,913 | 16.79 |
| Write-in | | 4 | 0.01 |
| Total votes | | 29,255 | 100.0 |
| Republican hold | | | |

56th District (Eaton County)
| Party | Candidate | Votes | % |
|---|---|---|---|
| Republican | Frank M. Fitzgerald (incumbent) | 19,666 | 66.90 |
| Democratic | Lisa Chappell | 9,729 | 33.09 |
| Total votes | | 29,395 | 100.0 |
| Republican hold | | | |

57th District (Ingham County)
| Party | Candidate | Votes | % |
|---|---|---|---|
| Democratic | David Hollister (incumbent) | 15,438 | 63.05 |
| Republican | Carol McKowen | 7,547 | 30.82 |
| Libertarian | Jon Addiss | 872 | 3.56 |
| Tisch Independent | Raymond Myers | 621 | 2.53 |
| Write-in | | 7 | 0.02 |
| Total votes | | 24,485 | 100.0 |
| Republican hold | | | |

58th District (Ingham County)
| Party | Candidate | Votes | % |
|---|---|---|---|
| Democratic | Dianne Byrum | 14,920 | 53.65 |
| Republican | Jerry Mills | 12,383 | 44.52 |
| Libertarian | Dale Dobberstein | 506 | 1.81 |
| Total votes | | 27,809 | 100.0 |
| Democratic hold | | | |

59th District (Ingham County)
| Party | Candidate | Votes | % |
|---|---|---|---|
| Democratic | H. Lynn Jondahl (incumbent) | 17,853 | 61.75 |
| Republican | Frank Strother | 10,097 | 34.92 |
| Libertarian | Michael Miller | 959 | 3.31 |
| Write-in | | 1 | 0.00 |
| Total votes | | 28,910 | 100.0 |
| Democratic hold | | | |

60th District (Oakland County)
| Party | Candidate | Votes | % |
|---|---|---|---|
| Republican | Bill Bullard Jr. (incumbent) | 16,616 | 65.12 |
| Democratic | Robert Taub | 8,217 | 32.20 |
| Libertarian | Scott Scarborough | 678 | 2.65 |
| Write-in | | 4 | 0.01 |
| Total votes | | 25,515 | 100.0 |
| Republican hold | | | |

61st District (Oakland County)
| Party | Candidate | Votes | % |
|---|---|---|---|
| Republican | Tom F. Middleton | 19,618 | 74.43 |
| Democratic | Frederick Miller | 6,733 | 25.54 |
| Write-in | | 5 | 0.01 |
| Total votes | | 26,356 | 100.0 |
| Republican hold | | | |

62nd District (Oakland County)
| Party | Candidate | Votes | % |
|---|---|---|---|
| Democratic | Charlie Harrison Jr. (incumbent) | 8,493 | 74.22 |
| Republican | Douglas Thornton | 2,948 | 25.76 |
| Write-in | | 1 | 0.00 |
| Total votes | | 11,442 | 100.0 |
| Democratic hold | | | |

63rd District (Oakland County)
| Party | Candidate | Votes | % |
|---|---|---|---|
| Republican | Gordon Sparks (incumbent) | 25,042 | 72.54 |
| Democratic | John Buller | 9,476 | 27.45 |
| Write-in | | 1 | 0.00 |
| Total votes | | 34,519 | 100.0 |
| Republican hold | | | |

64th District (Oakland County)
| Party | Candidate | Votes | % |
|---|---|---|---|
| Democratic | Maxine Berman (incumbent) | 18,145 | 75.49 |
| Republican | Ben Mayer | 5,889 | 24.50 |
| Write-in | | 1 | 0.00 |
| Total votes | | 24,035 | 100.0 |
| Democratic hold | | | |

65th District (Oakland County)
| Party | Candidate | Votes | % |
|---|---|---|---|
| Republican | Mike Bouchard | 20,962 | 73.44 |
| Democratic | Cheryl Sugerman | 7,579 | 26.55 |
| Write-in | | 2 | 0.00 |
| Total votes | | 28,543 | 100.0 |
| Republican hold | | | |

66th District (Oakland County)
| Party | Candidate | Votes | % |
|---|---|---|---|
| Democratic | Wilfred D. Webb (incumbent) | 12,456 | 63.91 |
| Republican | Howard Johnson | 7,032 | 36.08 |
| Total votes | | 19,488 | 100.0 |
| Democratic hold | | | |

67th District (Oakland County)
| Party | Candidate | Votes | % |
|---|---|---|---|
| Democratic | David Gubow (incumbent) | 16,434 | 74.15 |
| Republican | Fred Collins | 5,723 | 25.82 |
| Write-in | | 4 | 0.01 |
| Total votes | | 22,161 | 100.0 |
| Democratic hold | | | |

68th District (Oakland County)
| Party | Candidate | Votes | % |
|---|---|---|---|
| Republican | Shirley Johnson (incumbent) | 18,058 | 66.54 |
| Democratic | Lynn Roberts | 8,206 | 30.24 |
| Independent | Curtis Jenkins | 870 | 3.20 |
| Write-in | | 1 | 0.00 |
| Total votes | | 27,135 | 100.0 |
| Republican hold | | | |

69th District (Oakland County)
| Party | Candidate | Votes | % |
|---|---|---|---|
| Republican | Jan C. Dolan (incumbent) | 24,331 | 72.00 |
| Democratic | Barry Brickner | 9,456 | 27.98 |
| Write-in | | 3 | 0.00 |
| Total votes | | 33,790 | 100.0 |
| Republican hold | | | |

70th District (Macomb County)
| Party | Candidate | Votes | % |
|---|---|---|---|
| Democratic | Lloyd F. Weeks (incumbent) | 11,935 | 70.51 |
| Republican | Janet Trombka | 4,991 | 29.48 |
| Total votes | | 16,926 | 100.0 |
| Democratic hold | | | |

71st District (Macomb County)
| Party | Candidate | Votes | % |
|---|---|---|---|
| Democratic | Sal Rocca (incumbent) | 18,988 | 70.59 |
| Republican | Dennis Burin | 7,383 | 27.44 |
| Libertarian | I. Gravlin | 527 | 1.95 |
| Total votes | | 26,898 | 100.0 |
| Democratic hold | | | |

72nd District (Macomb County)
| Party | Candidate | Votes | % |
|---|---|---|---|
| Democratic | Sharon Gire (incumbent) | 17,590 | 64.65 |
| Republican | Mary Fitch | 8,847 | 32.52 |
| Libertarian | Ruby Zornik | 766 | 2.81 |
| Write-in | | 1 | 0.00 |
| Total votes | | 27,204 | 100.0 |
| Democratic hold | | | |

73rd District (Macomb County)
| Party | Candidate | Votes | % |
|---|---|---|---|
| Democratic | Nick Ciaramitaro (incumbent) | 14,271 | 70.86 |
| Republican | R. Bedra | 5,268 | 26.16 |
| Libertarian | Paul Kaiser | 597 | 2.96 |
| Write-in | | 1 | 0.00 |
| Total votes | | 20,137 | 100.0 |
| Democratic hold | | | |

74th District (Macomb County)
| Party | Candidate | Votes | % |
|---|---|---|---|
| Democratic | Tracey Yokich | 13,550 | 52.24 |
| Republican | Bob MacDonald | 11,647 | 44.90 |
| Libertarian | Keith Edwards | 739 | 2.84 |
| Total votes | | 25,936 | 100.0 |
| Democratic hold | | | |

75th District (Macomb County)
| Party | Candidate | Votes | % |
|---|---|---|---|
| Democratic | Kenneth DeBeaussaert (incumbent) | 15,980 | 64.89 |
| Republican | Steven Zinner | 8,646 | 35.10 |
| Total votes | | 24,626 | 100.0 |
| Democratic hold | | | |

76th District (St. Clair County)
| Party | Candidate | Votes | % |
|---|---|---|---|
| Republican | Terry London (incumbent) | 13,328 | 50.55 |
| Democratic | James Docherty | 13,034 | 49.43 |
| Write-in | | 3 | 0.01 |
| Total votes | | 26,365 | 100.0 |
| Republican hold | | | |

77th District (Huron County, Tuscola County)
| Party | Candidate | Votes | % |
|---|---|---|---|
| Republican | Richard D. Allen (incumbent) | 13,911 | 61.08 |
| Democratic | John Neeb | 8,864 | 38.91 |
| Total votes | | 22,775 | 100.0 |
| Republican hold | | | |

78th District (St. Clair County, Sanilac County)
| Party | Candidate | Votes | % |
|---|---|---|---|
| Republican | Keith Muxlow (incumbent) | 15,818 | 65.13 |
| Democratic | Robert Dombroski | 8,466 | 34.86 |
| Total votes | | 24,284 | 100.0 |
| Republican hold | | | |

79th District (Genesee County)
| Party | Candidate | Votes | % |
|---|---|---|---|
| Democratic | Nate Jonker (incumbent) | 18,606 | 99.90 |
| Write-in | | 18 | 0.09 |
| Total votes | | 18,624 | 100.0 |
| Democratic hold | | | |

80th District (Genesee County)
| Party | Candidate | Votes | % |
|---|---|---|---|
| Democratic | Floyd Clack (incumbent) | 13,236 | 99.99 |
| Write-in | | 1 | 0.00 |
| Total votes | | 13,237 | 100.0 |
| Democratic hold | | | |

81st District (Genesee County)
| Party | Candidate | Votes | % |
|---|---|---|---|
| Democratic | Robert L. Emerson (incumbent) | 17,835 | 99.94 |
| Write-in | | 9 | 0.05 |
| Total votes | | 17,844 | 100.0 |
| Democratic hold | | | |

82nd District (Genesee County)
| Party | Candidate | Votes | % |
|---|---|---|---|
| Democratic | Thomas Scott (incumbent) | 14,470 | 63.01 |
| Republican | Pat Connors | 8,494 | 36.98 |
| Total votes | | 22,964 | 100.0 |
| Democratic hold | | | |

83rd District (Genesee County)
| Party | Candidate | Votes | % |
|---|---|---|---|
| Republican | David B. Robertson | 16,147 | 52.04 |
| Democratic | Kay Hart (incumbent) | 14,876 | 47.94 |
| Write-in | | 1 | 0.00 |
| Total votes | | 31,024 | 100.0 |
| Republican gain from Democratic | | | |

84th District (Lapeer County, Tuscola County)
| Party | Candidate | Votes | % |
|---|---|---|---|
| Republican | John Strand (incumbent) | 13,919 | 63.05 |
| Democratic | Jeff Fulton | 8,155 | 36.94 |
| Total votes | | 22,074 | 100.0 |
| Republican hold | | | |

85th District (Saginaw County)
| Party | Candidate | Votes | % |
|---|---|---|---|
| Democratic | James E. O'Neill Jr. (incumbent) | 14,506 | 78.80 |
| Republican | Darryl Newman | 3,901 | 21.19 |
| Total votes | | 18,407 | 100.0 |
| Democratic hold | | | |

86th District (Bay County, Saginaw County)
| Party | Candidate | Votes | % |
|---|---|---|---|
| Democratic | Lewis N. Dodak (incumbent) | 17,172 | 71.93 |
| Republican | Lorraine Corl | 6,695 | 28.04 |
| Write-in | | 3 | 0.01 |
| Total votes | | 23,870 | 100.0 |
| Democratic hold | | | |

87th District (Livingston County, Shiawassee County)
| Party | Candidate | Votes | % |
|---|---|---|---|
| Democratic | Clark Harder | 13,816 | 57.57 |
| Republican | Jim Civille | 9,812 | 40.88 |
| Write-In | Michael J. McCloskey | 363 | 1.51 |
| Write-in | | 6 | 0.02 |
| Total votes | | 23,997 | 100.0 |
| Democratic hold | | | |

88th District (Barry County, Ionia County)
| Party | Candidate | Votes | % |
|---|---|---|---|
| Republican | Robert Bender (incumbent) | 16,537 | 65.07 |
| Democratic | Mark Doster | 8,870 | 34.90 |
| Write-in | | 5 | 0.01 |
| Total votes | | 25,412 | 100.0 |
| Republican hold | | | |

89th District (Clinton County, Gratiot County)
| Party | Candidate | Votes | % |
|---|---|---|---|
| Republican | Gary L. Randall (incumbent) | 17,445 | 65.88 |
| Democratic | Sharron Jones | 9,029 | 34.10 |
| Write-in | | 2 | 0.00 |
| Total votes | | 26,476 | 100.0 |
| Republican hold | | | |

90th District (Kent County)
| Party | Candidate | Votes | % |
|---|---|---|---|
| Republican | Jack Horton | 18,288 | 63.58 |
| Democratic | Carl Redding | 10,471 | 36.40 |
| Write-in | | 4 | 0.01 |
| Total votes | | 28,763 | 100.0 |
| Republican hold | | | |

91st District (Kent County)
| Party | Candidate | Votes | % |
|---|---|---|---|
| Republican | Walter DeLange (incumbent) | 26,483 | 74.54 |
| Democratic | John Nuerenberg | 9,042 | 25.45 |
| Write-in | | 1 | 0.00 |
| Total votes | | 35,526 | 100.0 |
| Republican hold | | | |

92nd District (Kent County)
| Party | Candidate | Votes | % |
|---|---|---|---|
| Democratic | Thomas Mathieu (incumbent) | 16,780 | 63.35 |
| Republican | Mary Milanowksi | 9,704 | 36.63 |
| Write-in | | 1 | 0.00 |
| Total votes | | 26,485 | 100.0 |
| Democratic hold | | | |

93rd District (Kent County)
| Party | Candidate | Votes | % |
|---|---|---|---|
| Republican | Richard Bandstra (incumbent) | 15,093 | 62.39 |
| Democratic | Michael Reagan | 9,097 | 37.60 |
| Total votes | | 24,190 | 100.0 |
| Republican hold | | | |

94th District (Kent County)
| Party | Candidate | Votes | % |
|---|---|---|---|
| Republican | Ken Sikkema (incumbent) | 20,132 | 71.17 |
| Democratic | Stan Ponstein | 8,152 | 28.81 |
| Write-in | | 2 | 0.00 |
| Total votes | | 28,286 | 100.0 |
| Republican hold | | | |

95th District (Ottawa County)
| Party | Candidate | Votes | % |
|---|---|---|---|
| Republican | Alvin Hoekman (incumbent) | 19,411 | 71.72 |
| Democratic | Bill Kishkorn | 7,651 | 28.27 |
| Write-in | | 1 | 0.00 |
| Total votes | | 27,063 | 100.0 |
| Republican hold | | | |

96th District (Muskegon County)
| Party | Candidate | Votes | % |
|---|---|---|---|
| Republican | M. L. Mickey Knight (incumbent) | 12,876 | 63.45 |
| Democratic | Chuck Modd | 7,415 | 36.54 |
| Write-in | | 1 | 0.00 |
| Total votes | | 20,292 | 100.0 |
| Republican hold | | | |

97th District (Muskegon County)
| Party | Candidate | Votes | % |
|---|---|---|---|
| Democratic | Paul Baade | 12,341 | 55.04 |
| Republican | Nancy L. Crandall (incumbent) | 10,080 | 44.95 |
| Total votes | | 22,421 | 100.0 |
| Democratic gain from Republican | | | |

98th District (Benzie County, Manistee County, Mason County, Oceana County)
| Party | Candidate | Votes | % |
|---|---|---|---|
| Republican | Bill Bobier | 15,119 | 55.22 |
| Democratic | Allan O'Shea | 12,252 | 44.75 |
| Write-in | | 4 | 0.01 |
| Total votes | | 27,375 | 100.0 |
| Republican hold | | | |

99th District (Isabella County, Mecosta County)
| Party | Candidate | Votes | % |
|---|---|---|---|
| Republican | Jim McBryde | 12,012 | 53.78 |
| Democratic | Kurt Fisher | 10,311 | 46.17 |
| Write-in | | 9 | 0.04 |
| Total votes | | 22,332 | 100.0 |
| Republican hold | | | |

100th District (Saginaw County)
| Party | Candidate | Votes | % |
|---|---|---|---|
| Democratic | Roland Niederstadt (incumbent) | 18,530 | 60.72 |
| Republican | Michael Goschka | 11,986 | 39.27 |
| Total votes | | 30,516 | 100.0 |
| Democratic hold | | | |

101st District (Bay County)
| Party | Candidate | Votes | % |
|---|---|---|---|
| Democratic | Thomas L. Hickner (incumbent) | 19,021 | 77.49 |
| Republican | Kevin Gresens | 5,520 | 22.48 |
| Write-in | | 4 | 0.01 |
| Total votes | | 24,545 | 100.0 |
| Democratic hold | | | |

102nd District (Gratiot County, Midland County)
| Party | Candidate | Votes | % |
|---|---|---|---|
| Republican | James R. McNutt | 18,492 | 68.83 |
| Democratic | Thomas Dauer | 8,371 | 31.15 |
| Write-in | | 2 | 0.00 |
| Total votes | | 26,865 | 100.0 |
| Republican hold | | | |

103rd District (Antrim County, Charlevoix County, Crawford County, Oscoda County, Otsego County, Roscommon County)
| Party | Candidate | Votes | % |
|---|---|---|---|
| Republican | Ralph Ostling (incumbent) | 17,086 | 56.21 |
| Democratic | Ellen Addington | 13,309 | 43.78 |
| Total votes | | 30,395 | 100.0 |
| Republican hold | | | |

104th District (Grand Traverse County, Kalkaska County Leelanau County)
| Party | Candidate | Votes | % |
|---|---|---|---|
| Republican | Thomas G. Power (incumbent) | 21,227 | 74.23 |
| Democratic | Thomas Reay | 7,367 | 25.76 |
| Write-in | | 1 | 0.00 |
| Total votes | | 28,595 | 100.0 |
| Republican hold | | | |

105th District (Arenac County, Gladwin County, Iosco County, Ogemaw County)
| Party | Candidate | Votes | % |
|---|---|---|---|
| Democratic | Thomas Alley (incumbent) | 18,793 | 99.88 |
| Write-in | | 22 | 0.11 |
| Total votes | | 18,815 | 100.0 |
| Democratic hold | | | |

106th District (Alcona County, Alpena County, Cheboygan County, Montmorency County, Presque Isle County)
| Party | Candidate | Votes | % |
|---|---|---|---|
| Republican | Beverly A. Bodem | 14,825 | 95.00 |
| Write-In | B. Brady | 761 | 4.87 |
| Write-in | | 18 | 0.11 |
| Total votes | | 15,604 | 100.0 |
| Republican hold | | | |

107th District (Alger County, Chippewa County, Emmet County, Luce County, Mackinac County, Schoolcraft County)
| Party | Candidate | Votes | % |
|---|---|---|---|
| Democratic | Pat Gagliardi (incumbent) | 21,272 | 73.87 |
| Republican | H. Rae | 7,522 | 26.12 |
| Write-in | | 2 | 0.00 |
| Total votes | | 28,796 | 100.0 |
| Democratic hold | | | |

108th District (Baraga County, Marquette County)
| Party | Candidate | Votes | % |
|---|---|---|---|
| Democratic | Dominic Jacobetti (incumbent) | 16,293 | 80.52 |
| Republican | Steven Gust | 3,940 | 19.47 |
| Total votes | | 20,233 | 100.0 |
| Democratic hold | | | |

109th District (Delta County, Dickinson County, Menominee County)
| Party | Candidate | Votes | % |
|---|---|---|---|
| Democratic | David Anthony | 15,562 | 56.55 |
| Republican | Craig Woerpel | 11,949 | 43.42 |
| Write-in | | 4 | 0.01 |
| Total votes | | 27,515 | 100.0 |
| Democratic hold | | | |

110th District (Gogebic County, Houghton County, Iron County, Keweenaw County, Ontonagon County)
| Party | Candidate | Votes | % |
|---|---|---|---|
| Republican | Stephen Dresch | 12,905 | 51.46 |
| Democratic | Richard A. Sofio (incumbent) | 12,168 | 48.52 |
| Write-in | | 2 | 0.00 |
| Total votes | | 25,075 | 100.0 |
| Republican gain from Democratic | | | |

== See also ==
- 1990 Michigan Senate election
