= 1986 Michigan House of Representatives election =

- November 4, 1986

All 110 seats in the Michigan House of Representatives 56 seats needed for a majority
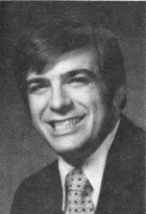

	Majority party	Minority party
Leader	Gary Owen	Michael Busch (retired)
Party	Democratic	Republican
Leader since	1983	1983
Leader's seat	22nd district	100th district
Last election	57	53
Seats after	64	46
Seat change	▲7	▼7
Popular vote	1,266,969	1,022,024
Percentage	55.24%	44.56%
Speaker before election
Gary Owen
Democratic
Elected Speaker
Gary Owen
Democratic

An election was held on November 4, 1986, to elect all 110 members of the Michigan House of Representatives for the 84th Michigan Legislature. In the election, the Democrats increased their membership, resulting in a 64–46 majority over the Republicans.

== History ==
In the 1984 general election, Democrats lost six seats to the Republicans, but retained a majority. After the election, Democrats had 57 members compared to 53 Republican members.

The 1986 primary election was held on August 5. There were only 33 contest primary races. Of the contests, 22 were seats where incumbents face re-election. The 11 open seats, where no incumbent sought re-election, all say contested primaries.

The general election was held on November 4. It saw the Democratic majority increase to 64–46. Democrats flipped nine seats, while Republicans flipped two. In the 26th district, Democrat Bill Browne and Republican David Jaye competed in an open seat, vacated by Republican Doug Carl. Browne won by a small margin, just 33 votes. In a December recount requested by Jaye, Browne's victory was upheld. Following the election, Gary Owen was re-elected state House speaker. Paul Hillegonds was selected by Republicans as minority leader.

The state House was sworn in on January 14, 1987.

== Results ==
The following are the official results from the 1987–1988 Michigan Manual.

=== Statewide ===
Party	Candi- dates	Votes		Seats		
Party	Candi- dates	No.	%	No.	+/–	%
Democratic Party	110	1,266,969	55.24%	64	▲7	55.45%
Republican Party	108	1,022,024	44.56%	46	▼7	44.54%
Tisch Independent Party	5	2,319	0.10%	0	Steady	0.00%
Independent	6	2,074	0.09%	0	Steady	0.00%
Write-ins		157	0.00%	0	Steady	0.00%
Total	229	2,293,543	100.00%	110	Steady	100.00%

=== By district ===
1st District (Wayne County)
Party	Candidate	Votes	%
Democratic	Michael J. Bennane (incumbent)	12,522	82.72
Republican	Shirley Vincent	2,614	17.27
Total votes		15,136	100.0
Democratic hold			

2nd District (Wayne County)
Party	Candidate	Votes	%
Democratic	Burton Leland (incumbent)	12,932	82.92
Republican	Dennis Polidori	2,663	17.07
Total votes		15,595	100.0
Democratic hold			

3rd District (Wayne County)
Party	Candidate	Votes	%
Democratic	Ilona Varga	9,775	80.59
Republican	Chester Calka	1,864	15.36
Independent	Samuel Webb	488	4.02
Write-in		1	0.00
Total votes		12,128	100.0
Democratic hold			

4th District (Wayne County)
Party	Candidate	Votes	%
Democratic	Alma G. Stallworth (incumbent)	18,339	94.04
Republican	JoAnn Roberts	1,161	5.95
Total votes		19,500	100.0
Democratic hold			

5th District (Wayne County)
Party	Candidate	Votes	%
Democratic	Teola Pearl Hunter (incumbent)	13,234	92.81
Republican	Jessie Johnson	1,024	7.18
Write-in		1	0.00
Total votes		14,259	100.0
Democratic hold			

6th District (Wayne County)
Party	Candidate	Votes	%
Democratic	Morris Hood Jr. (incumbent)	13,401	90.63
Republican	Stephanie Jackson	1,384	9.36
Total votes		14,785	100.0
Democratic hold			

7th District (Wayne County)
Party	Candidate	Votes	%
Democratic	Nelson Saunders (incumbent)	17,796	93.03
Republican	Dorothea Marshall	1,333	6.96
Total votes		19,129	100.0
Democratic hold			

8th District (Wayne County)
Party	Candidate	Votes	%
Democratic	Carolyn Cheeks Kilpatrick (incumbent)	14,934	95.66
Republican	Kirkland Blakely	675	4.32
Write-in		1	0.00
Total votes		15,610	100.0
Democratic hold			

9th District (Wayne County)
Party	Candidate	Votes	%
Democratic	Ethel Terrell (incumbent)	10,500	75.63
Republican	Kevin Hammons	3,382	24.36
Write-in		1	0.00
Total votes		13,883	100.0
Democratic hold			

10th District (Wayne County)
Party	Candidate	Votes	%
Democratic	Virgil C. Smith (incumbent)	13,737	89.22
Republican	David Leach	1,353	8.78
Independent	Freddie Kennedy	305	1.98
Write-in		1	0.00
Total votes		15,396	100.0
Democratic hold			

11th District (Wayne County)
Party	Candidate	Votes	%
Democratic	Stanley Stopczynski (incumbent)	13,525	86.43
Republican	Robert Pendergast	2,121	13.55
Write-in		2	0.01
Total votes		15,648	100.0
Democratic hold			

12th District (Wayne County)
Party	Candidate	Votes	%
Democratic	Curtis Hertel (incumbent)	12,280	99.98
Write-in		2	0.01
Total votes		12,282	100.0
Democratic hold			

13th District (Wayne County)
Party	Candidate	Votes	%
Republican	William R. Bryant Jr. (incumbent)	16,770	66.01
Democratic	Nancy Resowski	8,632	33.98
Write-in		1	0.00
Total votes		25,403	100.0
Republican hold			

14th District (Wayne County)
Party	Candidate	Votes	%
Democratic	Joe Young Sr. (incumbent)	11,596	90.22
Republican	Judy Askew	1,257	9.77
Total votes		12,853	100.0
Democratic hold			

15th District (Wayne County)
Party	Candidate	Votes	%
Democratic	Joe Young Jr. (incumbent)	11,362	94.13
Republican	Chester Williams	708	5.86
Total votes		12,070	100.0
Democratic hold			

16th District (Wayne County)
Party	Candidate	Votes	%
Democratic	Juanita Watkins (incumbent)	12,265	91.74
Republican	Bobby Brown	1,103	8.25
Total votes		13,368	100.0
Democratic hold			

17th District (Wayne County)
Party	Candidate	Votes	%
Democratic	Raymond M. Murphy (incumbent)	9,871	89.58
Republican	Dorothy Patterson	1,147	10.41
Total votes		11,018	100.0
Democratic hold			

18th District (Clare County, Lake County, Missaukee County, Osceola County, Wexford County)
Party	Candidate	Votes	%
Republican	Sid Ouwinga (incumbent)	17,801	67.01
Democratic	Mathias Forbes	8,761	32.98
Write-in		1	0.00
Total votes		26,563	100.0
Republican hold			

19th District (Montcalm County, Newaygo County)
Party	Candidate	Votes	%
Republican	Donald Van Singel (incumbent)	13,033	67.04
Democratic	Dan Reardon	6,406	32.95
Total votes		19,439	100.0
Republican hold			

20th District (Oakland County)
Party	Candidate	Votes	%
Republican	Claude Trim (incumbent)	14,675	66.27
Democratic	Dale Morris	7,466	33.71
Write-in		1	0.00
Total votes		22,142	100.0
Republican hold			

21st District (Monroe County, Wayne County)
Party	Candidate	Votes	%
Democratic	Lynn Owen (incumbent)	10,268	65.10
Republican	James Schmitz	5,504	34.89
Total votes		15,772	100.0
Democratic hold			

22nd District (Washtenaw County)
Party	Candidate	Votes	%
Democratic	Gary Owen (incumbent)	12,571	71.86
Republican	Steven Darr	4,922	28.13
Total votes		17,493	100.0
Democratic hold			

23rd District (Ingham County, Jackson County)
Party	Candidate	Votes	%
Republican	Philip Hoffman (incumbent)	11,980	66.08
Democratic	James Pedersen	6,149	33.91
Total votes		18,129	100.0
Republican hold			

24th District (Oakland County)
Party	Candidate	Votes	%
Republican	David Honigman (incumbent)	15,152	66.80
Democratic	Marsha Eisenberg	7,530	33.19
Total votes		22,682	100.0
Republican hold			

25th District (Macomb County)
Party	Candidate	Votes	%
Democratic	Dennis Dutko (incumbent)	15,954	61.04
Republican	Don Blevins	10,178	38.94
Write-in		1	0.00
Total votes		26,133	100.0
Democratic hold			

26th District (Macomb County)
Party	Candidate	Votes	%
Democratic	Bill Browne (Note: The official results in the Michigan Manual show Bill Browne having won 11,251 votes and David Jaye having won 11,218 votes. A recount in December showed Browne having won 11,261 and Jaye having won 11,223 votes.)	11,251	50.07
Republican	David Jaye	11,218	49.92
Write-in		1	0.00
Total votes		22,470	100.0
Democratic gain from Republican			

27th District (Wayne County)
Party	Candidate	Votes	%
Democratic	Vincent Porreca (incumbent)	15,607	70.04
Republican	Mel Kaplani	6,673	29.95
Total votes		22,280	100.0
Democratic hold			

28th District (Wayne County)
Party	Candidate	Votes	%
Democratic	Robert DeMars (incumbent)	15,599	84.84
Republican	William LeVan	2,786	15.15
Write-in		1	0.00
Total votes		18,386	100.0
Democratic hold			

29th District (Wayne County)
Party	Candidate	Votes	%
Democratic	Rick Sitz (incumbent)	9,709	78.48
Republican	Roger Paull	2,661	21.51
Total votes		12,370	100.0
Democratic hold			

30th District (Wayne County)
Party	Candidate	Votes	%
Democratic	Joseph Palamara (incumbent)	17,714	81.60
Republican	Lee Wenskay	3,991	18.38
Write-in		1	0.00
Total votes		21,706	100.0
Democratic hold			

31st District (Wayne County)
Party	Candidate	Votes	%
Democratic	Agnes Dobronski	16,558	50.66
Republican	Marjorie Powell	16,126	49.33
Total votes		32,684	100.0
Democratic gain from Republican			

32nd District (Wayne County)
Party	Candidate	Votes	%
Democratic	Richard Young (incumbent)	17,297	74.10
Republican	Ken Reese	6,045	25.89
Total votes		23,342	100.0
Democratic hold			

33rd District (Wayne County)
Party	Candidate	Votes	%
Democratic	William R. Keith (incumbent)	11,812	82.44
Republican	Edward Mellas	2,515	17.55
Total votes		14,327	100.0
Democratic hold			

34th District (Wayne County)
Party	Candidate	Votes	%
Democratic	John Bennett (incumbent)	14,775	62.86
Republican	Andy Anuzis	8,725	37.12
Write-in		1	0.00
Total votes		23,501	100.0
Democratic hold			

35th District (Wayne County)
Party	Candidate	Votes	%
Republican	Lyn Bankes (incumbent)	15,349	66.17
Democratic	Anthony Shannon Jr.	7,735	33.35
Write-in		109	0.46
Total votes		23,193	100.0
Republican hold			

36th District (Wayne County)
Party	Candidate	Votes	%
Republican	Gerald Law (incumbent)	14,702	66.12
Democratic	Kathy Rielly	7,531	33.87
Total votes		22,233	100.0
Republican hold			

37th District (Wayne County)
Party	Candidate	Votes	%
Democratic	Jim Kosteva (incumbent)	10,912	73.61
Republican	Theodore Jacques	3,912	26.38
Total votes		14,824	100.0
Democratic hold			

38th District (Wayne County)
Party	Candidate	Votes	%
Democratic	Justine Barns (incumbent)	10,770	67.82
Republican	George Erdei	5,109	32.17
Total votes		15,879	100.0
Democratic hold			

39th District (Monroe County)
Party	Candidate	Votes	%
Democratic	Jerry Bartnik (incumbent)	11,690	76.08
Republican	Peter Gillespie	3,674	23.91
Total votes		15,364	100.0
Democratic hold			

40th District (Lenawee County)
Party	Candidate	Votes	%
Republican	Tim Walberg (incumbent)	11,348	55.80
Democratic	Henry Crudder	8,986	44.18
Write-in		1	0.00
Total votes		20,335	100.0
Republican hold			

41st District (Branch County, Hillsdale County)
Party	Candidate	Votes	%
Republican	Michael Nye (incumbent)	13,751	72.16
Democratic	Robert VanArsdalen	5,304	27.83
Write-in		1	0.00
Total votes		19,056	100.0
Republican hold			

42nd District (Cass County, St. Joseph County)
Party	Candidate	Votes	%
Republican	Glenn Oxender (incumbent)	12,692	67.77
Democratic	Leah Brazo	6,036	32.22
Total votes		18,728	100.0
Republican hold			

43rd District (Berrien County)
Party	Candidate	Votes	%
Republican	Carl Gnodtke (incumbent)	12,886	71.42
Democratic	Forrest Perkins	5,156	28.57
Total votes		18,042	100.0
Republican hold			

44th District (Berrien County)
Party	Candidate	Votes	%
Republican	Lad Stacey (incumbent)	10,813	62.87
Democratic	James Boothby	6,385	37.12
Total votes		17,198	100.0
Republican hold			

45th District (Cass County, Van Buren County)
Party	Candidate	Votes	%
Republican	James Middaugh (incumbent)	12,166	67.43
Democratic	Timmy Montgomery	5,874	32.56
Total votes		18,040	100.0
Republican hold			

46th District (Kalamazoo County)
Party	Candidate	Votes	%
Democratic	Mary Brown (incumbent)	10,399	53.63
Republican	Randy Mason	8,987	46.35
Write-in		3	0.01
Total votes		19,389	100.0
Democratic hold			

47th District (Kalamazoo County)
Party	Candidate	Votes	%
Republican	Paul Wartner (incumbent)	16,537	67.82
Democratic	Michael Slaughter	7,845	32.17
Total votes		24,382	100.0
Republican hold			

48th District (Calhoun County, Kalamazoo County)
Party	Candidate	Votes	%
Republican	Donald Gilmer (incumbent)	12,252	62.65
Democratic	Martin McDermott	7,304	37.34
Total votes		19,556	100.0
Republican hold			

49th District (Calhoun County)
Party	Candidate	Votes	%
Republican	Bill Martin	13,452	54.42
Democratic	Ann Rosenbaum	11,006	44.53
Tisch Independent	Gar Dickerson	257	1.03
Total votes		24,715	100.0
Republican gain from Democratic			

50th District (Jackson County)
Party	Candidate	Votes	%
Democratic	Michael Griffin (incumbent)	13,619	73.41
Republican	Elmer Curl	4,932	26.58
Total votes		18,551	100.0
Democratic hold			

51st District (Livingston County)
Party	Candidate	Votes	%
Republican	Susan Munsell	12,988	51.92
Democratic	Cecelia Gee	10,867	43.44
Tisch Independent	James Tisch	1,158	4.62
Total votes		25,013	100.0
Republican hold			

52nd District (Washtenaw County)
Party	Candidate	Votes	%
Republican	Margaret O'Connor (incumbent)	12,833	51.72
Democratic	Donald Shelton	11,977	48.27
Total votes		24,810	100.0
Republican hold			

53rd District (Washtenaw County)
Party	Candidate	Votes	%
Democratic	Perry Bullard (incumbent)	16,535	65.90
Republican	Vic Holtz	8,554	34.09
Total votes		25,089	100.0
Democratic hold			

54th District (Allegan County, Barry County)
Party	Candidate	Votes	%
Republican	Paul Hillegonds (incumbent)	14,522	69.68
Democratic	Walter Garrett	6,316	30.31
Total votes		20,838	100.0
Republican hold			

55th District (Ottawa County)
Party	Candidate	Votes	%
Republican	William Van Regenmorter (incumbent)	19,110	80.73
Democratic	Dolores Hall	4,561	19.26
Total votes		23,671	100.0
Republican hold			

56th District (Eaton County)
Party	Candidate	Votes	%
Republican	Frank M. Fitzgerald	15,411	63.81
Democratic	Rosemary DiPonio	8,740	36.18
Total votes		24,151	100.0
Republican hold			

57th District (Ingham County)
Party	Candidate	Votes	%
Democratic	David Hollister (incumbent)	15,479	68.07
Republican	Richard Swanson	6,834	30.05
Tisch Independent	Raymond Myers	424	1.86
Write-in		1	0.00
Total votes		22,738	100.0
Democratic hold			

58th District (Ingham County)
Party	Candidate	Votes	%
Democratic	Debbie Stabenow (incumbent)	16,960	72.76
Republican	Bill Cady	5,830	25.01
Tisch Independent	Bob Petersen	336	1.44
Independent	Dale Dobberstein	182	0.78
Total votes		23,308	100.0
Democratic hold			

59th District (Ingham County)
Party	Candidate	Votes	%
Democratic	H. Lynn Jondahl (incumbent)	15,960	59.95
Republican	Wayne Wudyka	10,660	40.04
Write-in		1	0.00
Total votes		26,621	100.0
Democratic hold			

60th District (Oakland County)
Party	Candidate	Votes	%
Republican	Bill Bullard Jr. (incumbent)	12,692	65.30
Democratic	Marshall Spinner	6,743	34.69
Total votes		19,435	100.0
Republican hold			

61st District (Oakland County)
Party	Candidate	Votes	%
Republican	Mat J. Dunaskiss (incumbent)	15,063	71.75
Democratic	Greg Young	5,927	28.23
Write-in		1	0.00
Total votes		20,991	100.0
Republican hold			

62nd District (Oakland County)
Party	Candidate	Votes	%
Democratic	Charlie Harrison Jr. (incumbent)	9,743	77.69
Republican	Terri Adams	2,797	22.30
Total votes		12,540	100.0
Democratic hold			

63rd District (Oakland County)
Party	Candidate	Votes	%
Republican	Gordon Sparks (incumbent)	18,712	71.38
Democratic	Vicki Kremm	7,500	28.61
Write-in		2	0.00
Total votes		26,214	100.0
Republican hold			

64th District (Oakland County)
Party	Candidate	Votes	%
Democratic	Maxine Berman (incumbent)	18,060	73.63
Republican	Sheila Molnar	6,467	26.36
Total votes		24,527	100.0
Democratic hold			

65th District (Oakland County)
Party	Candidate	Votes	%
Republican	Judith Miller (incumbent)	19,093	76.58
Democratic	Joan Hill	5,835	23.40
Write-in		1	0.00
Total votes		24,929	100.0
Republican hold			

66th District (Oakland County)
Party	Candidate	Votes	%
Democratic	Wilfred D. Webb	10,757	55.82
Republican	Greg Gruse (incumbent)	8,512	44.17
Total votes		19,269	100.0
Democratic gain from Republican			

67th District (Oakland County)
Party	Candidate	Votes	%
Democratic	David Gubow (incumbent)	16,917	77.71
Republican	Lowell Ruppenthal	4,851	22.28
Total votes		21,768	100.0
Democratic hold			

68th District (Oakland County)
Party	Candidate	Votes	%
Republican	Shirley Johnson (incumbent)	16,920	66.74
Democratic	Donald Morse	8,432	33.25
Total votes		25,352	100.0
Republican hold			

69th District (Oakland County)
Party	Candidate	Votes	%
Republican	Wilbur Brotherton (incumbent)	19,114	72.05
Democratic	Michael Breshgold	7,414	27.94
Total votes		26,528	100.0
Republican hold			

70th District (Macomb County)
Party	Candidate	Votes	%
Democratic	Lloyd F. Weeks (incumbent)	14,233	99.97
Write-in		3	0.02
Total votes		14,236	100.0
Democratic hold			

71st District (Macomb County)
Party	Candidate	Votes	%
Democratic	Sal Rocca (incumbent)	16,651	71.45
Republican	Chester Rudnicki	6,653	28.54
Total votes		23,304	100.0
Democratic hold			

72nd District (Macomb County)
Party	Candidate	Votes	%
Democratic	Sharon Gire	12,459	56.46
Republican	Bob Perakis (incumbent)	9,607	43.53
Total votes		22,066	100.0
Democratic gain from Republican			

73rd District (Macomb County)
Party	Candidate	Votes	%
Democratic	Nick Ciaramitaro (incumbent)	15,673	78.98
Republican	Joseph Steinmetz	4,169	21.01
Total votes		19,842	100.0
Democratic hold			

74th District (Macomb County)
Party	Candidate	Votes	%
Democratic	John Maynard (incumbent)	16,147	65.33
Republican	Michael Scoglietti	8,566	34.66
Write-in		1	0.00
Total votes		24,714	100.0
Democratic hold			

75th District (Macomb County)
Party	Candidate	Votes	%
Democratic	Kenneth DeBeaussaert	11,810	56.75
Republican	George Furton (incumbent)	8,997	43.24
Total votes		20,807	100.0
Democratic gain from Republican			

76th District (St. Clair County)
Party	Candidate	Votes	%
Democratic	James Docherty	12,164	53.47
Republican	Terry London (incumbent)	10,583	46.52
Total votes		22,747	100.0
Democratic gain from Republican			

77th District (Huron County, Tuscola County)
Party	Candidate	Votes	%
Republican	Richard D. Allen (incumbent)	12,605	62.98
Democratic	Dick Erla	7,407	37.01
Total votes		20,012	100.0
Republican hold			

78th District (St. Clair County, Sanilac County)
Party	Candidate	Votes	%
Republican	Keith Muxlow (incumbent)	15,134	67.99
Democratic	Derwin Rushing	7,123	32.00
Total votes		22,257	100.0
Republican hold			

79th District (Genesee County)
Party	Candidate	Votes	%
Democratic	Nate Jonker	15,327	69.36
Republican	Bettye Lewis	6,770	30.63
Total votes		22,097	100.0
Democratic hold			

80th District (Genesee County)
Party	Candidate	Votes	%
Democratic	Floyd Clack (incumbent)	14,773	87.67
Republican	Anna Severson	2,077	12.32
Total votes		16,850	100.0
Democratic hold			

81st District (Genesee County)
Party	Candidate	Votes	%
Democratic	Robert L. Emerson (incumbent)	18,319	77.96
Republican	Jacqueline Coons	5,176	22.03
Total votes		23,495	100.0
Democratic hold			

82nd District (Genesee County)
Party	Candidate	Votes	%
Democratic	Thomas Scott (incumbent)	14,961	66.05
Republican	Dean Bagnall	7,688	33.94
Total votes		22,649	100.0
Democratic hold			

83rd District (Genesee County)
Party	Candidate	Votes	%
Democratic	Kay Hart	14,521	54.03
Republican	Charles Mueller (incumbent)	12,351	45.95
Write-in		2	0.00
Total votes		26,874	100.0
Democratic gain from Republican			

84th District (Lapeer County, Tuscola County)
Party	Candidate	Votes	%
Republican	John Strand (incumbent)	12,780	66.24
Democratic	Shelia Field	6,513	33.75
Total votes		19,293	100.0
Republican hold			

85th District (Saginaw County)
Party	Candidate	Votes	%
Democratic	James E. O'Neill Jr. (incumbent)	15,717	82.31
Republican	William Loveless	3,377	17.68
Total votes		19,094	100.0
Democratic hold			

86th District (Bay County, Saginaw County)
Party	Candidate	Votes	%
Democratic	Lewis N. Dodak (incumbent)	17,015	78.07
Republican	Amy Deal	4,779	21.92
Total votes		21,794	100.0
Democratic hold			

87th District (Livingston County, Shiawassee County)
Party	Candidate	Votes	%
Democratic	Francis Spaniola (incumbent)	15,277	66.81
Republican	Michael Gregoricka	7,588	33.18
Total votes		22,865	100.0
Democratic hold			

88th District (Barry County, Ionia County)
Party	Candidate	Votes	%
Republican	Robert Bender (incumbent)	12,536	57.44
Democratic	Mike LaVean	8,920	40.87
Independent	Dick Whitelock	364	1.66
Write-in		2	0.00
Total votes		21,822	100.0
Republican hold			

89th District (Clinton County, Gratiot County)
Party	Candidate	Votes	%
Republican	Gary L. Randall (incumbent)	14,761	64.40
Democratic	Lawrence Hollenbeck	8,065	35.18
Independent	Scott Flood	93	0.40
Write-in		1	0.00
Total votes		22,920	100.0
Republican hold			

90th District (Kent County)
Party	Candidate	Votes	%
Republican	Vic Krause (incumbent)	15,489	68.59
Democratic	Bernie Hale	7,091	31.40
Total votes		22,580	100.0
Republican hold			

91st District (Kent County)
Party	Candidate	Votes	%
Republican	Walter DeLange (incumbent)	20,085	75.51
Democratic	Donald Crandall	6,514	24.48
Total votes		26,599	100.0
Republican hold			

92nd District (Kent County)
Party	Candidate	Votes	%
Democratic	Thomas Mathieu (incumbent)	16,806	66.24
Republican	Mary Milanowski	8,562	33.75
Total votes		25,368	100.0
Democratic hold			

93rd District (Kent County)
Party	Candidate	Votes	%
Republican	Richard Bandstra (incumbent)	14,653	63.47
Democratic	W. Mayhue	8,432	36.52
Total votes		23,085	100.0
Republican hold			

94th District (Kent County)
Party	Candidate	Votes	%
Republican	Ken Sikkema	12,595	52.20
Democratic	Jelt Sietsema (incumbent)	11,533	47.79
Total votes		24,128	100.0
Republican gain from Democratic			

95th District (Ottawa County)
Party	Candidate	Votes	%
Republican	Alvin Hoekman (incumbent)	14,163	68.74
Democratic	Frances Johnson	6,439	31.25
Total votes		20,602	100.0
Republican hold			

96th District (Muskegon County)
Party	Candidate	Votes	%
Republican	M. L. Mickey Knight (incumbent)	12,213	63.39
Democratic	Paul Stark	7,051	36.60
Total votes		19,264	100.0
Republican hold			

97th District (Muskegon County)
Party	Candidate	Votes	%
Democratic	Debbie Farhat	11,060	53.91
Republican	Nancy L. Crandall	9,453	46.07
Write-in		2	0.00
Total votes		20,515	100.0
Democratic gain from Republican			

98th District (Benzie County, Manistee County, Mason County, Oceana County)
Party	Candidate	Votes	%
Republican	Ed Giese (incumbent)	15,193	63.62
Democratic	Carolyn Diem	8,685	36.37
Total votes		23,878	100.0
Republican hold			

99th District (Isabella County, Mecosta County)
Party	Candidate	Votes	%
Republican	Joanne G. Emmons	11,119	51.14
Democratic	Molly Bopp	10,617	48.83
Write-in		4	0.01
Total votes		21,740	100.0
Republican hold			

100th District (Saginaw County)
Party	Candidate	Votes	%
Democratic	Roland Niederstadt	15,296	55.67
Republican	Rold Jersevic	12,178	44.32
Total votes		27,474	100.0
Democratic gain from Republican			

101st District (Bay County)
Party	Candidate	Votes	%
Democratic	Thomas L. Hickner (incumbent)	17,307	75.67
Republican	Clair White	5,420	23.69
Tisch Independent	Marion Smith	144	0.62
Total votes		22,871	100.0
Democratic hold			

102nd District (Gratiot County, Midland County)
Party	Candidate	Votes	%
Republican	Michael D. Hayes (incumbent)	17,782	70.13
Democratic	Leo Foley	6,928	27.32
Independent	Charles Congdon	642	2.53
Write-in		1	0.00
Total votes		25,353	100.0
Republican hold			

103rd District (Antrim County, Charlevoix County, Crawford County, Oscoda County, Otsego County, Roscommon County)
Party	Candidate	Votes	%
Republican	Ralph Ostling (incumbent)	15,952	56.73
Democratic	Ellen Addington	12,164	43.26
Total votes		28,116	100.0
Republican hold			

104th District (Grand Traverse County, Kalkaska County Leelanau County)
Party	Candidate	Votes	%
Republican	Thomas G. Power (incumbent)	17,101	67.67
Democratic	Evangeline Stanchik	8,167	32.31
Write-in		2	0.00
Total votes		25,270	100.0
Republican hold			

105th District (Arenac County, Gladwin County, Iosco County, Ogemaw County)
Party	Candidate	Votes	%
Democratic	Thomas Alley (incumbent)	15,773	67.44
Republican	Michelle Morris	7,613	32.55
Total votes		23,386	100.0
Democratic hold			

106th District (Alcona County, Alpena County, Cheboygan County, Montmorency County, Presque Isle County)
Party	Candidate	Votes	%
Republican	John Pridnia (incumbent)	17,578	68.62
Democratic	Marie Twite	8,036	31.37
Total votes		25,614	100.0
Republican hold			

107th District (Alger County, Chippewa County, Emmet County, Luce County, Mackinac County, Schoolcraft County)
Party	Candidate	Votes	%
Democratic	Pat Gagliardi (incumbent)	19,544	75.90
Republican	Peter Costa	6,203	24.09
Total votes		25,747	100.0
Democratic hold			

108th District (Baraga County, Marquette County)
Party	Candidate	Votes	%
Democratic	Dominic Jacobetti (incumbent)	15,937	81.59
Republican	John Drennan	3,594	18.40
Total votes		19,531	100.0
Democratic hold			

109th District (Delta County, Dickinson County, Menominee County)
Party	Candidate	Votes	%
Republican	Jim Connors (incumbent)	12,579	51.52
Democratic	Stephen Branstrom	11,836	48.47
Total votes		24,415	100.0
Republican hold			

110th District (Gogebic County, Houghton County, Iron County, Keweenaw County, Ontonagon County)
Party	Candidate	Votes	%
Democratic	Richard A. Sofio	15,275	64.97
Republican	Gene Clemans	8,233	35.01
Write-in		2	0.00
Total votes		23,510	100.0
Democratic hold			

== See also ==
- 1986 Michigan Senate election
