= 1996 Michigan Proposal A =

Proposal A
- November 5, 1996
- A proposal to amend certain sections of Michigan Bingo Act.

Results
Choice	Votes	%
Yes	1,511,063	43.83%
No	1,936,198	56.17%
Total votes	3,447,261	100.00%
County results
Yes
50–60%
No
50–60%
60–70%

Michigan Proposal A was rejected by Michigan voters on November 5, 1996. The state ballot initiative, if successful, would have upheld a 1994 ban on the use of bingo, and other such games, for political fundraising.

The referendum was initiated by a Democratic-affiliated group in hopes of suspending and ultimately invalidating the ban on political bingo passed by the Republican-controlled Michigan legislature. Bingo was used extensively by the Michigan Democratic Party to raise campaign funds. The rejection of the referendum invalidated the 1994 ban.

A court ruling in 2000 upheld a law passed in January 1996, which banned political bingo, despite the referendum.

== Ballot language ==
The following was the language of the proposal on the ballot, as reported by The Ann Arbor News:

A referendum on Public Act 118 of 1994 — an act to amend certain sections of Michigan's bingo act.

Public Act 118 of 1994 would:

1. Change the definition of a qualified organization which is permitted to sponsor certain forms of gaming, including bingo, millionaire parties, and raffles, so that an organization which is organized under the Michigan Campaign Finance Act, including a candidate committee, political committee, political party committee, ballot question committee, or independent committee, is no longer qualified to receive a license to sponsor such gaming.

2. Permit a change in the single maximum prize or payout for a charity game sold by a licensed religious, educational, service, senior citizens, fraternal or veterans organization.

Should this law be approved?

== History ==
=== 1994 Bingo amendment ===
Bingo as a means of political fundraising was mostly utilized by the Democrats. In 1996, Ingham County Democratic Chairwoman June Pallottini said that bingo was the largest individual source of campaign funds for the party. Bingo games raised an estimated $2 million for the party annually. Democrats argued bingo allowed middle-class people to support the party.

State Senate Majority Leader Dick Posthumus described political bingo as "one of the biggest single loopholes in the campaign finance law". Republicans argued that political bingo was a loophole on the basis that contributors were able to donate to political organizations anonymously. Republicans further argued that bingo was intended to be used for charities, not campaign fundraising.

In 1994, the Republicans held a majority in the Michigan State Senate and there was an even 55–55 split of Democrats and Republicans in the Michigan House of Representatives. On April 13, 1994, the state Senate passed Senate Bill 3, which would ban the use of bingo for political fundraisers. On April 22, utilizing a temporary Republican majority in the chamber caused by vacancies, Senate Bill 3 passed through the state House. Republican Governor John Engler signed the bill into law on May 12. It amended the Michigan Bingo Act. It was to take effect at the beginning of April 1995.

=== Signature drive and lawsuits ===
A Democrat-affiliated group, Bingo Is Necessary for Grassroots Organization (BINGO), formed to oppose the political bingo ban. On December 22, 1994, the group announced they had collected over 175,000 signatures from Michigan voters, calling for a referendum on the political bingo ban.

BINGO filed petitions containing 242,679 signatures with the state election bureau on January 31, 1995. On February 13, Republican Secretary of State Candice Miller rejected around 85,000 signatures, those collected before November 8, 1994. She did so based on her interpretation of a 1975 attorney general opinion and case law, stating that signatures for state ballot proposals must be collected between gubernatorial elections. BINGO interpreted the law as not applying to referendums. Democratic Attorney General Frank J. Kelley criticized Miller for overstepping her authority. The Michigan Democratic Party filed a lawsuit on February 22 in Wayne County circuit court, attempting to suspend the political bingo ban until the referendum took place.

It was announced by the Michigan Secretary of State's office on March 6, that after initial testing, 154,758 signatures were considered valid. This meant that for the rest of the process, 99.8% of the remaining signatures would have to be considered valid to meet the 154,454 signature minimum for the referendum to quality to appear on the November ballot. The head of the elections bureau said that no petition drive ever had a validity rate above 92%. After the sampling process, only around 152,900 remained valid, falling short of the minimum requirements. The Board of State Canvassers deadlocked 2–2 on whether or not to accept the signature count. On March 10, the Democratic Party asked the Michigan Court of Appeals to rule on the rejection of the 85,000 signatures.

On January 7, 1996, Governor Engler signed another bill related to bingo. The bill, proposed by Republican State Rep. Susan Grimes Munsell, was intended to allow the Loyal Order of Moose to operate bingo fundraisers. The bill passed with bipartisan support. Engler said, after the bill had passed, that he interpreted it as indirectly banning political bingo. Munsell explained that it was not the intention of the bill. On January 30, Wayne County Circuit Court Judge James Rashid ordered the Michigan Lottery Bureau to continue issuing political lottery licenses until the Court of Appeals ruling. The bureau complied with the ruling.

On February 12, the Court of Appeals ruled, ordering a recount of the signatures including the rejected 85,000 signatures. By June, the Michigan Supreme Court declined to hear an appeal of the ruling, effectively upholding it. The Board of State Canvassers certified 170,009 signatures, allowing the referendum to appear on the November ballot.

The Democrats spent $375,000 on the signature drive, not including legal expenses.

=== Referendum and aftermath ===
The referendum was held on November 5, 1996, alongside the general election. It was one of six statewide ballot proposals that year. The referendum was rejected, with 1,511,063 "yes" votes and 1,936,198 "no" votes. The rejection of the referendum invalidated the 1994 political bingo ban.

By February 1998, Lottery Commissioner Bill Martin refused to issue bingo licenses to political organizations. He interpreted political bingo as being illegal under Michigan law, despite the referendum, due to the January 1996 bingo law. The Michigan Democratic Party sued the lottery bureau. On February 18, Wayne County Circuit Court Judge James Rashid ruled that the referendum reversed the political bingo ban implied by the 1996 law in addition to the 1994 ban. Martin complied with the ruling, and began to issue bingo licenses to political organizations again.

A 2000 Court of Appeals ruling upheld the right of the state legislature to pass the January 1996 law, regardless of the referendum. This banned political bingo. On January 17, 2002, the Federal Election Commission ruled 4–2 that the state law also prohibited bingo from being used to raise funds for federal candidates' campaigns in Michigan.

== See also ==
- List of Michigan ballot proposals
