= Vern Ehlers =

American politician (1934–2017)

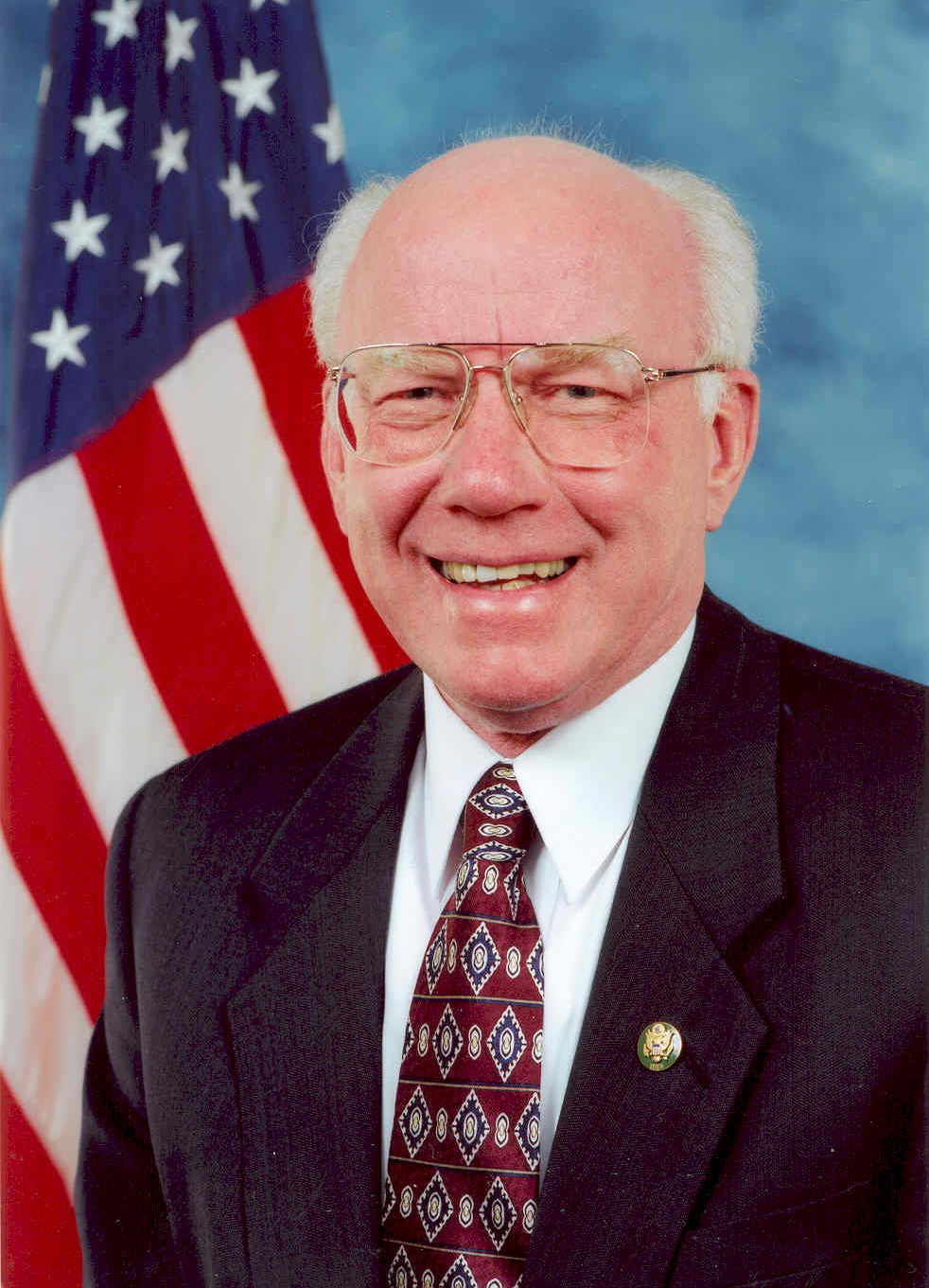

Chair of the House Administration Committee
- In office November 3, 2006 – January 3, 2007
- Preceded by: Bob Ney
- Succeeded by: Juanita Millender-McDonald

Member of the U.S. House of Representatives from Michigan's 3rd district
- In office December 7, 1993 – January 3, 2011 (Note: Ehlers's official service begins on the date of the special election, while he was not sworn in until January 25, 1994.)
- Preceded by: Paul Henry
- Succeeded by: Justin Amash

Member of the Michigan Senate from the 32nd district
- In office 1985–1993
- Preceded by: Paul B. Henry
- Succeeded by: Glenn Steil Sr.

Member of the Michigan House of Representatives from the 93rd district
- In office 1983–1985
- Preceded by: John Otterbacher
- Succeeded by: Richard Bandstra

Personal details
- Born: Vernon James Ehlers; February 6, 1934 Pipestone, Minnesota, U.S.
- Died: August 15, 2017 (aged 83) Grand Rapids, Michigan, U.S.
- Party: Republican
- Spouse: Johanna Ehlers
- Education: Calvin College (attended); University of California, Berkeley (BA, PhD)
- Vern Ehlers's voice Vern Ehlers eulogizes Ronald Reagan for his contributions as President; Recorded June 9, 2004

Vernon James Ehlers (February 6, 1934 – August 15, 2017) was an American physicist and politician who represented Michigan in the U.S. House of Representatives from 1993 until his retirement in 2011. A Republican, he also served eight years in the Michigan Senate and two in the Michigan House of Representatives.

Ehlers was the first research physicist to be elected to Congress; he was later joined by Rush Holt Jr. (D-NJ) and Bill Foster (D-IL).

The Amtrak station in Grand Rapids is named after him.

== Early life, education, and academic career ==
Born in Pipestone, Minnesota, Ehlers attended Calvin College in Grand Rapids for three years before transferring to the University of California, Berkeley, where he earned an undergraduate degree in physics and, in 1960, a Ph.D. in nuclear physics. His doctoral dissertation, "The nuclear spins and moments of several radioactive gallium isotopes", is available from University Microfilms International as document number 0227304. After six years of teaching and research at Berkeley, he moved back to Michigan and took employment at Calvin College in 1966, where he taught physics for 16 years and later served as chairman of the Physics Department.

Ehlers died on August 15, 2017, at the age of 83.

== Early political career ==
Ehlers served on the Kent County Board of Commissioners from 1975 to 1982. Ehlers served from 1983 to 1985 in the Michigan House of Representatives and then served from 1985 to 1993 in the Michigan Senate.

== U.S. House of Representatives ==
=== Committee assignments ===
- Committee on Education and Labor
  - Subcommittee on Early Childhood, Elementary and Secondary Education
  - Subcommittee on Higher Education, Lifelong Learning, and Competitiveness
- Committee on House Administration (Chairman and Ranking Member)
- Committee on Science and Technology
  - Subcommittee on Energy and Environment
  - Subcommittee on Research and Science Education (Ranking Member)
- Committee on Transportation and Infrastructure
  - Subcommittee on Aviation
  - Subcommittee on Coast Guard and Maritime Transportation
  - Subcommittee on Water Resources and Environment

=== Caucus memberships ===
- Co-chair of the STEM (science, technology, engineering and mathematics) Ed Caucus
- Peak Oil Caucus

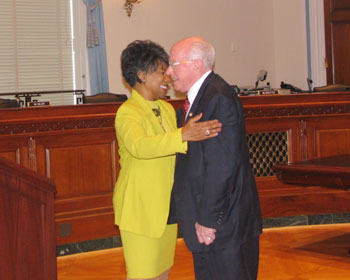
Chairman Ehlers greets Ranking Member Juanita Millender-McDonald at a hearing of the House Administration Committee.

Ehlers served as chairman of the House Administration Committee in the 109th Congress after Bob Ney resigned from the position.

A portrait of Ehlers during his service as chairman of the Administration Committee is in the House collection.

== Political positions ==
Ehlers was a moderate Republican. According to the National Journal, in 2006 his votes split 50-50 between "liberal" and "conservative." While strongly anti-abortion and supportive of lowering taxes, he was willing to break with his party on environmental and government spending issues. He was a member of the Republican Main Street Partnership and Republicans for Environmental Protection. He was the only member of the Michigan Congressional delegation of either party to vote to raise fuel economy standards for automobiles in 2001 and 2005.

Ehlers was a staunch advocate of a federal prohibition of online poker. In 2006 he cosponsored H.R. 4411, the Goodlatte-Leach Internet Gambling Prohibition Act and H.R. 4777, the Internet Gambling Prohibition Act.

Owing to his votes in favor of the Federal Marriage Amendment in both 2004 and 2006, as well as his votes against hate crimes legislation and prohibiting job discrimination based on sexual orientation, Ehlers was given a 0% rating by the Human Rights Campaign, indicating a voting record generally opposed to gay rights. However, in December 2010, Ehlers was one of fifteen Republican House members to vote in favor of repealing the United States military's "Don't Ask, Don't Tell" ban on openly gay service members, and one of eight Republicans to vote for the DREAM Act.

== Political campaigns ==
In 1993 Ehlers won a special election for the 3rd District, which had been vacant since Congressman Paul B. Henry died six months into his fifth term. He won a full term in 1994 and was re-elected six times with little significant Democratic opposition. Ehlers retired from Congress in 2010.

== Selected publications ==
=== Lead authored articles in scientific journals ===
- Ehlers, Vernon; Gallagher, Alan (1973). "Electron Excitation of the Calcium 4227-Å Resonance Line". Physical Review A. 7 (5): 1573–1585. Bibcode:1973PhRvA...7.1573E. doi:10.1103/PhysRevA.7.1573. ISSN 1050-2947.
- Ehlers, Vernon; Kabasakal, Yurdanur; Shugart, Howard; Tezer, Orhan (1968). "Hyperfine Structure of 67Ga and 72Ga". Physical Review. 176 (1): 25–42. Bibcode:1968PhRv..176...25E. doi:10.1103/PhysRev.176.25. ISSN 0031-899X.
- Ehlers, Vernon; Fowler, Thomas; Shugart, Howard (1968). "Nuclear Magnetic Moment of 85Rb: Resolving a Discrepancy". Physical Review. 167 (4): 1062–1064. Bibcode:1968PhRv..167.1062E. doi:10.1103/PhysRev.167.1062. ISSN 0031-899X.
- Ehlers, Vernon; Shugart, Howard (1962). "Hyperfine-Structure Separations and Nuclear Moments of Gallium-68". Physical Review. 127 (2): 529–536. Bibcode:1962PhRv..127..529E. doi:10.1103/PhysRev.127.529. ISSN 0031-899X.
- Ehlers, V. J.; Nierenberg, W. A.; Shugart, H. A. (1962). "Nuclear Spin of Gallium-70". Physical Review. 125 (6): 2008–2012. Bibcode:1962PhRv..125.2008E. doi:10.1103/PhysRev.125.2008. ISSN 0031-899X. S2CID 120163937.

=== Articles on science policy ===
- Ehlers, Congressman Vernon J. (September 2000). "Science Education and Our Nation's Future". BioScience. 50 (9): 731. doi:10.1641/0006-3568(2000)050[0731:SEAONS]2.0.CO;2. ISSN 0006-3568.
- Ehlers, V. J. (January 1998). "The Future of U.S. Science Policy". Science. 279 (5349): 302a–302. Bibcode:1998Sci...279..302E. doi:10.1126/science.279.5349.302a. S2CID 154533319.

Michigan House of Representatives
Preceded by John Otterbacher	Member of the Michigan House of Representatives from the 93rd district 1983–1985	Succeeded by Richard Bandstra
Michigan Senate
Preceded by Paul B. Henry	Member of the Michigan Senate from the 32nd district 1985–1993	Succeeded by Glenn Steil Sr.
U.S. House of Representatives
Preceded by Paul B. Henry	Member of the U.S. House of Representatives from Michigan's 3rd congressional district 1993–2011	Succeeded by Justin Amash
Preceded by Bob Ney	Chairman of the House Administration Committee; 2006–2007	Succeeded by Juanita Millender-McDonald
