= George Prescott =

American politician

George A. Prescott
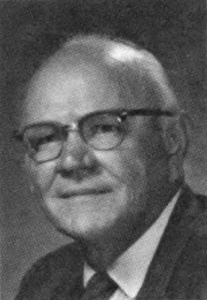

Member of the Michigan House of Representatives
- In office January 1, 1967 – December 31, 1978
- Preceded by: Sanford E. Charron
- Succeeded by: Thomas Alley
- Constituency: 102nd district (1967–1972); 105th district (1973–1978)

Iosco County Clerk
- In office 1951–1966

Personal details
- Born: George Allen Prescott; March 6, 1913 Tawas City, Michigan
- Died: February 1988
- Party: Republican

George Allen Prescott (March 6, 1913 – February 1988) was a Republican member of the Michigan House of Representatives representing the northeastern part of the Lower Peninsula between 1967 and 1978.

A native of Tawas City, Prescott graduated from Western Reserve Academy and Michigan State University. He was Iosco County clerk from 1951 until his election to the House. Prescott was the third generation of his family elected to the Legislature (his grandfather, George A. Prescott, was a state senator in the late 1890s and secretary of state in the early 1900s, and his uncle, Charles T. Prescott, was a state senator from 1945 to 1961).
