= 1996 Michigan elections =

- November 5, 1996

The 1996 Michigan elections were held in the U.S. state of Michigan on November 5, 1996. The presidential primary was held on March 19. The state primary was held on August 6.

== Federal ==
=== Presidential primaries and caucuses ===
The Democratic presidential caucus in Michigan was held on March 16. Incumbent president Bill Clinton won unopposed. He would also win the presidential nomination nationally.

The presidential primary election was held on March 19 in Michigan. Bob Dole won the Republican presidential primary and was nominated nationally. Because of the Democratic caucus, Clinton's name didn't appear on the Democratic presidential primary ballot. The only option on the ballot was uncommitted. The Democratic primary didn't effect the delegates in the national election.

=== Presidential general election ===
Incumbent Democratic president Bill Clinton won Michigan in the presidential general election, defeating Republican nominee Bob Dole. All 18 of Michigan's electoral votes went to Clinton. Clinton won re-election nationally.

=== U.S. Senate ===
Incumbent Democratic senator Carl Levin won re-election, defeating Republican nominee Ronna Romney.

=== U.S. House of Representatives ===
The Democrats gained one seat, resulting in a 10–6 Democratic majority in Michigan's U.S. House delegation.

== Legislature ==
=== Senate special election ===
A special primary election for Michigan's 15th Senate district was held on May 13, and the special general election was held on June 4. The special election was triggered by the resignation of Republican State Sen. David Honigman in March, due to ill health. The special election was won by Republican Bill Bullard Jr.

=== House of Representatives ===
Due to two vacancies, before the election, the Republicans had a 55–53 majority in the state House. After the election, the Democrats won a 58–52 majority in the chamber.

== Judiciary ==
=== Supreme Court ===
There were two full terms on the Michigan Supreme Court up for election on November 5, 1996. Incumbent independent Charles Levin did not seek re-election, while incumbent Republican James H. Brickley did seek re-election. Brickley and Democrat Marilyn Jean Kelly won election. This resulted in a 4–3 Democratic majority on the court.

== Michigan State Board of Education and University boards ==
=== Michigan State Board of Education ===
Incumbent Republicans Louis Legg and Marilyn Lundy lost re-election to Democrats Marianne Yard McGuire and Herb Moyer. This resulted in an even 4–4 split of Republicans and Democrats on the board.

=== Michigan State University Board of Trustees ===
Incumbents Democrat Robert Weiss and the appointed Republican David Porteous sought election. Weiss was re-elected, while Porteous was defeated by Democrat Joel Ferguson. This resulted in a 5–3 Democratic majority on the board, which previously had an even 4–4 split of Republicans and Democrats.

=== University of Michigan Board of Regents ===
Incumbent Republican Deane Baker sought re-election, while incumbent Democrat Nellie Varner did not. Baker was defeated in her attempt at re-election, the election being won by Democrats Olivia Maynard and Martin Taylor. This resulted in a 5–3 Democratic majority on the board, which previously had an even 4–4 split of Republicans and Democrats.

=== Wayne State University Board of Governors ===
Incumbents Democrat Murray Jackson and the appointed Republican Vernice Davis-Anthony sought election. Davis-Anthony was defeated, and Democrats Jackson and Annetta Miller won the election. This resulted in a 5–3 Democratic majority on the board, which previously had an even 4–4 split of Republicans and Democrats.

== Ballot initiatives ==
=== State ballot proposals ===
There were six state ballot proposals voted upon on November 5, 1996. Proposal A, which sought to ban the use of bingo games as political fundraisers, was rejected. Proposal B, which sought to require those running for judicial positions have at least five years of experience serving as lawyers, was approved. Proposal C, which sought to turn the Michigan Veterans' Trust Fund into a state constitutional fund, was approved. Proposal D, which sought to ban the use of baiting and dogs in black bear hunting, was rejected. Proposal E, which sought to allow the establishing of up to three casinos in Detroit, was approved. Proposal G, which sought to give the Natural Resources Commission full authority over state wildlife management, was approved.
