= Gary Owen (politician) =

American politician (born 1944)

Gary M. Owen
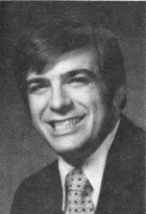

62nd Speaker of the Michigan House of Representatives
- In office 1983–1988
- Governor: James J. Blanchard
- Preceded by: Bobby Crim
- Succeeded by: Lew Dodak

Member of the Michigan House of Representatives from the 22nd district
- In office January 1, 1973 – December 31, 1988
- Preceded by: Daisy Elliott
- Succeeded by: Kirk Profit

Personal details
- Born: September 9, 1944 (age 82) Lawrence County, Alabama
- Party: Democratic
- Education: University of Michigan

Gary M. Owen (born September 9, 1944) is a Democratic Michigan politician who served as a member and as Speaker of the Michigan House of Representatives. Upon his election, Owen was appointed to the House Appropriations Committee, the first-ever freshman appointed to that committee in history.

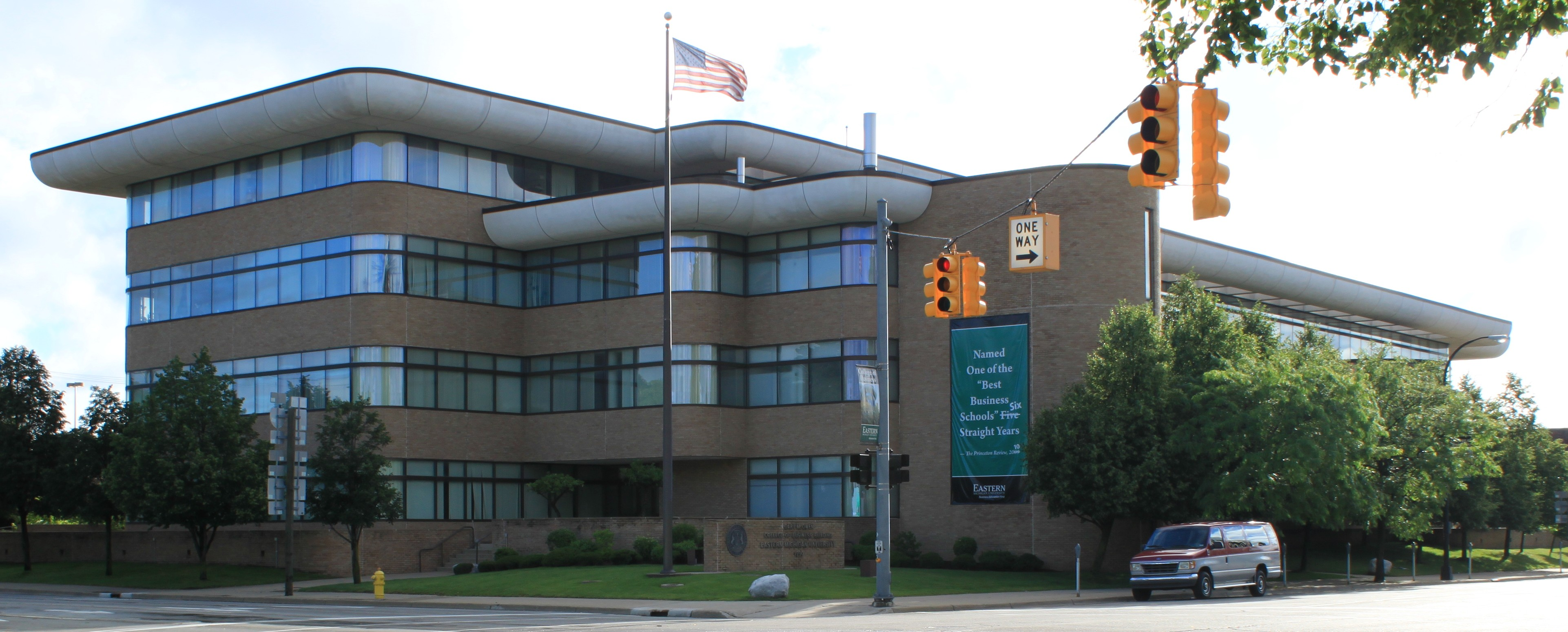
Gary M. Owen College of Business building at Eastern Michigan University

The main building for the Eastern Michigan University College of Business is named after Owen.

== See also ==
- List of Michigan state legislatures
