= Jan C. Dolan =

American politician (1927–2016)

Member of the Michigan House of Representatives
- In office January 1, 1989 – December 31, 1996
- Preceded by: Wilbur Brotherton
- Succeeded by: Rocky Raczkowski
- Constituency: 69th district (1989–1992); 37th district (1993–1996)

6th and 13th Mayor of Farmington Hills
- In office 1985–1985
- Preceded by: Charles H. Williams
- Succeeded by: Joe Alkateeb
- In office 1978–1978
- Preceded by: Joan D. Dudley
- Succeeded by: Earl C. Opperthauser

Personal details
- Born: January 15, 1927 Akron, Ohio
- Died: November 1, 2016 (aged 89) Farmington Hills, Michigan
- Party: Republican
- Education: University of Akron

Jan C. Dolan (January 15, 1927 – November 1, 2016) was a Republican member of the Michigan House of Representatives from 1989 through 1996.

Dolan graduated from the University of Akron and worked as a hospital dietitian. Dolan won election to the Farmington Hills city council in 1974 and served for 14 years. She was mayor on two occasions. Dolan won election to the House in 1988.

After leaving the House, she continued as a member of several community organizations. The City of Farmington Hills honored her with the Nancy Bates Distinguished Public Servant Award in May 2016. Dolan died on November 1, 2016, aged 89, of respiratory failure.
