= Debbie Schlussel =

American writer

- Born: April 9, 1969 (age 57); Detroit, Michigan, U.S.
- Education: University of Michigan (BA); University of Wisconsin, Madison (JD, MBA)
- Website: Official website

Debbie Schlussel (born April 9, 1969) is an American attorney, author, political commentator, movie critic, TV host, and blogger. She writes movie reviews and commentary focusing on pop culture, politics, Islamic terrorism, American Muslims, illegal immigration, news, and sports.

== Professional life and views ==
Schlussel is a member of the Detroit Film Critics Society, who reviews films for both radio and her website.

The New York Times described her in 2010 as, "a kind of all-purpose film critic, political commentator and Web opinion spinner." She was a talk show host at radio station WXYT-FM, then known as WKRK, in Detroit from 2002 to 2003.

=== Muslims and Islam ===
Professor of Media and Public Affairs William Youmans described Schussel as a "leading right-wing observer of AD [Arab Detroit, whose] blogging, articles, and op-eds inform other right-wing activists, who mobilize against government-community relations when they seem too cozy. This group has called for greater scrutiny of Arab and Muslim Americans by government officials, and officials they consider pro-Arab are frequent targets of their protests. Consistently, Schlussel and her allies have described Detroit's Arab Americans as potential terrorists." Professor Julianne Hammer described Schussel as an "anti-Muslim pundit".

Schlussel has alleged that American politicians, including the late former Republican Senator Fred Thompson and former Democratic President Barack Obama, have connections with radical Islam, In October 2001 she alleged that President George W. Bush was connected to the Council on American–Islamic Relations (CAIR). CAIR later sued Schlussel of trademark violation when she used their acronym in a web-domain directing readers to Islamophobic webpages.

In 2007, she stated that atheists are intolerant of Christians, and that American Muslims are no more moderate than those in the Middle East; that blog post of hers was read aloud on The Rush Limbaugh Show.

After the killing of Osama bin Laden, Schlussel wrote on her blog, "1 down, 1.8 billion to go", referring to the world's total Muslim population.

In 2011, she was listed by the Southern Poverty Law Center (SPLC) as one of 10 people in the United States' "Anti-Muslim Inner Circle". She has been identified as part of the counter-jihad movement.

=== Controversies related to comments on the Holocaust ===
On May 30, 2012, Schlussel wrote a blog post commenting about a speech by President Barack Obama, in which he mistakenly used the phrase "Polish death camps" referring to the German death camps in occupied Poland. She said Obama owed no apology for his remark, and she criticized

the feigned shock and fake moralizing over his comments, yesterday, about German Nazi death camps in Poland being a Polish death camp ... Poles murdered millions of Jews, they maintained several death camps, and they wiped out almost all of both sides of my family, as well as those in hundreds of thousands of other Jewish families. This wasn't just the Nazis. It was tens of thousands of eager Poles and more.

In addition to discussing Polish collaboration with the Nazis, she said that a "majority were all too happy for the Judenrein". She discounted the Polish Righteous Among the Nations by stating that only a "very tiny few" gentile Poles aided the Jews. Her commentary provoked protest in Poland. The chairman of the Polish Parliament's Foreign Affairs Commission, Grzegorz Schetyna, called her commentary a pack of lies.

In its daily news release, the Polish government-affiliated Institute of National Remembrance dubbed Schlussel's commentary as defamatory.
