= Tom F. Middleton =

American politician

Tom F. Middleton (born July 29, 1945) is an American politician. A member of the Republican Party, he served in the Michigan House of Representatives from 1991 to 1998.
