= Ralph Ostling =

American politician

Ralph A. Ostling
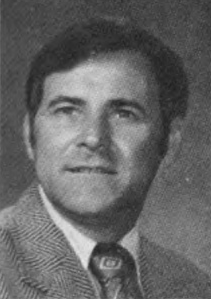

Member of the Michigan House of Representatives from the 103rd district
- In office January 1, 1973 – December 31, 1992
- Preceded by: Louis K. Cramton
- Succeeded by: Thomas Alley

Personal details
- Born: July 3, 1927 Roscommon, Michigan
- Died: July 29, 2009 (aged 82) Roscommon, Michigan
- Party: Republican
- Education: Michigan State University (M.A.); Central Michigan University (B.A.)

Military service
- Allegiance: United States
- Branch/service: United States Navy

Ralph A. Ostling (1927–2009) was a Republican member of the Michigan House of Representatives, representing an area of northern Michigan from 1973 through 1992.

== Biography ==
Ralph A. Ostling was born in 1927 in Roscommon, Michigan to Swedish parents. Ostling graduated from Central Michigan University in 1952 and earned a master's degree from Michigan State University. He served in the United States Navy in 1945 and 1946 and married Thela Dean at the end of 1947. Ostling taught and coached at his alma mater, Gerrish-Higgins High School, for 20 years and was elected Gerrish Township clerk in 1956.

In 1972, Ostling won his first election to the legislature. While in the House, he served on the Appropriations Committee, rising to serve as Republican vice chairman. Ostling served ten terms, leaving in 1992 to become a lobbyist.

Ostling died in Roscommon on July 29, 2009, aged 82.
