= Wilbur Brotherton =

American politician (1922–2021)

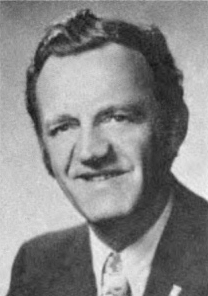

Member of the Michigan House of Representatives from the 64th district
- In office 1975–1988

Personal details
- Born: July 6, 1922 Chicago, Illinois, U.S.
- Died: January 15, 2021 (aged 98)
- Party: Republican
- Spouse: Yvonne
- Children: two
- Education: Northwestern University
- Occupation: executive

Wilbur Vernon "Sandy" Brotherton (July 6, 1922 – January 15, 2021) was an American politician and businessman from the state of Michigan.

== Biography ==
Brotherton was born in Chicago, Illinois and went to Waller High School in Chicago. He served in the United States Army Air Corps during World War II and was a navigator. Brotherton went to Northwestern University. Brotherton He lived in Farmington, Michigan with his wife and family and worked as an executive for the Packard & Chrysler Corporation Chr. Brotherton served on the Farmington City Council and was mayor of Farmington from 1965 to 1973. Brotherton also served on the Oakland County Commission. He served in the Michigan House of Representatives from 1975 to 1988 and was a Republican.
