= Paul Hillegonds =

American politician

The Honorable Paul C. Hillegonds

65th Speaker of the Michigan House of Representatives
- In office January 13, 1993 – December 30, 1996 Serving with Curtis Hertel (1993–1994)
- Preceded by: Lew Dodak
- Succeeded by: Curtis Hertel

Member of the Michigan House of Representatives
- In office January 1, 1979 – December 31, 1996
- Preceded by: Edgar Fredricks
- Succeeded by: Patricia L. Birkholz
- Constituency: 54th district (1979–1992); 88th district (1993–1996)

Personal details
- Born: March 4, 1949 (age 77) Holland, Michigan
- Party: Republican
- Education: University of Michigan (B.A.); Thomas Cooley Law School

Paul C. Hillegonds (born March 4, 1949) was a Republican member of the Michigan House of Representatives. He served as co-speaker with Democrat Curtis Hertel from 1993 until 1994.

Hillegonds received his bachelor's degree from the University of Michigan and a law degree from Thomas M. Cooley Law School.

Hillegonds was first elected to the state house in 1978, beginning his service in 1979. He previously had been a legislative aid and campaign chairman for U.S. Representative Philip Ruppe. He was the leader of the Republicans in the house beginning in 1987. He served as speaker of the house from 1995-1996, after having been co-speaker for one term.

In 1997 Hillegonds left the legislature to become president of Detroit Renaissance. He remained in this position for nine years. In 2006 he was a co-leader of 'One United Michigan the main group opposed to the end of affirmative action on the ballot at the time.

From 2002 to 2004, Hillegonds served as a member of the Wayne State University board of governors.

Hillegonds now works as the director of government relations for DTE Energy.

In early 2013 Hillegonds was appointed director of the newly formed Southeast Michigan Regional Transit Authority.

== Origin of the name Hillegonds ==
The name Hillegonds is originally Dutch. It is a matronymic and stands for "the child of Hillegond", a variant of the name Hildegonde. The family name probably does not occur any more in The Netherlands.

== See also ==
- List of Michigan state legislatures

== Sources ==
- Daniel Loepp. Sharing the Balance of Power: An Examination of Shared Power in the Michigan House of Representatives, 1993-94. Ann Arbor: University of Michigan Press, 1999.
- Forbes bio of Hillegonds

== Notes ==
Michigan House of Representatives
Preceded by Edgar Fredricks	Member of the Michigan House of Representatives from the 54th district 1979–1993	Succeeded by Kirk Profit
Preceded by Robert G. Bender	Member of the Michigan House of Representatives from the 88th district 1993–1997	Succeeded by Patricia L. Birkholz
Political offices
Preceded by Lewis N. Dodak	Speaker of the Michigan House of Representatives; 1993–1997	Succeeded by Curtis Hertel
