= Jessie Dalman =

American politician (born 1933)

Member of the Michigan House of Representatives from the 90th district
- In office 1993–1998
- Preceded by: Jack Horton
- Succeeded by: Wayne Kuipers

Personal details
- Born: March 17, 1933 (age 93) Detroit, Michigan
- Party: Republican
- Education: Michigan State University; University of Michigan
- Occupation: Politician

Jessie Fiesselmann Dalman (born March 17, 1933) is a former American politician who was member of the Michigan House of Representatives for the 90th district.
