= Bill Martin (politician) =

American politician

Bill Martin is a former member of the Michigan House of Representatives and former chief executive officer of Florida Realtors, the state's largest trade association.

Bill Martin was born and raised in Ypsilanti Michigan. Bill graduated Ypsilanti High School and Western Michigan University.

Martin joined the Michigan State Police as a Trooper In 1978, the same year he married Denise Andrews. Denise also graduated from Ypsilanti High and Western Michigan University.

After graduating from Ypsilanti High School, Bill joined the U.S. Army serving with the 101st and 509th Airborne unit as well as the 529th MP's. Bill was honorably discharged and returned to his hometown of Ypsilanti Michigan.

Bill met Denise Andrews in the spring of 1975. They were married on July 8, 1978. Bill and Denise moved to Battle Creek Michigan were Bill was assigned as a Michigan State Trooper. They had two children, Haley and Brittany.

Bill and Denise owned a family business with her brother Al Andrews. Denise ran the family business until they sold it in the early 2000s.

== Political service ==
In 1987, Martin defeated Democratic opponent Ann Rosenbaum and replaced Richard Fitzpatrick in the Michigan House of Representatives serving Calhoun County, Michigan; a position he held for four terms.

Former Michigan governor John Engler appointed Martin commissioner of the Michigan State Lottery in 1995; and in 1999 appointed him director and CEO of the state's largest department, the Michigan Department of Corrections. Martin resigned from the department of corrections in 2002 to become the new CEO of the Michigan Association of Realtors. Martin was also appointed as a trustee on the Western Michigan Board of Trustees in 2002, serving his almamater, where he graduated summa cum laude, for 8 years before stepping down.

Rick Snyder, then governor of Michigan, appointed Martin to the State Officers Compensation Commission in 2014. Snyder appointed Bill to the MEGA Board which was a part of the MEDC.
