= H. Lynn Jondahl =

American politician from Michigan

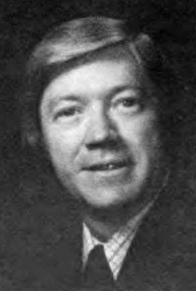

Member of the Michigan House of Representatives from the 70th district
- In office January 13, 1993 – December 31, 1994
- Preceded by: Lloyd F. Weeks
- Succeeded by: Laura Baird

Member of the Michigan House of Representatives from the 59th district
- In office January 10, 1973 – December 31, 1993
- Preceded by: Jim N. Brown
- Succeeded by: Glenn S. Oxender

Personal details
- Born: July 10, 1936 (age 90) Emmetsburg, Iowa
- Party: Democratic
- Education: Yale Divinity School (M.Div.); University of Iowa (B.A.)

H. Lynn Jondahl (born 10 July 1936) was a Democratic member of the Michigan House of Representatives, representing an area near the state capital, Lansing, for two decades.

A native of Iowa, Jondahl earned a bachelor's degree in history at the University of Iowa in 1958 and a master's in divinity from Yale in 1962. He is an ordained minister in the United Church of Christ. Jondahl was a candidate for Governor of Michigan in 1994, and led Governor Jennifer Granholm's transition team in 2002. While he was considered a liberal during his time in the House, Jondahl considered himself a Republican until Barry Goldwater ran for president in 1964. Jondahl served on the State Board of Ethics from 2003 through 2011.
