= Floyd Clack =

American educator and politician (1940–2025)

Floyd Clack (December 21, 1940 – April 3, 2025) was an American educator and politician. Among other offices, he served as a member of the Michigan House of Representatives.

== Life and career ==
Born in Houston, Texas on December 21, 1940, Clack had an M.A. in Education from EMU in 1972. He taught for many years in the Flint Public Schools and was also a guidance counselor in that school district.

Clack began his career as a politician with an election to the Flint City Council in 1979. He served in that position until 1992 when he was elected to the Michigan House of Representatives. He served in the Michigan House until 1996 when he was ineligible to run for reelection due to term limits. From 1996–2004 he served as a member of the Genesee County Board of Commissioners. In 2005 he was appointed to the EMU Board of Regents by Governor Jennifer Granholm.

In 2003, Clack made an unsuccessful run for mayor of Flint. Clack was one of the Democratic candidates for Michigan Senate District 27 in the 2006 election. Clack's wife, Brenda Clack, also served in the House.

Clack died on April 3, 2025, at the age of 84.

== Sources ==
- Plaque in the John W. Porter College of Education, Eastern Michigan University honoring Clack
- Eastern Michigan University bio of Clack
- Michigan Chronicle, Nov. 24, 2003
- Legislator Details - Floyd E. Clack
