= Teola Pearl Hunter =

American politician from Michigan

Teola Pearl Hunter (born February 5, 1933) is an American educator and politician.

Teola Pearl Hunter, circ 1984

Born in Detroit, Michigan, Hunter graduated from Cass Technical High School in 1949. She received her bachelor's degree in education in 1958 from University of Detroit Mercy and her master's degree in elementary school guidance and counseling in 1971 from Wayne State University. She then taught in the Detroit public schools. From 1981 until her resignation in January 1992 Hunter served in the Michigan House of Representatives and was a Democrat. She was appointed deputy director for the Wayne County Health and Community Services Department.

== See also ==
- Triette Reeves
