= Robert Bender =

American politician from Michigan (1936–2025)

Member of the Michigan House of Representatives
- In office 1983–1995

Personal details
- Born: September 28, 1936
- Died: March 7, 2025 (aged 88) Middleville, Michigan, U.S.
- Party: Republican
- Education: Michigan State University

Robert Gordon Bender (September 28, 1936 – March 7, 2025) was an American politician who was a Republican member of the Michigan House of Representatives (1983–1995).

Bender attended Michigan State University before joining the United States Navy in 1959. He died on March 7, 2025, at the age of 88.
