= William R. Keith =

American businessman and politician

William Raymond Keith (October 24, 1929 – January 30, 2009) was an American businessman and politician.

Born in Jackson, Michigan, Keith served in the United States Army. He went to the University of Michigan School of Banking. Keith was involved in the banking business and lived in Garden City, Michigan. He served on the Garden City Board of Education. Keith served in the Michigan House of Representatives from 1973 to 1994. He was a Democrat. He died on January 30, 2009.
