= Gary L. Randall =

American politician

Clerk of the Michigan House of Representatives
- In office January 12, 2011 – January 11, 2023
- Preceded by: Rich Brown
- Succeeded by: Rich Brown
- In office January 13, 1999 – December 31, 2006
- Preceded by: Mary Kay Scullion
- Succeeded by: Rich Brown

Member of the Michigan House of Representatives from the 93rd district 89th District (January 1, 1979-December 31, 1992)
- In office January 1, 1993 – December 31, 1996
- Preceded by: John Engler
- Succeeded by: Larry DeVuyst

Personal details
- Born: June 18, 1943 (age 83)
- Party: Republican
- Education: Central Michigan University (M.A.); Michigan State University (B.S.)

Gary L. Randall is a Republican politician from Michigan who served as the clerk of the Michigan House of Representatives on two occasions from 1999–2006 and again from 2011–2023. Randall served as either clerk or assistant clerk from 1999 until his retirement in 2023. before he served as clerk, Randall was a member of the House, representing parts of mid-Michigan from 1979 to 1996.

On June 3, 2013, Randall was appointed the Griffin Endowed Chair in American Government at Central Michigan University.
