= Joseph Palamara =

American politician (born 1963)

Member of the Wayne County Commission from the 15th District
- Incumbent
- Assumed office January 1, 1999

Member of the Michigan House of Representatives
- In office January 1, 1985 – December 31, 1998
- Preceded by: Jeffrey Padden
- Succeeded by: William O'Neill
- Constituency: 30th district (1985–1992); 24th district (1993–1998)

Personal details
- Born: September 26, 1953 (age 73) Wyandotte, Michigan
- Party: Democratic
- Spouse: Aline
- Education: Detroit College of Law (J.D.); Michigan State University

Joseph Palamara (born September 26, 1963) is a current Democratic member of the Wayne County Commission and a former member of the Michigan House of Representatives.

== Education ==
During his undergraduate career at Michigan State University where he was an Evans Scholar, Palamara was a walk-on member of the baseball team. He led the Spartans in hitting in his senior year, won the team's Sportsmanship Award, and was All-Big Ten and All-America at second base. Palamara received his Juris Doctor in 1985 from the Detroit College of Law.

== Philanthropic Work ==
Palamara is a former member of the Board of Directors for the Henry Ford Wyandotte Hospital and a former member of the Aerotropolis Executive Board.
