= Richard D. Allen =

American politician (1938–2009)

Member of the Michigan House of Representatives from the 84th district 77th District (1983-1992)
- In office January 1, 1983 – December 31, 1994
- Preceded by: Keith Muxlow
- Succeeded by: Mike Green

Personal details
- Born: March 7, 1938 Caro, Michigan, U.S.
- Died: June 20, 2009 (aged 71) Saginaw, Michigan, U.S.
- Party: Republican

Military service
- Allegiance: United States
- Branch/service: United States Marine Corps; United States Air Force

Richard D. Allen (March 7, 1938 – June 20, 2009) was a Republican member of the Michigan House of Representatives from 1983 to 1994 representing the Thumb.

Prior to his election to the House, Allen was a newspaper editor and reporter for nearly 20 years. He was also a charter member of the Help Line crisis intervention program and worked with the Tuscola County Community Mental Health Services Board.

== Early life and education ==
Allen graduated from Caro High School in 1957. Following graduation, he enlisted in the U.S. Marine Corps with. After service with the Marine Corps, he enlisted in the U.S. Air Force, and was discharged in 1964.
