= Richard Bandstra =

American judge and politician

The Honorable Richard A. Bandstra

Judge of the Michigan Court of Appeals in the Third District
- In office January 1, 1995 – January 2011
- Succeeded by: Mark Boonstra

Member of the Michigan House of Representatives from the 75th district 93rd District (1985-1992)
- In office 1985 – December 31, 1994
- Preceded by: Vern Ehlers
- Succeeded by: William Byl

Personal details
- Born: April 2, 1950 (age 76) Chicago, Illinois, US
- Spouse: Cynthia
- Education: University of Chicago (J.D.); University of Chicago (M.A.); Calvin College (B.A.)

Richard A. Bandstra is a former member of the Michigan House of Representatives and a judge on the Michigan Court of Appeals.

== Career ==
Formerly an attorney in private practice with the prestigious Warner, Norcross and Judd law firm, Bandstra was elected as a MI State Representative for the Grand Rapids area in 1985. He served through 1994 and was the Republican Co-Floor Leader after the 1992 election resulted in an equally split House, with 55 members from each party.

Bandstra was elected to the Court of Appeals in 1994, serving through his retirement in January 2010. He was Chief Judge of the Court from 1998 through 2001. While on the bench, Bandstra travelled extensively in Slovakia, working on a project to develop legislation pertaining to independence for judges in the newly freed country.

== Charitable work ==
Bandstra volunteered from 2013 to 2017 as the executive director of the Association for a More Just Society, a Christian organization working with a sister organization in Honduras, seeking to assure better government services and just policies for the poor and powerless in that country.
