= Thomas Alley =

American politician (born 1946)

The Honorable Thomas C. Alley

Member of the Michigan House of Representatives
- In office January 1, 1979 – December 31, 1998
- Preceded by: George Prescott
- Succeeded by: Dale Sheltrown
- Constituency: 105th district (1979–1992); 103rd district (1993–1998)

Personal details
- Born: February 19, 1946 (age 80) Bay City, Michigan, U.S.
- Party: Democratic

Thomas C. Alley (born February 19, 1946) is a Democratic politician from Michigan who served for two decades in the Michigan House of Representatives from the northern part of the state. He was an unsuccessful candidate for the Michigan Senate in 1998.

A longtime Democratic activist, Alley was chairman of the Ogemaw County Democratic Party from 1974 to 1977, a member of the Michigan Democratic State Central Committee in 1975 and 1976, a delegate to both the 1976 and 1984 Democratic National Conventions, and a worker on the campaigns of Don Riegle for U.S. Senate in 1976, Sander Levin for governor in 1974, and a county coordinator for Attorney General Frank J. Kelley in 1974. Prior to his election to the House, Alley was a teacher for 10 years.
