= Lewis N. Dodak =

American politician

63rd Speaker of the Michigan House of Representatives
- In office January 11, 1989 – December 31, 1992
- Governor: James J. Blanchard; John Engler
- Preceded by: Gary Owen
- Succeeded by: Curtis Hertel

Member of the Michigan House of Representatives from the 86th district
- In office January 1, 1977 – December 31, 1992
- Preceded by: Donald J. Albosta
- Succeeded by: Alan Cropsey

Personal details
- Born: April 12, 1946 (age 80) Saginaw County, Michigan
- Party: Democratic

Military service
- Allegiance: United States
- Years of service: 1966–1967

Lewis Norman Dodak (born April 12, 1946) is a lobbyist and former member of the Michigan House of Representatives who served as its Speaker from 1989 to 1992.

Dodak has been granted three honorary doctorates: two of law from Saginaw Valley State University and Michigan Technological University and one of public affairs from Northern Michigan University. With fellow former Speaker Rick Johnson, Dodak is a partner at the firm Dodak Johnson and Associates.

== See also ==
- List of Michigan state legislatures
