= 1974 Michigan House of Representatives election =

- November 5, 1974

All 110 seats in the Michigan House of Representatives 56 seats needed for a majority
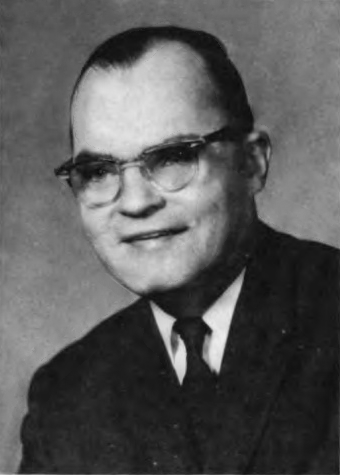

	Majority party	Minority party
Leader	William A. Ryan	Clifford H. Smart (retired)
Party	Democratic	Republican
Leader since	1967	1971
Leader's seat	14th district	24th district
Last election	60	50
Seats before	59	50
Seats after	66	44
Seat change	▲7	▼6
Popular vote	1,409,047	956,726
Percentage	59.22%	40.21%
Speaker before election
William A. Ryan
Democratic
Elected Speaker
Bobby Crim
Democratic

An election was held on November 5, 1974, to elect all 110 members of the Michigan House of Representatives for the 78th Michigan Legislature. In the election, the Democrats increased their majority in the chamber to 66–44 over the Republicans.

== History ==
In the 1972 general election, the Democrats retained control, increasing their majority to 60–50 over the Republicans. In June 1974, Republican Colleen House won a special election to replace Democrat J. Bob Traxler, who was elected to Congress. Also in June, Republican Jack Welborn resigned from the state House after being elected to the Michigan Senate. Before the 1974 general election, there was a 59–50 Democratic majority in the state House.

The 1974 state primary was held on August 6. There were four incumbents unseated, two Democrats and two Republicans. Republican John P. Smeekens, who was under investigation by the legislature for fraud, was ousted by Arvid B. Perrin. Republican James S. Farnsworth was defeated by Edgar Fredricks. Democrat William Copeland, chairman of the House Appropriations Committee, was defeated by Jeffrey Padden. Democrat Clifford D. Gary was defeated by Barbara-Rose Collins.

The general election was on November 5. The Democrats gained 7 seats, resulting in an increased 66–44 majority over the Republicans. Three incumbents were unseated, all Republicans. They were Loren D. Anderson, Richard D. Buth, and Warren O'Brien. After the election, Bobby Crim was elected speaker of the state House, succeeding William A. Ryan. The Republicans elected Dennis O. Cawthorne as minority leader.

The state House was sworn in on January 8, 1975.

== Results ==
The following are the official results as printed in the 1975–1976 Michigan Manual.

=== Statewide ===
Party	Candi- dates	Votes		Seats		
Party	Candi- dates	No.	%	No.	+/–	%
Democratic Party	109	1,409,047	59.22%	66	▲7	60.00%
Republican Party	93	956,726	40.21%	44	▼6	40.00%
American Independent Party	19	6,561	0.27%	0	Steady	0.00%
Human Rights Party	7	5,536	0.23%	0	Steady	0.00%
U.S. Labor Party	7	641	0.02%	0	Steady	0.00%
Socialist Workers Party	3	377	0.01%	0	Steady	0.00%
Write-ins		181	0.00%	0	Steady	0.00%
Total	238	2,379,069	100.00%	110	Steady	100.00%

=== By district ===
1st District (Wayne County)
Party	Candidate	Votes	%
Democratic	Josephine D. Hunsinger (incumbent)	12,858	55.53
Republican	Robert C. Law	10,294	44.46
Total votes		23,152	100.0
Democratic hold			

2nd District (Wayne County)
Party	Candidate	Votes	%
Democratic	Jack E. Legel	13,329	67.72
Republican	Robert G. Uhl	6,352	32.27
Total votes		19,681	100.0
Democratic hold			

3rd District (Wayne County)
Party	Candidate	Votes	%
Democratic	Casmer P. Ogonowski (incumbent)	17,643	82.67
Republican	Thomas E. Klunzinger	3,659	17.14
U.S. Labor	Armand Koloian	38	0.17
Total votes		21,340	100.0
Democratic hold			

4th District (Wayne County)
Party	Candidate	Votes	%
Democratic	George Cushingberry Jr.	16,240	99.04
Socialist Workers	Linda Slodki	104	0.63
U.S. Labor	Gerald A. Zahler	52	0.31
Total votes		16,396	100.0
Democratic hold			

5th District (Wayne County)
Party	Candidate	Votes	%
Democratic	George F. Montgomery Sr. (incumbent)	13,576	100.0
Total votes		13,576	100.0
Democratic hold			

6th District (Wayne County)
Party	Candidate	Votes	%
Democratic	Morris Hood Jr. (incumbent)	14,305	100.0
Total votes		14,305	100.0
Democratic hold			

7th District (Wayne County)
Party	Candidate	Votes	%
Democratic	Raymond W. Hood (incumbent)	15,101	98.57
Socialist Workers	Dean Denno	219	1.42
Total votes		15,320	100.0
Democratic hold			

8th District (Wayne County)
Party	Candidate	Votes	%
Democratic	Daisy Elliott (incumbent)	13,392	100.0
Total votes		13,392	100.0
Democratic hold			

9th District (Wayne County)
Party	Candidate	Votes	%
Democratic	George H. Edwards (incumbent)	12,640	97.02
U.S. Labor	Miriam Olshansky	388	2.97
Total votes		13,028	100.0
Democratic hold			

10th District (Wayne County)
Party	Candidate	Votes	%
Democratic	Michael Novak (incumbent)	17,018	100.0
Total votes		17,018	100.0
Democratic hold			

11th District (Wayne County)
Party	Candidate	Votes	%
Democratic	Thaddeus C. Stopczynski (incumbent)	21,418	100.0
Total votes		21,418	100.0
Democratic hold			

12th District (Wayne County)
Party	Candidate	Votes	%
Democratic	Dennis Hertel	15,036	100.0
Total votes		15,036	100.0
Democratic hold			

13th District (Wayne County)
Party	Candidate	Votes	%
Republican	William R. Bryant Jr. (incumbent)	20,598	74.22
Democratic	Charles E. Cahill	7,154	25.77
Total votes		27,752	100.0
Republican hold			

14th District (Wayne County)
Party	Candidate	Votes	%
Democratic	William A. Ryan (incumbent)	9,695	77.91
Republican	Raymond Eberhart	2,748	22.08
Total votes		12,443	100.0
Democratic hold			

15th District (Wayne County)
Party	Candidate	Votes	%
Democratic	Joseph F. Young (incumbent)	12,039	96.45
Republican	Kenneth R. Hites	443	3.54
Total votes		12,482	100.0
Democratic hold			

16th District (Wayne County)
Party	Candidate	Votes	%
Democratic	Matthew McNeely (incumbent)	13,634	100.0
Total votes		13,634	100.0
Democratic hold			

17th District (Wayne County)
Party	Candidate	Votes	%
Democratic	Frank V. Wierzbicki (incumbent)	10,490	84.25
Republican	Caroline Mack	1,636	13.14
American Independent	Ismael Garza	240	1.92
Socialist Workers	Shannon Measaw	54	0.43
U.S. Labor	Stuart Elliott Bernsen	30	0.24
Total votes		12,450	100.0
Democratic hold			

18th District (Wayne County)
Party	Candidate	Votes	%
Democratic	Jackie Vaughn III (incumbent)	14,141	96.13
Republican	Minervia Arnold	537	3.65
U.S. Labor	Khushro Ghandi	32	0.21
Total votes		14,710	100.0
Democratic hold			

19th District (Wayne County)
Party	Candidate	Votes	%
Democratic	Stephen Stopczynski (incumbent)	14,927	89.50
Republican	William V. Sawicki	1,750	10.49
Total votes		16,677	100.0
Democratic hold			

20th District (Wayne County)
Party	Candidate	Votes	%
Democratic	Rosetta A. Ferguson (incumbent)	11,213	82.01
Republican	John S. Cleland	2,459	17.98
Total votes		13,672	100.0
Democratic hold			

21st District (Wayne County)
Party	Candidate	Votes	%
Democratic	Barbara-Rose Collins	8,188	83.08
Republican	Tom Dwyer	1,475	14.96
American Independent	Nina Hubbard	152	1.54
U.S. Labor	Doniphan Mullins	40	0.40
Total votes		9,855	100.0
Democratic hold			

22nd District (Washtenaw County, Wayne County)
Party	Candidate	Votes	%
Democratic	Gary Owen (incumbent)	14,370	72.90
Republican	Lee West	5,129	26.02
American Independent	Lynn R. Horrocks	211	1.07
Total votes		19,710	100.0
Democratic hold			

23rd District (Ingham County, Jackson County, Washtenaw County)
Party	Candidate	Votes	%
Republican	Michael H. Conlin	14,947	58.86
Democratic	Earle H. Stevenson	9,767	38.46
American Independent	Norman Brehob	674	2.65
Write-in		2	0.00
Total votes		25,390	100.0
Republican hold			

24th District (Oakland County)
Party	Candidate	Votes	%
Republican	Richard D. Fessler	12,806	52.26
Democratic	William D. Brinker	11,697	47.73
Total votes		24,503	100.0
Republican hold			

25th District (Macomb County)
Party	Candidate	Votes	%
Democratic	Dennis Dutko	14,528	65.73
Republican	Warren O'Brien (incumbent)	7,574	34.26
Total votes		22,102	100.0
Democratic gain from Republican			

26th District (Macomb County, St. Clair County)
Party	Candidate	Votes	%
Republican	Kirby Holmes (incumbent)	12,539	54.48
Democratic	George Safie	10,473	45.51
Total votes		23,012	100.0
Republican hold			

27th District (Wayne County)
Party	Candidate	Votes	%
Democratic	Jeffrey Padden	12,164	97.31
American Independent	Burton L. Wintenburg	335	2.68
Total votes		12,499	100.0
Democratic hold			

28th District (Wayne County)
Party	Candidate	Votes	%
Democratic	Thomas J. Anderson (incumbent)	15,361	78.92
Republican	William G. Levan Sr.	3,763	19.33
American Independent	Rose-Ann Papp	340	1.74
Total votes		19,464	100.0
Democratic hold			

29th District (Wayne County)
Party	Candidate	Votes	%
Democratic	Alfred A. Sheridan (incumbent)	14,802	77.51
Republican	Arthur William Habitz Jr.	4,293	22.48
Total votes		19,095	100.0
Democratic hold			

30th District (Wayne County)
Party	Candidate	Votes	%
Democratic	Joyce Symons (incumbent)	19,484	77.56
Republican	Lee Kefauver	5,634	22.43
Total votes		25,118	100.0
Democratic hold			

31st District (Wayne County)
Party	Candidate	Votes	%
Democratic	Lucille H. McCollough (incumbent)	21,880	73.87
Republican	Nancy Olson	7,738	26.12
Total votes		29,618	100.0
Democratic hold			

32nd District (Wayne County)
Party	Candidate	Votes	%
Democratic	Richard A. Young (incumbent)	15,107	72.89
Republican	Dorothy E. Evans	5,617	27.10
Total votes		20,724	100.0
Democratic hold			

33rd District (Wayne County)
Party	Candidate	Votes	%
Democratic	William R. Keith (incumbent)	12,385	82.44
Republican	Lavaughn Wethington	2,637	17.55
Total votes		15,022	100.0
Democratic hold			

34th District (Wayne County)
Party	Candidate	Votes	%
Democratic	John Bennett (incumbent)	19,138	100.0
Total votes		19,138	100.0
Democratic hold			

35th District (Wayne County)
Party	Candidate	Votes	%
Republican	R. Robert Geake (incumbent)	13,538	58.26
Democratic	R. William Joyner	9,699	41.73
Total votes		23,237	100.0
Republican hold			

36th District (Wayne County)
Party	Candidate	Votes	%
Democratic	John F. Markes (incumbent)	13,860	68.07
Republican	Ralph M. Miller	6,336	31.11
American Independent	Howard L. Neal	164	0.80
Total votes		20,360	100.0
Democratic hold			

37th District (Wayne County)
Party	Candidate	Votes	%
Democratic	Thomas H. Brown (incumbent)	13,175	71.27
Republican	Brian C. Kidston	5,309	28.72
Total votes		18,484	100.0
Democratic hold			

38th District (Monroe County, Wayne County)
Party	Candidate	Votes	%
Democratic	Edward E. Mahalak (incumbent)	12,967	70.38
Republican	Elbert Ray	5,217	28.31
American Independent	Jeanette Mino	238	1.29
Total votes		18,422	100.0
Democratic hold			

39th District (Monroe County)
Party	Candidate	Votes	%
Democratic	Raymond C. Kehres (incumbent)	14,738	99.98
Write-in		2	0.01
Total votes		14,740	100.0
Democratic hold			

40th District (Hillsdale County, Lenawee County)
Party	Candidate	Votes	%
Republican	John S. Mowat Jr. (incumbent)	11,461	55.89
Democratic	Ernest H. Oliver	9,042	44.10
Total votes		20,503	100.0
Republican hold			

41st District (Branch County, Hillsdale County, Lenawee County, St. Joseph County)
Party	Candidate	Votes	%
Democratic	Paul Porter	10,835	51.38
Republican	Arvid Brooks Perrin	10,245	48.58
Write-in		6	0.02
Total votes		21,086	100.0
Democratic gain from Republican			

42nd District (Cass County, St. Joseph County, Van Buren County)
Party	Candidate	Votes	%
Republican	DeForrest Strang (incumbent)	11,321	54.36
Democratic	Laurence S. McBride	9,501	45.62
Write-in		3	0.01
Total votes		20,825	100.0
Republican hold			

43rd District (Berrien County)
Party	Candidate	Votes	%
Republican	Harry Gast (incumbent)	15,501	66.65
Democratic	Ervin R. Appelget	7,755	33.34
Total votes		23,256	100.0
Republican hold			

44th District (Berrien County, Cass County)
Party	Candidate	Votes	%
Republican	Ray C. Mittan (incumbent) (Note: There was a recount held in the 44th district in January 1975. The recount affirmed Ray C. Mittan's victory.)	9,000	49.80
Democratic	Charles F. Henderson	8,861	49.03
American Independent	Irma Collier	210	1.162
Total votes		18,071	100.0
Republican hold			

45th District (Allegan County, Barry County, Berrien County, Van Buren County)
Party	Candidate	Votes	%
Republican	Bela E. Kennedy (incumbent)	12,149	56.11
Democratic	James E. McCaw	9,035	41.73
American Independent	Paul Shek	466	2.15
Total votes		21,650	100.0
Republican hold			

46th District (Kalamazoo County)
Party	Candidate	Votes	%
Democratic	Howard Wolpe (incumbent)	11,101	65.31
Republican	William N. Thompson	5,896	34.68
Total votes		16,997	100.0
Democratic hold			

47th District (Kalamazoo County)
Party	Candidate	Votes	%
Republican	Robert A. Welborn	15,920	61.26
Democratic	John A. Lilly	9,948	38.28
Human Rights	Kenneth R. Hunt	116	0.44
Write-in		1	0.00
Total votes		25,985	100.0
Republican hold			

48th District (Calhoun County)
Party	Candidate	Votes	%
Democratic	Paul A. Rosenbaum (incumbent)	15,974	75.41
Republican	Paul M. Schoder	5,204	24.56
Write-in		3	0.01
Total votes		21,181	100.0
Democratic hold			

49th District (Calhoun County, Jackson County)
Party	Candidate	Votes	%
Republican	Dan Angel (incumbent)	14,995	63.04
Democratic	Bruce A. Bennett	8,789	36.95
Total votes		23,784	100.0
Republican hold			

50th District (Jackson County)
Party	Candidate	Votes	%
Democratic	Michael J. Griffin (incumbent)	14,246	70.85
Republican	Joseph S. Filip	5,860	29.14
Total votes		20,106	100.0
Democratic hold			

51st District (Ingham County, Livingston County)
Party	Candidate	Votes	%
Republican	Thomas G. Sharpe (incumbent)	15,485	57.32
Democratic	John H. McDermott Sr.	11,274	41.73
Human Rights	Ronald Rogers	255	0.94
Write-in		1	0.00
Total votes		27,015	100.0
Republican hold			

52nd District (Monroe County, Washtenaw County, Wayne County)
Party	Candidate	Votes	%
Republican	Roy Smith	14,268	58.53
Democratic	Merian Frederick	9,833	40.33
American Independent	Keith C. Pratt	275	1.12
Total votes		24,376	100.0
Republican hold			

53rd District (Washtenaw County)
Party	Candidate	Votes	%
Democratic	Perry Bullard (incumbent)	12,946	46.36
Republican	Rae C. Weaver	12,163	43.56
Human Rights	Robert D. Alexander	2,598	9.30
American Independent	Ronald L. Graham	213	0.76
Total votes		27,920	100.0
Democratic hold			

54th District (Allegan County, Ottawa County, Van Buren County)
Party	Candidate	Votes	%
Republican	Edgar Fredricks	17,307	67.28
Democratic	Samuel E. Greydanus Jr.	8,415	32.71
Total votes		25,722	100.0
Republican hold			

55th District (Allegan County, Barry County, Kalamazoo County)
Party	Candidate	Votes	%
Republican	Wayne B. Sackett (incumbent)	14,064	55.97
Democratic	Warren W. Wayne	11,061	44.02
Write-in		2	0.00
Total votes		25,127	100.0
Republican hold			

56th District (Clinton County, Eaton County, Ionia County)
Party	Candidate	Votes	%
Republican	Ernest W. Nash	13,558	51.89
Democratic	Denis Noah	12,566	48.10
Total votes		26,124	100.0
Republican hold			

57th District (Ingham County)
Party	Candidate	Votes	%
Democratic	David Hollister	13,557	63.92
Republican	Richard Lee Covert	6,905	32.55
Human Rights	Donnell McClain	747	3.52
Total votes		21,209	100.0
Democratic hold			

58th District (Eaton County, Ingham County)
Party	Candidate	Votes	%
Democratic	Thomas M. Holcomb	16,337	57.59
Republican	John T. Anas	11,455	40.38
Human Rights	Demetrio Saenz	570	2.00
Write-in		5	0.01
Total votes		28,367	100.0
Democratic gain from Republican			

59th District (Ingham County)
Party	Candidate	Votes	%
Democratic	H. Lynn Jondahl (incumbent)	21,145	64.99
Republican	Catherine A. Lessard	10,349	31.81
Human Rights	Carroll J. Hawkins	1,037	3.18
Total votes		32,531	100.0
Democratic hold			

60th District (Oakland County)
Party	Candidate	Votes	%
Democratic	Claude A. Trim	12,152	52.33
Republican	Loren D. Anderson (incumbent)	11,068	47.66
Total votes		23,220	100.0
Democratic gain from Republican			

61st District (Oakland County)
Party	Candidate	Votes	%
Republican	Melvin L. Larsen (incumbent)	10,881	57.77
Democratic	Donald R. Taylor	7,951	42.22
Total votes		18,832	100.0
Republican hold			

62nd District (Oakland County)
Party	Candidate	Votes	%
Democratic	Charlie J. Harrison Jr. (incumbent)	9,072	53.95
Republican	James Briney	7,682	45.68
U.S. Labor	Vernon Michael Higgins	61	0.36
Total votes		16,815	100.0
Democratic hold			

63rd District (Oakland County)
Party	Candidate	Votes	%
Republican	Ruth McNamee	18,878	69.80
Democratic	Chris M. Altemann	7,901	29.21
American Independent	Robert M. Groat	261	0.96
Write-in		2	0.00
Total votes		27,042	100.0
Republican hold			

64th District (Oakland County)
Party	Candidate	Votes	%
Republican	Wilbur Brotherton	14,870	59.83
Democratic	John P. Campbell	9,981	40.16
Write-in		1	0.00
Total votes		24,852	100.0
Republican hold			

65th District (Oakland County)
Party	Candidate	Votes	%
Republican	James E. Defebaugh (incumbent)	23,017	73.19
Democratic	Dorothes Becker	8,430	26.80
Write-in		1	0.00
Total votes		31,448	100.0
Republican hold			

66th District (Oakland County)
Party	Candidate	Votes	%
Democratic	Monte Geralds	12,183	59.74
Republican	Shirley M. Gast	8,209	40.25
Total votes		20,392	100.0
Democratic hold			

67th District (Oakland County)
Party	Candidate	Votes	%
Democratic	Joseph Forbes (incumbent)	21,226	76.68
Republican	Lynne Jackson	6,453	23.31
Write-in		1	0.00
Total votes		27,680	100.0
Democratic hold			

68th District (Oakland County)
Party	Candidate	Votes	%
Republican	William Hayward (incumbent)	12,869	53.47
Democratic	Ronald C. VanAllen	11,040	45.87
American Independent	Carl Cory	158	0.65
Total votes		24,067	100.0
Republican hold			

69th District (Oakland County)
Party	Candidate	Votes	%
Democratic	Philip Mastin (incumbent)	15,937	70.11
Republican	James Edward Lanni	6,793	29.88
Total votes		22,730	100.0
Democratic hold			

70th District (Macomb County)
Party	Candidate	Votes	%
Democratic	John T. Kelsey (incumbent)	14,299	99.25
Write-in		107	0.74
Total votes		14,406	100.0
Democratic hold			

71st District (Macomb County, Oakland County)
Party	Candidate	Votes	%
Democratic	Sal Rocca	16,172	60.94
Republican	Joseph W. Werner	10,359	39.04
Write-in		3	0.01
Total votes		26,534	100.0
Democratic hold			

72nd District (Macomb County)
Party	Candidate	Votes	%
Democratic	Warren N. Goemaere (incumbent)	14,118	77.94
Republican	J. Edward Wyszynski	3,994	22.05
Total votes		18,112	100.0
Democratic hold			

73rd District (Macomb County)
Party	Candidate	Votes	%
Democratic	Gilbert DiNello (incumbent)	15,139	76.48
Republican	William B. Krebaum	4,655	23.51
Total votes		19,794	100.0
Democratic hold			

74th District (Macomb County)
Party	Candidate	Votes	%
Democratic	John M. Maynard	14,683	68.84
Republican	Johannes J. VanDeGraaf	6,642	31.14
Write-in		2	0.00
Total votes		21,327	100.0
Democratic hold			

75th District (Macomb County)
Party	Candidate	Votes	%
Democratic	David Bonior (incumbent)	15,363	99.98
Write-in		3	0.01
Total votes		15,366	100.0
Democratic hold			

76th District (St. Clair County)
Party	Candidate	Votes	%
Republican	William Jowett (incumbent)	12,319	55.84
Democratic	Peter A. Martindale	9,487	43.00
American Independent	Wendall James Alexander	253	1.14
Total votes		22,059	100.0
Republican hold			

77th District (Huron County, Lapeer County, St. Clair County, Sanilac County)
Party	Candidate	Votes	%
Republican	Quincy P. Hoffman (incumbent)	16,001	62.52
Democratic	Keith D. Rothfuss	9,590	37.47
Write-in		1	0.00
Total votes		25,592	100.0
Republican hold			

78th District (Lapeer County, Macomb County, St. Clair County)
Party	Candidate	Votes	%
Republican	Roy L. Spencer (incumbent)	11,044	48.87
Democratic	Larry E. Burkhalter	10,761	47.61
American Independent	George C. Johns II	793	3.50
Total votes		22,598	100.0
Republican hold			

79th District (Genesee County)
Party	Candidate	Votes	%
Republican	F. Robert Edwards (incumbent)	10,348	51.84
Democratic	Edwin L. Knopf	9,611	48.15
Total votes		19,959	100.0
Republican hold			

80th District (Genesee County)
Party	Candidate	Votes	%
Democratic	Harold Joseph Scott (incumbent)	13,664	86.34
Republican	Willie C. Wheaton	2,161	13.65
Total votes		15,825	100.0
Democratic hold			

81st District (Genesee County)
Party	Candidate	Votes	%
Democratic	Mark Clodfelter	13,591	70.30
Republican	Robert W. Busha	5,527	28.59
Human Rights	John Lord	213	1.10
Total votes		19,331	100.0
Democratic hold			

82nd District (Genesee County)
Party	Candidate	Votes	%
Democratic	Bobby Crim (incumbent)	14,832	74.42
Republican	Delbert W. Snyder	5,098	25.57
Total votes		19,930	100.0
Democratic hold			

83rd District (Genesee County)
Party	Candidate	Votes	%
Republican	James F. Smith (incumbent) (Note: There was a recount held in the 83rd district in January 1975. The official results printed in the Michigan Manual show James F. Smith with 13,641 and Paul E. Trecha with 13,547 votes. The recount found 10 more votes for Trecha and 3 for Smith. This resulted in 13,644 votes for Smith and 13,557 votes for Trecha. The recount affirmed Smith's victory.)	13,641	50.17
Democratic	Paul E. Trecha	13,547	49.82
Total votes		27,188	100.0
Republican hold			

84th District (Genesee County, Saginaw County, Tuscola County)
Party	Candidate	Votes	%
Republican	Loren S. Armbruster (incumbent)	13,566	58.30
Democratic	Allen J. Bailey	9,703	41.69
Total votes		23,269	100.0
Republican hold			

85th District (Saginaw County)
Party	Candidate	Votes	%
Democratic	James E. O'Neill Jr. (incumbent)	14,474	70.86
Republican	Kathryn A. Rood	5,952	29.13
Total votes		20,426	100.0
Democratic hold			

86th District (Bay County, Saginaw County)
Party	Candidate	Votes	%
Democratic	Donald J. Albosta	14,431	68.09
Republican	Nelson W. Lash	6,762	31.90
Total votes		21,193	100.0
Democratic gain from Republican			

87th District (Clinton County, Genesee County, Shiawassee County)
Party	Candidate	Votes	%
Democratic	Francis R. Spaniola	16,003	62.11
Republican	James P. Capitan	9,760	37.88
Total votes		25,763	100.0
Democratic gain from Republican			

88th District (Clinton County, Gratiot County, Ionia County, Montcalm County, Shiawassee County)
Party	Candidate	Votes	%
Republican	Stanley M. Powell (incumbent)	12,959	55.56
Democratic	Donald L. Stanton	10,363	44.43
Write-in		2	0.00
Total votes		23,324	100.0
Republican hold			

89th District (Clare County, Gratiot County, Isabella County, Montcalm County)
Party	Candidate	Votes	%
Republican	John Engler (incumbent)	11,427	53.86
Democratic	James A. Dickinson	9,785	46.12
Write-in		1	0.00
Total votes		21,213	100.0
Republican hold			

90th District (Kent County)
Party	Candidate	Votes	%
Republican	Martin Buth (incumbent)	16,810	63.76
Democratic	Loren Pitsch	9,553	36.23
Total votes		26,363	100.0
Republican hold			

91st District (Kent County)
Party	Candidate	Votes	%
Republican	Peter Kok (incumbent)	24,622	73.41
Democratic	David Abraham	8,918	26.58
Total votes		33,540	100.0
Republican hold			

92nd District (Kent County)
Party	Candidate	Votes	%
Democratic	Thomas C. Mathieu	15,010	54.06
Republican	Richard D. Buth (incumbent)	12,406	44.68
American Independent	Louis William Eberbach	346	1.24
Total votes		27,762	100.0
Democratic gain from Republican			

93rd District (Kent County)
Party	Candidate	Votes	%
Democratic	Stephen V. Monsma	13,123	67.12
Republican	Thomas Knol	5,739	29.35
American Independent	Raymond F. Barr	687	3.51
Write-in		1	0.00
Total votes		19,550	100.0
Democratic hold			

94th District (Kent County)
Party	Candidate	Votes	%
Democratic	Jelt Sietsema (incumbent)	13,395	61.19
Republican	Willis H. Snow	8,495	38.80
Total votes		21,890	100.0
Democratic hold			

95th District (Kent County, Ottawa County)
Party	Candidate	Votes	%
Republican	Melvin DeStigter (incumbent)	19,320	66.05
Democratic	Stephen E. Fawley	9,929	33.94
Total votes		29,249	100.0
Republican hold			

96th District (Muskegon County)
Party	Candidate	Votes	%
Democratic	Gerrit C. Hasper (incumbent)	15,528	71.35
Republican	Leon D. Nobes	6,233	28.64
Write-in		1	0.00
Total votes		21,762	100.0
Democratic hold			

97th District (Muskegon County, Ottawa County)
Party	Candidate	Votes	%
Republican	Edgar A. Geerlings (incumbent)	13,507	52.86
Democratic	Martin L. Hulka	12,041	47.12
Write-in		2	0.00
Total votes		25,550	100.0
Republican hold			

98th District (Lake County, Manistee County, Mason County, Muskegon County, Oceana County, Wexford County)
Party	Candidate	Votes	%
Republican	Dennis O. Cawthorne (incumbent)	17,817	61.49
Democratic	Bruce E. Burgoyne	11,153	38.49
Write-in		1	0.00
Total votes		28,971	100.0
Republican hold			

99th District (Isabella County, Mecosta County, Montcalm County, Newaygo County, Osceola County)
Party	Candidate	Votes	%
Republican	Donald Van Singel (incumbent)	14,644	60.56
Democratic	Louis C. Russell	9,534	39.43
Total votes		24,178	100.0
Republican hold			

100th District (Gratiot County, Saginaw County)
Party	Candidate	Votes	%
Republican	J. Michael Busch	16,163	62.32
Democratic	Gregory J. Kershul	9,772	37.67
Total votes		25,935	100.0
Republican hold			

101st District (Bay County)
Party	Candidate	Votes	%
Republican	Colleen House (incumbent)	15,186	58.77
Democratic	Fred Voisine	10,650	41.22
Total votes		25,836	100.0
Republican hold			

102nd District (Bay County, Midland County)
Party	Candidate	Votes	%
Republican	Louis K. Cramton (incumbent)	16,486	100.0
Total votes		16,486	100.0
Republican hold			

103rd District (Antrim County, Charlevoix County, Clare County, Crawford County, Grand Traverse County, Isabella County, Kalkaska County, Missaukee County, Osceola County, Roscommon County)
Party	Candidate	Votes	%
Republican	Ralph Ostling (incumbent)	18,977	58.81
Democratic	James M. Miller	13,267	41.11
Write-in		23	0.07
Total votes		32,267	100.0
Republican hold			

104th District (Benzie County, Grand Traverse County, Leelanau County, Manistee County, Wexford County)
Party	Candidate	Votes	%
Republican	Connie Binsfeld	15,764	52.52
Democratic	William S. Gregory	14,247	47.47
Total votes		30,011	100.0
Republican hold			

105th District (Alcona County, Arenac County, Bay County, Gladwin County, Iosco County, Midland County, Montmorency County, Ogemaw County, Oscoda County, Roscommon County)
Party	Candidate	Votes	%
Republican	George Prescott (incumbent)	13,366	52.18
Democratic	Patrick G. Flynn	12,249	47.81
Total votes		25,615	100.0
Republican hold			

106th District (Alpena County, Antrim County, Charlevoix County, Cheboygan County, Montmorency County, Otsego County, Presque Isle County)
Party	Candidate	Votes	%
Republican	E. Dan Stevens	14,317	50.21
Democratic	Fay Lee	13,649	47.87
American Independent	Louis A. Leblanc	545	1.91
Total votes		28,511	100.0
Republican hold			

107th District (Alger County, Cheboygan County, Chippewa County, Delta County, Emmet County, Luce County, Mackinac County, Schoolcraft County)
Party	Candidate	Votes	%
Republican	Charles H. Varnum (incumbent)	15,034	56.89
Democratic	Glenn W. Law Jr.	11,391	43.10
Total votes		26,425	100.0
Republican hold			

108th District (Alger County, Baraga County, Houghton County, Iron County, Marquette County)
Party	Candidate	Votes	%
Democratic	Dominic Jacobetti (incumbent)	18,270	99.98
Write-in		2	0.01
Total votes		18,272	100.0
Democratic hold			

109th District (Alger County, Delta County, Dickinson County, Marquette County, Menominee County)
Party	Candidate	Votes	%
Democratic	Jack Gingrass (incumbent)	17,858	62.37
Republican	Charles Donaldson	10,771	37.62
Total votes		28,629	100.0
Democratic hold			

110th District (Baraga County, Gogebic County, Houghton County, Iron County, Keweenaw County, Ontonagon County)
Party	Candidate	Votes	%
Democratic	Russell Hellman (incumbent)	22,168	99.99
Write-in		2	0.00
Total votes		22,170	100.0
Democratic hold			

=== Special election ===
A special election was held in the 47th district on November 5, 1974, alongside the general election. A special election for the state Senate was held on June 25, 1974, to fill the vacancy left by Anthony Stamm. Republican State Rep. Jack Welborn was elected to fill the vacancy, causing him to resign from the state House.

In August, Governor William Milliken called for a special election to fill the state House. He called for a special primary on September 10, and for the special general to be held on November 5. There was ultimately no primary held because each party had only one candidate for the special election.

The special election was won by Republican Robert A. Welborn, Jack Welborn's brother. He was sworn in on November 19.

The following are the official results as printed in the 1975–1976 Michigan Manual.

47th District special election (Kalamazoo County)
Party	Candidate	Votes	%
Republican	Robert A. Welborn	15,222	60.50
Democratic	John A. Lilly	9,938	39.49
Total votes		25,160	100.0
Republican hold			

== See also ==
- 1974 Michigan Senate election
