= 1972 Michigan House of Representatives election =

- November 7, 1972

All 110 seats in the Michigan House of Representatives 56 seats needed for a majority
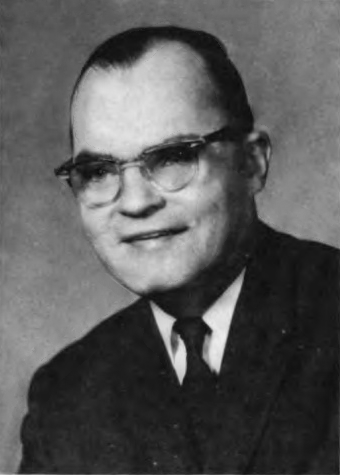

	Majority party	Minority party
Leader	William A. Ryan	Clifford H. Smart
Party	Democratic	Republican
Leader since	1967	1971
Leader's seat	3rd district	60th district
Last election	58	52
Seats after	60	50
Seat change	▲2	▼2
Popular vote	1,589,460	1,544,956
Percentage	50.30%	48.89%
Speaker before election
William A. Ryan
Democratic
Elected Speaker
William A. Ryan
Democratic

An election was held on November 7, 1972, to elect all 110 members of the Michigan House of Representatives for the 77th Michigan Legislature. In the election, the Democrats won a 60–50 majority, over the Republicans, maintaining control of the chamber.

== History ==
In the 1970 general election, the Democrats won a 58–52 majority over the Republicans, maintaining control of the chamber.

The 1972 state primary was held on August 8. Four incumbents retired, and five sought higher office. There were 13 incumbents defeated in the primary, 9 Democrats and 4 Republicans. It was the first election following redistricting, causing some incumbents to be ousted by other incumbents. The ousted Republicans were Thomas G. Ford, Richard J. Allen, James H. Heinze, and Richard Friske. The ousted Democrats were Leonard Walton, Robert Mahoney, Theodore Mrozowski, E. D. O'Brien, Nelis J. Saunders, Edward Suski, Alex Pilch, Harold Clark, and Arthur J. Law. Law, after losing the primary, ran a write-in for re-election.

The general election was held on November 7. The Democrats increased their majority to 60–50, maintaining their control. Republican incumbents Roy Smith and Gustave J. Groat Sr. were defeated. Incumbent Democrats Stanley J. Davis and Theodore P. Mansour were also defeated. Mansour was the only one defeated by a fellow incumbent in the general, Republican F. Robert Edwards.

After the election, the Democrats re-elected William A. Ryan as speaker of the state House. Republicans re-elected Clifford H. Smart as minority leader.

== Results ==
The following are the official results as printed in the 1973–1974 Michigan Manual. The official results purposefully excluded scattered write-in votes.

=== Statewide ===
Party	Candi- dates	Votes (Note: In the official results of several districts, the vote total printed does not equal the sum of the votes of the listed candidates. This is true in the following districts: 15th, 23rd, 38th, 40th, 41st, 44th, 45th, 54th, 55th, 56th, 58th, 71st, 88th, 89th, 97th, 103rd, 104th, 107th, 109th, and 110th.)		Seats		
Party	Candi- dates	No.	%	No.	+/–	%
Democratic Party	108	1,589,460	50.30%	60	▲2	54.54%
Republican Party	105	1,544,956	48.89%	50	▼2	45.45%
American Independent Party	25	12,860	0.40%	0	Steady	0.00%
Human Rights Party	2	9,471	0.29%	0	Steady	0.00%
Write-ins	1	2,883	0.09%	0	Steady	0.00%
Conservative Party	3	1,284	0.04%	0	Steady	0.00%
Total	244	3,159,899	100.00%	110	Steady	100.00%

=== By district ===
1st District (Wayne County)
Party	Candidate	Votes	%
Democratic	Josephine D. Hunsinger (incumbent)	19,809	65.91
Republican	Anthony Romeo	9,892	32.91
American Independent	Jeannette Mino	352	1.17
Total votes		30,053	100.0

2nd District (Wayne County)
Party	Candidate	Votes	%
Democratic	William M. Brodhead (incumbent)	19,876	65.28
Republican	Anthony DeLorenzo	10,568	34.71
Total votes		30,444	100.0

3rd District (Wayne County)
Party	Candidate	Votes	%
Democratic	Casmer P. Ogonowski (incumbent)	18,271	68.42
Republican	Mary Singer	8,433	31.57
Total votes		26,704	100.0

4th District (Wayne County)
Party	Candidate	Votes	%
Democratic	Alma G. Stallworth (incumbent)	25,981	100.0
Total votes		25,981	100.0

5th District (Wayne County)
Party	Candidate	Votes	%
Democratic	George F. Montgomery Sr.	20,316	89.51
Republican	Charles H. Coon Jr.	2,379	10.48
Total votes		22,695	100.0

6th District (Wayne County)
Party	Candidate	Votes	%
Democratic	Morris Hood Jr. (incumbent)	19,041	80.76
Republican	Herman L. Keppner	4,535	19.23
Total votes		23,576	100.0

7th District (Wayne County)
Party	Candidate	Votes	%
Democratic	Raymond W. Hood (incumbent)	21,012	83.44
Republican	Otto A. Willis	4,169	16.55
Total votes		25,181	100.0

8th District (Wayne County)
Party	Candidate	Votes	%
Democratic	Daisy Elliott (incumbent)	20,762	97.34
Republican	Markus S. Simon	567	2.65
Total votes		21,329	100.0

9th District (Wayne County)
Party	Candidate	Votes	%
Democratic	George H. Edwards (incumbent)	18,739	88.00
Republican	Irmah Zampty	2,553	11.99
Total votes		21,292	100.0

10th District (Wayne County)
Party	Candidate	Votes	%
Democratic	Michael Novak (incumbent)	20,934	84.32
Republican	Walter Czarnecki	3,892	15.67
Total votes		24,826	100.0

11th District (Wayne County)
Party	Candidate	Votes	%
Democratic	Thaddeus Stopczynski	20,778	67.53
Republican	Ross C. Christie Sr.	9,988	32.46
Total votes		30,766	100.0

12th District (Wayne County)
Party	Candidate	Votes	%
Democratic	William B. Fitzgerald Jr. (incumbent)	18,008	66.13
Republican	Gordon R. Michaelson	9,220	33.86
Total votes		27,228	100.0

13th District (Wayne County)
Party	Candidate	Votes	%
Republican	William R. Bryant Jr. (incumbent)	28,151	73.27
Democratic	George J. Verdonckt	9,978	25.97
American Independent	Richard E. Maxwell	290	0.75
Total votes		38,419	100.0

14th District (Wayne County)
Party	Candidate	Votes	%
Democratic	William A. Ryan (incumbent)	14,166	71.77
Republican	Robert H. Robson	5,572	28.22
Total votes		19,738	100.0

15th District (Wayne County)
Party	Candidate	Votes	%
Democratic	James Bradley (incumbent)	19,105	101.23
Republican	Barbara Warren	856	4.53
Total votes		18,871	100.0

16th District (Wayne County)
Party	Candidate	Votes	%
Democratic	Matthew McNeely (incumbent)	18,155	84.26
Republican	Stanley Richard Tucker	3,126	14.50
American Independent	Earlean Moon	264	1.22
Total votes		21,545	100.0

17th District (Wayne County)
Party	Candidate	Votes	%
Democratic	Frank V. Wierzbicki (incumbent)	14,080	77.46
Republican	Edward J. Mack	3,754	20.65
American Independent	Glenna M. Garza	342	1.88
Total votes		18,176	100.0

18th District (Wayne County)
Party	Candidate	Votes	%
Democratic	Jackie Vaughn III (incumbent)	21,217	100.0
Total votes		21,217	100.0

19th District (Wayne County)
Party	Candidate	Votes	%
Democratic	Stephen Stopczynski (incumbent)	19,565	83.44
Republican	Dennis T. Wojnar	3,882	16.55
Total votes		23,447	100.0

20th District (Wayne County)
Party	Candidate	Votes	%
Democratic	Rosetta A. Ferguson (incumbent)	16,686	80.63
Republican	Martha S. Williams	4,006	19.36
Total votes		20,692	100.0

21st District (Wayne County)
Party	Candidate	Votes	%
Democratic	David S. Holmes Jr. (incumbent)	14,386	86.28
Republican	Jessie M. Ransom	2,286	13.71
Total votes		16,672	100.0

22nd District (Washtenaw County, Wayne County)
Party	Candidate	Votes	%
Democratic	Gary Owen	14,058	50.83
Republican	Roy Smith (incumbent)	13,260	47.94
American Independent	Robert E. Cauley	338	1.22
Total votes		27,656	100.0

23rd District (Ingham County, Jackson County, Washtenaw County)
Party	Candidate	Votes	%
Republican	Hal Ziegler (incumbent)	20,411	64.67
Democratic	Florence Beier	11,146	35.31
Total votes		31,558	100.0

24th District (Oakland County)
Party	Candidate	Votes	%
Republican	Clifford H. Smart (incumbent)	21,802	71.10
Democratic	William J. Kabzinski	8,858	28.89
Total votes		30,660	100.0

25th District (Macomb County)
Party	Candidate	Votes	%
Republican	Warren O'Brien	13,710	52.43
Democratic	Thomas C. Miller	12,164	46.51
American Independent	Hugh M. Davidson	274	1.04
Total votes		26,148	100.0

26th District (Macomb County, St. Clair County)
Party	Candidate	Votes	%
Republican	Kirby Holmes	15,804	58.81
Democratic	Byron E. Nichols	11,067	41.18
Total votes		26,871	100.0

27th District (Wayne County)
Party	Candidate	Votes	%
Democratic	William R. Copeland (incumbent)	17,597	59.87
Republican	Dallas S. Kelsey Jr.	11,384	38.73
American Independent	Thomas A. Mason	411	1.39
Total votes		29,392	100.0

28th District (Wayne County)
Party	Candidate	Votes	%
Democratic	Thomas J. Anderson (incumbent)	16,613	63.30
Republican	William George Le Van Sr.	9,169	34.94
American Independent	Frank F. Papp	460	1.75
Total votes		26,242	100.0

29th District (Wayne County)
Party	Candidate	Votes	%
Democratic	Alfred A. Sheridan (incumbent)	16,410	63.28
Republican	Robert Hawks	9,519	36.71
Total votes		25,929	100.0

30th District (Wayne County)
Party	Candidate	Votes	%
Democratic	Joyce Symons (incumbent)	21,709	67.64
Republican	Wanda Gray Harrison	10,385	32.35
Total votes		32,094	100.0

31st District (Wayne County)
Party	Candidate	Votes	%
Democratic	Lucille H. McCollough (incumbent)	25,453	65.41
Republican	Victoria L. Toensing	12,989	33.38
American Independent	Gladys F. Purcell	469	1.20
Total votes		38,911	100.0

32nd District (Wayne County)
Party	Candidate	Votes	%
Democratic	Richard A. Young (incumbent)	17,179	62.76
Republican	Richard E. Waldecker	10,193	37.23
Total votes		27,372	100.0

33rd District (Wayne County)
Party	Candidate	Votes	%
Democratic	William R. Keith	15,798	69.42
Republican	Dorman Smith	6,958	30.57
Total votes		22,756	100.0

34th District (Wayne County)
Party	Candidate	Votes	%
Democratic	John Bennett (incumbent)	21,564	64.17
Republican	Cornelius J. Clifford	11,330	33.72
American Independent	Frank Hanna Jr.	706	2.10
Total votes		33,600	100.0

35th District (Wayne County)
Party	Candidate	Votes	%
Republican	R. Robert Geake	16,907	59.77
Democratic	Marie E. Miller	11,376	40.22
Total votes		28,283	100.0

36th District (Wayne County)
Party	Candidate	Votes	%
Democratic	John F. Markes	13,548	49.93
Republican	Ralph M. Miller	13,311	49.06
American Independent	Norman L. Szewc	272	1.00
Total votes		27,131	100.0

37th District (Wayne County)
Party	Candidate	Votes	%
Democratic	Thomas H. Brown (incumbent)	14,540	58.93
Republican	Jack A. Underwood	9,800	39.72
American Independent	Thurman B. Conway	332	1.34
Total votes		24,672	100.0

38th District (Monroe County, Wayne County)
Party	Candidate	Votes	%
Democratic	Edward E. Mahalak (incumbent)	13,448	57.31
Republican	Joanne B. Elliot	10,014	42.67
Total votes		23,463	100.0

39th District (Monroe County)
Party	Candidate	Votes	%
Democratic	Raymond C. Kehres (incumbent)	17,744	100.0
Total votes		17,744	100.0

40th District (Hillsdale County, Lenawee County)
Party	Candidate	Votes	%
Republican	John S. Mowat Jr. (incumbent)	18,741	99.93
Total votes		18,753	100.0

41st District (Branch County, Hillsdale County, Lenawee County, St. Joseph County)
Party	Candidate	Votes	%
Republican	John P. Smeekens (incumbent)	18,815	67.60
Democratic	Orville E. Meyer	9,011	32.37
Total votes		27,830	100.0

42nd District (Cass County, St. Joseph County, Van Buren County)
Party	Candidate	Votes	%
Republican	DeForrest Strang (incumbent)	18,297	64.29
Democratic	Stuart Conchran	10,163	35.70
Total votes		28,460	100.0

43rd District (Berrien County)
Party	Candidate	Votes	%
Republican	Harry Gast (incumbent)	24,617	75.39
Democratic	Laurel P. Groenke	7,169	21.95
American Independent	Karl Friske	864	2.64
Total votes		32,650	100.0

44th District (Berrien County, Cass County)
Party	Candidate	Votes	%
Republican	Ray C. Mittan (incumbent)	14,488	56.16
Democratic	David R. McCormack	11,305	43.82
Total votes		25,795	100.0

45th District (Allegan County, Barry County, Berrien County, Van Buren County)
Party	Candidate	Votes	%
Republican	Bela E. Kennedy (incumbent)	18,803	66.07
Democratic	Bruce Longhead	9,220	32.40
American Independent	Robert C. Drenkhahn	431	1.51
Total votes		28,455	100.0

46th District (Kalamazoo County)
Party	Candidate	Votes	%
Democratic	Howard Wolpe	17,261	58.50
Republican	Norman Bruex	12,240	41.49
Total votes		29,501	100.0

47th District (Kalamazoo County)
Party	Candidate	Votes	%
Republican	John A. Welborn	24,549	68.64
Democratic	Roger A. Bennett Sr.	11,215	31.35
Total votes		35,764	100.0

48th District (Calhoun County)
Party	Candidate	Votes	%
Democratic	Paul A. Rosenbaum	15,647	51.95
Republican	Gustave J. Groat Sr. (incumbent)	14,470	48.04
Total votes		30,117	100.0

49th District (Calhoun County, Jackson County)
Party	Candidate	Votes	%
Republican	Dan Angel	21,296	70.62
Democratic	Orville W. Greve	8,859	29.37
Total votes		30,155	100.0

50th District (Jackson County)
Party	Candidate	Votes	%
Democratic	Michael J. Griffin	13,585	51.08
Republican	Frederick O. Sill	13,010	48.91
Total votes		26,595	100.0

51st District (Ingham County, Livingston County)
Party	Candidate	Votes	%
Republican	Thomas G. Sharpe (incumbent)	21,658	68.65
Democratic	Hans H. Haugard	9,886	31.34
Total votes		31,544	100.0

52nd District (Monroe County, Washtenaw County, Wayne County)
Party	Candidate	Votes	%
Republican	Raymond J. Smit (incumbent)	21,366	65.81
Democratic	Robert E. Dwyer	11,098	34.18
Total votes		32,464	100.0

53rd District (Washtenaw County)
Party	Candidate	Votes	%
Democratic	Perry Bullard	18,957	45.60
Republican	Michael J. Renner	13,939	33.53
Human Rights	Stephen Burghardt	8,405	20.22
Conservative	Alan Howard Harris	265	0.63
Total votes		41,566	100.0

54th District (Allegan County, Ottawa County, Van Buren County)
Party	Candidate	Votes	%
Republican	James S. Farnsworth (incumbent)	25,586	76.38
Democratic	David A. Blok	7,907	23.60
Total votes		33,494	100.0

55th District (Allegan County, Barry County, Kalamazoo County)
Party	Candidate	Votes	%
Republican	Wayne B. Sackett (incumbent)	19,770	63.63
Democratic	Warren W. Wayne	11,299	36.36
Total votes		31,070	100.0

56th District (Clinton County, Eaton County, Ionia County)
Party	Candidate	Votes	%
Republican	Dale Warner (incumbent)	21,192	66.42
Democratic	John P. Huhn	10,710	33.56
Total votes		31,904	100.0

57th District (Ingham County)
Party	Candidate	Votes	%
Democratic	Earl E. Nelson (incumbent)	17,660	59.08
Republican	Robert Michael Smart	12,231	40.91
Total votes		29,891	100.0

58th District (Eaton County, Ingham County)
Party	Candidate	Votes	%
Republican	Frederick L. Stackable (Note: A recount was held in the 109th district in January 1973. It affirmed Frederick L. Stackable's victory.) (incumbent)	17,335	48.61
Democratic	Thomas M. Holcomb	17,259	48.39
Human Rights	James F. McClure Jr.	1,066	2.98
Total votes		35,661	100.0

59th District (Ingham County)
Party	Candidate	Votes	%
Democratic	H. Lynn Jondahl	23,648	54.27
Republican	James A. Pocock	19,924	45.72
Total votes		43,572	100.0

60th District (Oakland County)
Party	Candidate	Votes	%
Republican	Loren D. Anderson (incumbent)	18,662	67.09
Democratic	Ronald H. Farnum	9,152	32.90
Total votes		27,814	100.0

61st District (Oakland County)
Party	Candidate	Votes	%
Republican	Melvin L. Larsen	13,681	56.78
Democratic	Kerry Kenneth Kammer	10,410	43.21
Total votes		24,091	100.0

62nd District (Oakland County)
Party	Candidate	Votes	%
Democratic	Charlie J. Harrison Jr. (Note: A recount was held in the 62nd district in January 1973. It affirmed Charlie J. Harrison's victory.)	10,292	44.32
Republican	James W. Briney Jr.	10,043	43.25
Write-In	Arthur J. Law (incumbent)	2,883	12.41
Total votes		23,218	100.0

63rd District (Oakland County)
Party	Candidate	Votes	%
Republican	James Damman (incumbent)	26,508	73.27
Democratic	John L. Lane	9,669	26.72
Total votes		36,177	100.0

64th District (Oakland County)
Party	Candidate	Votes	%
Republican	Raymond L. Baker (incumbent)	19,944	63.18
Democratic	John P. Campbell	10,728	33.98
Conservative	John J. Riley	892	2.82
Total votes		31,564	100.0

65th District (Oakland County)
Party	Candidate	Votes	%
Republican	James E. Defebaugh (incumbent)	30,801	79.33
Democratic	Harry M. Moss	8,021	20.66
Total votes		38,822	100.0

66th District (Oakland County)
Party	Candidate	Votes	%
Democratic	Bill Huffman (incumbent)	14,709	52.57
Republican	Ronald K. Cunningham	13,270	47.42
Total votes		27,979	100.0

67th District (Oakland County)
Party	Candidate	Votes	%
Democratic	Joseph Forbes (incumbent)	22,437	65.21
Republican	Harry Kirsch	11,966	34.78
Total votes		34,403	100.0

68th District (Oakland County)
Party	Candidate	Votes	%
Republican	William Hayward (incumbent)	19,551	59.24
Democratic	Roy J. Daniel	13,447	40.75
Total votes		32,998	100.0

69th District (Oakland County)
Party	Candidate	Votes	%
Democratic	Philip Mastin (incumbent)	16,901	57.22
Republican	Donald Wm. Sargent	12,507	42.34
Conservative	Fred E. Wilson	127	0.42
Total votes		29,535	100.0

70th District (Macomb County)
Party	Candidate	Votes	%
Democratic	John T. Kelsey (incumbent)	14,994	100.0
Total votes		14,994	100.0

71st District (Macomb County, Oakland County)
Party	Candidate	Votes	%
Democratic	Thomas Guastello (incumbent)	17,076	53.59
Republican	Elvio Rosati	14,783	46.39
Total votes		31,863	100.0

72nd District (Macomb County)
Party	Candidate	Votes	%
Democratic	Warren N. Goemaere (incumbent)	14,839	62.75
Republican	J. Edward Wyszynski Jr.	8,807	37.24
Total votes		23,646	100.0

73rd District (Macomb County)
Party	Candidate	Votes	%
Democratic	Gilbert DiNello	14,227	100.0
Total votes		14,227	100.0

74th District (Macomb County)
Party	Candidate	Votes	%
Democratic	Joseph M. Snyder (incumbent)	14,992	50.25
Republican	Gene William Heck	14,837	49.74
Total votes		29,829	100.0

75th District (Macomb County)
Party	Candidate	Votes	%
Democratic	David Bonior	14,405	53.45
Republican	Ed De Whitt	12,545	46.54
Total votes		26,950	100.0

76th District (St. Clair County)
Party	Candidate	Votes	%
Republican	William L. Jowett (incumbent)	17,626	63.36
Democratic	James F. Gerrits	10,190	36.63
Total votes		27,816	100.0

77th District (Huron County, Lapeer County, St. Clair County, Sanilac County)
Party	Candidate	Votes	%
Republican	Quincy P. Hoffman (incumbent)	22,984	71.97
Democratic	Harold L. Richards	8,575	26.85
American Independent	Lyle J. Macklem	373	1.16
Total votes		31,932	100.0

78th District (Lapeer County, Macomb County, St. Clair County)
Party	Candidate	Votes	%
Republican	Roy I. Spencer (incumbent)	17,075	64.32
Democratic	William R. Francisco	9,471	35.67
Total votes		26,546	100.0

79th District (Genesee County)
Party	Candidate	Votes	%
Republican	F. Robert Edwards (incumbent)	15,850	54.46
Democratic	Theodore P. Mansour (incumbent)	13,249	45.53
Total votes		29,099	100.0

80th District (Genesee County)
Party	Candidate	Votes	%
Democratic	Harold J. Scott	19,381	79.19
Republican	Willie C. Wheaton	5,092	20.80
Total votes		24,473	100.0

81st District (Genesee County)
Party	Candidate	Votes	%
Democratic	Dale Kildee (incumbent)	20,700	74.20
Republican	Carol Lee Burrow	7,194	25.79
Total votes		27,894	100.0

82nd District (Genesee County)
Party	Candidate	Votes	%
Democratic	Bobby Crim	17,898	69.52
Republican	James P. Frazier	7,845	30.47
Total votes		25,743	100.0

83rd District (Genesee County)
Party	Candidate	Votes	%
Republican	James F. Smith (incumbent)	20,145	61.08
Democratic	Paul E. Trecha	12,831	38.91
Total votes		32,976	100.0

84th District (Genesee County, Saginaw County, Tuscola County)
Party	Candidate	Votes	%
Republican	Loren S. Armbruster	16,927	60.01
Democratic	Ernst C. Heine	11,277	39.98
Total votes		28,204	100.0

85th District (Saginaw County)
Party	Candidate	Votes	%
Democratic	James E. O'Neill Jr. (incumbent)	16,904	66.10
Republican	Kenneth Arthur Botwright	8,667	33.89
Total votes		25,571	100.0

86th District (Bay County, Saginaw County)
Party	Candidate	Votes	%
Republican	Robert D. Young (incumbent)	14,559	55.85
Democratic	James L. Gaertner	11,190	42.92
American Independent	Robert E. Davis Jr.	317	1.21
Total votes		26,066	100.0

87th District (Clinton County, Genesee County, Shiawassee County)
Party	Candidate	Votes	%
Republican	R. Douglas Trezise (incumbent)	17,052	53.40
Democratic	Francis R. Spaniola	14,876	46.59
Total votes		31,928	100.0

88th District (Clinton County, Gratiot County, Ionia County, Montcalm County, Shiawassee County)
Party	Candidate	Votes	%
Republican	Stanley M. Powell (incumbent)	19,235	66.27
Democratic	Kenneth M. Somers	9,487	32.68
American Independent	Dale F. Calder	302	1.04
Total votes		29,025	100.0

89th District (Clare County, Gratiot County, Isabella County, Montcalm County)
Party	Candidate	Votes	%
Republican	John Engler (incumbent)	18,342	62.19
Democratic	William Joyner	11,147	37.79
Total votes		29,491	100.0

90th District (Kent County)
Party	Candidate	Votes	%
Republican	Martin Buth (incumbent)	21,476	67.58
Democratic	Robert Ties Walter	9,610	30.24
American Independent	Jack E. Smith	690	2.17
Total votes		31,776	100.0

91st District (Kent County)
Party	Candidate	Votes	%
Republican	Peter Kok (incumbent)	31,998	76.40
Democratic	David Abraham	9,884	23.59
Total votes		41,882	100.0

92nd District (Kent County)
Party	Candidate	Votes	%
Republican	Richard D. Buth	17,129	51.71
Democratic	Stanley J. Davis (incumbent)	15,994	48.28
Total votes		33,123	100.0

93rd District (Kent County)
Party	Candidate	Votes	%
Democratic	John R. Otterbacher	18,014	62.63
Republican	Daniel B. Hess	10,745	37.36
Total votes		28,759	100.0

94th District (Kent County)
Party	Candidate	Votes	%
Democratic	Jelt Sietsema (incumbent)	15,535	53.35
Republican	Jacob G. Haagsman	13,583	46.64
Total votes		29,118	100.0

95th District (Kent County, Ottawa County)
Party	Candidate	Votes	%
Republican	Melvin DeStigter (incumbent)	26,013	73.58
Democratic	Albert J. Russell	9,339	26.41
Total votes		35,352	100.0

96th District (Muskegon County)
Party	Candidate	Votes	%
Democratic	Gerrit C. Hasper (incumbent)	16,442	57.81
Republican	Edward O. Bouwsma	11,312	39.77
American Independent	Richard Anthony Yates	684	2.40
Total votes		28,438	100.0

97th District (Muskegon County, Ottawa County)
Party	Candidate	Votes	%
Republican	Edgar A. Geerlings (incumbent)	20,989	99.96
Total votes		20,997	100.0

98th District (Lake County, Manistee County, Mason County, Muskegon County, Oceana County, Wexford County)
Party	Candidate	Votes	%
Republican	Dennis O. Cawthorne (incumbent)	25,599	71.52
Democratic	Lee Trucks	9,862	27.55
American Independent	Joe E. Lance	330	0.92
Total votes		35,791	100.0

99th District (Isabella County, Mecosta County, Montcalm County, Newaygo County, Osceola County)
Party	Candidate	Votes	%
Republican	Donald Van Singel	20,010	65.11
Democratic	Robert E. Neif	10,314	33.56
American Independent	Daniel S. Blanding Jr.	407	1.32
Total votes		30,731	100.0

100th District (Gratiot County, Saginaw County)
Party	Candidate	Votes	%
Republican	Bert C. Brennan (incumbent)	22,641	71.51
Democratic	Dorothy J. Currie	9,019	28.48
Total votes		31,660	100.0

101st District (Bay County)
Party	Candidate	Votes	%
Democratic	J. Bob Traxler (incumbent)	19,570	63.51
Republican	Charles E. Smith	10,711	34.76
American Independent	Mark L. Nelson	532	1.72
Total votes		30,813	100.0

102nd District (Bay County, Midland County)
Party	Candidate	Votes	%
Republican	Louis K. Cramton (incumbent)	20,266	64.63
Democratic	Thomas M. Byron	11,090	35.36
Total votes		31,356	100.0

103rd District (Antrim County, Charlevoix County, Clare County, Crawford County, Grand Traverse County, Isabella County, Kalkaska County, Missaukee County, Osceola County, Roscommon County)
Party	Candidate	Votes	%
Republican	Ralph Ostling	22,780	62.34
Democratic	Charles A. Duerr Jr.	11,126	30.44
American Independent	Herbert Friske	2,631	7.20
Total votes		36,539	100.0

104th District (Benzie County, Grand Traverse County, Leelanau County, Manistee County, Wexford County)
Party	Candidate	Votes	%
Republican	Michael Dively (incumbent)	23,893	68.33
Democratic	Benjamin P. Miltner	11,055	31.61
Total votes		34,966	100.0

105th District (Alcona County, Arenac County, Bay County, Gladwin County, Iosco County, Midland County, Montmorency County, Ogemaw County, Oscoda County, Roscommon County)
Party	Candidate	Votes	%
Republican	George Prescott (incumbent)	19,575	63.72
Democratic	Earl R. Schuster	10,876	35.40
American Independent	Bayard John Cournyer	269	0.87
Total votes		30,720	100.0

106th District (Alpena County, Antrim County, Charlevoix County, Cheboygan County, Montmorency County, Otsego County, Presque Isle County)
Party	Candidate	Votes	%
Republican	Mark L. Thompson	17,748	54.24
Democratic	Russel M. Lee	14,452	44.16
American Independent	Gary D. Graye	520	1.58
Total votes		32,720	100.0

107th District (Alger County, Cheboygan County, Chippewa County, Delta County, Emmet County, Luce County, Mackinac County, Schoolcraft County)
Party	Candidate	Votes	%
Republican	Charles H. Varnum (incumbent)	20,309	63.82
Democratic	Glenn W. Law Jr.	11,504	36.15
Total votes		31,818	100.0

108th District (Alger County, Baraga County, Houghton County, Iron County, Marquette County)
Party	Candidate	Votes	%
Democratic	Dominic Jacobetti (incumbent)	20,520	65.69
Republican	John W. Avery	10,714	34.30
Total votes		31,234	100.0

109th District (Alger County, Delta County, Dickinson County, Marquette County, Menominee County)
Party	Candidate	Votes	%
Democratic	Jack Gingrass (Note: A recount was held in the 109th district in January 1973. It affirmed Jack Gingrass's victory.)	17,339	50.11
Republican	Charles Donaldson	17,255	49.87
Total votes		34,599	100.0

110th District (Baraga County, Gogebic County, Houghton County, Iron County, Keweenaw County, Ontonagon County)
Party	Candidate	Votes	%
Democratic	Russell Hellman (incumbent)	21,444	56.34
Republican	Gerald L. De Motts	16,610	43.64
Total votes		38,058	100.0
