= 1974 Michigan Senate election =

- November 5, 1974

All 38 seats in the Michigan Senate 20 seats needed for a majority

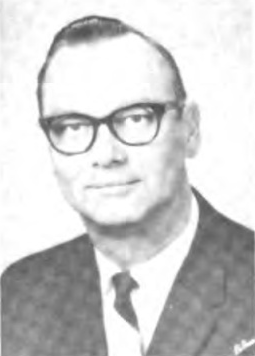
| | Majority party | Minority party |
|---|---|---|
| Leader | George S. Fitzgerald (retired) | Milton Zaagman (unseated) |
| Party | Democratic | Republican |
| Leader since | 1970 | 1974 |
| Leader's seat | 1st district | 32nd district |
| Last election | 19 | 19 |
| Seats before | 18 | 19 |
| Seats after | 24 | 14 |
| Seat change | ▲6 | ▼5 |
| Popular vote | 1,411,763 | 990,154 |
| Percentage | 58.34% | 40.92% |
Majority Leader before election
Milton Zaagman
Republican
Elected Majority Leader
William B. Fitzgerald Jr.
Democratic

An election was held on November 5, 1974, to elect all 38 members of the Michigan Senate for the 78th Michigan Legislature. In the election, the Democrats won a 24–14 majority from what had previously been a Republican controlled chamber.

== History ==
The 1970 general election resulted in an even 19–19 split of Republicans and Democrats in the state Senate. While the Republicans did not have a majority in the chamber, they were able to control it, due to the Republican Lt. Governor James H. Brickley's tie-breaking vote. The death of Republican Anthony Stamm in April 1974 temporarily created a slight Democratic majority, but the death of Democrat Michael J. O'Brien in June returned the chamber to Republican control. O'Brien's vacancy was not filled before the 1974 general election, resulting in a 19–18 Republican majority going into the general.

The 1974 state primary was held on August 6. Three Democratic incumbents were unseated. Garland Lane, dean of the state Senate, was unseated by Dale Kildee. James Gray was unseated by Joseph Snyder. This was the first state Senate election following redistricting, which put two Democratic incumbents, John C. Hertel and Stanley F. Rozycki, into the same district. Hertel defeated Rozycki.

The general election was held on November 5. Five incumbent Republicans were unseated, resulting in a 24–14 Democratic majority in the chamber. Majority Leader Milton Zaagman, defeated by Democrat John Otterbacher, was one of the Republicans unseated. The others were Oscar E. Bouwsma, L. Harvey Lodge, Philip O. Pittenger, and Gordon Rockwell. They were defeated by Democrats Tony A. Derezinski, Kerry Kenneth Kammer, Earl E. Nelson, and Gary G. Corbin, respectively. After the election, William B. Fitzgerald Jr. was elected majority leader, succeeding Democratic leader George S. Fitzgerald. The Republicans chose Bob Davis to serve as minority leader.

The state Senate was sworn in on January 8, 1975.

== Results ==
The following are the official results as printed in the 1975–1976 Michigan Manual.

=== Statewide ===
| Party | Candi- dates | Votes | | Seats | | |
| Party | Candi- dates | No. | % | No. | +/– | % |
|---|---|---|---|---|---|---|
| Democratic Party | 38 | 1,411,763 | 58.34% | 24 | ▲6 | 63.15% |
| Republican Party | 36 | 990,154 | 40.92% | 14 | ▼5 | 36.84% |
| American Independent Party | 10 | 8,994 | 0.37% | 0 | Steady | 0.00% |
| Human Rights Party | 5 | 6,402 | 0.26% | 0 | Steady | 0.00% |
| U.S. Labor Party | 10 | 1,568 | 0.06% | 0 | Steady | 0.00% |
| Socialist Workers Party | 1 | 328 | 0.01% | 0 | Steady | 0.00% |
| Conservative Party | 1 | 219 | 0.00% | 0 | Steady | 0.00% |
| Write-ins | | 50 | 0.00% | 0 | Steady | 0.00% |
| Total | 101 | 2,419,478 | 100.00% | 38 | Steady | 100.00% |

=== By district ===
1st District
| Party | Candidate | Votes | % |
|---|---|---|---|
| Democratic | William B. Fitzgerald Jr. | 33,230 | 69.85 |
| Republican | Earl I. Heenan III | 14,230 | 29.91 |
| U.S. Labor | Jeffrey H. Forrest | 110 | 0.23 |
| Total votes | | 47,570 | 100.0 |

2nd District
| Party | Candidate | Votes | % |
|---|---|---|---|
| Democratic | John C. Hertel (incumbent) | 52,165 | 81.26 |
| Republican | Raymond L. Gorney | 12,023 | 18.73 |
| Total votes | | 64,188 | 100.0 |

3rd District
| Party | Candidate | Votes | % |
|---|---|---|---|
| Democratic | Basil W. Brown (incumbent) | 36,667 | 95.99 |
| American Independent | David Howard | 1,157 | 3.02 |
| U.S. Labor | Craig W. Hunt | 372 | 0.97 |
| Total votes | | 38,196 | 100.0 |

4th District
| Party | Candidate | Votes | % |
|---|---|---|---|
| Democratic | David S. Holmes Jr. (incumbent) | 28,643 | 85.09 |
| Republican | Richard A. Golden | 4,208 | 12.50 |
| American Independent | John K. Daly | 386 | 1.14 |
| Socialist Workers | Sandra Knoll | 328 | 0.97 |
| U.S. Labor | Richard Shannon Magraw | 94 | 0.27 |
| Total votes | | 33,659 | 100.0 |

5th District
| Party | Candidate | Votes | % |
|---|---|---|---|
| Democratic | Arthur Cartwright (incumbent) | 37,692 | 91.93 |
| Republican | Edward Mack | 3,187 | 7.77 |
| U.S. Labor | Kenneth J. Dalto | 118 | 0.28 |
| Total votes | | 40,997 | 100.0 |

6th District
| Party | Candidate | Votes | % |
|---|---|---|---|
| Democratic | Michael J. O'Brien Jr. | 40,199 | 81.85 |
| Republican | Teresa A. Gillis | 8,804 | 17.92 |
| U.S. Labor | Gloria Jock | 105 | 0.21 |
| Total votes | | 49,108 | 100.0 |

7th District
| Party | Candidate | Votes | % |
|---|---|---|---|
| Democratic | Jack Faxon (incumbent) | 46,901 | 80.67 |
| Republican | George C. Stone | 11,008 | 18.93 |
| U.S. Labor | Marsha G. Freeman | 229 | 0.39 |
| Total votes | | 58,138 | 100.0 |

8th District
| Party | Candidate | Votes | % |
|---|---|---|---|
| Republican | Donald E. Bishop (incumbent) | 54,483 | 68.14 |
| Democratic | Donald C. Crawford | 24,430 | 30.55 |
| Human Rights | Sallie H. Eckert | 816 | 1.02 |
| Conservative | Jerry Woodruff | 219 | 0.27 |
| Total votes | | 79,948 | 100.0 |

9th District
| Party | Candidate | Votes | % |
|---|---|---|---|
| Democratic | Thomas Guastello | 37,388 | 51.84 |
| Republican | David M. Serotkin | 33,787 | 46.84 |
| American Independent | Arline Learst | 941 | 1.30 |
| Write-in | | 2 | 0.00 |
| Total votes | | 72,118 | 100.0 |

10th District
| Party | Candidate | Votes | % |
|---|---|---|---|
| Democratic | Patrick H. McCollough (incumbent) | 52,917 | 76.91 |
| Republican | Joyce Hagelthorn | 14,968 | 21.75 |
| American Independent | Gladys F. Purcell | 910 | 1.32 |
| Total votes | | 68,795 | 100.0 |

11th District
| Party | Candidate | Votes | % |
|---|---|---|---|
| Democratic | John E. McCauley (incumbent) | 35,211 | 58.37 |
| Republican | Audrey E. Perry | 24,991 | 41.43 |
| U.S. Labor | Jeffrey Woodward | 113 | 0.18 |
| Write-in | | 1 | 0.00 |
| Total votes | | 60,316 | 100.0 |

12th District
| Party | Candidate | Votes | % |
|---|---|---|---|
| Democratic | David Plawecki (incumbent) | 43,860 | 78.15 |
| Republican | Robert J. Lundh | 12,260 | 21.84 |
| Total votes | | 56,120 | 100.0 |

13th District
| Party | Candidate | Votes | % |
|---|---|---|---|
| Democratic | William Faust (incumbent) | 39,450 | 75.48 |
| Republican | James D. Walaskay | 12,814 | 24.51 |
| Total votes | | 52,264 | 100.0 |

14th District
| Party | Candidate | Votes | % |
|---|---|---|---|
| Republican | Carl Pursell (incumbent) | 42,893 | 62.29 |
| Democratic | Michael K. O'Shea | 25,265 | 36.69 |
| American Independent | Hector M. McGregor | 700 | 1.01 |
| Total votes | | 68,858 | 100.0 |

15th District
| Party | Candidate | Votes | % |
|---|---|---|---|
| Democratic | Daniel S. Cooper (incumbent) | 48,782 | 63.78 |
| Republican | Lee A. Coppock | 27,690 | 36.20 |
| Write-in | | 2 | 0.00 |
| Total votes | | 76,474 | 100.0 |

16th District
| Party | Candidate | Votes | % |
|---|---|---|---|
| Democratic | Bill Huffman | 36,796 | 57.62 |
| Republican | Robert Lincoln Dondero | 27,058 | 42.37 |
| Write-in | | 2 | 0.00 |
| Total votes | | 63,856 | 100.0 |

17th District
| Party | Candidate | Votes | % |
|---|---|---|---|
| Democratic | Kerry Kenneth Kammer | 36,728 | 63.72 |
| Republican | L. Harvey Lodge (incumbent) | 20,754 | 36.00 |
| U.S. Labor | Christopher L. Martinson | 153 | 0.26 |
| Write-in | | 1 | 0.00 |
| Total votes | | 57,636 | 100.0 |

18th District
| Party | Candidate | Votes | % |
|---|---|---|---|
| Republican | Gilbert E. Bursley (incumbent) | 37,959 | 52.33 |
| Democratic | Peter Eckstein | 32,129 | 44.29 |
| Human Rights | Lisa R. North | 2,386 | 3.28 |
| U.S. Labor | Theodore D. Held | 53 | 0.07 |
| Total votes | | 72,527 | 100.0 |

19th District
| Party | Candidate | Votes | % |
|---|---|---|---|
| Republican | Hal Ziegler | 31,640 | 50.60 |
| Democratic | Kirk L. Curtis | 30,873 | 49.38 |
| Write-in | | 8 | 0.01 |
| Total votes | | 62,521 | 100.0 |

20th District
| Party | Candidate | Votes | % |
|---|---|---|---|
| Republican | Harry A. DeMaso (incumbent) | 39,484 | 62.09 |
| Democratic | John D. Brattin | 24,098 | 37.89 |
| Write-in | | 5 | 0.00 |
| Total votes | | 63,587 | 100.0 |

21st District
| Party | Candidate | Votes | % |
|---|---|---|---|
| Republican | John A. Welborn | 35,783 | 55.62 |
| Democratic | Mary C. Brown | 28,220 | 43.86 |
| Human Rights | James E. Zerbi | 328 | 0.50 |
| Total votes | | 64,331 | 100.0 |

22nd District
| Party | Candidate | Votes | % |
|---|---|---|---|
| Republican | Charles Zollar (incumbent) | 34,067 | 55.32 |
| Democratic | Richard Grabemeyer | 26,315 | 42.73 |
| American Independent | Karl Friske | 1,191 | 1.93 |
| Write-in | | 2 | 0.00 |
| Total votes | | 61,575 | 100.0 |

23rd District
| Party | Candidate | Votes | % |
|---|---|---|---|
| Republican | Gary Byker (incumbent) | 48,758 | 64.57 |
| Democratic | Bernard Allen | 26,744 | 35.42 |
| Write-in | | 1 | 0.00 |
| Total votes | | 75,503 | 100.0 |

24th District
| Party | Candidate | Votes | % |
|---|---|---|---|
| Democratic | Earl E. Nelson | 46,189 | 58.56 |
| Republican | Philip O. Pittenger (incumbent) | 30,219 | 38.31 |
| Human Rights | John B. Fishbeck | 2,463 | 3.12 |
| Write-in | | 2 | 0.00 |
| Total votes | | 78,873 | 100.0 |

25th District
| Party | Candidate | Votes | % |
|---|---|---|---|
| Democratic | Gary G. Corbin | 39,200 | 62.47 |
| Republican | Gordon Rockwell (incumbent) | 23,320 | 37.16 |
| U.S. Labor | Donald George Wirtanen | 221 | 0.35 |
| Total votes | | 62,741 | 100.0 |

26th District
| Party | Candidate | Votes | % |
|---|---|---|---|
| Democratic | Joseph M. Snyder | 40,161 | 68.63 |
| Republican | Robert L. Schultz | 17,726 | 30.29 |
| American Independent | Faith A. Wolski | 623 | 1.06 |
| Write-in | | 2 | 0.00 |
| Total votes | | 58,512 | 100.0 |

27th District
| Party | Candidate | Votes | % |
|---|---|---|---|
| Democratic | John T. Bowman (incumbent) | 39,168 | 73.71 |
| Republican | Thomas Dale Regal | 13,965 | 26.28 |
| Write-in | | 4 | 0.00 |
| Total votes | | 53,137 | 100.0 |

28th District
| Party | Candidate | Votes | % |
|---|---|---|---|
| Republican | Alvin J. DeGrow (incumbent) | 37,421 | 56.04 |
| Democratic | Harold L. Richards | 28,337 | 42.44 |
| American Independent | Carlton Werth | 1,007 | 1.50 |
| Total votes | | 66,765 | 100.0 |

29th District
| Party | Candidate | Votes | % |
|---|---|---|---|
| Democratic | Dale Kildee | 45,542 | 74.67 |
| Republican | James R. Johnson | 15,441 | 25.32 |
| Total votes | | 60,983 | 100.0 |

30th District
| Party | Candidate | Votes | % |
|---|---|---|---|
| Republican | Richard J. Allen | 35,845 | 51.83 |
| Democratic | Richard D. Warren | 32,894 | 47.56 |
| Human Rights | Edward W. Aho | 409 | 0.59 |
| Write-in | | 4 | 0.00 |
| Total votes | | 69,152 | 100.0 |

31st District
| Party | Candidate | Votes | % |
|---|---|---|---|
| Republican | Robert VanderLaan (incumbent) | 53,332 | 66.22 |
| Democratic | Robert D. Fahey | 26,032 | 32.32 |
| American Independent | Daniel S. Blanding Jr. | 1,164 | 1.44 |
| Total votes | | 80,528 | 100.0 |

32nd District
| Party | Candidate | Votes | % |
|---|---|---|---|
| Democratic | John Otterbacher | 41,137 | 61.19 |
| Republican | Milton Zaagman (incumbent) | 26,085 | 38.80 |
| Total votes | | 67,222 | 100.0 |

33rd District
| Party | Candidate | Votes | % |
|---|---|---|---|
| Democratic | Tony A. Derezinski | 48,033 | 63.77 |
| Republican | Oscar E. Bouwsma (incumbent) | 26,357 | 34.99 |
| American Independent | Ronald E. Pesch | 915 | 1.21 |
| Write-in | | 8 | 0.01 |
| Total votes | | 75,313 | 100.0 |

34th District
| Party | Candidate | Votes | % |
|---|---|---|---|
| Democratic | Jerome T. Hart (incumbent) | 47,153 | 100.0 |
| Total votes | | 47,153 | 100.0 |

35th District
| Party | Candidate | Votes | % |
|---|---|---|---|
| Republican | Robert D. Young | 46,457 | 60.53 |
| Democratic | Dorothy J. Currie | 30,285 | 39.46 |
| Write-in | | 1 | 0.00 |
| Total votes | | 76,743 | 100.0 |

36th District
| Party | Candidate | Votes | % |
|---|---|---|---|
| Republican | John Toepp (incumbent) | 44,233 | 59.32 |
| Democratic | Mack Thomson | 30,325 | 40.67 |
| Total votes | | 74,558 | 100.0 |

37th District
| Party | Candidate | Votes | % |
|---|---|---|---|
| Republican | Bob Davis (incumbent) | 40,937 | 50.78 |
| Democratic | Prentiss M. Brown Jr. | 39,667 | 49.21 |
| Write-in | | 1 | 0.00 |
| Total votes | | 80,605 | 100.0 |

38th District
| Party | Candidate | Votes | % |
|---|---|---|---|
| Democratic | Joseph Mack (incumbent) | 52,937 | 67.08 |
| Republican | Mel Taylor | 25,967 | 32.90 |
| Write-in | | 4 | 0.00 |
| Total votes | | 78,908 | 100.0 |

=== Special election ===
There was a special election held alongside the general election on November 5, 1974. Democrat Michael J. O'Brien died on June 6, 1974. On July 29, Governor William Milliken called for a special election to fill the vacancy. The special primary was to be held on September 10, and the special general to be held on November 5. No special primary election was held.

O'Brien's son, Michael J. O'Brien Jr., won the special election to serve the partial term. He also won a full term as state senator. He was sworn in on November 19.

The following are the official results as printed in the 1975–1976 Michigan Manual.

8th District special election
| Party | Candidate | Votes | % |
|---|---|---|---|
| Democratic | Michael J. O'Brien Jr. | 32,213 | 80.97 |
| Republican | Teresa A. Gillis | 7,568 | 19.02 |
| Total votes | | 39,781 | 100.0 |

== See also ==
- 1974 Michigan House of Representatives election
