= 1980 Republican National Convention =

Political convention of the Republican Party

- 1980 presidential election

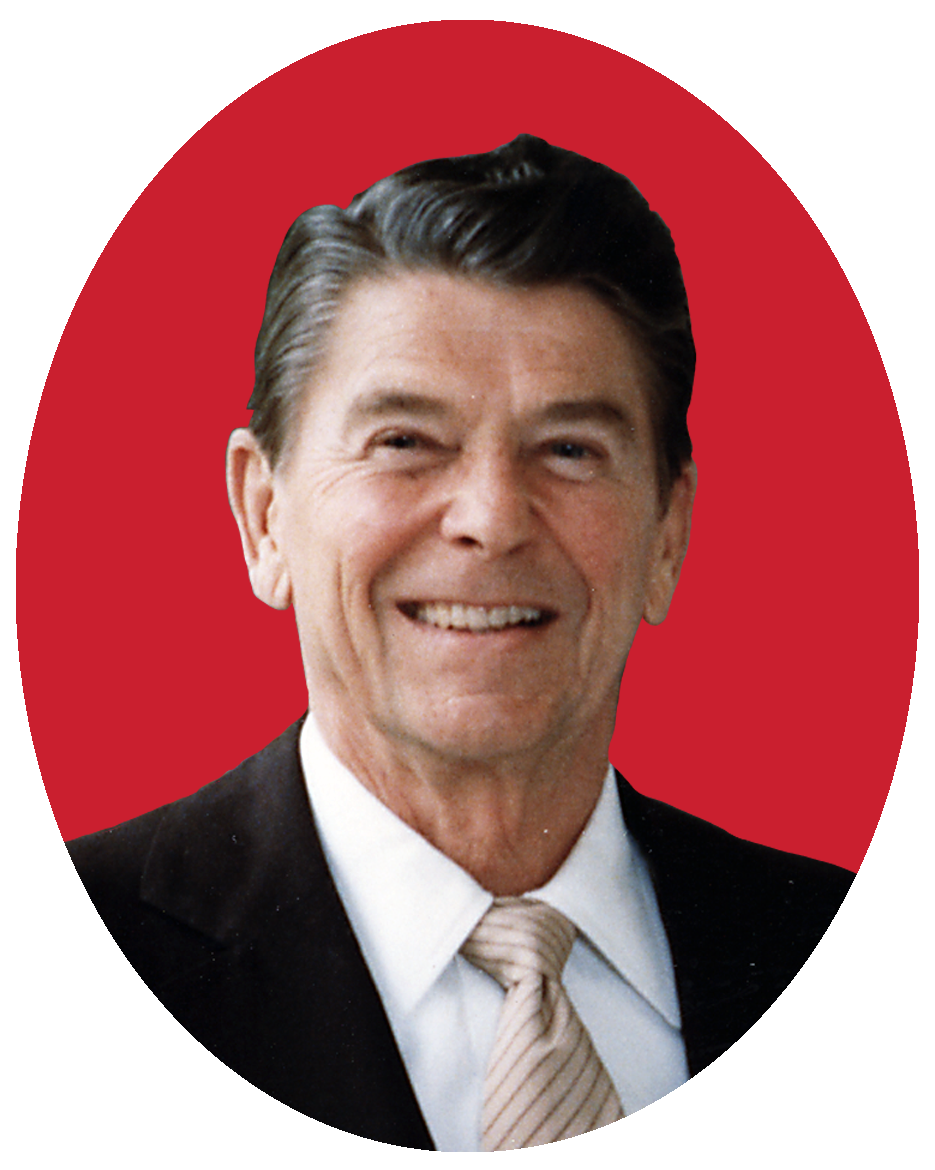
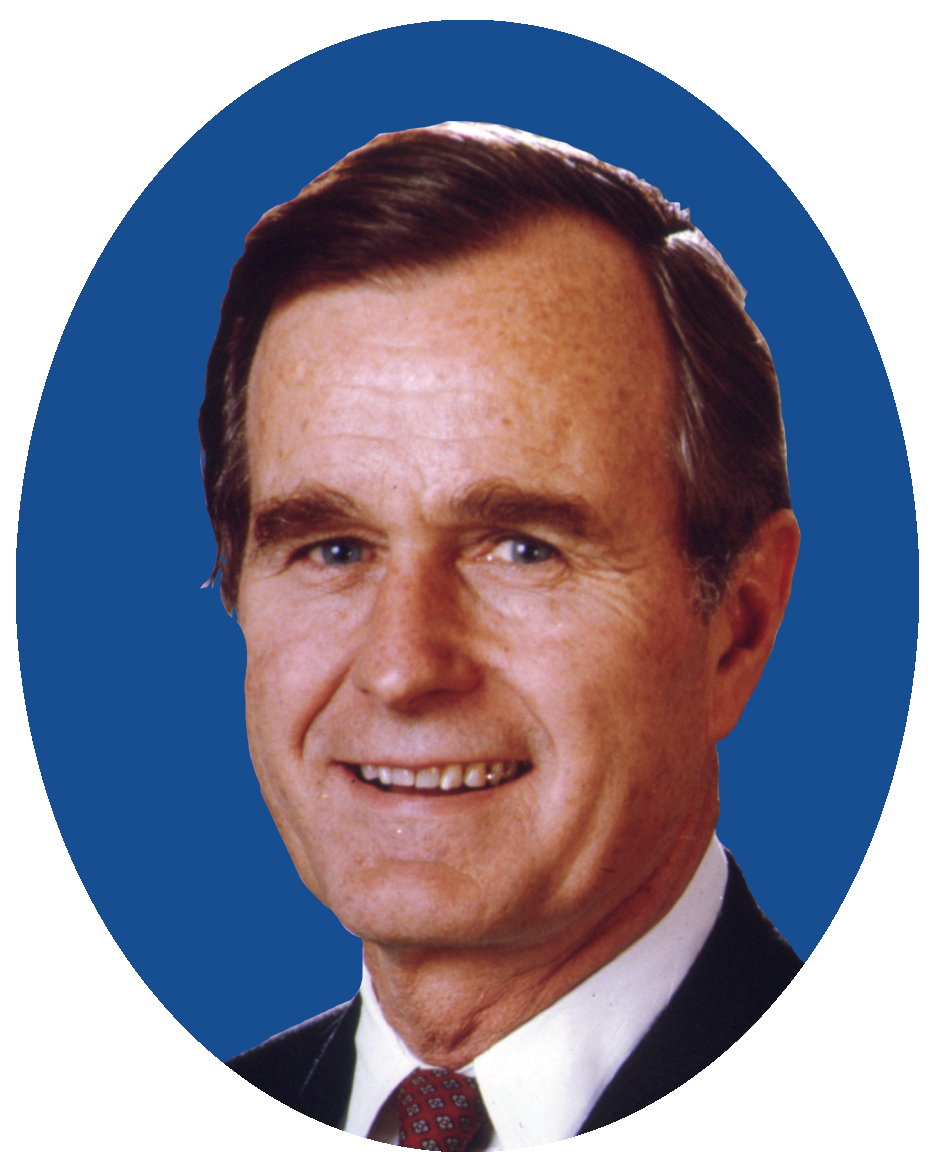
- Nominees; Reagan and Bush

Convention
- Date(s): July 14–17, 1980
- City: Detroit, Michigan
- Venue: Joe Louis Arena
- Keynote speaker: Guy Vander Jagt

Candidates
- Presidential nominee: Ronald Reagan of California
- Vice-presidential nominee: George H. W. Bush of Texas

Voting
- Total delegates: 1,990
- Votes needed for nomination: 996
- Results (president): Reagan (CA): 1,939 (97.44%); Anderson (IL): 37 (1.86%); Bush (TX): 13 (0.65%); Armstrong (TX): 1 (0.05%)
- Results (vice president): Bush (TX): 1,832 (93.33%); Helms (NC): 54 (2.75%); Kemp (NY): 42 (2.14%); Crane (IL): 23 (1.17%); Thompson (IL): 5 (0.26%)

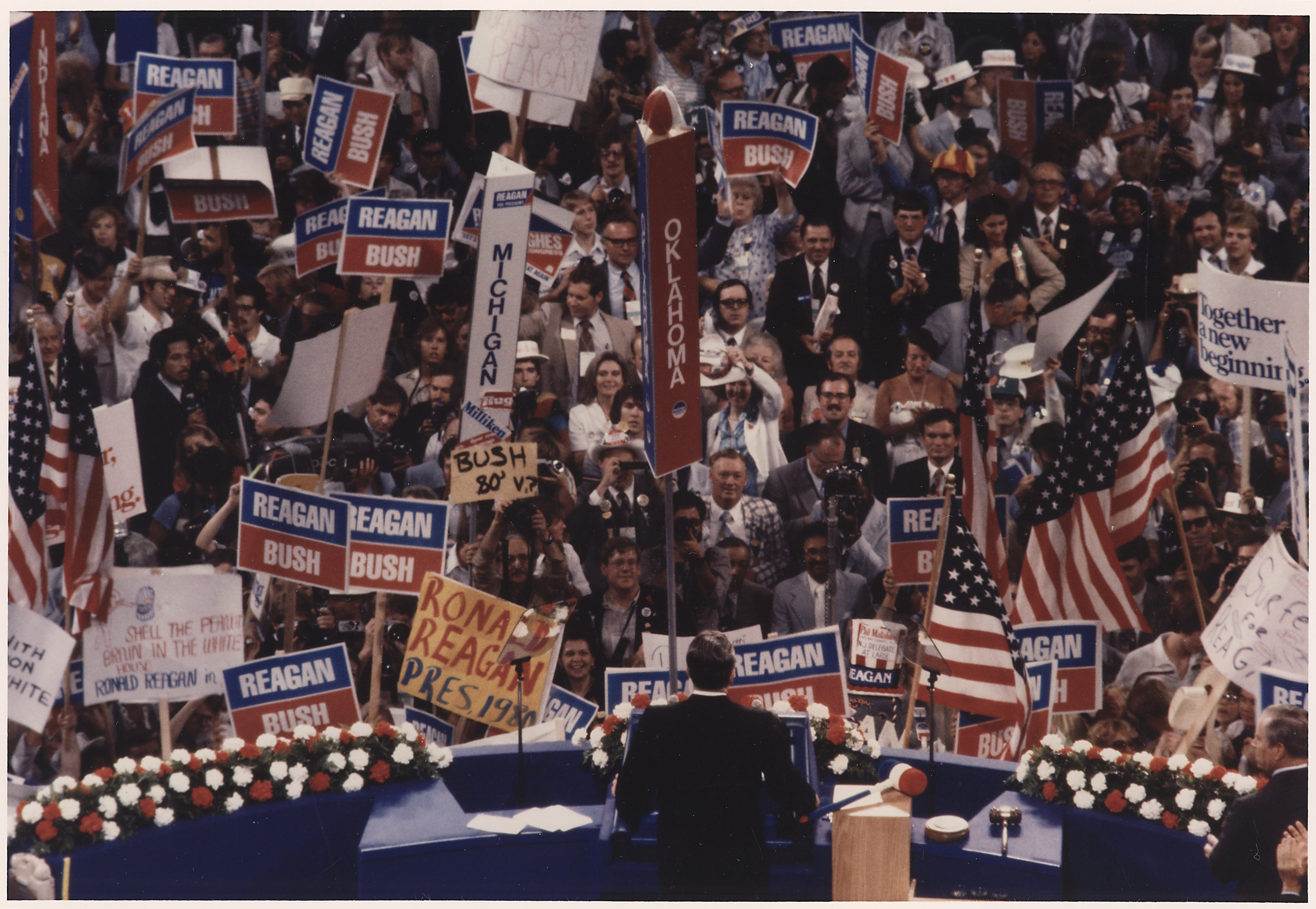
Reagan giving his acceptance speech

The 1980 Republican National Convention convened at Joe Louis Arena in Detroit, Michigan, from July 14 to July 17, 1980. The Republican National Convention nominated retired Hollywood actor and former Governor Ronald Reagan of California for President of the United States and former Director of Central Intelligence George H. W. Bush of Texas for vice president.

Reagan, running on the theme "Let's Make America Great Again," stayed at the Detroit Plaza Hotel in the Renaissance Center, at the time the world's tallest hotel, and delivered his acceptance speech at Joe Louis Arena. It remains the only major party national political convention to have been held in Detroit.

In addition to Reagan, Bush and keynote speaker Guy Vander Jagt; other notable speakers included former United States Secretary of the Treasury William E. Simon; former United States Secretary of Defense Donald Rumsfeld and former President Gerald Ford (the convention's opening night coincided with Ford's 67th birthday, and following his speech Ford was presented with a check to help fund the Gerald Ford Presidential Library); former United States Secretary of State Henry Kissinger; Arizona Senator and 1964 United States presidential election nominee Barry Goldwater (introduced by his son, California Congressman Barry Goldwater Jr.); New York Congressman Jack Kemp; National Association for the Advancement of Colored People executive director Benjamin Hooks; Kansas Senator Nancy Kassebaum (introduced by a film by her father, 1936 Republican presidential nominee Alf Landon); former Texas Governor John Connally and former Ambassador to the United Kingdom Anne Armstrong.

== Presidential vote ==
Reagan's acceptance speech

Following victories in several delegate-rich primaries in April and early-May, the former governor had a lock on the nomination prior to the convention. His last remaining opponent in the race, George H. W. Bush, dropped out on May 26 and urged his supporters to back Reagan. Under party rules then in place, only Reagan's name was officially placed in nomination. Because of this, former contender John B. Anderson's goal having a speaker at the convention was thwarted.

1980 Republican presidential nomination
Candidate	Votes	%
Ronald Reagan	1,939	97.44
John B. Anderson	37	1.86
George H. W. Bush	13	0.65
Anne Armstrong	1	0.05
Total votes	1,990	100%
Votes necessary	996	>50%

== The vice presidential selection ==
Reagan waited until the Convention in July to announce his choice of a running mate, as was customary at the time. A short list of prospective running mates was put together after Reagan clinched the presidential nomination, including Howard Baker, William Simon, Jack Kemp, Richard Lugar, Paul Laxalt and George Bush.

=== Possible selection of Gerald Ford ===
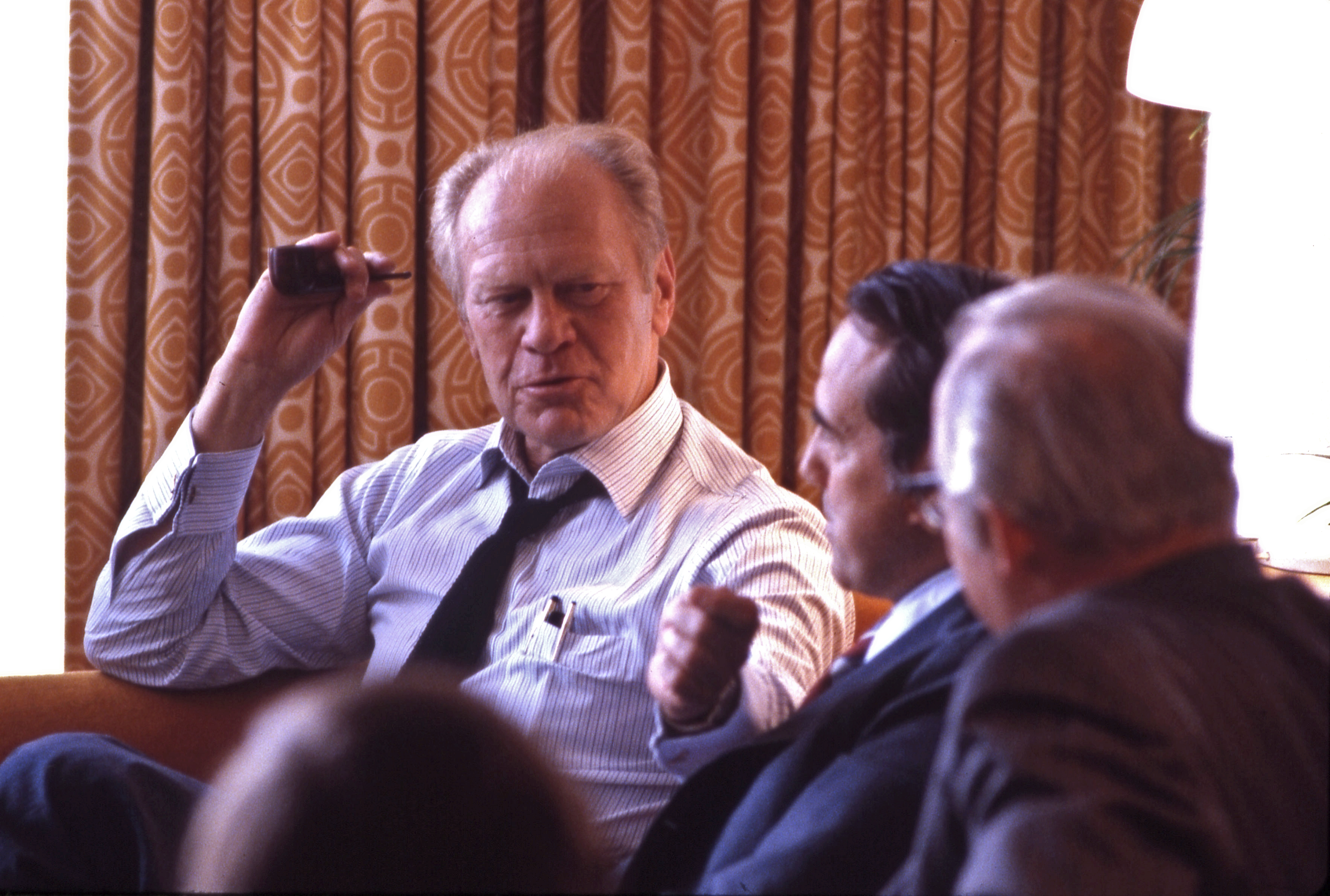
July 16: Gerald Ford consults with Bob Dole, Howard Baker and Bill Brock before making a decision to ultimately decline Reagan's offer.

Shortly before the convention, the possibility of choosing former President Gerald Ford as the vice presidential nominee was given some consideration. Ford asked for certain powers and prerogatives that have been described as making Ford a co-president (had he been chosen). Negotiations for the terms of such an arrangement were held at the Hotel Pontchartrain. These included the return of Henry Kissinger as secretary of State and the appointment of Alan Greenspan as secretary of the Treasury in a "package deal".

On July 16, Ford was interviewed by Walter Cronkite. According to Bob Schieffer, "The whole convention came to a stop," when, after being asked by Cronkite, Ford did not dismiss rumors that Reagan was considering him as a running mate. However, negotiations ultimately fell apart later that day when the two sides could not come to an agreement.

=== Selection of George Bush ===
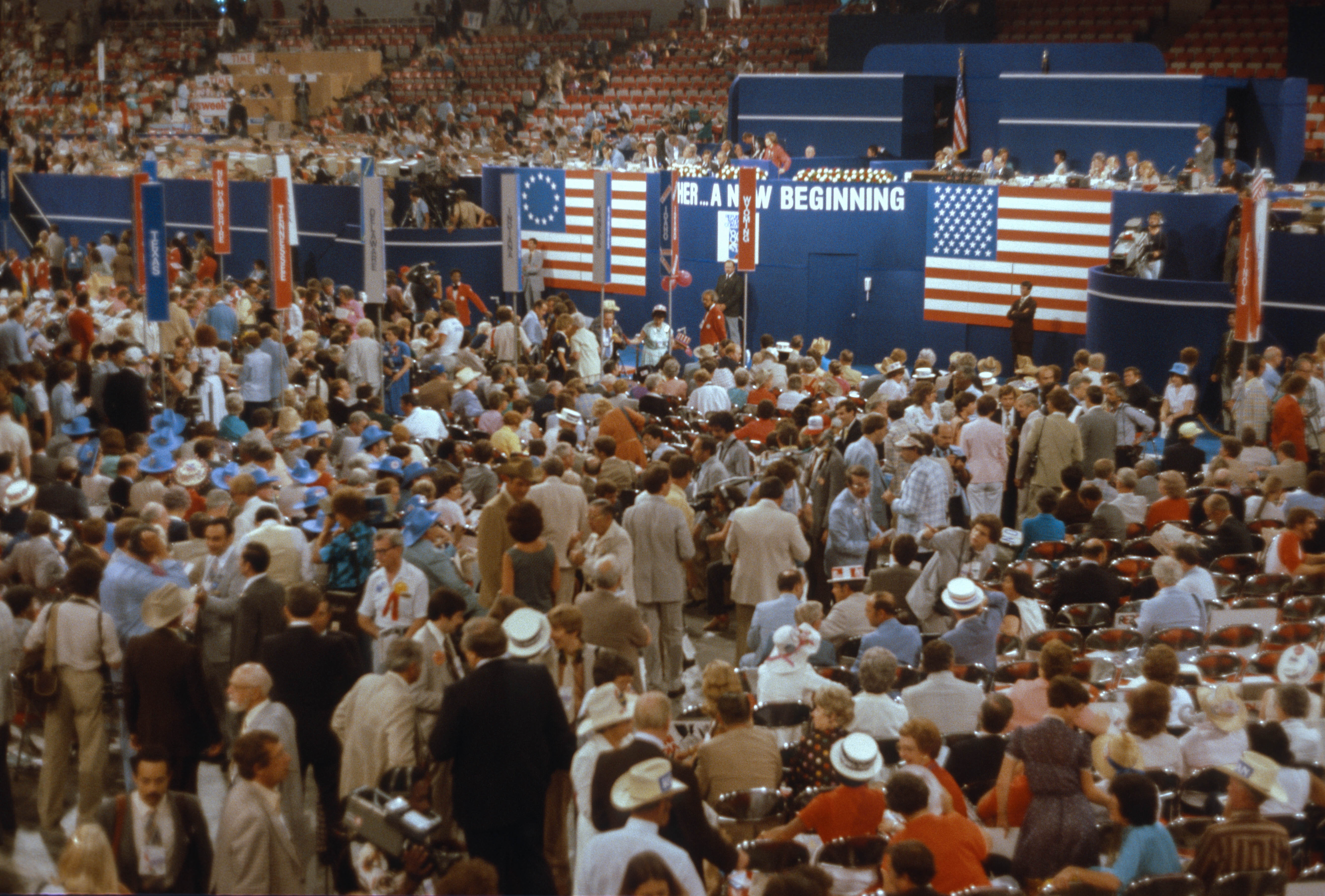
Convention crowd

Reagan's selection of George Bush as his running mate unfolded after the negotiations with Ford reached an impasse, and was finalized less than 24 hours before the ticket was announced. It was Richard Allen, then Reagan's chief foreign policy advisor, who suggested Bush as a viable alternative to Ford, believing that he possessed "the best credentials of the possible running mates mentioned".

=== The vice presidential vote ===
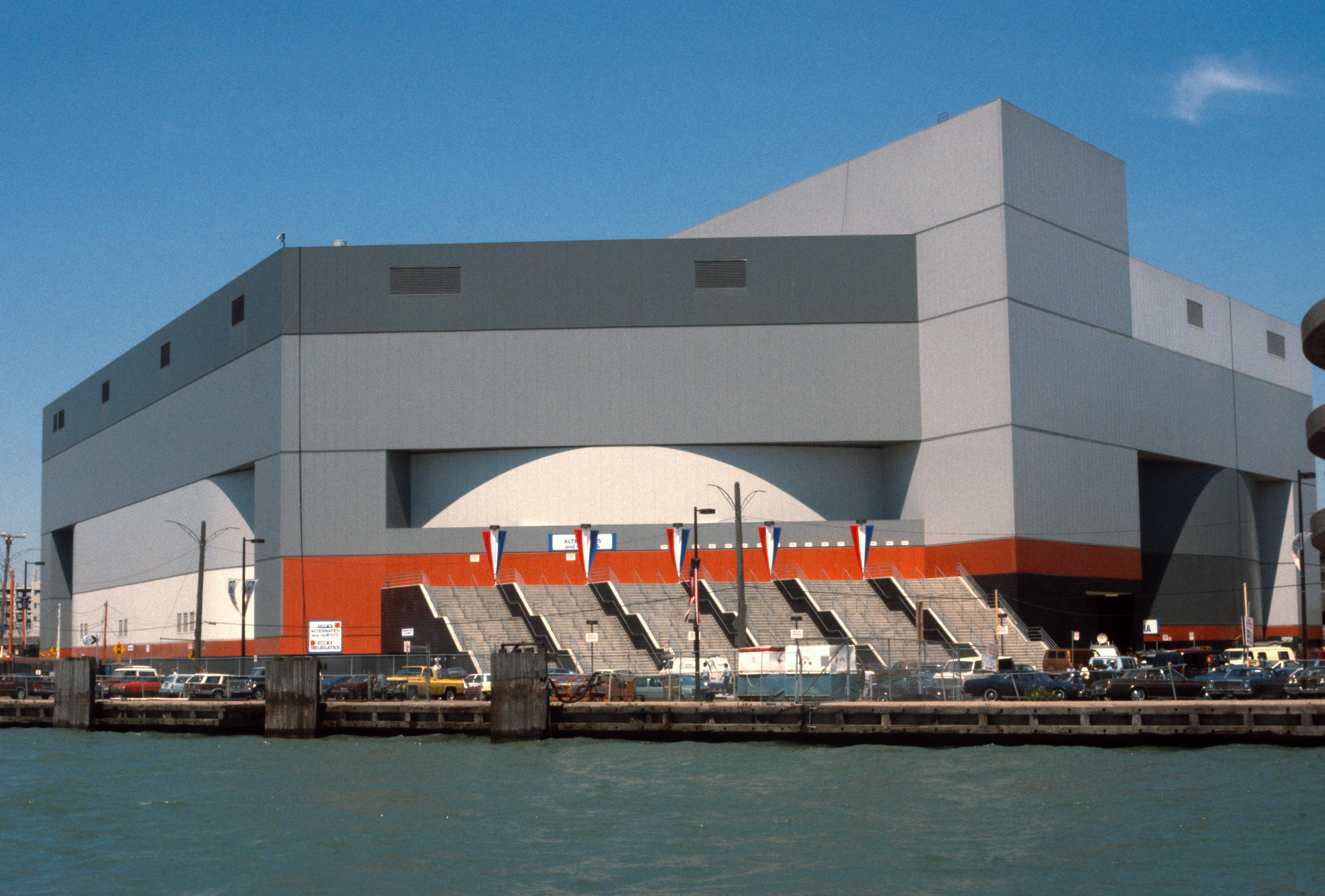
Exterior of the Joe Louis Arena (the main convention hall), photographed during the convention

Even though Reagan had taken the unprecedented step of announcing his running mate choice from the podium of the convention himself, some delegates still resented Bush for defeating Reagan in a number of primaries, and especially the Iowa caucuses. In a direct challenge to Bush's nomination, they nominated Senator Jesse Helms to oppose him. The effort went nowhere, and Bush won by an overwhelming margin. This would be the last time during the 20th century that the bottom half of the ticket would be contested, as the rules would be changed in 1988 to prevent this from happening again.

1980 Republican vice-presidential nomination
Candidate	Votes	%
George H. W. Bush	1,832	93.33
Jesse Helms	54	2.75
Jack Kemp	42	2.14
Phil Crane	23	1.17
James R. Thompson	5	0.26
Others	7	0.35
Total votes	1,963	100%
Votes necessary	982	>50%

== See also ==
- 1980 Republican Party presidential primaries
- History of the United States Republican Party
- List of Republican National Conventions
- United States presidential nominating convention
- 1980 Democratic National Convention
- 1980 United States presidential election
- Ronald Reagan 1980 presidential campaign

Preceded by 1976; Kansas City, Missouri	Republican National Conventions	Succeeded by 1984; Dallas, Texas
