= Guy Vander Jagt =

American politician (1931–2007)

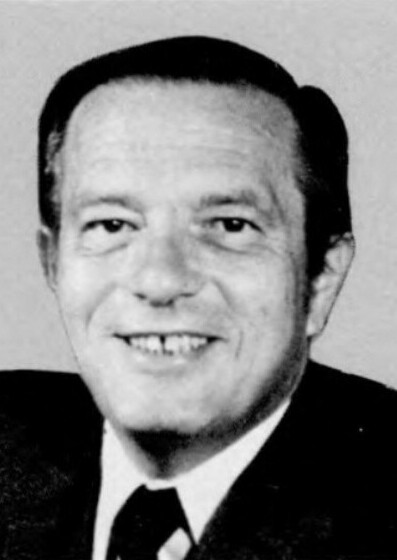

Member of the U.S. House of Representatives from Michigan's 9th district
- In office November 8, 1966 – January 3, 1993
- Preceded by: Robert P. Griffin
- Succeeded by: Pete Hoekstra (redistricting)

Member of the Michigan Senate from the 36th district
- In office January 1, 1965 – November 1966
- Preceded by: District created
- Succeeded by: John Toepp

Personal details
- Born: Guy Adrian Vander Jagt; August 26, 1931 Cadillac, Michigan, U.S.
- Died: June 22, 2007 (aged 75) Washington, D.C., U.S.
- Resting place: Maple Hill Cemetery in Cadillac, Michigan
- Party: Republican
- Spouse: Carol Vander Jagt (m. 1964)
- Education: Hope College (BA); Yale University (BDiv); University of Michigan (JD)
- Guy Vander Jagt's voice Vander Jagt speaks on the problems with incumbency advantage Recorded May 24, 1988

Guy Adrian Vander Jagt (/ˌvændər ˈdʒæk/ VAN-dər JAK; August 26, 1931 – June 22, 2007) was an American lawyer, pastor, and Republican politician from Michigan. He was a member of the U.S. House of Representatives from 1966 to 1993 and chairman of the National Republican Congressional Committee.

Vander Jagt was renowned for his speaking abilities. He was once described by President Nixon as "the best public speaker in America," a sentiment echoed by the producer of the Homebuilder's Convention: "I've been doing this for 26 years and have worked with Colin Powell, Margaret Thatcher and George Bush and many other greats and Vander Jagt was by far the best speaker we ever had." Ronald Reagan was quoted as saying "some call me the great communicator but if there was one thing I dreaded during my eight years in Washington it was having to follow Guy Vander Jagt to the podium."

== Early life and education ==
Vander Jagt was born in Cadillac, Michigan, to Marie and Harry Vander Jagt, a Dutch immigrant. Harry was a rancher, and as a youth, Guy worked on the family's 120-acre (0.49 km^{2}) farm near Cadillac. His talent for public speaking emerged as he began preaching at the Tustin Presbyterian Church while a student at Cadillac High School. He graduated from Hope College in Holland in 1953. While a student at Hope College, he was the state debate champion of Michigan for three years and won the National Oratorical Championship during his senior year. He was also the student body president during his senior year and worked as a radio disc jockey at WHTC.

Vander Jagt went on to attend Yale Divinity School, graduating in 1955 with a B.D. In 1956, he received a Rotary Foundation Fellowship to study for a year at the University of Bonn, Germany.

When he returned to West Michigan, Vander Jagt served as an interim pastor of the Cadillac Congregational Church for a short time, before working at the WWTV TV station as a newscaster and news director. He reportedly memorized the text of each broadcast.

Vander Jagt next returned to school to study law at Georgetown University in Washington, D.C., but soon transferred to the University of Michigan Law School, where he received his J.D. in 1960. He began practicing law in Grand Rapids.

== State Senate ==
In 1964, he was elected to the Michigan State Senate.

Following the death of U.S. Senator Patrick V. McNamara in April 1966, Vander Jagt, along with fellow Republicans Robert P. Griffin and Leroy Augenstein, was a leading contender for appointment to the vacant US Senate seat. Michigan Governor George Romney set guidelines for determining a consensus candidate, including a minimum of 65% support. When it became clear that neither man would meet that threshold, Vander Jagt withdrew and threw his support behind Griffin, who was appointed to the Senate in May. In turn, Vander Jagt entered the race to succeed Griffin in Michigan's 9th congressional district, which stretched from his home in Cadillac along the Lake Michigan shoreline to Muskegon and the suburbs of Grand Rapids.

Vander Jagt ran in two elections on November 8, 1966–a special election for the balance of Griffin's fifth term, and a regular election for a full two-year term. He won both handily and was reelected 12 times, never facing serious opposition in a district widely considered to be the most Republican district in Michigan.

== Congressional career ==
=== Committees ===
One of his earliest appointments was to the House Committee on Science and Astronautics during the development of the U.S. space program and leading to the Moon landing. On the Conservation and National Resources Subcommittee, he worked to establish Sleeping Bear Dunes National Lakeshore near his home, although he later had cause to note that park mismanagement illustrated "one of the most reprehensible aspects of the land acquisition process." As a member of the Committee on Foreign Affairs, President Richard Nixon sent him on trade missions to Africa and Asia. Vander Jagt was appointed to the Ways and Means Committee in 1974 where he served on the Trade and Select Revenue Measures Subcommittees. He continued to serve on this committee throughout his House career. He also served on the Joint Tax Committee of the U.S. House and U.S. Senate.

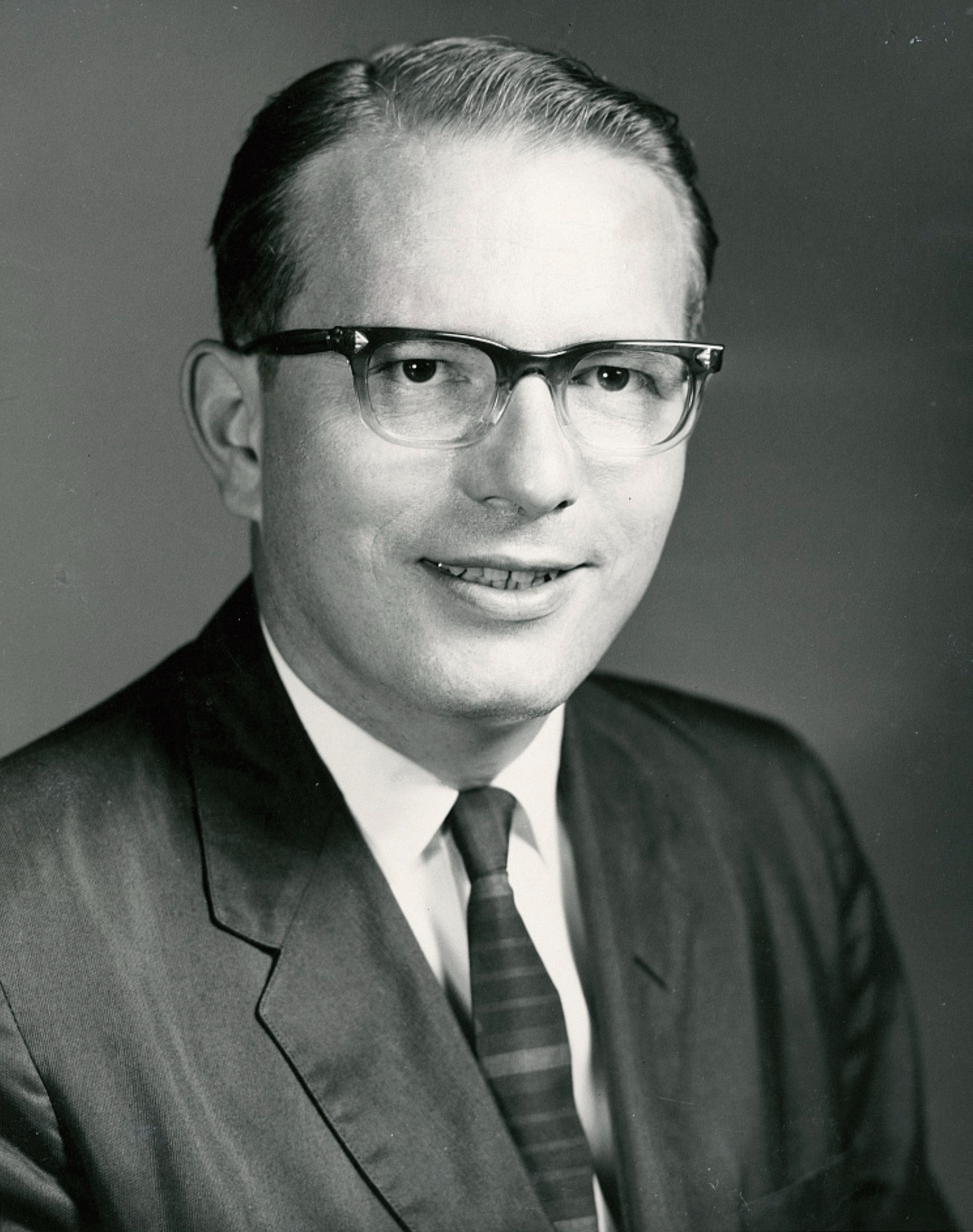
Vander Jagt early in his congressional career

=== National leadership ===
In 1980, Vander Jagt was chosen by presidential nominee Ronald Reagan to deliver the keynote address at the Republican National Convention in Detroit. He delivered the address on Wednesday July 16 without notes, relying entirely on memory. He was being considered as a potential vice presidential candidate. Using momentum from the convention speech, Vander Jagt ran for House Minority Leader after John J. Rhodes of Arizona decided not to run for the post again, but lost to Bob Michel of Illinois. Vander Jagt served as Chairman of the National Republican Congressional Committee from 1975 until he left the House. Vander Jagt made a young Newt Gingrich the chairman of a Republican long-range planning committee before Gingrich was even sworn in, catapulting him ahead of sitting committee members.

=== Repeal of the Twenty-Second Constitutional Amendment ===
In the late 1980s, Vander Jagt helped lead an effort to repeal the Twenty-second Amendment to the United States Constitution, which limits a President to serve two terms. "Ronald Reagan is one of the greatest American Presidents of all time, and I want to keep him on the job," he explained in 1986, in a fundraising letter to raise funds for such a campaign. In 1986, and again in 1987, 1989, and 1991, he sponsored such an amendment in the House.

=== Reapportionment and loss ===
In 1992, Vander Jagt's district was renumbered as the 2nd district. For the first time since his initial run in 1966, he faced a serious primary opponent in Herman Miller executive and fellow Dutch-American Pete Hoekstra. While Hoekstra had never run for office before, he made a name for himself by riding his bicycle across the district. Hoekstra also claimed that Vander Jagt had been in Congress for too long; Vander Jagt had won his first election when Hoekstra was 13 years old.

Hoekstra scored a major upset, winning by over six points. He dominated the district's more populated southern portion, including Muskegon and the Grand Rapids suburbs. Vander Jagt's margins in the northern portion weren't enough to close the gap.

== Later career and death ==
Vander Jagt returned to private law practice with the Cleveland-based law firm BakerHostetler.

He died from pancreatic cancer at a hospice facility in Washington on June 22, 2007, at the age of 75. He was buried in Maple Hill Cemetery in Cadillac, Michigan.

== Notes ==
U.S. House of Representatives
| Preceded by Robert P. Griffin | Member of the U.S. House of Representatives from Michigan's 9th congressional district 1966–1993 | Succeeded by Dale Kildee |
Party political offices
| Preceded by Robert H. Michel | Chair of the National Republican Congressional Committee; 1975–1993 | Succeeded by Bill Paxon |
| Preceded by Howard Baker | Keynote Speaker of the Republican National Convention; 1980 | Succeeded by Katherine D. Ortega |
