= John Toepp =

American politician

John F. Toepp
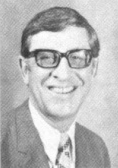

Member of the Michigan Senate from the 36th district
- In office January 1, 1967 – December 31, 1978
- Preceded by: Guy Vander Jagt
- Succeeded by: John Engler

Member of the Michigan House of Representatives from the Wexford County district
- In office January 1, 1963 – December 31, 1964
- Preceded by: Charles A. Boyer
- Succeeded by: District abolished

Personal details
- Born: September 25, 1920 Mansfield, Ohio, US
- Died: April 24, 1979 (aged 58) Lansing, Michigan, US
- Party: Republican

John F. Toepp (September 25, 1920 - April 24, 1979) was an American politician. He was a Republican member of both houses of the Michigan Legislature between 1963 and 1978.

Born in Ohio, Toepp attended Western Michigan University. He served one term in the Michigan House of Representatives and was elected to the Senate in 1966, succeeding Guy Vander Jagt who had won election to Congress. Toepp served in the Senate until his defeat in 1978. He was an alternate delegate to the 1972 Republican National Convention.

Toepp a broadcaster for high school football and basketball games with the radio station WATT, and for the National Basketball League.
