= Milton Zaagman =

American politician (1926–2012)

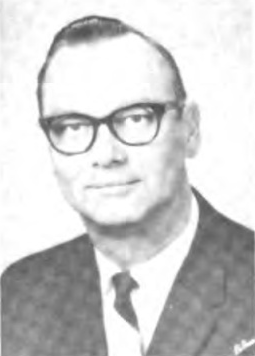

6th Majority Leader of the Michigan Senate
- In office 1974–1974
- Preceded by: Robert VanderLaan
- Succeeded by: William B. Fitzgerald, Jr.

Member of the Michigan Senate
- In office January 1, 1963 – December 31, 1974
- Preceded by: Perry W. Greene
- Succeeded by: John R. Otterbacher
- Constituency: 16th district (1963–1964); 32nd district (1965–1974)

Personal details
- Born: March 28, 1926 Grand Rapids, Michigan, U.S.
- Died: February 3, 2012 (aged 85) Grand Rapids, Michigan, U.S.
- Party: Republican
- Education: Wayne State University; Calvin College
- Profession: Mortician

Military service
- Allegiance: United States
- Branch/service: United States Navy
- Battles/wars: World War II

Milton Zaagman (March 28, 1926 – February 3, 2012) was a Republican member of the Michigan Senate from 1963 through 1974 who was its majority leader in his final year.

== Early life ==
A native of Grand Rapids, Zaagman attended Calvin College and earned a degree in mortuary science from Wayne State University. He served in the United States Navy during World War II. After the war, he married Martha Haverkamp and served three terms on the Kent County board of supervisors. Zaagman was also a director of the Kent County Library.

== Senate career ==
After two unsuccessful campaigns for the state House, Zaagman won election to the Senate in 1962 and served four terms. During his tenure, the Legislature endeavored to implement the state's new constitution. Zaagman was elected president pro tempore in 1971, and majority leader in 1974. He was defeated for re-election in 1974 by John Otterbacher. That year, Zaagman had also run unsuccessfully to fill the vacancy in Congress caused by Gerald Ford's elevation to the vice presidency.

== Later life ==
When Zaagman left the Senate, he pursued a career in lobbying.

Zaagman died on February 3, 2012, aged 85.
