= Jeffrey Padden =

American politician (born 1951

Member of the Michigan House of Representatives
- In office January 1, 1974 – December 31, 1984
- Preceded by: William R. Copeland
- Succeeded by: Joseph Palamara
- Constituency: 27th district (1975-1982); 30th district (1983-1984)

Personal details
- Born: February 22, 1951
- Party: Democratic
- Education: Wayne State University; Harvard Kennedy School

Jeffrey D. Padden (born February 22, 1951) is a former American politician who served in the Michigan House of Representatives from 1974 to 1984.
