= Charles Zollar =

American politician

Charles O. Zollar
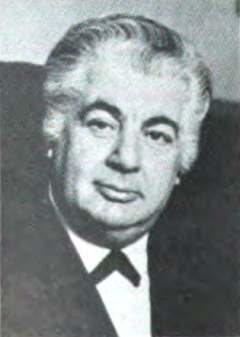

Member of the Michigan Senate from the 22nd district
- In office January 1, 1965 – December 31, 1978
- Preceded by: William J. Leppien
- Succeeded by: Harry Gast

Personal details
- Born: January 6, 1914 Chicago, Illinois, U.S.
- Died: February 24, 1988 (aged 74) St. Joseph, Michigan, U.S.
- Party: Republican

Charles O. Zollar is a former Republican member of the Michigan Senate, representing a portion of southwest Michigan from 1965 through 1978.

Born in Chicago in 1914, Zollar served in World War II and was a graduate of Michigan State University's Continuing Education Program. He was the owner and manager of Zollar Farms, and was president of Zollar Nurseries.

Zollar first won election to the Senate in 1964. Four years later, he was named chairman of the Appropriations Committee, serving in that role for six years. Zollar was also Republican caucus chairman from 1970 until leaving the Senate in 1978. He was supervisor of Benton Township in 1981.

Zollar died on February 24, 1988, aged 74.
