= Harry A. DeMaso =

American politician

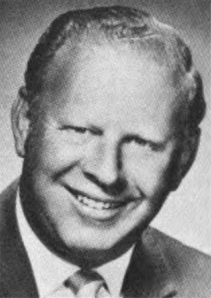

Member of the Michigan Senate from the 20th district
- In office January 1, 1967 – December 31, 1986
- Preceded by: Roger Johnson
- Succeeded by: Joe Schwarz

Member of the Michigan House of Representatives
- In office January 1, 1957 – December 31, 1966
- Preceded by: Frederick W. Zinn
- Succeeded by: James H. Heinze
- Constituency: Calhoun County 2nd district (1957–1964); 45th district (1965–1966)

Personal details
- Born: Aristide Augustino DeMaso; February 24, 1921 Battle Creek, Michigan
- Died: January 9, 2015 (aged 93) East Lansing, Michigan
- Party: Republican
- Spouse(s): Mary Jane; Marie Ann
- Education: Argubright College of Business;Michigan State University

Military service
- Allegiance: United States of America
- Branch/service: United States Army Air Forces
- Battles/wars: World War II

Harry A. DeMaso (February 24, 1921 – January 9, 2015) was an American politician who was a Michigan Republican State Senator from the 20th district, which comprised the counties of Calhoun and Eaton, and one township in Ingham (Delhi Township). He served as Michigan's Acting Governor during the 1984 Democratic National Convention.

== Biography ==
The oldest son of Italian immigrants from Pieve di Cadore, Harry DeMaso (born Aristide Augustino DeMaso) grew up in Battle Creek, Michigan. He graduated from Argubright College of Business and became an accounting instructor for the college. He subsequently attended Michigan State University for one year until he joined the United States Army Air Corps during World War II where he was a drill instructor (1943–1945). Following the war, he worked an insurance office manager until embarking on his political career. Later in his career, DeMaso served as vice president and member of the board of trustees of the Argubright College of Business (which subsequently was purchased by Davenport University in Grand Rapids, Michigan).

In 1952, DeMaso began a political career in Michigan that spanned 34 years. He began as Battle Creek Township Supervisor, an office he held for 13 years, from 1952 to 1965. From 1957 to 1966, he served as a member of the Michigan State House of Representatives (Calhoun County 2nd District 1957–1964, 45th District 1965–1966). For 19 years (1967–1986), he was a member of the Michigan State Senate (20th district). In the Senate, he was Assistant President Pro Tempore (1974), Associate President Pro Tempore (1975–1982), Assistant Minority Leader (1982–1983), and President Pro Tempore (1984–1986). It was in the latter position that he served as Michigan's acting governor for four days when the Democratic Governor and Lieutenant Governor attended the 1984 Democratic Convention.

In 1967 while George Romney was governor of Michigan, DeMaso (Chairman of Michigan's Senate Finance Committee) was a critical sponsor of the state's first income tax. Later in 1972, he stated "It's a lot easier for a governor and legislators to levy a tax on cigarettes, tobacco products, liquor, and beer, than to levy broad-based taxes." In 1983 with Michigan mired in a recession and facing declining tax revenue, then Governor James Blanchard proposed a controversial income tax hike in order to maintain government spending. Worried about the state's financial situation, he was the only Republican in a Democratic-controlled legislature to vote for the measure. The controversy surrounding the passage of this tax led to the 1983 Michigan tax vote recalls for several politicians; however no challenge was mounted against Harry DeMaso.

DeMaso pursued the development and implementation of a global economic revitalization strategy – "bringing the world to Michigan." He promoted Battle Creek's Fort Custer Industrial Park during the 1970s and 1980s. Together with former Battle Creek Unlimited CEO/President Joseph Pratt and former Mayor Frederick Brydges, DeMaso through numerous trade missions to Japan and Germany was able to bring new industries into Battle Creek which created many new jobs. The city's status as a Port of Entry was made possible with DeMaso's efforts together with Senator Carl Levin. In 1982, DeMaso was the recipient of Michigan State Senate Resolution 284, honoring his achievements in economic development. Fort Custer Industrial Park today houses numerous international plants and facilities.

In addition to the above offices, DeMaso is past director of the Battle Creek Township Civil Defense; past president and secretary-treasurer of the Calhoun County Chapter of Michigan Township Association; past director, Battle Creek Area Development Corporation; past chairman and executive director, Calhoun County Safety Commission; past chairman, Calhoun County Planning Commission; past general chairman, Michigan State Council Technical Committee; former chairman, Battle Creek Association of Supervisors Committee on Constitutional Convention; past member of Michigan Crime and Delinquency Council Technical Committee; and former chairman, Battle Creek Area Government Council. He is a member of the Freemasons, Order of the Eastern Star, Veterans of Foreign Wars, American Legion, Kiwanis, and Elks.

DeMaso has won numerous awards including: 1957 - Battle Creek Enquirer and News "George Award" for community service; 1962 - Michigan Probate Judges and Juvenile Officials Association Award; 1964 - Honorary Legion of Honor, International Order of DeMolay; 1964 - Keep Michigan Beautiful, Inc. Award; 1961, 1996 - Fraternal Order of Police, Michigan Lodge; 1969 - "Honorary Lay Membership," Michigan Association of Osteopathic Physicians and Surgeons; 1970 - Award for outstanding service, American Legion Hospital, Inc.; 1971 - Commission Kentucky Colonel, State of Kentucky; 1976 – Certificate of Leadership in International Affairs, Michigan International Council; 1977 - Honorary Ambassador, Battle Creek Area Chamber of Commerce Ambassadors Club; 1979 - Golden Ambassador Award, Michigan Tobacco and Candy Distributors and Vendors Association; 1979 - Presidents Award, Michigan Society of Planning Officials; and 1979 - "International Council Award" Michigan International Citizen.

Following his 1986 retirement from politics, DeMaso became the President of Fred Sanders Export Co. and vice-president of Sanders Confectionery Co. Since 1988, he had been President of DeMaso & Associates, Inc., a consulting firm designed to promote international business collaborations with the state of Michigan.

== Personal ==
In 1947, Harry DeMaso married Mary Jane Hocott (9/1/1926 - 4/20/2020). They had two sons (David and Thomas), four grandchildren, and four great-grandchildren. DeMaso was remarried to Marie Ann Frayer in 1995.
