= Thomas G. Sharpe =

American politician (1917–2000)

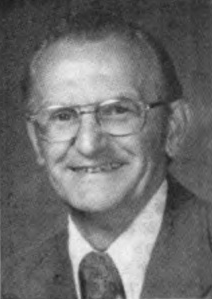

Member of the Michigan House of Representatives from the 51st district
- In office January 1, 1965 – January 1, 1979
- Preceded by: District established
- Succeeded by: Frederick P. Dillingham

Member of the Michigan House of Representatives from the Shiawassee County district
- In office January 1, 1963 – January 1, 1965
- Preceded by: Jay Murray Terbush Jr.
- Succeeded by: District abolished

Personal details
- Born: April 6, 1917 Fowlerville, Michigan, US
- Died: December 18, 2000 (aged 83)
- Party: Republican
- Spouse: Esther Cornell
- Education: Detroit Business Institute

Thomas George Sharpe III (April 6, 1917 – December 18, 2000) was a Michigan politician.

== Early life ==
Thomas George Sharpe III was born on April 6, 1917, in Fowlerville, Michigan to parents Thomas George Sharpe Jr. and Laura Sharpe.

== Education ==
Sharpe attended the Detroit Business Institute.

== Career ==
Sharpe served as a delegate to the Michigan state constitutional convention from the Shiawassee district from 1961 to 1962. On November 6, 1962, Sharpe was elected to the Michigan House of Representatives where he represented the Shiawassee County district from January 1, 1963, to January 1, 1965. On November 4, 1964, Sharpe was elected to the Michigan House of Representatives where he represented the 51st district from January 1, 1965, to January 1, 1979.

== Personal life ==
On November 7, 1936, Sharpe married Esther Diane Cornell. Together, they had four children. Sharpe was a member of the Nazarene Church.

== Death ==
Sharpe died on December 18, 2000. His last residence was in Howell, Michigan.
