= Matthew McNeely =

American politician (1920–2002)

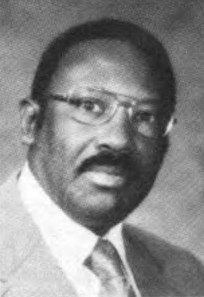

71st Speaker pro tempore of the Michigan House of Representatives
- In office January 10, 1973 – December 30, 1986
- Preceded by: Stanley J. Davis
- Succeeded by: Teola Pearl Hunter

Member of the Michigan House of Representatives
- In office January 1, 1965 – December 31, 1986
- Preceded by: District created
- Succeeded by: Ilona Varga
- Constituency: 26th district (1965-1972); 16th district (1973-1982); 3rd district (1983-1986)

Personal details
- Born: May 11, 1920 Millen, Georgia
- Died: September 11, 2002 (aged 82) Taylor, Michigan
- Party: Democratic

Matthew McNeely (May 11, 1920 – September 11, 2002) was a Michigan state politician. He served for over 20 years in the Michigan House of Representatives and was speaker pro tempore of the House for a record 18 years. In recognition of his service in the chair, the House voted to make McNeely Speaker pro tempore emeritus.
