= Thomas H. Brown (Michigan politician) =

American politician

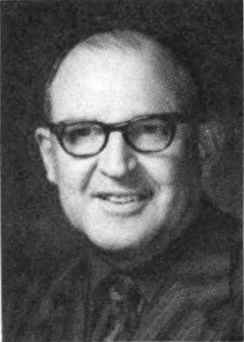

Member of the Michigan House of Representatives from the 37th district
- In office January 1, 1971 – December 31, 1982
- Preceded by: Vincent J. Petitpren
- Succeeded by: Edward E. Mahalak

1st Mayor of Westland
- In office 1966–1969
- Preceded by: City incorporated
- Succeeded by: Eugene McKinney

Personal details
- Born: July 29, 1917 Indiana
- Died: August 24, 2002 (aged 85)
- Party: Democratic

Military service
- Allegiance: United States
- Branch/service: United States Army

Thomas H. Brown (July 29, 1917 - August 24, 2002) was a Democratic politician who served in the Michigan House of Representatives and as the first mayor of Westland, Michigan.

A native of Indiana, Brown moved to Michigan and served in several elected offices in Nankin Township before the township was incorporated as the City of Westland. He was elected its first mayor.

In 1970, Brown was elected to the first of six terms in the House, where he chaired the chamber's Towns and Counties Committee.

Brown was member of the Lions, the Knights of Columbus, Amvets, and the Veterans of Foreign Wars. He was a delegate to the 1968 Democratic National Convention in Chicago which nominated Hubert H. Humphrey for President of the United States.

Brown died of cancer on August 24, 2002, aged 85.
