= James E. Defebaugh =

American politician (1926–2014)

James Elliott Defebaugh III
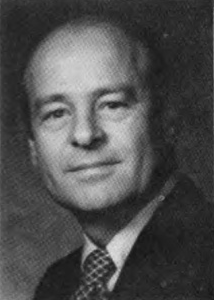

Member of the Michigan House of Representatives from the 65th district
- In office January 1, 1971 – December 31, 1982
- Preceded by: William P. Hampton
- Succeeded by: Ruth B. McNamee

Personal details
- Born: October 8, 1926 Chicago, Illinois
- Died: October 16, 2014 (aged 88)
- Party: Republican
- Spouse: Lois (m. 1953-2013)
- Education: Knox College

Military service
- Allegiance: United States of America
- Branch/service: United States Army Air Force
- Battles/wars: World War II

James E. Defebaugh III (October 8, 1926 – October 16, 2014) was a Republican member of the Michigan House of Representatives from 1971 to 1982.

== Biography ==
Defebaugh was born in Chicago on October 8, 1926, to Carl and Martha Defebaugh. He served in the United States Army Air Force during World War II and was a graduate of Knox College. Defebaugh later worked as an advertising consultant with the Campbell Ewald firm in Detroit, primarily working with Chevrolet and Procter & Gamble. Defebaugh married Lois on October 17, 1953; she died in the fall of 2013.

The chairman of the Oakland County Republican Party from 1968 to 1970, Defebaugh was elected to the House in 1970. During his tenure in the House, he was Republican whip and assistant floor leader. Defebaugh also served on the Michigan Bicentennial Commission, the Governor's Advisory Commission on the Regulation of Financial Institutions, and the Interstate Cooperation Commission.

Defebaugh enjoyed history, particularly the Civil War. With his wife, he also traveled to 21 countries in Europe, Asia, Australia, and New Zealand.
