= Quincy P. Hoffman =

American politician

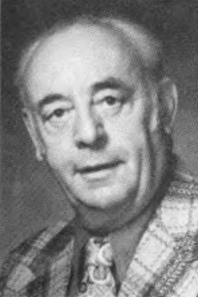

Member of the Michigan House of Representatives from the 77th district
- In office January 1, 1965 – December 31, 1980
- Preceded by: District created
- Succeeded by: Keith Muxlow

Sanilac County Sheriff
- In office 1959–1964

Personal details
- Born: May 30, 1913 Applegate, Michigan, United States
- Died: December 12, 1994 (aged 81) Sandusky, Michigan
- Resting place: Port Sanilac, MI
- Party: Republican
- Spouse: Marian McNaughton Hoffman
- Children: Howard Hoffman, Janice Hoffman Lyon
- Parent(s): Phineas and Grace (Benedict) Hoffman-->
- Nickname: Quincy

Quincy P. Hoffman (May 30, 1913 – December 12, 1994) was a Republican member of the Michigan House of Representatives, representing part of the Thumb from 1965 through 1980.

Born in 1913, Hoffman attended Michigan State University and graduated from the FBI's training school and Michigan Traffic Safety Center Enforcement School. He was president of the Village of Applegate as well as of the local school board, and was elected Sanilac County sheriff in 1954. Hoffman was elected to the House in 1964 and served eight terms.

Hoffman was director of the Michigan Sheriff's Association, a past commissioner in the Boy Scouts of America, and a Freemason.
