= Harry Gast =

American politician

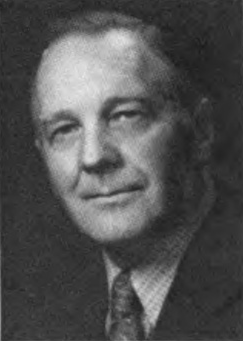

Member of the Michigan Senate
- In office January 1, 1979 – December 31, 2002
- Preceded by: Charles Zollar
- Succeeded by: Tom George
- Constituency: 22nd district (1979–1994); 20th district (1995–2002)

Member of the Michigan House of Representatives from the 43rd district
- In office January 1, 1971 – December 31, 1978
- Preceded by: Don R. Pears
- Succeeded by: Carl Gnodtke

Personal details
- Born: September 19, 1920 St. Joseph, Michigan
- Died: July 30, 2015 (aged 94) St. Joseph, Michigan
- Party: Republican
- Spouse: Vera "Jean" (d. 2016)
- Education: Michigan State University
- Profession: Farmer

Harry T. Gast Jr. (September 19, 1920 – July 30, 2015) was a Republican politician from Michigan who served in both houses of the Michigan Legislature and in various local offices between the mid-1950s and 2002. During his final 18 years in the Senate, Gast chaired the appropriations committee.

Gast's first elected office was as treasurer of Lincoln Township, an office he held for 18 years. He then became township supervisor for eight years before running for the Michigan House of Representatives. He also served as a member and president of the Evans School board.

A portion of M-63 in Berrien County was named the "Harry Gast Parkway" in 2008, and the Senate Appropriations Committee room in the Michigan State Capitol was named in his honor in 2015.

Gast died on July 30, 2015, aged 94.
