= Bela E. Kennedy =

American politician

Member of the Michigan House of Representatives
- In office 1971–1982
- Preceded by: Edson V. Root Jr. (54); James H. Heinze (45)
- Succeeded by: James S. Farnsworth (54); James Mick Middaugh (45)
- Constituency: 54th district (1971–1973); 45th district (1973–1982)

Personal details
- Born: July 8, 1918 Bangor, Michigan
- Died: August 29, 2008 (aged 90) Winter Haven, Florida
- Party: Republican
- Education: Michigan State University
- Occupation: politician

Bela Ellis "Bek" Kennedy (8 July 1918 – 29 August 2008) was an American politician from the Michigan Republican Party. He served in the Michigan House of Representatives.
