= Philip Mastin =

American politician

Philip O. Mastin Jr. (May 27, 1930 – November 28, 2012) was an American politician from Pontiac, Michigan.

Mastin served as a Democrat in the Michigan House of Representatives' 69th District and then in the Michigan State Senate's 8th District. He was removed from his state senate seat after losing a recall election in 1983, becoming the first Michigan state legislator to be successfully recalled.

== Career ==
=== Local government ===
During his 25 years in Michigan government, Mastin served as Hazel Park City Councilman, Oakland County supervisor, Oakland County commissioner, deputy chairman and treasurer of the Oakland County Democratic Party, Pontiac city manager, and director of the Downtown Development Authority in Pontiac.

=== Boards ===
Mastin served for two terms as president of the Mental Health Association in Michigan (1987–1988) and was a member of the state association's board of directors from 1977 and was elected an "honorary board member" in 2000. Additionally, he served on the National Mental Health Association's executive committee as well as their board of directors from 1989 to 1995. He was elected to the board of the United Way of Michigan in 1996, serving on the executive committee and as chairman of the state agency's Public Policy Committee.

=== State legislature ===
Mastin served three terms in the Michigan House of Representatives, from 1971 to 1976.

Mastin served a partial term in the Michigan State Senate in 1983 before being recalled by his constituents.

== Michigan State Senate recall ==
Mastin voted in favor of a 38% tax increase (from 4.6% to 6.35%) in order to address the state budget crisis, which led to the anti-tax group Citizens Against Unnecessary State Expenditures (CAUSE) lobbying for his removal. Mastin was in the first year of his first Michigan State Senate term when the election to recall him took place on November 22, 1983. The event earned national attention for being the first time a Michigan state legislator was recalled from office by their constituents.

Sen. David Serotkin of Mt. Clemens was recalled soon after, with the events ultimately flipping majority control in the Michigan State Senate to the Republican Party for the first time in ten years. Republicans held this majority until the 2022 election. Governor James Blanchard, also a Democrat, faced and beat recall efforts from the same anti-tax group. Other recall efforts were stopped with court challenges.

== Personal life ==
Before his death, he and his wife, Donna, were members of Fenton First United Methodist Church. Phil served as president of his church golf league and served for 10 years as a member of his condominium association's advisory committee. He finally retired in 1994.
