= Earl E. Nelson =

American politician (1937–2016)

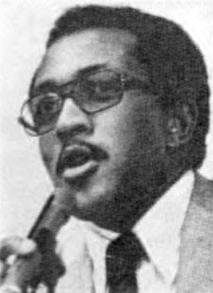

Member of the Michigan Senate from the 24th district
- In office January 1, 1975 – December 31, 1978
- Preceded by: Philip Pittinger
- Succeeded by: William Sederburg

Member of the Michigan House of Representatives from the 57th district
- In office January 1, 1971 – December 31, 1974
- Preceded by: Thomas L. Brown
- Succeeded by: David Hollister

Personal details
- Born: August 29, 1937 Emerson, Arkansas, U.S.
- Died: November 1, 2016 (aged 79) Punta Gorda, Florida, U.S.
- Party: Democratic
- Education: Michigan State University

Earl E. Nelson (August 29, 1937 – November 1, 2016) was a Democratic member of both houses of the Michigan Legislature from 1971 through 1978.

Born in Emerson, Arkansas, Nelson graduated from Michigan State University. He taught in the Lansing schools and worked for the Michigan Chamber of Commerce. In 1970, he won election to the Michigan House of Representatives. After two terms, he won election to the Senate.

Nelson was the founder of the Earl Nelson Singers and was an ordained minister. He was also the Director of Equity for the Michigan Department of Education.
