= Martin Buth =

American politician (1917–2017)

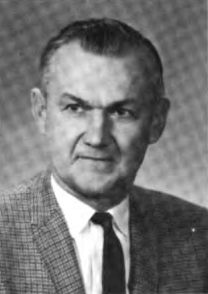

Member of the Michigan House of Representatives from the 90th district
- In office 1959–1982

Personal details
- Born: October 18, 1917 Comstock Park, Michigan, U.S.
- Died: July 24, 2017 (aged 99) Comstock Park, Michigan, U.S.
- Party: Republican
- Spouse: GeorgeAnn Louise Shaw
- Children: 2
- Education: Michigan State University
- Occupation: dairy farmer

Martin D. Buth II (October 18, 1917 – July 24, 2017) was an American politician from the state of Michigan. He served in the Michigan House of Representatives from 1959 to 1982.

== Early life ==
Buth was born in Comstock Park, Michigan, and attended school in the same place. He later studied at Michigan State University, focusing on dairy farming.

== Career ==
Buth was elected to the Michigan House of Representatives in 1959. He retired from the House in 1989, and served two terms on the Kent County Board of Commissioners.

== Personal life ==
Buth's son George S. Buth served as a judge on the 17th Circuit Court in Kent County for 30 years.

Buth died on July 24, 2017, at the age of 99.
