= Gilbert DiNello =

American politician

Gilbert J. DiNello
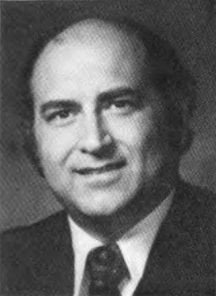

Member of the Michigan Senate from the 26th district
- In office January 1, 1979 – December 31, 1994
- Preceded by: Joseph Snyder
- Succeeded by: Mike Rogers

Member of the Michigan House of Representatives from the 73rd district
- In office January 1, 1973 – December 31, 1978
- Preceded by: Harold Clark
- Succeeded by: Leo Lalonde

Personal details
- Born: February 28, 1935 Detroit, Michigan
- Died: December 17, 1996 (aged 61) Troy, Michigan
- Party: Republican (1993-1996); Democratic (through 1992)
- Education: University of Detroit (B.B.A.)
- Profession: Real estate

Gilbert DiNello was a member of both houses of the Michigan Legislature between 1979 and 1994.

Born in 1935, DiNello earned a bachelor's degree in business administration from the University of Detroit and began a career in real estate. Beginning his political career as a precinct delegate, DiNello was elected to the state House in 1972 where he served three terms and was known as a suburban Detroit conservative Democrat. In 1978, he was elected to the Senate.

He was known as a staunch opponent of any tax increase, even questioning the constitutionality of the state's so-called Headlee Amendment on the basis that it allowed for annual increases in property assessments. DiNello was the only Democrat in the Senate who refused to support then-Governor James Blanchard's proposed income tax hike in 1983. The move caused then-Senate Majority Leader John Engler to appoint DiNello to a committee chairmanship which effectively banished him from the Democratic caucus. He officially switched to the Republican Party in 1992. DiNello was also opposed to most legislation specifically pertaining to Detroit, to the point of being accused of being a racist by a fellow senator on the Senate floor. He stood for re-election in 1994 as a Republican in the newly drawn 11th District and lost to Ken DeBeaussaert.

DiNello ran unsuccessfully for the Republican nomination in the 10th congressional district in 1996. He was a member of the Knights of Columbus, the Eagles, and the Lions.

DiNello suffered a heart attack at the Somerset Collection in Troy and was pronounced dead on arrival at Beaumont Hospital. He was 61.
