= F. Robert Edwards =

American politician

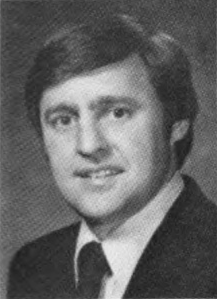

Member of the Michigan House of Representatives from the 79th district
- In office January 10, 1973 – December 31, 1976
- Preceded by: James F. Smith
- Succeeded by: Joe Conroy

Member of the Michigan House of Representatives from the 82nd district
- In office January 13, 1971 – December 31, 1972
- Preceded by: Albert R. Horrigan
- Succeeded by: Bobby Crim

Personal details
- Born: March 26, 1940 (age 86) Newberry, Michigan
- Party: Republican
- Education: General Motors Institute

F. Robert Edwards (born March 26, 1940) is a former member of the Michigan House of Representatives.

== Early life and education ==
Edwards was born on March 26, 1940, in Newberry, Michigan. Edwards graduated from Newberry High School. Edwards earned a B.S. in engineering from the General Motors Institute, now known as Kettering University.

== Career ==
Edwards was a senior project engineer in the Buick division. In 1968, Edwards unsuccessfully ran for the Michigan House of Representatives seat representing the 82nd district. On November 3, 1970, Edwards was elected to the Michigan House of Representatives, where he represented the 82nd district from January 13, 1971, to December 31, 1972. On November 7, 1972, Edwards was elected to the Michigan House of Representatives, where he represented the 82nd district from January 10, 1973, to December 31, 1976. Edwards resided in Flint, Michigan, during his time in the legislature. In 1976, Edwards ran for the position again, but was not re-elected. In 1988, Edwards unsuccessfully ran for the state house seat representing the 83rd district. In the mid 1990s, Edwards served as Director of the Michigan Employment Security Commission.

== Personal life ==
Edwards married some time between 1971 and 1974. Edwards is Methodist.
