= 2020 United States House of Representatives elections in Michigan =

- November 3, 2020

All 14 Michigan seats in the United States House of Representatives
	Majority party	Minority party	Third party
Party	Democratic	Republican	Libertarian
Last election	7	7	0
Seats before	7	6	1
Seats won	7	7	0
Seat change	Steady	▲1	▼1
Popular vote	2,688,527	2,617,881	59,958
Percentage	49.58%	48.27%	1.11%
Swing	▼2.75%	▲3.62%	▲0.82%

Democratic
40–50%
50–60%
60–70%
70–80%
Republican
40–50%
50–60%
60–70%
70–80%

The 2020 United States House of Representatives elections in Michigan were held on November 3, 2020, to elect the 14 U.S. representatives from the state of Michigan, one from each of the state's 14 congressional districts. The elections coincided with the 2020 U.S. presidential election, as well as other elections to the House of Representatives, elections to the United States Senate, and various state and local elections. Party primaries were held on August 4, 2020. The Michigan delegation prior to the election consisted of seven Democrats, six Republicans and one Libertarian. Unless otherwise indicated, the Cook Political Report rated the races as safe for the party of the incumbents.

== Overview ==
Results of the 2020 United States House of Representatives elections in Michigan by district:

District	Democratic		Republican		Others		Total		Result
District	Votes	%	Votes	%	Votes	%	Votes	%	Result
District 1	153,328	36.84%	256,581	61.65%	6,310	1.52%	416,219	100.00%	Republican hold
District 2	154,122	38.22%	238,711	59.20%	10,414	2.58%	402,247	100.00%	Republican hold
District 3	189,769	47.04%	213,649	52.96%	1	0.00%	403,419	100.00%	Republican gain
District 4	120,802	32.37%	242,621	65.00%	9,822	2.63%	373,245	100.00%	Republican hold
District 5	196,599	54.45%	150,772	41.76%	13,661	3.79%	361,032	100.00%	Democratic hold
District 6	152,085	40.13%	211,496	55.81%	15,399	4.06%	378,980	100.00%	Republican hold
District 7	159,743	41.25%	227,524	58.75%	0	0.00%	387,267	100.00%	Republican hold
District 8	217,922	50.88%	202,525	47.28%	7,897	1.84%	428,344	100.00%	Democratic hold
District 9	230,318	57.71%	153,296	38.41%	15,503	3.89%	399,117	100.00%	Democratic hold
District 10	138,179	33.72%	271,607	66.28%	0	0.00%	409,786	100.00%	Republican hold
District 11	226,128	50.20%	215,405	47.82%	8,940	1.98%	450,473	100.00%	Democratic hold
District 12	254,957	66.43%	117,719	30.67%	11,147	2.90%	383,823	100.00%	Democratic hold
District 13	223,205	78.08%	53,311	18.65%	9,369	3.28%	285,885	100.00%	Democratic hold
District 14	271,360	79.28%	62,664	18.31%	8,269	2.41%	342,303	100.00%	Democratic hold
Total	2,688,527	49.58%	2,617,881	48.27%	101,095	1.86%	5,423,140	100.00%	

Popular vote
Democratic	49.58%
Republican	48.27%
Other	1.86%

House seats
Democratic	50.00%
Republican	50.00%

== District 1 ==
2020 Michigan's 1st congressional district election
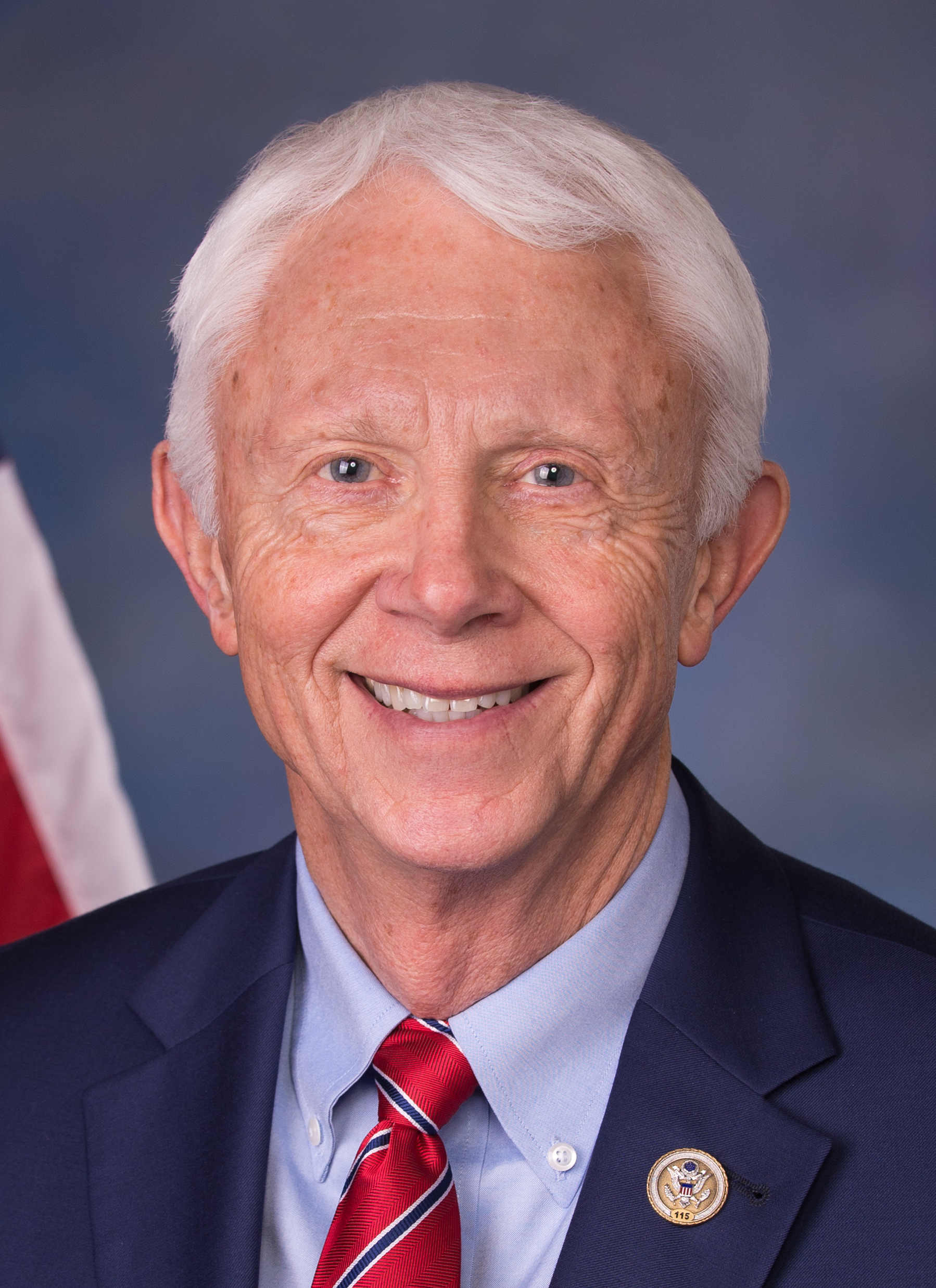

Nominee	Jack Bergman	Dana Ferguson
Party	Republican	Democratic
Popular vote	256,581	153,328
Percentage	61.7%	36.8%
- Bergman: 40–50% 50–60% 60–70% 70–80% 80–90% Ferguson: 40–50% 50–60% 60–70% 70–80% Tie: 50%
U.S. Representative before election
Jack Bergman
Republican
Elected U.S. Representative
Jack Bergman
Republican

The 1st district covers the Upper Peninsula and the northern part of the Lower Peninsula. The incumbent was Republican Jack Bergman, who was re-elected with 56.3% of the vote in 2018.

=== Republican primary ===
==== Candidates ====
===== Nominee =====
- Jack Bergman, incumbent U.S. representative

==== Primary results ====
Republican primary results
Party	Candidate	Votes	%
Republican	Jack Bergman (incumbent)	100,716	100.0
Total votes		100,716	100.0

=== Democratic primary ===
==== Candidates ====
===== Nominee =====
- Dana Ferguson, construction worker

===== Defeated in primary =====
- Linda O'Dell, former Wall Street research analyst and trader

==== Primary results ====
Democratic primary results
Party	Candidate	Votes	%
Democratic	Dana Ferguson	45,565	64.2
Democratic	Linda O'Dell	25,388	35.8
Total votes		70,953	100.0

=== Libertarian primary ===
==== Candidates ====
===== Declared =====
- Ben Boren, vice chair of the Michigan Libertarian Party

=== General election ===
==== Predictions ====
Source	Ranking	As of
The Cook Political Report	Safe R	July 2, 2020
Inside Elections	Safe R	June 2, 2020
Sabato's Crystal Ball	Safe R	July 2, 2020
Politico	Safe R	April 19, 2020
Daily Kos	Safe R	June 3, 2020
RCP	Safe R	June 9, 2020
Niskanen	Safe R	June 7, 2020

==== Results ====
2020 Michigan's 1st congressional district election
Party	Candidate	Votes	%
Republican	Jack Bergman (incumbent)	256,581	61.7
Democratic	Dana Ferguson	153,328	36.8
Libertarian	Ben Boren	6,310	1.5
Total votes		416,219	100.0
Republican hold			

== District 2 ==
2020 Michigan's 2nd congressional district election
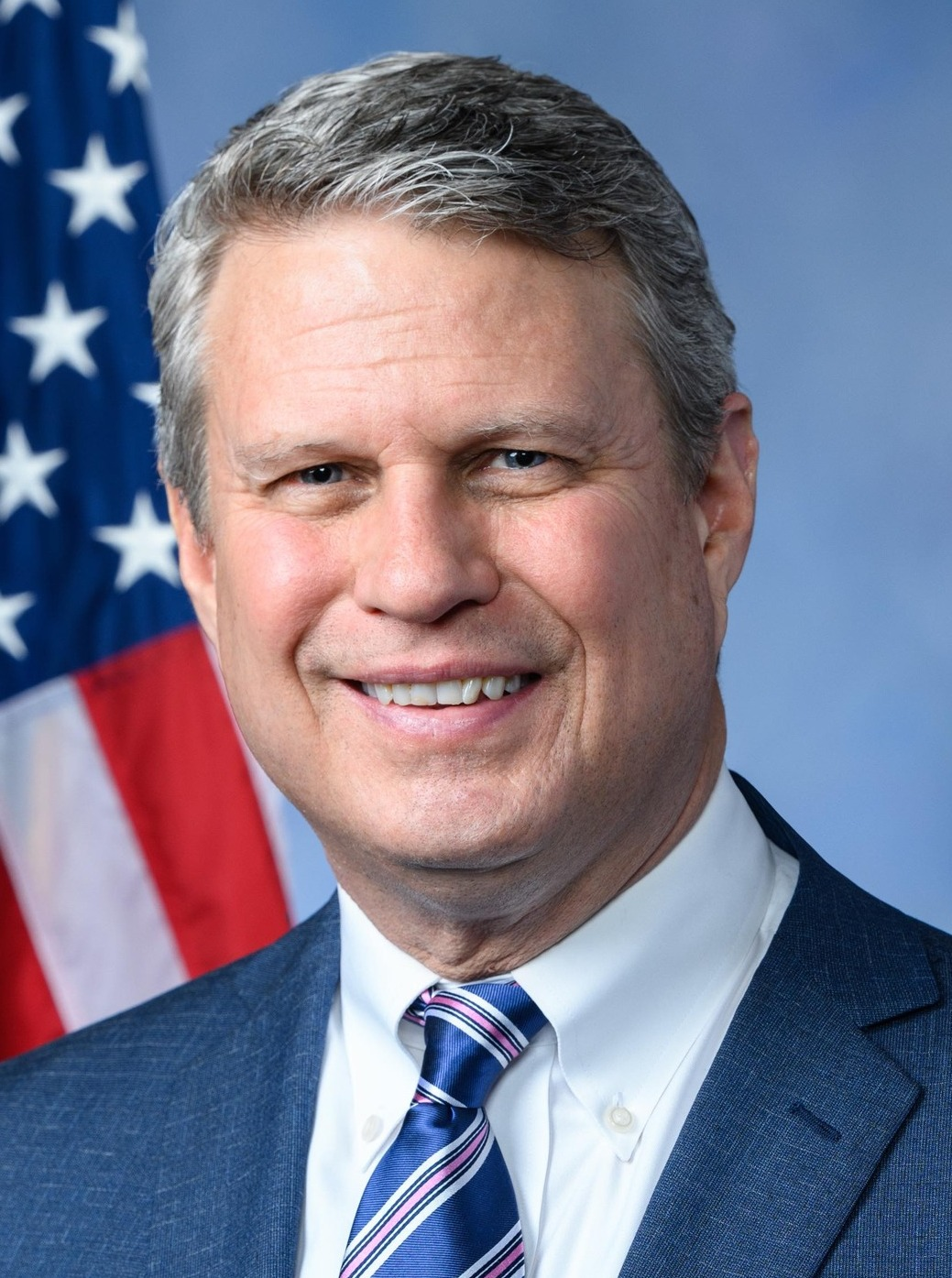

Nominee	Bill Huizenga	Bryan Berghoef
Party	Republican	Democratic
Popular vote	238,711	154,122
Percentage	59.2%	38.2%
- Huizenga: 40–50% 50–60% 60–70% 70–80% 80–90% Berghoef: 40–50% 50–60% 60–70% 70–80% 80–90% >90% Tie: 40–50% No data
U.S. Representative before election
Bill Huizenga
Republican
Elected U.S. Representative
Bill Huizenga
Republican

The 2nd district runs along the eastern shoreline of Lake Michigan taking in Lake, Muskegon, Oceana, Newaygo counties and parts of Mason County, and includes parts of the Grand Rapids suburbs, including Ottawa County and parts of Allegan and Kent counties. The incumbent was Republican Bill Huizenga, who was re-elected with 55.3% of the vote in 2018.

=== Republican primary ===
==== Candidates ====
===== Nominee =====
- Bill Huizenga, incumbent U.S. representative

==== Primary results ====
Republican primary results
Party	Candidate	Votes	%
Republican	Bill Huizenga (incumbent)	88,258	100.0
Total votes		88,258	100.0

=== Democratic primary ===
==== Candidates ====
===== Nominee =====
- Bryan Berghoef, United Church of Christ pastor

==== Primary results ====
Democratic primary results
Party	Candidate	Votes	%
Democratic	Bryan Berghoef	59,703	100.0
Total votes		59,703	100.0

=== Third parties ===
==== Declared ====
- Jean-Michael Creviere (Green), activist

=== General election ===
==== Predictions ====
Source	Ranking	As of
The Cook Political Report	Safe R	July 2, 2020
Inside Elections	Safe R	June 2, 2020
Sabato's Crystal Ball	Safe R	July 2, 2020
Politico	Safe R	April 19, 2020
Daily Kos	Safe R	June 3, 2020
RCP	Safe R	June 9, 2020
Niskanen	Safe R	June 7, 2020

==== Polling ====
Poll source	Date(s) administered	Sample size (Note: Key: A – all adults RV – registered voters LV – likely voters V – unclear)	Margin of error	Bill Huizenga (R)	Bryan Berghoef (D)	Other/ Undecided
Denno Research (D) (Note: Poll conducted for the Berghoef campaign.)	July 8–11, 2020	400 (LV)	–	49%	31%	20%

==== Results ====
2020 Michigan's 2nd congressional district election
Party	Candidate	Votes	%
Republican	Bill Huizenga (incumbent)	238,711	59.2
Democratic	Bryan Berghoef	154,122	38.2
Libertarian	Max Riekse	5,292	1.3
Green	Jean-Michel Crevière	2,646	0.7
U.S. Taxpayers'	Gerald Van Sickle	2,476	0.6
Total votes		403,247	100.0
Republican hold			

== District 3 ==
2020 Michigan's 3rd congressional district election
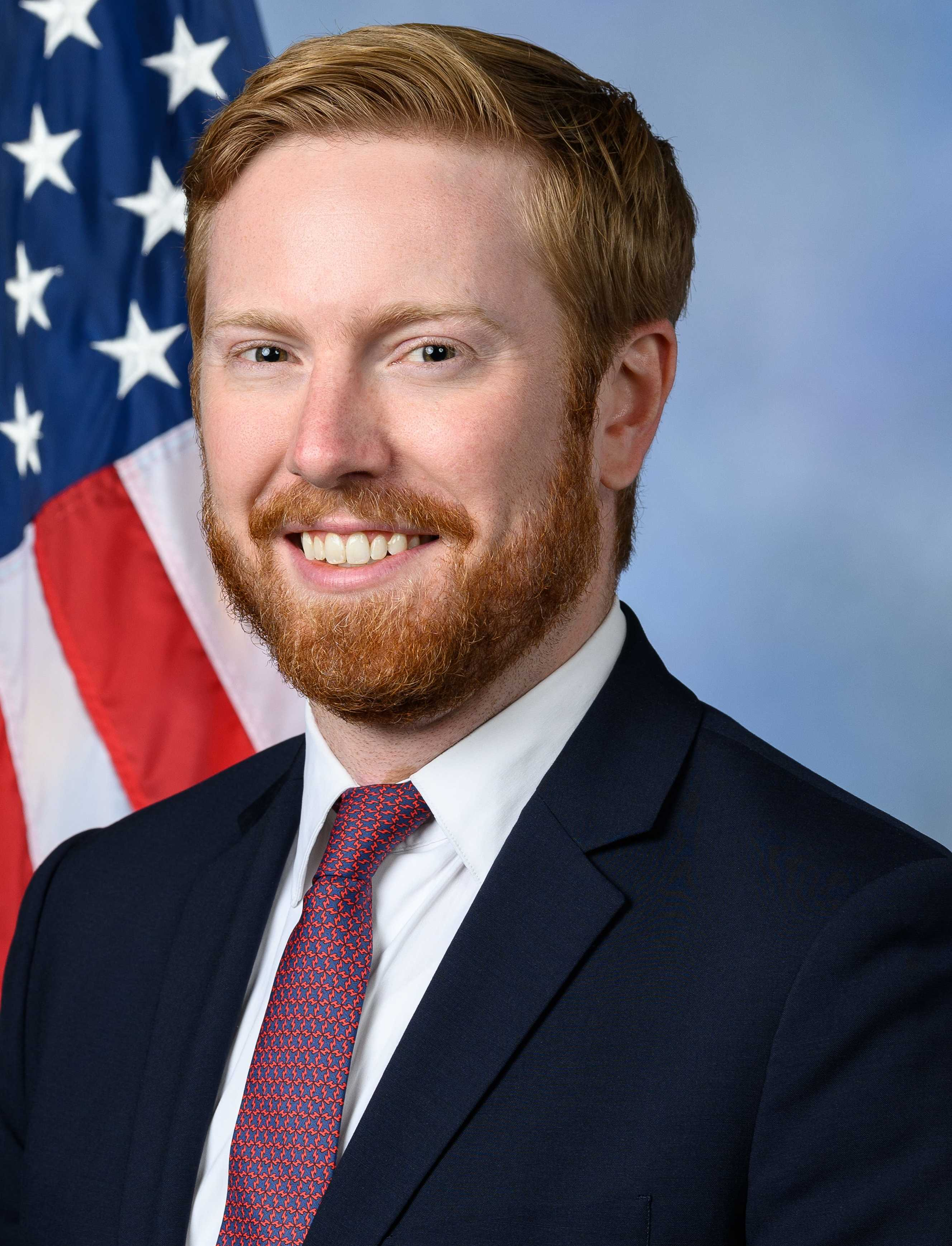

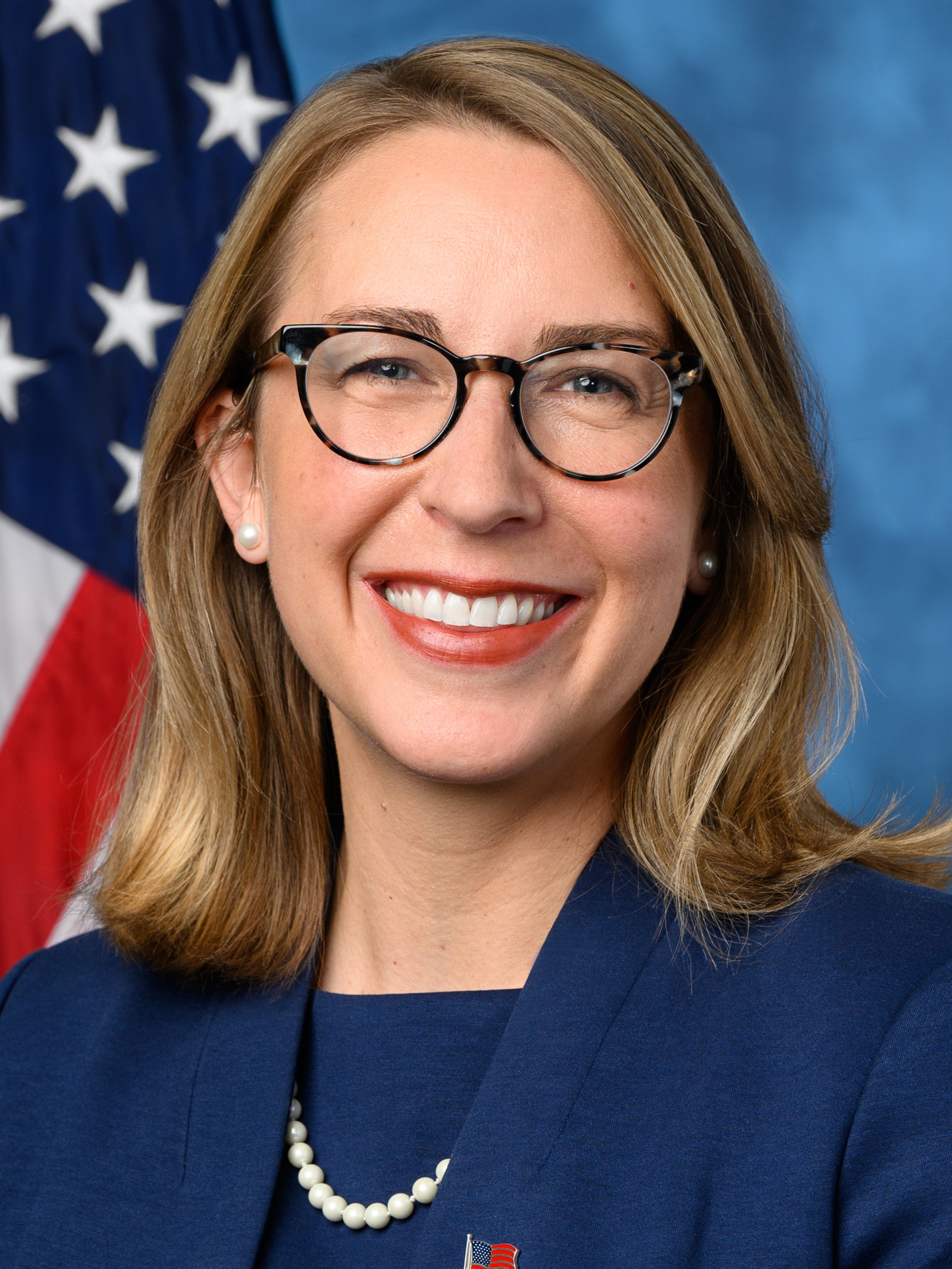
Nominee	Peter Meijer	Hillary Scholten
Party	Republican	Democratic
Popular vote	213,649	189,769
Percentage	53.0%	47.0%
- Meijer: 50–60% 60–70% 70–80% Scholten: 50–60% 60–70% 70–80% 80–90% >90% Tie: 50% No data
U.S. Representative before election
Justin Amash
Libertarian
Elected U.S. Representative
Peter Meijer
Republican

The 3rd district is based in western Michigan, and is home to the city of Grand Rapids. The incumbent was Libertarian Justin Amash, who was re-elected as a Republican with 54.4% of the vote in 2018, and announced that he was leaving the party on July 4, 2019. Amash decided on July 16, 2020, not to seek re-election to his House seat.

=== Republican primary ===
==== Candidates ====
===== Nominee =====
- Peter Meijer, U.S. Army veteran, business analyst, and heir to the Meijer superstore fortune

===== Defeated in primary =====
- Lynn Afendoulis, state representative
- Joe Farrington, bar owner
- Tom Norton, former village president and Afghanistan War veteran
- Emily Rafi, attorney

===== Withdrew =====
- Joel Langlois, businessman and president of the DeltaPlex Arena and Conference Center
- Jim Lower, state representative

===== Declined =====
- Jase Bolger, former speaker of the Michigan House of Representatives
- Brian Ellis, businessman and candidate for Michigan's 3rd congressional district in 2014

==== Endorsements ====
Lynn Afendoulis

State officials

- 25 state representatives

Organizations

- National Association of Realtors PAC
- Right to Life of Michigan PAC (co-endorsed with Peter Meijer)
- Susan B. Anthony List Candidate Fund PAC
Peter Meijer

Federal officials

- Dan Crenshaw, U.S. representative (TX-02)
- Richard Grenell, special presidential envoy for Serbia and Kosovo Peace Negotiations and former U.S. ambassador to Germany (2018–2020) and acting Director of National Intelligence (2020) (post-primary)
- Kevin McCarthy, U.S. representative (CA-23) and House minority leader and former House majority leader (2014–2019)
- Steve Scalise, U.S. representative (LA-01) and House minority whip

State officials

- Thomas Albert, state representative (originally endorsed Jim Lower)

Organizations

- Republican Main Street Partnership PAC
- Right to Life of Michigan PAC (co-endorsed with Lynn Afendoulis)
- Tea Party Express

Individuals

- DeVos family
- John E. James, Republican nominee in the 2018 and 2020 U.S. Senate elections in Michigan
- Peter Secchia, former U.S. ambassador to Italy and San Marino (1989-1993) and Republican National Committee vice chair
Jim Lower (withdrawn)

State officials

- Thomas Albert, state representative
- Judy Emmons, former state senator (2011–2019) and state representative (2003–2009)
- Mike Mueller, state representative
- Rick Outman, state senator and former state representative (2011–2017)
- Jason Wentworth, state representative and state House speaker pro tempore

==== Debates ====
2020 Michigan's 3rd congressional district Republican primary debates
No.	Date	Host	Moderator	Link	Republican	Republican	Republican	Republican	Republican
Key: P Participant A Absent N Not invited I Invited W Withdrawn									
Key: P Participant A Absent N Not invited I Invited W Withdrawn					Lynn Afendoulis	Joe Farrington	Peter Meijer	Tom Norton	Emily Rafi
1	Jul. 14, 2020	WOOD-TV	Rick Albin		P	P	P	P	I
2	Jul. 20, 2020	Grand Rapids; Chamber of Commerce	Andy Johnston		P	P	P	P	P

==== Polling ====
Poll source	Date(s) administered	Sample size	Margin of error	Lynn Afendoulis	Peter Meijer	Undecided
National Research Inc. (Note: Poll sponsored by Meijer's campaign)	June 15–16, 2020	400 (LV)	± 4.9%	17%	41%	–

Hypothetical polling

with Justin Amash and Jim Lower

Poll source	Date(s) administered	Sample size	Margin of error	Lynn Afendoulis	Justin Amash	Jim Lower	Peter Meijer	Tom Norton	Undecided
Strategic National	June 29 – July 1, 2019	400 (LV)	± 4.9%	17%	17%	27%	4%	5%	30%
Practical Political Consulting	June 5–9, 2019	335 (LV)	–	–	33%	49%	–	–	–

==== Primary results ====
Republican primary results
Party	Candidate	Votes	%
Republican	Peter Meijer	47,273	50.2
Republican	Lynn Afendoulis	24,579	26.1
Republican	Tom Norton	14,913	15.8
Republican	Joe Farrington	3,966	4.2
Republican	Emily Rafi	3,462	3.7
Total votes		94,193	100.0

=== Democratic primary ===
==== Candidates ====
===== Nominee =====
- Hillary Scholten, attorney

===== Failed to qualify =====
- Amanda Brunzell, Navy veteran

===== Withdrew =====
- Doug Booth, healthcare operations manager
- Nick Colvin, attorney
- Emily Rafi, attorney (running as a Republican)

===== Declined =====
- Cathy Albro, farmer and nominee for Michigan's 3rd congressional district in 2018

==== Endorsements ====
Hillary Scholten

U.S. presidents

- Barack Obama, 44th president of the United States (2009-2017), U.S. senator from Illinois (2005–2008)

U.S. vice presidents

- Joe Biden, 47th vice president of the United States and 2020 Democratic nominee for president

Federal officials

- Elizabeth Warren, U.S. senator from Massachusetts and 2020 Democratic presidential candidate

Organizations

- EMILY's List
- League of Conservation Voters
- Sierra Club

==== Primary results ====
Democratic primary results
Party	Candidate	Votes	%
Democratic	Hillary Scholten	65,008	100.0
Total votes		65,008	100.0

=== Libertarian primary ===
==== Candidates ====
===== Declined =====
- Justin Amash, incumbent U.S. representative

=== General election ===
==== Debate ====
2020 Michigan's 3rd congressional district debate
No.	Date	Host	Moderator	Link	Republican	Democratic
Key: P Participant A Absent N Not invited I Invited W Withdrawn						
Key: P Participant A Absent N Not invited I Invited W Withdrawn					Peter Meijer	Hillary Scholten
1	Oct. 1, 2020	WOOD-TV	Rick Albin		P	P

==== Predictions ====
Source	Ranking	As of
The Cook Political Report	Tossup	October 21, 2020
Inside Elections	Tossup	October 1, 2020
Sabato's Crystal Ball	Lean R (flip)	July 2, 2020
Politico	Tossup	April 19, 2020
Daily Kos	Tossup	October 29, 2020
RCP	Tossup	June 9, 2020
Niskanen	Tossup	June 7, 2020

==== Polling ====
Poll source	Date(s) administered	Sample size	Margin of error	Peter Meijer (R)	Hillary Scholten (D)	Undecided
Strategic National	October 15–17, 2020	400 (LV)	± 4.9%	46% (Note: With weighting by party ID)	46%	7%
Strategic National	October 15–17, 2020	400 (LV)	± 4.9%	42% (Note: Without weighting by party ID)	50%	8%
DCCC Targeting & Analytics Department (D) (Note: Poll sponsored by the DCCC.)	October 7–9, 2020	449 (LV)	± 4.9%	42%	47%	11%
National Research (R)	October 5–7, 2020	400 (LV)	± 4.9%	50%	43%	–
We Ask America	September 19–20, 2020	400 (LV)	± 4.9%	48%	41%	10%
ALG Research (D)	September 16–20, 2020	501 (LV)	± 4.4%	42%	44%	14%
Global Strategy Group (D)	September 8–10, 2020	400 (LV)	± 4.9%	41%	41%	18% (Note: Includes "Refused")
ALG Research (D) (Note: Poll sponsored by Scholten's campaign)	June 3–7, 2020	502 (LV)	± 4.4%	39%	40%	–

Hypothetical polling

with Lynn Afendoulis and Hillary Scholten

Poll source	Date(s) administered	Sample size	Margin of error	Lynn Afendoulis (R)	Hillary Scholten (D)	Undecided
ALG Research (D)	June 3–7, 2020	502 (LV)	± 4.4%	40%	40%	–

with Generic Republican and Generic Democrat

Poll source	Date(s) administered	Sample size	Margin of error	Generic Republican	Generic Democrat	Other	Undecided
ALG Research (D)	September 16–20, 2020	501 (LV)	± 4.4%	42%	45%	–	–
GSG (D)	September 8–10, 2020	400 (LV)	± 4.9%	40%	45%	3% (Note: "Refused" with 3%)	12%
DCCC Targeting & Analytics (D)	February 24–25, 2020	405 (LV)	–	45%	47%	–	–

==== Results ====
2020 Michigan's 3rd congressional district election
Party	Candidate	Votes	%
Republican	Peter Meijer	213,649	53.0
Democratic	Hillary Scholten	189,769	47.0
Independent	Richard Fuentes (write-in)	1	0.0
Total votes		403,419	100.0
Republican gain from Libertarian			

== District 4 ==
2020 Michigan's 4th congressional district election
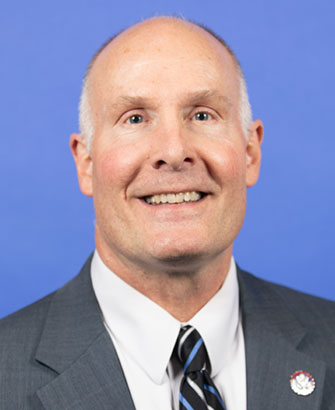

Nominee	John Moolenaar	Jerry Hilliard
Party	Republican	Democratic
Popular vote	242,621	120,802
Percentage	65.0%	32.4%
- Moolenaar: 40–50% 50–60% 60–70% 70–80% 80–90% Hilliard: 40–50% 50–60% 60–70% No data
U.S. Representative before election
John Moolenaar
Republican
Elected U.S. Representative
John Moolenaar
Republican

The 4th district encompasses central Michigan, including Midland and Mount Pleasant. The incumbent was Republican John Moolenaar, who was re-elected with 62.6% of the vote in 2018.

=== Republican primary ===
==== Candidates ====
===== Nominee =====
- John Moolenaar, incumbent U.S. representative

==== Primary results ====
Republican primary results
Party	Candidate	Votes	%
Republican	John Moolenaar (incumbent)	97,653	100.0
Total votes		97,653	100.0

=== Democratic primary ===
==== Candidates ====
===== Nominee =====
- Jerry Hilliard, teacher and nominee for this seat in 2018

===== Defeated in primary =====
- Anthony Feig, Central Michigan University professor

==== Primary results ====
Democratic primary results
Party	Candidate	Votes	%
Democratic	Jerry Hilliard	26,616	54.1
Democratic	Anthony Feig	22,594	45.9
Total votes		49,210	100.0

=== General election ===
==== Predictions ====
Source	Ranking	As of
The Cook Political Report	Safe R	July 2, 2020
Inside Elections	Safe R	June 2, 2020
Sabato's Crystal Ball	Safe R	July 2, 2020
Politico	Safe R	April 19, 2020
Daily Kos	Safe R	June 3, 2020
RCP	Safe R	June 9, 2020
Niskanen	Safe R	June 7, 2020

==== Results ====
2020 Michigan's 4th congressional district election
Party	Candidate	Votes	%
Republican	John Moolenaar (incumbent)	242,621	65.0
Democratic	Jerry Hilliard	120,802	32.4
Libertarian	David Canny	5,374	1.4
Green	Amy Slepr	4,448	1.2
Total votes		373,245	100.0
Republican hold			

== District 5 ==
2020 Michigan's 5th congressional district election
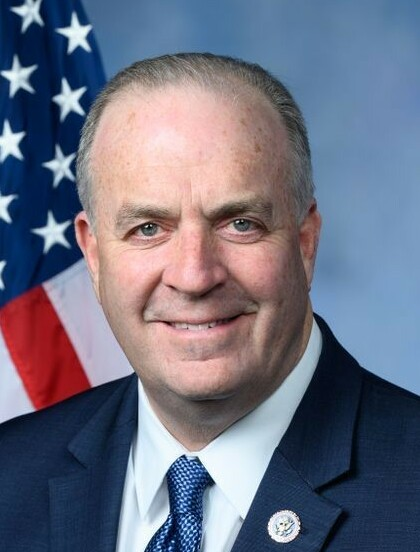

Nominee	Dan Kildee	Tim Kelly
Party	Democratic	Republican
Popular vote	196,599	150,772
Percentage	54.4%	41.8%
- Kildee: 40–50% 50–60% 60–70% 70–80% 80–90% >90% Kelly: 40–50% 50–60% 60–70% 70–80% No data
U.S. Representative before election
Dan Kildee
Democratic
Elected U.S. Representative
Dan Kildee
Democratic

The 5th district takes in the Saginaw Bay, including Bay City, Saginaw, and Flint. The incumbent was Democrat Dan Kildee, who was re-elected with 59.5% of the vote in 2018.

=== Democratic primary ===
==== Candidates ====
===== Nominee =====
- Dan Kildee, incumbent U.S. representative

==== Primary results ====
Democratic primary results
Party	Candidate	Votes	%
Democratic	Dan Kildee (incumbent)	91,288	100.0
Total votes		91,288	100.0

=== Republican primary ===
==== Candidates ====
===== Nominee =====
- Tim Kelly, former state representative and former Saginaw County commissioner

===== Defeated in primary =====
- Earl Lackie

===== Withdrew =====
- Christina Fitchett-Hickson

==== Primary results ====
Republican primary results
Party	Candidate	Votes	%
Republican	Tim Kelly	37,545	79.3
Republican	Earl Lackie	9,822	20.7
Total votes		47,367	100.0

=== General election ===
==== Predictions ====
Source	Ranking	As of
The Cook Political Report	Safe D	July 2, 2020
Inside Elections	Safe D	June 2, 2020
Sabato's Crystal Ball	Safe D	July 2, 2020
Politico	Likely D	April 19, 2020
Daily Kos	Safe D	June 3, 2020
RCP	Safe D	June 9, 2020
Niskanen	Safe D	June 7, 2020

==== Results ====
2020 Michigan's 5th congressional district election
Party	Candidate	Votes	%
Democratic	Dan Kildee (incumbent)	196,599	54.4
Republican	Tim Kelly	150,772	41.8
Working Class	Kathy Goodwin	8,180	2.3
Libertarian	James Harris	5,481	1.5
Total votes		361,032	100.0
Democratic hold			

== District 6 ==
2020 Michigan's 6th congressional district election
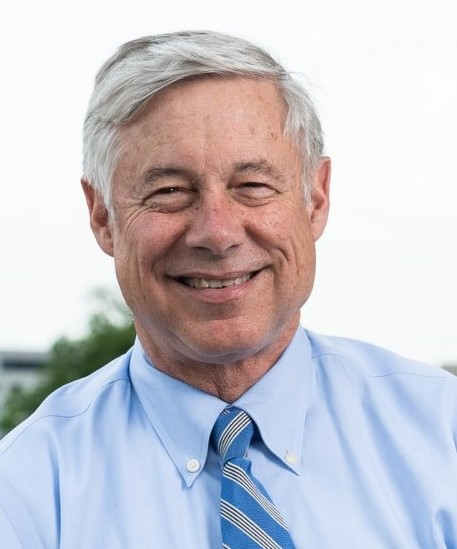

Nominee	Fred Upton	Jon Hoadley
Party	Republican	Democratic
Popular vote	211,496	152,085
Percentage	55.8%	40.1%
- Upton: 40–50% 50–60% 60–70% 70–80% 80–90% Hoadley: 40–50% 50–60% 60–70% 70–80% 80–90% >90% Tie: 40–50% No data
U.S. Representative before election
Fred Upton
Republican
Elected U.S. Representative
Fred Upton
Republican

The 6th district is based in southwest Michigan, including all of Berrien, Cass, Kalamazoo, St. Joseph, and Van Buren counties, as well as most of Allegan County. The incumbent was Republican Fred Upton, who was re-elected with 50.2% of the vote in 2018.

=== Republican primary ===
==== Candidates ====
===== Nominee =====
- Fred Upton, incumbent U.S. representative

===== Defeated in primary =====
- Elena Oelke, real estate agent

==== Primary results ====
Republican primary results
Party	Candidate	Votes	%
Republican	Fred Upton (incumbent)	53,495	62.7
Republican	Elena Oelke	31,884	37.3
Total votes		85,379	100.0

=== Democratic primary ===
==== Candidates ====
===== Nominee =====
- Jon Hoadley, state representative

===== Defeated in primary =====
- Jen Richardson, teacher

===== Declined =====
- Matt Longjohn, physician and nominee for Michigan's 6th congressional district in 2018

==== Endorsements ====
Jon Hoadley

U.S. presidents

- Barack Obama, 44th president of the United States (2009-2017), U.S. senator from Illinois (2005-2008)

U.S. vice presidents

- Joe Biden, 47th vice president of the United States and 2020 Democratic nominee for president

Federal officials

- Kamala Harris, U.S. senator from California; 2020 vice presidential nominee
- Pramila Jayapal, U.S. representative for Washington's 7th congressional district
- Mark Schauer, former U.S. representative for Michigan's 7th congressional district (2009-2011) and Democratic nominee for 2014 Michigan gubernatorial election

State officials

- Garlin Gilchrist, lieutenant governor of Michigan
- Sean McCann, state senator and former state representative
- Dana Nessel, Michigan attorney general
- Gretchen Whitmer, governor of Michigan

Local officials

- Abdul El-Sayed, former executive director of the Detroit Health Department (2015-2017) and 2018 Michigan gubernatorial candidate
- Andrew Gillum, former mayor of Tallahassee, Florida (2014-2018) and Democratic nominee for 2018 Florida gubernatorial election
- Bobby Hopewell, former mayor of Kalamazoo (2007-2019)

Individuals

- Mondaire Jones, 2020 Democratic nominee for New York's 17th congressional district

Labor unions

- AFT Michigan
- BAC Local 2
- Communication Workers of America Local 4123 and Region 4
- Insulators Local 47
- International Brotherhood of Electrical Workers Local 131
- Michigan Education Association
- Michigan Nurses Association
- Michigan Pipe Trades Association
- National Education Association
- SMART Local 7
- Southwest Michigan Building Trades
- United Association Local 357
- United Food and Commercial Workers Local 951

Organizations

- Brand New Congress
- Clean Water Action
- CPC PAC
- Democracy for America
- End Citizens United
- Equality PAC
- Human Rights Campaign
- League of Conservation Voters
- LGBTQ Victory Fund
- NARAL
- People for the American Way
- Planned Parenthood Action Fund
- Progressive Change Campaign Committee
- Sierra Club

==== Primary results ====
Democratic primary results
Party	Candidate	Votes	%
Democratic	Jon Hoadley	33,976	52.2
Democratic	Jen Richardson	31,061	47.8
Total votes		65,037	100.0

=== General election ===
==== Predictions ====
Source	Ranking	As of
The Cook Political Report	Lean R	August 6, 2020
Inside Elections	Likely R	June 2, 2020
Sabato's Crystal Ball	Lean R	July 2, 2020
Politico	Lean R	April 19, 2020
Daily Kos	Likely R	June 3, 2020
RCP	Lean R	June 9, 2020
Niskanen	Lean R	June 7, 2020

==== Polling ====
Poll source	Date(s) administered	Sample size	Margin of error	Fred Upton (R)	Jon Hoadley (D)	Undecided
LOC Wick (D) (Note: LOC Wick is an arm of the Left of Center PAC which supports Democratic candidates)	August 25–28, 2020	400 (LV)	± 4.9%	46%	40%	14%
RMG Research/Term Limits	July 30 – August 6, 2020	500 (RV)	± 4.5%	36%	40%	23%
Victoria Research and Consulting (D) (Note: Poll sponsored by Hoadley's campaign)	May 2–5, 2020	400 (LV)	± 4.9%	37%	38%	25%

Hypothetical polling

with Fred Upton and Jen Richardson

Poll source	Date(s) administered	Sample size	Margin of error	Fred Upton (R)	Jen Richardson (D)	Undecided
Gravis Marketing (D) (Note: Poll conducted for Richardson's campaign.)	July 16, 2020	604 (LV)	± 4.0%	36%	56%	8%

with generic Republican and generic Democrat

Poll source	Date(s) administered	Sample size	Margin of error	Generic Republican	Generic Democrat	Undecided
Gravis Marketing (D) (Note: Poll conducted for Richardson's campaign.)	July 16, 2020	604 (LV)	± 4.0%	46%	43%	11%

==== Results ====
2020 Michigan's 6th congressional district election
Party	Candidate	Votes	%
Republican	Fred Upton (incumbent)	211,496	55.8
Democratic	Jon Hoadley	152,085	40.1
Libertarian	Jeff DePoy	10,399	2.7
Green	John Lawrence	4,440	1.2
Independent	Jerry Solis (write-in)	560	0.2
Total votes		378,980	100.0
Republican hold			

== District 7 ==
2020 Michigan's 7th congressional district election
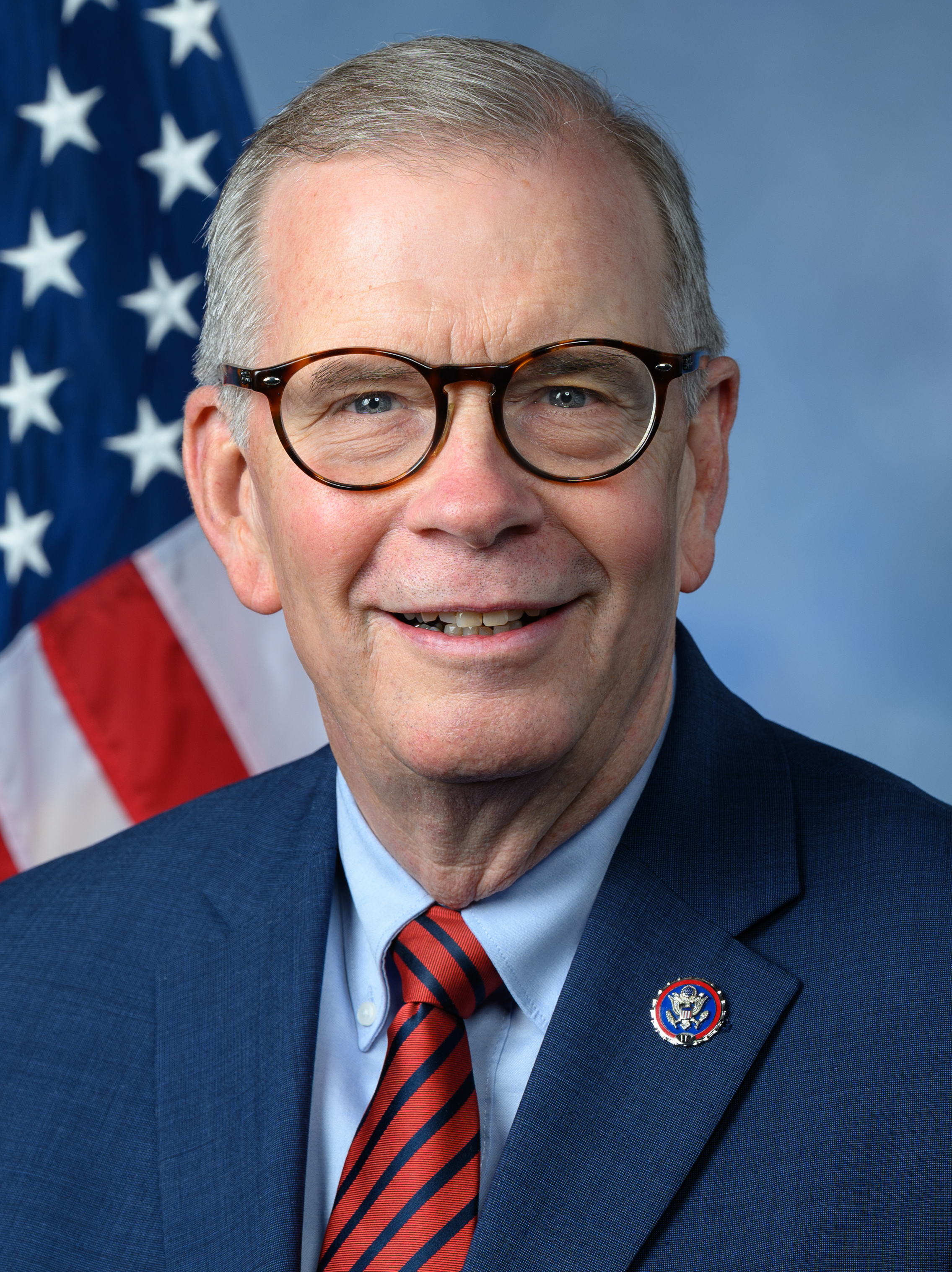

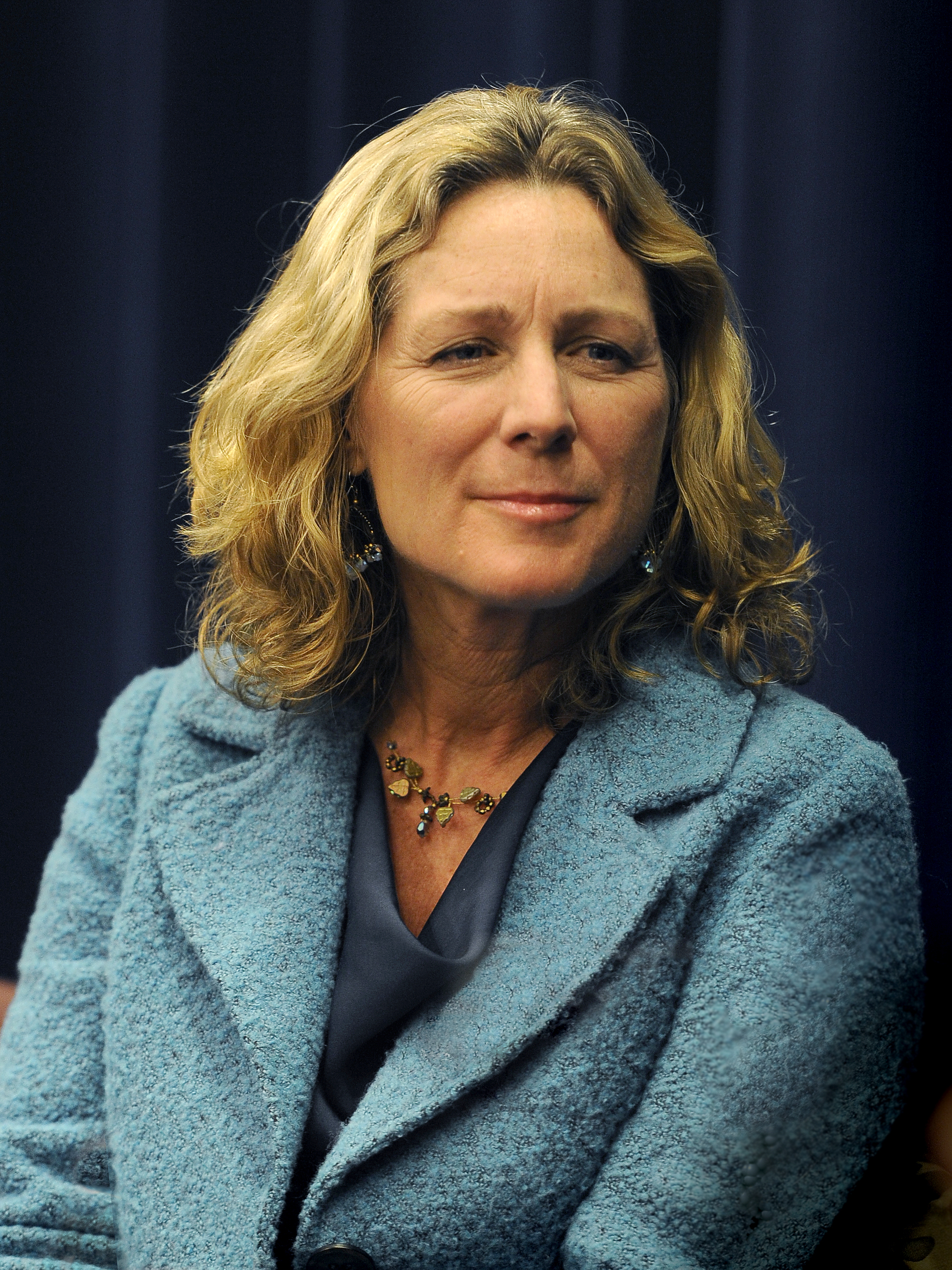
Nominee	Tim Walberg	Gretchen Driskell
Party	Republican	Democratic
Popular vote	227,524	159,743
Percentage	58.7%	41.3%
- Walberg: 50–60% 60–70% 70–80% 80–90% Driskell: 50–60% 60–70% 70–80% 80–90% Tie: 50% No data
U.S. Representative before election
Tim Walberg
Republican
Elected U.S. Representative
Tim Walberg
Republican

The 7th district is based in southeast Michigan, taking in the western suburbs of Ann Arbor, Monroe County, as well as parts of Lansing in Eaton County. The incumbent was Republican Tim Walberg, who was re-elected with 53.8% of the vote in 2018.

=== Republican primary ===
==== Candidates ====
===== Nominee =====
- Tim Walberg, incumbent U.S. representative

==== Primary results ====
Republican primary results
Party	Candidate	Votes	%
Republican	Tim Walberg (incumbent)	84,397	100.0
Total votes		84,397	100.0

=== Democratic primary ===
==== Candidates ====
===== Nominee =====
- Gretchen Driskell, former state representative, former mayor of Saline, and nominee for Michigan's 7th congressional district in 2016 and 2018

===== Failed to qualify =====
- Samuel Branscum
- Ryan Hall

==== Primary results ====
Democratic primary results
Party	Candidate	Votes	%
Democratic	Gretchen Driskell	63,470	100.0
Total votes		63,470	100.0

=== General election ===
==== Predictions ====
Source	Ranking	As of
The Cook Political Report	Safe R	July 2, 2020
Inside Elections	Safe R	June 2, 2020
Sabato's Crystal Ball	Safe R	July 2, 2020
Politico	Likely R	April 19, 2020
Daily Kos	Safe R	June 3, 2020
RCP	Safe R	June 9, 2020
Niskanen	Safe R	June 7, 2020

==== Results ====
2020 Michigan's 7th congressional district election
Party	Candidate	Votes	%
Republican	Tim Walberg (incumbent)	227,524	58.7
Democratic	Gretchen Driskell	159,743	41.3
Total votes		387,627	100.0
Republican hold			

== District 8 ==
2020 Michigan's 8th congressional district election
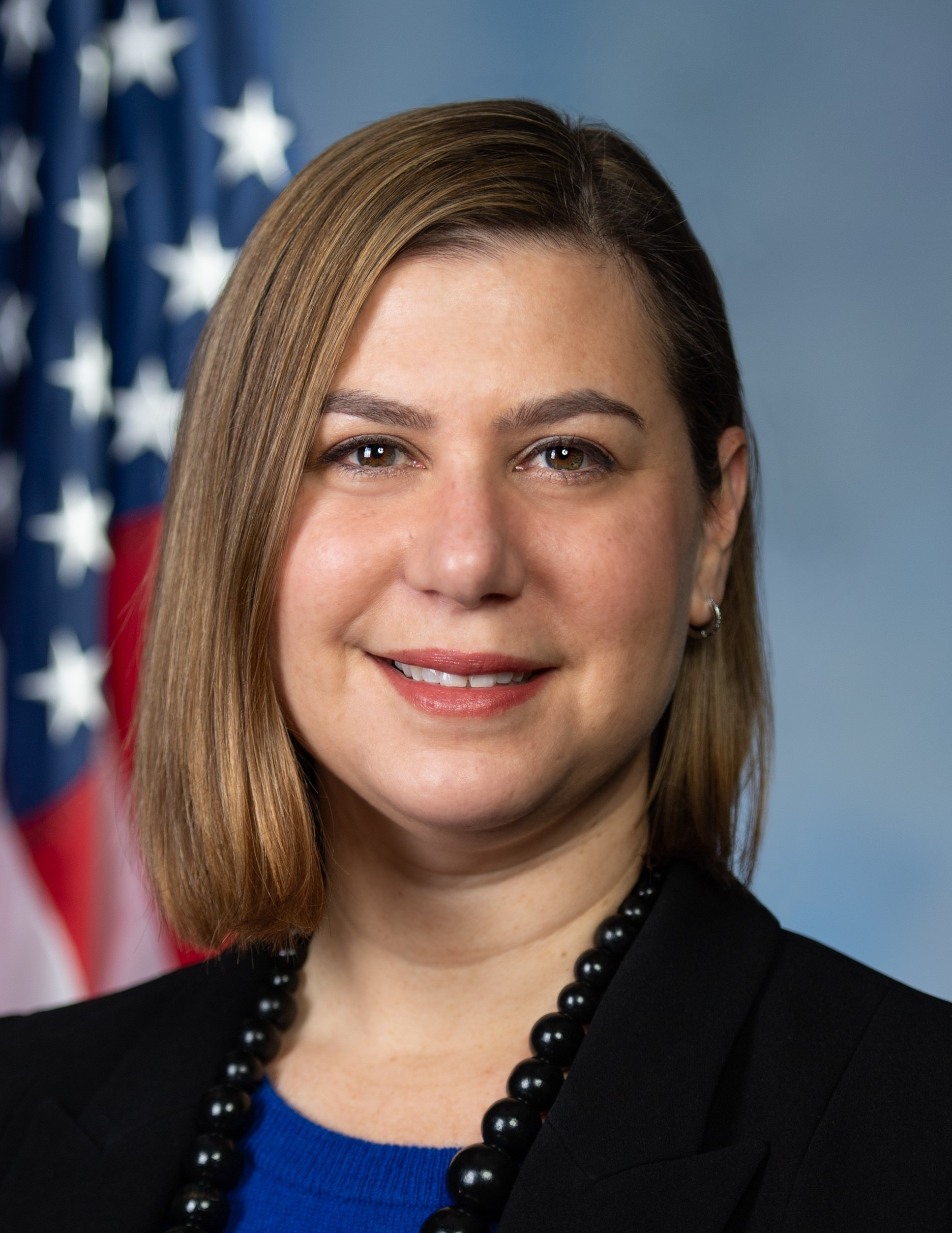

Nominee	Elissa Slotkin	Paul Junge
Party	Democratic	Republican
Popular vote	217,922	202,525
Percentage	50.9%	47.3%
- Slotkin: 40–50% 50–60% 60–70% 70–80% 80–90% >90% Junge: 40–50% 50–60% 60–70% No data
U.S. Representative before election
Elissa Slotkin
Democratic
Elected U.S. Representative
Elissa Slotkin
Democratic

The 8th district is based in southeast Michigan, including most of Lansing as well as Oakland County, including Rochester. The incumbent was Democrat Elissa Slotkin, who flipped the district and was elected with 50.6% of the vote in 2018. The Cook Political Report rated this contest as 'lean Democratic'.

=== Democratic primary ===
==== Candidates ====
===== Nominee =====
- Elissa Slotkin, incumbent U.S. representative

==== Endorsements ====
Elissa Slotkin

U.S. presidents

- Barack Obama, 44th president of the United States (2009-2017), U.S. senator from Illinois (2005-2008)

Individuals

- Etan Cohen, writer and director

Organizations

- League of Conservation Voters Action Fund
- Sierra Club

==== Primary results ====
Democratic primary results
Party	Candidate	Votes	%
Democratic	Elissa Slotkin (incumbent)	90,570	100.0
Total votes		90,570	100.0

=== Republican primary ===
==== Candidates ====
===== Nominee =====
- Paul Junge, former news anchor for FOX 47 News and former external affairs director at ICE

===== Eliminated in primary =====
- Mike Detmer, businessman and former president of Young Republicans
- Alan Hoover, U.S. Marine Corps veteran
- Kristina Lyke, criminal defense attorney

===== Disqualified =====
- Nikki Snyder, Michigan Department of Education board member and registered nurse

===== Declined =====
- Tom Barrett, state senator
- Mike Bishop, former U.S. representative
- Joe Hune, former state senator
- Meghan Reckling, chair of the Livingston County Republican Party
- Lana Theis, state senator

==== Endorsements ====
Paul Junge

U.S. representatives

- Tim Walberg, U.S. representative from Michigan's 7th congressional district

State legislators

- Bill Rogers, former state representatives (2009–2014)

Local officials

- Mike Murphy, Livingston County sheriff

Organizations

- American Conservative Union

==== Primary results ====
Republican primary results
Party	Candidate	Votes	%
Republican	Paul Junge	30,525	35.1
Republican	Mike Detmer	24,863	28.6
Republican	Kristina Lyke	22,093	25.4
Republican	Alan Hoover	9,461	10.9
Total votes		86,942	100.0

=== Libertarian primary ===
==== Candidates ====
===== Declared =====
- Joe Hartman, tax advisor

=== General election ===
==== Predictions ====
Source	Ranking	As of
The Cook Political Report	Lean D	July 2, 2020
Inside Elections	Safe D	August 7, 2020
Sabato's Crystal Ball	Likely D	October 15, 2020
Politico	Lean D	October 11, 2020
Daily Kos	Likely D	October 29, 2020
RCP	Lean D	June 9, 2020
Niskanen	Safe D	June 7, 2020

==== Results ====
2020 Michigan's 8th congressional district election
Party	Candidate	Votes	%
Democratic	Elissa Slotkin (incumbent)	217,922	50.9
Republican	Paul Junge	202,525	47.3
Libertarian	Joe Hartman	7,897	1.8
Total votes		428,344	100.0
Democratic hold			

== District 9 ==
2020 Michigan's 9th congressional district election
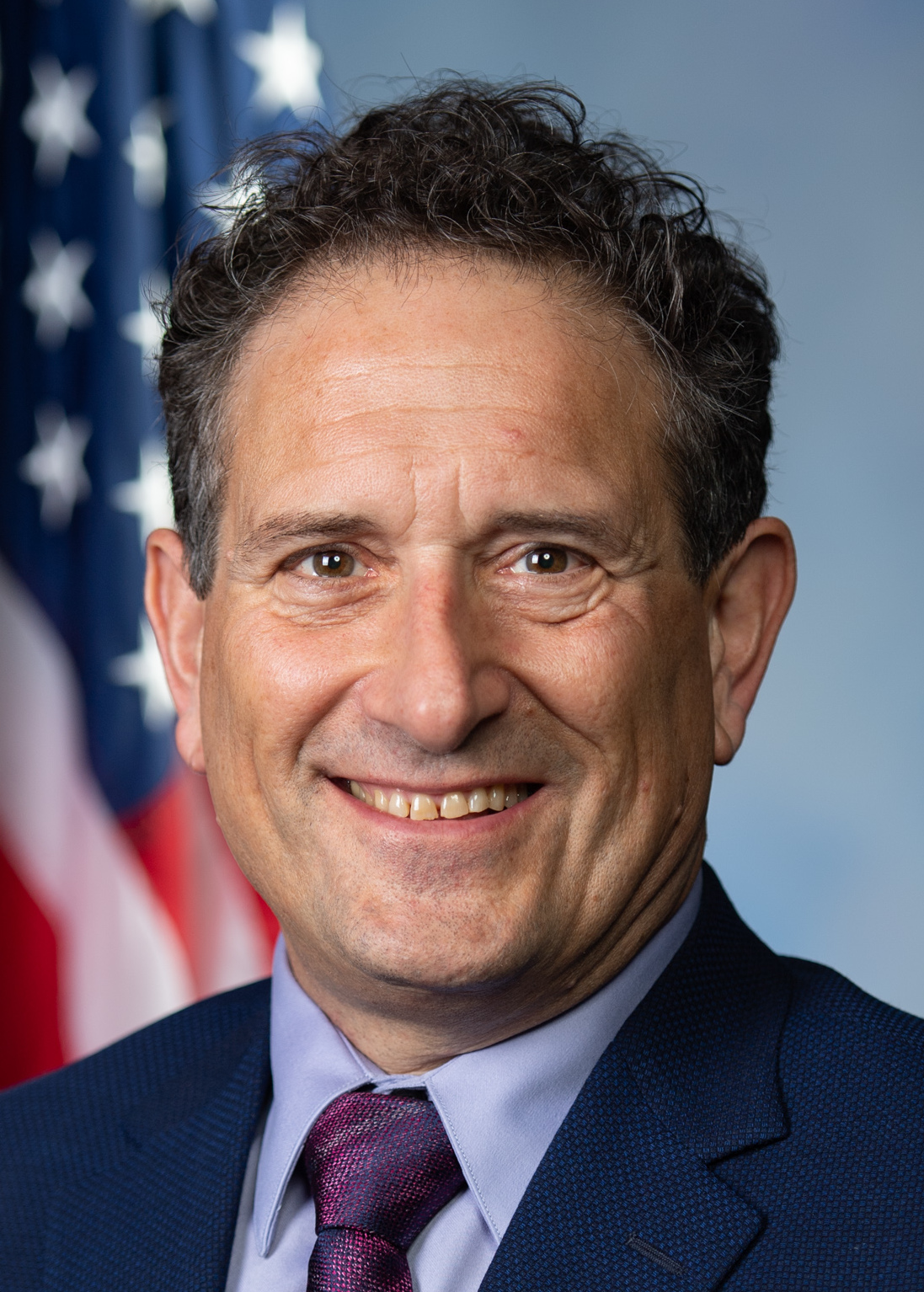

Nominee	Andy Levin	Charles Langworthy
Party	Democratic	Republican
Popular vote	230,318	153,296
Percentage	57.7%	38.4%
- Levin: 40–50% 50–60% 60–70% 70–80% 80–90% Langworthy: 40–50% 50–60% 60–70% Tie: 40–50% No data
U.S. Representative before election
Andy Levin
Democratic
Elected U.S. Representative
Andy Levin
Democratic

The 9th district is centered around the northern suburbs of Detroit, taking in southeastern Oakland County and southern Macomb County, including the cities of Royal Oak and Warren. The incumbent was Democrat Andy Levin, who was elected with 59.7% of the vote in 2018.

=== Democratic primary ===
==== Nominee ====
- Andy Levin, incumbent U.S. representative

==== Primary results ====
Democratic primary results
Party	Candidate	Votes	%
Democratic	Andy Levin (incumbent)	103,202	100.0
Total votes		103,202	100.0

=== Republican primary ===
==== Nominee ====
- Charles Langworthy, U.S. Navy veteran

===== Defeated in primary =====
- Gabi Grossbard, former car salesman

==== Primary results ====
Republican primary results
Party	Candidate	Votes	%
Republican	Charles Langworthy	32,084	57.4
Republican	Gabi Grossbard	23,846	42.6
Republican	Douglas Troszak (write-in)	1	0.0
Total votes		55,931	100.0

=== General election ===
==== Predictions ====
Source	Ranking	As of
The Cook Political Report	Safe D	July 2, 2020
Inside Elections	Safe D	June 2, 2020
Sabato's Crystal Ball	Safe D	July 2, 2020
Politico	Safe D	April 19, 2020
Daily Kos	Safe D	June 3, 2020
RCP	Safe D	June 9, 2020
Niskanen	Safe D	June 7, 2020

==== Results ====
2020 Michigan's 9th congressional district election
Party	Candidate	Votes	%
Democratic	Andy Levin (incumbent)	230,318	57.7
Republican	Charles Langworthy	153,296	38.4
Working Class	Andrea Kirby	8,970	2.3
Libertarian	Mike Saliba	6,532	1.6
Independent	Douglas Troszak (write-in)	1	0.0
Total votes		399,117	100.0
Democratic hold			

== District 10 ==
2020 Michigan's 10th congressional district election
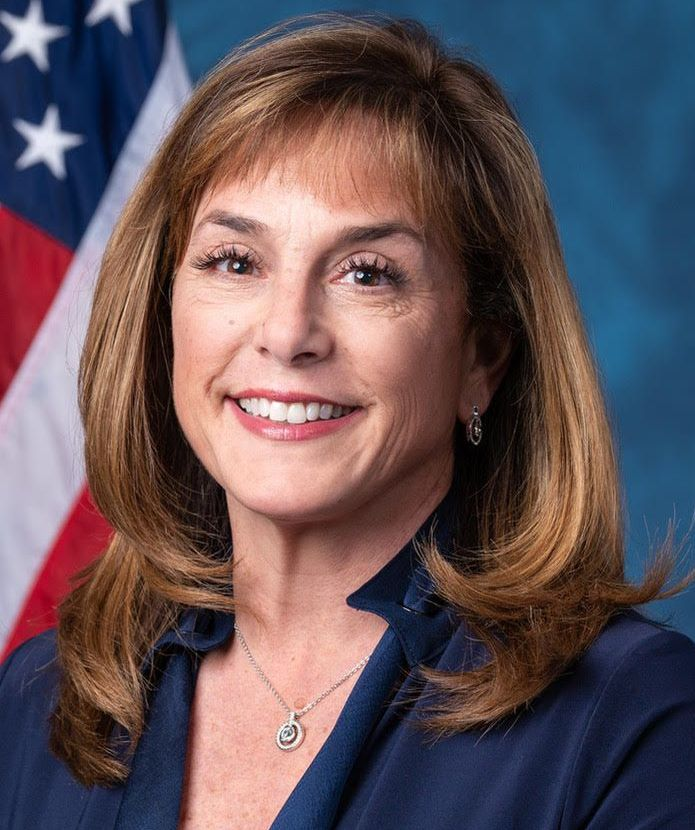

Nominee	Lisa McClain	Kimberly Bizon
Party	Republican	Democratic
Popular vote	271,607	138,179
Percentage	66.3%	33.7%
- McClain: 50–60% 60–70% 70–80% 80–90% >90% Bizon: 50–60% 60–70%
U.S. Representative before election
Paul Mitchell
Republican
Elected U.S. Representative
Lisa McClain
Republican

The 10th district takes in the eastern Lower Peninsula region known as the Thumb, consisting of Huron County, Lapeer County, St. Clair County, and Sanilac County as well as most of northern Macomb County and eastern Tuscola County. The incumbent was Republican Paul Mitchell, who was re-elected with 60.8% of the vote in 2018, and subsequently announced he would not seek re-election on July 24, 2019, due to health issues.

=== Republican primary ===
==== Candidates ====
===== Nominee =====
- Lisa McClain, finance executive

===== Defeated in primary =====
- Shane Hernandez, state representative
- Doug Slocum, retired brigadier general

===== Failed to qualify =====
- Brandon Mikula
- Richard Piwko
- Bisham Singh

===== Declined =====
- Kevin Daley, state senator
- Dan Lauwers, state senator
- Pete Lucido, state senator
- Pete Lund, former state representative
- Mike MacDonald, state senator
- Candice Miller, Macomb County Public Works commissioner and former U.S. representative
- Paul Mitchell, incumbent U.S. representative
- Phil Pavlov, state senator and candidate for Michigan's 10th congressional district in 2016

==== Endorsements ====
Shane Hernandez

Federal officials

- Ted Cruz, U.S. senator from Texas
- Kevin McCarthy, U.S. representative (CA-23), House minority leader, and former House majority leader (2014-2019)
- Paul Mitchell, U.S. representative (MI-10)

State officials

- Jack Brandenburg, former state senator (2011–2019) and state representative (2003–2008)
- Phil Green, state representative
- Pamela Hornberger, state representative
- Doug Wozniak, state representative

Organizations

- Americans for Prosperity (AFP) Action
- Associated Builders and Contractors (ABC) of Michigan PAC
- Club for Growth PAC
- Gun Owners of America
- Right to Life of Michigan PAC (co-endorsed with Lisa McClain and Doug Slocum)
- Tea Party Express

Newspapers

- Detroit News

Individuals

- Ted Nugent, guitarist and singer-songwriter
Lisa McClain

State officials

- Peter Lucido, state senator and former state representative (2015–2018)
- Paul Muxlow, former state representative (2011–2016)

Organizations

- Maggie's List
- Right to Life of Michigan PAC (co-endorsed with Shane Hernandez and Doug Slocum)

Individuals

- David Clarke, former sheriff of Milwaukee County, Wisconsin (2002–2017)
Doug Slocum

State officials

- Rick Snyder, former governor (2011–2019)

Organizations

- National Association of Realtors PAC
- Right to Life of Michigan PAC (co-endorsed with Shane Hernandez and Lisa McClain)

Newspapers

- Detroit Free Press

==== Polling ====
Poll source	Date(s) administered	Sample size	Margin of error	Shane Hernandez	Lisa McClain	Doug Slocum	Undecided
WPA Intelligence (Note: Poll sponsored by Club for Growth, which endorsed Hernandez prior to the sampling period)	July 14–15, 2020	400 (LV)	± 4.9%	33%	27%	10%	30%
WPA Intelligence	June 15–16, 2020	– (V) (Note: Not yet released)	–	27%	32%	12%	29%

==== Primary results ====
Republican primary results
Party	Candidate	Votes	%
Republican	Lisa McClain	50,927	41.7
Republican	Shane Hernandez	44,526	36.4
Republican	Doug Slocum	26,750	21.9
Total votes		122,203	100.0

=== Democratic primary ===
==== Candidates ====
===== Nominee =====
- Kimberly Bizon, nominee for Michigan's 10th congressional district in 2018

===== Defeated in primary =====
- Kelly Noland, U.S. Army veteran and former nurse

===== Failed to qualify =====
- Don Wellington, former Treasury Department policy advisor

==== Primary results ====
Democratic primary results
Party	Candidate	Votes	%
Democratic	Kimberly Bizon	27,971	53.7
Democratic	Kelly Noland	24,085	46.3
Total votes		52,056	100.0

=== General election ===
==== Predictions ====
Source	Ranking	As of
The Cook Political Report	Safe R	July 2, 2020
Inside Elections	Safe R	June 2, 2020
Sabato's Crystal Ball	Safe R	July 2, 2020
Politico	Safe R	April 19, 2020
Daily Kos	Safe R	June 3, 2020
RCP	Safe R	June 9, 2020
Niskanen	Safe R	June 7, 2020

==== Endorsements ====
Kimberly Bizon (D)

Organizations

- Sierra Club

==== Results ====
2020 Michigan's 10th congressional district election
Party	Candidate	Votes	%
Republican	Lisa McClain	271,607	66.3
Democratic	Kimberly Bizon	138,179	33.7
Total votes		409,786	100.0
Republican hold			

== District 11 ==
2020 Michigan's 11th congressional district election
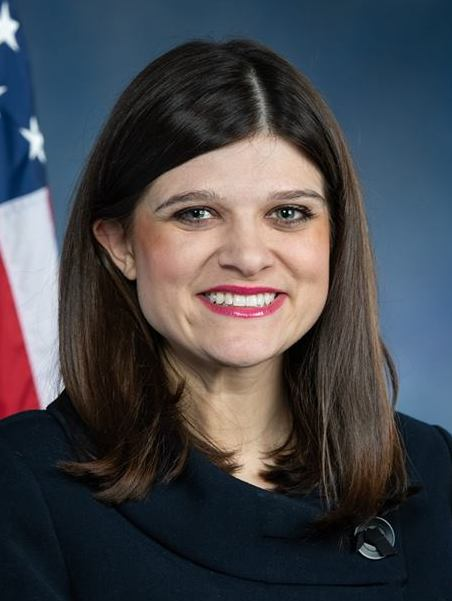

Nominee	Haley Stevens	Eric Esshaki
Party	Democratic	Republican
Popular vote	226,128	215,405
Percentage	50.2%	47.8%
- Stevens: 40–50% 50–60% 60–70% 70–80% Esshaki: 40–50% 50–60% 60–70% 70–80% Tie: 40–50%
U.S. Representative before election
Haley Stevens
Democratic
Elected U.S. Representative
Haley Stevens
Democratic

The 11th district is situated northwest of Detroit, comprising portions of northwestern Wayne and southwestern Oakland counties. The incumbent was Democrat Haley Stevens, who flipped the district and was elected with 51.8% of the vote in 2018.

=== Democratic primary ===
==== Candidates ====
===== Nominated =====
- Haley Stevens, incumbent U.S. representative

==== Primary results ====
Democratic primary results
Party	Candidate	Votes	%
Democratic	Haley Stevens (incumbent)	105,251	100.0
Total votes		105,251	100.0

=== Republican primary ===
==== Candidates ====
===== Nominee =====
- Eric Esshaki, attorney

===== Defeated in primary =====
- Frank Acosta, businessman
- Kerry Bentivolio, former U.S. representative (2013–2015)
- Carmelita Greco, entrepreneur
- Whittney Williams, auto show product specialist and former model

===== Failed to qualify =====
- Scott Keller

==== Primary results ====
Republican primary results
Party	Candidate	Votes	%
Republican	Eric Esshaki	26,991	31.0
Republican	Carmelita Greco	19,869	22.9
Republican	Kerry Bentivolio	18,794	21.6
Republican	Frank Acosta	11,030	12.7
Republican	Whittney Williams	10,251	11.8
Republican	Eric Sandberg (write-in)	5	0.0
Total votes		86,940	100.0

==== Endorsements ====
Haley Stevens (D)

U.S. presidents

- Barack Obama, 44th president of the United States (2009–2017), U.S. senator from Illinois (2005–2008)

Organizations

- EMILY's List
- End Citizens United
- League of Conservation Voters Action Fund
- NARAL Pro-Choice America
- Planned Parenthood Action Fund
- Sierra Club
Eric Esshaki (R)

U.S. presidents

- Donald Trump, 45th president of the United States

=== General election ===
==== Predictions ====
Source	Ranking	As of
The Cook Political Report	Lean D	July 2, 2020
Inside Elections	Safe D	August 7, 2020
Sabato's Crystal Ball	Likely D	July 2, 2020
Politico	Lean D	April 19, 2020
Daily Kos	Likely D	June 3, 2020
RCP	Lean D	June 9, 2020
Niskanen	Safe D	June 7, 2020

==== Results ====
2020 Michigan's 11th congressional district election
Party	Candidate	Votes	%
Democratic	Haley Stevens (incumbent)	226,128	50.2
Republican	Eric Esshaki	215,405	47.8
Libertarian	Leonard Schwartz	8,936	2.0
Independent	Frank Acosta (write-in)	4	0.0
Total votes		450,473	100.0
Democratic hold			

== District 12 ==
2020 Michigan's 12th congressional district election
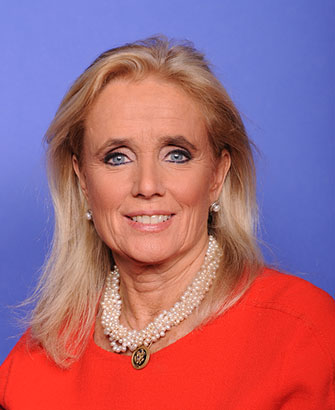

Nominee	Debbie Dingell	Jeff Jones
Party	Democratic	Republican
Popular vote	254,957	117,719
Percentage	66.4%	30.7%
- Dingell: 40–50% 50–60% 60–70% 70–80% 80–90% >90% Jones: 40–50% 50–60%
U.S. Representative before election
Debbie Dingell
Democratic
Elected U.S. Representative
Debbie Dingell
Democratic

The 12th district, under its current borders, is located in the southeastern region of the lower peninsula, stretching from Detroit's western suburbs to Ann Arbor. It includes portions of Washtenaw and Wayne counties. The incumbent was Democrat Debbie Dingell, who was re-elected with 68.1% of the vote in 2018.

=== Democratic primary ===
==== Candidates ====
===== Nominee =====
- Debbie Dingell, incumbent U.S. representative

===== Defeated in primary =====
- Solomon Rajput, medical student and founding member of the Michigan Resistance

===== Withdrawn =====
- Anthony Carbonaro, small business owner and convict

==== Endorsements ====
Debbie Dingell

Organizations

- League of Conservation Voters
- NARAL Pro-Choice America
- Planned Parenthood Action Fund
- Sierra Club
Solomon Rajput

Organizations

- Democratic Socialists of America - University of Michigan chapter

==== Primary results ====
Democratic primary results
Party	Candidate	Votes	%
Democratic	Debbie Dingell (incumbent)	103,953	80.9
Democratic	Solomon Rajput	24,497	19.1
Total votes		128,450	100.0

=== Republican primary ===
==== Candidates ====
===== Nominee =====
- Jeff Jones, nominee for Michigan's 12th congressional district in 2016 and 2018

==== Primary results ====
Republican primary results
Party	Candidate	Votes	%
Republican	Jeff Jones	34,718	100.0
Total votes		34,718	100.0

=== General election ===
==== Predictions ====
Source	Ranking	As of
The Cook Political Report	Safe D	July 2, 2020
Inside Elections	Safe D	June 2, 2020
Sabato's Crystal Ball	Safe D	July 2, 2020
Politico	Safe D	April 19, 2020
Daily Kos	Safe D	June 3, 2020
RCP	Safe D	June 9, 2020
Niskanen	Safe D	June 7, 2020

==== Results ====
2020 Michigan's 12th congressional district election
Party	Candidate	Votes	%
Democratic	Debbie Dingell (incumbent)	254,957	66.4
Republican	Jeff Jones	117,719	30.7
Working Class	Gary Walkowicz	11,147	2.9
Total votes		383,823	100.0
Democratic hold			

== District 13 ==
2020 Michigan's 13th congressional district election
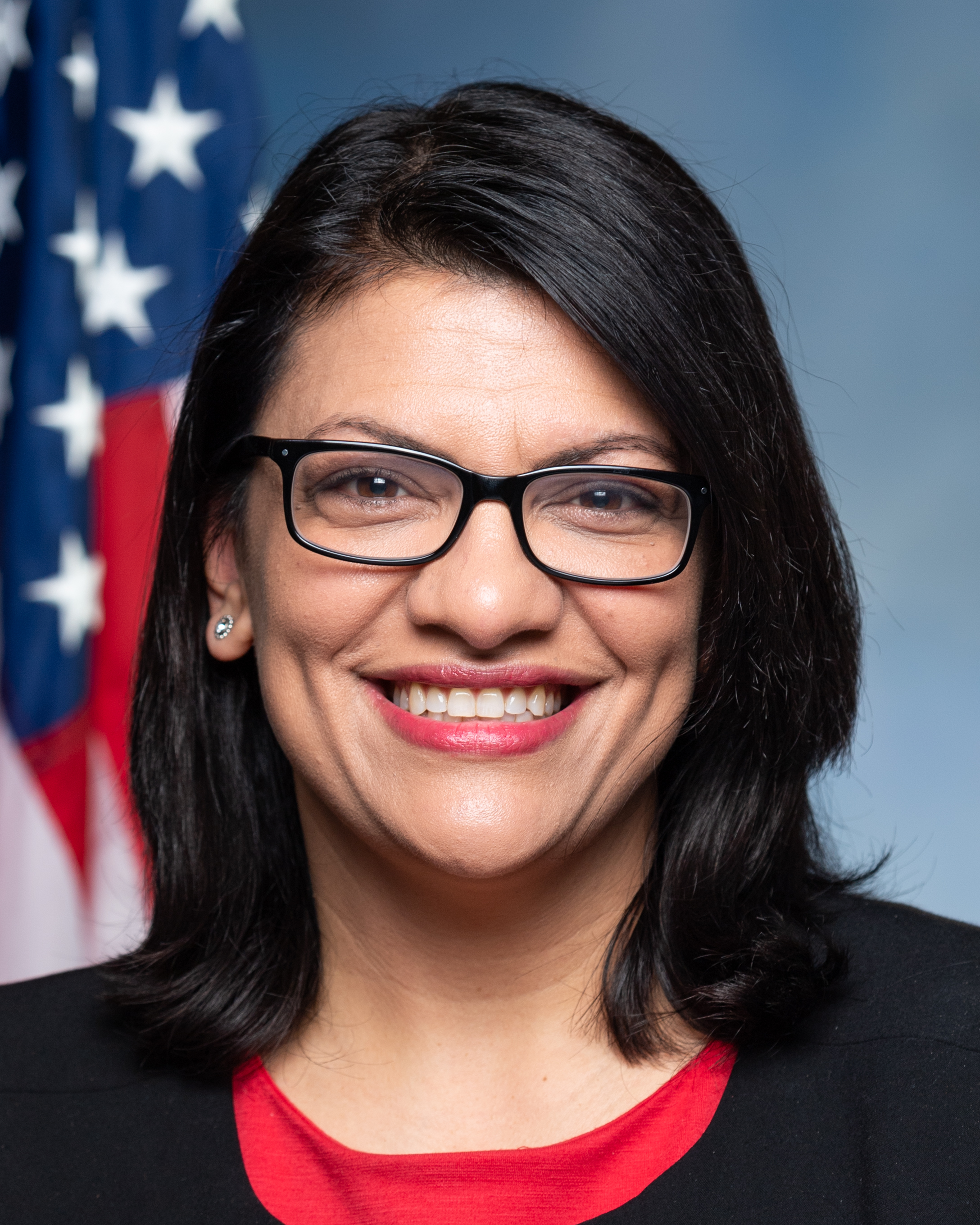

Nominee	Rashida Tlaib	David Dudenhoefer
Party	Democratic	Republican
Popular vote	223,205	53,311
Percentage	78.1%	18.7%
- Precinct results Tlaib: 40–50% 50–60% 60–70% 70–80% 80–90% >90% Dudenhoefer: 40–50% 50–60% 60–70% No data
U.S. Representative before election
Rashida Tlaib
Democratic
Elected U.S. Representative
Rashida Tlaib
Democratic

The 13th district is located entirely within Wayne County, including parts of western Detroit and its suburbs. The incumbent was Democrat Rashida Tlaib, who was elected with 84.2% of the vote in 2018 without major-party opposition.

=== Democratic primary ===
==== Nominee ====
- Rashida Tlaib, incumbent U.S. representative

==== Defeated in primary ====
- Brenda Jones, former U.S. representative and president of the Detroit City Council

===== Declined =====
- Sharon McPhail, former Detroit city councilwoman
- Benny Napoleon, Wayne County sheriff

===== Endorsements =====
Brenda Jones

State officials

- Ian Conyers, former state senator (2016–2018) and 2018 Democratic candidate in MI-13
- Shanelle Jackson, 2018 Democratic candidate in MI-13 and former state representative (2007–2012)
- Coleman Young II, former state senator (2011–2019), 2018 Democratic candidate in MI-13, and former state representative (2007–2010)

Newspapers

- Michigan Chronicle
Rashida Tlaib

Federal officials

- Alexandria Ocasio-Cortez, U.S. representative (NY-14)
- Ilhan Omar, U.S. representative (MN-05)
- Nancy Pelosi, U.S. representative (CA-12) and House Speaker
- Ayanna Pressley, U.S. representative (MA-07)
- Bernie Sanders, U.S. senator from Vermont, 2020 Democratic presidential candidate, and former U.S. representative (VT-AL) (1991–2007) (Independent)

Labor unions

- AFSCME Council 25
- Michigan AFL–CIO
- Michigan Education Association
- National Education Association
- National Nurses United

Organizations

- Brand New Congress
- Democracy for America
- Democratic Socialists of America
- IfNotNow
- Jewish Voice for Peace
- Justice Democrats
- League of Conservation Voters Action Fund
- Metro Detroit Democratic Socialists of America
- MoveOn
- National Iranian American Council (NIAC) Action
- Planned Parenthood Action Fund
- Sierra Club
- Sunrise Movement
- Working Families Party

Newspapers

- Detroit Free Press

Individuals

- Noura Erakat, human rights attorney and Rutgers University assistant professor

==== Polling ====
Poll source	Date(s) administered	Sample size	Margin of error	Rashida Tlaib	Brenda Jones	Undecided
Target Insyght	July 20–22, 2020	500 (LV)	± 4.5%	52%	24%	23%
Data for Progress (Note: Poll released after the primary in August)	July 16–22, 2020	182 (LV)	–	58%	30%	12%
Target Insyght	March 31 – April 2, 2020	600 (LV)	± 4.0%	43%	34%	33%
Target Insyght	July 23–25, 2019	600 (LV)	± 4.0%	56%	19%	25%

==== Primary results ====
Democratic primary results by precinct Tlaib: 50–60%; 60–70%; 70–80%; 80–90%; >90%; Jones: 50–60%; 80–90%; Other: 50% Tie; No votes

Democratic primary results
Party	Candidate	Votes	%
Democratic	Rashida Tlaib (incumbent)	71,703	66.3
Democratic	Brenda Jones	36,493	33.7
Total votes		108,196	100.0

=== Republican primary ===
==== Candidates ====
===== Nominee =====
- David Dudenhoefer, district chair for the 13th Congressional District Republican Committee

===== Defeated in primary =====
- Al Lemmo, retired engineer
- Linda Sawyer, nurse

==== Primary results ====
Republican primary results
Party	Candidate	Votes	%
Republican	David Dudenhoefer	6,833	47.6
Republican	Linda Sawyer	4,955	34.5
Republican	Al Lemmo	2,574	17.9
Total votes		14,362	100.0

=== General election ===
==== Predictions ====
Source	Ranking	As of
The Cook Political Report	Safe D	July 2, 2020
Inside Elections	Safe D	June 2, 2020
Sabato's Crystal Ball	Safe D	July 2, 2020
Politico	Safe D	April 19, 2020
Daily Kos	Safe D	June 3, 2020
RCP	Safe D	June 9, 2020
Niskanen	Safe D	June 7, 2020

==== Results ====
2020 Michigan's 13th congressional district election
Party	Candidate	Votes	%
Democratic	Rashida Tlaib (incumbent)	223,205	78.1
Republican	David Dudenhoefer	53,311	18.7
Working Class	Sam Johnson	5,284	1.8
Green	D. Etta Wilcoxon	2,105	0.7
U.S. Taxpayers'	Articia Bomer	1,974	0.7
Independent	Donald Eason (write-in)	6	0.0
Total votes		285,885	100.0
Democratic hold			

== District 14 ==
2020 Michigan's 14th congressional district election
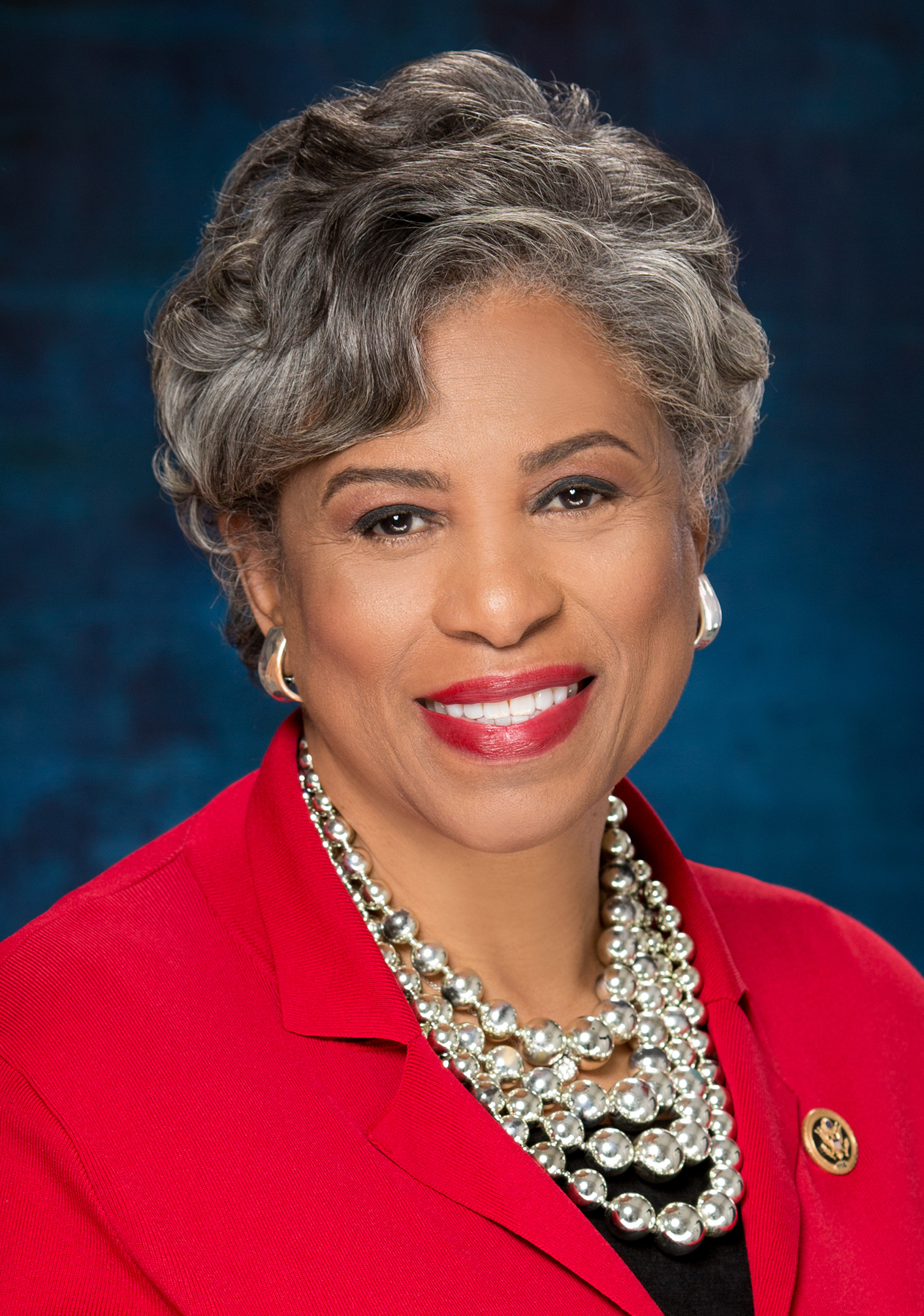

Nominee	Brenda Lawrence	Robert Patrick
Party	Democratic	Republican
Popular vote	271,370	62,664
Percentage	79.3%	18.3%
- Lawrence: 40–50% 50–60% 60–70% 70–80% 80–90% >90% Patrick: 50–60% 60–70% 70–80% Tie: 40–50% No data
U.S. Representative before election
Brenda Lawrence
Democratic
Elected U.S. Representative
Brenda Lawrence
Democratic

The 14th district spans from eastern Detroit to Pontiac, taking in Farmington Hills and Southfield. The incumbent was Democrat Brenda Lawrence, who was re-elected with 80.9% in 2018.

=== Democratic primary ===
==== Nominee ====
- Brenda Lawrence, incumbent U.S. representative

==== Defeated in primary ====
- Terrance Morrison, retired Detroit public works official and candidate for Michigan's 14th congressional district in 2016

==== Primary results ====
Democratic primary results
Party	Candidate	Votes	%
Democratic	Brenda Lawrence (incumbent)	127,006	93.2
Democratic	Terrance Morrison	9,264	6.8
Total votes		136,270	100.0

=== Republican primary ===
==== Nominee ====
- Robert Patrick, building contractor

==== Defeated in primary ====
- Daryle F. Houston

==== Primary results ====
Republican primary results
Party	Candidate	Votes	%
Republican	Robert Patrick	12,481	65.4
Republican	Daryle F. Houston	6,597	34.6
Total votes		19,078	100.0

=== General election ===
==== Predictions ====
Source	Ranking	As of
The Cook Political Report	Safe D	July 2, 2020
Inside Elections	Safe D	June 2, 2020
Sabato's Crystal Ball	Safe D	July 2, 2020
Politico	Safe D	April 19, 2020
Daily Kos	Safe D	June 3, 2020
RCP	Safe D	June 9, 2020
Niskanen	Safe D	June 7, 2020

==== Results ====
Michigan's 14th congressional district, 2020
Party	Candidate	Votes	%
Democratic	Brenda Lawrence (incumbent)	271,370	79.3
Republican	Robert Patrick	62,664	18.3
Libertarian	Lisa Lane Gioia	3,737	1.1
Working Class	Philip Kolody	2,534	0.7
Green	Clyde Shabazz	1,998	0.6
Total votes		342,303	100.0
Democratic hold			

== See also ==
- 2020 Michigan elections

== Notes ==
Partisan clients
