= Emily Young McQueen =

American wheelchair racer (born 1981)

Emily Young McQueen (born 1981) is an American wheelchair racer. She won her first marathon in St. George, Utah and qualified for the Boston Marathon on October 3, 2009. Her first competitive race was the Fifth Third River Bank Run in Grand Rapids, MI where she placed second in her division. She later competed in the Crim Festival of Races in Flint, MI and took first place in her division.
