= Michigan's 82nd House of Representatives district =

American legislative district

Michigan's 82nd State House of Representatives district
Representative
Kristian Grant; D–Grand Rapids
- Demographics: 50.4% White; 25.8% Black; 14.1% Hispanic; 3.5% Asian; 0.2% Native American; 0.6% Other; 5.3% Multiracial
- Population (2024): 90,631

Michigan's 82nd House of Representatives district (also referred to as Michigan's 82nd House district) is a legislative district within the Michigan House of Representatives located in part of Kent County. The district was created in 1965, when the Michigan House of Representatives district naming scheme changed from a county-based system to a numerical one.

== List of representatives ==
Representative	Party	Dates	Residence	Notes
Albert R. Horrigan	Democratic	1965–1970	Flint	
F. Robert Edwards	Republican	1971–1972	Flint	
Bobby Crim	Democratic	1973–1982	Davison	
Thomas E. Scott	Democratic	1983–1992	Flint	
Karen S. Willard	Democratic	1993–1998	Algonac	Lived in Clay Township until around 1993 to 1996.
Judson Gilbert II	Republican	1999–2002	Algonac	
John E. Stahl	Republican	2003–2008	North Branch	
Kevin Daley	Republican	2009–2014	Lum	
Todd Courser	Republican	2015	Lapeer	Resigned amid scandal.
Gary Howell	Republican	2016–2022	North Branch	
Kristian Grant	Democratic	2023–present	Grand Rapids	

== Recent elections ==
=== 2020s ===
2026 Michigan House of Representatives election
Party	Candidate	Votes	%
Democratic	Kristian C. Grant (incumbent)	29,527	80.18
Republican	Ryan Malinoski	7,297	19.82
Total votes		36,824	100
Democratic hold			

2018 Michigan House of Representatives election
Party	Candidate	Votes	%
Republican	Gary Howell	26,616	69.80
Democratic	Christopher Giles	11,516	30.20
Total votes		38,132	100
Republican hold			

2016 Michigan House of Representatives election
Party	Candidate	Votes	%
Republican	Gary Howell	29,962	68.95%
Democratic	Margaret Guerrero DeLuca	13,492	31.05%
Total votes		43,454	100.00%
Republican hold			

2016 Michigan House of Representatives special election
Party	Candidate	Votes	%
Republican	Gary Howell	13,907	58.6
Democratic	Margaret Guerrero DeLuca	8,680	36.6
Libertarian	Tracy Spilker	1,154	4.9
Total votes		23,741	
Republican hold			

2014 Michigan House of Representatives election
Party	Candidate	Votes	%
Republican	Todd Courser	15,698	55.09
Democratic	Margaret Guerrero-DeLuca	12,797	44.91
Total votes		28,495	100.0
Republican hold			

2012 Michigan House of Representatives election
Party	Candidate	Votes	%
Republican	Kevin Daley	24,482	58.97
Democratic	John Nugent	17,032	41.03
Total votes		41,514	100.0
Republican hold			

2010 Michigan House of Representatives election
Party	Candidate	Votes	%
Republican	Kevin Daley	20,338	70.77
Democratic	Mark Monson	8,401	29.23
Total votes		28,739	100.0
Republican hold			

2008 Michigan House of Representatives election
Party	Candidate	Votes	%
Republican	Kevin Daley	24,655	57.26
Democratic	Bill Marquardt	18,406	42.74
Total votes		43,061	100.0
Republican hold			

== Historical district boundaries ==
Map	Description	Apportionment Plan	Notes
	Genesee County (part): Flint (part)	1964 Apportionment Plan	
	Genesee County (part): Burton Township; Davison; Davison Township; Genesee Township (part); Mount Morris; Mount Morris Township (part); Richfield Township	1972 Apportionment Plan	
	Genesee County (part): Atlas Township; Burton; Davison; Davison Township; Genesee Township (part); Mount Morris; Richfield Township	1982 Apportionment Plan	
	Lapeer County (part): Almont Township; Attica Township; Dryden Township; Imlay City; Imlay Township; Lapeer; Lapeer Township; Metamora Township; St. Clair County (part): Algonac; Berlin Township; Brockway Township; Casco Township; Clay Township; Columbus Township; Cottrellville Township; Emmett Township; Grant Township; Greenwood Township; Ira Township; Kenockee Township; Lynn Township; Marine City; Memphis; Mussey Township; Riley Township; Wales Township; Yale	1992 Apportionment Plan	
	Lapeer County	2001 Apportionment Plan	
	Lapeer County	2011 Apportionment Plan	
