= Cathy O'Brien (runner) =

American long-distance runner

Cathy Schiro O'Brien (born July 19, 1967, in Janesville, Wisconsin) is a retired female long-distance runner from the United States. She was an Olympian, and she holds the US women's high school record in the marathon. O'Brien set her personal best (2:29:38) in the women's marathon when she won the women's Los Angeles Marathon in 1991.

== Biography ==
While attending Dover High School in New Hampshire, Cathy qualified for the 1984 Olympic Trials Marathon in her first marathon, at 2:45.07. In the trials, held in Olympia, Washington, when she was only 16 years old, she ran 2:34:24. She finished in 9th place after being a legitimate contender for third place on the team, until fading in the last few miles. Her time there still stands as the national high school women's record in the marathon, and it was a junior record that lasted for 36 years. She competed in the United States Olympic Trials Marathon two more times in 1988 and 1992. In the Olympic Trials Marathon in 1988 (May 1) in Pittsburgh, she finished third in a time of 2:30:18, which qualified her for the US Olympic team. O'Brien then placed 40th in the women's marathon at 1988 Summer Olympics in Seoul, South Korea. In the Olympic Trials Marathon in 1992 (January 26), in Houston, she finished second in a time of 2:30:28, qualifying her for the 1992 Summer Olympics in Barcelona, Spain. O'Brien was 10th overall and the top-finishing American.

Some of her notable performances include:

- 1990 Goodwill Games
  Silver medal in the 10,000 meters, in a personal best time of 32:05
- 1989 Paris Marathon
  2nd in a time of 2:31:14
- 1989 Chicago Marathon
  3rd in a time of 2:31:19
- 1989 Crim 10 miler (Flint, Michigan)
  1st in a then-world record time of 51:47, which stood until 1991
- Girls Foot Locker Cross Country Championships:
  - 1984 – 1st in 16:48.1
  - 1983 – 3rd in 17:25.4
  - 1982 – 10th in 17:33.1
  - 1981 – 19th in 17:51

== Achievements ==
- All results regarding marathon, unless stated otherwise

Year	Competition	Venue	Position	Notes
Representing United States
1988	Olympic Games	Seoul, South Korea	40th	2:41:04
1991	Los Angeles Marathon	Los Angeles, United States	1st	2:29:38
1992	Olympic Games	Barcelona, Spain	10th	2:39:42
