= Gary Howell (Michigan politician) =

American politician

Member of the Michigan House of Representatives from the 82nd district
- In office March 15, 2016 – January 1, 2023
- Preceded by: Todd Courser
- Succeeded by: Kristian Grant

Personal details
- Party: Republican
- Spouse: Cheryl Howell
- Website: www.gophouse.org/representatives/thumb/howell

Gary Howell is a Republican politician who was a member of the Michigan House of Representatives representing Lapeer County from 2016 to 2023.

Prior to his election to the House, Howell was the chairman of the Lapeer County Road Commission and president of the Lapeer Intermediate School District board.

Howell won a special election to succeed Todd Courser who resigned from the House after a scandal.
