= Cindy Gamrat =

American politician (born 1973)

Member of the Michigan House of Representatives from the 80th district
- In office January 1, 2015 – September 11, 2015
- Preceded by: Robert Genetski
- Succeeded by: Mary Whiteford

Personal details
- Born: Cindy Bauer; June 15, 1973 (age 53) Warren, Michigan
- Party: Republican
- Spouse: Joe Gamrat (div. 2017)
- Children: 3
- Profession: Nurse

Cindy Gamrat (née Bauer; born June 15, 1973) is a former Republican member of the Michigan House of Representatives, representing the 80th district. She was first elected in 2014, after playing a leading role in organizing the Tea Party movement in Michigan. She engaged in an extramarital affair with fellow Representative Todd Courser, and was expelled from the House in September 2015 for using taxpayer resources in an attempt to cover up the affair.

== Political career ==
=== Tea Party organizing activity ===
Gamrat became a Tea Party organizer after moving to Michigan in 2010. Shortly after moving, she founded Plainwell Patriots Tea Party and in 2011 founded Michigan 4 Conservative Senate.

In 2011, Gamrat was leader of the Plainwell Patriots Tea Party which hosted a United States Senate candidate forum on November 22 of that year. The event featured Cornerstone Schools executive Clark Durant, former Kent County Judge Randy Hekman, libertarian activist Scotty Boman of Detroit, Gary Glenn of Midland, president of the American Family Association of Michigan, and Roscommon businessman Peter Konetchy.

Michigan 4 Conservative Senate, also founded by Gamrat, was patterned after successful efforts by Indiana tea party groups that rallied behind Richard Mourdock as the tea party challenger to Republican U.S. Sen. Richard Lugar. In Michigan, she organized more than 50 tea party groups, under the name Michigan 4 Conservative Senate (MI4CS), to try to avoid dispersing tea party clout in a field crowded with conservatives. In addition to coordinating forums by tea party groups around the state, MI4CS organized a candidate forum at Central Michigan University in Mount Pleasant Michigan on January 14, 2012. The forum preceded a convention of Michigan tea party groups that would decide which of the participating candidates they would support. Clark Durant, Randy Hekman, Scotty Boman, Chuck Marino and Gary Glenn participated, while Peter Konetchy, Rick Wilson, and former Congressman Pete Hoekstra chose not to.

=== Michigan House of Representatives ===
With incumbent Bob Genetski unable to run for reelection due to term limits, Gamrat ran for election to the Michigan House of Representatives for the 80th district in the 2014 elections on a platform focused on leadership and self-described "family values", while identifying as part of the Tea Party Movement. Gamrat defeated Geoff Parker of the Democratic Party and Arnis Davidsons of the Libertarian Party in the general election.

In April 2015, Gamrat was permanently removed from the Michigan House's Republican Party caucus for violating their confidentiality rules with a Facebook post. The Detroit News published audio recordings on August 7, 2015, in which fellow Michigan Representative Todd Courser asked staff to create a rumor that he had sex with a male prostitute in order to distract from the affair he was having with Gamrat. Kevin Cotter, the Speaker of the Michigan House, initiated an investigation into their use of public funds to cover up their affair. She was found guilty of inappropriate behavior and expelled from the Michigan House on September 11, becoming the fourth lawmaker to be expelled from the legislature in Michigan history. Courser resigned before the House could pass a resolution to expel him.

Gamrat filed paperwork with the Allegan County Clerk to become a candidate in the special election to fill her former seat. She received 9% of the vote in the primary election, finishing in third place.

Gamrat was charged with two felony counts of official misconduct for her role in the scandal on February 26, 2016, by Michigan Attorney General Bill Schuette, which comes with a maximum penalty of five years in prison. On June 14, 2016, Lansing District Judge Hugh Clarke Jr. ruled that there is not enough probable cause for Gamrat to face felony misconduct in office charges.

== Personal life ==
Gamrat is a nurse from Plainwell, Michigan. She and her ex-husband, Joe, have three children, Paige, Joseph, and Meghan, whom they have homeschooled. Joe was accused of sending Cindy and Courser mysterious text messages during their affair, but was later cleared of any wrongdoing with no charges filed. She filed for divorce on August 3, 2016.
