= Bobby Crim =

American politician (born 1931)

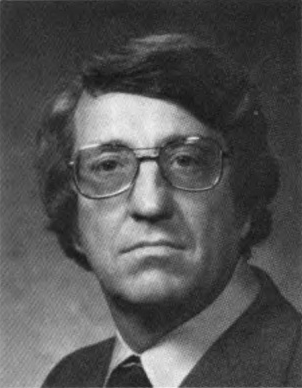

61st Speaker of the Michigan House of Representatives
- In office January 8, 1975 – December 31, 1982
- Governor: William G. Milliken
- Preceded by: William A. Ryan
- Succeeded by: Gary Owen

Member of the Michigan House of Representatives from the 82nd district
- In office January 1, 1973 – December 31, 1982
- Preceded by: F. Robert Edwards
- Succeeded by: Thomas E. Scott

Member of the Michigan House of Representatives from the 79th district
- In office January 1, 1965 – December 31, 1966
- Preceded by: District established
- Succeeded by: James F. Smith

Personal details
- Born: December 10, 1931 (age 94) Kennett, Missouri
- Party: Democratic
- Spouse: Marsha
- Children: Donald Wayne Crim, Douglas William Crim, David Warren Crim
- Education: University of Michigan–Flint

Bobby D. Crim (born December 10, 1931) is a former Democratic politician from Michigan who served in the Michigan House of Representatives, and who served as Speaker of the House from 1973 through 1982.

Crim is the founder of the Crim Festival of Races, an annual road race event in his hometown of Flint, Michigan. He is also a co-founder of a lobbying firm, Governmental Consultant Services, Inc., along with former Senate Majority Leader Robert VanderLaan. Crim is also a trustee emeritus of Michigan State University, having served on the board in 1983 and 1984.

== Life ==
In 1968, Bobby Crim served as a presidential elector.

Crim, then speaker of the state house, started the Crim in Flint as a 10-mile race in 1977.

In 2007, Crim appeared on Michigan Public Television's "Off the Record" program and expressed his opposition to term-limit provisions in Michigan's Constitution.

On August 21, 2014, a bronze statue of Crim was dedicated in downtown Flint near the starting line of the Crim Festival of Races.

== See also ==
- List of Michigan state legislatures
