= James F. Smith (Michigan politician) =

American politician (1923–2007)

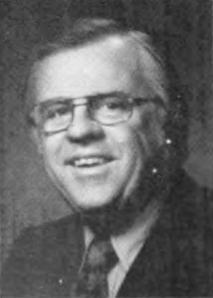

Member of the Michigan House of Representatives from the 83rd district
- In office January 1, 1973 – January 1, 1977
- Preceded by: Theodore P. Mansour
- Succeeded by: Charles L. Mueller

Member of the Michigan House of Representatives from the 79th district
- In office January 1, 1967 – January 1, 1973
- Preceded by: Bobby Crim
- Succeeded by: F. Robert Edwards

Personal details
- Born: August 15, 1923 Davison, Michigan, US
- Died: September 11, 2007 (aged 84) Davison, Michigan, US
- Party: Republican
- Spouse: Emma Jean Pearson
- Education: Michigan State University; Amherst College

Military service
- Allegiance: United States Army
- Years of service: 1943–1946
- Battles/wars: World War II

James F. Smith (August 15, 1923 – September 11, 2007) was a Michigan politician.

== Early life and education ==
Smith was born on August 15, 1923, in Davison, Michigan. Smith attended Michigan State University and Amherst College.

== Career ==
Smith served in the United States Army in World War II from 1943 to 1946.

Smith worked as a businessman before his political career. Smith served in local government of Davison, at different times serving there on the city council and later as mayor. Smith also served on the Genesee County Board of Supervisors. On November 8, 1966, Smith was elected to the Michigan House of Representatives where he represented the 79th district from January 1, 1967, to January 1, 1973. On November 7, 1972, Smith was elected to the Michigan House of Representatives where he represented the 83rd district from January 1, 1974, to January 1, 1977.

== Personal life ==
On September 14, 1946, Smith married Emma Jean Pearson. Together they had three children. Smith was a member of Veterans of Foreign Wars and the Elks. Smith was Baptist.

== Death ==
Smith died on September 11, 2007, in Davison. His residence at the time of his death was Charlevoix, Michigan. He was interred at Davison Cemetery.
