= Kristian Grant =

American politician

Member of the Michigan House of Representatives from the 82nd district
- Incumbent
- Assumed office January 1, 2023
- Preceded by: Gary Howell

Personal details
- Born: Grand Rapids, Michigan, U.S.
- Party: Democratic
- Education: Michigan State University (BA)

Kristian Grant is an American Democratic politician from Michigan. She was elected to the Michigan House of Representatives from the 82nd district in the 2022 election. She was reelected in 2024.

Grant is a real-estate developer and trustee on the Grand Rapids Public Schools Board of Education.
