= Todd Courser =

American politician (born 1972)

Member of the Michigan House of Representatives from the 82nd district
- In office January 1, 2015 – September 11, 2015
- Preceded by: Kevin Daley
- Succeeded by: Gary Howell

Personal details
- Born: Todd Anthony Courser; August 2, 1972 (age 54) Flint, Michigan, U.S.
- Party: Republican
- Spouse: Fon Courser
- Education: University of Michigan (BA); Cooley Law School (JD)
- Occupation: Lawyer

Todd Anthony Courser (born August 2, 1972) is an American lawyer, Tea Party Republican politician, and former member of the Michigan House of Representatives who resigned his seat when it became clear that he would be expelled for misconduct and the misuse of taxpayer resources in an attempt to cover up his extramarital affair with fellow Representative Cindy Gamrat.

== Education & legal career ==
He graduated from the University of Michigan with a Bachelor of Arts in 1995 and from Cooley Law School with a Juris Doctor in 2003.

Courser was admitted to the State Bar of Michigan in 2006 and continues to practice law in his firm, Todd A. Courser & Associates, PLLC.

== Electoral history ==
Courser ran unsuccessfully for a seat in the Michigan House of Representatives in 2008, for the Michigan Senate in 2010, and for the state Board of Education in 2012. In 2013, Courser unsuccessfully challenged incumbent Chairman of the Michigan Republican Party, Bobby Schostak.

In 2014, Courser again ran for a seat in the Michigan House of Representatives. A primary election was held on August 5, 2014, and a general election was held on November 4, 2014. The signature-filing deadline for candidates wishing to run in this election was April 22, 2014. Margaret Guerrero-DeLuca defeated Immanuel Eickholdt in the Democratic primary. Todd Courser defeated Jacob Hunsanger, Jan Peabody and Sharna Smith in the Republican primary. Courser defeated DeLuca in the general election.

82nd District (Lapeer)
Party	Candidate	Votes	%
Republican	Todd Courser	15,699	55.1
Democratic	Margaret Guerrero DeLuca	12,799	44.9
Total votes		28,498	100.0
Republican hold			

== Sex scandal ==
The Detroit News published audio recordings on August 7, 2015, in which Courser asked staff to create a rumor that he had sex with a male prostitute in order to distract from the affair he was having with Cindy Gamrat, also a member of the Michigan House of Representatives. Kevin Cotter, the Speaker of the Michigan House, initiated an investigation into their use of public funds to cover up their affair. Despite calls to resign from office, Courser claimed he was being blackmailed by mainstream Michigan Republicans and would not resign.

In the pre-dawn hours of September 11, 2015, Courser resigned after several hours of a stalemate on his expulsion vote. Gamrat was subsequently expelled from the House. Courser announced that he would run in the special election to fill his vacated seat. Courser finished in fifth place in the primary election, with less than 4% of the vote.

Courser was charged with four felonies over his role in the scandal on February 26, 2016, by Michigan Attorney General Bill Schuette. He was charged with three separate counts of official misconduct, which carries a maximum penalty of five years in prison and one count of perjury, which carries a maximum penalty of 15 years in prison. Courser is represented by Portage-based attorney Matthew S. DePerno.

In April 2016, Courser announced his candidacy for Lapeer County Prosecutor. He was unsuccessful in the August Republican primary, garnering about 4% of the vote.

Both Courser and Gamrat launched their own independent radio programs on WFDF-AM (910) in April, and then May respectively, of 2016.

In 2016, Lansing District Court Judge Hugh B. Clarke Jr. ordered Courser to stand trial on two felony counts (one count of perjury and one count of misconduct in office), while dismissing both felony counts against Gamrat.

In 2019, Courser pleaded no contest to willful neglect of duty by a public officer, a misdemeanor. He received probation.
