= Shane Hernandez =

American politician

Member of the Michigan House of Representatives from the 83rd district
- In office January 1, 2017 – December 31, 2020
- Preceded by: Paul Muxlow
- Succeeded by: Andrew Beeler

Personal details
- Born: Shane Lucas Hernandez; August 23, 1982 (age 44) Port Huron, Michigan, U.S.
- Party: Republican
- Education: Lawrence Technological University (BArch, MArch)

Shane L. Hernandez (born August 23, 1982) is an American politician and architect who served in the Michigan House of Representatives from the 83rd district from 2017 to 2020.

With Paul Mitchell opting not to run for reelection to the United States House of Representatives for Michigan's 10th congressional district in the 2020 elections, Hernandez ran to succeed him. He lost to Lisa McClain in the August 4 Republican Party primary election. On August 19, 2022, the Republican nominee for Michigan Governor Tudor Dixon selected Hernandez as her choice for running mate for the 2022 Michigan gubernatorial election.

Party political offices
Preceded by Lisa Posthumus Lyons	Republican nominee for Lieutenant Governor of Michigan; 2022	Succeeded by Jay DeBoyer
