= Theodore P. Mansour =

American politician

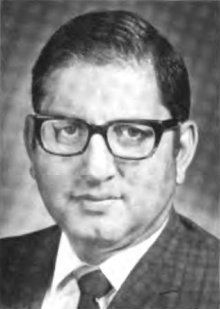

Member of the Michigan House of Representatives from the 83rd district
- In office January 1, 1971 – January 1, 1973
- Preceded by: James N. Callahan
- Succeeded by: James F. Smith

Personal details
- Born: December 12, 1925 Flint, Michigan, US
- Died: October 13, 2003 (aged 77)
- Party: Democratic
- Education: University of Notre Dame

Military service
- Years of service: 1944–1945
- Battles/wars: World War II

Theodore P. Mansour (December 12, 1925 – October 13, 2003) was a Michigan politician.

== Early life and education ==
Mansour was born in Flint, Michigan, on December 12, 1925. Mansour graduated from St. Mathews High School in Flint, and later earned a B.A. from the University of Notre Dame.

== Career ==
Mansour was a World War II veteran, serving in the war from 1944 to 1945. In 1968, Mansour served as supervisor of Flint Township, Michigan. At some point, Mansour served on the Genesee County Board of Commissioners and worked for the Genesee Intermediate School District. On November 3, 1970, Smith was elected to the Michigan House of Representatives where he represented the 83rd district from January 1, 1971, to January 1, 1973.

== Personal life ==
Mansour was Catholic.

== Death ==
Mansour died on October 13, 2003. His funeral services were held at Lady of Lebanon Catholic Church in Flint Township on October 17.
