= Paul Muxlow =

American politician (1938–2024)

Member of the Michigan House of Representatives from the 83rd district
- In office January 1, 2011 – December 31, 2016
- Preceded by: John Espinoza
- Succeeded by: Shane Hernandez

Personal details
- Born: June 15, 1938 Brown City, Michigan, U.S.
- Died: February 23, 2024 (aged 85)
- Party: Republican
- Spouse: Liz
- Children: Three
- Education: University of Michigan; Eastern Michigan University

Paul Muxlow (June 15, 1938 – February 23, 2024) was an American Republican politician from Michigan who served in the Michigan House of Representatives for three terms of office.

Muxlow was the owner of Muxlow and Associates Real Estate, and was a former student services coordinator at the local vocational/technical center. He was a former teacher and counselor at the Lapeer County Intermediate School District and formerly a Michigan Air National Guard member.

Muxlow died on February 23, 2024, at the age of 85.
