= Michigan's 83rd House of Representatives district =

American legislative district

Michigan's 83rd State House of Representatives district
Representative
John W. Fitzgerald; D–Wyoming
- Demographics: 50.5% White; 9.7% Black; 32.6% Hispanic; 1.6% Asian; 0.1% Native American; 0.5% Other; 5.1% Multiracial
- Population (2024): 94,532

Michigan's 83rd House of Representatives district (also referred to as Michigan's 83rd House district) is a legislative district within the Michigan House of Representatives located in part of Kent County. The district was created in 1965, when the Michigan House of Representatives district naming scheme changed from a county-based system to a numerical one.

== List of representatives ==
Representative	Party	Dates	Residence	Notes
Ray M. Flavin	Democratic	1965–1966	Swartz Creek	
James N. Callahan	Democratic	1967–1970	Mount Morris	
Theodore P. Mansour	Democratic	1971–1972	Flint	
James F. Smith	Republican	1973–1976	Grand Blanc	
Charles L. Mueller	Republican	1977–1986	Linden	
Kay M. Hart	Democratic	1987–1990	Swartz Creek	
David B. Robertson	Republican	1991–1992	Grand Blanc	
Kim A. Rhead	Republican	1993–1998	Sandusky	
Stephen R. Ehardt	Republican	1999–2004	Lexington	
John Espinoza	Democratic	2005–2010	Croswell	
Paul Muxlow	Republican	2011–2016	Brown City	
Shane Hernandez	Republican	2017–2020	Port Huron	
Andrew Beeler	Republican	2021–2022	Fort Gratiot	
John W. Fitzgerald	Democratic	2023–present	Wyoming	

== Recent elections ==
=== 2020s ===
2026 Michigan House of Representatives election
Party	Candidate	Votes	%
Democratic	John Fitzgerald (incumbent)	20,529	62.5
Republican	Cindy Ramirez	12,315	37.5
Total votes		32,844	100
Democratic hold			

2018 Michigan House of Representatives election
Party	Candidate	Votes	%
Republican	Shane Hernandez	20,185	64.28
Democratic	Stefanie Brown	11,218	35.72
Total votes		31,403	100
Republican hold			

2016 Michigan House of Representatives election
Party	Candidate	Votes	%
Republican	Shane Hernandez	23,108	62.79%
Democratic	Jim Frank	12,345	33.54%
Green	Deena Marie Bruderick	1,350	3.67%
Total votes		36,803	100.00%
Republican hold			

2014 Michigan House of Representatives election
Party	Candidate	Votes	%
Republican	Paul Muxlow	15,013	62.15
Democratic	Marcus Middleton	9,144	37.85
Total votes		24,157	100.0
Republican hold			

2012 Michigan House of Representatives election
Party	Candidate	Votes	%
Republican	Paul Muxlow	19,750	55.74
Democratic	Carol Campbell	15,685	44.26
Total votes		35,435	100.0
Republican hold			

2010 Michigan House of Representatives election
Party	Candidate	Votes	%
Republican	Paul Muxlow	14,940	59.63
Democratic	Alan Lewandowski	10,115	40.37
Total votes		25,055	100.0
Republican gain from Democratic			

2008 Michigan House of Representatives election
Party	Candidate	Votes	%
Democratic	John Espinoza	26,005	64.52
Republican	Steve Kearns	14,299	35.48
Total votes		40,304	100.0
Democratic hold			

== Historical district boundaries ==
Map	Description	Apportionment Plan	Notes
	Genesee County (part): Clayton Township; Flint (part); Flint Township; Flushing Township; Gaines Township; Montrose Township; Mount Morris; Mount Morris Township; Swartz Creek	1964 Apportionment Plan	
	Genesee County (part): Argentine Township; Atlas Township; Clayton Township; Fenton; Fenton Township; Flint Township (part); Gaines Township; Grand Blanc; Grand Blanc Township; Mundy Township; Swartz Creek	1972 Apportionment Plan	
	Genesee County (part): Argentine Township; Clayton Township (part); Fenton; Fenton Township; Flint Township (part); Gaines Township; Grand Blanc; Grand Blanc Township; Mundy Township; Swartz Creek	1982 Apportionment Plan	
	Lapeer County (part): Arcadia Township; Burlington Township; Burnside Township; Deerfield Township; Elba Township; Goodland Township; Hadley Township; Marathon Township; Mayfield Township; North Branch Township; Oregon Township; Rich Township; Sanilac County	1992 Apportionment Plan	
	Sanilac County St. Clair County (part): Burtchville Township; Fort Gratiot Township; Port Huron	2001 Apportionment Plan	
	Sanilac County St. Clair County (part): Burtchville Township; Fort Gratiot Township; Port Huron	2011 Apportionment Plan	
