= John Espinoza =

American politician (born 1950)

John Espinoza (born in Texas in 1950) is a Hispanic politician, soldier, educator, city manager of Croswell, Michigan and former law enforcement officer from the State of Michigan.

He grew up in a family of migrant workers from Texas, volunteered for service in the United States Army as a young man, and in 2004 was elected as a Democrat to the Michigan House of Representatives. He served in his second term serving the 83rd House District of Michigan. This district comprises all Sanilac County and a portion of St. Clair County including the City of Port Huron, Michigan. Espinoza is one of only three Hispanics in the Michigan legislature at that time.

== Early life ==
Espinoza spent his early years working in the cotton fields of Texas with his father Leto and brothers Erasmo and Pepe. His mother Leta and sister Estela took care of the homefront. Eventually the family moved to Sanilac County, Michigan when Espinoza was still young. In Michigan, they continued working in the farm fields as well as in area orchards; tending to such crops as sugar beets, cucumbers, and apples.

== Education ==
Espinoza attended Croswell-Lexington High School. He earned his associate degree from the Central Texas College and his Bachelor of Science Degree from the University of the State of New York.

== Military and Law Enforcement Service ==
He enlisted in the military in 1969 at the age of 18. Espinoza served with the United States Army in Vietnam, where he earned several awards and decorations. He left the army in 1971.

From 1971 to 1977 he worked as a law enforcement officer with the Croswell, Michigan Police Department and then the Sanilac County, Michigan Sheriff's Department.

In 1977 he re-enlisted in the Army and was stationed in such faraway locales as Germany and Alaska. Espinoza eventually became a Sergeant and also served in the First Gulf War. He retired from the military in 1995.

== Political career ==
Espinoza and his wife Mary (Torrez) settled in Croswell, Michigan in 1995. He became interested in local politics and successfully ran for a seat on the Croswell City Council. Subsequently, Espinoza was elected to the Sanilac County Board of Commissioners, where he served one term.

He also worked on the staff of Michigan State Senator Jim Barcia when Mr. Barcia was a United States Democratic Congressman from Michigan. Espinoza held the position of Military Affairs and Community Outreach Liaison for Congressman Barcia .

In 2004, running on a populist platform powered by tenacious grass roots campaigning, John Espinoza was elected to his first term as a member of the Michigan House representing the 83rd District, becoming the first ever Democrat and Hispanic to win the seat.

He was easily re-elected in 2006 and now serves as the chair of the Agricultural Appropriations Committee.

== As An Educator ==
Upon his return to Michigan in the late 1990s Espinoza also worked as a teacher in the Carsonville-Port Sanilac, Michigan School District. Later Espinoza returned to education after serving as a city manager and taught Spanish at the Croswell-Lexington high school.

He earned his teaching certification from Saginaw Valley State University in Saginaw, Michigan.

== Media Highlights ==
Espinoza was also the inaugural producer and host of the pioneering mid Michigan Public Broadcasting System television show Somos Hispanos; broadcast from the campus of Delta College in Bay City, Michigan. He interviewed many important Hispanic figures including Public Broadcasting System news anchor Ray Suarez and actor/ activist Edward James Olmos. Espinoza received many accolades for his excellent work. He left the show to run successfully for the Michigan State House.

Espinoza has shared his insights via regular programs on Sanilac, Michigan County radio station WMIC and written contributions to the Sanilac County News and the Port Huron Times-Herald.

== America's Son - the Odyssey of John Espinoza ==
In 2006, Ray W. Denison published a book about John Espinoza's life, America's Son - the Odyssey of John Espinoza. This biography details Espinoza's "journey from the Texas cotton fields to Vietnam and the Michigan legislature."

The Lakeshore Guardian publication of Michigan wrote a review of Mr. Denison's work and congratulated him on a 'well written' book.

== Personal ==
Espinoza lives in Croswell, and has been married to Mary since 1969. He has three children.
