= Crim Festival of Races =

Series of yearly races that takes place in Flint, Michigan

- Location: Flint, Michigan
- Event type: road
- Distance: several (10 Miles)
- Primary sponsor: Health Alliance Plan
- Beneficiary: Area 13 Special Olympics
- Established: 1977
- Course records: m: Joseph Kamau (KEN) 45:43 w: Vicoty Chepngeno (USA) 51:35

The Crim Festival of Races is an annual road running event with several races and walking events. The original distance was 10 miles (16 kilometers) and is the marque race as "The Crim" with its infamous Bradley Hills and blue line to keep runners on course. The Crim has been held in August in Flint, Michigan since 1977. It draws runners from around the world from countries such as Kenya, Russia, and Ukraine. The race attracts approximately 50,000 people each year. The festival is one of the Flint Parade of Festivals.

The races and walks are Michigan Mile Series, 5K, 5 Mile, 10 Mile, the Teddy Bear Trot and Lois Craig Invitational Special Olympics Race.

The race has hosted the United States national 10-mile championship race on two occasions. The 2009 women's U.S. title was won by Molly Huddle, while the 2010 men's title was won by Fasil Bizuneh.

== History ==
Bobby Crim, then speaker of the state house, and Lois Craig, Crim's administrative assistant, were looking for a fundraiser in 1976 for the Special Olympics program that was just starting up. The fourth Saturday in August 1977 was selected with a start time of Noon with Craig serving as race director. That first Bobby Crim Road Race had 707 runners and raised $30,170 for Special Olympics. While expecting to be a one time event, Crim wished to continue the event to raise more money.

In 1979, the race had 34,000 runners and spectators from all over the world. In 1985, race organization was incorporated as The Crim Road Race, Inc. to increase the number of charities assisted. Additional races were added in 1987, the 8K Race and in 1988, the 5K Family Walk and Teddy Bear Trot. From 1989 to 1992, the Crim 8K Walk, the Friday night concert the night before, carnival rides and post-event entertainment were added.

=== Crim Festival of Races ===
In 1992, the Road Race event was renamed along with its corporate organization to Crim Festival of Races. The Festival continued to expand adding a one-mile run, 8K race/walk, 5K run, Competitive Walk, Neighborhood Running Clubs, Crim Kids Classic, the Crim Training Program, Beyond 2000 community fitness Program and The Feelin’ Good Mileage Club school fitness program between 1992 and 2008. With the 1993 event raising $1.3 million, Craig stepped down as race director to go to work for Area 13 Special Olympics. A Special Olympics race that is held as a part of the Festival on Friday was named in Craig's honor, the Lois Craig Invitational Special Olympics Race.

In 2013, the Michigan Mile Series was moved from Saturday to Friday night before the rest of the races with a separate heat for professionals, the Professional Mile, with a purse of $10,000 and a new course going around the University of Michigan–Flint.

Due to Flint River remediation work in 2017, the 10 mile race route had well-received changes. For the 2018 festival, the 8K race/walk was replaced with a 5 mile race or true "half Crim". Routes of the 5 mile and the 5K races will overlap more with the 10 mile as to reduce traffic issues adding the Chevy Commons and Mott Park neighborhood, while the 10 mile route would retain the 2017 changes.

== Past winners ==
Key: Course record U.S. championship race

Edition	Year	Men's winner	Time (m:s)	Women's winner	Time (m:s)
1st	1977	Steve Kenyon (GBR)	50:05	Kim Merritt (USA)	58:41
2nd	1978	Greg Meyer (USA)	48:00	Celia Peterson (USA)	59:30
3rd	1979	Herb Lindsay (USA)	48:00	Joan Samuelson (USA)	55:42
4th	1980	Herb Lindsay (USA)	47:07	Patti Catalano (USA)	53:40
5th	1981	Herb Lindsay (USA)	47:15	Patti Catalano (USA)	55:35
6th	1982	Steve Kenyon (GBR)	46:43	Joan Samuelson (USA)	53:18
7th	1983	Nick Rose (GBR)	46:58	Lisa Ondieki (AUS)	55:07
8th	1984	Nick Rose (GBR)	46:59	Janice Ettle (USA)	55:16
9th	1985	Ken Martin (USA)	46:55	Lisa Ondieki (AUS)	53:48
10th	1986	Ed Eyestone (USA)	47:36	Lisa Rainsberger (USA)	54:47
11th	1987	Brian Sheriff (ZIM)	48:09	Lisa Rainsberger (USA)	55:02
12th	1988	Ed Eyestone (USA)	46:44 †	Lisa Rainsberger (USA)	53:10 †
13th	1989	Brian Sheriff (ZIM)	46:23	Cathy O'Brien (USA)	51:47
14th	1990	Ken Martin (USA)	47:44	Uta Pippig (GER)	53:56
15th	1991	Steve Kogo (KEN)	47:15	Lesley Lehane (USA)	54:02
16th	1992	Simon Karori (KEN)	46:21	Olga Markova (RUS)	53:17
17th	1993	Alejandro Cruz (MEX)	47:05	Lynn Jennings (USA)	52:53
18th	1994	Benson Masya (KEN)	46:22	Anne-Marie Lauck (USA)	53:42
19th	1995	Thomas Osano (KEN)	46:06	Delilah Asiago (KEN)	53:08
20th	1996	Joseph Kamau (KEN)	45:43	Catherine Ndereba (KEN)	52:50
21st	1997	Brahim Lahlafi (MAR)	45:45	Hellen Kimaiyo (KEN)	53:34
22nd	1998	John Korir Kipsang (KEN)	46:15	Catherine Ndereba (KEN)	53:33
23rd	1999	John Korir Kipsang (KEN)	46:54	Catherine Ndereba (KEN)	54:22
24th	2000	Mark Yatich (KEN)	47:36	Catherine Ndereba (KEN)	53:01
25th	2001	Laban Kipkemboi (KEN)	46:41	Catherine Ndereba (KEN)	52:36
26th	2002	Simon Rono (KEN)	47:13	Catherine Ndereba (KEN)	52:09
27th	2003	John Korir Kipsang (KEN)	46:22	Lyudmila Biktasheva (RUS)	51:52
28th	2004	Linus Maiyo (KEN)	48:06	Leah Malot (KEN)	54:35
29th	2005	Fabiano Joseph (TAN)	47:46	Alevtina Ivanova (RUS)	53:34
30th	2006	Samuel Kiplimo Kosgei (KEN)	46:49	Alevtina Ivanova (RUS)	53:06
31st	2007	Festus Kioko Langat (KEN)	47:11	Angelina Mutuku Mutheu (KEN)	54:53
32nd	2008	Stephen Koech (KEN)	48:04	Irene Limika (KEN)	55:49
33rd	2009	Enock Mitei (KEN)	46:50	Alemitu Abera Begna (ETH)	53:49
34th	2010	Julius Kiprotich Kogo (KEN)	47:06	Mare Dibaba (ETH)	53:52
35th	2011	Julius Kiprotich Kogo (KEN)	47:15	Everlyne Lagat (KEN)	55:15
36th	2012	Julius Kiprotich Kogo (KEN)	46:45	Caroline Rotich Cheptanui (KEN)	53:43
37th	2013	Julius Kiprotich Kogo (KEN)	45:55	Aliphine Tuliamuk Bolton (KEN)	54:28
38th	2014	Julius Kiprotich Kogo (KEN)	46:36	Aliphine Tuliamuk Bolton (KEN)	52:48
39th	2015	Leonard Essau Korir (KEN)	47:00	Caroline Rotich (KEN)	53:06
40th	2016	Dathan Ritzenhein (USA)	47:24	Joan Jepkorir Aiyabei (KEN)	55:37
41st	2017	Julius Kiprotich Kogo (KEN)	47:01	Buze Diriba (ETH)	51:49

- † = The 1988 course was 10 meters short of the official 10-mile race distance

Preceded by Back to the Bricks	Flint Parade of Festivals	Succeeded by Flint Festival of Quilts

Preceded by In Your Face Steeplechase (June)	Crim Races	Succeeded by Run Your Ice Off (February)

== Crim Fitness Foundation ==
Crim Fitness Foundation, Inc.
- Founder: Bobby Crim; Lois Craig
- Type: Nonprofit corporation
- Region served: Genesee County, Michigan
- Website: crim.org
- Formerly called: The Crim Road Races, Inc. Crim Festival of Races, Inc.

The Crim Fitness Foundation, Inc. (CFF), formerly The Crim Road Races, Inc. and Crim Festival of Races, Inc., is a 501(c)(3) non-profit promoting fitness in Genesee County, Michigan, and is the operator of the Crim Festival of Races. The Foundation grew out of the race organizing group of the Crim 10 mile race.

=== History ===
Bobby Crim, then speaker of the state house, and Lois Craig, Crim's assistant, started the Crim as a 10-mile race in 1977. The early years' planning committee of 14 volunteers was known as the Kitchen Cabinet by Craig. In 1985, race organization was incorporated as The Crim Road Race, Inc. to increase the number of charities assisted. Big Brother/Big Sisters of Greater Flint, Fair Winds Girl Scouts, Shelter of Flint, Genesee County Literacy Coalition and the Crim Youth Development Program were some of the charities assisted.

In 1992, the multi-race Crim Road Race event is renamed along with its corporate organization to Crim Festival of Races. In 1994, the first annual Crim Kids Classic was run. In 1997, Marti Austin was hired as youth development coordinator to run the Kids Classic. In the early 2000s, the Crim Training Program designed the Hurley Foundation's Tuuri races as an official training races.

==== Fitness Foundation ====
In October 2005, the Crim Festival of Races, Inc. changed its name to the Crim Fitness Foundation, Inc.

On April 16, 2008, the Crim Foundation signed a purchase agreement for the Character Inn, a 16-story former Hyatt Regency hotel. With the owners not signing off on the purchase, the Foundation transferred the option to buy to the CS Mott Foundation.

Oakland County Executive L. Brooks Patterson proposed a half marathon modeled after the Crim Festival in his 2007 State of the County address. After losing his son, Brooks Stuart Patterson, the half marathon was named Brooksie Way Half Marathon with the Crim Foundation coming on board to help run the road race with the first held October 5, 2008. In 2009, two new 5K races were run in Flint, Start Heart in May and Auburn Hills, Michigan, Glenda's Glide in June. After the 2011 Brooksie Way, the Foundation ended its contract to run the event.

In 2010, the Hurley Foundation ran its last Tuuri road race with some interest in the Foundation in taking over the race, but was replaced without CFF taking over in 2011 by the Atwood Stadium Road Race on the calendar and as a vouchered race for the Crim Training Program.

On May 20, 2012, the Crim races expanded with "The Qualifier" event in Midland and Bay City added to the Dow Run/Walk to become the Dow Weekend of Races, however the Foundation was not involved in 2013 when the race became the Great Lakes Bay Marathons. On July 22, the Foundation ran the third annual Le Champion Pave bike race downtown taking over from the bike race organizer of Le Champion Pave and the Maillot Jaune Bicycle Road Race.

On May 11, 2013, the CFF held the first annual Health Plus Tour de Crim bicycle/obstacle challenge to give non-runners a taste of what the 10 mile Crim course is like. With the June 2013, the Crim Kids Classic was renamed the Marti Austin Kids Classic.

The Foundation wanted a race during the winter months to promote year-round fitness, so they started the Run Your Ice Off 5K race as the first race of the Grass Roots Race Series to take place during the Fire and Ice Festival in Downtown Flint starting with the second festival on February 22, 2014. Additional Grass Roots Races Series events were to be scheduled in June, July and September, each with different themes and to lead up to the Crim Festival. The festival itself will be adding the Crim Half, running the 10 mile and 5K to make a half marathon. Its Grass Roots Series by January 2014 pick up the Huckleberry Hustle, a July race, from the Genesee County Parks and Recreation Commission. The In Your Face Steeplechase had its inaugural run with 100 "people turned out" on June 26 for this race with obstacles run in conjunction with and AS a fundraiser for Mott Community College cross country team.

A Bobby Crim statue was created and installed the weekend before the 2014 Festival of Races north of the finish line on Saginaw Street.

In 2018, the foundation began managing CANUSA Games' finances. The Ally Challenge and CANUSA Games organizations and the foundation agreed to start holding a 5K race, CANUSA 5K Challenge.

=== Crim race series ===
- Marti Austin Kids Classic (May/June; formerly Crim Kids Classic) races: Diaper Dash, Toddler Trot, the Quarter Mile, Half Mile, and One Mile and is nicknamed "mini-Crim"
- Tour de Crim (May) - bike ride/obstacle challenge along the 10 mile Crim race path
- Grass Roots Race Series, Crim's low cost "fun" series:
  - Run Your Ice Off fun run/walk. First held on February 22, 2014 in conjunction with the Fire and Ice Festival and took place on the Flint River Trail but started and ended on the UM-Flint campus. Participation was limited to 350 for the first year
  - In Your Face Steeplechase (June 26, 2014) 3 mile run on a 1-mile loop at Pierce Park with obstacles like steep hills, hay bales and mud spots with viewer participation welcome and a fundraiser for Mott Community College's cross country team
  - Huckleberry Hustle & Little Berry Dash, (July 10, 2014) This 5K trail run/walk was pick up in its 11th year from Genesee County Parks and occurs at Crossroads Village.
- Crim Festival of Races (August) 5K, Half Crim, "The Crim" 10 Mile, the Crim Half (half marathon run using the 10 mile and 5K races) and the Teddy Bear Trot
  - Lois Craig Invitational Special Olympics Race (Friday)
  - Michigan Mile Race Series (Friday) original Saturday at its inaugural running
- CANUSA 5K Challenge (September) The Ally Challenge, CANUSA Games organization and the foundation agreed to start holding a 5K race, CANUSA 5K Challenge, in conjunction with the golf tournament in September 2019 at Warwick Hills to benefit the CANUSA Games.

==== Former race events ====
- The Brooksie Way Half Marathon & 5K (2008- 2011)
- Genesee County Start Heart Walk and Crim 5k, 5K (5/30/2009, 5/22/2010) Flint
- Glenda's Glide, 5K run/walk (06/27/2009, 06/26/2010) Auburn Hills, Michigan
- The Qualifier (2012) This event has two races, A half and full marathon, both of which will start at Dow Diamond in Midland, and end in downtown Bay City at the intersection of Midland and Dean. The Qualifiers are both part of a larger event called the Dow Weekend of Races with their addition to the Dow Run/Walk races in their 27th year. The race is called the Qualifier as it is line up to serve as a qualifying race for the major marathon races, Boston, New York and Chicago. Currently called the Great Lakes Bay Marathons not affiliated with the foundation.
- Le Champion Pave Criterium (2010-2012) 3rd annual bicycle races of varying distances held on July 22, 2012. The event was named after Albert Champion, a road bicycle racer and founder of AC Spark Plug.
