= 1934 in Michigan =

- Decades: 1910s; 1920s; 1930s; 1940s; 1950s
- See also: History of Michigan; Historical outline of Michigan; List of years in Michigan; 1934 in the United States

The following events occurred in Michigan in the year 1934.

== Office holders ==
=== State office holders ===
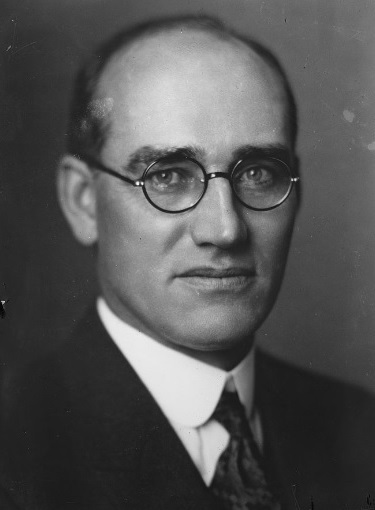
William Comstock

- Governor of Michigan: William Comstock (Democrat)
- Lieutenant Governor of Michigan: Allen E. Stebbins (Democrat)
- Michigan Attorney General: Patrick H. O'Brien
- Michigan Secretary of State: Frank D. Fitzgerald/Clarke W. Brown
- Speaker of the Michigan House of Representatives: Martin R. Bradley
- Chief Justice, Michigan Supreme Court: Nelson Sharpe

=== Mayors of major cities ===
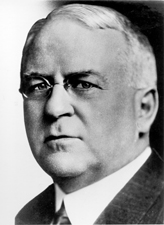
James Couzens

- Mayor of Detroit: Frank Couzens (Republican)
- Mayor of Grand Rapids: John D. Karel/William Timmers
- Mayor of Flint: Ray A. Brownell/Howard J. Clifford
- Mayor of Saginaw: Ben N. Mercer
- Mayor of Lansing: Max A. Templeton
- Mayor of Ann Arbor: Robert A. Campbell

=== Federal office holders ===
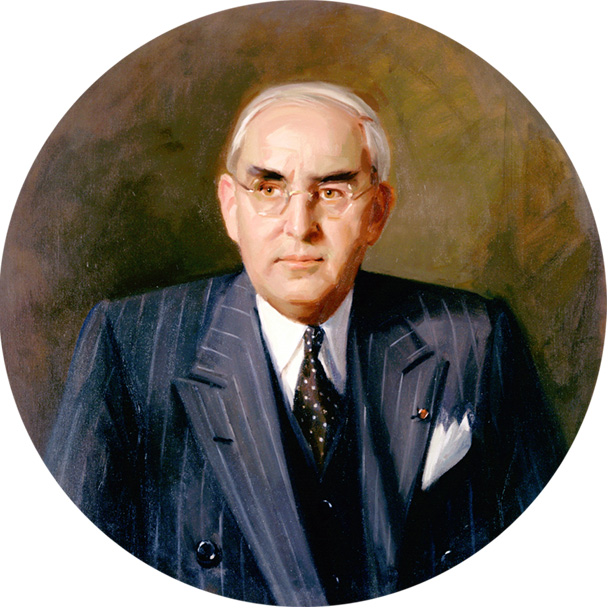
Arthur Vandenberg

- U.S. Senator from Michigan: James J. Couzens (Republican)
- U.S. Senator from Michigan: Arthur Vandenberg (Republican)
- House District 1: George G. Sadowski (Democrat)
- House District 2: John C. Lehr (Democrat)
- House District 3: Joseph L. Hooper (Republican)
- House District 4: George Ernest Foulkes (Democrat)
- House District 5: Carl E. Mapes (Republican)
- House District 6: Claude E. Cady (Democrat)
- House District 7: Jesse P. Wolcott (Republican)
- House District 8: Michael J. Hart (Democrat)
- House District 9: Harry W. Musselwhite (Democrat)
- House District 10: Roy O. Woodruff (Republican)
- House District 11: Prentiss M. Brown (Democrat)
- House District 12: W. Frank James (Republican)
- House District 13: Clarence J. McLeod (Republican)
- House District 14: Carl M. Weideman (Democrat)
- House District 15: John D. Dingell Sr. (Democrat)
- House District 16: John Lesinski Sr. (Democrat)
- House District 17: George Anthony Dondero (Republican)

== Population ==
In the 1930 United States census, Michigan was recorded as having a population of 4,842,325, ranking as the seventh most populous state in the country. By 1940, Michigan's population had increased by 8.5% to 5,256,106.

=== Cities ===
The following is a list of cities in Michigan with a population of at least 20,000 based on 1930 U.S. Census data. Historic census data from 1920 and 1940 is included to reflect trends in population increases or decreases. Cities that are part of the Detroit metropolitan area are shaded in tan.

| 1930 Rank | City | County | 1920 Pop. | 1930 Pop. | 1940 Pop. | Change 1930-40 |
|---|---|---|---|---|---|---|
| 1 | Detroit | Wayne | 993,678 | 1,568,662 | 1,623,452 | 3.5% |
| 2 | Grand Rapids | Kent | 137,634 | 168,592 | 164,292 | −2.6% |
| 3 | Flint | Genesee | 91,599 | 156,492 | 151,543 | −3.2% |
| 4 | Saginaw | Saginaw | 61,903 | 80,715 | 82,794 | 2.6% |
| 5 | Lansing | Ingham | 57,327 | 78,397 | 78,753 | 0.5% |
| 6 | Pontiac | Oakland | 34,273 | 64,928 | 66,626 | 2.6% |
| 7 | Hamtramck | Wayne | 48,615 | 56,268 | 49,839 | −11.4% |
| 8 | Jackson | Jackson | 48,374 | 55,187 | 49,656 | −10.0% |
| 9 | Kalamazoo | Kalamazoo | 48,487 | 54,786 | 54,097 | −1.3% |
| 10 | Highland Park | Wayne | 46,499 | 52,959 | 50,810 | −4.1% |
| 11 | Dearborn | Wayne | 2,470 | 50,358 | 63,589 | 26.3% |
| 12 | Bay City | Bay | 47,554 | 47,355 | 47,956 | 1.3% |
| 13 | Battle Creek | Calhoun | 36,164 | 45,573 | 43,453 | −4.7% |
| 14 | Muskegon | Muskegon | 36,570 | 41,390 | 47,697 | 15.2% |
| 15 | Port Huron | St. Clair | 25,944 | 31,361 | 32,759 | 4.5% |
| 16 | Wyandotte | Wayne | 13,851 | 28,368 | 30,618 | 7.9% |
| 17 | Ann Arbor | Washtenaw | 19,516 | 26,944 | 29,815 | 10.7% |
| 18 | Royal Oak | Oakland | 6,007 | 22,904 | 25,087 | 9.5% |
| 19 | Ferndale | Oakland | 2,640 | 20,855 | 22,523 | 8.0% |

=== Counties ===
The following is a list of counties in Michigan with populations of at least 50,000 based on 1930 U.S. Census data. Historic census data from 1920 and 1940 are included to reflect trends in population increases or decreases.

| 1930 Rank | County | Largest city | 1920 Pop. | 1930 Pop. | 1940 Pop. | Change 1930-40 |
|---|---|---|---|---|---|---|
| 1 | Wayne | Detroit | 1,177,645 | 1,888,946 | 2,015,623 | 6.7% |
| 2 | Kent | Grand Rapids | 183,041 | 240,511 | 246,338 | 2.4% |
| 3 | Genesee | Flint | 125,668 | 211,641 | 227,944 | 7.7% |
| 4 | Oakland | Pontiac | 90,050 | 211,251 | 254,068 | 20.3% |
| 5 | Saginaw | Saginaw | 100,286 | 120,717 | 130,468 | 8.1% |
| 6 | Ingham | Lansing | 81,554 | 116,587 | 130,616 | 12.0% |
| 7 | Jackson | Jackson | 72,539 | 92,304 | 93,108 | 0.9% |
| 8 | Kalamazoo | Kalamazoo | 71,225 | 91,368 | 100,085 | 9.5% |
| 9 | Calhoun | Battle Creek | 72,918 | 87,043 | 94,206 | 8.2% |
| 10 | Muskegon | Muskegon | 62,362 | 84,630 | 94,501 | 11.7% |
| 11 | Berrien | Benton Harbor | 62,653 | 81,066 | 89,117 | 9.9% |
| 12 | Macomb | Warren | 38,103 | 77,146 | 107,638 | 39.5% |
| 13 | Bay | Bay City | 69,548 | 69,474 | 74,981 | 7.9% |
| 14 | St. Clair | Port Huron | 58,009 | 67,563 | 76,222 | 12.8% |
| 15 | Washtenaw | Ann Arbor | 49,520 | 65,530 | 80,810 | 23.3% |
| 16 | Ottawa | Holland | 47,660 | 54,858 | 59,660 | 8.8% |
| 17 | Houghton | Houghton | 71,930 | 52,851 | 47,631 | −9.9% |
| 18 | Monroe | Monroe | 37,115 | 52,485 | 58,620 | 11.7% |
| 19 | Lenawee | Adrian | 47,767 | 49,849 | 53,110 | 6.5% |

== Sports ==
=== Baseball ===
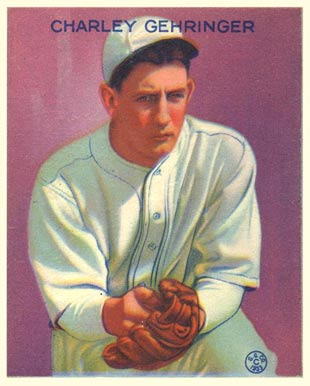
Charlie Gehringer

- 1934 Detroit Tigers season – Under player-manager Mickey Cochrane, the Tigers compiled a 101-53 record, finished in first place in the American League, and lost to the St. Louis Cardinals in the 1934 World Series. The team's statistical leaders included Charlie Gehringer with a .356 batting average, Hank Greenberg with 26 home runs and 139 RBIs, Schoolboy Rowe with 24 wins, and Elden Auker with a 3.42 earned run average.
- 1934 Michigan Wolverines baseball season - Under head coach Ray Fisher, the Wolverines compiled a 15–9 record. Avon Artz was the team captain.

=== American football ===
- 1934 Detroit Lions season – Under head coach Potsy Clark, the Lions compiled a 10–3 record and placed second in the NFL's Western Division. The team's statistical leaders included Dutch Clark with 383 passing yards, 763 rushing yards, and 73 points scored, and Harry Ebding with 264 receiving yards.
- 1934 Michigan State Spartans football team – Under head coach Charlie Bachman, the Spartans compiled an 8–1 record.
- 1934 Michigan Wolverines football team – Under head coach Harry Kipke, the Wolverines compiled a 1–7 record.
- 1934 Detroit Titans football team – The Titans compiled a 5–3–1 record under head coach Gus Dorais.
- 1934 Central State Bearcats football team - Under head coach Alex Yunevich the Bercats compiled a 5–3 record.
- 1934 Western State Hilltoppers football team - Under head coach Mike Gary, the Hilltoppers compiled a 7–1 record.
- 1934 Michigan State Normal Hurons football team - Under head coach Elton Rynearson, the Hurons compiled a 5–2 record.
- 1934 Wayne Tartars football team – The Tartars compiled a 7–1 record under head coach Joe Gembis.

=== Basketball ===
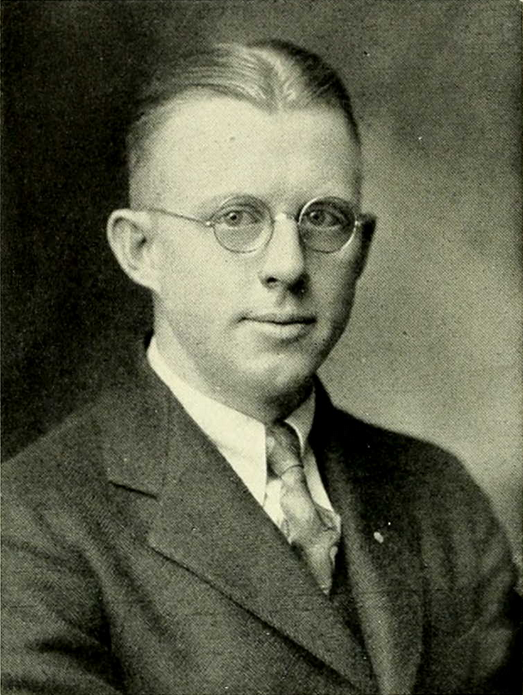
Benjamin Van Alstyne

- 1933–34 Michigan State Spartans men's basketball team – Under head coach Benjamin Van Alstyne, the Spartans compiled a 12–5 record.
- 1933–34 Western Michigan Broncos men's basketball team – Under head coach Buck Read, the Broncos compiled a 12–5 record.
- 1933–34 Michigan Wolverines men's basketball team – Under head coach Franklin Cappon, the Wolverines compiled a 6–14 record.
- 1933–34 Detroit Titans men's basketball team – Under head coach Lloyd Brazil, the Titans compiled a 7–8 record.
- 1933–34 Wayne Tartars men's basketball team – Under coach Newman Ertell, Wayne compiled a 9–8 record.

=== Ice hockey ===
- 1933–34 Detroit Red Wings season – Under coach Jack Adams, the Red Wings compiled a 24–14–4 record, finished in first place in the National Hockey League (NHL), and lost the Chicago Black Hawks in the 1934 Stanley Cup Finals. The team's statistical leaders included John Sorrell with 21 goals, Larry Aurie and Cooney Weiland with 19 assists each, and Aurie with 35 points. Wilf Cude and John Ross Roach were the team's goaltenders.
- 1933–34 Michigan Wolverines men's ice hockey team – Under head coach Ed Lowrey, the Wolverines compiled a 10–6 record.
- 1933–34 Michigan Tech Huskies men's ice hockey team – Under head coach Bert Noblet, the Huskies compiled a 12–9–1 record.

=== Other ===
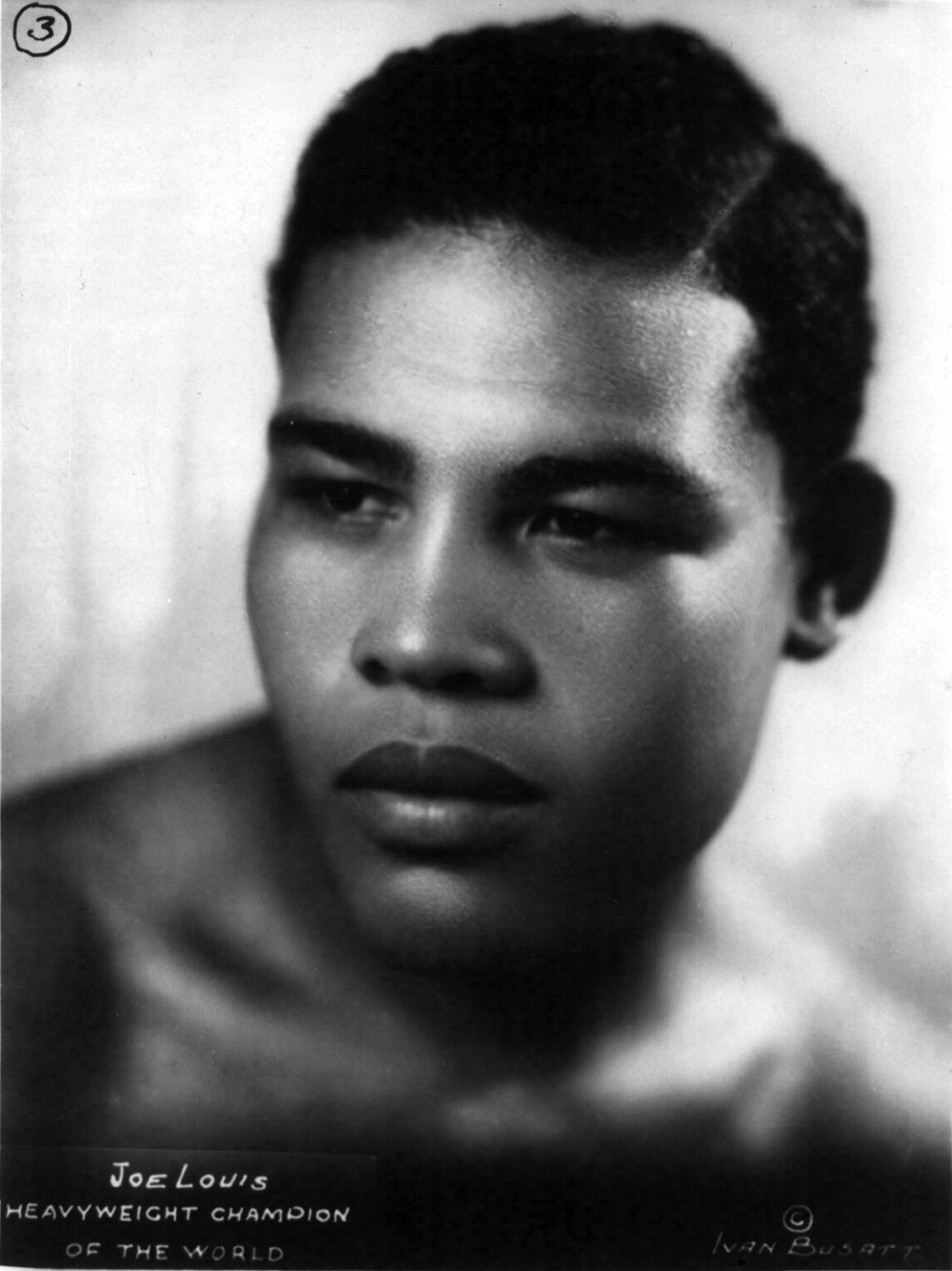
Joe Louis

- Joe Louis - Detroit's Joe Louis made his professional boxing debut on July 7 with a knockout against Jack Kracken. He had 12 professional bouts in the last six months of the year, all victories and 10 by knockout or technical knockout.
- Port Huron to Mackinac Boat Race –
- Michigan Open - Jake Fassezke won the tournament on July 10 at the Saginaw Country Club.

== Chronology of events ==
=== April ===
- April 10 - The Chicago Black Hawks defeated the Detroit Red Wings, 1-0, in double overtime of Game 4 of the 1934 Stanley Cup Finals, securing the Cup by three games to one. Mush March scored the game-winning goal while Detroit's Ebbie Goodfellow was in the penalty box.

=== October ===
- October 9 - The St. Louis Cardinals defeated the Detroit Tigers, 10-0, in Game 7 of the 1934 World Series. Dizzy Dean shut out the Tigers, but the game is most remembered for a near riot by Detroit fans. In the sixth inning, Joe Medwick slid hard into Marv Owen, the Tigers' third baseman, after hitting a triple. They tangled briefly, and when Medwick returned to his position in left field, the Detroit fans threw fruit, vegetables, bottles, cushions, etc., at Medwick. Commissioner Landis ordered Medwick benched to end the protest.

=== November ===
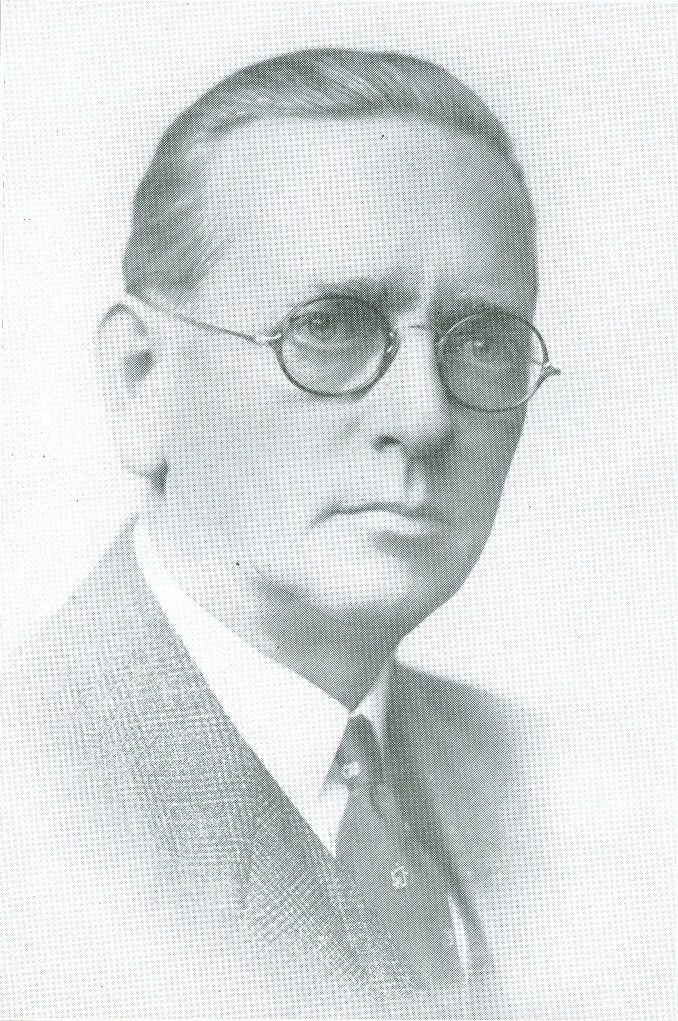
Frank Fitzgerald

- November 6

- Republican Frank Fitzgerald defeated Democrat Arthur J. Lacy in the gubernatorial election by a margin of 634,390 to 560,657.
- Republican U.S. Senator Arthur Vandenberg was reelected, defeating Democrat Frank Albert Picard by a margin of 597,960 to 552,783.
- The U.S. House of Representatives elections resulted in a gain of four seats for the Republican Party in the Michigan delegation. Incumbents were reelected in 9 of Michigan's 17 districts. Republican challengers defeated Democratic incumbents in five districts: Earl C. Michener defeated John C. Lehr in District 2; Clare E. Hoffman defeated George Ernest Foulkes in District 4; William W. Blackney defeated Claude E. Cady in District 6; Fred L. Crawford defeated Michael J. Hart in District 8; and Albert J. Engel defeated Harry W. Musselwhite in District 9. One Democratic challenger defeated a Republican incumbent: Frank Eugene Hook over W. Frank James in District 12. In District 3, Republican Henry M. Kimball was elected, replacing Joseph L. Hooper who died in office. In District 14, Louis C. Rabaut defeated incumbent Carl M. Weideman for the Democratic nomination and then won the general election.

=== December ===
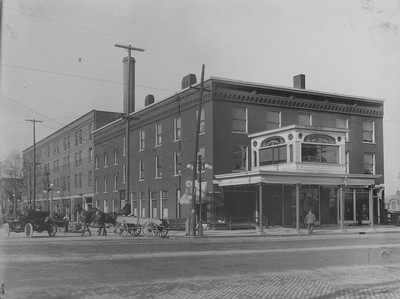
Kerns Hotel

- December 11 - The Kerns Hotel fire in Lansing, Michigan, killed 34 persons, including seven members of the Michigan Legislature.

== Births ==
- May 17 - Earl Morrall, NFL quarterback (1956–1976), in Muskegon, Michigan
- June 9 - Jackie Wilson, soul singer-songwriter ("Lonely Teardrops", "(Your Love Keeps Lifting Me) Higher and Higher") inducted into the Rock and Roll Hall of Fame, in Detroit
- June 28 - Carl Levin, U.S. Senator (1979-2015), in Detroit
- July 16 - George Perles, head football coach at Michigan State (1983-1994), in Detroit
- November 5 - Nick Smith, U.S. Congressman (1983-2005), in Addison, Michigan
- December 30 - Del Shannon, singer-songwriter ("Runaway"), in Grand Rapids, Michigan

=== Gallery of 1934 births ===
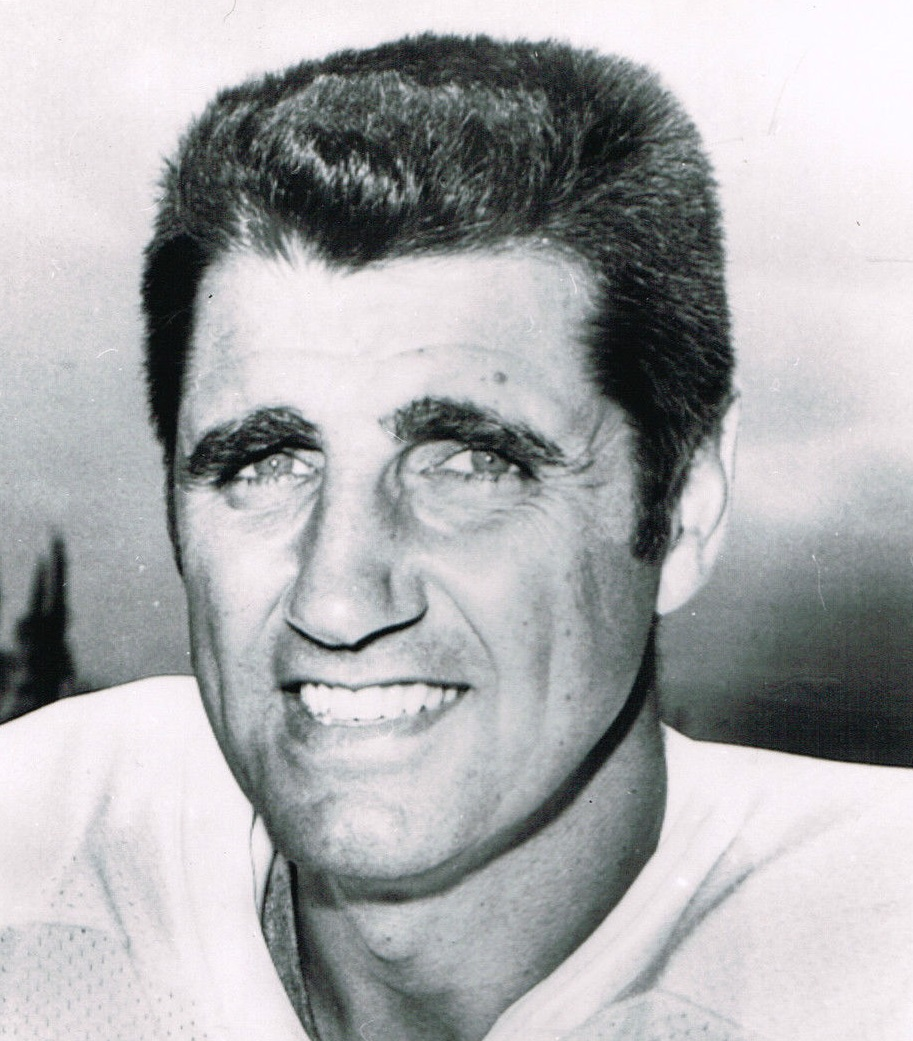
Earl Morrall

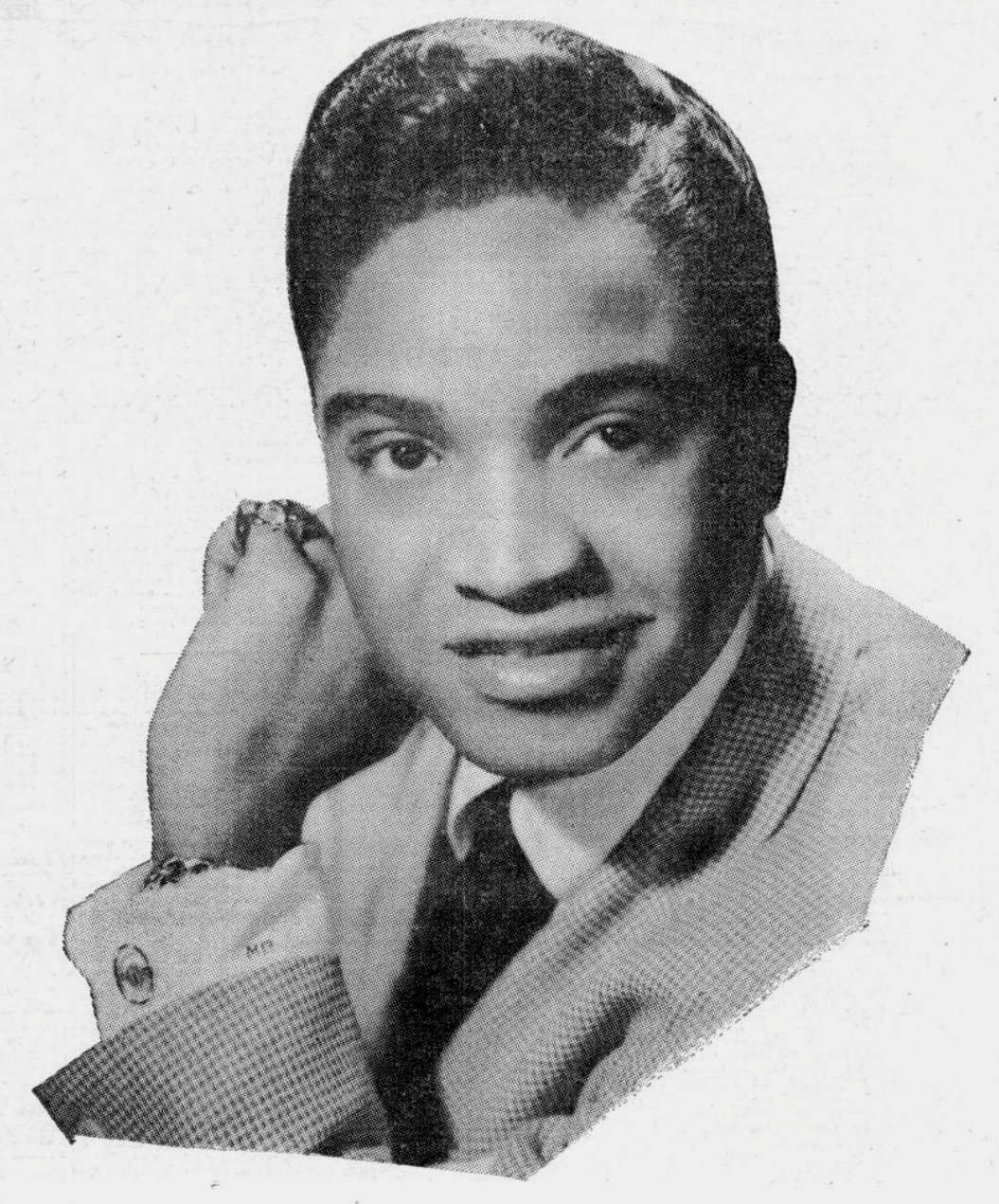
Jackie Wilson

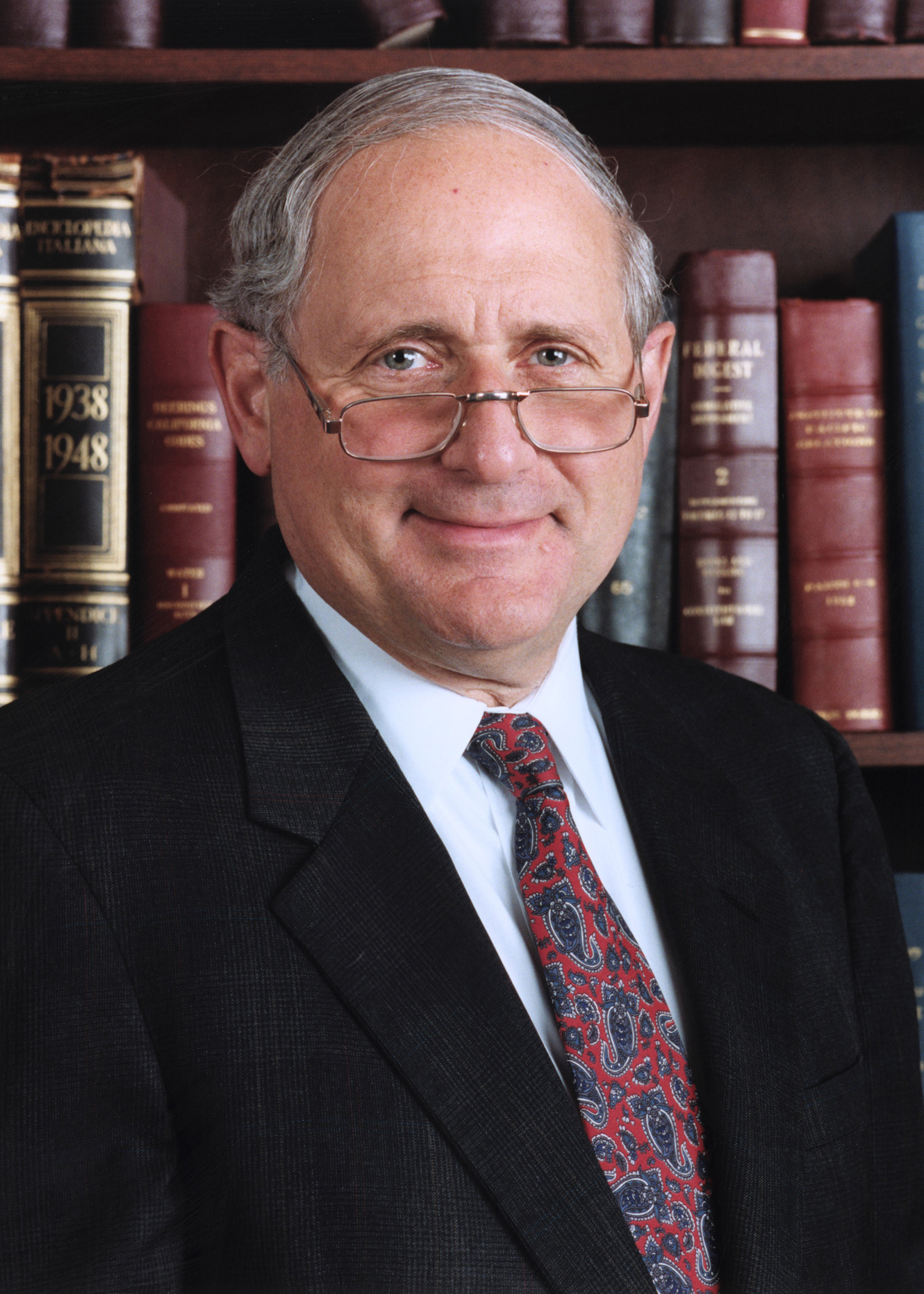
Carl Levin

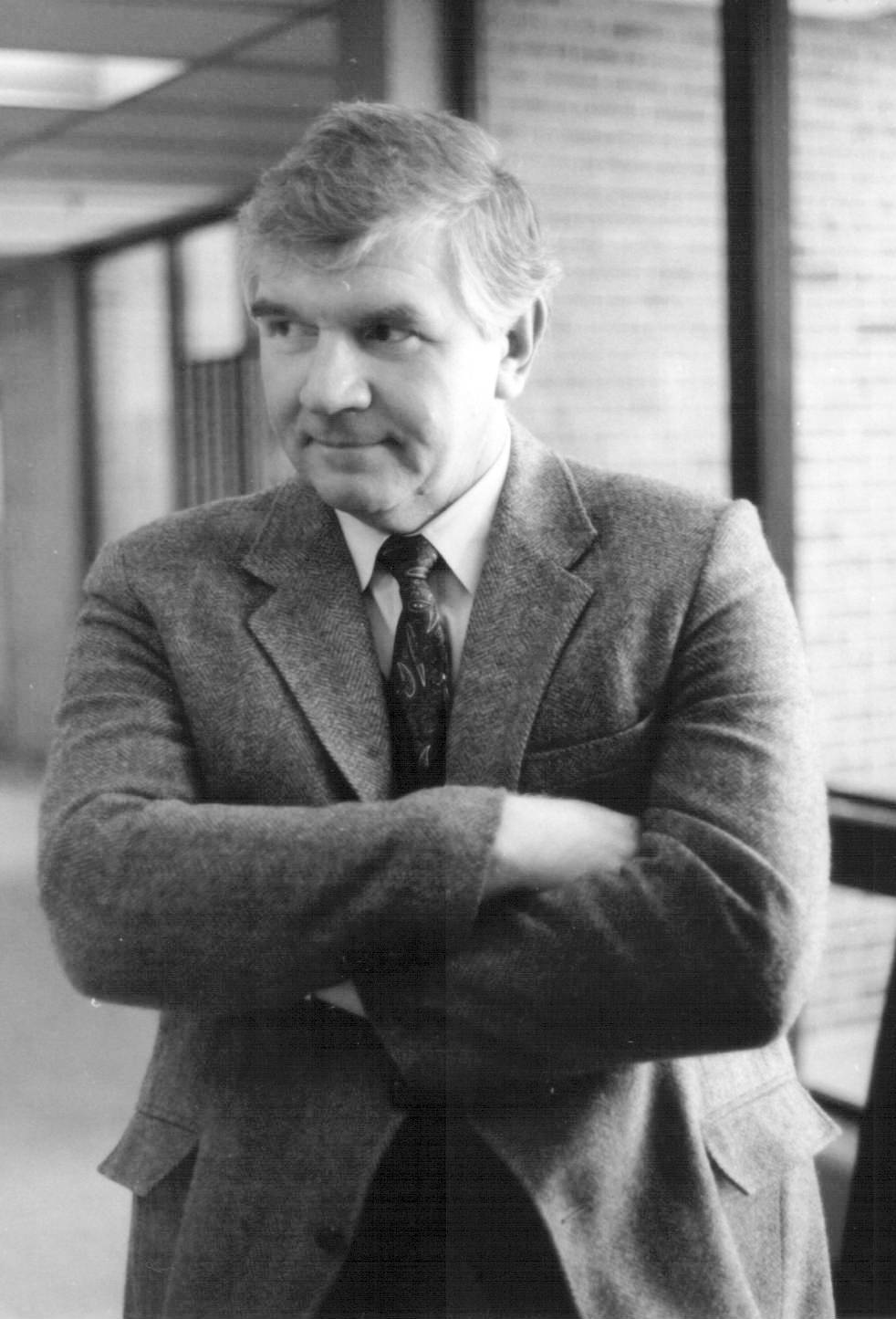
George Perles

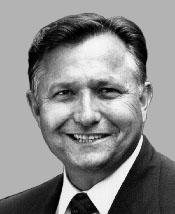
Nick Smith

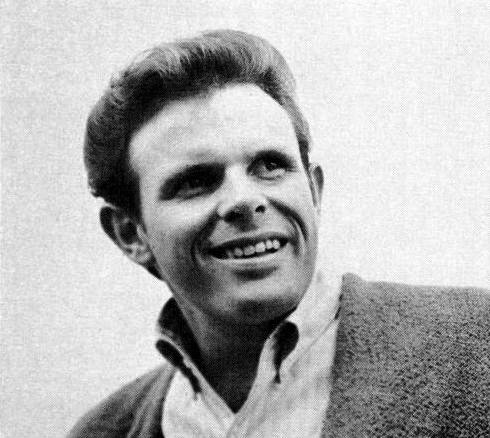
Del Shannon

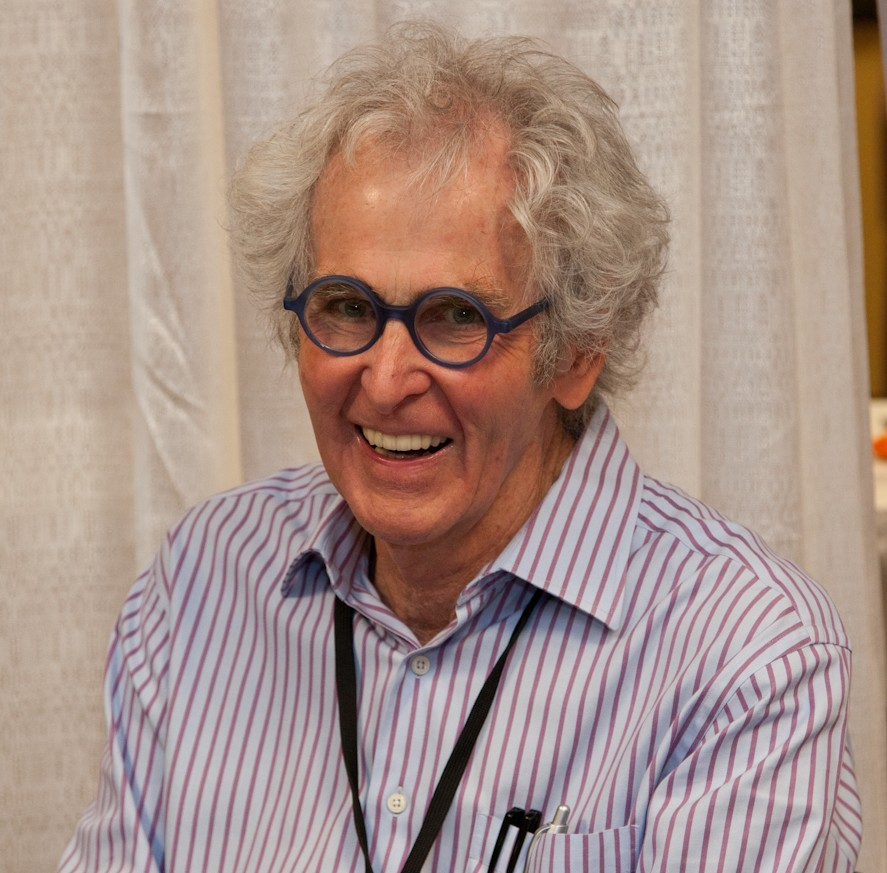
Jerry Uelsmann

== Deaths ==
- February 22 - Joseph L. Hooper, Congressman (1925-1934), at age 56 in Washington, D.C.
- April 4 - Dick Johnston, Major League Baseball player (1884-1891), at age 70 in Detroit
- May 10 - Ed Willett, pitcher for the Detroit Tigers (1906–1913), at age 50 in Wellington, Kansas
- May 13 - Albert Sleeper, Governor of Michigan (1917-1921), at age 71 in Lexington, Michigan
- July 15 - Bert Karnatz, dirt track auto racer and employee of Chrysler Corporation, at age 29 after a crash at the Veterans of Foreign Wars Speedway in Detroit
- August 21 - Carl Lundgren, Major League Baseball pitcher (1902-1909) and University of Michigan baseball coach (1914-1921), at age 54 in Marengo, Illinois
- October 23 - Gerrit Beneker, painter and illustrator best known for his paintings of industrial scenes and for his poster work in World War I, at age 52 in Truro, Massachusetts
- November 6 - William L. Clements, collector of historical works, founder, and donor to the William L. Clements Library at the University of Michigan, at age 74 in Bay City, Michigan
- November 7 - Warren A. Cartier, businessman who helped develop Ludington, Michigan, at age 68 in Chicago
- December 11 - Don E. Sias, Vern Voorhees, D. Knox Hanna, John Leidlein, John W. Goodwine, Charles Parker, and T. Henry Howlett, members of the Michigan Legislature, in the Kerns Hotel fire in Lansing, Michigan
- December 29 - Tenny Blount, the Detroit Stars of the Negro National League, at age 63 in Detroit

=== Gallery of 1934 deaths ===
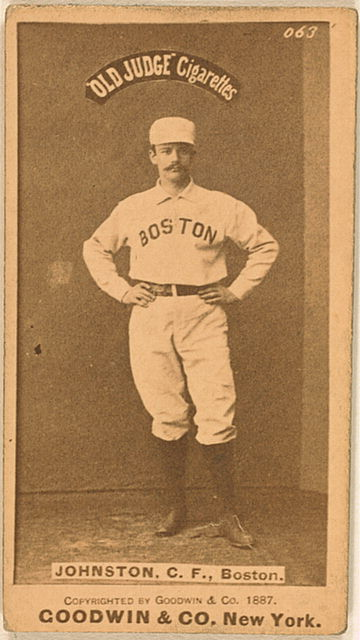
Dick Johnston

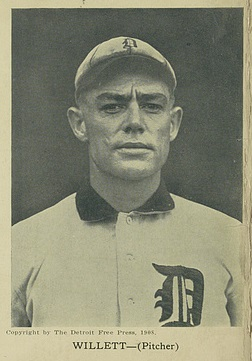
Ed Willett

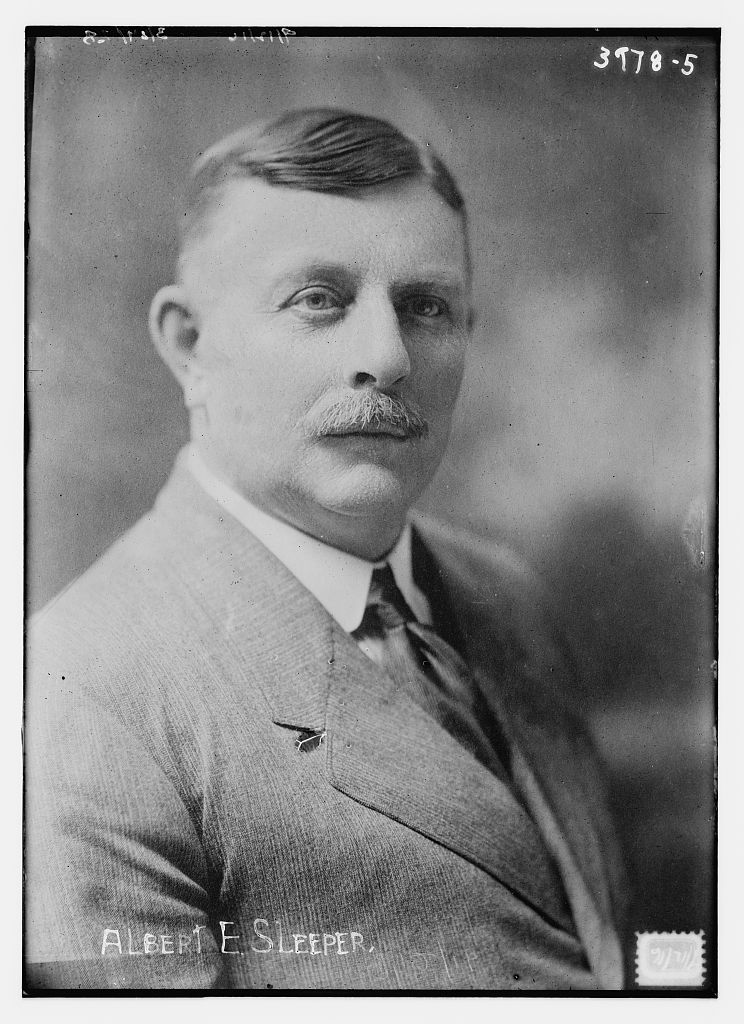
Albert Sleeper

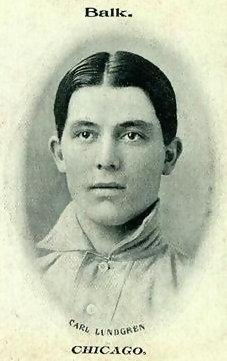
Carl Lundgren

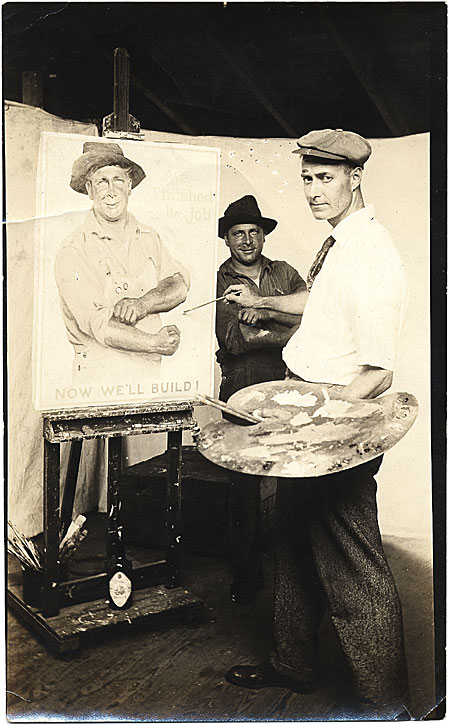
Gerrit Beneker

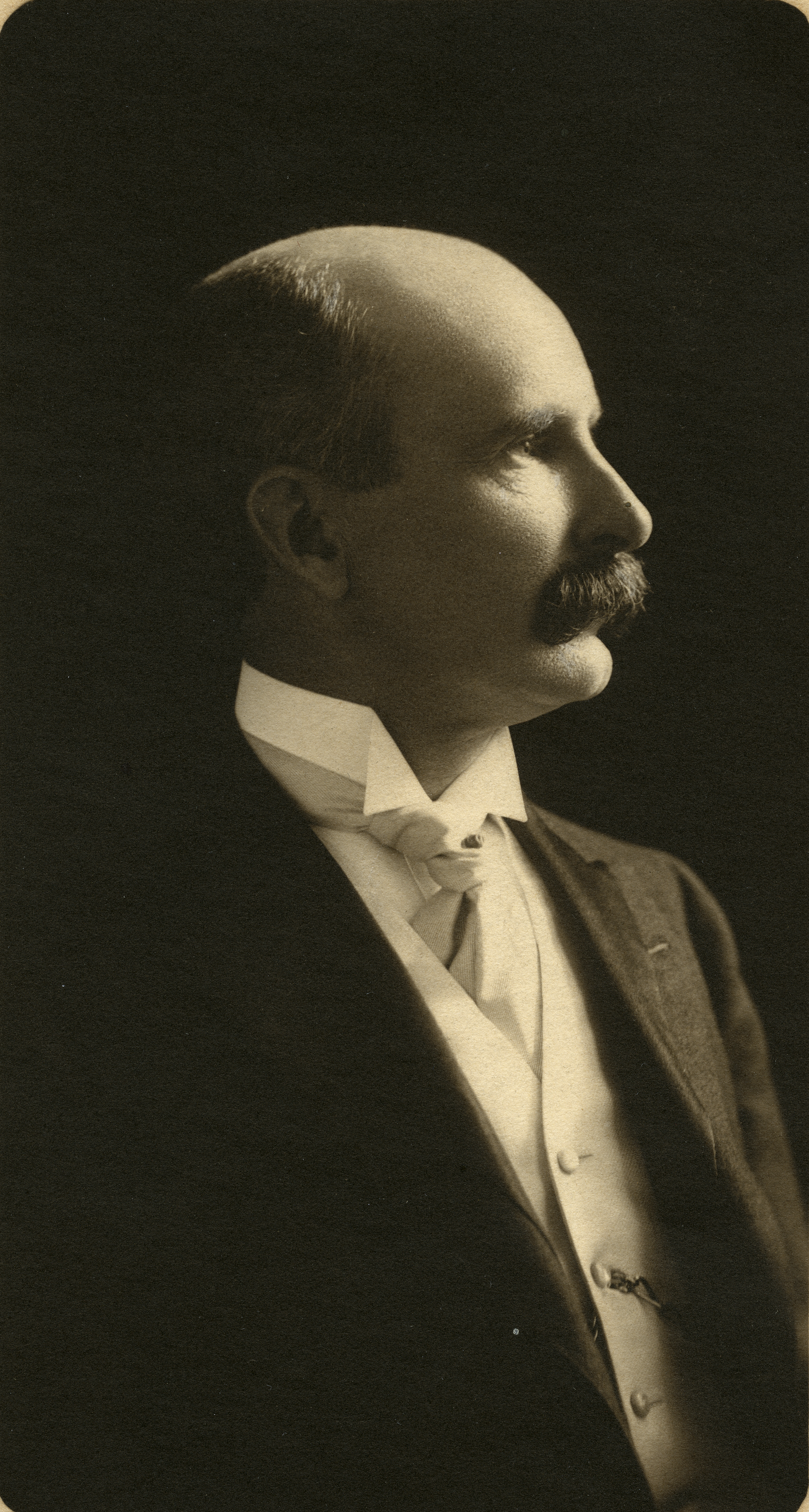
William L. Clements

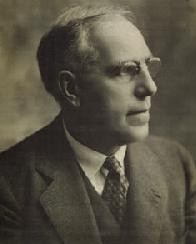
Warren A. Cartier

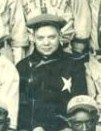
Tenny Blount

== See also ==
- History of Michigan
- History of Detroit
