= List of hotel fires in the United States =

The National Fire Protection Association (NFPA) has documented several dozen hotel fires in the United States since the 1930s that each killed more than ten people, deeming these incidents fires of historical note. The Winecoff Hotel fire of December 7, 1946, in Atlanta, Georgia, which claimed 119 lives, is the deadliest hotel fire disaster in United States history.

== 1870s ==
=== Southern Hotel ===
This fire broke out around 1 am on April 11, 1877, killing 21 people at the Southern Hotel in St. Louis, Missouri. The fire may have been burning for half an hour before the alarm sounded. The building was reduced to smoking ruins, and a replacement Southern Hotel was built on the site in 1880.

== 1880s ==
=== Newhall House Hotel ===
On January 10, 1883, a fire destroyed the Newhall House Hotel in Milwaukee, Wisconsin, killing 71 people. The disaster was investigated by reporters of The Daily Journal (now Milwaukee Journal), newly edited by Lucius W. Nieman. The paper reported an "appalling story of neglect, falsehood, manipulation and concealing of truth that preceded the tragedy." The Journal's exposeé secured it subscriptions, giving it viability in Milwaukee's competitive newspaper market.

The city block where Newall house was located became Milwaukee's "death block" when Fire Chief James Foley and three firemen died there in 1903. Then October 26, 1913, seven people, including some firemen, died fighting fire on the block.

== 1890s ==
=== Windsor Hotel ===
On March 17, 1899, in the deadliest hotel fire in New York City history, the Windsor Hotel was destroyed, with approximately 86 persons killed.

== 1900s ==
=== Park Avenue Hotel ===
On February 22, 1902, the Park Avenue Hotel in New York City was partially destroyed by a million-dollar fire that killed at least 17.

== 1910s ==
=== Hotel Adams Fire ===
The Hotel Adams in Phoenix, Arizona was completely destroyed by an early morning fire which started in the hotel's basement. Two people were killed in the blaze.

=== Dewey Hotel ===
The three-story Dewey Hotel in Omaha, Nebraska was destroyed by fire in the early morning of February 28, 1913. An estimated 20 people were killed and many injured, though exact numbers are unknown. It is believed the fire may have been caused by a gas leak, leading to an explosion from the overloaded furnace.

=== Arcadia Hotel ===
On December 3, 1913, a fire in the Arcadia Hotel, a flophouse on Washington Street in Boston's South End, killed 28 and injured 50. The fire was caused by the ignition of garbage in a closet above the boiler.

== 1930s ==
=== Kerns Hotel ===
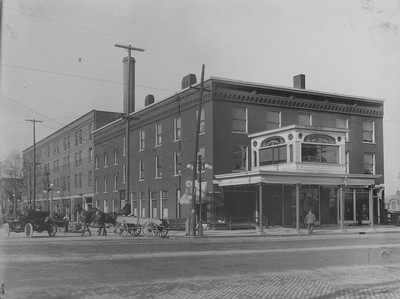
Kerns Hotel in its early days, shown at left in background. The three-story Hotel Wentworth shown in the foreground survived the fire.

On December 11, 1934, shortly before 5:30 am, a fire broke out in the Kerns Hotel in Lansing, Michigan. 34 people died and 44 were injured, including 14 firemen. The 211-room four-story hotel was constructed of brick with a wooden interior, and the fire spread rapidly, trapping many of the hotel's 215 guests in their rooms and forcing them to escape via fire ladders or life nets. Among the dead were seven Michigan state legislators: state senator John Leidlein and state representatives T. Henry Howlett, Charles D. Parker, Vern Voorhees, John W. Goodwine, Don E. Sias, and D. Knox Hanna, who were in town for a special session of the state legislature. Several other state legislators were injured but survived. The fire was thought to have been caused by careless smoking. It is regarded by the Lansing Fire Department as the worst fire disaster in Lansing history.

=== Terminal Hotel ===
On May 16, 1938, a fire broke out in the Terminal Hotel in Atlanta, Georgia, killing 35 people, although some sources claim the death toll was either 27 or 34. The five-story hotel was located at Spring and Mitchell Streets across the street from Terminal Station in the Hotel Row district. The fire broke out in the basement and shortly thereafter a bellhop heard a kitchen boy yell, "O Lawdy, fire". The fire spread quickly, choking off fire escapes and stairs just a few seconds after it caught. The building was fully ablaze minutes after the alarm bell sounded shortly after 3:00 am. Soon after the fire team arrived, the roof collapsed, hampering rescue efforts. Traffic was blocked off for blocks around since the walls were also in danger of collapsing. One hotel guest reported having to jump from the second-floor elevator cage. Several people were killed leaping from the building, including William Oscar Webster, a railroad engineer from Columbus, Georgia, who had jumped from a fourth-floor window. Firemen reported that they later found a whole family dead in one room, a woman in a rocking chair, a man and a boy stretched across the bed, and a girl kneeling by it.

George P. Jones, the hotel manager, reported that there were about 75 people in the hotel at the time of the fire; a substantial number of them were railroad workers. The hotel was rebuilt in 1938 and not included in the Hotel Row District.

== 1940s ==
=== Marlborough Hotel ===
On January 3, 1940, a fire broke out in the aging Marlborough Hotel in Minneapolis, Minnesota, killing 19 people. It was the city's deadliest fire. The fire burned quickly through walls and doors and engulfed most of the hotel's 56 single rooms and 23 apartment units, where some 123 tenants were asleep. The guests either fled through the corridors with coats over their heads or jumped from their rooms and were killed because the stairways were blocked by fire. Some fell to their deaths when floors collapsed, notably the second floor, and buried them in the basement under tons of debris. One child trapped on the third floor screamed for 15 minutes before he died in the flames. One man, James Brown, pushed his wife Mabel from a window when she refused to jump; she was killed but he survived. Another woman jumped head-first out of a window and was killed instantly. A resident across the street reported that he awoke to hear "the worst screams I ever heard" and saw that half the block in which the hotel was located was completely ablaze.

Fifteen fire engines and five trucks containing some 130 firemen were called to the fire in icy January conditions, temperature −5 °C (41 °F). At least 40 people were injured in the fire, including 2 firemen, and 23 required hospital treatment. The hotel was completely gutted and reduced just to a "charred hollow rectangle." Fire Chief Huttner initially though the fire was caused by a boiler that exploded in the furnace room, but it was later concluded that it was a "heat explosion" caused by a burning cigarette thrown in a garbage chute that set fire to the hotel's thin wooden walls. The garbage caught fire and became a ball of fire that exploded in "volcanic violence."

=== Gulf Hotel ===
On September 7, 1943, a fire broke out in the Gulf Hotel in downtown Houston, Texas, killing 55 people. The fire remains the deadliest in Houston's history.

=== New Amsterdam Hotel ===
On March 28, 1944, a fire, believed to be deliberately set, destroyed the New Amsterdam Hotel in San Francisco, California. It was the worst fire in that city since the 1906 San Francisco earthquake, killing 22 and injuring 27. On August 3, 1944, George Holman, a 47-year old cafe proprietor, was found guilty of 22 counts of murder in the first degree for setting the fire. On August 15, he was sentenced to 22 concurrent life terms in prison.

=== General Clark Hotel ===
On January 16, 1945, a fire at the General Clark Hotel on the north side of the loop in Chicago, Illinois, killed 14 people. Six were hospitalized with injuries. Fire Marshall Michael J. Corrigan described it as the worst fire in the loop district in 25 years.

=== La Salle Hotel ===
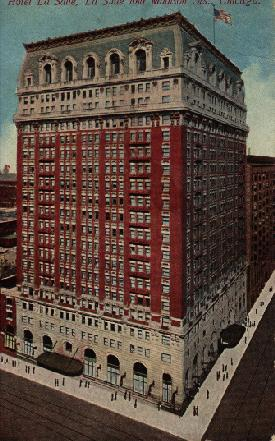
La Salle Hotel in Chicago, Illinois

On June 5, 1946, a fire broke out in the La Salle Hotel in Chicago, killing 61 people, many of them children. The fire began in the Silver Grill Cocktail Lounge on the lower floor on the LaSalle Street side adjacent to the lobby, spread quickly through the highly varnished wood paneling in the lounge and the mezzanine balcony overlooking the lobby, and rose through stairwells and shafts. According to the Chicago Fire Department the fire started either in the walls or ceiling at around 12:15 am, but they were not notified until 12:35 am. While a significant number died from the flames, a greater number of deaths were caused by suffocation from the smoke. Around 900 guests were able to leave the building but some 150 required rescue by fire services and members of the public, including two sailors who were reported to have rescued 27 people between them. Two-thirds of hotel fire deaths in 1946 occurred in the La Salle fire and the Winecoff fire in Atlanta. The La Salle fire prompted the Chicago city council to enact new hotel building codes and firefighting procedures, including the installation of automatic alarm systems and fire safety instructions inside hotel rooms. The hotel was refurbished after the fire and was finally demolished in July 1976; its lot is now occupied by the Two North LaSalle office building.

=== Canfield Hotel ===
On June 19, 1946, two weeks after the La Salle Hotel fire, a fire broke out in the six-story 200-room Canfield Hotel in Dubuque, Iowa, killing 19 people. The fire started around 11:30 pm in a closet near the cocktail lounge on the ground floor and destroyed the four-story section of the building, which was built in 1891. Contributing factors that added to the severity of this incident were delayed alarms, open stairways, and the presence of combustible materials. According to fire captain Harold Cosgrove, 30 people were rescued by jumping onto nets and 27 were carried down ladders.

=== Winecoff Hotel ===
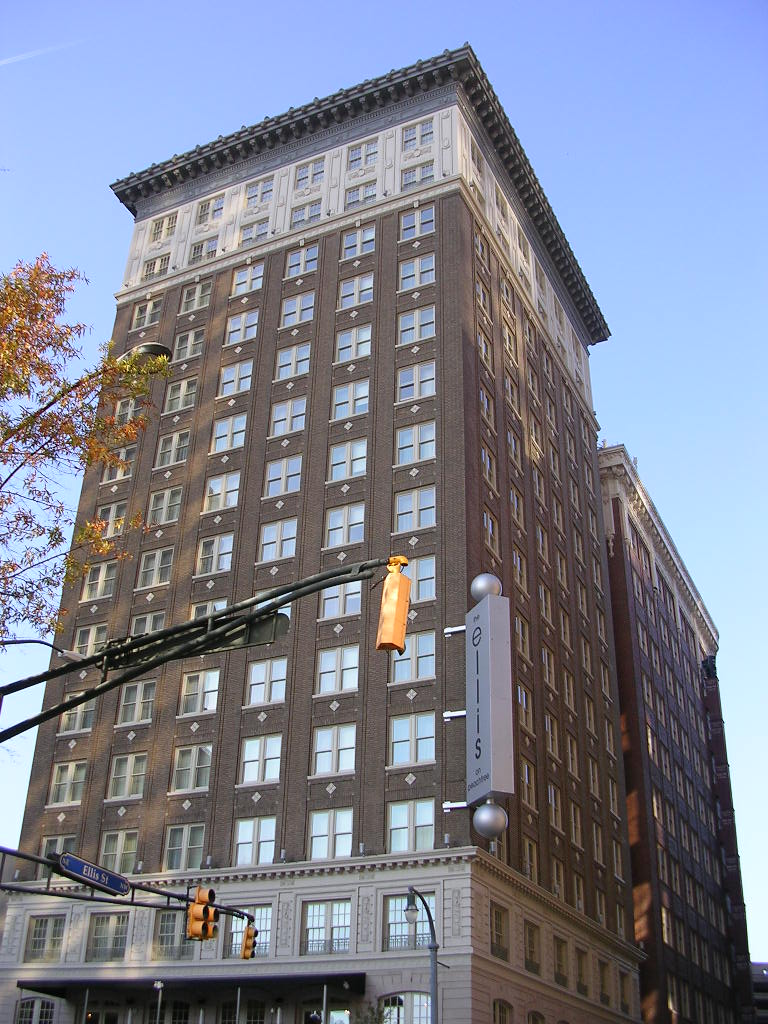
Winecoff Hotel

On December 7, 1946, a fire broke out in the Winecoff Hotel in Atlanta, Georgia, killing 119 people. As of 2021 it remained the deadliest hotel fire in United States history; it prompted many changes in building codes across the nation.

The fire started in the 15-story building early in the morning, and engulfed all floors of the hotel. The only escape route was a single stairway; the building had no fire sprinklers, fire escapes, fire doors, or even an alarm bell. The fire spread throughout the building via the stairway. Caught unaware, many people were trapped on the upper floors, and most of the deaths were among people forced to jump. Atlanta firefighters could reach only up to the eighth floor with ladders, and the nets they spread could not hold many who jumped into them—holding capacity was limited to jumps from up to 70 ft—and many people died on the sidewalks behind the hotel.

Guests at the hotel included teenagers attending a Tri-Y Youth Conference organized by the YMCA in the city, Christmas shoppers, and people in town to see the film Song of the South. Arnold Hardy, a 26-year-old graduate student at Georgia Tech, became the first amateur to win a Pulitzer Prize for Photography for his snapshot of a woman, later identified as survivor Daisy McCumber, in mid-air after jumping from the 11th floor of the hotel during the fire. McCumber, born in 1905, broke her back, pelvis and both legs, but survived. Over a 10-year period, she underwent seven surgeries and lost a leg, but still worked until retirement age and lived until 1992. A plaque was erected at the scene as a memorial to the dead and the survivors, and to the firefighters who, with limited resources, tackled the fire and its consequences.

Due to its dark history, the rebuilt version of the hotel switched hands often until it was refurbished into the Ellis Hotel. The Ellis Hotel currently stands in the same spot in Peachtree as the Winecoff did.

== 1950s ==
=== Barton Hotel ===
Considered one of Chicago's worst flophouse blazes, a fire broke out in the five-story Barton Hotel on West Madison on February 12, 1955, killing 29 people and gutting the hotel, a 49-year-old structure with 336 tiny four-by-six-foot rooms with seven-foot high chicken-wire ceilings, where the nightly rate was 65 cents per person.

There were 245 people staying at the hotel that night. At 2:00 am, the night manager exited his office room to check commotion in the hall and discovered an already large fire that singed him badly. He immediately rang the fire alarm bell and rushed to wake guests by banging on room doors, but many were sleeping too soundly, and he then ran out of the hotel. Many people who woke up could not escape and died in the rooms. A few broke the window panes and jumped out, or escaped down the fire escape. The fire department was also able to save some. 29 people died in the fire, many of them charred beyond recognition. The fire is attributed to a cigarette butt thrown accidentally by a 70-year-old man into a utensil containing alcohol used for massaging; he was killed.

== 1960s ==
=== Surfside Hotel ===
On November 18, 1963, a fire broke out in the Surfside Hotel convalescent home in Atlantic City, New Jersey, killing 25 people, mostly elderly Jews. The fire spread to adjacent buildings, which were closed for the season except for workmen, who were able to escape. Police suspected the fire was set by a known arsonist who boarded a bus shortly after the fire started.

=== Hotel Roosevelt ===
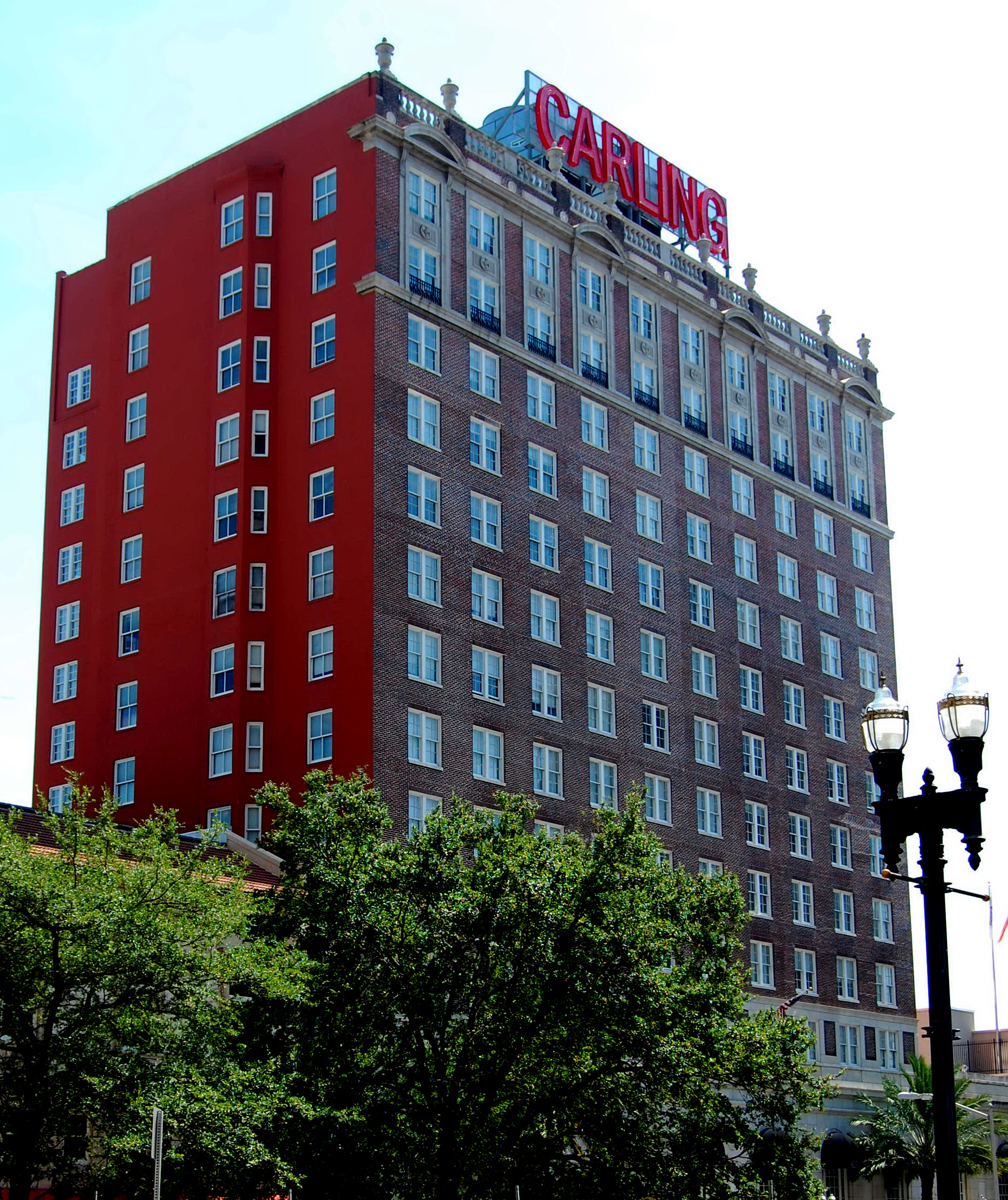
The former Hotel Roosevelt, now the Carling Hotel

On Sunday, December 29, 1963, a fire broke out in the 13-floor Hotel Roosevelt in Jacksonville, Florida, killing 22 people. The fire broke out at around 7:30 am in the ballroom ceiling due to faulty wiring, and by 7:45 am, the Jacksonville Fire Department had been called, later bringing three fire engines, two ladder trucks, a fire chief and two assistant chiefs; the mayor at the time, W. Haydon Burns, also requested eight helicopters from the U.S. Navy, and helicopters from Naval Air Station Jacksonville, Naval Air Reserve Training Unit Jacksonville, and Naval Air Station Cecil Field responded. By 9:30 am the fire had been suppressed, and approximately 475 people were successfully rescued, including 4 from the roof. However, 21 of the people who died in the fire died in their beds of smoke inhalation; the other fatality was assistant chief J.R. Romedy of the Jacksonville Fire Department, who died of a heart attack on the scene during the rescue effort.

It was the worst single-day death toll in Jacksonville's history; even the Great Fire of 1901 had fewer fatalities. Extensive archives on the fire, including valuable photographs, exist within the Jacksonville Fire Museum.

=== Hotel Carleton ===
In January 1966, a fire broke out in the Hotel Carleton in St. Paul, Minnesota, killing 11 people.

=== Paramount Hotel ===
On January 28, 1966, a fire broke out in the 11-story Paramount Hotel in Boston, Massachusetts, killing 11 people and injuring 57. Preceding the fire, an odor of natural gas was detected in the stairway going down to the first floor. The explosion was caused by a gas leak from a main pipe in Boylston Street that seeped into the hotel's basement.

=== Lane Hotel ===
In September 1966, a fire broke out in the two-story 33-room frame Lane Hotel in the main business district of Anchorage, Alaska, killing 14 people. The fire started at 1:17 am and spread rapidly; the flames were reported to be very intense and many bodies were burned beyond recognition. However, several victims died of asphyxiation from the heavy wood smoke. More than half of the occupants of the hotel died in the fire; only 25 guests were reported to have been registered at the time. The owner of the hotel, Virgil McVicker, believed that the fire was caused by an explosion in the boiler room. It was later revealed it wasn’t from an explosion, but from an act of arson. The perpetrator, 35-year-old, Charles Thessen, an unemployed cook, was revealed to have been the arsonist. He was soon arrested and it became the first time Alaska used the Miranda warnings for a suspect. Initially wanting to charge him with first-degree murder, he was charged and later convicted of manslaughter instead. The Lane Hotel fire became the worst mass murder in Alaska’s history and one of the largest loss of lives in Alaska.

=== New Ocean House ===
On May 8, 1969, The New Ocean House in Swampscott, Massachusetts was destroyed by a fire. There were no guests at the time; only a clerk and three kitchen workers were in the building. The fire started in the rear of the building and the first alarm was struck at 9:53 pm. The hotel's sprinkler system and misty air helped suppress the fire and firefighters initially thought it could be contained. However, intense heat forced them back and the fire spread along the roof to the front of the building. Firefighting efforts were hampered by narrow streets and low water pressure and by 12:30 am the fire spread across the entire 300-foot front of the building. By 1:00 am the fire was out of control. Crews from 25 communities fought the blaze, which was not extinguished until 2:48 pm on May 10. No cause was determined, however a hotel spokesperson stated that it may have started in a staging area erected for plumbing work.

== 1970s ==
=== Ozark Hotel ===
On March 20, 1970, a fire caused by arson broke out in the lobby of the Ozark Hotel in Seattle, Washington, at about 2:30 am (a melted clock on the second floor showed the time of 2:45). It spread through two stairways and all the halls, killing 20 people (14 men and 6 women) and seriously injuring 10 others in 63 minutes until firefighters extinguished it. It was said to be the worst arson fire in Seattle.

The hotel was a 60-year-old wooden building of five floors with 60 rooms and was a "flophouse" housing many impoverished and elderly people. It was well known as a "high risk facility" to the Seattle Fire Department, and had been inspected six times between February 6, 1970, and the day before the fire. On the night of the fire, 42 of 62 rooms were occupied. The fire was set in two places; in the main stairwell on the first floor and in the rear of the second floor; a wayside straggler alerted the authorities. The fire quickly engulfed the two staircases and the lobby separating them. Open transoms in the rooms helped spread the fire. The top two floors collapsed. Those who could not reach the fire escape tried to jump from the windows of their rooms. The saving grace in the building was an open core area with a large shaft up to the second floor, which enabled two people to escape. The fire department devoted 14 engines and four ladders with a complement of over 100 firemen and 20 units to the fire and were able to control it within 50 minutes. The deaths were from smoke inhalation, burns, cuts and other injuries.

Since the building lacked modern firefighting facilities, Seattle made major changes to its fire codes. However, the new rules reportedly made many people homeless in the 1980s, since residents of low-income housing could not afford to make the mandated changes and hence deserted their houses. Even small hotels with single occupancy rooms could not adapt to the rules.

The arsonists were never caught, despite a large police inquiry.

=== Ponet Square Hotel ===
On September 13, 1970, a fire broke out in the Ponet Square Hotel at Pico Boulevard and Grand Avenue in Los Angeles, killing 19 people. After the fire, safety doors to enclosed stairwells—later known as "Ponet Doors", after the hotel—were installed in all pre-1943 residential structures of three stories or more in Los Angeles.

=== Pioneer International ===
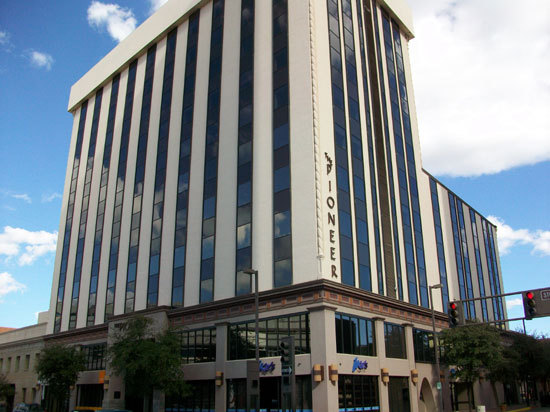
Pioneer International

On December 20, 1970, a fire broke out in the 11-story Pioneer International on the corner of North Stone Avenue and Pennington Street in Tucson, Arizona, killing 28 people, including several children and teenagers, and injuring 27. 13 prominent Mexicans were among the dead, including two grandchildren of Ignacio Soto, a former governor of Sonora; the wife and five children of Francisco Luken, a Sonora police chief; and Jose Jesus Antillon, a top Mexican cardiologist.

The hotel was built in 1929. The fire started on the sixth floor and spread rapidly through the hallways and staircases, trapping more than 60 people, but most escaped through windows. The majority of the occupants of the hotel at the time were attending three different banquets on the ground floor and those 650 or so people were easily evacuated. Of the 28 who died, 16 died of carbon monoxide poisoning, 7 from burns and 1 from smoke inhalation. One woman died after jumping from the seventh floor and three others died from jumping, one of them a small boy, who was found on the lower east wing roof. Two firemen were injured, including a fire captain who hung upside down on a 45-foot (14 m) broken ladder for 25 minutes before being rescued.

Although the hotel was supposed to be fireproof, synthetic carpeting, vinyl wall covering, painted doors and frames and open stairways fueled the spread of the fire, especially given that there were no sprinklers or smoke detectors. The fire was reported to be an arson attack and a 16-year-old, Louis C. Taylor, was charged with felony homicide and arson. He was found guilty of starting a fire in at least two places in the hotel and imprisoned for life, although he never admitted causing the fire. He was released on April 2, 2013, after his conviction was called into question.

The hotel remained standing after the fire and was renovated in 1977 and converted into offices. Since the conversion, paranormal activity has frequently been reported in the building, including the smell of smoke during the night, running on the upper floors, lights turning on and off, and apparitions.

=== Pennsylvania House Hotel ===
On January 16, 1972, a fire broke out in the Pennsylvania House Hotel in Tyrone, Pennsylvania, killing 12 people. The 75-year-old hotel lacked alarm systems, sprinklers, smoke detectors, and stairway fire doors. None were required when the hotel was built, and no local safety codes required their subsequent installation. The temperature at the time was well below zero; firefighters had to change clothes frequently after being drenched thawing out hoses and hydrants, and ice axes were used to search for victims. 31 people were treated at Tyrone Hospital, including 28 volunteer firefighters, mainly for frostbite and smoke inhalation rather than burns.

=== Washington House Hotel ===
At about 2:30 am on August 25, 1974, a fire broke out in the Washington House Hotel at the corner of Fairfax and Washington Streets in Berkeley Springs, West Virginia, killing 12 people and spreading from the brick building to seven adjoining buildings. The fire's intense heat melted the face of the clock in the tower of the Morgan County Courthouse.

=== Pomona Hotel ===
On July 7, 1975, a fire broke out in the Pomona Hotel in Portland, Oregon, killing 11 people (initially reported as 8). 26 were injured, 8 of them critically. The alarm was raised about 11 pm when smoke was seen drifting out of a second-story window and a man was hanging from a window; he was later rescued by firemen. The extent of the fire was minimal but it created considerable thick smoke, which hampered rescue efforts. The fire was ruled arson and a suspect was taken into custody, having been seen at the hotel and purchasing gasoline.

=== Hotel Pathfinder ===
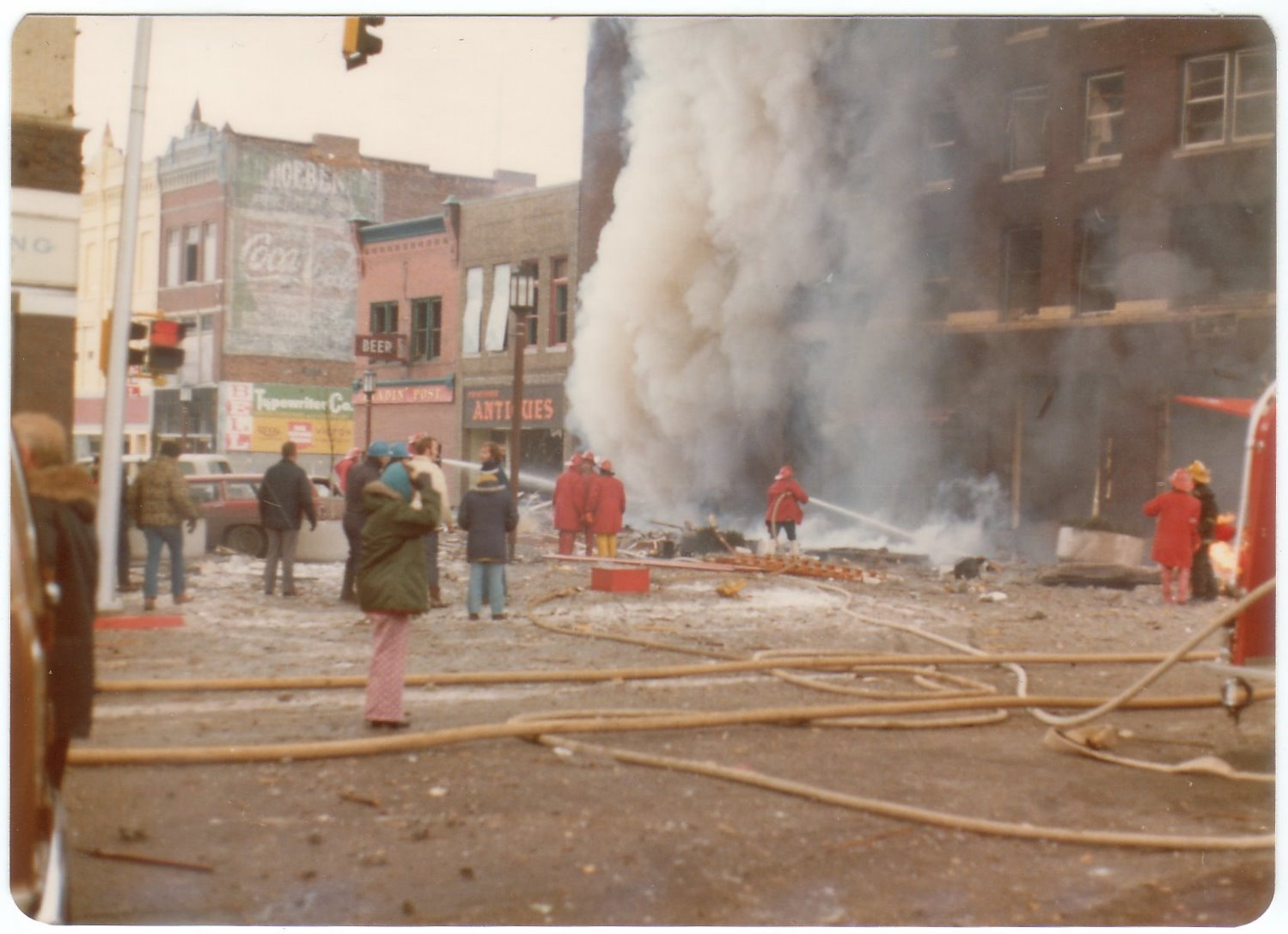
Hotel Pathfinder explosion. View of fire crew and debris looking south-east from Broad and 6th St. in Fremont, Nebraska.

On January 10, 1976, a fire broke out in the Hotel Pathfinder in Fremont, Nebraska, killing 20 people. The fire was fueled by a natural gas leak at the hotel, which caused an explosion that blew out the windows of the hotel and shattered glass as far as nine blocks away. A flight instructor and a student pilot flying over the city at the time experienced severe turbulence. The hotel was later demolished in February 1977.

=== Stratford Hotel ===
In January 1977, a fire broke out in the Stratford Hotel in Breckenridge, Minnesota, killing 17 people.

=== Wenonah Park Hotel ===
In December 1977, a fire broke out in the Wenonah Hotel in Bay City, Michigan, killing 10 people.

=== Coates House Hotel ===
On January 28, 1978, a fire broke out in the six-story Coates House Hotel at 1005 Broadway in Downtown Kansas City, Missouri, killing 20 people and injuring at least 6. It is the worst fire disaster in the history of Kansas City. The Coates House was a former luxury hotel, and the building dated to 1886 and was listed on the National Register of Historic Places, but it had become a single room occupancy hotel mainly housing the poor and elderly.

The fire broke out around 4 am and the Kansas City, Missouri Fire department was alerted at 4:12 am by the desk clerk. The station of the first companies due at the scene was only 100 feet down an alley to the southeast of the hotel, yet they saw no smoke or fire when they arrived about two minutes later. Other companies arriving from the south on Broadway saw smoke coming from a few upper-story windows of the hotel. A second alarm was requested at 4:17 am, and ultimately the fire went to four alarms and at its height 23 fire trucks and at least 90 firemen were on the scene, more than three-quarters of all available on-duty Kansas City fire companies, including companies from Kansas City, Kansas. It took more than four hours to bring under control. At one point the aerial ladder of one company's truck, which was more than 25 years old, froze barely a dozen feet in the air. At least five of the fire's fatalities were people who jumped from the upper stories. More than 100 survivors were taken by bus to the downtown Salvation Army Center. The hotel was gutted and the southern wing destroyed.

=== Allen Motor Inn ===
On November 5, 1978, a fire broke out in the Allen Motor Inn in Honesdale, Pennsylvania, killing 12 people and injuring 5. The hotel had been the first concrete building in the state when it was built in 1858. Arson was suspected; there had been two other fires at the building in the previous two months. Frederick Weiler Blady, a 36-year-old drifter from New Jersey, was arrested and charged with arson in connection with this fire and with a previous fire at the same hotel on October 5, 1978. Blady was convicted of starting the October fire, but was found not guilty of the fatal November fire.

=== Holiday Inn (Greece, New York) ===
A fire broke out on November 26, 1978, at the Holiday Inn-Northwest in the Town of Greece, near Rochester, New York, and killed 10 people. 7 of the fatalities were Canadian; more than 130 Canadians were staying in the hotel at the time on a holiday shopping trip.

The fire started on the first floor between the north and west wings of the hotel around 2:30 am. Cleaning supplies and paper products were stored in a closet near the fire's point of origin. Because of fire doors being left open and the nearby combustible materials, the fire spread very rapidly. The fire alarm system was not tied to the local fire department, and although some people reported a bell ringing, they failed to realize it was the emergency alarm bell. The fire was reported to the fire department at 2:38 am by Harold Phillips, an off-duty firefighter who was passing by. Initially the police did not consider the fire suspicious, but was officially ruled arson after an expert fire investigator brought in from New York City discovered that an uncommon and highly flammable chemical had been used to ignite it. No one was ever charged with the crime; in 2015 suspicions were raised that Phillips himself, who had since become the town's fire chief, might have set the fire.

=== Holiday Inn (Cambridge, Ohio) ===
On July 31, 1979, a fire broke out in the Holiday Inn in Cambridge, Ohio, killing 10 people and injuring 82. An arsonist, Gerald Willey of Randolph, Ohio, had poured gasoline on the carpet on the first floor of the two-story roadside motel and set it on fire with a lighted match. Willey was later convicted of 1 count of aggravated arson and 10 counts of involuntary manslaughter, and was sentenced to 14–50 years at Mansfield Reformatory. However, a well-known Cincinnati lawyer named Stanley Chesley held the motel responsible, arguing that the people on the second floor of the motel died from choking by toxic smoke and not by fire and that they were unable to escape because the floor-to-ceiling windows at the back of each room were not designed to be opened and had therefore trapped them. The liability case was settled out of court for US$6 million.

== 1980s ==
=== MGM Grand Hotel ===
On November 21, 1980, a fire broke out in the MGM Grand Hotel (now Horseshoe Las Vegas) in Paradise, Nevada, killing 85 people, most through smoke inhalation. It remains the worst disaster in Nevada history, and the third-worst hotel fire in modern U.S. history.

At the time of the fire, approximately 5,000 people were in the hotel and casino, a 26-story luxury resort with more than 2,000 hotel rooms. Just after 7:00 on the morning of November 21, 1980, a fire broke out in a restaurant known as The Deli. The Clark County Fire Department was the first agency to respond. Other agencies that responded included the North Las Vegas Fire Department, Las Vegas Fire & Rescue and the Henderson Fire Department. Smoke and fire spread through the building, killing 85 people and injuring 650, including guests, employees and 14 firefighters. While the fire primarily damaged the second floor casino and adjacent restaurants, most of the deaths were on the upper floors of the hotel, and were caused by smoke inhalation. Openings in vertical shafts (elevators and stairwells) and seismic joints allowed toxic smoke to spread to the top floor. The disaster led to the general publicizing of the fact that during a building fire, smoke inhalation is a more serious threat than flames. 75 people died from smoke inhalation and carbon monoxide poisoning and 4 from smoke inhalation alone; only 4 people died as a result of burns.

On February 10, 1981, 90 days after the MGM fire, a smaller fire broke out at the Las Vegas Hilton. Because of the two incidents, there was a major reformation of state fire safety guidelines and codes.

=== Stouffer's Inn of Westchester ===
On December 4, 1980, a fire broke out at the Stouffer's Inn of Westchester, a newly built hotel and conference center in Purchase, New York, killing 26 people. The fire started in the two-level conference center of the hotel, adjacent to the four-story, 365-room hotel tower. It spread rapidly because of a lack of sufficient sprinklers and the use of highly flammable carpeting and wall coverings; New York had no statewide fire code at the time. Together with the MGM Grand fire, the Stouffer's Inn fire led to the adoption of stricter fire codes on the state and national levels. The fire was said to be a deliberate act but no one was convicted of causing it. The coffee waiter who was the chief suspect was arrested and initially convicted by the jury, but was later released by the judge for lack of evidence. The hotel reopened on April 4, 1981, four months after the fire. It today operates as the Renaissance Westchester Hotel.

=== Westchase Hilton Hotel ===
In March 1982, a fire broke out in the Westchase Hilton Hotel in Houston, Texas. 12 people died in the hotel, which was opened in 1980. A report by the National Fire Protection Association (NFPA) identified one reason for the deaths as inadequate escape routes: the stairways were located at the end of the corridor, so that as the hallways filled with smoke, people were unable to reach them and suffocated. In addition, a staff member repeatedly reset the alarm system, preventing transmission of information about the fire to the Fire Department, and a poorly closing door allowed smoke to spread. The fire was caused by a smoldering cigarette that had been dropped on a chair in a room on the fourth floor.

=== Alexander Hamilton Hotel ===
An arson fire burned the Alexander Hamilton Hotel in Paterson, New Jersey, on October 18, 1984, killing 15 and injuring 60 others. A resident of the hotel, Russell William Conklin, was convicted of arson and manslaughter and sentenced to 20 years in prison; he served 12 years before being released in 1997.

=== Elliott Chambers ===
On July 4, 1984, an arson fire set at a low-rent rooming house in Beverly, Massachusetts killed 15 people. The fire was set by a man whose ex-girlfriend was going out with someone who was staying in the building. He set the fire by lighting gasoline-soaked newspapers in an alcove adjacent to the front entrance. It was deadliest fire in the state since the Cocoanut Grove fire in 1942 and the deadliest fire in Beverly's history. James Carver was found guilty of murder and arson in 1989, but his convictions were overturned in 2025 due to advances in fire investigation science and issues with eyewitness testimony.

=== Dupont Plaza ===
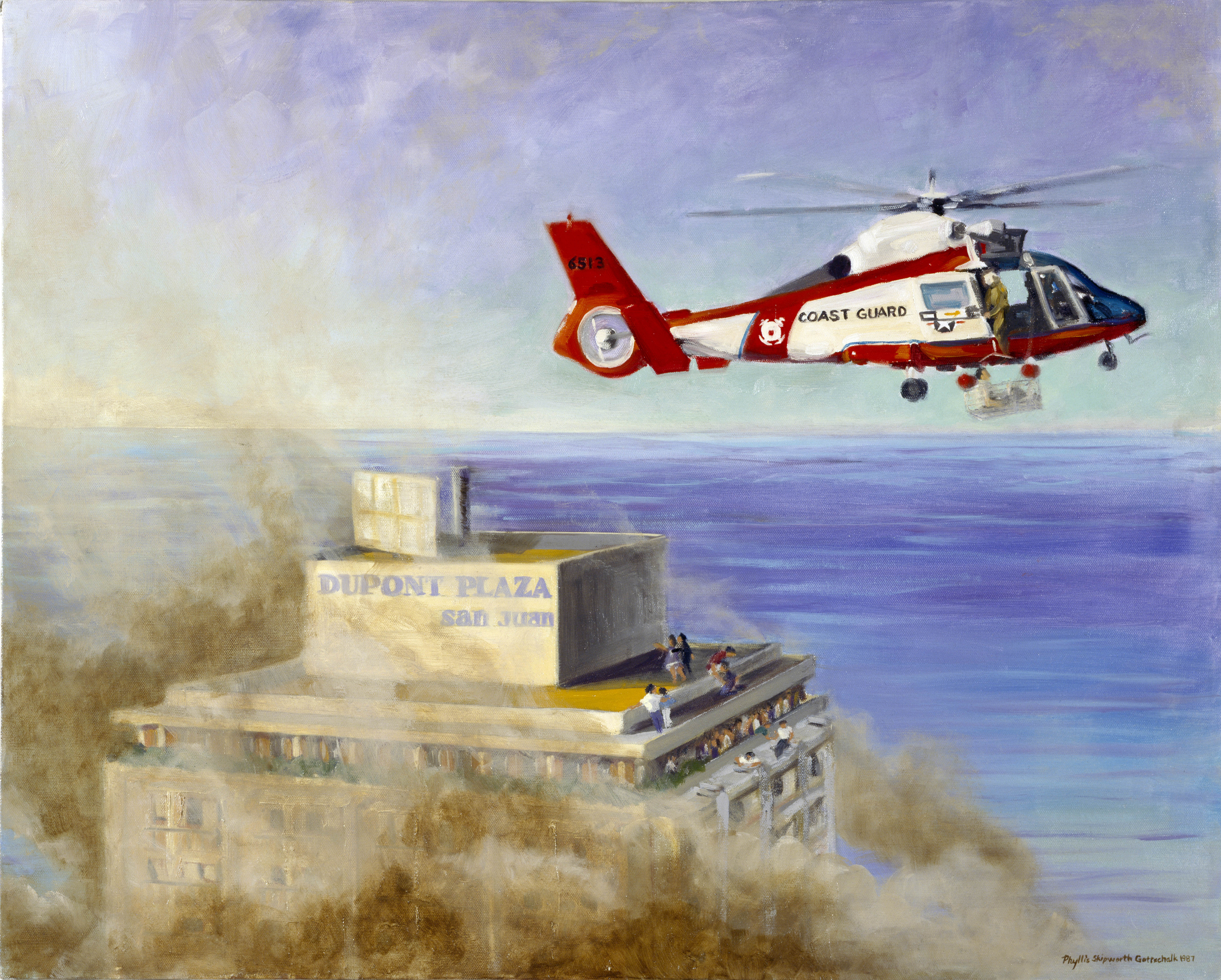
Dupont Plaza Hotel Rescue by Phyllis Gottschalk

Fire broke out in the Dupont Plaza Hotel in San Juan, Puerto Rico, on New Year's Eve 1986, killing 98 people and injuring 140. It was described as one of the worst such fires of the century. The NFPA conducted the inquiry into the causes of the fire, in association with the U.S. Bureau of Alcohol, Tobacco and Firearms and Puerto Rican authorities. It was established that the fire originated in a deliberate act of arson; three people were convicted for this. The inquiry report found that fire spread from new furniture temporarily stacked in a ballroom of size 5.5×9.4×1.8 m (18×31×5.9 ft); the furniture consisted of dressers made of wood and particle board, mattresses and sofa beds, packed in cartons. The fire originated in this room and quickly engulfed the casino and the lobby; smoke spread from the two-story lobby to other floors, and flames spread over an area of 437 m^{2} (4,700 sq ft). Most bodies were charred beyond recognition; 84 charred bodies were found in the casino, 5 in the lobby area, 3 in an elevator and 1 in a guest room on the west side of the hotel.

National TV networks gave live coverage of the fire and the rescue operations undertaken by Puerto Rican firefighters, using helicopter services and rescuing people from the roof of the hotel.

== 1990s ==
=== Hotel St. George ===
On August 26, 1995, a fire broke out in the Clark Building of the 100-year-old Hotel St. George in Brooklyn, New York. The fire consumed four large buildings and required over 700 firefighters operating 110 apparatus to put out. It consisted of 16 alarms, the largest in Brooklyn's history. There were no casualties.

== 2000s ==
=== Mizpah Hotel ===
On October 31, 2006, a fire in the 84-year-old Mizpah Hotel in Reno, Nevada, killed 12 people. Casino cook Valerie Moore was convicted of setting the fire and sentenced to 12 consecutive life prison terms without parole.
