= John Dykstra (politician) =

American politician

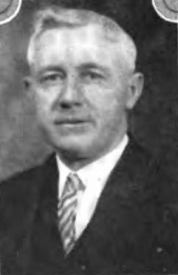
Michigan State Representative John Dykstra

John Dykstra (born January 16, 1875 – died 1959) was a member of the Michigan House of Representatives from 1927 to 1934. A Republican, he was defeated for reelection in 1934; he later unsuccessfully ran for Michigan State Senate. Dykstra was born in Holland, Michigan, and served as a street railway motorman outside politics. He was a survivor of the devastating fire at the Kerns Hotel in Lansing on December 11, 1934 which killed six of his fellow representatives, T. Henry Hewlett, Charles D. Parker, Vern Voorhees, John W. Goodwine, Don E. Sias, and D. Knox Hanna; also killed was state senator John Leidlein.
