= List of special elections to the Michigan House of Representatives =

The following is a list of special elections for the Michigan House of Representatives.

== List of special elections ==
| Date | District | Incumbent | Party | Winner | Party | Cause |
|---|---|---|---|---|---|---|
| May 9–10, 1836 | Wayne | Jonathan P. Fay | Dem. | Charles Moran | Dem. | Death |
| c. April 1837 | Calhoun | Ezra Convis | Dem. | Sands McCamley | Dem. | (Note: Unclear if Ezra Convis resigned or died in office.) |
| 1837 | Monroe | Lemuel Colbath | | Peter Picott (Note: Peter Picott did not take his seat.) | Dem. | Death |
| c. 1838–1839 | Washtenaw | Calvin Smith (Note: Calvin Smith died before taking his seat.) | Whig | Nathan Pierce | Whig | Death |
| 1870 | Wayne 4 | George W. Swift | Rep. | Charles H. Bennett | Dem. | Resigned |
| July 16, 1870 | Eaton 2 | Almon Thompson | Rep. | Albertus L. Green | Rep. | Resigned |
| July 16, 1870 | Hillsdale 2 | Harvey B. Rowlson | Rep. | James H. Armstrong | Rep. | Resigned |
| July 16, 1870 | St. Clair 1 | Nathan Boynton | Rep. | Tubal C. Owen | Rep. | Resigned |
| March 5, 1872 | Jackson 3 | John Landon | Rep. | Hiram C. Hodge | Dem. | Death |
| March 6, 1872 | Genesee 3 | John I. Phillips | Rep. | Frederick Walker | Rep. | Death |
| c. March 1872 | Bay | William R. Bates | Rep. | Isaac Marston | L. Rep. | Resigned |
| February 23, 1874 | Berrien 3 | Evan J. Bonine | Rep. | Ethan A. Brown | Dem. | Resigned |
| February 23, 1874 | Genesee 2 | Levi Walker | Rep. | Leroy Parker | Rep. | Death |
| February 23, 1874 | Manistee | Merritt N. Chafey | Rep. | Andrew J. Dovell | Dem. | Resigned |
| February 23, 1874 | Marquette | Edward Breitung | Rep. | Henry J. Colwell | Dem. | Resigned |
| February 23, 1874 | Shiawassee 2 | Benjamin Walker | Rep. | Lorison J. Taylor | Rep. | Death |
| February 26, 1874 | Allegan 2 | Charles W. Watkins | Rep. | William F. Hardin | | Resigned |
| April 1875 | Van Buren 2 | George G. B. Yeckley | Rep. | William Thomas | Rep. | Death |
| January 24, 1882 | Lapeer 2 | Frank Kendrick | Rep. | Frederick H. Hill | Rep. | Death |
| April 4, 1898 | Berrien 2 | Edwin Williams | Rep. | Carmi Smith | Rep. | Resigned |
| April 4, 1898 | Lapeer | Henry Lee | Rep. | Edmund Brownell | Rep. | Death |
| September 17, 1907 | Ingham 1 | Stanley D. Montgomery | Rep. | Alex Cohen | Rep. | Resigned |
| 1929 | Wayne 1 | John E. Owen | Rep. | Clarence J. Dacey | Rep. | Resigned |
| April 3, 1933 | Emmet | Dana H. Hinkley | Rep. | Edward Fenlon | Dem. | Death |
| November 7, 1933 | Ingham 1 | John G. Rulison | Dem. | Allen McDonald | Rep. | Death |
| March 4, 1935 | Genesee 2 | Charles Parker | Dem. | Maurice Matthews | Rep. | Death |
| March 4, 1935 | Midland | Don E. Sias | Rep. | Aaron T. Bliss Sr. | Rep. | Death |
| March 4, 1935 | Sanilac | John W. Goodwine | Rep. | Alpheus P. Decker | Rep. | Death |
| March 4, 1935 | Tuscola | D. Knox Hanna | Rep. | Audley Rawson | Rep. | Death |
| April 1, 1935 | St. Clair 1 | Duncan J. McColl Jr. | Rep. | Mervin W. Tomlin | Dem. | Resigned |
| April 2, 1945 | Wayne 1 | James J. Murphy | Dem. | William Minton Donnelly | Dem. | Death |
| April 8, 1947 | Van Buren | Edson V. Root Sr. | Rep. | Glenn B. Robinson | Rep. | Death |
| November 4, 1947 | Wayne 2 | Frank J. Calvert | Rep. | Richard L. Thomson | Rep. | Death |
| November 7, 1950 (Note: Special election held alongside a general election.) | Clinton | John Paxton Espie | Rep. | Andrew W. Cobb | Rep. | Death |
| November 7, 1950 | Jackson 2 | Floyd E. Town | Rep. | Leo Miller | Rep. | Death |
| November 7, 1950 | Kalamazoo 2 | Ural S. Acker | Rep. | Cyril H. Root | Rep. | Death |
| November 7, 1950 | Kent 3 | Fay E. Benjamin | Rep. | Irving Pennington | Rep. | Death |
| November 7, 1950 | Montcalm | Walter G. Herrick | Rep. | George A. Kohn | Rep. | Death |
| March 26, 1952 | St. Joseph | Bert Dickerson | Rep. | John W. Fletcher | Rep. | Death |
| January 10, 1958 | Wayne 3 | Edward Carey | Dem. | William A. Ryan | Dem. | Resigned |
| April 6, 1959 | Ottawa | George Van Peursem | Rep. | Riemer VanTil | Rep. | Resigned |
| August 31, 1959 | Kent 3 | Glenn Hunsberger | Rep. | Martin D. Buth | Rep. | Death |
| December 8, 1959 | Wayne 11 | Charline White | Dem. | David S. Holmes Jr. | Dem. | Death |
| November 8, 1960 | Genesee 2 | George A. Gillespie | Rep. | Gordon Rockwell | Rep. | Death |
| November 8, 1960 | Midland | John C. Morris | Rep. | Nelson Tisdale | Rep. | Resigned |
| November 8, 1960 | Presque Isle | Emil A. Peltz | Rep. | Ross O. Stevens | Rep. | Death |
| November 8, 1960 | Wayne 2 | Frank D. Williams | Dem. | Maxcine Young | Dem. | Resigned |
| March 19, 1962 | Ingham 1 | Ralph H. Young | Rep. | Charles J. Davis | Rep. | Death |
| April 5, 1965 | 2nd | Walter J. Hyso | Dem. | James H. Karoub | Dem. | Death |
| May 10, 1965 | 24th | Daniel W. West | Dem. | James Del Rio | Dem. | Seat declared vacant |
| May 23, 1967 | 19th | Joseph J. Kowalski | Dem. | Anthony C. Licata | Rep. | Death |
| June 6, 1967 | 75th | James S. Nunneley | Rep. | David M. Serotkin | Rep. | Death |
| August 6, 1968 | 44th | Lionel J. Stacey | Rep. | Ray C. Mittan | Rep. | Resigned |
| February 25, 1969 | 41st | Frederic J. Marshall | Rep. | John P. Smeekens | Rep. | Death |
| March 8, 1971 | 4th | William B. Fitzgerald | Dem. | William B. Fitzgerald Jr. | Dem. | Death |
| July 15, 1971 | 54th | Edson V. Root Jr. | Rep. | Bela E. Kennedy | Rep. | Death |
| March 19, 1974 | 15th | James Bradley | Dem. | Joseph F. Young Sr. | Dem. | Resigned |
| June 4, 1974 | 21st | David S. Holmes Jr. | Dem. | Clifford D. Gary | Dem. | Resigned |
| June 25, 1974 | 101st | J. Bob Traxler | Dem. | Colleen Engler | Rep. | Resigned |
| November 5, 1974 | 47th | Jack Welborn | Rep. | Robert A. Welborn | Rep. | Resigned |
| June 28, 1977 | 80th | Harold Scott | Dem. | Thomas E. Scott | Dem. | Resigned |
| June 28, 1977 | 35th | R. Robert Geake | Rep. | Jack Kirksey | Rep. | Resigned |
| May 4, 1978 | 49th | Dan Angel | Rep. | Everitt F. Lincoln | Rep. | Resigned |
| July 11, 1978 | 66th | Monte Geralds | Dem. | Gary Vanek | Dem. | Expelled |
| March 25, 1980 | 36th | Robert C. Law | Rep. | Sylvia Skrel | Rep. | Resigned |
| November 4, 1980 | 81st | Mark Clodfelter | Dem. | Robert L. Emerson | Dem. | Resigned |
| March 23, 1982 | 21st | Barbara-Rose Collins | Dem. | Clifford D. Gary | Dem. | Resigned |
| April 13, 1982 | 29th | Alfred Sheridan | Dem. | Rick Sitz | Dem. | Death |
| June 8, 1982 | 3rd | Casmer P. Ogonowski | Dem. | Clem Bykowski | Dem. | Resigned |
| June 8, 1982 | 69th | Dana F. Wilson | Dem. | Wilfred D. Webb | Dem. | Resigned |
| November 6, 1984 | 20th | Rudy J. Nichols | Rep. | Claude Trim | Rep. | Resigned |
| November 6, 1984 | 21st | Richard Sullivan | Dem. | Lynn Owen | Dem. | Death |
| June 10, 1985 | 93rd | Vern Ehlers | Rep. | Richard Bandstra | Rep. | Resigned |
| November 8, 1988 | 10th | Virgil C. Smith | Dem. | Ted Wallace | Dem. | Resigned |
| January 16, 1990 | 25th | Dennis Dutko | Dem. | D. Roman Kulchitsky | Rep. | Resigned |
| August 27, 1991 | 36th | Gerald H. Law | Rep. | Georgina F. Goss | Rep. | Resigned |
| August 27, 1991 | 65th | Mike Bouchard | Rep. | John Jamian | Rep. | Resigned |
| November 26, 1991 | 18th | Sidney Ouwinga | Rep. | John Gernaat | Rep. | Death |
| November 3, 1992 | 5th | Teola Pearl Hunter | Dem. | Triette Lipsey | Dem. | Resigned |
| June 29, 1993 | 3rd | Joe Young Sr. | Dem. | Mary Lou Parks | Dem. | Death |
| June 29, 1993 | 65th | Philip E. Hoffman | Rep. | Clyde LeTarte | Rep. | Resigned |
| April 26, 1994 | 43rd | Charlie Harrison | Dem. | Hubert Price | Dem. | Resigned |
| April 26, 1994 | 69th | David Hollister | Dem. | Lynne Martinez | Dem. | Resigned |
| April 26, 1994 | 110th | Stephen Shepich | Dem. | Paul Tesanovich | Dem. | Resigned |
| May 16, 1995 | 109th | Dominic Jacobetti | Dem. | Mike Prusi | Dem. | Death |
| November 5, 1996 | 25th | Robert DeMars | Dem. | Gloria Schermesser | Dem. | Death |
| November 5, 1996 | 38th | Bill Bullard Jr. | Rep. | Nancy Cassis | Rep. | Resigned |
| June 17, 1997 | 22nd | Gregory Pitoniak | Dem. | Raymond E. Basham | Dem. | Resigned |
| February 24, 1998 | 32nd | David Jaye | Rep. | Alan Sanborn | Rep. | Resigned |
| March 20, 2001 | 33rd | Janet Kukuk | Rep. | Leon Drolet | Rep. | Death |
| July 10, 2001 | 86th | Valde Garcia | Rep. | Scott Hummel | Rep. | Resigned |
| February 26, 2002 | 32nd | Alan Sanborn | Rep. | Brian Palmer | Rep. | Resigned |
| August 27, 2002 | 9th | Kwame Kilpatrick | Dem. | Fred Durhal Jr. | Dem. | Resigned |
| May 20, 2003 | 65th | Jerry Kratz | Rep. | Mickey Mortimer | Rep. | Death |
| November 7, 2006 | 29th | Clarence Phillips | Dem. | Hayes Jones | Dem. | Resigned |
| November 7, 2006 | 56th | Herb Kehrl | Dem. | Kate Ebli | Dem. | Death |
| November 7, 2006 | 69th | Gretchen Whitmer | Dem. | Mark Meadows | Dem. | Resigned |
| November 2, 2010 | 65th | Mike Simpson | Dem. | Mike Shirkey | Rep. | Death |
| November 2, 2010 | 95th | Andrew Coulouris | Dem. | Stacy Erwin Oakes | Dem. | Resigned |
| February 28, 2012 | 29th | Tim Melton | Dem. | Tim Greimel | Dem. | Resigned |
| February 28, 2012 | 51st | Paul H. Scott | Rep. | Joseph Graves | Rep. | Recalled |
| November 5, 2013 | 49th | Jim Ananich | Dem. | Phil Phelps | Dem. | Resigned |
| March 8, 2016 | 75th | Brandon Dillon | Dem. | David LaGrand | Dem. | Resigned |
| March 8, 2016 | 80th | Cindy Gamrat | Rep. | Mary Whiteford | Rep. | Expelled |
| March 8, 2016 | 82nd | Todd Courser | Rep. | Gary Howell | Rep. | Resigned |
| November 8, 2016 | 11th | Julie Plawecki | Dem. | Lauren Plawecki | Dem. | Death |
| November 8, 2016 | 28th | Derek E. Miller | Dem. | Patrick Green | Dem. | Resigned |
| November 7, 2017 | 1st | Brian Banks | Dem. | Tenisha Yancey | Dem. | Resigned |
| November 7, 2017 | 109th | John Kivela | Dem. | Sara Cambensy | Dem. | Death |
| November 6, 2018 | 68th | Andy Schor | Dem. | Sarah Anthony | Dem. | Resigned |
| March 10, 2020 | 34th | Sheldon Neeley | Dem. | Cynthia Neeley | Dem. | Resigned |
| November 3, 2020 | 4th | Isaac Robinson | Dem. | Abraham Aiyash | Dem. | Death |
| May 3, 2022 | 15th | Abdullah Hammoud | Dem. | Jeffrey Pepper | Dem. | Resigned |
| May 3, 2022 | 36th | Doug Wozniak | Rep. | Terence Mekoski | Rep. | Resigned |
| May 3, 2022 | 43rd | Andrea Schroeder | Rep. | Mike Harris | Rep. | Death |
| May 3, 2022 | 74th | Mark Huizenga | Rep. | Carol Glanville | Dem. | Resigned |
| April 16, 2024 | 13th | Lori Stone | Dem. | Mai Xiong | Dem. | Resigned |
| April 16, 2024 | 25th | Kevin Coleman | Dem. | Peter Herzberg | Dem. | Resigned |

== See also ==
- List of special elections to the Michigan Senate
