= Charles T. Kimball =

American politician

Charles T. Kimball (November 15, 1872 – February 18, 1949) was a Republican member of the Michigan House of Representatives. He was a native of Jonesville, and represented Hillsdale County in the legislature. He was a survivor of the Kerns Hotel fire in Lansing of December 11, 1934.
