= James Kirk (Michigan politician) =

American politician

Member of the Michigan House of Representatives from the Tuscola County district
- In office January 1, 1943 – December 31, 1950
- Preceded by: Audley Rawson
- Succeeded by: Allison Green

Tuscola County Sheriff
- In office 1931–1934

Personal details
- Born: July 30, 1879 Fairgrove Township, Michigan
- Died: January 5, 1957 (aged 77)
- Party: Republican
- Spouse: Jane

James Kirk (1879-1957) was a Republican member of the Michigan House of Representatives.

Born in Fairgrove Township, Kirk was supervisor of Juniata Township for 14 years, and was elected Tuscola County sheriff in 1930. In 1942, Kirk was elected to the Legislature where he served four terms. He was defeated in the Republican primary in 1950 by Allison Green.

Kirk's father William had served in the House in the early 1900s.
