= Maurice E. Post =

American politician (1881–1958)

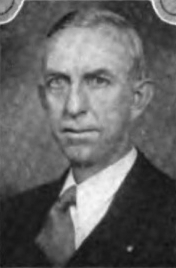
Michigan State Representative Maurice E. Post

Maurice E. Post (February 14, 1881 – March 30, 1958) was a Republican member of the Michigan House of Representatives. He was a farmer in Rockford and represented Kent County in the legislature from 1933 until 1948; he ran for the Michigan State Senate in 1948, but did not survive the primary. Post was an alternate delegate to the 1940 Republican National Convention. He was a survivor of the Kerns Hotel fire in Lansing of December 11, 1934.

Post was born on February 14, 1881, in Plainfield Township, Kent County, Michigan. He attended high school in Rockford, Michigan. He died on March 30, 1958, in Sarasota, Florida, where he had resided for five years.
