= Audley Rawson =

American politician

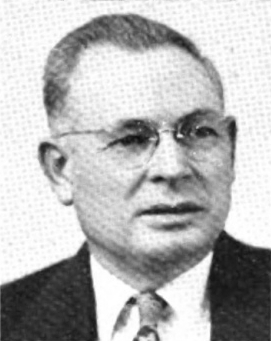

Member of the Michigan Senate from the 20th district
- In office January 1, 1943 – December 31, 1946
- Preceded by: Leonard J. Paterson
- Succeeded by: Edwin W. Klump

Member of the Michigan House of Representatives from the Tuscola County district
- In office January 1, 1935 – December 31, 1942
- Preceded by: D. Knox Hanna
- Succeeded by: James Kirk

Elkland Township Supervisor
- In office 1931–1936

Personal details
- Born: William Audley Rawson; April 5, 1893 Marlette, Michigan, US
- Died: September 27, 1981 (aged 88) Pinellas Park, Florida, US
- Party: Republican
- Spouse(s): Mary Lena Day (1914-1969); Mildred Hutchinson (1971-1981)
- Education: Michigan Agricultural College

William Audley Rawson was a Republican member of both houses of the Michigan Legislature, representing portions of the Thumb from 1935 through 1946.

Born near Marlette, Rawson was elected township supervisor of Elkland Township in 1930. He was elected to the Michigan House of Representatives for Tuscola County in 1934, where he served four terms. Rawson was then elected to the Michigan Senate where he served two terms.

After retiring from political office, Rawson was a lobbyist for the Michigan Association of Insurance Companies. He was an alternate delegate to the 1944 Republican National Convention, a member of the Michigan Republican State Committee, and chairman of the Tuscola County Republican Party.

In 1958, Rawson and his first wife Mary established the Rawson Foundation which continues to provide scholarships for graduates of Cass City High School. The trust fund also helped establish the Rawson Memorial Library in Cass City in 1970. Rawson was named Cass City Citizen of the Year in 1971.

Rawson died of a heart attack in Pinellas Park, Florida on September 27, 1981, aged 88.
