= Gerrit Beneker =

American painter and illustrator

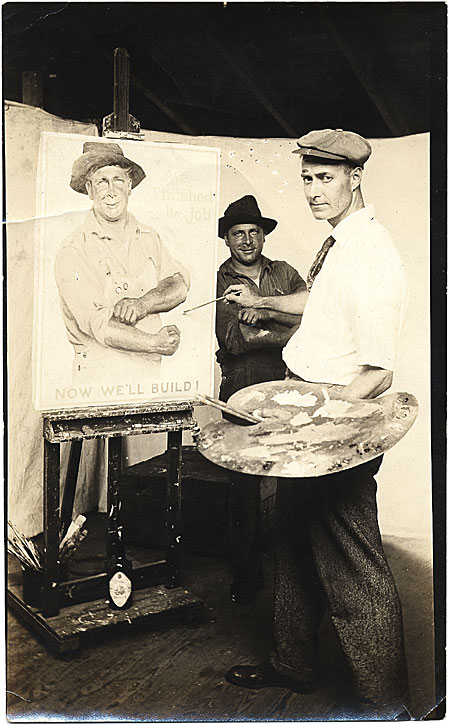
Gerrit Beneker at his easel in 1915

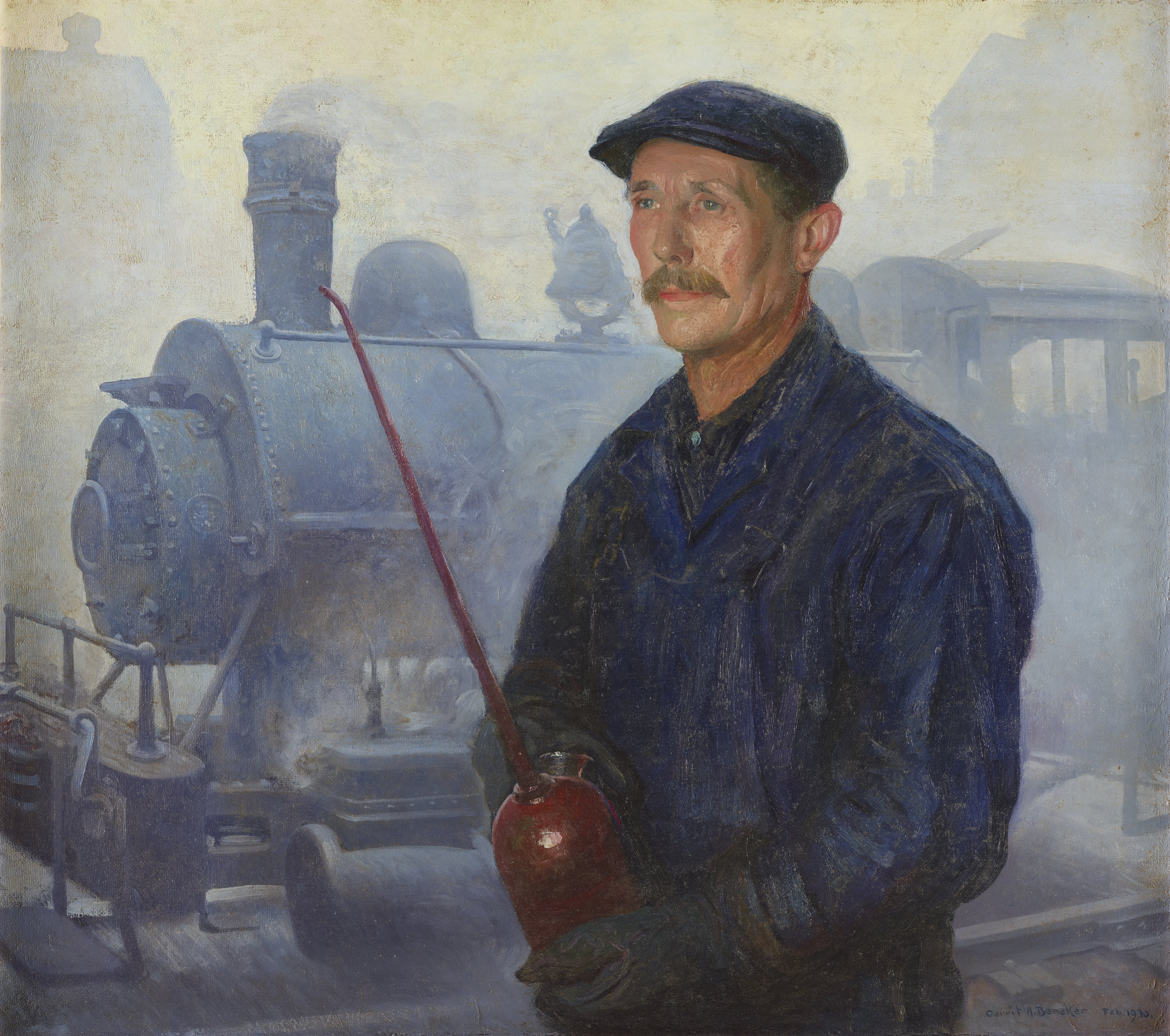
Portrait of Reinhart Geiger, locomotive engineer

Gerrit Albertus Beneker (January 26, 1882 – October 23, 1934) was an American painter and illustrator best known for his paintings of industrial scenes and for his poster work in World War I.

== Biography ==
Beneker was born on January 26, 1882, in Grand Rapids, Michigan, the son of Bartel Albertus Beneker, who had immigrated from Serooskerke in the Netherlands, and Pauline Catherine Steketee. He first studied at the Chicago Art Institute, where his teachers included John Vanderpoel and Frederick Richardson; later he transferred to the Art Students League in New York. In September 1907 he married Flora Judd Van Vranken from Marcellus, New York, with whom he would have four children.

After working as an illustrator in New York, he became a student of Charles Webster Hawthorne in 1912 at the Cape Cod School of Art; although his work brought about frequent moves, he returned to the area in the summers and in 1920 bought a summer house in Truro, Massachusetts.

In July 1918, Beneker was hired, under the title of "Expert Aid, Navy Department", to create posters and illustrations for the war effort. It was in this period that he painted his most familiar work, "Sure We'll Finish the Job", which sold over three million copies.

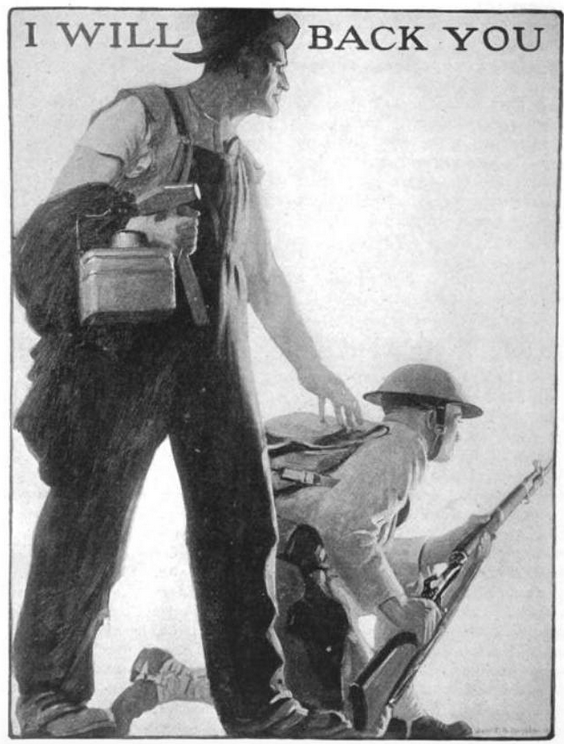
"I will back you"

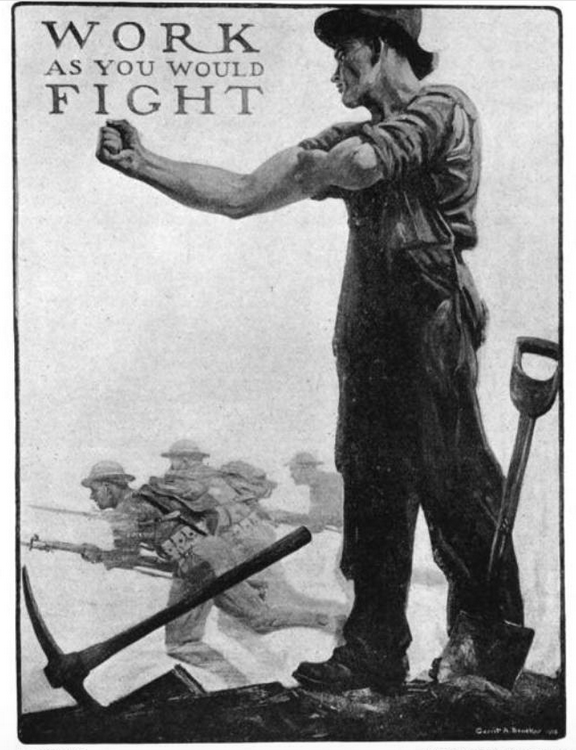
"Work as you would fight"

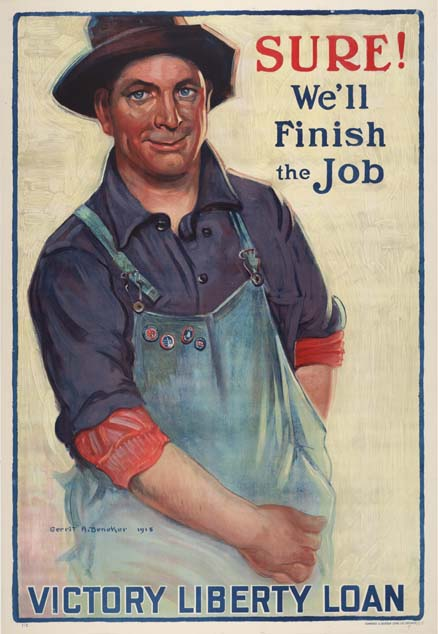
"Sure! We'll finish the job"

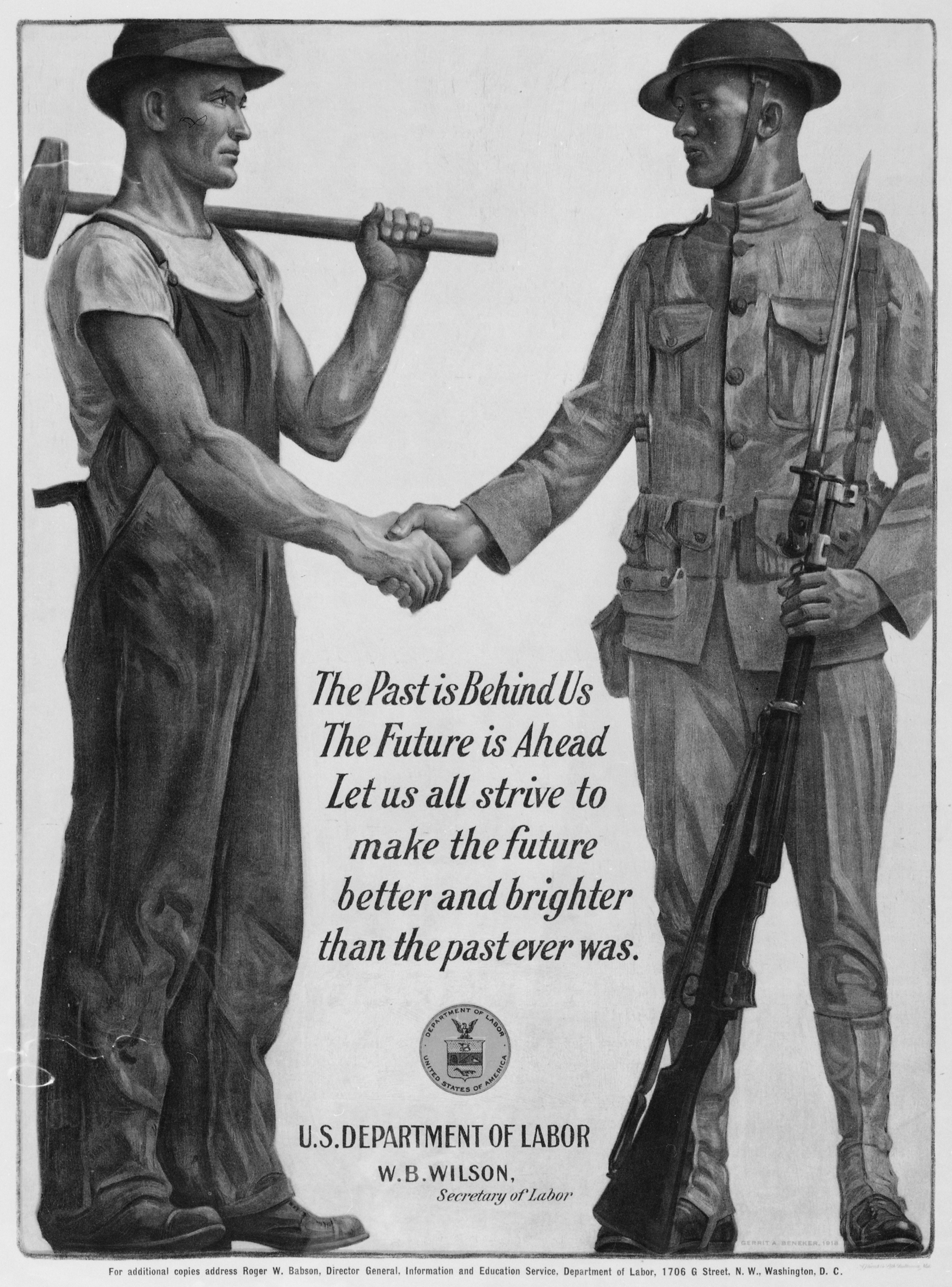
"The Past is Behind Us, The Future is Ahead. Let us all strive to make the future better and brighter than the past..."

Later Beneker spent four years painting workers of the Hydraulic Pressed Steel Company in Cleveland, Ohio, as part of a labor-management relations improvement project; similar projects were carried out at the General Electric plant in Schenectady, New York, and at the Rohm and Haas plant in Philadelphia.

He died on 23 October 1934 in Truro.

Beneker was one of the founders of the Provincetown Art Association and Museum. His papers are held by the Archives of American Art of the Smithsonian Institution.

== Analysis ==
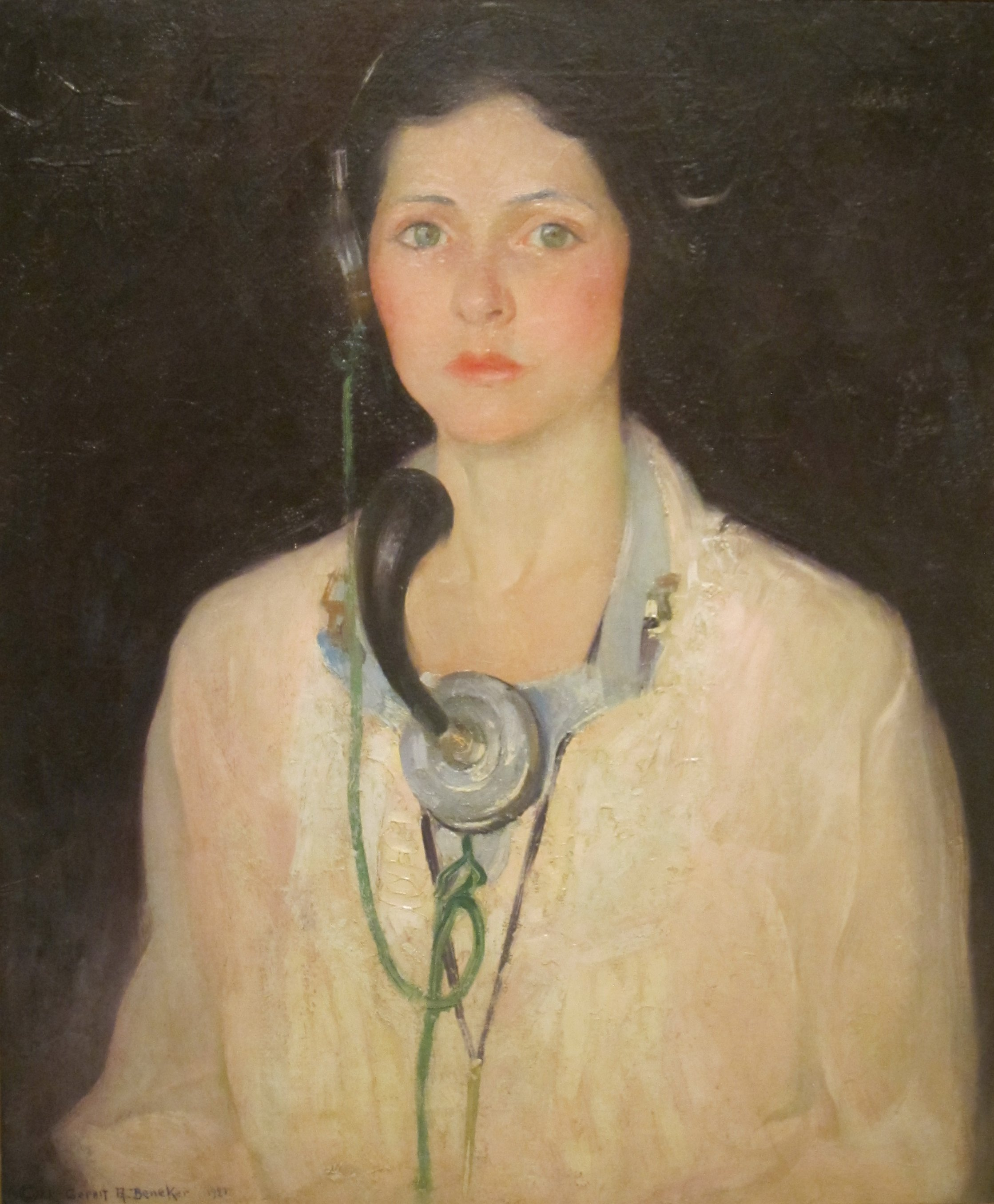
Telephone Operator (A Weaver of Public Thought), 1921

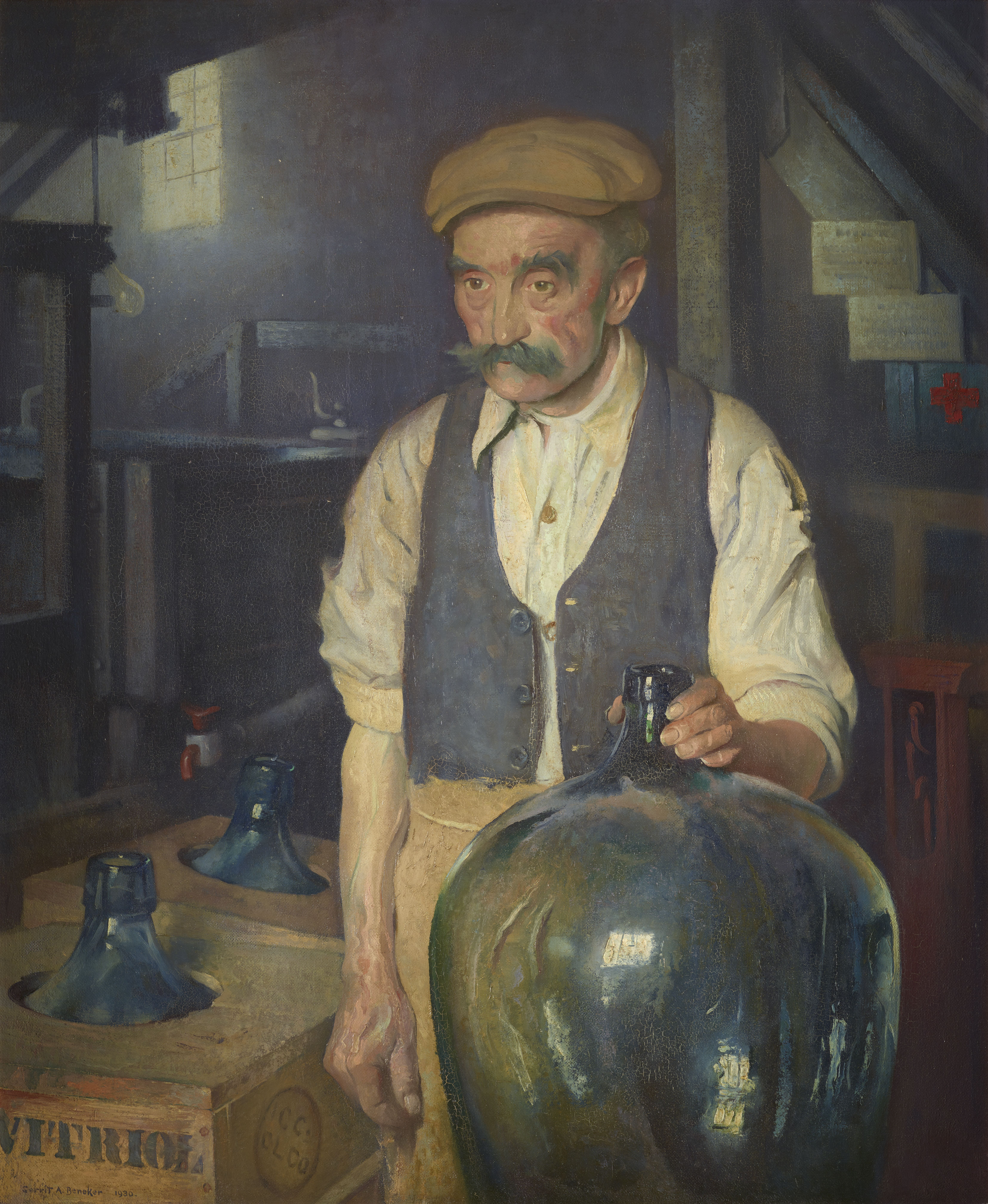
Portrait of George Trapp, blue-collar worker, 1930

Beneker's output was prodigious, with some five hundred works in oil produced over a thirty-year period, exclusive of his many illustrations. Most of his work consists of portraits, landscapes, and genre paintings of industrial and manual labor, and it is for the last that he is best known.

Beneker's industrial paintings are optimistic and uplift the common laborer. James Guimond lists him, along with such other artists as Alfred Stieglitz, Joseph Stella, and Margaret Bourke-White, as a participant in "a popular genre of industrial art that was a kind of sooty romanticism." His industrial paintings toured the country, and Beneker was in great demand as a lecturer.

While his portraiture and industrial works are conservatively realistic, his landscapes are noted for their impressionism.

In addition, Beneker's illustrations appeared in over eighty publications including Scientific American and Harper's Weekly. He was noted for his Ivory Soap advertisements.
