= Calvin Smith (Michigan politician) =

American politician in Michigan

Member-elect of the Michigan House of Representatives from the Washtenaw County district
- In office 1838
- Succeeded by: Nathan Pierce

Personal details
- Died: 1838
- Party: Whig

Calvin Smith (died 1838) was a Michigan politician and lawyer.

On July 29, 1827, Smith was a member of a Methodist reading class. In 1832, after being a law student of judge James Kingsley, Smith was admitted to the bar, becoming a lawyer. Smith then practiced law in Dexter, Michigan. In 1833, Smith served as justice of the peace. In 1838, Smith was elected to one of the Michigan House of Representatives seats representing the Washtenaw County district. He was a Whig. That same year, Smith died before the legislature convened and he would have been able to take office. His death was announced on January 7, 1839, in the Journal of the Michigan House of Representatives. On February 7, 1839, Nathan Pierce took the office that Smith was elected to.
