= Kerns Hotel fire =

1934 fire in Lansing, Michigan, U.S.

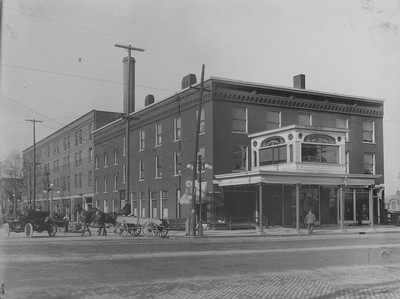
- Kerns Hotel in its early days, shown at left in the background. The three-story Hotel Wentworth shown in the foreground survived the fire.
- Date: December 11, 1934
- Location: Lansing, Michigan; 42°44′04″N 84°33′01″W
- Type: Fire
- Cause: Carelessly discarded cigarette
- Deaths: 34
- Injuries: 28 civilians; 14 firefighters

The Kerns Hotel fire of December 11, 1934, in Lansing, Michigan, United States, killed 34 people, including seven Michigan state legislators, and according to the Lansing Fire Department, was the worst fire disaster in the history of Lansing. The fire occurred around 5:30 am and spread rapidly through the building's wooden interior, trapping many of the hotel's 215 guests in their rooms and forcing them to escape via fire ladders or life nets. In addition to the fatalities, 42 more people, including fourteen firemen, were injured in the fire, which was thought to have been caused by a carelessly discarded cigarette.

== Background ==
The Kerns Hotel was located in the 100 block of N. Grand Ave. in Lansing, Michigan. It was built in 1909 by William G. Kerns as a four-story, 162-room hotel, constructed of brick with a wooden interior. The hotel cost $50,000 to build and was the first hotel in the state of Michigan to have running ice water in all of its rooms.

By 1934, the total number of rooms had been increased to 211. State legislators and community groups often stayed at the hotel because of its location and amenities, including a popular bar and restaurant. On the north end of the building there was a fire escape, but not on the south side, as the hotel was connected to the Hotel Wentworth there. The east side of the building was bordered by the Grand River.

== Fire ==
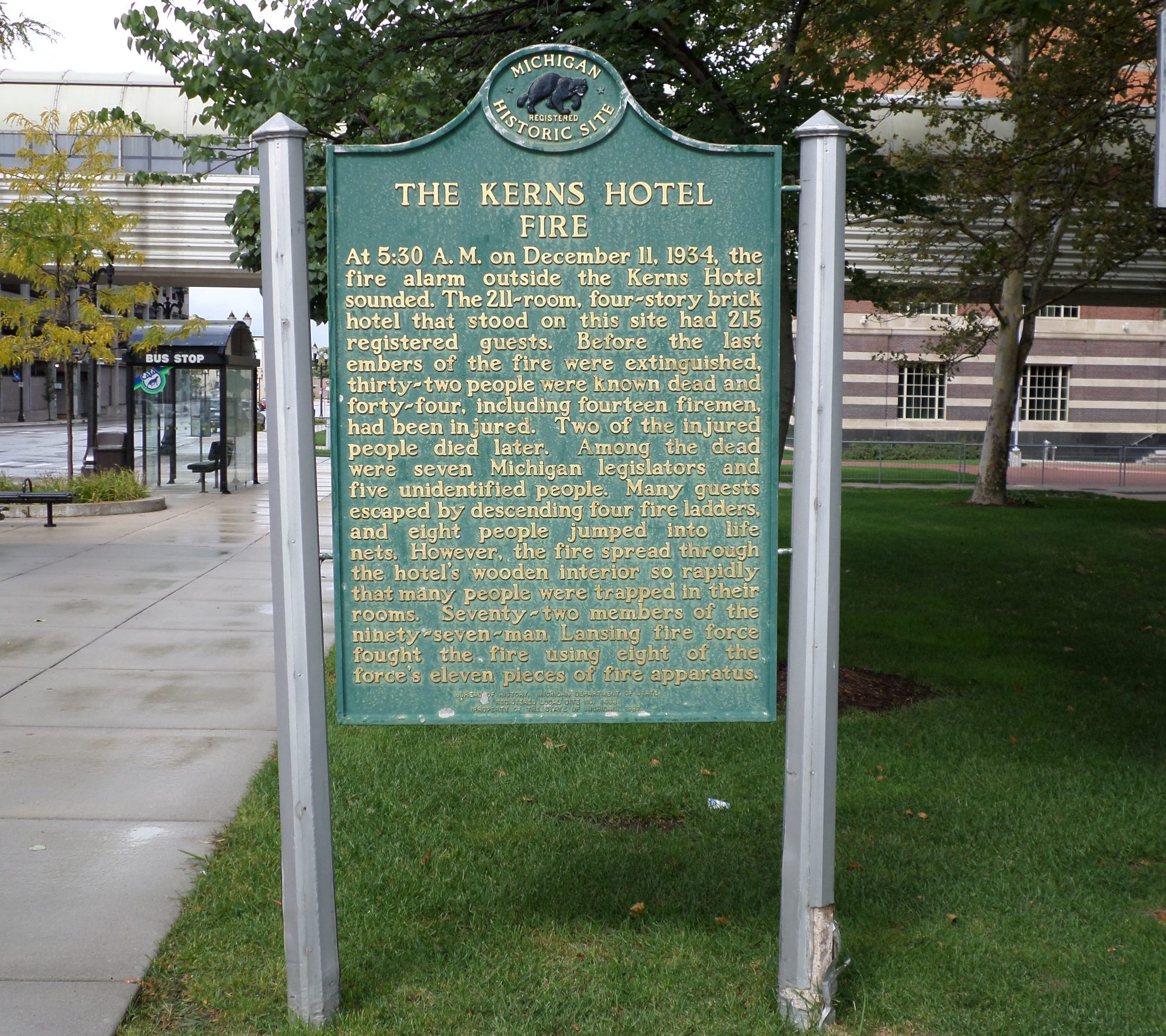
A plaque in downtown Lansing commemorating the fire

On December 11, 1934, a fire broke out in the Kerns Hotel killing 32 people and injuring 44, including 14 firemen. A night janitor from the newspaper across the street reportedly noticed the fire on a second floor window curtain and reported the fire to the Central fire station. The alarm bell sounded at 5:30 am in the 211-room four-story brick hotel. Many of the hotel's 215 guests escaped by utilizing one of the four fire ladders or utilized the life nets, but due to the wooden interior many guests were trapped in their rooms, and eight people leapt out of the hotel onto nets. Others fell into the Grand River trying to escape the flames and many spectators claim to have not seen them resurface.

At least one fireman was injured by a guest who jumped from the hotel, and the fire was contained by about 7:30 am.

=== Victims ===
Thirty-two people were initially killed by the fire with at least five bodies never identified. Forty-four people were injured including fourteen firefighters, two of the injured people died later, bringing the death toll to thirty-four.

Among the dead were seven Michigan state legislators, state senator John Leidlein and state representatives T. Henry Howlett, Charles D. Parker, Vern Voorhees, John W. Goodwine, Don E. Sias, and D. Knox Hanna, who were in town for a special session of the Michigan legislature. A number of other legislators were injured but survived, including Maurice E. Post, Charles T. Kimball, and John Dykstra.

== Aftermath ==
Firefighters and evacuated guests were aided by the Lansing and Michigan State Police, the Red Cross, the Salvation Army, the Volunteers of America and provided citizens with clothing and food, as well as monetary support. There are two historical markers in Michigan dedicated to the event and the responders.

The fire was widely covered by media, including appearing as the front page lead story in The New York Times and in the Illustrated London News. A memorial song, "The Lansing Hotel Fire", was written and published in 1935 by Walter Coon of Royal Oak, Michigan. The surrounding area and surviving buildings connected to the hotel are rumored to be haunted, with the sites included in ghost stories and tours of the area.
