= John Leidlein =

American politician

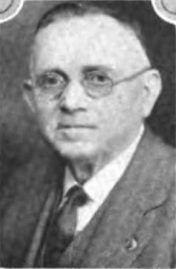

Member of the Michigan Senate from the 22nd district
- In office 1933 – December 11, 1934
- Preceded by: Chester M. Howell
- Succeeded by: Dale D. Doyle
- In office 1911–1912
- Preceded by: Joseph H. Whitney
- Succeeded by: G. Leo Weadock
- In office 1899–1900
- Preceded by: Henry M. Youmans
- Succeeded by: John Baird

Personal details
- Born: September 3, 1864 Buena Vista Township, Michigan
- Died: December 11, 1934 (aged 70) Lansing, Michigan (Kerns Hotel fire)
- Resting place: Forest Lawn Cemetery, Saginaw, Michigan
- Party: Democrat
- Spouse: Anna

John Leidlein (1864–1934) was a member of the Michigan State Senate. He was one of those killed in the Kerns Hotel fire in Lansing on December 11, 1934. Also killed were state representatives Charles D. Parker, Vern Voorhees, T. Henry Howlett, John W. Goodwine, D. Knox Hanna, and Don E. Sias. The men were in Lansing for a special session of the Michigan legislature.
