= T. Henry Howlett =

American politician

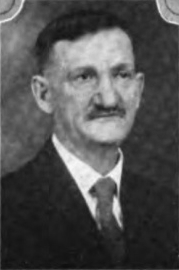

Member of the Michigan House of Representatives from the Livingston County district
- In office January 1, 1933 – December 11, 1934

Personal details
- Born: 1870
- Died: December 11, 1934 (aged 64) Kerns Hotel, Lansing, Michigan

T. Henry Howlett was a member of the Michigan House of Representatives from Gregory, Michigan who was one of six members of the state House killed in the Kerns Hotel fire in Lansing on December 11, 1934. Also killed were representatives Charles D. Parker, Vern Voorhees, John W. Goodwine, Don E. Sias, and D. Knox Hanna, along with state senator John Leidlein. The men were in Lansing for a special session of the Michigan legislature.
