= D. Knox Hanna =

American politician

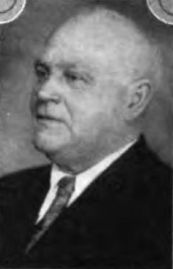

Member of the Michigan House of Representatives from the Tuscola County district
- In office January 1, 1933 – December 13, 1934
- Succeeded by: Audley Rawson

Personal details
- Died: December 13, 1934 Kerns Hotel, Lansing, Michigan

D. Knox Hanna was a member of the Michigan House of Representatives. He was one of six members of the state House killed in the Kerns Hotel fire in Lansing on December 11, 1934. Also killed were representatives Charles D. Parker, T. Henry Howlett, Vern Voorhees, John W. Goodwine, and Don E. Sias, along with state senator John Leidlein. The men were in Lansing for a special session of the Michigan legislature.
