= John W. Goodwine =

American politician

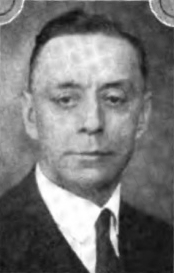

Member of the Michigan House of Representatives from the Sanilac County district
- In office January 1, 1927 – December 11, 1934
- Preceded by: Philip O'Connell
- Succeeded by: Alpheus P. Decker

Personal details
- Born: 1879
- Died: December 11, 1934 (aged 54–55) Lansing, Michigan (Kerns Hotel fire)
- Party: Republican

John W. Goodwine (1879-1934) was a member of the Michigan House of Representatives. He was one of six members of the state House killed in the Kerns Hotel fire in Lansing on December 11, 1934. Also killed were representatives Charles D. Parker, T. Henry Howlett, Vern Voorhees, Don E. Sias, and D. Knox Hanna, along with state senator John Leidlein. The men were in Lansing for a special session of the Michigan legislature.
