= Charles Parker (Michigan politician) =

American politician (1877–1934)

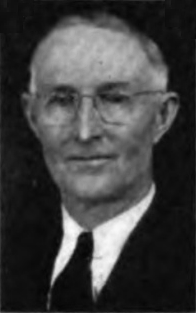

Member of the Michigan House of Representatives from the Genesee County 2nd district
- In office January 1, 1933 – December 11, 1934
- Preceded by: Charles H. Reed
- Succeeded by: Maurice R. Matthews

Personal details
- Born: 1877
- Died: December 11, 1934 (aged 56–57) Kerns Hotel, Lansing, Michigan

Charles Parker (1877-1934) was a member of the Michigan House of Representatives. He was one of six members of the state House killed in the Kerns Hotel fire in Lansing on December 11, 1934. Also killed were representatives D. Knox Hanna, T. Henry Howlett, Vern Voorhees, John W. Goodwine, and Don E. Sias, along with state senator John Leidlein. The men were in Lansing for a special session of the Michigan legislature.
