= Don E. Sias =

American politician (1894–1934)

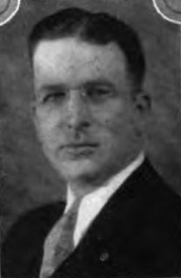

Member of the Michigan House of Representatives from the Midland County district
- In office 1931 – December 11, 1934
- Succeeded by: Aaron T. Bliss Sr.

Personal details
- Born: December 27, 1894 Midland, Michigan
- Died: December 11, 1934 (aged 39) Lansing, Michigan (Kerns Hotel fire)
- Party: Republican

Donald E. Sias (December 27, 1894 - December 11, 1934) was a member of the Michigan House of Representatives. He was one of six members of the state House killed in the Kerns Hotel fire in Lansing on December 11, 1934. Also killed were representatives Charles D. Parker, Vern Voorhees, T. Henry Howlett, John W. Goodwine, and D. Knox Hanna, along with state senator John Leidlein. The men were in Lansing for a special session of the Michigan legislature.
