= 2026 Michigan Senate election =

- November 3, 2026

All 38 seats in the Michigan Senate 20 seats needed for a majority

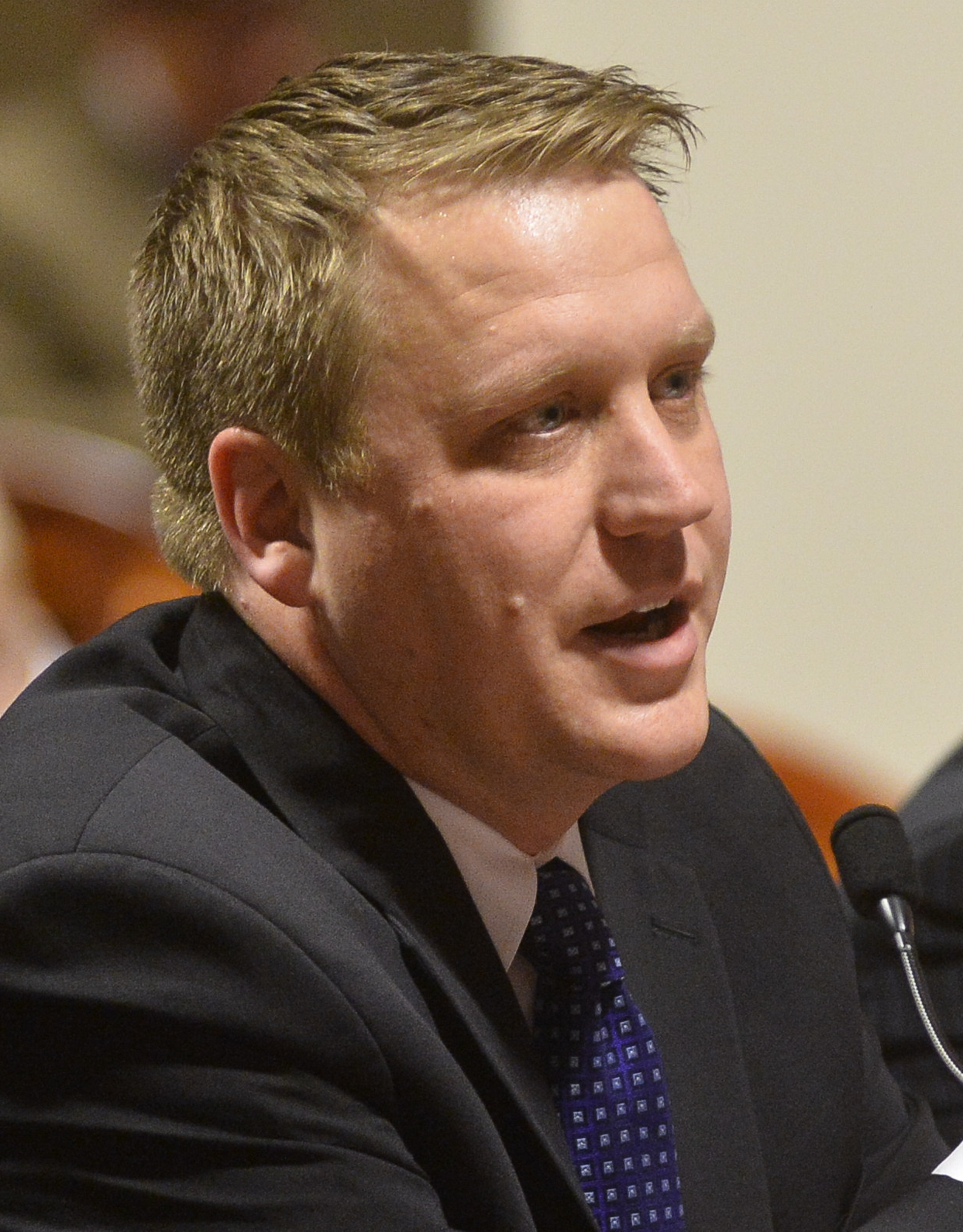
	Majority party	Minority party
Leader	Winnie Brinks (term-limited)	Aric Nesbitt (term-limited)
Party	Democratic	Republican
Leader since	January 1, 2023	January 11, 2023
Leader's seat	29th–Grand Rapids	20th–Porter
Last election	20 seats, 50.41%	18 seats, 48.75%
Seats before	20	18
Seats after	23	15
Seat change	▲3	▼3
- Results: Democratic hold Democratic gain Republican hold
Majority Leader before election
Winnie Brinks
Democratic
Elected Majority Leader
TBD

The 2026 Michigan Senate election took place on November 3, 2026, to elect all 38 members to the Michigan Senate. The election coincided with elections for all of Michigan's constitutional offices: governor, attorney general, secretary of state, and all 110 seats in the Michigan House of Representatives. Seats in the Michigan Senate were last elected in 2022.

== Predictions ==
Source	Ranking	As of
Sabato's Crystal Ball	Tossup	January 22, 2026
State Navigate	Lean D	August 27, 2026

== Background ==
Districts in yellow were redrawn prior to the 2026 election

Under the Michigan Constitution, state representatives and senators are limited to twelve years combined in either chamber of the legislature, after voters approved on November 8, 2022, a constitutional amendment that revised term limits. Michigan has what are considered the toughest term limits in the country.

In the previous election, Democrats gained four seats, winning control of the chamber for the first time since 1984.

In 2023, several districts in the metro Detroit area were struck down as unconstitutional and the redistricting panel was ordered to draw new maps that could be used. A final map was chosen in July 2024 and new district lines were in effect for the 2026 elections.

== Outgoing incumbents ==
Status of incumbents heading into the election: Democratic incumbent renominated Democratic incumbent retiring or term-limited Republican incumbent renominated Republican incumbent retiring or term-limited

=== Term-limited ===
In total, 8 Democrats and 10 Republicans are term-limited.

- Erika Geiss (D–Taylor), representing district 1 since 2022, (Note: Previously represented the 6th district 2019–2023) is term-limited.
- Sylvia Santana (D–Detroit), representing district 2 since 2022, (Note: Previously represented the 3rd district 2019–2023) is term-limited and ran for Michigan State University Board of Trustees.
- Stephanie Chang (D–Detroit), representing district 3 since 2022, (Note: Previously represented the 1st district 2019–2023) is term-limited.
- Jeremy Moss (D–Southfield), representing district 7 since 2022, (Note: Previously represented the 11th district 2019–2023) is term-limited and ran for U.S. Congress.
- Paul Wojno (D–Warren), representing district 10 since 2022, (Note: Previously represented the 9th district 2019–2023) is term-limited.
- Jeff Irwin (D–Ann Arbor), representing district 15 since 2022, (Note: Previously represented the 18th district 2019–2023) is term-limited.
- Sean McCann (D–Kalamazoo), representing district 19 since 2022, (Note: Previously represented the 20th district 2019–2023) is term-limited and ran for U.S. Congress.
- Aric Nesbitt (R–Porter Township), representing district 20 since 2022, (Note: Previously represented the 26th district 2019–2023) is term-limited.
- Lana Theis (R–Brighton Township), representing district 22 since 2018, is term-limited.
- Jim Runestad (R–White Lake Township), representing district 23 since 2022, (Note: Previously represented the 15th district 2019–2023) is term-limited.
- Ruth Johnson (R–Holly), representing district 24 since 2022, (Note: Previously represented the 14th district 2019–2023) is term-limited.
- Dan Lauwers (R–Capac), representing district 25 since 2018, is term-limited.
- Kevin Daley (R–Lum), representing district 26 since 2022, (Note: Previously represented the 31st district 2019–2023) is term-limited.
- Winnie Brinks (D–Grand Rapids), representing district 29 since 2018, is term-limited and ran for lieutenant governor.
- Roger Victory (R–Hudsonville), representing district 31 since 2022, (Note: Previously represented the 30th district 2019–2023) is term-limited and ran for Michigan State University Board of Trustees.
- Jon Bumstead (R–Newaygo), representing district 32 since 2022, (Note: Previously represented the 34th district 2019–2023) is term-limited.
- Rick Outman (R–Six Lakes), representing district 33 since 2018, is term-limited.
- Ed McBroom (R–Vulcan), representing district 38 since 2018, is term-limited.

=== Retiring ===
- Rosemary Bayer (D–West Bloomfield), representing district 13 since 2022, (Note: Previously represented the 12th district 2019–2023) retired.
- Mallory McMorrow (D–Royal Oak), representing district 8 since 2022, (Note: Previously represented the 13th district 2019–2023) retired and ran for U.S. Senate.
- Sam Singh (D–East Lansing), representing district 28 since 2022, retired.

== Incumbents defeated ==
=== In general election ===
Two Republicans lost re-election.

==== Republicans ====
1. 9th district: Michael Webber lost re-election to Theresa Brooks
2. 30th district: Mark Huizenga lost re-election to Carol Glanville

== Special election ==
=== District 35 ===
Following the resignation of Kristen McDonald Rivet, who resigned to take a seat in the United States House of Representatives, a special election took place to fill the vacancy. Primary elections took place on February 3, 2026, and the general election took place on May 5, 2026. Democratic governor Gretchen Whitmer was criticized for the long delay between Rivet's resignation and the calling of the special election, which left the seat vacant for over a year. This election was considered important because if Republicans won the general election, then the Michigan Senate would have become tied.

Six Democrats ran in their primary, with Pamela Pugh and Chedrick Greene considered to be the frontrunners. Pugh, the president of the Michigan Board of Education, was considered to be the more progressive candidate and had the backing of U.S. Representative Rashida Tlaib and multiple state legislators. Greene, a Saginaw fire captain, had the backing of numerous labor unions and Kristen McDonald Rivet, the district's most recent senator. Greene won the primary by 33%. Four Republicans ran for their nomination, with attorney Jason Tunney and businessman Christian Velasquez emerging as the frontrunners. Tunney went on to win the primary by 9%.

Democratic primary details

==== Nominee ====
- Chedrick Greene, Saginaw fire captain

==== Eliminated in primary ====
- Brandell Adams, chair of the Saginaw County Democrats and former Bridgeport Township trustee
- Martin Blank, trauma surgeon and Republican candidate for Michigan's 8th congressional district in 2024
- William Morrone, medical examiner
- Pamela Pugh, president of the Michigan State Board of Education and candidate for Michigan's 8th congressional district in 2024
- Serenity Hope Salak, substitute teacher

==== Endorsements ====
Chedrick Greene

Executive branch officials

- Eric Holder, former United States attorney general (2009–2015) (post-primary)

U.S representatives

- Kristen McDonald Rivet, MI-8 (2025–present)

Statewide officials

- Gretchen Whitmer, governor of Michigan (2019–present) (post-primary)

State legislators

- Amos O'Neal, HD-94 (2021–present)

Local officials

- Carol Cottrell, former mayor of Saginaw (2005–2007)
- Christopher Girard, mayor of Bay City (2025–present)
- Weston Prince, Bay County Treasurer (2022–present)

Labor unions

- International Brotherhood of Electrical Workers Michigan
- International Brotherhood of Teamsters Local 406
- International Union of Painters and Allied Trades (post primary)
- Laborers' International Union of North America Local 1098
- Michigan AFL-CIO
- Michigan Association of Police Organizations (post primary)
- Michigan Nurses Association (post primary)
- Michigan Professional Fire Fighters Union
- National Association of Social Workers-Michigan (post primary)
- United Association Local 85
- United Food and Commercial Workers Locals 876 and 951

Organizations

- Giffords
- Michigan Association for Justice
- Michigan Democratic Party LGBT&A Caucus
- VoteVets
Brandell Adams

Local officials

- John McColgan, Sawinaw County prosecutor (2013–present)
- Lisa Ingram, Saginaw Township clerk (2024–present)
William Marrone

Individuals

- Nancy Grace, former news anchor at HLN
Pamela Pugh

State legislators

- Emily Dievendorf, HD-77 (2023–present)
- Sylvia Santana, SD-02 (2019–present)
- Dylan Wegela, HD-26 (2023–present)
- Regina Weiss, HD-5 (2021–present)
- Jimmie Wilson Jr., HD-32 (2023–present)

Local officials

- Gary L. Loster, former mayor of Saginaw (1993–2001)
- Joyce Seals, former mayor of Saginaw (2007–2009

Organizations

- 314 Action
- Michigan Democratic Party Progressive Caucus
- Michigan Working Families Party

Republican primary details

==== Nominee ====
- Jason Tunney, attorney

==== Eliminated in primary ====
- Chadwick Twillman, businessman
- Christian Velasquez, businessman
- Andrew Wendt, former Saginaw city councilor

==== Declined ====
- Bill G. Schuette, state representative from the 95th district (2023–present) (running for re-election)

==== Endorsements ====
Jason Tunney

Statewide officials

- Mike Cox, former Michigan attorney general (2003–2011) and candidate for governor in 2010 (post-primary)

Organizations

- NFIB (post-primary)
Christian Velasquez

U.S. representatives

- Dave Camp, former MI-4 (1991–2015)

State legislators

- Kevin Daley, SD-26 (2019–present)
- 5 former state senators

Democratic primary results
Party	Candidate	Votes	%
Democratic	Chedrick Greene	16,085	60.40
Democratic	Pamela Pugh	7,373	27.69
Democratic	Martin Blank	1,188	4.46
Democratic	Serenity Hope Salak	712	2.67
Democratic	Brandell Adams	674	2.53
Democratic	William Morrone	599	2.25
Total votes		26,631	100.0

Republican primary results
Party	Candidate	Votes	%
Republican	Jason Tunney	9,335	51.20
Republican	Christian Velasquez	7,735	42.43
Republican	Chadwick Twillman	690	3.78
Republican	Andrew Wendt	472	2.59
Total votes		18,232	100.0

General election results
Party	Candidate	Votes	%
Democratic	Chedrick Greene	36,583	58.88
Republican	Jason Tunney	24,491	39.42
Libertarian	Ali Sledz	1,058	1.70
Total votes		62,132	100.0
Democratic hold			

== Results summary ==
Italics denote an open seat held by the incumbent party; bold text denotes a gain for a party.

† - Incumbent not seeking re-election or term-limited

District	2024 Pres.	Incumbent	Party	Elected senator	Outcome
1st	D+51.8	Erika Geiss†	Dem	Justin Onwenu	Dem Hold
2nd	R+2.5	Sylvia Santana†	Dem	Abbas Alawieh	Dem Hold
3rd	D+76.8	Stephanie Chang†	Dem	John Conyers III	Dem Hold
4th	D+0.1	Darrin Camilleri	Dem	Darrin Camilleri	Dem Hold
5th	D+14.9	None (open seat)		Matt Koleszar	Dem Hold
6th	D+77.7	Mary Cavanagh	Dem	Mary Cavanagh	Dem Hold
7th	D+36.2	Jeremy Moss†	Dem	Jason Hoskins	Dem Hold
8th	D+11.6	Mallory McMorrow† (Note: Redistricted into the 10th district)	Dem	Dayna Polehanki	Dem Hold
8th	D+11.6	Dayna Polehanki (Note: Redistricted from the 5th district)	Dem	Dayna Polehanki	Dem Hold
9th	R+5.1	Michael Webber	Rep	**Theresa Brooks**	**Dem Gain**
10th	D+30.5	Paul Wojno†	Dem	Natalie Price	Dem Hold
11th	D+3.2	Veronica Klinefelt	Dem	Veronica Klinefelt	Dem Hold
12th	R+7.2	Kevin Hertel	Dem	Kevin Hertel	Dem Hold
13th	R+1.7	Rosemary Bayer†	Dem	Sean Carlson	Dem Hold
14th	D+9.7	Sue Shink	Dem	Sue Shink	Dem Hold
15th	D+43.0	Jeff Irwin†	Dem	Felicia Brabec	Dem Hold
16th	R+30.0	Joe Bellino	Rep	Joe Bellino	Rep Hold
17th	R+30.0	Jonathan Lindsey	Rep	Jonathan Lindsey	Rep Hold
18th	R+23.7	Thomas Albert	Rep	Thomas Albert	Rep Hold
19th	D+17.1	Sean McCann†	Dem	Julie Rogers	Dem Hold
20th	R+16.5	Aric Nesbitt†	Rep	Chris Moraitis	Rep Hold
21st	D+12.3	Sarah Anthony	Dem	Sarah Anthony	Dem Hold
22nd	R+24.0	Lana Theis†	Rep	Mike Murphy	Rep Hold
23rd	R+23.1	Jim Runestad†	Rep	Donni Steele	Rep Hold
24th	R+27.5	Ruth Johnson†	Rep	Doug Wozniak	Rep Hold
25th	R+37.3	Dan Lauwers†	Rep	Andrew Beeler	Rep Hold
26th	R+27.4	Kevin Daley†	Rep	Matthew Bierlein	Rep Hold
27th	D+18.5	John Daniel Cherry	Dem	John Daniel Cherry	Dem Hold
28th	D+9.5	Sam Singh†	Dem	Rashida Harrison	Dem Hold
29th	D+25.9	Winnie Brinks†	Dem	Abbie Groff-Blaszak	Dem Hold
30th	D+4.5	Mark Huizenga	Rep	**Carol Glanville**	**Dem Gain**
31st	R+18.6	Roger Victory†	Rep	John Wetzel	Rep Hold
32nd	R+6.9	Jon Bumstead†	Rep	**Rebecca Amidon**	**Dem Gain**
33rd	R+34.7	Rick Outman†	Rep	Gina Johnsen	Rep Hold
34th	R+31.0	Roger Hauck	Rep	Roger Hauck	Rep Hold
35th	D+0.9	Chedrick Greene	Dem	Chedrick Greene	Dem Hold
36th	R+36.8	Michele Hoitenga	Rep	Michele Hoitenga	Rep Hold
37th	R+10.7	John Damoose	Rep	John Damoose	Rep Hold
38th	R+18.1	Ed McBroom†	Rep	David Prestin	Rep Hold

== District 1 ==
The incumbent Democrat Erika Geiss, who was re-elected with 71.57% of the vote in 2022, was term-limited.

=== Democratic primary ===
==== Nominee ====
- Justin Onwenu, Detroit director of Entrepreneurship and Economic Opportunity

==== Eliminated in primary ====
- Abraham Aiyash, former majority leader of the Michigan House of Representatives (2023–2025) from the 9th district (2020–2024)

==== Endorsements ====
Abraham Aiyash

U.S. representatives

- Rashida Tlaib, MI-12 (2019–present)

State legislators

- Stephanie Young, HD-16 (2021–present)

Labor unions

- American Federation of Teachers
- International Brotherhood of Electrical Workers Local 58
- LiUNA Local 1191
- Michigan Education Association
- Michigan Nurses Association
- Michigan Professional Fire Fighters Union
- UNITE HERE Local 24

Organizations

- Council on American-Islamic Relations
- Michigan Democratic Party Progressive Caucus
- Emgage Action
Justin Onwenu

U.S. senators

- Bernie Sanders, Vermont (2007–present) (Independent) (post-primary)

U.S. representatives

- Andy Levin, MI-9 (2019–2023)

State legislators

- Tyrone Carter, HD-1 (2019–present)
- Helena Scott, HD-8 (2021–present)
- Joe Tate, HD-9 (2019–present)

Local officials

- Warren Evans, Wayne County executive (2015–present)
- Mary Sheffield, mayor of Detroit (2026–present)

Labor unions

- Michigan AFL-CIO (post-primary)

Organizations

- Michigan Democratic Party Black Caucus
- Run for Something

Newspapers

- Detroit Free Press (post-primary)
- Michigan Chronicle

==== Results ====
Democratic primary results
Party	Candidate	Votes	%
Democratic	Justin Onwenu	18,928	58.67
Democratic	Abraham Aiyash	13,336	41.33
Total votes		32,264	100.0

=== Republican primary ===
==== Nominee ====
- Patrick O'Connell

==== Results ====
Republican primary results
Party	Candidate	Votes	%
Republican	Patrick O'Connell	4,060	100
Total votes		4,060	100.0

=== General election ===
==== Results ====
2026 Michigan's 1st Senate district election results
Party	Candidate	Votes	%
Democratic	Justin Onwenu	67,761	83.33
Republican	Patrick O'Connell	13,560	16.67
Total votes		81,321	100.0
Democratic hold			

== District 2 ==
The incumbent Democrat Sylvia Santana, who was re-elected with 67.99% of the vote in 2022, was term-limited and ran for the Michigan State University Board of Trustees.

=== Democratic primary ===
==== Nominee ====
- Abbas Alawieh, co-founder of the Uncommitted Movement and former chief of staff to Cori Bush

==== Eliminated in primary ====
- Erin Byrnes, state representative from the 15th district (2023–present)

==== Endorsements ====
Abbas Alawieh

U.S. senators

- Bernie Sanders, Vermont (2007–present) (Independent)

Statewide officials

- Gretchen Whitmer, governor of Michigan (2019–present)

Local officials

- Warren Evans, Wayne County executive (2015–present)

Labor unions

- Michigan AFL-CIO (post-primary)

Organizations

- Michigan Democratic Party Progressive Caucus
- Reproductive Freedom for All (post-primary)

Newspapers

- Detroit Free Press (post-primary)

==== Results ====
Democratic primary results
Party	Candidate	Votes	%
Democratic	Abbas Alawieh	23,734	58.88
Democratic	Erin Byrnes	16,578	41.12
Total votes		40,312	100.0

=== Republican primary ===
==== Nominee ====
- Harry Sawicki

==== Results ====
Republican primary results
Party	Candidate	Votes	%
Republican	Harry Sawicki	9,068	100
Total votes		9,068	100.0

=== General election ===
==== Results ====
2026 Michigan's 2nd Senate district election results
Party	Candidate	Votes	%
Democratic	Abbas Alawieh	72,358	70.68
Republican	Harry Sawicki	27,265	26.64
Working Class	Larry Betts	2,744	2.68
Total votes		102,367	100.0
Democratic hold			

== District 3 ==
The incumbent Democrat Stephanie Chang, who was re-elected with 85.67% of the vote in 2022, was term-limited.

=== Democratic primary ===
==== Nominee ====
- John Conyers III, hedge fund manager, candidate for Michigan's 13th congressional district in 2018's special and regular elections, and son of former U.S. representative John Conyers

==== Eliminated in primary ====
- Mohammed Alam
- LeJuan Council
- LaTanya Garrett, former state representative from the 7th district (2015–2021)
- Korey Hall, Michigan director of Community Affairs
- Kimberly Hill Knott
- Adam Hollier, former state senator from the 2nd district (2018–2022) and candidate for Michigan's 13th congressional district in 2022 and 2024 (previously ran for congress and secretary of state)
- Gary Hunter
- Toinu Reeves
- Abraham Shaw
- Eboni Taylor, vice-president of Programs at Higher Heights for America PAC

==== Withdrawn ====
- Bobby Christian, activist and organizer
- Theodore Jones
- Rachel Udabe

==== Endorsements ====
John Conyers III

Labor unions

- Michigan AFL-CIO (post-primary)
Korey Hall

Statewide officials

- Gretchen Whitmer, governor of Michigan (2019–present)

State legislators

- Amos O'Neal, HD-94 (2021–present)

Local officials

- Warren Evans, Wayne County executive (2015–present)

Individuals

- Horace Sheffield III, pastor and talk show host

Labor unions

- Michigan Regional Council of Carpenters and Millwrights
- International Brotherhood of Teamsters Local 214

Newspapers

- Michigan Chronicle
Adam Hollier

State legislators

- Brian Banks, HD-1 (2013–2017)
- LaMar Lemmons III, HD-3 (1999–2003, 2005–2007)
- Harvey Santana, HD-9 (2011–2016)
Eboni Taylor

U.S. senators

- Bernie Sanders, Vermont (2007–present) (Independent)

U.S. representatives

- Rashida Tlaib, MI-12 (2019–present)

State legislators

- Stephanie Chang, incumbent state senator (2019–present)

Local officials

- Adam Alharbi, mayor of Hamtramck (2026–present)

==== Results ====
Democratic primary results
Party	Candidate	Votes	%
Democratic	John Conyers III	9,426	24.40
Democratic	Adam Hollier	7,488	19.39
Democratic	Eboni Taylor	7,248	18.76
Democratic	Korey Hall	4,225	10.94
Democratic	LaTanya Garrett	2,829	7.32
Democratic	Mohammad Alam	2,179	5.64
Democratic	Toinu Reeves	1,998	5.17
Democratic	Kimberly Hill Knott	1,734	4.49
Democratic	Abraham Shaw	517	1.34
Democratic	Gary Hunter	494	1.28
Democratic	LeJuan Council	489	1.27
Total votes		38,627	100.0

=== Republican primary ===
==== Nominee ====
- Mark Ashley Price

==== Results ====
Republican primary results
Party	Candidate	Votes	%
Republican	Mark Ashley Price	989	100
Total votes		989	100.0

=== General election ===
==== Results ====
2026 Michigan's 3rd Senate district election results
Party	Candidate	Votes	%
Democratic	John Conyers III	77,316	93.10
Republican	Mark Ashley Price	3,474	4.18
Working Class	David Roehrig	2,262	2.72
Total votes		83,052	100.0
Democratic hold			

== District 4 ==
The incumbent Democrat Darrin Camilleri, who was elected with 55.34% of the vote in 2022, ran for re-election.

=== Democratic primary ===
==== Nominee ====
- Darrin Camilleri, incumbent state senator (2023–present)

==== Endorsements ====
Darrin Camilleri

Organizations

- Latino Victory Fund
- Reproductive Freedom for All (post-primary)

Newspapers

- Detroit Free Press (post-primary)

==== Results ====
Democratic primary results
Party	Candidate	Votes	%
Democratic	Darrin Camilleri (incumbent)	35,309	100
Total votes		35,309	100.0

=== Republican primary ===
==== Nominee ====
- Marcie Grzywacz, Rockwood city councilor (2023–present)

==== Endorsements ====
Marcie Grzywacz

Organizations

- National Federation of Independent Businesses (post-primary)

==== Results ====
Republican primary results
Party	Candidate	Votes	%
Republican	Marcie Grzywacz	18,602	100
Total votes		18,602	100.0

=== General election ===
==== Results ====
2026 Michigan's 4th Senate district election results
Party	Candidate	Votes	%
Democratic	Darrin Camilleri (incumbent)	69,949	57.41
Republican	Marcie Grzywacz	49,339	40.49
Working Class	Walter Willis	1,641	1.35
U.S. Taxpayers	Beth Ann Socia	919	0.75
Total votes		121,848	100.0
Democratic hold			

== District 5 ==
The incumbent Democrat Dayna Polehanki, who was re-elected with 61.07% of the vote in 2022, was eligible for re-election but was moved into the 8th district as a result of redistricting.

=== Democratic primary ===
==== Nominee ====
- Matt Koleszar, state representative from the 22nd district (2019–present)

==== Endorsements ====
Matt Koleszar

Newspapers

- Detroit Free Press (post-primary)

==== Results ====
Democratic primary results
Party	Candidate	Votes	%
Democratic	Matt Koleszar	41,595	100
Total votes		41,595	100.0

=== Republican primary ===
==== Nominee ====
- Estelle Oliansky

==== Results ====
Republican primary results
Party	Candidate	Votes	%
Republican	Estelle Oliansky	15,796	100
Total votes		15,796	100.0

=== General election ===
==== Results ====
2026 Michigan's 5th Senate district election results
Party	Candidate	Votes	%
Democratic	Matt Koleszar	83,399	66.11
Republican	Estelle Oliansky	42,757	33.89
Total votes		126,156	100.0
Democratic hold			

== District 6 ==
The incumbent Democrat Mary Cavanagh, who was elected with 68.01% of the vote in 2022, ran for re-election.

=== Democratic primary ===
==== Nominee ====
- Mary Cavanagh, incumbent state senator (2023–present)

==== Eliminated in primary ====
- Stephen Jensen

==== Endorsements ====
Mary Cavanagh

Newspapers

- Detroit Free Press (post-primary)

==== Results ====
Democratic primary results
Party	Candidate	Votes	%
Democratic	Mary Cavanagh (incumbent)	37,383	85.70
Democratic	Stephen Jensen	6,240	14.30
Total votes		43,623	100.0

=== Republican primary ===
==== Nominee ====
- Joi Pokerwinski

==== Results ====
Republican primary results
Party	Candidate	Votes	%
Republican	Joi Pokerwinski	2,278	100
Total votes		2,278	100.0

=== General election ===
==== Results ====
2026 Michigan's 6th Senate district election results
Party	Candidate	Votes	%
Democratic	Mary Cavanagh (incumbent)	91,767	92.81
Republican	Joi Pokerwinski	7,104	7.19
Total votes		98,871	100.0
Democratic hold			

== District 7 ==
The incumbent Democrat Jeremy Moss, who was re-elected with 74.21% of the vote in 2022, was term-limited and ran for the U.S. House of Representatives.

=== Democratic primary ===
==== Nominee ====
- Jason Hoskins, state representative from the 18th district (2023–present)

==== Eliminated in primary ====
- Shadia Martini, 2022 and 2024 nominee for Michigan's 54th House of Representatives district
- Rakesh Ramakrishnan

==== Endorsements ====
Jason Hoskins

Organizations

- LGBTQ+ Victory Fund
- Reproductive Freedom for All (post-primary)

Newspapers

- Detroit Free Press (post-primary)

==== Results ====
Democratic primary results
Party	Candidate	Votes	%
Democratic	Jason Hoskins	29,117	57.20
Democratic	Shadia Martini	17,040	33.48
Democratic	Rakesh Ramakrishnan	4,744	9.32
Total votes		50,901	100.0

=== Republican primary ===
==== Nominee ====
- Anthony Paesano, attorney and nominee for Michigan's 19th House of Representatives district in 2022

==== Results ====
Republican primary results
Party	Candidate	Votes	%
Republican	Anthony Paesano	11,686	100
Total votes		11,686	100.0

=== General election ===
==== Results ====
2026 Michigan's 7th Senate district election results
Party	Candidate	Votes	%
Democratic	Jason Hoskins	88,930	71.36
Republican	Anthony Paesano	35,698	28.64
Total votes		124,554	100.0
Democratic hold			

== District 8 ==
The incumbent Democrat Mallory McMorrow, who was re-elected with 78.94% of the vote in 2022, was retiring to run for U.S. Senate. McMorrow suspended her campaign in July 2026. Fellow Democratic state senator Dayna Polehanki was moved into this district as a result of redistricting.

=== Democratic primary ===
==== Nominee ====
- Dayna Polehanki, state senator from the 5th district (2019–present)

==== Withdrawn ====
- Dean Raymond Wojtowicz

==== Declined ====
- Mallory McMorrow, incumbent state senator (2019–present) (ran for U.S. Senate)

==== Results ====
Democratic primary results
Party	Candidate	Votes	%
Democratic	Dayna Polehanki	46,011	100
Total votes		46,011	100.0

=== Republican primary ===
==== Nominee ====
- Kenneth D. Massey

==== Disqualified ====
- Jody White (ran for state supreme court)

==== Results ====
Republican primary results
Party	Candidate	Votes	%
Republican	Kenneth D. Massey	22,002	100
Total votes		22,002	100.0

=== General election ===
==== Results ====
2026 Michigan's 8th Senate district election results
Party	Candidate	Votes	%
Democratic	Dayna Polehanki	85,083	60.02
Republican	Kenneth D. Massey	56,675	39.98
Total votes		141,758	100.0
Democratic hold			

== District 9 ==
The incumbent Republican Michael Webber, who was re-elected with 50.35% of the vote in 2022, ran for re-election.

=== Republican primary ===
==== Nominee ====
- Michael Webber, incumbent state senator (2023–present)

==== Results ====
Republican primary results
Party	Candidate	Votes	%
Republican	Michael Webber (incumbent)	20,148	100
Total votes		20,148	100.0

=== Democratic primary ===
==== Nominee ====
- Theresa Brooks, Troy city councilor

==== Eliminated in primary ====
- Brendan Johnson, Oakland County commissioner from the 4th district (2023–present)
- Ren Nushaj

==== Endorsements ====
Theresa Brooks

Executive branch officials

- Pete Buttigieg, former secretary of transportation (2021–2025) (post-primary)

Labor unions

- Michigan AFL-CIO (post-primary)

Organizations

- Reproductive Freedom for All (post-primary)
- Vote Mama

Newspapers

- Detroit Free Press (post-primary)
Brendan Johnson

Organizations

- LGBTQ+ Victory Fund

==== Results ====
Democratic primary results
Party	Candidate	Votes	%
Democratic	Theresa Brooks	17,487	46.73
Democratic	Brendan Johnson	11,243	30.05
Democratic	Ren Nushaj	8,690	23.22
Total votes		37,420	100.0

=== Independents ===
==== Nominee ====
- Philippe M. Cicchini

=== General election ===
==== Results ====
2026 Michigan's 9th Senate district election results
Party	Candidate	Votes	%
Democratic	Theresa Brooks	64,588	52.51
Republican	Michael Webber (incumbent)	55,960	45.49
Working Class	Jacob Schodowski	1,468	1.19
Independent	Philippe M. Cicchini	994	0.81
Total votes		123,010	100.0
Democratic gain from Republican			

== District 10 ==
The incumbent Democrat Paul Wojno, who was re-elected with 67.70% of the vote in 2022, was term-limited.

=== Democratic primary ===
==== Nominee ====
- Natalie Price, state representative from the 6th district (2023–present)

==== Eliminated in primary ====
- Mark Anthony Murphy Jr.
- Amanda Treppa, member of the Royal Oak Local Officers Compensation Committee

==== Endorsements ====
Natalie Price

Local officials

- Michael Fournier, Royal Oak mayor (2016–present)

Labor unions

- Michigan AFL-CIO (post-primary)

Newspapers

- Detroit Free Press (post-primary)
Amanda Treppa

Local officials

- Karen McDonald, Oakland County prosecutor (2021–present)

Organizations

- Michigan Democratic Party Progressive Caucus
- Run for Something

==== Results ====
Democratic primary results
Party	Candidate	Votes	%
Democratic	Natalie Price	36,567	64.96
Democratic	Amanda Treppa	15,276	27.13
Democratic	Mark Anthony Murphy Jr.	4,451	7.91
Total votes		56,294	100.0

=== Republican primary ===
==== Nominee ====
- Michelle Nard, former Democratic Macomb County commissioner from the 12th district (2021–2025)

==== Results ====
Republican primary results
Party	Candidate	Votes	%
Republican	Michelle Nard	11,424	100
Total votes		11,424	100.0

=== General election ===
==== Results ====
2026 Michigan's 10th Senate district election results
Party	Candidate	Votes	%
Democratic	Natalie Price	97,199	73.17
Republican	Michelle Nard	35,650	26.83
Total votes		132,849	100.0
Democratic hold			

== District 11 ==
The incumbent Democrat Veronica Klinefelt, who was elected with 52.69% of the vote in 2022, ran for re-election.

=== Democratic primary ===
==== Nominee ====
- Veronica Klinefelt, incumbent state senator (2023–present)

==== Eliminated in primary ====
- Joseph Hunt
- Alysha Johnson

==== Endorsements ====
Veronica Klinefelt

Organizations

- Reproductive Freedom for All (post-primary)

Newspapers

- Detroit Free Press (post-primary)

==== Results ====
Democratic primary results
Party	Candidate	Votes	%
Democratic	Veronica Klinefelt (incumbent)	17,636	56.62
Democratic	Alysha Johnson	10,090	32.39
Democratic	Joseph Hunt	3,423	10.99
Total votes		31,149	100.0

=== Republican primary ===
==== Nominee ====
- Johnnie Townsend, 2025 candidate for Sterling Heights city council and former nonprofit president

==== Results ====
Republican primary results
Party	Candidate	Votes	%
Republican	Johnnie Townsend	14,476	100
Total votes		14,476	100.0

=== General election ===
==== Results ====
2026 Michigan's 11th Senate district election results
Party	Candidate	Votes	%
Democratic	Veronica Klinefelt (incumbent)	68,275	61.70
Republican	Johnnie Townsend	42,376	38.30
Write-in		4	0.00
Total votes		110,655	100.0
Democratic hold			

== District 12 ==
The incumbent Democrat Kevin Hertel, who was elected with 50.2% of the vote in 2022, ran for re-election.

=== Democratic primary ===
==== Nominee ====
- Kevin Hertel, incumbent state senator (2023–present)

==== Endorsements ====
Kevin Hertel

State legislators

- Paul Gieleghem, former HD-31 (1999–2004) (post-primary)

Organizations

- Reproductive Freedom for All (post-primary)

Newspapers

- Detroit Free Press (post-primary)

==== Results ====
Democratic primary results
Party	Candidate	Votes	%
Democratic	Kevin Hertel (incumbent)	35,910	100
Total votes		35,910	100.0

==== Nominee ====
- John Goldwater, businessman

==== Eliminated in primary ====
- Joseph A. Backus
- Patrick Biange
- Eileen Tesch
- Shelley Wright, businesswoman

==== Endorsements ====
John Goldwater

Organizations

- National Federation of Independent Businesses (post-primary)
Shelley Wright

State legislators

- Pamela Hornberger, former HD-32 (2017–2023)

==== Results ====
Republican primary results
Party	Candidate	Votes	%
Republican	John Goldwater	11,613	47.01
Republican	Shelley Wright	4,958	20.07
Republican	Joseph Backus	4,199	17.00
Republican	Eileen Tesch	2,763	11.19
Republican	Patrick Bainge	1,169	4.73
Total votes		24,702	100.0

=== General election ===
==== Results ====
2026 Michigan's 12th Senate district election results
Party	Candidate	Votes	%
Democratic	Kevin Hertel (incumbent)	70,569	53.47
Republican	John Goldwater	61,415	46.53
Total votes		131,984	100.0
Democratic hold			

== District 13 ==
The incumbent Democrat Rosemary Bayer, who was re-elected with 57.17% in 2022, is retiring.

=== Democratic primary ===
==== Nominee ====
- Sean Carlson, Oakland County deputy executive

==== Eliminated in primary ====
- DC Anderson
- Cecil George

==== Declined ====
- Rosemary Bayer, incumbent state senator (2019–present)

==== Endorsements ====
Sean Carlson

State legislators

- Rosemary Bayer, incumbent state senator (2019–present)

Organizations

- Michigan Association of Police Organizations PAC (post-primary)
- Reproductive Freedom for All (post-primary)
- Small Biz PAC (post-primary)

Newspapers

- Detroit Free Press (post-primary)

==== Results ====
Democratic primary results
Party	Candidate	Votes	%
Democratic	Sean Carlson	23,218	60.08
Democratic	Cecil George	10,742	27.79
Democratic	DC Anderson	4,688	12.13
Total votes		38,648	100.0

=== Republican primary ===
==== Nominee ====
- Ryan Berman, former state representative from the 39th district (2019–2022)

==== Endorsements ====
Ryan Berman

Organizations

- National Federation of Independent Businesses (post-primary)

==== Results ====
Republican primary results
Party	Candidate	Votes	%
Republican	Ryan Berman	21,591	100
Total votes		21,591	100.0

=== General election ===
==== Results ====
2026 Michigan's 13th Senate district election results
Party	Candidate	Votes	%
Democratic	Sean Carlson	71,616	53.05
Republican	Ryan Berman	63,387	46.95
Total votes		135,003	100.0
Democratic hold			

== District 14 ==
The incumbent Democrat, Sue Shink, who was re-elected with 55.80% of the vote in 2022, ran for re-election.

=== Democratic primary ===
==== Nominee ====
- Sue Shink, incumbent state senator (2023–present)

==== Endorsements ====
Sue Shink

Organizations

- Reproductive Freedom for All (post-primary)

==== Results ====
Democratic primary results
Party	Candidate	Votes	%
Democratic	Sue Shink (incumbent)	43,462	100
Total votes		43,462	100.0

=== Republican primary ===
==== Nominee ====
- Tawn Shawnelle Beliger

==== Withdrawn ====
- Brandon Bradley

==== Endorsements ====
Sue Shink

Organizations

- EMILYs List

==== Results ====
Republican primary results
Party	Candidate	Votes	%
Republican	Tawn Shawnelle Beliger	19,659	100
Total votes		19,659	100.0

=== General election ===
==== Results ====
2026 Michigan's 14th Senate district election results
Party	Candidate	Votes	%
Democratic	Sue Shink (incumbent)	79,281	60.51
Republican	Tawn Shawnelle Beliger	51,742	39.49
Total votes		131,023	100.0
Democratic hold			

== District 15 ==
The incumbent Democrat Jeff Irwin, who was re-elected with 74.15% of the vote in 2022, was term-limited.

=== Democratic primary ===
==== Nominee ====
- Felicia Brabec, state representative from the 33rd district (2021–2025)

==== Eliminated in primary ====
- Michael White

==== Endorsements ====
Felicia Brabec

Organizations

- Reproductive Freedom for All (post-primary)

==== Results ====
Democratic primary results
Party	Candidate	Votes	%
Democratic	Felicia Brabec	43,000	75.86
Democratic	Michael White	13,685	24.14
Total votes		56,685	100.0

=== Republican primary ===
==== Nominee ====
- Jason Rogers

==== Results ====
Republican primary results
Party	Candidate	Votes	%
Republican	Jason Rogers	10,633	100
Total votes		10,633	100.0

=== General election ===
==== Results ====
2026 Michigan's 15th Senate district election results
Party	Candidate	Votes	%
Democratic	Felicia Brabec	104,340	76.33
Republican	Jason Rogers	32,358	23.67
Write-in		1	0.00
Total votes		136,576	100.0
Democratic hold			

== District 16 ==
The incumbent Republican Joe Bellino, who was elected with 65.01% of the vote in 2022, ran for re-election.

=== Republican primary ===
==== Nominee ====
- Joe Bellino, incumbent state senator (2023–present)

==== Results ====
Republican primary results
Party	Candidate	Votes	%
Republican	Joe Bellino (incumbent)	26,257	100
Total votes		26,257	100.0

=== Democratic primary ===
==== Nominee ====
- Deandre Barnes

==== Endorsements ====
Deandre Barnes

Organizations

- Reproductive Freedom for All (post-primary)

==== Results ====
Democratic primary results
Party	Candidate	Votes	%
Democratic	Deandre Barnes	21,746	100
Total votes		21,746	100.0

=== General election ===
==== Results ====
2026 Michigan's 16th Senate district election results
Party	Candidate	Votes	%
Republican	Joe Bellino (incumbent)	74,861	61.74
Democratic	Deandre Barnes	46,386	38.26
Total votes		121,247	100.0
Democratic hold			

== District 17 ==
The incumbent Republican Jonathan Lindsey, who was elected with 65.39% of the vote in 2022, ran for re-election.

=== Republican primary ===
==== Nominee ====
- Jonathan Lindsey, incumbent state senator (2023–present)

==== Results ====
Republican primary results
Party	Candidate	Votes	%
Republican	Jonathan Lindsey (incumbent)	26,515	100
Total votes		26,515	100.0

=== Democratic primary ===
==== Nominee ====
- Ashleigh Baker

==== Eliminated in primary ====
- Mike Jones
- Brett Muchow

==== Results ====
Democratic primary results
Party	Candidate	Votes	%
Democratic	Ashleigh Baker	11,166	55.25
Democratic	Brett Muchow	5,174	25.60
Democratic	Mike Jones	3,871	19.15
Total votes		20,211	100.0

=== General election ===
==== Results ====
2026 Michigan's 17th Senate district election results
Party	Candidate	Votes	%
Republican	Jonathan Lindsey (incumbent)	65,771	60.78
Democratic	Ashleigh Baker	42,444	39.22
Total votes		108,215	100.0
Republican hold			

== District 18 ==
The incumbent Republican Thomas Albert, who was elected with 61.96% of the vote in 2022, ran for re-election.

=== Republican primary ===
==== Nominee ====
- Thomas Albert, incumbent state senator (2023–present)

==== Results ====
Republican primary results
Party	Candidate	Votes	%
Republican	Thomas Albert (incumbent)	28,587	100
Total votes		28,587	100.0

=== Democratic primary ===
==== Nominee ====
- Anthony Pennock

==== Endorsements ====
Anthony Pennock

Labor unions

- Michigan AFL-CIO (post-primary)

==== Results ====
Democratic primary results
Party	Candidate	Votes	%
Democratic	Anthony Pennock	25,671	100
Total votes		25,671	100.0

=== General election ===
==== Results ====
2026 Michigan's 18th Senate district election results
Party	Candidate	Votes	%
Republican	Thomas Albert (incumbent)	71,722	58.37
Democratic	Anthony Pennock	51,145	41.63
Total votes		122,867	100.0
Republican hold			

== District 19 ==
The incumbent Democrat Sean McCann, who was re-elected with 59.79% of the vote in 2022, was term-limited and ran for the U.S. House of Representatives.

=== Democratic primary ===
==== Nominee ====
- Julie Rogers, state representative from the 41st district (2021–present)

==== Endorsements ====
Julie Rogers

Organizations

- Reproductive Freedom for All (post-primary)

==== Results ====
Democratic primary results
Party	Candidate	Votes	%
Democratic	Julie Rogers	43,446	100
Total votes		43,446	100.0

=== Republican primary ===
==== Nominee ====
- Shaun Young

==== Results ====
Republican primary results
Party	Candidate	Votes	%
Republican	Shaun Young	18,149	100
Total votes		18,149	100.0

=== General election ===
==== Results ====
2026 Michigan's 19th Senate district election results
Party	Candidate	Votes	%
Democratic	Julie Rogers	83,024	64.41
Republican	Shaun Young	45,885	35.59
Total votes		128,909	100.0
Democratic hold			

== District 20 ==
The incumbent Republican Minority Leader Aric Nesbitt, who was re-elected with 60.95% of the vote in 2022, was term-limited.

=== Republican primary ===
==== Nominee ====
- Chris Moraitis, attorney

==== Eliminated in primary ====
- Curtis Clark
- Kenny Clevenger, Casco Township treasurer (2021–present) and former Allegan County Republican party chairman (2022–2025)

==== Endorsements ====
Chris Moraitis

Organizations

- Michigan Chamber of Commerce (post-primary)
- National Federation of Independent Businesses (post-primary)

==== Results ====
Republican primary results
Party	Candidate	Votes	%
Republican	Chris Moraitis	12,716	42.59
Republican	Kenny Clevenger	12,527	41.96
Republican	Curtis Clark	4,611	15.45
Total votes		29,854	100.0

=== Democratic primary ===
==== Nominee ====
- Dale Murney

==== Results ====
Democratic primary results
Party	Candidate	Votes	%
Democratic	Dale Murney	26,946	100
Total votes		26,946	100.0

=== General election ===
==== Results ====
2026 Michigan's 20th Senate district election results
Party	Candidate	Votes	%
Republican	Chris Moraitis	67,861	55.19
Democratic	Dale Murney	53,569	43.56
Green	Shamara Clay	1,541	1.25
Total votes		122,971	100.0
Republican hold			

== District 21 ==
The incumbent Democrat Sarah Anthony, who was elected with 60.29% of the vote in 2022, ran for re-election.

=== Democratic primary ===
==== Nominee ====
- Sarah Anthony, incumbent state senator (2023–present)

==== Endorsements ====
Sarah Anthony

Organizations

- Reproductive Freedom for All (post-primary)

==== Results ====
Democratic primary results
Party	Candidate	Votes	%
Democratic	Sarah Anthony (incumbent)	41,633	100
Total votes		41,633	100.0

=== Republican primary ===
==== Nominee ====
- Josh Burns

==== Results ====
Republican primary results
Party	Candidate	Votes	%
Republican	Josh Burns	17,770	100
Total votes		17,770	100.0

=== General election ===
==== Results ====
2026 Michigan's 21st Senate district election results
Party	Candidate	Votes	%
Democratic	Sarah Anthony (incumbent)	77,151	62.56
Republican	Josh Burns	46,170	37.44
Total votes		123,321	100.0
Democratic hold			

== District 22 ==
The incumbent Republican, Lana Theis, who was re-elected with 60.68% of the vote in 2022, was term-limited.

=== Republican primary ===
==== Nominee ====
- Mike Murphy, Livingston County sheriff (2017–present)

==== Endorsements ====
Mike Murphy

Organizations

- National Federation of Independent Businesses (post-primary)

==== Results ====
Republican primary results
Party	Candidate	Votes	%
Republican	Mike Murphy	33,990	100
Total votes		33,990	100.0

=== Democratic primary ===
==== Nominee ====
- Rob Hower, small business owner

==== Results ====
Democratic primary results
Party	Candidate	Votes	%
Democratic	Rob Hower	31,050	100
Total votes		31,050	100.0

=== General election ===
==== Results ====
2026 Michigan's 22nd Senate district election results
Party	Candidate	Votes	%
Republican	Mike Murphy	87,894	60.39
Democratic	Rob Hower	57,884	39.71
Total votes		145,778	100.0
Republican hold			

== District 23 ==
The incumbent Republican, Jim Runestad, who was re-elected with 59.38% of the vote in 2022, was term-limited.

=== Republican primary ===
==== Nominee ====
- Donni Steele, state representative from the 54th district (2021–present)

==== Eliminated in primary ====
- Daniel Lawless

==== Endorsements ====
Donni Steele

Organizations

- National Federation of Independent Businesses (post-primary)

==== Results ====
Republican primary results
Party	Candidate	Votes	%
Republican	Donni Steele	23,150	62.00
Republican	Daniel Lawless	14,188	38.00
Total votes		37,338	100.0

=== Democratic primary ===
==== Nominee ====
- Greg Hill

==== Eliminated in primary ====
- Margarette Gupta

==== Results ====
Democratic primary results
Party	Candidate	Votes	%
Democratic	Greg Hill	18,471	56.41
Democratic	Margarette Gupta	14,273	43.59
Total votes		32,744	100.0

=== General election ===
==== Results ====
2026 Michigan's 23rd Senate district election results
Party	Candidate	Votes	%
Republican	Donni Steele	85,006	58.76
Democratic	Greg Hill	59,658	41.24
Total votes		144,664	100.0
Republican hold			

== District 24 ==
The incumbent Republican, Ruth Johnson, who was re-elected with 65.80% of the vote in 2022, was term-limited.

=== Republican primary ===
==== Nominee ====
- Doug Wozniak, state representative from the 59th district (2023–present)

==== Eliminated in primary ====
- Terence Mekoski, former state representative from the 36th district (2022–2023)

==== Endorsements ====
Doug Wozniak

Organizations

- National Federation of Independent Businesses (post-primary)

Newspapers

- Detroit Free Press (post-primary)

==== Results ====
Republican primary results
Party	Candidate	Votes	%
Republican	Doug Wozniak	20,829	69.60
Republican	Terence Mekoski	9,099	30.40
Total votes		29,928	100.0

=== Democratic primary ===
==== Nominee ====
- Edlira Sako, nominee for Macomb County Board of Commissioners' 7th district in 2024

==== Eliminated in primary ====
- Frank Borsellino, candidate for Macomb County Board of Commissioners' 7th district in 2024

==== Results ====
Democratic primary results
Party	Candidate	Votes	%
Democratic	Edlira Sako	14,592	52.62
Democratic	Frank Borsellino	13,141	47.38
Total votes		27,733	100.0

=== General election ===
==== Results ====
2026 Michigan's 24th Senate district election results
Party	Candidate	Votes	%
Republican	Doug Wozniak	80,333	60.30
Democratic	Edlira Sako	52,880	39.70
Total votes		133,213	100.0
Republican hold			

== District 25 ==
The incumbent Republican, Dan Lauwers, who was re-elected with 66.83% of the vote in 2022, was term-limited.

=== Republican primary ===
==== Nominee ====
- Andrew Beeler, former state representative from the 64th district (2021–2024)

==== Eliminated in primary ====
- Gary Eisen, former state representative from the 81st district (2021–2023)
- John Mahaney, perennial candidate
- Randy Schultz, candidate for Mussey Township supervisor in 2024

==== Endorsements ====
Andrew Beeler

Organizations

- National Federation of Independent Businesses (post-primary)

==== Results ====
Republican primary results
Party	Candidate	Votes	%
Republican	Andrew Beeler	21,918	62.21
Republican	Gary Eisen	6,365	18.07
Republican	Randy Schultz	5,221	14.82
Republican	John Mahaney	1,727	4.90
Total votes		35,231	100.0

=== Democratic primary ===
==== Nominee ====
- April Osentowski

==== Results ====
Democratic primary results
Party	Candidate	Votes	%
Democratic	April Osentowski	22,694	100
Total votes		22,694	100.0

=== General election ===
==== Results ====
2026 Michigan's 25th Senate district election results
Party	Candidate	Votes	%
Republican	Andrew Beeler	81,080	65.40
Democratic	April Osentoski	42,900	34.60
Total votes		123,980	100.0
Republican hold			

== District 26 ==
The incumbent Republican, Kevin Daley, who was re-elected with 62.45% of the vote in 2022, was term-limited.

=== Republican primary ===
==== Nominee ====
- Matthew Bierlein, state representative from the 97th district (2023–present)

==== Eliminated in primary ====
- Daltson Atwell, landscaping contractor (previously ran for U.S. House of Representatives)
- Gabriel Lossing, farmer and veteran
- Candice Miller, retired businesswoman and candidate for Michigan's 8th congressional district in 2024
- James Graham

==== Endorsements ====
Matthew Bierlein

Organizations

- National Federation of Independent Businesses (post-primary)

==== Results ====
Republican primary results
Party	Candidate	Votes	%
Republican	Matthew Bierlein	14,183	42.99
Republican	Gabriel Lossing	8,154	24.71
Republican	Daltson Atwell	5,559	16.85
Republican	Candice Miller	3,766	11.41
Republican	James Graham	1,331	4.03
Total votes		32,993	100.0

=== Democratic primary ===
==== Nominee ====
- Brendan J. Johnson

==== Eliminated in primary ====
- Martin Cousineau

==== Withdrawn ====
- John Hall, veteran and retired teacher

==== Results ====
Democratic primary results
Party	Candidate	Votes	%
Democratic	Brendan J. Johnson	15,849	56.98
Democratic	Martin Cousineau	11,968	43.02
Total votes		27,817	100.0

=== General election ===
==== Results ====
2026 Michigan's 26th Senate district election results
Party	Candidate	Votes	%
Republican	Matthew Bierlein	74,623	60.62
Democratic	Brendan J. Johnson	48,484	39.38
Total votes		123,107	100.0
Republican hold			

== District 27 ==
The incumbent Democrat John Daniel Cherry, who was elected with 64.09% of the vote in 2022, ran for re-election.

=== Democratic primary ===
==== Nominee ====
- John Daniel Cherry, incumbent state senator (2023–present)

==== Results ====
Democratic primary results
Party	Candidate	Votes	%
Democratic	John Daniel Cherry (incumbent)	36,352	100
Total votes		36,352	100.0

=== Republican primary ===
==== Nominee ====
- Bill Bain, Flushing Township trustee

==== Eliminated in primary ====
- Tammy Parillo

==== Results ====
Republican primary results
Party	Candidate	Votes	%
Republican	Bill Bain	8,364	64.12
Republican	Tammy Parillo	4,680	35.88
Total votes		13,044	100.0

=== General election ===
==== Results ====
2026 Michigan's 27th Senate district election results
Party	Candidate	Votes	%
Democratic	John Daniel Cherry (incumbent)	71,771	66.63
Republican	Bill Bain	35,949	33.37
Total votes		107,720	100.0
Democratic hold			

== District 28 ==
The incumbent Democrat Sam Singh, who was elected with 55.80% of the vote in 2022, is retiring.

=== Democratic primary ===
==== Nominee ====
- Rashida Harrison, assistant professor at Michigan State University

==== Eliminated in primary ====
- Ted Kilvington
- Robert Orlando Pena
- Mark Polsdofer, Ingham County commissioner from the 14th district (2019–present)

==== Declined ====
- Sam Singh, incumbent state senator (2023–present)

==== Endorsements ====
Rashida Harrison

Organizations

- Reproductive Freedom for All (post-primary)

==== Results ====
Democratic primary results
Party	Candidate	Votes	%
Democratic	Rashida Harrison	17,723	41.76
Democratic	Mark Polsdofer	16,078	37.88
Democratic	Robert Pena	4,969	11.71
Democratic	Ted Kilvington	3,672	8.65
Total votes		42,442	100.0

=== Republican Primary ===
==== Nominee ====
- Julie DeRose

==== Results ====
Republican primary results
Party	Candidate	Votes	%
Republican	Julie DeRose	19,287	100
Total votes		19,287	100.0

=== General election ===
==== Results ====
2026 Michigan's 28th Senate district election results
Party	Candidate	Votes	%
Democratic	Rashida Harrison	71,741	56.85
Republican	Julie DeRose	51,061	40.47
Working Class	Wes Peterson	1,880	1.49
Libertarian	Brandon Crabill	1,501	1.19
Total votes		126,183	100.0
Democratic hold			

== District 29 ==
The incumbent Democratic majority leader Winnie Brinks, who was re-elected with 60.30% of the vote in 2022, was term-limited and ran for lieutenant governor.

=== Democratic primary ===
==== Nominee ====
- Abbie Groff-Blaszak, East Grand Rapids city commissioner

==== Eliminated in primary ====
- Ivan Diaz, former Kent County commissioner (2023–2025)
- Phil Skaggs, state representative from the 80th district (2023–present)

==== Endorsements ====
Ivan Diaz

Organizations

- Michigan Democratic Party Progressive Caucus
Abbie Groff-Baszak

Labor unions

- Michigan AFL-CIO (post-primary)

Organizations

- Reproductive Freedom for All (post-primary)
- Vote Mama

==== Results ====
Democratic primary results
Party	Candidate	Votes	%
Democratic	Abbie Groff-Blaszak	19,101	47.66
Democratic	Phil Skaggs	13,113	32.72
Democratic	Ivan Diaz	7,865	19.62
Total votes		40,079	100.0

=== Republican primary ===
==== Nominee ====
- Brady Middleton

==== Results ====
Republican primary results
Party	Candidate	Votes	%
Republican	Brady Middleton	13,405	100
Total votes		13,405	100.0

=== General election ===
==== Results ====
2026 Michigan's 29th Senate district election results
Party	Candidate	Votes	%
Democratic	Abbie Groff-Blaszak	75,355	68.49
Republican	Brady Middleton	34,662	31.51
Total votes		110,017	100.0
Democratic hold			

== District 30 ==
The incumbent Republican, Mark Huizenga, who was re-elected with 49.18% of the vote in 2022, ran for re-election.

=== Republican primary ===
==== Nominee ====
- Mark Huizenga, incumbent state senator (2021–present)

==== Results ====
Republican primary results
Party	Candidate	Votes	%
Republican	Mark Huizenga (incumbent)	26,812	100
Total votes		26,812	100.0

=== Democratic primary ===
==== Nominee ====
- Carol Glanville, state representative from the 84th district (2022–present)

==== Eliminated in primary ====
- Rickie Kreuzer, nonprofit executive director and member of the Michigan State Board of Nursing

==== Endorsements ====
Carol Glanville

Executive branch officials

- Pete Buttigieg, former secretary of transportation (2021–2025) (post-primary)

Organizations

- EMILYs List
- Reproductive Freedom for All (post-primary)

==== Results ====
Democratic primary results
Party	Candidate	Votes	%
Democratic	Carol Glanville	36,013	83.43
Democratic	Rickie Kreuzer	7,151	16.57
Total votes		43,164	100.0

=== General election ===
==== Results ====
2026 Michigan's 30th Senate district election results
Party	Candidate	Votes	%
Democratic	Carol Glanville	76,411	54.90
Republican	Mark Huizenga (incumbent)	62,777	45.10
Total votes		139,188	100.0
Democratic gain from Republican			

== District 31 ==
The incumbent Republican, Roger Victory, who was re-elected with 62.11% of the vote in 2022, was term-limited and ran for the Michigan State University Board of Trustees.

=== Republican primary ===
==== Nominee ====
- John Wetzel, businessman

==== Eliminated in primary ====
- Kevin Maas, businessman
- Michael Markey Jr., businessman, disqualified candidate for governor in 2022, and candidate for Michigan's 3rd congressional district in 2024 (previously ran for U.S. House)

==== Endorsements ====
John Wetzel

Organizations

- Michigan Chamber of Commerce (post-primary)
- National Federation of Independent Businesses (post-primary)

==== Results ====
Republican primary results
Party	Candidate	Votes	%
Republican	John Wetzel	16,514	40.23
Republican	Kevin Maas	13,428	32.71
Republican	Michael Markey Jr.	11,112	27.07
Total votes		41,054	100.0

=== Democratic primary ===
==== Nominee ====
- Chris Kleinjans, former Ottawa County commissioner (2024)

==== Eliminated in primary ====
- Keagan Host

==== Endorsements ====
Chris Kleinjans

Organizations

- Reproductive Freedom for All (post-primary)

==== Results ====
Democratic primary results
Party	Candidate	Votes	%
Democratic	Chris Kleinjans	24,165	75.40
Democratic	Keagan Host	7,886	24.60
Total votes		32,051	100.0

=== General election ===
==== Results ====
2026 Michigan's 31st Senate district election results
Party	Candidate	Votes	%
Republican	John Wetzel	82,119	57.72
Democratic	Chris Kleinjans	60,140	42.28
Total votes		142,259	100.0
Democratic hold			

== District 32 ==
The incumbent Republican, Jon Bumstead, who was re-elected with 52.83% of the vote in 2022, was term-limited.

=== Republican primary ===
==== Nominee ====
- Kim Cole, Mason County sheriff (2012–present)

==== Eliminated in primary ====
- Max Riekse, veteran, teacher, libertarian nominee for the 91st state house district in 2016, and nominee for Muskegon County sheriff in 2024

==== Endorsements ====
Kim Cole

State legislators

- Jon Bumstead, incumbent state senator (2019–present)

Organizations

- National Federation of Independent Businesses (post-primary)

==== Results ====
Republican primary results
Party	Candidate	Votes	%
Republican	Kim Cole	20,496	76.05
Republican	Max Riekse	6,453	23.95
Total votes		26,949	100.0

=== Democratic primary ===
==== Nominee ====
- Rebecca Amidon, adjunct professor at Mid Michigan College

==== Withdrawn ====
- Jay Kilgo, Muskegon city commissioner

==== Endorsements ====
Rebecca Amidon

Executive branch officials

- Pete Buttigieg, former secretary of transportation (2021–2025) (post-primary)

U.S. senators

- Debbie Stabenow, former Michigan (2001–2025) (post-primary)

State legislators

- Mary Valentine, former HD-91 (2007–2011)

Local officials

- Barbara Byrum, Ingham County clerk (2013–present)

Labor unions

- EMILYs List
- International Brotherhood of Teamsters Local 406

Organizations

- Manistee County Democratic Party
- Mason County Democratic Party
- Vote Mama

==== Results ====
Democratic primary results
Party	Candidate	Votes	%
Democratic	Rebecca Amidon	32,271	100
Total votes		32,271	100.0

=== General election ===
==== Results ====
2026 Michigan's 32nd Senate district election results
Party	Candidate	Votes	%
Democratic	Rebecca Amidon	62,498	50.50
Republican	Kim Cole	61,266	49.50
Total votes		123,764	100.0
Democratic gain from Republican			

== District 33 ==
The incumbent Republican, Rick Outman, who was re-elected with 66.25% of the vote in 2022, was term-limited.

=== Republican primary ===
==== Nominee ====
- Gina Johnsen, state representative from the 78th district (2023–present)

==== Eliminated in primary ====
- Katie DeBoer, Kent County commissioner from the 4th district
- Joseph Fox, state representative from the 101st district (2023–present)
- Tom Norton, veteran

==== Endorsements ====
Gina Johnsen

State legislators

- Jon Bumstead, SD-32 (2019–present)
- Mark Huizenga, SD-30 (2019–present)
- Roger Victory, SD-31 (2019–present)

Organizations

- Michigan Chamber of Commerce (post-primary)
- National Federation of Independent Businesses (post-primary)

==== Results ====
Republican primary results
Party	Candidate	Votes	%
Republican	Gina Johnsen	11,904	32.68
Republican	Katie DeBoer	10,434	28.64
Republican	Joseph Fox	7,719	21.19
Republican	Thomas Norton	6,373	17.50
Total votes		36,430	100.0

=== Democratic primary ===
==== Nominee ====
- Stan Opal

==== Endorsements ====
Stan Opal

Labor unions

- Michigan AFL-CIO (post-primary)

==== Results ====
Democratic primary results
Party	Candidate	Votes	%
Democratic	Stan Opal	22,227	100
Total votes		22,227	100.0

=== General election ===
==== Results ====
2026 Michigan's 33rd Senate district election results
Party	Candidate	Votes	%
Republican	Gina Johnsen	80,036	65.49
Democratic	Stan Opan	42,167	34.51
Total votes		122,203	100.0
Republican hold			

== District 34 ==
The incumbent Republican, Roger Hauck, who was elected with 64.35% of the vote in 2022, ran for re-election.

=== Republican primary ===
==== Nominee ====
- Roger Hauck, incumbent state senator (2023–present)

==== Eliminated in primary ====
- Rhonda Lange, realtor and member of the Michigan Independent Redistricting Commission

==== Results ====
Republican primary results
Party	Candidate	Votes	%
Republican	Roger Hauck (incumbent)	25,943	84.74
Republican	Rhonda Lange	4,671	15.26
Total votes		30,614	100.0

=== Democratic primary ===
==== Nominee ====
- Tyler Landgraf

==== Results ====
Democratic primary results
Party	Candidate	Votes	%
Democratic	Tyler Landgraf	22,200	100
Total votes		22,200	100.0

=== General election ===
==== Results ====
2026 Michigan's 34th Senate district election results
Party	Candidate	Votes	%
Republican	Roger Hauck (incumbent)	74,114	63.45
Democratic	Tyler Landgraf	42,698	36.55
Total votes		116,812	100.0
Republican hold			

== District 35 ==
The Democratic state senator from this seat, Kristen McDonald Rivet, was elected with 53.38% of the vote in 2022. McDonald Rivet later resigned to take a seat in the United States House of Representatives, and fellow Democrat Chedrick Greene was elected in a special election to succeed her.

=== Democratic primary ===
==== Nominee ====
- Chedrick Greene, incumbent state senator (2026–present)

==== Withdrawn ====
- Brandell Adams, chair of the Saginaw County Democrats, former Bridgeport Township trustee, and candidate for this seat in the special election
- Serenity Hope Salak, substitute teacher and candidate for this seat in the special election

==== Endorsements ====
Chedrick Greene

Executive branch officials

- Pete Buttigieg, former secretary of transportation (2021–2025) (post-primary)

Labor unions

- Michigan AFL-CIO
- Michigan Education Association

Organizations

- Michigan Fraternal Order of Police (post-primary)
- Small Biz PAC (post-primary)

==== Results ====
Democratic primary results
Party	Candidate	Votes	%
Democratic	Chedrick Greene (incumbent)	37,569	100
Total votes		37,569	100.0

=== Republican primary ===
==== Nominee ====
- Jason Tunney, attorney and nominee for this seat in the special election

==== Eliminated in primary ====
- Chadwick Twillman, businessman and candidate for this seat in the special election

==== Endorsements ====
Jason Tunney

U.S. representatives

- Mike Rogers, MI-8 (2001–2015) (post-primary)

Organizations

- National Federation of Independent Businesses (post-primary)

==== Results ====
Republican primary results
Party	Candidate	Votes	%
Republican	Jason Tunney	20,362	89.64
Republican	Chadwick Twillman	2,353	10.36
Total votes		22,715	100.0

=== General election ===
==== Results ====
2026 Michigan's 35th Senate district election results
Party	Candidate	Votes	%
Democratic	Chedrick Greene (incumbent)	68,308	55.56
Republican	Jason Tunney	52,804	42.95
U.S. Taxpayers	Laurie Atwood	1,825	1.49
Total votes		122,937	100.0
Democratic hold			

== District 36 ==
The incumbent Republican, Michele Hoitenga, who was elected with 66.26% of the vote in 2022, ran for re-election.

=== Republican primary ===
==== Nominee ====
- Michele Hoitenga, incumbent state senator (2022–present)

==== Results ====
Republican primary results
Party	Candidate	Votes	%
Republican	Michele Hoitenga (incumbent)	39,198	100
Total votes		39,198	100.0

=== Democratic primary ===
==== Nominee ====
- Mark Yonkman

==== Results ====
Democratic primary results
Party	Candidate	Votes	%
Democratic	Mark Yonkman	25,922	100
Total votes		25,922	100.0

=== General election ===
==== Results ====
2026 Michigan's 36th Senate district election results
Party	Candidate	Votes	%
Republican	Michele Hoitenga (incumbent)	89,680	66.07
Democratic	Mark Yonkman	46,056	33.93
Total votes		135,736	100.0
Republican hold			

== District 37 ==
The incumbent Republican, John Damoose, who was elected with 55.46% of the vote in 2022, ran for re-election.

=== Republican primary ===
==== Nominee ====
- John Damoose, incumbent state senator (2022–present)

==== Results ====
Republican primary results
Party	Candidate	Votes	%
Republican	John Damoose (incumbent)	34,470	100
Total votes		34,470	100.0

=== Democratic primary ===
==== Nominee ====
- Kate Gallup

==== Eliminated in primary ====
- Mitchell Treadwell

==== Results ====
Democratic primary results
Party	Candidate	Votes	%
Democratic	Kate Gallup	32,236	78.09
Democratic	Mitchell Treadwell	9,045	21.91
Total votes		41,281	100.0

=== General election ===
==== Results ====
2026 Michigan's 37th Senate district election results
Party	Candidate	Votes	%
Republican	John Damoose (incumbent)	80,388	54.47
Democratic	Kate Gallup	67,191	45.53
Total votes		147,579	100.0
Republican hold			

== District 38 ==
The incumbent Republican, Ed McBroom, who was re-elected with 62.23% of the vote in 2022, was term-limited.

=== Republican primary ===
==== Nominee ====
- David Prestin, state representative from the 108th district (2023–present)

==== Eliminated in primary ====
- Beau LaFave, former state representative from the 108th district (2017–2022) and 2022 candidate for Secretary of State

==== Withdrawn ====
- Christopher Reynolds, teacher (ran for state representative)
- Kayla Wikstrom, Libertarian nominee for the 108th district in 2024

==== Endorsements ====
Beau LaFave

U.S. representatives

- Jack Bergman, MI-1 (2017–present)
David Prestin

State legislators

- Ed McBroom, incumbent state senator (2019–present)

Individuals

- Ted Nugent, singer and songwriter

Organizations

- Michigan Chamber of Commerce (post-primary)
- National Federation of Independent Businesses (post-primary)

==== Results ====
Republican primary results
Party	Candidate	Votes	%
Republican	David Prestin	17,099	52.99
Republican	Beau LaFave	15,168	47.01
Total votes		32,267	100.0

=== Democratic primary ===
==== Nominee ====
- Kelli van Ginhoven, vice chair of the Delta County Board of Commissioners from the 4th district

==== Withdrawn ====
- Jake La Jeunesse, teacher
- Chris Mapps, veteran

==== Results ====
Democratic primary results
Party	Candidate	Votes	%
Democratic	Kelli van Ginhoven	30,552	100
Total votes		30,552	100.0

=== Independents ===
==== Declared ====
- Sara Cambensy, former Democratic state representative from the 109th district (2017–2022)

=== General election ===
==== Results ====
2026 Michigan's 38th Senate district election results
Party	Candidate	Votes	%
Republican	David Prestin	65,017	52.04
Democratic	Kelli van Ginhoven	48,682	38.97
Independent	Sara Cambensy	11,230	8.99
Total votes		124,929	100.0
Republican hold			
