= 2022 Michigan Senate election =

- November 8, 2022

38 seats in the Michigan Senate 20 seats needed for a majority

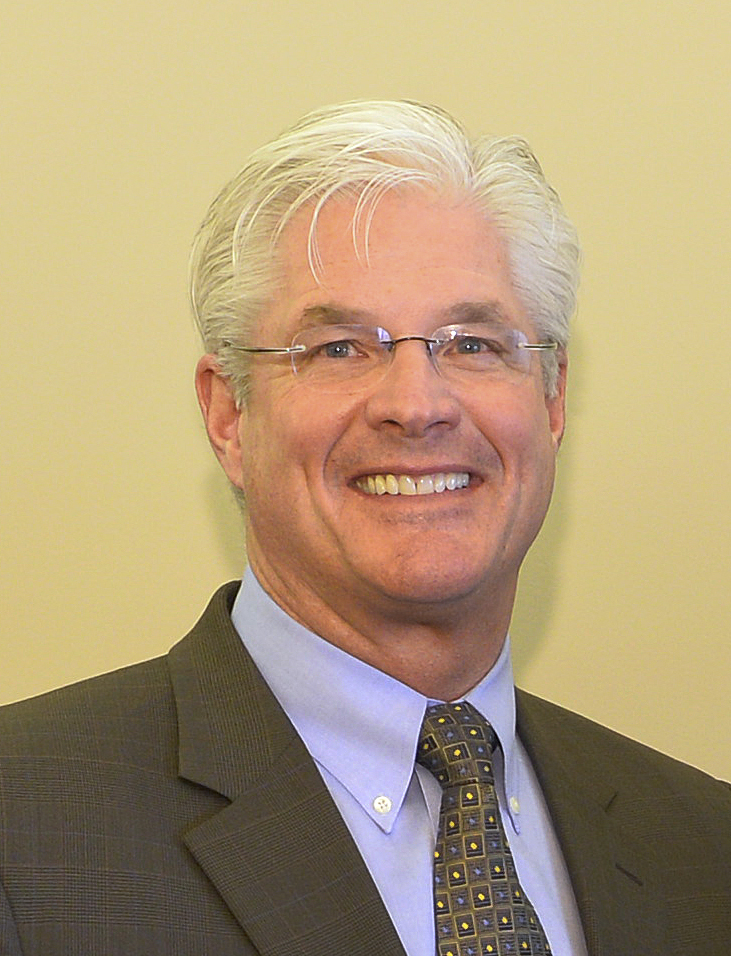
	Majority party	Minority party
Leader	Jim Ananich (term-limited)	Mike Shirkey (term-limited)
Party	Democratic	Republican
Leader since	January 14, 2015	January 9, 2019
Leader's seat	27th district	16th district
Seats before	16	22
Seats after	20	18
Seat change	▲4	▼4
Popular vote	2,183,727	2,111,775
Percentage	50.41%	48.75%
Swing	▲0.16%	▲0.71%
- Democratic hold Democratic gain Republican hold 50–60% 60–70% 70–80% 80–90% 40–50% 50–60% 60–70%
Majority Leader before election
Mike Shirkey
Republican
Elected Majority Leader
Democratic

The 2022 Michigan Senate election occurred on November 8, 2022, to elect all 38 members to the Michigan Senate. The election coincided with elections for all of Michigan's constitutional offices; governor, attorney general, secretary of state and all 110 seats in the Michigan House of Representatives. Seats in the Michigan Senate were last elected in 2018.

Democrats gained four seats, giving them a majority of 20 out of 38 seats and winning control of the chamber for the first time since 1984. Simultaneously, Democrats made gains in the state house, winning control of that chamber for the first time since 2008, while Gretchen Whitmer won re-election. As a result, Democrats won a trifecta in the state for the first time in 40 years.

== Background ==
This was the first election to take place after redistricting based on the 2020 United States census. Following a voter-passed constitutional amendment in 2018, the state legislature no longer creates legislative and congressional districts and was replaced by Michigan's Independent Citizens Redistricting Commission, a 13-member bipartisan committee.

== Term-limited members ==
Under the Michigan Constitution, state representatives and senators are limited to twelve years combined in either chamber of the legislature, after voters approved on November 8 a constitutional amendment that revised term limits. Until this election, members of the state Senate were able to serve only two four-year terms, and members of the House of Representatives were limited to three two-year terms. Michigan has what are considered the toughest term limits in the country. The following members are prevented by previous term limits from seeking re-election to the Senate in 2022. This list does not include members that are eligible for re-election, but chose instead to seek other office or voluntarily retire.

=== Republicans (5) ===
- 16th district: Mike Shirkey
- 17th district: Dale Zorn
- 32nd district: Kenneth Horn
- 36th district: Jim Stamas
- 37th district: Wayne Schmidt

=== Democrats (2) ===
- 23rd district: Curtis Hertel Jr.
- 27th district: Jim Ananich

== Predictions ==
Source	Ranking	As of
Sabato's Crystal Ball	Tossup	May 19, 2022

== Results ==
Popular vote
Democratic	50.41%
Republican	48.75%
Other	0.84%

Senate seats
Democratic	52.63%
Republican	47.37%

=== Closest races ===
Seats where the margin of victory was under 10%:

1. District 30, 0.3%
2. District 12, 0.32% (gain)
3. District 9, 0.7%
4. District 11, 5.38% (gain)
5. District 32, 5.66%
6. District 35, 6.76% (gain)

== General election ==
All results below are from the certified election results posted by the Secretary of State.

=== District 1 ===
1st district
Party	Candidate	Votes	%
Democratic	Erika Geiss (incumbent)	53,475	71.57%
Republican	Erik Soderquist	21,243	28.43%
Total votes		74,718	100%

=== District 2 ===
2nd district
Party	Candidate	Votes	%
Democratic	Sylvia Santana (incumbent)	43,258	67.99%
Republican	Harry T. Sawicki	18,726	29.43%
Working Class	Larry Betts	1,632	2.57%
Write-in		4	0.01
Total votes		63,620	100%

=== District 3 ===
3rd district
Party	Candidate	Votes	%
Democratic	Stephanie Chang (incumbent)	61,247	85.67%
Working Class	Linda Rayburn	10,243	14.33%
Total votes		71,490	100%

=== District 4 ===
4th district
Party	Candidate	Votes	%
Democratic	Darrin Camilleri	64,387	55.34%
Republican	Houston James	51,962	44.66%
Total votes		116,349	100%

=== District 5 ===
5th district
Party	Candidate	Votes	%
Democratic	Dayna Polehanki (incumbent)	64,455	61.07%
Republican	Emily Bauman	41,091	38.93%
Total votes		105,546	100%

=== District 6 ===
6th district
Party	Candidate	Votes	%
Democratic	Mary Cavanagh	74,122	68.01%
Republican	Ken Crider	31,463	28.87%
Working Class	Kimberly Givens	3,396	3.12%
Total votes		108,981	100%

=== District 7 ===
7th district
Party	Candidate	Votes	%
Democratic	Jeremy Moss (incumbent)	80,597	74.21%
Republican	Corinne Khederian	28,008	25.79%
Total votes		108,605	100%

=== District 8 ===
8th district
Party	Candidate	Votes	%
Democratic	Mallory McMorrow (incumbent)	94,878	78.94%
Republican	Brandon Ronald Simpson	25,309	21.06%
Total votes		120,187	100%

=== District 9 ===
9th district
Party	Candidate	Votes	%
Republican	Michael Weber	57,953	50.35%
Democratic	Padma Kuppa	57,158	49.65%
Total votes		115,111	100%

=== District 10 ===
10th district
Party	Candidate	Votes	%
Democratic	Paul Wojno (incumbent)	60,375	67.70%
Republican	Paul M. Smith	28,810	32.30%
Total votes		89,185	100%

=== District 11 ===
11th district
Party	Candidate	Votes	%
Democratic	Veronica Klinefelt	56,119	52.69%
Republican	Mike MacDonald (incumbent)	50,395	47.31%
Total votes		106,514	100%

=== District 12 ===
12th district
Party	Candidate	Votes	%
Democratic	Kevin Hertel	62,772	50.16%
Republican	Pamela Hornberger	62,368	49.84%
Total votes		125,140	100%

=== District 13 ===
13th district
Party	Candidate	Votes	%
Democratic	Rosemary Bayer (incumbent)	78,098	57.17%
Republican	Jason Rhines	58,513	42.83%
Total votes		136,611	100%

=== District 14 ===
14th district
Party	Candidate	Votes	%
Democratic	Sue Shink	68,609	55.89%
Republican	Tim Golding	54,143	44.11%
Total votes		122,752	100%

=== District 15 ===
15th district
Party	Candidate	Votes	%
Democratic	Jeff Irwin (incumbent)	89,399	74.15%
Republican	Scott Price	31,172	25.85%
Total votes		120,571	100%

=== District 16 ===
16th district
Party	Candidate	Votes	%
Republican	Joseph Bellino	73,403	65.01%
Democratic	Katybeth Davis	39,503	34.99%
Total votes		112,906	100%

=== District 17 ===
17th district
Party	Candidate	Votes	%
Republican	Jonathan Lindsey	66,134	65.39%
Democratic	Scott Rex Starr	35,011	34.61%
Total votes		101,145	100%

=== District 18 ===
18th district
Party	Candidate	Votes	%
Republican	Thomas Albert	72,027	61.96%
Democratic	Kai W. Degraaf	44,223	38.04%
Total votes		116,250	100%

=== District 19 ===
19th district
Party	Candidate	Votes	%
Democratic	Sean McCann (incumbent)	70,507	59.79%
Republican	Tamara Mitchell	47,427	40.21%
Total votes		117,934	100%

=== District 20 ===
20th district
Party	Candidate	Votes	%
Republican	Aric Nesbitt (incumbent)	69,316	60.95%
Democratic	Kim Jorgensen Gane	44,403	39.05%
Total votes		113,719	100%

=== District 21 ===
21st district
Party	Candidate	Votes	%
Democratic	Sarah Anthony	68,534	60.29%
Republican	Nkenge Ayanna Robertson	45,145	39.71%
Total votes		113,679	100%

=== District 22 ===
22nd district
Party	Candidate	Votes	%
Republican	Lana Theis (incumbent)	83,957	60.68%
Democratic	Jordan Genso	50,738	36.67%
Libertarian	Jon Elgas	2,478	1.79%
U.S. Taxpayers'	Victoria McCasey	1,198	0.87%
Total votes		138,371	100%

=== District 23 ===
23rd district
Party	Candidate	Votes	%
Republican	Jim Runestad (incumbent)	78,175	59.38%
Democratic	Una Hepburn	53,474	40.62%
Total votes		131,649	100%

=== District 24 ===
24th district
Party	Candidate	Votes	%
Republican	Ruth Johnson (incumbent)	87,171	65.80%
Democratic	Theresa J. Fougnie	45,316	34.20%
Total votes		132,487	100%

=== District 25 ===
25th district
Party	Candidate	Votes	%
Republican	Dan Lauwers (incumbent)	78,193	66.83%
Democratic	Bert Van Dyke	38,811	33.17%
Total votes		117,004	100%

=== District 26 ===
26th district
Party	Candidate	Votes	%
Republican	Kevin Daley (incumbent)	74,158	62.45%
Democratic	Charles Stadler	44,599	37.55%
Total votes		118,757	100%

=== District 27 ===
27th district
Party	Candidate	Votes	%
Democratic	John Daniel Cherry	64,189	64.09%
Republican	Aaron R. Gardner	35,972	35.91%
Total votes		100,161	100%

=== District 28 ===
28th district
Party	Candidate	Votes	%
Democratic	Sam Singh	65,537	55.80%
Republican	Daylen Howard	49,272	41.95%
U.S. Taxpayers'	Matthew Shepard	2,635	2.24%
Total votes		117,444	100%

=== District 29 ===
29th district
Party	Candidate	Votes	%
Democratic	Winnie Brinks (incumbent)	59,407	60.30%
Republican	Tommy Brann	39,115	39.70%
Total votes		98,522	100%

=== District 30 ===
Results by county Huizenga: 60–70%; LaGrand: 50–60%

Results by precinct Huizenga: 40–50%; 50–60%; 60–70%; 70–80%; >90%; LaGrand: 40–50%; 50–60%; 60–70%; 70–80%; 80–90%

30th district
Party	Candidate	Votes	%
Republican	Mark Huizenga (incumbent)	63,754	49.18%
Democratic	David LaGrand	63,363	48.88%
Libertarian	Theo Petzold	2,516	1.94%
Total votes		129,633	100%

=== District 31 ===
31st district
Party	Candidate	Votes	%
Republican	Roger Victory (incumbent)	82,383	62.11%
Democratic	Kim S. Nagy	47,413	35.75%
Libertarian	Jessica Fox	2,845	2.14%
Total votes		132,641	100%

=== District 32 ===
32nd district
Party	Candidate	Votes	%
Republican	Jon Bumstead (incumbent)	61,113	52.83%
Democratic	Terry Sabo	54,557	47.17%
Total votes		115,670	100%

=== District 33 ===
33rd district
Party	Candidate	Votes	%
Republican	Rick Outman (incumbent)	77,239	66.25%
Democratic	Mark Bignell	36,915	31.66%
Libertarian	Joseph Gillotte	2,438	2.09%
Total votes		116,592	100%

=== District 34 ===
34th district
Party	Candidate	Votes	%
Republican	Roger Hauck	71,202	64.35%
Democratic	Christine Gerace	36,757	33.22%
U.S. Taxpayers'	Becky McDonald	2,682	2.42%
Total votes		110,641	100%

=== District 35 ===
35th district
Party	Candidate	Votes	%
Democratic	Kristen McDonald Rivet	62,105	53.38%
Republican	Annette Glenn	54,246	46.62%
Total votes		116,351	100%

=== District 36 ===
36th district
Party	Candidate	Votes	%
Republican	Michele Hoitenga	87,453	66.26%
Democratic	Joel Sheltrown	44,529	33.74%
Total votes		131,982	100%

=== District 37 ===
37th district
Party	Candidate	Votes	%
Republican	John Damoose	79,125	55.46%
Democratic	Barbara Conley	61,069	42.81%
Libertarian	Zachary Dean	2,468	1.73%
Total votes		142,662	100%

=== District 38 ===
Results by county McBroom: 50–60%; 60–70%; 70–80%; Braamse: 50–60%

Results by precinct McBroom: 50–60%; 60–70%; 70–80%; 80–90%; Braamse: 40–50%; 50–60%; 60–70%; Tie: 50%

38th district
Party	Candidate	Votes	%
Republican	Ed McBroom (incumbent)	74,639	62.23%
Democratic	John Braamse	43,818	36.54%
Green	Wade Roberts	1,475	1.23%
Total votes		119,932	100%

== See also ==
- 2022 Michigan House of Representatives election
