= University of Michigan Business Engagement Center =

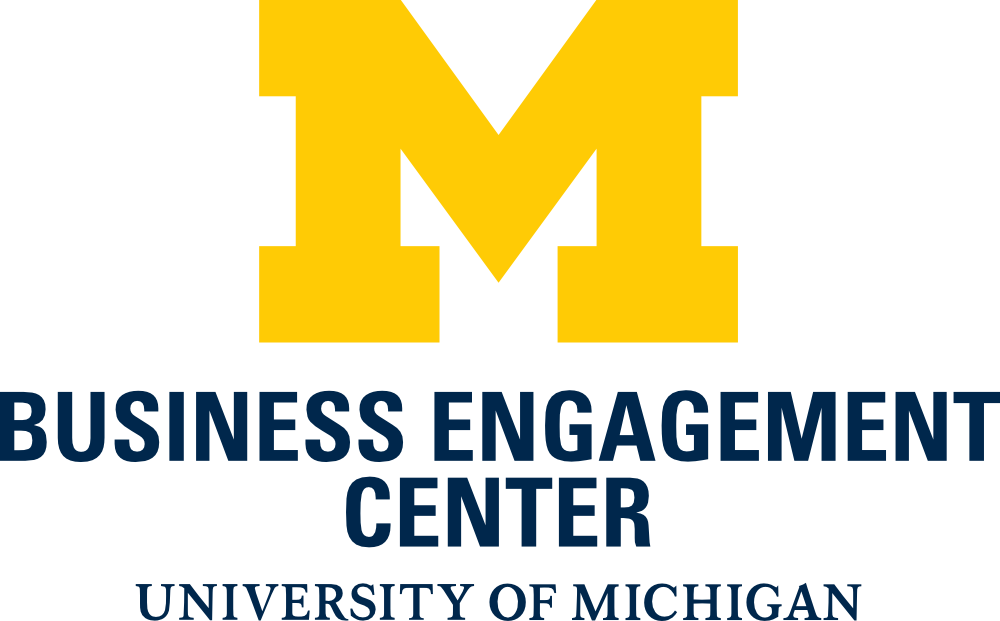

The Business Engagement Center (BEC) is an office of the University of Michigan (U-M) that connects companies with university resources. Located in Ann Arbor, MI on the U-M North Campus, the BEC and partner offices in the College of Engineering, School of Medicine and U-M Dearborn facilitate connections with companies by linking business needs with University resources in research, technology, education, student talent, and strategic giving on the U-M campuses. Currently, the BEC has 14 staff members that collaborate on projects and engagement efforts and works with businesses.

== History ==
The Business Engagement Center was established at the University of Michigan in the fall of 2007. The goal of the organization is to strengthen the University’s business and community partnerships and help revitalize and diversify the state of Michigan’s economy. The BEC is funded jointly by the U-M Office of the Vice President for Research and the Office for University Development.

In May 2008, the BEC opened on the University of Michigan Central Campus in the Galleria Building located on South University Avenue in Ann Arbor, MI, where it was co-located with the U-M Office of Technology Transfer. The BEC has three satellite offices: College of Engineering Corporate Relations Office, Medical School Business Development Office, and the U-M Dearborn BEC. These offices work together to create partnerships with companies by linking business needs of these companies with university resources: research discoveries, new technology developments, use of high-tech university facilities, access to student and alumni talent, U-M education programs, and opportunities for philanthropic support.

In September 2010, the BEC moved to the North Campus Research Complex (NCRC), where it continues to be co-located with the U-M Office of Technology Transfer. In 2011, the BEC approach went statewide with the launch of the Michigan Corporate Relations Network (M-CRN). The goal of the M-CRN is to provide companies with greater access to the pool of talent, resources, and facilities at research universities. These university partners include Michigan State University, Michigan Technological University, the University of Michigan, University of Michigan-Dearborn, Wayne State University, and Western Michigan University. Collectively, these six institutions account for 98 percent of the academic research and 99 percent of all patent activity done in the state of Michigan. This initiative helps increase the growth and productivity of Michigan-based companies. Teaching and research opportunities also attract new businesses to the state. For this program, the Michigan Economic Development Corporation (MEDC) awarded a grant of more than $1.8 million to help fund the M-CRN.

== BEC connections ==
The BEC staff works with all 19 U-M schools and colleges, UM-Dearborn and UM-Flint, maintains relationships with more than 1,200 companies, and is contacted by nearly 200 new companies each year. The BEC partners in local economic development and works closely with other nearby organizations that drive growth, such as Ann Arbor Spark, the Michigan Economic Development Corporation, The Right Place, and Southwest Michigan First. The BEC collaborates with influential local institutions, such as the A2Y Chamber, the Detroit Regional Chamber of Commerce, Grand Rapids Area Chamber of Commerce, the Small Business Association of Michigan, and the Traverse City Area Chamber of Commerce.
