= 2018 Michigan Senate election =

- November 6, 2018

38 seats in the Michigan Senate 20 seats needed for a majority
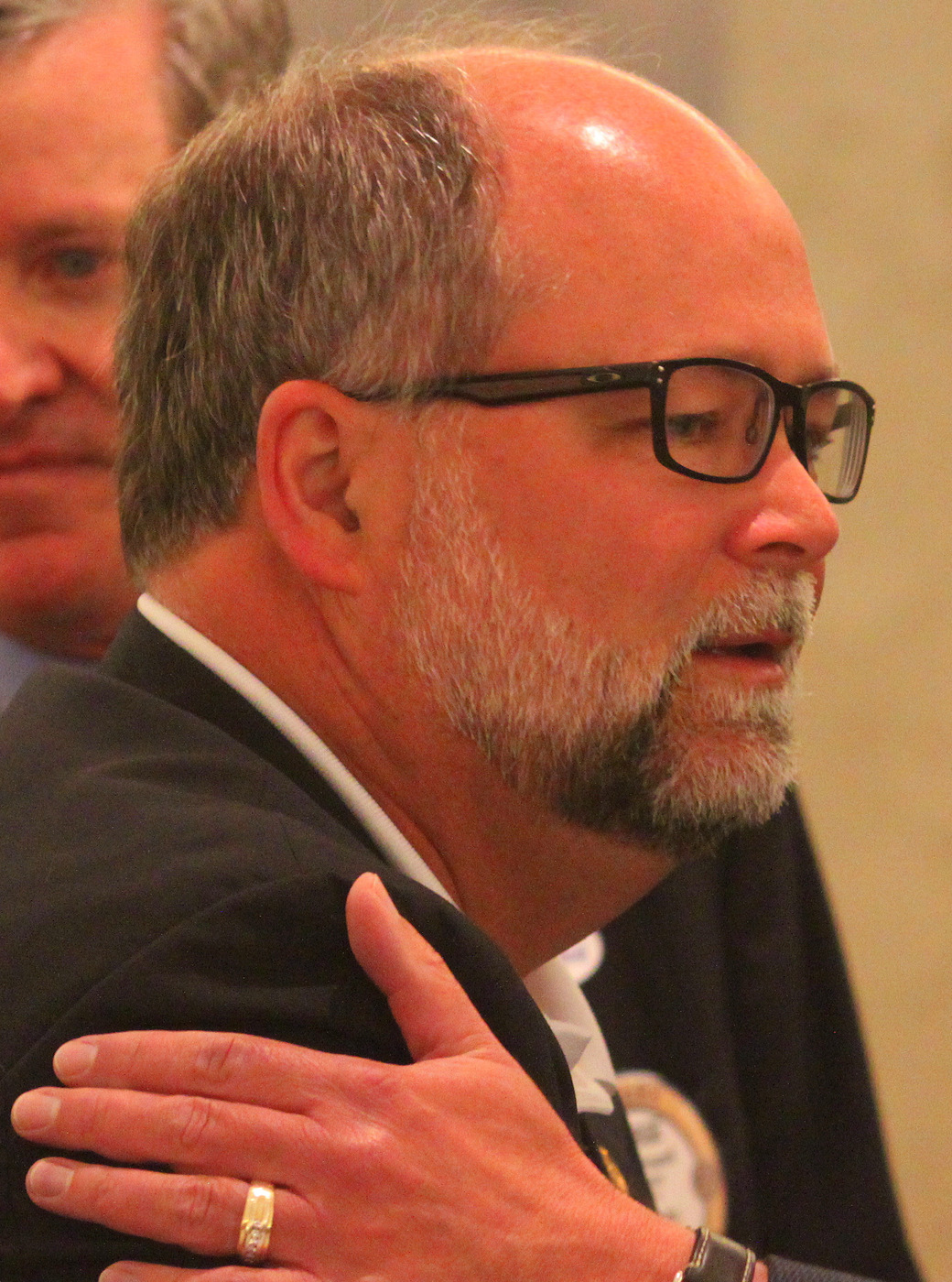

	Majority party	Minority party
Leader	Arlan Meekhof (term-limited)	Jim Ananich
Party	Republican	Democratic
Leader since	January 14, 2015	January 14, 2015
Leader's seat	30th District	27th District
Last election	26	12
Seats before	27	11
Seats after	22	16
Seat change	▼5	▲5
Popular vote	1,973,098	2,064,029
Percentage	48.04%	50.25%
Swing	▼3.18%	▲2.23%
- Results: Democratic hold Democratic gain Republican hold
Majority Leader before election
Arlan Meekhof
Republican
Elected Majority Leader
Mike Shirkey
Republican

The Michigan Senate elections of 2018 took place on November 6, 2018, alongside elections for Michigan's governor, Class I United States Senator, attorney general, and secretary of state, as well as elections for Michigan's 14 seats in the United States House of Representatives and all 110 seats in the Michigan House of Representatives, to elect the 38 members that would comprise the Michigan Senate. The Republican, Democratic, and Libertarian parties chose their nominees in a partisan primary on August 7, 2018. The Working Class Party, U.S. Taxpayers Party, Green Party, and Natural Law Party chose their nominees at state party conventions.

== Term-limited members ==
Under the Michigan Constitution, members of the state senate may serve only two four-year terms, and members of the House of Representatives are limited to three two-year terms. Michigan has what are considered the toughest term limits in the country. After the 2018 midterm elections, nearly 70 percent of the state Senate and 20 percent of the state House would be forced to leave office because of term limits. The following members are prevented by term limits from seeking re-election to the Senate in 2018. This list does not include members that are eligible for re-election, but instead chose to seek other office or to retire.

=== Democrats (7) ===
- 1st District: Coleman Young II
- 2nd District: Bert Johnson
- 3rd District: Morris Hood III
- 6th District: Hoon-Yung Hopgood
- 9th District: Steve Bieda
- 11th District: Vincent Gregory
- 18th District: Rebekah Warren

=== Republicans (19) ===
- 7th District: Patrick Colbeck
- 8th District: Jack Brandenburg
- 10th District: Tory Rocca
- 12th District: Jim Marleau
- 14th District: David B. Robertson
- 15th District: Mike Kowall
- 19th District: Mike Nofs
- 21st District: John Proos
- 22nd District: Joe Hune
- 24th District: Rick Jones
- 25th District: Phil Pavlov
- 26th District: Tonya Schuitmaker
- 29th District: Dave Hildenbrand
- 30th District: Arlan Meekhof
- 31st District: Mike Green
- 33rd District: Judy Emmons
- 34th District: Goeff Hansen
- 35th District: Darwin L. Booher
- 38th District: Tom Casperson

== Results ==
Popular vote
Democratic	50.25%
Republican	48.04%
Other	1.71%

Senate seats
Republican	57.89%
Democratic	42.10%

=== Closest races ===
Seats where the margin of victory was under 10%:

1. District 12, 0.78% (gain)
2. District 13, 2.78% (gain)
3. District 7, 3.22% (gain)
4. District 15, 3.38%
5. District 34, 4.41%
6. District 10, 4.79%

== Predictions ==
Source	Ranking	As of
Governing	Likely R	October 8, 2018

== General election ==
Pending official certification by the Michigan Board of State Canvassers, the following candidates, listed alphabetically, advanced to the November general election.

^{2}	Current member of House
^{3}	Former legislator

=== District 1 ===
1st District
Party	Candidate	Votes	%
Democratic	Stephanie Chang^{2}	60,874	72.27%
Republican	Pauline Montie	20,154	23.93%
Green	David Bullock	3,204	3.80%
Total votes		261,214	100%
Democratic hold			

=== District 2 ===
2nd District
Party	Candidate	Votes	%
Democratic	Adam Hollier	53,920	75.71%
Republican	Lisa Papas	17,288	24.29%
Total votes		71,208	100%
Democratic hold			

=== District 3 ===
3rd District
Party	Candidate	Votes	%
Democratic	Sylvia Santana^{2}	58,211	81.75%
Republican	Kathy Stecker	10,907	15.32%
Working Class	Hali McEachern	2,089	2.93%
Total votes		71,207	100%
Democratic hold			

=== District 4 ===
4th District
Party	Candidate	Votes	%
Democratic	Marshall Bullock	57,469	78.36%
Republican	Angela Savino	15,868	21.64%
Total votes		73,337	100%
Democratic hold			

=== District 5 ===
5th District
Party	Candidate	Votes	%
Democratic	Betty Jean Alexander	69,203	77.65%
Republican	DeShawn Wilkins	16,044	18.00%
Working Class	Larry Betts	3,879	4.35%
Total votes		89,126	100%
Democratic hold			

=== District 6 ===
6th District
Party	Candidate	Votes	%
Democratic	Erika Geiss^{2}	60,783	61.34%
Republican	Brenda Jones	38,301	38.66%
Total votes		99,084	100%
Democratic hold			

=== District 7 ===
7th District
Party	Candidate	Votes	%
Democratic	Dayna Polehanki	69,428	50.56%
Republican	Laura Cox^{2}	65,009	47.34%
Libertarian	Joseph H. LeBlanc	2,890	2.10%
Total votes		137,327	100%
Democratic gain from Republican			

=== District 8 ===
8th District
Party	Candidate	Votes	%
Republican	Peter Lucido^{2}	76,165	61.76%
Democratic	Paul R. Francis	47,151	38.24%
Total votes		123,316	100%
Republican hold			

=== District 9 ===
9th District
Party	Candidate	Votes	%
Democratic	Paul Wojno^{3}	65,730	65.90%
Republican	Jeff Bonnell	34,012	34.10%
Total votes		99,742	100%
Democratic hold			

=== District 10 ===
10th District
Party	Candidate	Votes	%
Republican	Michael D. MacDonald	57,565	51.02%
Democratic	Henry Yanez^{2}	52,392	46.43%
Libertarian	Mike Saliba	2,874	2.55%
Total votes		112,831	100%
Republican hold			

=== District 11 ===
11th District
Party	Candidate	Votes	%
Democratic	Jeremy Moss^{2}	97,192	76.43%
Republican	Boris Tuman	26,829	21.10%
Libertarian	James K. Young	3,145	2.47%
Total votes		127,166	100%
Democratic hold			

=== District 12 ===
12th District
Party	Candidate	Votes	%
Democratic	Rosemary Bayer	59,297	49.39%
Republican	Mike McCready^{2}	58,362	48.61%
Libertarian	Jeff Pittel	2,403	2.00%
Total votes		120,062	100%
Democratic gain from Republican			

=== District 13 ===
13th District
Party	Candidate	Votes	%
Democratic	Mallory McMorrow	73,138	51.89%
Republican	Marty Knollenberg (incumbent)	67,798	48.11%
Total votes		140,936	100%
Democratic gain from Republican			

=== District 14 ===
14th District
Party	Candidate	Votes	%
Republican	Ruth Johnson^{3}	64,273	55.68%
Democratic	Renee Watson	48,580	42.09%
Green	Jessica Smith	2,580	2.24%
Total votes		115,433	100%
Republican hold			

=== District 15 ===
15th District
Party	Candidate	Votes	%
Republican	Jim Runestad^{2}	67,351	51.69%
Democratic	Julia Pulver	62,935	48.31%
Total votes		130,286	100%
Republican hold			

=== District 16 ===
16th District
Party	Candidate	Votes	%
Republican	Mike Shirkey^{1}	56,981	62.71%
Democratic	Val Cochran Toops	31,129	34.26%
Libertarian	Ronald A. Muszynski	2,760	3.04%
Total votes		90,870	100%
Republican hold			

=== District 17 ===
17th District
Party	Candidate	Votes	%
Republican	Dale Zorn (incumbent)	57,947	57.89%
Democratic	Bill LaVoy^{3}	39,255	39.21%
Libertarian	Chad McNamara	2,905	2.90%
Total votes		100,107	100%
Republican hold			

=== District 18 ===
18th District
Party	Candidate	Votes	%
Democratic	Jeff Irwin^{3}	96,876	76.61%
Republican	Martin Church	26,619	21.05%
Working Class	Thomas Repasky	2,954	2.34%
Total votes		126,449	100%
Democratic hold			

=== District 19 ===
19th District
Party	Candidate	Votes	%
Republican	John Bizon^{2}	56,213	58.41%
Democratic	Jason Noble	37,081	38.53%
Libertarian	Joseph P. Gillotte	2,941	3.06%
Total votes		96,235	100%
Republican hold			

=== District 20 ===
20th District
Party	Candidate	Votes	%
Democratic	Sean McCann^{3}	60,523	53.09%
Republican	Margaret O'Brien (incumbent)	48,197	42.28%
Libertarian	Lorence Wenke^{3}	5,273	4.63%
Total votes		113,993	100%
Democratic gain from Republican			

=== District 21 ===
21st District
Party	Candidate	Votes	%
Republican	Kim LaSata^{2}	56,296	58.20%
Democratic	Ian Haight	40,433	41.80%
Total votes		96,729	100%
Republican hold			

=== District 22 ===
22nd District
Party	Candidate	Votes	%
Republican	Lana Theis^{2}	76,038	55.97%
Democratic	Adam Dreher	57,163	42.08%
Green	Eric Borregard	2,658	1.96%
Total votes		135,859	100%
Republican hold			

=== District 23 ===
23rd District
Party	Candidate	Votes	%
Democratic	Curtis Hertel Jr. (incumbent)	73,184	68.46%
Republican	Andrea Pollock	33,718	31.54%
Total votes		106,902	100%
Democratic hold			

=== District 24 ===
24th District
Party	Candidate	Votes	%
Republican	Tom Barrett^{2}	66,969	53.53%
Democratic	Kelly Rossman-McKinney	54,350	43.45%
Libertarian	Katie Nepton	2,064	1.65%
Constitution	Matthew Shepard	1,711	1.37%
Total votes		125,094	100%
Republican hold			

=== District 25 ===
25th District
Party	Candidate	Votes	%
Republican	Dan Lauwers^{2}	66,926	63.96%
Democratic	Debbie Bourgois	37,715	36.04%
Total votes		104,641	100%
Republican hold			

=== District 26 ===
26th District
Party	Candidate	Votes	%
Republican	Aric Nesbitt^{3}	61,509	56.67%
Democratic	Garnet Lewis	43,495	40.08%
Libertarian	Erwin Haas	2,375	2.19%
Green	Robert M. Alway	1,153	1.06%
Total votes		108,532	100%
Republican hold			

=== District 27 ===
27th District
Party	Candidate	Votes	%
Democratic	Jim Ananich (incumbent)	59,108	71.17%
Republican	Donna Kekesis	23,942	28.83%
Total votes		83,050	100%
Democratic hold			

=== District 28 ===
28th District
Party	Candidate	Votes	%
Republican	Peter MacGregor (incumbent)	68,749	58.39%
Democratic	Craig Beach	45,937	39.01%
Libertarian	Nathan Hewer	3,059	2.60%
Total votes		117,745	100%
Republican hold			

=== District 29 ===
29th District
Party	Candidate	Votes	%
Democratic	Winnie Brinks^{2}	70,715	56.92%
Republican	Chris Afendoulis^{2}	50,225	40.43%
Libertarian	Robert VanNoller	1,840	1.48%
Working Class	Louis Palus	1,445	1.16%
Total votes		124,225	100%
Democratic gain from Republican			

=== District 30 ===
30th District
Party	Candidate	Votes	%
Republican	Roger Victory^{2}	79,323	63.25%
Democratic	Jeanette Schipper	42,904	34.21%
Libertarian	Mary Buzuma	3,189	2.54%
Total votes		125,416	100%
Republican hold			

=== District 31 ===
31st District
Party	Candidate	Votes	%
Republican	Kevin Daley^{3}	63,394	60.24%
Democratic	Cynthia A. Luczak	41,833	39.76%
Total votes		105,227	100%
Republican hold			

=== District 32 ===
32nd District
Party	Candidate	Votes	%
Republican	Kenneth Horn^{1}	62,375	55.48%
Democratic	Phil Phelps^{2}	50,058	44.52%
Total votes		112,433	100%
Republican hold			

=== District 33 ===
33rd District
Party	Candidate	Votes	%
Republican	Rick Outman^{3}	49,856	58.75%
Democratic	Mark Bignell	32,375	38.15%
Constitution	Christopher Comden	2,633	3.10%
Total votes		84,864	100%
Republican hold			

=== District 34 ===
34th District
Party	Candidate	Votes	%
Republican	Jon Bumstead^{3}	50,313	50.74%
Democratic	Poppy Sias-Hernandez	45,941	46.33%
Libertarian	Max Riekse	2,896	2.92%
Total votes		99,150	100%
Republican hold			

=== District 35 ===
35th District
Party	Candidate	Votes	%
Republican	Curt VanderWall^{2}	73,688	63.17%
Democratic	Mike Taillard	39,923	34.23%
Libertarian	Timothy Coon	3,031	2.60%
Total votes		116,642	100%
Republican hold			

=== District 36 ===
36th District
Party	Candidate	Votes	%
Republican	Jim Stamas (incumbent)	71,013	64.29%
Democratic	Joe Weir	39,440	35.71%
Total votes		110,453	100%
Republican hold			

=== District 37 ===
37th District
Party	Candidate	Votes	%
Republican	Wayne Schmidt (incumbent)	73,338	58.95%
Democratic	Jim Page	51,076	41.05%
Total votes		124,414	100%
Republican hold			

=== District 38 ===
Results by county McBroom: 50–60%; 60–70%; Dianda: 40–50%; 50–60%

Results by precinct McBroom: 40–50%; 50–60%; 60–70%; 70–80%; 80–90%; Dianda: 40–50%; 50–60%; 60–70%; 70–80%

38th District
Party	Candidate	Votes	%
Republican	Ed McBroom^{3}	59,290	54.63%
Democratic	Scott Dianda^{2}	47,279	43.57%
Green	Wade Paul Roberts	1,952	1.80%
Total votes		108,521	100%
Republican hold			

=== Maps ===
Results shaded by the percentage of the party vote in each district

Support for Republican Party candidates by district

Support for Democratic Party candidates by district

== See also ==
- Michigan House of Representatives election, 2018
