= 2026 Michigan State University Board of Trustees election =

- November 3, 2026

2 of 8 seats on the Michigan State University Board of Trustees 5 seats needed for a majority
	First party	Second party
Party	Democratic	Republican
Seats before	7	1
Seats after	7	1
Seat change	Steady	Steady

The 2026 Michigan State University Board of Trustees election took place on November 3, 2026, to elect two of eight members to the Michigan State University Board of Trustees. Parties nominate candidates through conventions instead of in primary elections. Candidates are elected through plurality block voting.

== Democratic convention ==
=== Candidates ===
==== Nominees ====
- Brianna Scott, incumbent trustee (2019–present)
- Kelly Tebay Zemke, incumbent trustee (2019–present)

==== Eliminated at convention ====
- Sylvia Santana, state senator from the 2nd district (2019–present)

=== Endorsements ===
Brianna Scott

Statewide officials

- Gretchen Whitmer, governor of Michigan (2019–present)

Political parties

- Michigan Democratic Party
Kelly Tebay

Statewide officials

- Gretchen Whitmer, governor of Michigan (2019–present)

Political parties

- Michigan Democratic Party

== Republican convention ==
=== Candidates ===
==== Nominees ====
- Julie Maday, former Novi city councilor and nominee in 2024
- Roger Victory, state senator from the 31st district (2019–present)

=== Endorsements ===
Julie Maday

Political parties

- Michigan Republican Party
Roger Victory

Political parties

- Michigan Republican Party

== Third-party candidates ==
=== Libertarian Party ===
==== Nominees ====
- Daniel Patterson, former Democratic Arizona state representative for the 29th district (2009–2012)
- Will White, 2020 nominee for trustee and 2014 nominee for Michigan's 4th congressional district

=== Green Party ===
==== Nominee ====
- John Anthony La Pietra, perennial candidate

=== U.S. Taxpayers Party ===
==== Nominees ====
- Janet Sanger, perennial candidate
- John Sanger, perennial candidate

=== Working Class Party ===
==== Nominee ====
- Yaz Ozbek

== General election ==
=== Results ===
2026 Michigan State University Board of Trustees election results (vote for not more than 2)
Party	Candidate	Votes	%
Democratic	Brianna Scott (incumbent)	2,355,028	26.72
Democratic	Kelly Tebay Zemke (incumbent)	2,253,674	25.56
Republican	Julie Maday	1,940,882	22.02
Republican	Roger Victory	1,935,542	21.96
Libertarian	Daniel Patterson	75,912	0.86
Working Class	Yaz Ozbek	60,265	0.68
Libertarian	Will White	55,579	0.63
U.S. Taxpayers	Janet Sanger	55,153	0.63
U.S. Taxpayers	John Sanger	41,689	0.47
Green	John Anthony La Pietra	41,085	0.47
Total votes		8,814,809	100.0
Democratic hold			
Democratic hold			
