= Michigan's 20th Senate district =

American legislative district

Michigan's 20th State Senate district
Senator
Aric Nesbitt; R–Lawton
- Demographics: 74.5% White; 8.6% Black; 9.4% Hispanic; 2% Asian; 0.2% Native American; 0.3% Other; 4.9% Multiracial
- Population (2024): 264,353

Michigan's 20th Senate district is one of 38 districts in the Michigan Senate. The 20th district was created by the 1850 Michigan Constitution, as the 1835 constitution only permitted a maximum of eight senate districts. It has been represented by Republican Aric Nesbitt since 2023, succeeding Democrat Sean McCann.

== Geography ==
District 20 encompasses parts of Allegan, Berrien, Kent, and Van Buren counties.

=== 2011 Apportionment Plan ===
District 20, as dictated by the 2011 Apportionment Plan, was exactly coterminous with Kalamazoo County, including the city of Kalamazoo and the surrounding communities of Portage, Comstock Northwest, Eastwood, Westwood, Vicksburg, Kalamazoo Township, Oshtemo Township, Texas Township, Comstock Township, and Cooper Township.

The district was located entirely within Michigan's 6th congressional district, and overlapped with the 60th, 61st, 63rd, and 66th districts of the Michigan House of Representatives.

== List of senators ==
Senator	Party	Dates	Residence	Notes
Fitz H. Stevens	Democratic	1853–1854	Paw Paw	
Lyman A. Fitch	Republican	1855–1856	Mattawan	
Lafayette W. Lovell	Republican	1857–1858	Climax	
John Parker	Republican	1859–1860	Portage	
Stephen F. Brown	Republican	1861–1862	Schoolcraft	
Elijah O. Humphrey	Republican	1863–1864	Kalamazoo	
Stephen F. Brown	Republican	1865–1866	Schoolcraft	
Albertus L. Green	Republican	1867–1868	Olivet	
George Thomas	Republican	1869–1870	Barry County	
Homer G. Barber	Republican	1871–1872	Vermontville	
Mark S. Brewer	Republican	1873–1874	Pontiac	
Charles V. Babcock	Democratic	1875–1876	Southfield	
William Jenney	Republican	1877–1878	Mount Clemens	
Joseph B. Moore	Republican	1879–1880	Lapeer	
John T. Rich	Republican	1881	Elba	Resigned to run for the U. S. House of Representatives.
William W. Andrus	Republican	1881–1882	Utica	
Alonzo T. Frisbee	Greenback	1883–1884	Oak Grove	
Henry H. Pulver	Democratic	1885–1886	Laingsburg	Elected on a fusion ticket in 1884, backed by both the Democrats and the Greenback Party.
George P. Stark	Democratic	1887–1888	Cascade	Elected on a fusion ticket in 1886, backed by both the Democrats and the Greenback Party.
Sybrant Wesselius	Republican	1889–1890	Grand Rapids	
Peter Doran	Democratic	1891–1892	Grand Rapids	
Charles H. McGinley	Republican	1893–1894	Minden City	
Joseph Moss Gaige	Republican	1895–1896	Croswell	
Matthew D. Wagner	Republican	1897–1900	Sand Beach	
Albert E. Sleeper	Republican	1901–1904	Lexington	
Bela W. Jenks	Republican	1905–1908	Harbor Beach	
William H. Aitkin	Republican	1909–1910	Croswell	
Charles G. Putney	Republican	1911–1912	Sandusky	
Frederick L. Woodworth	Republican	1913–1916	Caseville	
George B. Forrester	Republican	1917–1922	Deckerville	
Godfried Gettel	Republican	1923–1926	Sebewaing	
Philip O'Connell	Republican	1927–1930	McGregor	
Herbert P. Orr	Republican	1931–1934	Caro	
Samuel H. Pangborn	Republican	1935–1938	Bad Axe	
Leonard J. Paterson	Republican	1939–1942	Sandusky	
Audley Rawson	Republican	1943–1946	Cass City	
Edwin W. Klump	Republican	1947–1950	Harbor Beach	
Alpheus P. Decker	Republican	1951–1954	Deckerville	
Arthur A. Dehmel	Republican	1955–1964	Unionville	
Roger Johnson	Democratic	1965–1966	Marshall	
Harry A. DeMaso	Republican	1967–1986	Battle Creek	
Joe Schwarz	Republican	1987–1994	Battle Creek	
Harry Gast	Republican	1995–2002	St. Joseph	
Tom George	Republican	2003–2010	Texas Township	Lived in Kalamazoo until around 2009.
Tonya Schuitmaker	Republican	2011–2014	Lawton	
Margaret O'Brien	Republican	2015–2018	Portage	
Sean McCann	Democratic	2019–2022	Kalamazoo	
Aric Nesbitt	Republican	2023–present	Lawton	Lived in Porter Township until around 2023.
Chris Moraitis	Republican	(Note: Member-elect.)		

== Recent election results ==
=== 2020s ===
2026 Michigan Senate election
Primary election
Party	Candidate	Votes	%
Republican	Chris Moraitis	12,716	42.59
Republican	Kenny Clevenger	12,527	41.96
Republican	Curtis Clark	4,611	15.45
Total votes		29,854	100
Democratic	Dale Murney	26,946	100
Total votes		26,946	100
General election
Republican	Chris Moraitis	67,856	55.19
Democratic	Dale Murney	53,554	43.56
Green	Shamara Clay	1,540	1.25
Total votes		122,950	100
Republican hold			

2022 Michigan Senate election, District 20
Primary election
Party	Candidate	Votes	%
Republican	Aric Nesbitt (incumbent)	24,691	67.2
Republican	Austin Kreutz	7,853	21.4
Republican	Kaleb M. Hudson	4,172	11.4
Total votes		36,716	100
General election
Republican	Aric Nesbitt (incumbent)	69,316	61.0
Democratic	Kim Jorgensen Gane	44,403	39.0
Total votes		113,719	100
Republican gain from Democratic			

=== 2018 ===
2018 Michigan Senate election, District 20
Party	Candidate	Votes	%
Democratic	Sean McCann	60,528	53.1
Republican	Margaret O'Brien (incumbent)	48,195	42.3
Libertarian	Lorence Wenke	5,274	4.6
Total votes		113,997	100
Democratic gain from Republican			

=== 2014 ===
2014 Michigan Senate election, District 20
Primary election
Party	Candidate	Votes	%
Republican	Margaret O'Brien	11,342	77.4
Republican	Ron Zuiderveen	3,308	22.6
Total votes		14,650	100
General election
Republican	Margaret O'Brien	36,630	45.5
Democratic	Sean McCann	36,571	45.5
Libertarian	Lorence Wenke	7,263	9.0
Total votes		80,464	100
Republican hold			

=== Federal and statewide results ===
Year	Office	Results
2020	President	Biden 58.3 – 39.6%
2018	Senate	Stabenow 57.3 – 40.3%
2018	Governor	Whitmer 58.4 – 38.5%
2016	President	Clinton 53.3 – 40.5%
2014	Senate	Peters 54.1 – 40.7%
2014	Governor	Snyder 51.0 – 46.2%
2012	President	Obama 56.2 – 42.9%
2012	Senate	Stabenow 57.1 – 39.4%

== Historical district boundaries ==
Map	Description	Apportionment Plan	Notes
	Barry County (part); Assyria Township; Baltimore Township; Castleton Township; Hastings; Hastings Township; Johnstown Township; Maple Grove Township; Woodland Township; Branch County; Calhoun County; Eaton County (part); Bellevue Township; Brookfield Township; Carmel Township; Kalamo Township; Olivet; Vermontville Township; Walton Township; Hillsdale County (part); Camden Township; Reading; Reading Township; Woodbridge Township	1964 Apportionment Plan	
	Barry County (part); Assyria Township; Baltimore Township; Barry Township; Carlton Township; Hastings Township; Hope Township; Irving Township; Johnstown Township; Orangeville Township; Rutland Township; Woodland Township; Yankee Springs Township; Branch County; Calhoun County (part); Excluding; Lee Township; Hillsdale County (part); Allen Township; Litchfield Township; Reading; Reading Township; Jackson County (part); Pulaski Township; Kalamazoo County (part); Charleston Township; St. Joseph County (part); Burr Oak Township; Colon Township; Fawn River Township; Leonidas Township; Sturgis	1972 Apportionment Plan	
	Calhoun County; Eaton County; Ingham County (part); Delhi Township	1982 Apportionment Plan	
	Berrien County; Cass County; St. Joseph County (part); Burr Oak Township; Colon Township; Constantine Township; Fabius Township; Fawn River Township; Florence Township; Flowerfield Township; Leonidas Township; Lockport Township; Mottville Township; Nottawa Township; Sherman Township; Sturgis; Sturgis Township; Three Rivers; White Pigeon Township	1992 Apportionment Plan	
	Kalamazoo County; Van Buren County (part); Antwerp Township; Paw Paw Township	2001 Apportionment Plan	
	Kalamazoo County	2011 Apportionment Plan	
