= Michigan's 31st Senate district =

American legislative district

Michigan's 31st State Senate district
Senator
Roger Victory; R–Hudsonville
- Demographics: 80.4% White; 1.5% Black; 11.5% Hispanic; 2.9% Asian; 0.1% Native American; 0.4% Other; 3.1% Multiracial
- Population (2024): 269,589

Michigan's 31st Senate district is one of 38 districts in the Michigan Senate. The 31st district was created by the 1850 Michigan Constitution, as the 1835 constitution only permitted a maximum of eight senate districts. It has been represented by Republican Roger Victory since 2023, succeeding fellow Republican Kevin Daley.

== Geography ==
District 31 encompasses parts of Allegan and Ottawa counties.

=== 2011 Apportionment Plan ===
District 31, as dictated by the 2011 Apportionment Plan, covered all of Bay, Lapeer, and Tuscola Counties along Saginaw Bay, including the communities of Bay City, Essexville, Caro, Vassar, Lapeer, Imlay City, Almont, Bangor Township, Monitor Township, and Hampton Township.

The district was exactly split between Michigan's 5th and 10th congressional districts, and overlapped with the 82nd, 84th, 96th, and 98th districts of the Michigan House of Representatives.

== List of senators ==
Senator	Party	Dates	Residence	Notes
Daniel B. Harrington	Democratic	1853–1854	Port Huron	
Omar D. Conger	Republican	1855–1856	Port Huron	
Thomas W. Ferry	Republican	1857–1858	Grand Haven	
Henry Pennoyer	Democratic	1859–1860	Grand Haven	
Nelson Green	Republican	1861–1862	White River	
Charles Mears	Republican	1863–1864	Mason County	
James B. Walker	Republican	1865–1866	Benzonia	
John H. Standish	Republican	1867–1870	Newaygo	
Seth C. Moffatt	Republican	1871–1872	Northport	
William H. C. Mitchell	Republican	1873–1876	East Traverse Bay	
Edward Breitung	Republican	1877–1878	Negaunee	
Samuel M. Stephenson	Republican	1879–1880	Menominee	
William F. Swift	Republican	1881–1882	Ishpeming	
Henry W. Seymour	Republican	1883–1884	Sault St. Marie	
Samuel M. Stephenson	Republican	1885–1886	Menominee	
William S. Laing	Republican	1887–1888	Iron Mountain	
Clinton G. Griffey	Republican	1889–1890	Negaunee	
Joseph Flesheim	Republican	1891–1892	Menominee	
Peter Pascoe	Republican	1893–1896	Republic	
Alexander Maitland	Republican	1897–1900	Negaunee	
Gad Smith	Republican	1901–1902	Marquette	
Michael H. Moriarty	Republican	1903–1912	Crystal Falls	
Charles T. Winegar	Progressive	1913–1914	Iron Mountain	
Alton T. Roberts	Republican	1915–1918	Marquette	
Frank H. Vandenboom	Republican	1919–1922	Marquette	
Walter F. Truettner	Republican	1923–1928	Bessemer	
Charles W. Richardson	Republican	1929–1932	Marquette	
Ray Derham	Republican	1933–1934	Iron Mountain	
John C. Wickstrom	Democratic	1935–1938	Norway	
D. Stephen Benzie	Democratic	1939–1942	Norway	
Joseph P. Cloon	Republican	1943–1944	Wakefield	
Alvin C. Hampton	Democratic	1945–1946	Negaunee	
Joseph P. Cloon	Republican	1947–1948	Wakefield	
Albert J. Wilke	Democratic	1949–1950	Iron Mountain	
Joseph P. Cloon	Republican	1951–1954	Wakefield	
Philip Rahoi	Democratic	1955–1964	Iron Mountain	
Robert VanderLaan	Republican	1965–1982	Grand Rapids	
Dick Posthumus	Republican	1983–1998	Alto	Lived in Lowell from around 1983 to 1988.
Ken Sikkema	Republican	1999–2002	Grandville	
Jim Barcia	Democratic	2003–2010	Bay City	
Mike Green	Republican	2011–2018	Mayville	
Kevin Daley	Republican	2019–2022	Lum	
Roger Victory	Republican	2023–present	Hudsonville	Lived in Georgetown Township until around 2023.

== Recent election results ==
=== 2020s ===
2026 Michigan Senate election
Primary election
Party	Candidate	Votes	%
General election
Republican	John Wetzel	82,118	57.73
Democratic	Chris Kleinjans	60,133	42.27
Total votes		142,251	100
Republican hold			

2022 Michigan Senate election, District 31
Primary election
Party	Candidate	Votes	%
Republican	Roger Victory (Incumbent)	33,205	66.2
Republican	Brian VanDussen	16,974	33.8
Total votes		50,179	100
Democratic	Kim S. Nagy	14,454	100
Total votes		14,454	100
General election
Republican	Roger Victory (Incumbent)	82,383	62.1
Democratic	Kim S. Nagy	47,413	35.8
Libertarian	Jessica L. Fox	2,845	2.1
Total votes		132,641	100
Republican hold			

=== 2018 ===
2018 Michigan Senate election, District 31
Primary election
Party	Candidate	Votes	%
Republican	Kevin Daley	18,548	58.5
Republican	Gary Glenn	13,154	41.5
Total votes		31,702	100
Democratic	Cynthia Luczak	11,511	53.7
Democratic	Bill Jordan	4,290	20.0
Democratic	Chuck Stadler	2,826	13.2
Democratic	Joni Batterbee	2,789	13.0
Total votes		21,416	100
General election
Republican	Kevin Daley	63,394	60.2
Democratic	Cynthia Luczak	41,833	39.8
Total votes		105,227	100
Republican hold			

=== 2014 ===
2014 Michigan Senate election, District 31
Primary election
Party	Candidate	Votes	%
Republican	Mike Green (incumbent)	10,645	49.6
Republican	Kevin Daley	9,873	46.0
Republican	Jeffery Phillips	964	4.5
Total votes		21,482	100
General election
Republican	Mike Green (incumbent)	45,699	54.5
Democratic	Ron Mindykowski	38,086	45.5
Total votes		83,745	100
Republican hold			

=== Federal and statewide results ===
Year	Office	Results
2020	President	Trump 62.4 – 35.9%
2018	Senate	James 56.0 – 41.8%
2018	Governor	Schuette 53.9 – 42.7%
2016	President	Trump 61.0 – 33.8%
2014	Senate	Peters 51.4 – 43.6%
2014	Governor	Snyder 52.2 – 44.9%
2012	President	Romney 51.4 – 47.5%
2012	Senate	Stabenow 56.3 – 40.1%

== Historical district boundaries ==
Map	Description	Apportionment Plan	Notes
	Ionia County; Kent County (part); Ada Township; Algoma Township; Bowne Township; Byron Township; Caledonia Township; Cannon Township; Cascade Township; Cedar Springs; Courtland Township; East Grand Rapids; Gaines Township; Grand Rapids (part); Grand Rapids Township; Grattan Township; Lowell; Lowell Township; Nelson Township; Oakfield Township; Paris Township; Plainfield Township; Rockford; Solon Township; Sparta Township; Spencer Township; Tyrone Township; Vergennes Township; Wyoming; Montcalm County (part); Maple Valley Township; Pierson Township; Reynolds Township; Newaygo County (part); Croton Township; Ensley Township	1964 Apportionment Plan	
	Barry County (part); Thornapple Township; Eaton County (part); Sunfield Township; Ionia County; Kent County (part); Ada Township; Algoma Township; Bowne Township; Byron Township; Caledonia Township; Cannon Township; Cascade Township; Cedar Springs; Courtland Township; East Grand Rapids; Gaines Township; Grand Rapids (part); Grand Rapids Township; Grattan Township; Kentwood; Lowell; Lowell Township; Nelson Township; Oakfield Township; Rockford; Solon Township; Sparta Township; Spencer Township; Tyrone Township; Vergennes Township; Montcalm County (part); Bloomer Township; Bushnell Township; Carson City; Eureka Township; Fairplain Township; Greenville; Montcalm Township (part); Sidney Township (part)	1972 Apportionment Plan	
	Kent County (part); Algoma Township; Alpine Township; Bowne Township; Byron Township; Caledonia Township; Cascade Township; Cedar Springs; Courtland Township (part); Gaines Township; Grandville; Kentwood; Lowell; Lowell Township; Nelson Township; Plainfield Township; Rockford; Solon Township; Sparta Township; Spencer Township; Tyrone Township; Walker; Wyoming; Ottawa County (part); Jamestown Township	1982 Apportionment Plan	
	Kent County (part); Ada Township; Algoma Township; Bowne Township; Byron Township; Caledonia Township; Cannon Township; Cascade Township; Cedar Springs; Courtland Township; East Grand Rapids; Gaines Township; Grand Rapids Charter Township; Grandville; Grattan Township; Kentwood; Lowell; Lowell Township; Nelson Township; Oakfield Township; Rockford; Solon Township; Spencer Township; Tyrone Township; Vergennes Township; Vergennes Township	1992 Apportionment Plan	
	Arenac County; Bay County; Huron County; Sanilac County; Tuscola County	2001 Apportionment Plan	
	Bay County; Lapeer County; Tuscola County	2011 Apportionment Plan	
