= Bela W. Jenks (born 1849) =

American politician (1849–1930)

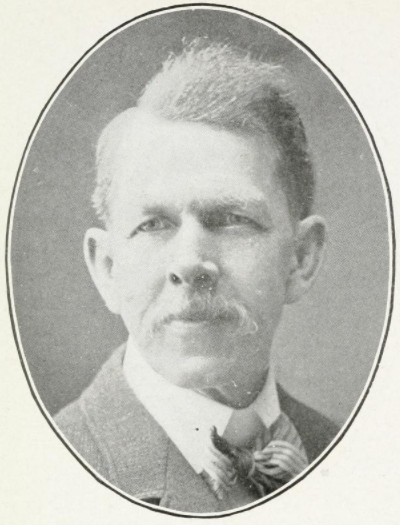

Member of the Michigan Senate from the 20th district
- In office January 1, 1905 – 1908
- Preceded by: Albert Sleeper
- Succeeded by: Frederick L. Woodworth

Personal details
- Born: July 18, 1849 Schroon Lake, New York
- Died: 1930 (aged 80-81)
- Party: Republican
- Spouse: Alma Stafford

Bela Whipple Jenks (July 18, 1849 – 1930) was a Michigan politician.

== Early life ==
Jenks was born on July 18, 1849, in Schroon Lake, New York, to parents Jesse L. and Mary Jane Jenks. Jenks was of Welsh ancestry. His family later moved to St. Clair, Michigan.

== Career ==
On November 8, 1904, Jenks was elected to the Michigan Senate where he represented the 20th district from January 4, 1905, to 1908. Jenks was a member of the Michigan Republican State Central Committee in 1911.

== Personal life ==
Jenks married Alma "Allie" Stafford in Memphis, Michigan, on July 18, 1871. Together they had four children.

== Death ==
Jenks died in 1930.
