= Rebecca Amidon =

American politician

Member-elect of the Michigan Senate from the 32nd district
- Assuming office January 1, 2027
- Succeeding: Jon Bumstead

Personal details
- Party: Democratic

Rebecca Amidon is an American politician who is the member-elect for the 32nd district in the Michigan Senate. She was elected in the 2026 Michigan Senate election. She is a member of the Democratic Party.

== Career ==
Amidon has a bachelor's degree in media and public communication from Purdue University Fort Wayne and a master's degree in organizational leadership from Trine University. She is a professor at Mid Michigan College.

== Michigan Senate ==
In 2026, Amidon ran for Michigan's 32nd Senate district to succeed Republican Jon Bumstead, who was term-limited. A first-time candidate, she won the Democratic primary unopposed, facing Republican Kim Cole in the general election. She defeated Cole with 50.59% of the vote.

== Personal life ==
Amidon is married and has two children.

== Electoral history ==
2026 Michigan's 32nd Senate district election
Party	Candidate	Votes	%
Democratic	Rebecca Amidon	62,101	50.59
Republican	Kim Cole	60,646	49.41
Total votes		122,747	100.0
Democratic gain from Republican			
