= Chris Moraitis (Michigan politician) =

American politician

Member-elect of the Michigan Senate from the 20th district
- Assuming office January 1, 2027
- Succeeding: Aric Nesbitt

Personal details
- Party: Republican

Chris Moraitis is an American politician who is the member-elect for the 20th district in the Michigan Senate. He was elected in the 2026 Michigan Senate election. He is a member of the Republican Party.

== Michigan Senate ==
In 2026, Amidon ran for Michigan's 20th Senate district to succeed Republican Aric Nesbitt, who was term-limited. Moraitis faced fellow Republicans Kenny Clevenger and Curtis Clark in the primary. He narrowly won, receiving 42.59% of the vote to Clevenger's 41.96%. In the general election, he faced Democratic candidate Dale Murney, winning with 55% of the vote.

== Personal life ==
Moraitis lives in Paw Paw, Michigan.

== Electoral history ==
2026 Michigan's 20th Senate district Republican primary
Party	Candidate	Votes	%
Republican	Chris Moraitis	12,716	42.59
Republican	Kenny Clevenger	12,527	41.96
Republican	Curtis Clark	4,611	15.45
Total votes		29,854	100.00

2026 Michigan's 20th Senate district election
Party	Candidate	Votes	%
Republican	Chris Moraitis	67,856	55.19
Democratic	Dale Murney	53,554	43.56
Green	Shamara Clay	1,540	1.25
Total votes		122,950	100.00
Republican hold			
