= Albert J. Wilke =

American politician (1895–1977)

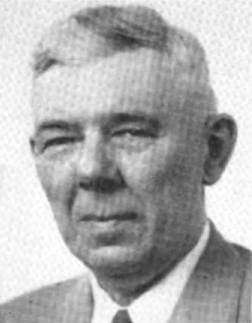
- Wilke in 1949

Member of the Michigan Senate from the 31st district
- In office 1949–1950
- Preceded by: Joseph P. Cloon
- Succeeded by: Joseph P. Cloon

Personal details
- Born: December 31, 1895 Port Washington, Wisconsin, U.S.
- Died: July 29, 1977 (aged 81) Iron Mountain, Michigan, U.S.
- Party: Democratic
- Profession: Politician

Albert J. Wilke (December 31, 1895 – July 29, 1977) was a member of the Michigan Senate.

== Biography ==
Wilke was born on December 31, 1895, in Port Washington, Wisconsin. He died on July 29, 1977, in Iron Mountain, Michigan.

== Career ==
Wilke was a member of the Senate from 1949 to 1950. Previously, he was Register of Deeds of Dickinson County, Michigan, from 1935 to 1946 and a delegate to the 1944 Democratic National Convention that nominated Franklin D. Roosevelt for a historic fourth term as President of the United States. He was an unsuccessful candidate in the general election for the Michigan House of Representatives in 1954 and in the Democratic primary in 1958.
