= John Wetzel (Michigan politician) =

American politician

Member-elect of the Michigan Senate from the 31st district
- Assuming office January 2027
- Succeeding: Roger Victory

Personal details
- Party: Republican

John Wetzel is an American politician. A member of the Republican Party, he is the member-elect for the 31st district of the Michigan Senate.
