= Mike Green (Michigan politician) =

American politician (1948–2024)

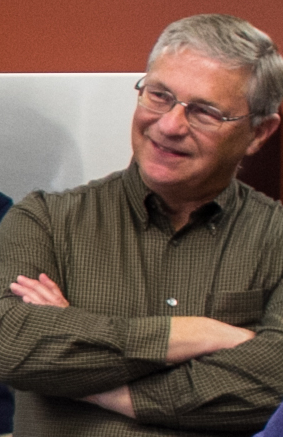

Member of the Michigan Senate from the 31st district
- In office January 1, 2011 – January 1, 2019
- Preceded by: Jim Barcia
- Succeeded by: Kevin Daley

Member of the Michigan House of Representatives from the 84th district
- In office January 1, 1995 – December 31, 2000
- Preceded by: Dick Allen
- Succeeded by: Tom Meyer

Personal details
- Born: September 28, 1948 Risco, Missouri, U.S.
- Died: March 28, 2024 (aged 75)
- Party: Republican
- Spouse: Paula
- Children: Five
- Education: Flint Junior College
- Profession: Tool and die maker

Michael L. Green (September 28, 1948 – March 28, 2024) was an American Republican politician from Michigan. He was a member of the State Senate, and was a member of the Michigan House of Representatives. Green was also a member of the Tuscola County Board of Commissioners, and was a tool and die maker at General Motors. He was the owner of Green's Custom Log Homes in Mayville.

Green died of cancer on March 28, 2024, at the age of 75.
