= Lowell Township, Michigan =

- Charter township
- Lowell Charter Township
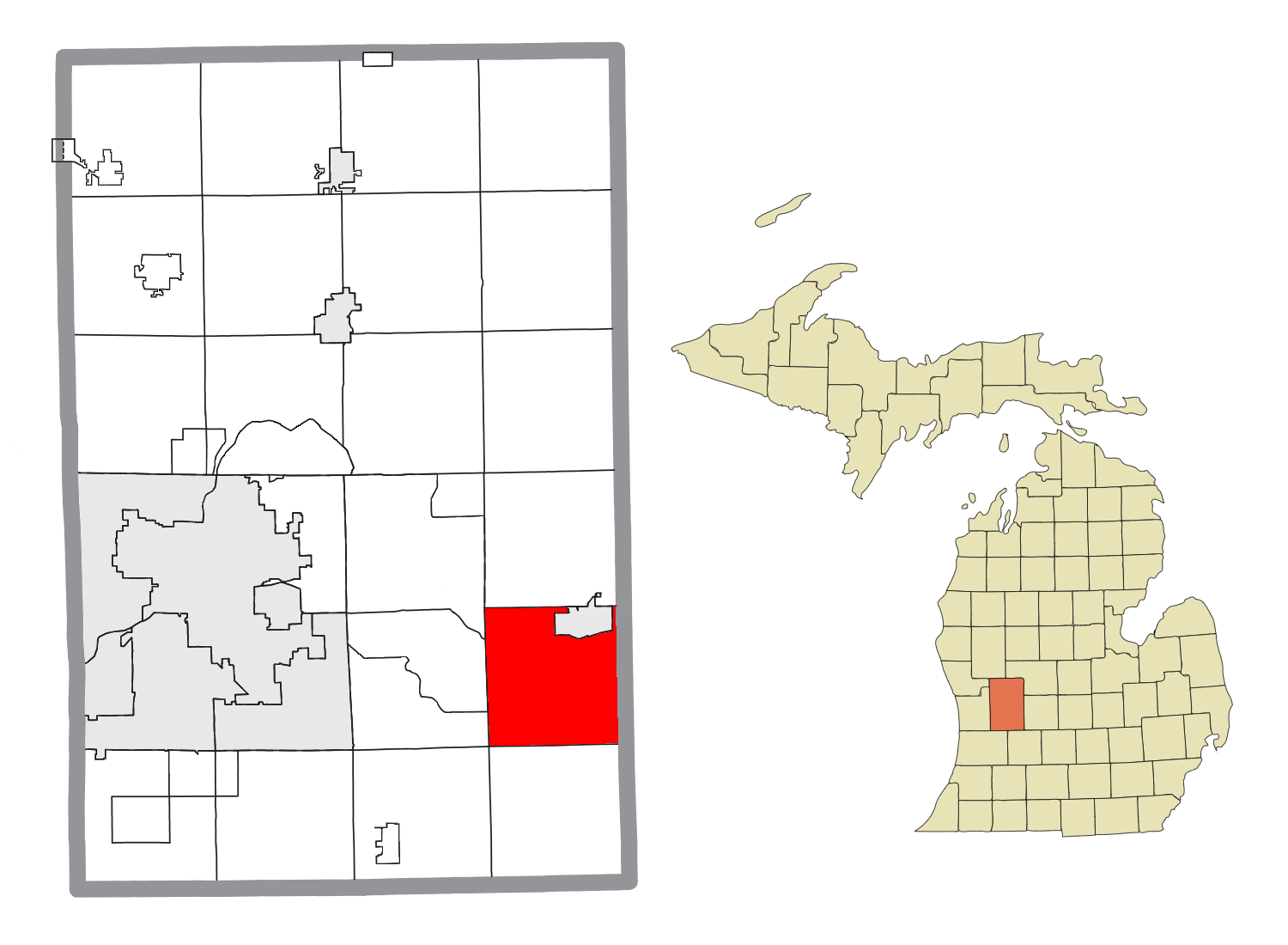
- Location within Kent County

- Location within the state of Michigan Location within the United States
- Coordinates: 42°54′20″N 85°21′49″W
- Country: United States
- State: Michigan
- County: Kent
- Established: 1848

Government
  - Supervisor: Jerry Hale
  - Clerk: Monica Burtt

Area
  - Total: 33.32 sq mi (86.30 km^{2})
  - Land: 32.57 sq mi (84.36 km^{2})
  - Water: 0.75 sq mi (1.94 km^{2})
- Elevation: 794 ft (242 m)

Population (2020)
  - Total: 6,276
  - Density: 192.7/sq mi (74.40/km^{2})
- Time zone: UTC-5 (Eastern (EST))
  - Summer (DST): UTC-4 (EDT)
- ZIP code(s): 49301 (Ada); 49302 (Alto); 49331 (Lowell)
- Area code: 616
- FIPS code: 26-081-49560
- GNIS feature ID: 1626645
- Website: Official website

Lowell Charter Township is a charter township of Kent County in the U.S. state of Michigan. The population was 6,276 at the 2020 census.

The city of Lowell is bordered on the north, but the two are administered autonomously. The township is part of the Grand Rapids metropolitan area and is located about 15 miles (24.1 km) east of the city of Grand Rapids.

== Geography ==
According to the U.S. Census Bureau, the township has a total area of 33.32 square miles (86.30 km^{2}), of which 32.57 square miles (84.36 km^{2}) is land and 0.75 square miles (1.94 km^{2}) (2.25%) is water.

The township is in southeastern Kent County and is bordered by Bowne Township to the south, Cascade Charter Township to the west, Ada Township to the northwest, Vergennes Township to the north, and Boston Township in Ionia County to the east.

The Grand River flows through the northern portion of the township.

=== Major highways ===
- I-96 runs west–east along the southern portion of the township.
- M-21 (Fulton Street) runs west–east through the northern portion of the township.

== Education ==
Lowell Township is served almost entirely by Lowell Area Schools, although a very small portion of the southwest corner of the township is served by Caledonia Community Schools.

== Demographics ==
As of the census of 2000, there were 5,219 people, 1,726 households, and 1,410 families residing in the township. The population density was 159.9 inhabitants per square mile (61.7/km^{2}). There were 1,764 housing units at an average density of 54.1 per square mile (20.9/km^{2}). The racial makeup of the township was 96.67% White, 0.82% African American, 0.40% Native American, 0.50% Asian, 0.54% from other races, and 1.07% from two or more races. Hispanic or Latino of any race were 1.72% of the population.

There were 1,726 households, out of which 43.5% had children under the age of 18 living with them, 69.2% were married couples living together, 9.1% had a female householder with no husband present, and 18.3% were non-families. 14.2% of all households were made up of individuals, and 4.3% had someone living alone who was 65 years of age or older. The average household size was 2.93 and the average family size was 3.25.

In the township the population was spread out, with 30.2% under the age of 18, 7.5% from 18 to 24, 30.8% from 25 to 44, 23.2% from 45 to 64, and 8.2% who were 65 years of age or older. The median age was 35 years. For every 100 females, there were 101.0 males. For every 100 females age 18 and over, there were 97.5 males.

The median income for a household in the township was $58,639, and the median income for a family was $65,395. Males had a median income of $46,774 versus $28,182 for females. The per capita income for the township was $22,560. About 2.1% of families and 3.0% of the population were below the poverty line, including 3.7% of those under age 18 and 8.1% of those age 65 or over.
