= Abbie Groff-Blaszak =

American politician

Member-elect of the Michigan Senate from the 29th district
- Assuming office January 2027
- Succeeding: Winnie Brinks

Personal details
- Party: Democratic
- Education: Indiana University Bloomington; Harvard Graduate School of Education

Abbie Groff-Blaszak is an American politician. A member of the Democratic Party, she is the member-elect for the 29th district of the Michigan Senate.

Groff-Blaszak attended the Indiana University Bloomington, earning her bachelor's degree in 2000. She also attended Harvard Graduate School of Education, earning her Master of Education degree in 2004.
