= Jason Hoskins =

American football coach (born c. 1983)

Current position
- Title: Head coach
- Team: Upper Iowa
- Conference: GLVC
- Record: 21–35

Biographical details
- Born: c. 1983 (age 42–43); Dubuque, Iowa, U.S.
- Education: Loras College (2005); University of Minnesota Duluth (2013)

Coaching career (HC unless noted)
- 2002: Loras (SA)
- 2003: Rockford (SA)
- 2004–2005: Loras (SA)
- 2006–2007: Minnesota Duluth (GA)
- 2008–2009: Southern Illinois (GA)
- 2010–2014: Northern State (DB)
- 2015–2017: Upper Iowa (DC/LB)
- 2018–2019: Upper Iowa (ST/DB)
- 2020–present: Upper Iowa

Head coaching record
- Overall: 21–35
- Bowls: 1–0

Jason Hoskins (born c. 1983) is an American college football coach. He is the head football coach for Upper Iowa University, a position he has held since 2021. He also coached for Loras, Rockford, Minnesota Duluth, Southern Illinois, and Northern State.

== Head coaching record ==
Year	Team	Overall	Conference	Standing	Bowl/playoffs
Upper Iowa Peacocks (Northern Sun Intercollegiate Conference) (2020–2022)
2020–21	No team—COVID-19				
2021	Upper Iowa	1–10	1–10	7th (South)	
2022	Upper Iowa	1–10	1–10	7th (South)	
Upper Iowa Peacocks (Great Lakes Valley Conference) (2023–present)
2023	Upper Iowa	3–8	1–6	T–7th	
2024	Upper Iowa	7–4	6–2	T–2nd	
2025	Upper Iowa	9–3	6–2	3rd	W Albanese Candy
Upper Iowa:		21–35	15–30		
Total:		21–35			
