= Small Business Association of Michigan =

Organization

The Small Business Association of Michigan (SBAM) is a non-profit association that consists of Michigan-based businesses with 500 or fewer employees. Founded in 1967 by Richard B. Sanford in Kalamazoo, Michigan, it is now headquartered in Lansing, United States. SBAM provides its members with political advocacy, group buying power of products and services, and promotion of entrepreneurship. SBAM also provides insurance to their members.

In 2024, SBAM filed suit against the federal government to block legislation that would require businesses to disclose their beneficial owners to the Treasury Department.
