= Kevin Daley (politician) =

American politician (born 1957)

Member of the Michigan Senate
- Incumbent
- Assumed office January 1, 2019
- Preceded by: Mike Green
- Constituency: 31st district (2019–2022); 26th district (2023– )

Member of the Michigan House of Representatives from the 82nd district
- In office January 1, 2009 – January 1, 2015
- Preceded by: John Stahl
- Succeeded by: Todd Courser

Personal details
- Born: August 10, 1957 (age 68)
- Party: Republican
- Spouse: Debbie
- Occupation: Farmer

Kevin Daley (born August 10, 1957) is an American politician in the state of Michigan. A member of the Republican Party, he has been a member of the Michigan Senate since 2019, elected from the 26th district (since 2023) and 31st district (from 2019 to 2022). He was a member of the Michigan House of Representatives from January 2009 to 2015. A dairy farmer, he was the chairman of the House Agriculture Committee.

== Early life and career ==
Daley was born August 10, 1957. He graduated from Bishop Kelley Catholic School in Lapeer, and then Lapeer Senior High School.

He is a dairy farmer from Lum, in Arcadia Township, Lapeer County, in Michigan's Thumb region.

== Political career ==
Before his election to the Michigan House of Representatives in 2008, Daley spent 24 years in Arcadia Township local office, as township trustee (1985–1989) and treasurer and supervisor (1995–2008). In the August 2008 Republican primary election, he defeated six other candidates to win the party's nomination for the 82nd House district.

In the state House, Daley was chairman of the House Agriculture Committee. In 2014, he voted in favor of authorizing a wolf hunt in the Upper Peninsula. In 2014, he announced his run for state Senate in the 31st district seat, challenging first-term incumbent Mike Green in the Republican primary election. Green defeated Daley in a close primary race.

Daley ran for the Senate seat again in 2018 and won, defeating state Representative Gary Glenn in the August 2018 Republican primary, 58–41%. Daley was supported in the primary campaign by CMS Energy, Consumers Energy, and DTE Energy, which spent heavily to defeat Glenn, who later blamed the utility companies for contributing to his loss. Daley went on to defeat Bay County Clerk Cynthia Luczak in the November 2018 general election. The district covered Bay, Tuscola, and Lapeer counties. However, starting in the 2022 election (following the 2020 redistricting cycle), Daley's district changed to the 26th district, which now covers parts of Genesee, Lapeer, Saginaw, and Tuscola counties. In the 2022 race, Daley won reelection, defeating Democratic nominee Charles Stadler of Vassar.

In January 2021, Daley was one of 10 Michigan Senate Republicans who signed a letter to Congress in support of President Donald Trump's attempt to overturn his loss in the 2020 presidential election and remain in power. In 2024, Daley endorsed Trump's campaign for president.

In February 2022, Daley was one of several Senate Republicans to sponsor a symbolic, non-binding resolution that claimed that "radical politics" were infiltrating Michigan public schools, "resulting in education that amounts to political indoctrination" of students.

In November 2023, Daley joined the Senate Republican leadership team for the 102nd Michigan Legislature, as minority caucus chair.

In April 2023, Daley voted against a bill to amend an antiquated Michigan law that made it a misdemeanor for an unmarried man and woman to cohabitate or to "lewdly and lasciviously" associate. The bill passed 23–9.

Also in April 2023, Daley spoke against legislation to allow university graduate student research assistants at public colleges and universities in Michigan to unionize and collectively bargain; the bill passed the Senate on a 20-17 vote along party lines.

Daley is a member of the Michigan Workforce Development Board; in 2024, Governor Gretchen Whitmer appointed him to a second term, expiring January 1, 2027.

== Personal life ==
Daley is married and had three sons, the youngest of whom died in a farm accident in 2011. He is a member of the Roman Catholic Church, and the Knights of Columbus.

== Electoral history ==
=== 2008 ===
82nd District (Lapeer)
| Party | Candidate | Votes | % |
|---|---|---|---|
| Republican | Kevin Daley | 24,655 | 57.26 |
| Democratic | Bill Marquardt | 18,406 | 42.74 |
| Total votes | | 43,061 | 100.0 |
| Republican hold | | | |

=== 2010 ===
82nd District (Lapeer)
| Party | Candidate | Votes | % |
|---|---|---|---|
| Republican | Kevin Daley | 20,338 | 70.77 |
| Democratic | Mark Monson | 8,401 | 29.23 |
| Total votes | | 28,739 | 100.0 |
| Republican hold | | | |

=== 2012 ===
82nd District (Lapeer)
| Party | Candidate | Votes | % |
|---|---|---|---|
| Republican | Kevin Daley | 24,482 | 58.97 |
| Democratic | John Nugent | 17,032 | 41.03 |
| Total votes | | 41,514 | 100.0 |
| Republican hold | | | |
