= Roger Victory =

American politician

Member of the Michigan Senate
- Incumbent
- Assumed office January 1, 2019
- Preceded by: Arlan Meekhof
- Succeeded by: John Wetzel (elect)
- Constituency: 30th district (2019–2023); 31st district (2023–present)

Member of the Michigan House of Representatives from the 88th district
- In office January 1, 2013 – January 1, 2019
- Preceded by: Dave Agema
- Succeeded by: Luke Meerman

Personal details
- Born: November 17, 1964 (age 61) Zeeland, Michigan, U.S.
- Party: Republican
- Education: Davenport University (BA)
- Website: Party website

Roger Victory (born November 17, 1964) is a Republican politician from Michigan currently serving in the Michigan Senate, representing the 31st district since 2023. He previously represented the 30th district from 2019 to 2022.

== Biography ==
Victory graduated from Davenport University in 1989 after studying business management. He then later graduated from Michigan State University’s Great Lakes Leadership Academy. He is the owner of Victory Farms, LLC and Victory Sales, LLC. Victory is currently on the board of the Michigan Vegetable Council, Vice President of the Vriesland Growers Cooperative and serves on the National Council of Agricultural Employees.

Victory previously served in the Michigan House of Representatives from 2013 until 2019.

Victory, term-limited in the state Senate, announced in January 2026 that he was running to serve on the Michigan State University board of trustees. Him and fellow Republican nominee Julie Maday were defeated by the Democratic incumbents, Brianna Scott and Kelly Tebay Zemke.
