= 2008 Michigan House of Representatives election =

- November 4, 2008

All 110 seats in the Michigan House of Representatives 56 seats needed for a majority
- Turnout: 4,654,205 (62.29%)
	Majority party	Minority party
Leader	Andy Dillon	Kevin Elsenheimer
Party	Democratic	Republican
Leader's seat	17th District	105th District
Last election	58	52
Seats after	67	43
Seat change	▲9	▼9
Popular vote	2,693,373	1,960,832
Percentage	57.08%	41.56%
- Results: Democratic gain Democratic hold Republican hold
Speaker before election
Andy Dillon
Democratic
Elected Speaker
Andy Dillon
Democratic

The 2008 Michigan House of Representatives elections were held on November 4, 2008, with partisan primaries to select the parties' nominees in the various districts on August 5, 2008.

== Predictions ==
Source	Ranking	As of
Stateline	Lean D	October 15, 2008

== Results ==
=== Districts 1–28 ===
1st District (Wayne (Harper Woods, Grosse Pointe Woods, Grosse Pointe Township, Grosse Pointe Farms, Grosse Pointe, Grosse Pointe Park, far east Detroit))
Party	Candidate	Votes	%
Democratic	Tim Bledsoe	26,793	56.77
Republican	Mary Treder Lang	20,404	43.23
Total votes		47,197	100.0
Democratic gain from Republican			

2nd District (Wayne (northeast Detroit))
Party	Candidate	Votes	%
Democratic	LaMar Lemmons (incumbent)	25,325	96.46
Republican	Edith Floyd	930	3.54
Total votes		26,255	100.0
Democratic hold			

3rd District (Wayne (southeast Detroit))
Party	Candidate	Votes	%
Democratic	Bettie Cook Scott (incumbent)	27,841	98.11
Green	Fred Vitale	468	1.65
Libertarian	Tim Beck	69	0.24
Total votes		28,378	100.0
Democratic hold			

4th District (Wayne (south-central Detroit))
Party	Candidate	Votes	%
Democratic	Coleman Young (incumbent)	28,089	100
Total votes		28,089	100.0
Democratic hold			

5th District (Wayne (north Detroit, Highland Park, Hamtramck))
Party	Candidate	Votes	%
Democratic	Bert Johnson	25,589	100
Total votes		25,589	100.0
Democratic hold			

6th District (Wayne (south-central Detroit))
Party	Candidate	Votes	%
Democratic	Fred Durhal	28,167	100
Total votes		28,167	100.0
Democratic hold			

7th District (Wayne (north-central Detroit))
Party	Candidate	Votes	%
Democratic	Jimmy Womack	29,764	95.69
Green	Derek Grigsby	1,342	4.31
Total votes		31,106	100.0
Democratic hold			

8th District (Wayne (northwest Detroit))
Party	Candidate	Votes	%
Democratic	George Cushingberry Jr. (incumbent)	38,306	96.89
Libertarian	Thomas Jones	1,229	3.11
Total votes		39,535	100.0
Democratic hold			

9th District (Wayne (far northwest Detroit))
Party	Candidate	Votes	%
Democratic	Shanelle Jackson (incumbent)	34,084	100
Total votes		34,084	100.0
Democratic hold			

10th District (Wayne (west Detroit))
Party	Candidate	Votes	%
Democratic	Gabe Leland (incumbent)	27,644	94.81
Constitution	Marc Sosnowski	1,513	5.19
Total votes		29,157	100.0
Democratic hold			

11th District (Wayne (west-central Detroit))
Party	Candidate	Votes	%
Democratic	David Nathan	30,815	96.93
Republican	Leonard Mier	976	3.07
Total votes		31,791	100.0
Democratic hold			

12th District (Wayne (southwest Detroit))
Party	Candidate	Votes	%
Democratic	Rashida Tlaib	14,176	90.03
Republican	Darrin Daigle	1,569	9.97
Total votes		15,745	100.0
Democratic hold			

13th District (Wayne (Riverview, Southgate, Trenton, Wyandotte))
Party	Candidate	Votes	%
Democratic	Andrew Kandrevas	28,040	65.72
Republican	Timothy Kachinski	14,626	34.28
Total votes		42,666	100.0
Democratic hold			

14th District (Wayne (Ecorse, Lincoln Park, Melvindale, River Rouge, south Allen Park))
Party	Candidate	Votes	%
Democratic	Ed Clemente	28,699	76.33
Republican	Patrick O'Connell	8,898	23.67
Total votes		37,597	100.0
Democratic hold			

15th District (Wayne (Dearborn—excluding northeast tip))
Party	Candidate	Votes	%
Democratic	Gino Polidori (incumbent)	28,606	77.53
Republican	Scott Saionz	8,292	22.47
Total votes		36,898	100.0
Democratic hold			

16th District (Wayne (north Allen Park, Dearborn Heights—southwest tip, Garden City, Inkster))
Party	Candidate	Votes	%
Democratic	Bob Constan (incumbent)	28,194	75.53
Republican	Joseph Smith	9,133	24.47
Total votes		37,327	100.0
Democratic hold			

17th District (Wayne (Dearborn Heights—excluding southwest tip, Livonia—southeast tip, Redford Township))
Party	Candidate	Votes	%
Democratic	Andy Dillon (incumbent)	27,860	66.06
Republican	Sandra Eggers	14,311	33.94
Total votes		42,171	100.0
Democratic hold			

18th District (Wayne (Westland))
Party	Candidate	Votes	%
Democratic	Richard LeBlanc (incumbent)	28,952	88.59
Constitution	Harold Dunn	3,729	11.41
Total votes		32,681	100.0
Democratic hold			

19th District (Wayne (Livonia—excluding southeast tip))
Party	Candidate	Votes	%
Republican	John J. Walsh	29,749	60.01
Democratic	Steve King	19,827	39.99
Total votes		49,576	100.0
Republican hold			

20th District (Wayne (Northville—portion within county, Northville Township, Plymouth, Plymouth Township, east Canton Township, Wayne))
Party	Candidate	Votes	%
Democratic	Marc Corriveau	30,393	59
Republican	Jerry Vorva	21,124	41
Total votes		51,517	100.0
Democratic hold			

21st District (Wayne (Belleville, Van Buren Township, Canton Township—excluding eastern slice))
Party	Candidate	Votes	%
Democratic	Dian Slavens	27,802	51.69
Republican	Todd LaJoy	24,203	45
Independent	Brian Cronan	1,784	3.32
Total votes		53,789	100.0
Democratic gain from Republican			

22nd District (Wayne (Romulus, Taylor))
Party	Candidate	Votes	%
Democratic	Doug Geiss	25,673	70.58
Republican	Darrell McNeill	6,780	18.64
Independent	Charley Johnson	3,180	8.74
Libertarian	Dennis Schlemmer	739	2.03
Total votes		36,372	100.0
Democratic hold			

23rd District (Wayne (Brownstown Township, Flat Rock, Gibraltar, Grosse Ile Township, Huron Township, Rockwood, Sumpter Township, Woodhaven))
Party	Candidate	Votes	%
Democratic	Deb Kennedy	26,985	59.49
Republican	Neil DeBlois	18,375	40.51
Total votes		45,360	100.0
Democratic hold			

24th District (Macomb (Harrison Township, Lake Township, St. Clair Shores))
Party	Candidate	Votes	%
Democratic	Sarah Roberts	23,494	49.36
Republican	Bryan Brandenburg	22,428	47.12
Green	Jody Beaubien	1,678	3.53
Total votes		47,600	100.0
Democratic gain from Republican			

25th District (Macomb (south Sterling Heights, north Warren))
Party	Candidate	Votes	%
Democratic	Jon Switalski	26,869	62.94
Republican	Michael Wiecek	14,285	33.46
Libertarian	James Allison	653	1.53
Green	Richard Kuszmar	453	1.06
Constitution	Steven Revis	433	1.01
Total votes		42,693	100.0
Democratic hold			

26th District (Oakland (Madison Heights, Royal Oak))
Party	Candidate	Votes	%
Democratic	Marie Donigan (incumbent)	28,002	61.74
Republican	Michael Goodman	15,470	34.11
Libertarian	James Young	1,884	4.15
Total votes		45,356	100.0

27th District (Oakland (Berkley, Ferndale, Hazel Park, Huntington Woods, north Oak Park, Pleasant Ridge))
Party	Candidate	Votes	%
Democratic	Ellen Cogen Lipton	31,756	71.41
Republican	David Micola	10,098	22.71
Green	Shelley Bane	1,366	3.07
Libertarian	John Skosnik	1,250	2.81
Total votes		44,470	100.0
Democratic hold			

28th District (Macomb (south Warren, Center Line))
Party	Candidate	Votes	%
Democratic	Lesia Liss	24,651	70.45
Republican	Jason Balaska	10,339	29.55
Total votes		34,990	100.0
Democratic hold			

=== Districts 29–55 ===
29th District (Oakland (Auburn Hills, Pontiac))
Party	Candidate	Votes	%
Democratic	Tim Melton	25,695	83.51
Republican	Scott Sampeer	5,075	16.49
Total votes		30,770	100.0
Democratic hold			

30th District (Macomb (north Sterling Heights, Utica))
Party	Candidate	Votes	%
Republican	Tory Rocca (incumbent)	25,713	59.99
Democratic	Grant Hughes	17,147	40.01
Total votes		42,860	100.0
Republican hold			

31st District (Macomb (Clinton Township—excluding northeast portion, north Fraser, Mount Clemens))
Party	Candidate	Votes	%
Democratic	Fred Miller	26,404	66.1
Republican	Daniel Tollis	12,277	30.74
Libertarian	James Miller	1,263	3.16
Total votes		39,944	100.0
Democratic hold			

32nd District (Macomb (Armada Township, Chesterfield Township, Lenox Township, south Memphis, New Baltimore, Richmond—excluding portion outside county, Richmond Township), St. Clair (Columbus Township, Ira Township, Kimball Township, Wales Township))
Party	Candidate	Votes	%
Democratic	Jennifer Haase	23,681	49.78
Republican	Accavitti, John	22,450	47.19
Libertarian	Zemens Joseph	1,445	3.04
Total votes		47,576	100.0
Democratic gain from Republican			

33rd District (Macomb (Macomb Township, Ray Township, northwest Clinton Township))
Party	Candidate	Votes	%
Republican	Kimberly Meltzer (incumbent)	32,915	59.12
Democratic	Andrew Prasiloski	22,764	40.88
Total votes		55,679	100.0
Republican hold			

34th District (Genesee (north Flint))
Party	Candidate	Votes	%
Democratic	Woodrow Stanley	26,867	84.38
Republican	Adam Ford	4,973	15.62
Total votes		31,840	100.0
Democratic hold			

35th District (Oakland (Lathrup Village, southwest Oak Park, Royal Oak Township, Southfield))
Party	Candidate	Votes	%
Democratic	Vincent Gregory	41,015	87.55
Republican	Katie Koppin	4,936	10.54
Green	Franklin Harden	894	1.91
Total votes		46,845	100.0
Democratic hold			

36th District (Macomb (Bruce Township, Shelby Township, Washington Township))
Party	Candidate	Votes	%
Republican	Pete Lund	30,753	60.71
Democratic	Robert Murphy	19,904	39.29
Total votes		50,657	100.0
Republican hold			

37th District (Oakland (Farmington, Farmington Hills))
Party	Candidate	Votes	%
Democratic	Vicki Barnett	28,570	60.12
Republican	Paul Welday	18,953	39.88
Total votes		47,523	100.0
Democratic hold			

38th District (Oakland (Lyon Township, Northville-excluding portion outside county, Novi, Novi Township, South Lyon, Walled Lake, Wixom))
Party	Candidate	Votes	%
Republican	Hugh Crawford	27,110	57.5
Democratic	Chuck Tindall	20,037	42.5
Total votes		47,147	100.0
Republican hold			

39th District (Oakland (Commerce Township, south West Bloomfield Township))
Party	Candidate	Votes	%
Democratic	Lisa Brown	25,426	51.59
Republican	Amy Peterman	22,721	46.11
Libertarian	Jerry Plas	1,133	2.3
Total votes		49,280	100.0
Democratic gain from Republican			

40th District (Oakland (Birmingham, Bloomfield Hills, Bloomfield Township, Keego Harbor, Orchard Lake Village, Southfield Township, Sylvan Lake))
Party	Candidate	Votes	%
Republican	Chuck Moss (incumbent)	31,381	59.77
Democratic	Julie Candler	19,815	37.74
Libertarian	Larry Ross	1,307	2.49
Total votes		52,503	100.0
Republican hold			

41st District (Oakland (Clawson, Troy))
Party	Candidate	Votes	%
Republican	Marty Knollenberg (incumbent)	27,805	57.79
Democratic	Evan Ross Treharne	20,313	42.21
Total votes		48,118	100.0
Republican hold			

42nd District (Macomb (Eastpointe, south Fraser, Roseville))
Party	Candidate	Votes	%
Democratic	Harold Haugh	26,789	70.41
Republican	Greg Fleming	9,697	25.49
Libertarian	Daniel Flamand	1,560	4.1
Total votes		38,046	100.0
Democratic hold			

43rd District (Oakland (Lake Angelus, Waterford Township, northwest West Bloomfield Township))
Party	Candidate	Votes	%
Republican	Gail Haines	20,216	49.26
Democratic	Scott Hudson	19,367	47.19
Constitution	Paul Greenawalt	1,460	3.56
Total votes		41,043	100.0
Republican hold			

44th District (Oakland (Highland Township, Independence Township, Springfield Township, Clarkston Village, White Lake Township))
Party	Candidate	Votes	%
Republican	Eileen Kowall	33,271	66.6
Democratic	Mark Venie	16,685	33.4
Total votes		49,956	100.0
Republican hold			

45th District (Oakland (Oakland Township, Rochester Hills, Rochester))
Party	Candidate	Votes	%
Republican	Tom McMillin	29,445	57.48
Democratic	Randy Young	21,781	42.52
Total votes		51,226	100.0
Republican hold			

46th District (Oakland (Addison Township, Brandon Township, Groveland Township, Holly Township, Orion Township, Oxford Township, Rose Township))
Party	Candidate	Votes	%
Republican	James Marleau (incumbent)	29,263	60.58
Democratic	Katherine Houston	19,045	39.42
Total votes		48,308	100.0
Republican hold			

47th District (Livingston (Cohoctah Township, Conway Township, Deerfield Township, Hamburg Township, Handy Township, Hartland Township, Howell, Howell Township, Iosco Township, Marion Township—small northeast portion, Putnam Township, Tyrone Township, Unadilla Township
Party	Candidate	Votes	%
Republican	Cindy Denby	27,851	59.02
Democratic	Scott Lucas	17,059	36.15
Libertarian	Rodger Young	1,347	2.85
Constitution	Philip Johnson	929	1.97
Total votes		47,186	100.0
Republican hold			

48th District (Genesee (Clayton Township—northwest half, Clio, Flushing, Flushing Township, Montrose, Montrose Township, Mount Morris, Mount Morris Township, Thetford Township, Vienna Township))
Party	Candidate	Votes	%
Democratic	Richard Hammel	28,245	67.34
Republican	Ralph Burger	13,698	32.66
Total votes		41,943	100.0
Democratic hold			

49th District (Genesee (Clayton Township—southeast half, south Flint, Flint Township, Gaines Township, Swartz Creek))
Party	Candidate	Votes	%
Democratic	Lee Gonzales (incumbent)	32,653	100
Total votes		32,653	100.0
Democratic hold			

50th District (Genesee (Burton, Davison, Davison Township, Genesee Township, Richfield Township))
Party	Candidate	Votes	%
Democratic	Jim Slezak	29,792	72.52
Republican	Douglas O'Neal	11,290	27.48
Total votes		41,082	100.0
Democratic hold			

51st District (Genesee (Argentine Township, Atlas Township, Fenton, Fenton Township, Grand Blanc, Grand Blanc Township, Linden, Mundy Township))
Party	Candidate	Votes	%
Republican	Paul Scott	29,919	52.95
Democratic	Michael Thorp	26,587	47.05
Total votes		56,506	100.0
Republican hold			

52nd District (Washtenaw (north Ann Arbor, north Ann Arbor Township, Bridgewater Township, Dexter Township, Freedom Township, Lima Township, Lodi Township, Lyndon Township, Manchester Township, Northfield Township, Saline, Scio Township—most, Sharon Township, Sylvan T
Party	Candidate	Votes	%
Democratic	Pam Byrnes (incumbent)	35,954	62.95
Republican	Eric Lielbriedis	19,179	33.58
Libertarian	John Boyle	1,981	3.47
Total votes		57,114	100.0
Democratic hold			

53rd District (Washtenaw (south Ann Arbor, south Ann Arbor Township))
Party	Candidate	Votes	%
Democratic	Rebekah Warren (incumbent)	37,834	78.31
Republican	Christina Brewton	8,281	17.14
Green	Matt Erard	2,199	4.55
Total votes		48,314	100.0
Democratic hold			

54th District (Washtenaw (Augusta Township, Salem Township, Superior Township, Ypsilanti, Ypsilanti Township))
Party	Candidate	Votes	%
Democratic	Alma Wheeler Smith (incumbent)	33,501	71.13
Republican	Tom Banks	12,281	26.07
Libertarian	David Raaflaub	1,319	2.8
Total votes		47,101	100.0
Democratic hold			

55th District (Monroe (Beford Township, Dundee Township, Erie Township, Milan, Milan Township, Petersburg, Summerfield Township, Whiteford Township), Washtenaw (Milan, Pittsfield Township, Saline Township, York Township))
Party	Candidate	Votes	%
Democratic	Kathy Angerer (incumbent)	33,234	66.09
Republican	Frank Moynihan	17,054	33.91
Total votes		50,288	100.0
Democratic hold			

=== Districts 56–83 ===
56th District (Monroe (Ash Township, Berlin Township, Exeter Township, Frenchtown Township, Ida Township, LaSalle Township, London Township, Luna Pier, Monroe, Monroe Township, Raisinville Township))
Party	Candidate	Votes	%
Democratic	Kate Ebli (incumbent)	28,495	63.07
Republican	JeanMarie Dahm	15,459	34.22
Constitution	John Eleniewski	1,224	2.71
Total votes		45,178	100.0
Democratic hold			

57th District (Lenawee (excluding Cambridge Township))
Party	Candidate	Votes	%
Democratic	Dudley Spade (incumbent)	29,125	67.93
Republican	Emma Jenkins	13,752	32.07
Total votes		42,877	100.0
Democratic hold			

58th District (Branch, Hillsdale)
Party	Candidate	Votes	%
Republican	Kenneth Kurtz	24,487	66.83
Democratic	Jeane Ann Kennedy Windsor	12,151	33.17
Total votes		36,638	100.0
Republican hold			

59th District (Cass (excluding Dowagiac, Howard Township, Niles, Silver Creek Township, Wayne Township), St. Joseph)
Party	Candidate	Votes	%
Republican	Matt Lori	23,826	59.86
Democratic	Carol Higgins	15,977	40.14
Total votes		39,803	100.0
Republican hold			

60th District (Kalamazoo (Cooper Township, Kalamazoo, east Kalamazoo Township))
Party	Candidate	Votes	%
Democratic	Robert Jones (incumbent)	30,135	73.87
Republican	Charles Ybema	10,658	26.13
Total votes		40,793	100.0
Democratic hold			

61st District (Kalamazoo (Alamo Township, north Kalamazoo Township, Oshtemo Township, Parchment, Portage, Prairie Ronde Township, Texas Township))
Party	Candidate	Votes	%
Republican	Larry DeShazor	28,303	51.07
Democratic	Julie Rogers	27,122	48.93
Total votes		55,425	100.0
Republican hold			

62nd District (Calhoun (Albion, Albion Township, Battle Creek, Burlington Township, Clarence Township, Clarendon Township, Convis Township, Eckford Township, Fredonia Township, Homer Township, Lee Township, Leroy Township, Marengo Township, Sheridan Township, Springfie
Party	Candidate	Votes	%
Democratic	Kate Segal	25,011	61.86
Republican	Greg Moore	15,419	38.14
Total votes		40,430	100.0
Democratic gain from Republican			

63rd District (Calhoun (Bedford Township, Emmet Township, Fredonia Township—part, Marshall—most, Marshall Township, Newton Township, Pennfield Township), Kalamazoo (Brady Township, Charleston Township, Climax Township, Comstock Township, Galesburg, Pavilion Township,
Party	Candidate	Votes	%
Republican	Jase Bolger	27,641	56.62
Democratic	Phyllis Smith	21,179	43.38
Total votes		48,820	100.0
Republican hold			

64th District (Jackson (Concord Township, Hanover Township, Jackson, Napoleon Township, Parma Township, Pulaski Township, Sandstone Township, Spring Arbor Township, Summit Township))
Party	Candidate	Votes	%
Democratic	Martin Griffin	24,260	62.66
Republican	Leland Prebble	14,454	37.34
Total votes		38,714	100.0
Democratic hold			

65th District (Eaton (Brookfield Township, Eaton Rapids, Hamlin Township), Jackson (Blackman Township, Columbia Township, Grass Lake Township, Henrietta Township, Leoni Township, Liberty Township, Norvell Township, Rives Township, Springport Township, Tompkins Township
Party	Candidate	Votes	%
Democratic	Mike Simpson	25,444	63.29
Republican	Ray Snell	14,759	36.71
Total votes		40,203	100.0
Democratic hold			

66th District (Livingston (Brighton, Brighton Township, Genoa Township, Green Oak Township, Marion Township—part, Oceola Township), Oakland (Milford Township))
Party	Candidate	Votes	%
Republican	Bill Rogers	32,128	60.29
Democratic	Donna Anderson	19,145	35.92
Libertarian	Todd Richardson	2,020	3.79
Total votes		53,293	100.0
Republican hold			

67th District (Ingham (Alaiedon Township, Aurelius Township, Bunker Hill Township, Delhi Charter Township, Ingham Township, southwest Lansing, Leroy Township, Leslie, Leslie Township, Locke Township, Mason, Onondaga Township, Stockbridge Township, Vevay Township, Wheat
Party	Candidate	Votes	%
Democratic	Barb Byrum (incumbent)	30,692	62.85
Republican	Mike Herter	16,794	34.39
Libertarian	Vince Dragonetti	1,347	2.76
Total votes		48,833	100.0
Democratic hold			

68th District (Ingham (Lansing—excluding southwest portion, Lansing Township))
Party	Candidate	Votes	%
Democratic	Joan Bauer (incumbent)	33,866	77.76
Republican	David Irons	8,797	20.2
Constitution	DelRae Finnerty	889	2.04
Total votes		43,552	100.0
Democratic hold			

69th District (Ingham (east East Lansing, Williamston Township—most))
Party	Candidate	Votes	%
Democratic	Mark Meadows (incumbent)	30,948	69.17
Republican	Frank Lambert	13,794	30.83
Total votes		44,742	100.0
Democratic hold			

70th District (Ionia (Belding, Berlin Township—small part, Ionia, Ionia Township—part, Keene Township, Orleans Township, Otisco Township), Montcalm)
Party	Candidate	Votes	%
Democratic	Mike Huckleberry	21,212	54.35
Republican	Thomas Ginster	17,814	45.65
Total votes		39,026	100.0
Democratic gain from Republican			

71st District (Eaton (excluding Brookfield Township, Eaton Rapids, Hamlin Township))
Party	Candidate	Votes	%
Republican	Rick Jones (incumbent)	29,169	58.07
Democratic	Mark Eagle	21,063	41.93
Total votes		50,232	100.0
Republican hold			

72nd District (Kent (Caledonia Township, Cascade Township, Gaines Township, Kentwood))
Party	Candidate	Votes	%
Republican	Justin Amash	31,238	60.95
Democratic	Albert Abbasse	18,454	36.01
Libertarian	William Wenzel	1,558	3.04
Total votes		51,250	100.0
Republican hold			

73rd District (Kent (Algoma Township, Cannon Township, Cedar Springs, Courtland Township, Nelson Township, Oakfield Township, Plainfield Township, Rockford, Solon Township, Sparta Township, Spencer Township, Tyrone Township))
Party	Candidate	Votes	%
Republican	Tom Pearce	31,754	58.93
Democratic	Bruce Hawley	20,615	38.26
Libertarian	Larry Orcutt	1,514	2.81
Total votes		53,883	100.0
Republican hold			

74th District (Kent (Alpine Township, Grandville), Ottawa (Coopersville, Crockery Township, Georgetown Township, Polkton Township, Tallmadge Township, Wright Township))
Party	Candidate	Votes	%
Republican	David Agema (incumbent)	36,204	70.25
Democratic	Leon Chase	13,421	26.04
Libertarian	Tracey McLaughlin	1,911	3.71
Total votes		51,536	100.0
Republican hold			

75th District (Kent (east Grand Rapids))
Party	Candidate	Votes	%
Democratic	Robert Dean (incumbent)	24,676	58.08
Republican	Dan Tietema	16,930	39.85
Libertarian	Mark Simonait	880	2.07
Total votes		42,486	100.0
Democratic hold			

76th District (Kent (west Grand Rapids))
Party	Candidate	Votes	%
Democratic	Roy Schmidt (incumbent)	23,413	71.33
Republican	Marc Tonnemacher	7,048	21.47
Constitution	William Mohr	1,340	4.08
Libertarian	Matthew Friar	1,022	3.11
Total votes		32,823	100.0
Democratic hold			

77th District (Kent (Byron Township, Wyoming))
Party	Candidate	Votes	%
Republican	Kevin Green (incumbent)	25,338	62.38
Democratic	Charles Geerlings	14,119	34.76
Libertarian	Mike Orcutt	1,161	2.86
Total votes		40,618	100.0
Republican hold			

78th District (Berrien (Baroda Township, Berrien Township, Bertland Township, Buchanan, Buchanan Township, Chikaming Township, Galien Township, New Buffalo, New Buffalo Township, Niles, Niles Township, Oronoko Township, Pipestone Township, Three Oaks Township, Weesaw T
Party	Candidate	Votes	%
Republican	Sharon Tyler	20,226	52.06
Democratic	Judy Truesdell	18,623	47.94
Total votes		38,849	100.0
Republican hold			

79th District (Berrien (Bainbridge Township, Benton Charter Township, Benton Harbor, Bridgeman, Coloma, Coloma Township, Hager Township, Lake Charter Township, Lincoln Township, Royalton Township, Sodus Township, St. Joseph Charter Township, St. Joseph, Watervliet, Wat
Party	Candidate	Votes	%
Republican	John Proos (incumbent)	25,440	57.29
Democratic	Jim Hahn	18,964	42.71
Total votes		44,404	100.0
Republican hold			

80th District (Allegan (Otsego, Otsego Township, Watson Township), Van Buren)
Party	Candidate	Votes	%
Republican	Tonya Schuitmaker (incumbent)	23,428	61.07
Democratic	Jessie Olson	14,935	38.93
Total votes		38,363	100.0
Republican hold			

81st District (St. Clair (Algonac, Berlin Township, Brockway Township, Casco Township, China Township, Clay Township, Clyde Township, Cottrellville Township, East China Township, Emmet Township, Grant Township, Greenwood Township, Kenockee Township, Lynn Township, Mari
Party	Candidate	Votes	%
Republican	Phil Pavlov	30,125	64.26
Democratic	Brent Pencak	16,757	35.74
Total votes		46,882	100.0
Republican hold			

82nd District (Lapeer)
Party	Candidate	Votes	%
Republican	Kevin Daley	24,655	57.26
Democratic	Bill Marquardt	18,406	42.74
Total votes		43,061	100.0
Republican hold			

83rd District (Sanilac, St. Clair (Burtchville Township, Fort Gratiot Township, Port Huron))
Party	Candidate	Votes	%
Democratic	John Espinoza (incumbent)	26,005	64.52
Republican	Steve Kearns	14,299	35.48
Total votes		40,304	100.0
Democratic hold			

=== Districts 84–110 ===
84th District (Huron, Tuscola)
Party	Candidate	Votes	%
Democratic	Terry Brown (incumbent)	28,191	64.79
Republican	Anna Kabot	15,320	35.21
Total votes		43,511	100.0
Democratic hold			

85th District (Clinton (Bath Township, Dewitt Township—part, Ovid Township, Victor Township, Shiawassee))
Party	Candidate	Votes	%
Republican	Dick Ball (incumbent)	22,205	52.77
Democratic	Judy Ford	18,593	44.19
Constitution	James Gould	1,280	3.04
Total votes		42,078	100.0
Republican hold			

86th District (Kent (Ada Township, Bowne Township, East Grand Rapids, north-central Grand Rapids, Grand Rapids Township, Grattan Township, Lowell, Lowell Township, Vergennes Township, Walker))
Party	Candidate	Votes	%
Republican	Dave Hildenbrand (incumbent)	34,004	64.52
Democratic	Melissa Casalina	17,135	32.51
Libertarian	Patricia Steinport	1,565	2.97
Total votes		52,704	100.0
Republican hold			

87th District (Barry, Ionia (Berlin Township—most, Boston Township, Campbell Township, Danby Township, Ionia—small part, Ionia Township—most, Lyons Township, North Plains Township, Odessa Township, Orange Township, Portland, Portland Township, Ronald Township, Sebew
Party	Candidate	Votes	%
Republican	Brian Calley (incumbent)	29,582	64.05
Democratic	Greg Grieves	14,359	31.09
Constitution	Phillip Adams	1,267	2.74
Libertarian	Joseph Gillotte	975	2.11
Total votes		46,183	100.0
Republican hold			

88th District (Allegan (excluding Watson Township, Otsego, Otsego Township))
Party	Candidate	Votes	%
Republican	Bob Genetski	29,064	61.6
Democratic	Tom Clark	18,119	38.4
Total votes		47,183	100.0
Republican hold			

89th District (Ottawa (Allendale Township, Ferrysburg, Grand Haven, Grand Haven Township, Olive Township, Park Township, Port Sheldon Township, Robinson Township, Spring Lake Township))
Party	Candidate	Votes	%
Republican	Arlan Meekhof (incumbent)	28,927	60.81
Democratic	Tim Winslow	16,529	34.74
Libertarian	Terry Ashcraft	2,117	4.45
Total votes		47,573	100.0
Republican hold			

90th District (Ottawa (Blendon, Holland—part within county, Holland Township, Hudsonville, Jamestown Township, Zeeland, Zeeland Township))
Party	Candidate	Votes	%
Republican	Joe Haveman	31,231	72.25
Democratic	Clay Stauffer	11,995	27.75
Total votes		43,226	100.0
Republican hold			

91st District (Muskegon (Blue Lake Township, Casnovia Township, Cedar Creek Township, Dalton Township, Egelston Township, Fruitport Township, Holton Township, Montague, Montague Township, Moorland Township, Ravenna Township, Roosevelt Park, Sullivan Township, White Riv
Party	Candidate	Votes	%
Democratic	Mary Valentine (incumbent)	24,444	53.75
Republican	Holly Hughes	21,034	46.25
Total votes		45,478	100.0
Democratic hold			

92nd District (Muskegon (Fruitland Township, Laketon Township, Muskegon Heights, Muskegon, Muskegon Township, North Muskegon))
Party	Candidate	Votes	%
Democratic	Doug Bennett (incumbent)	26,005	73.6
Republican	James McCormick	9,330	26.4
Total votes		35,335	100.0
Democratic hold			

93rd District (Clinton (excluding Ovid Township, Victor Township, Bath Township, Dewitt Township—part), Gratiot)
Party	Candidate	Votes	%
Republican	Paul Opsommer (incumbent)	26,515	57.86
Democratic	Ronald McComb	17,951	39.17
Libertarian	Darryl Schmitz	1,358	2.96
Total votes		45,824	100.0
Republican hold			

94th District (Saginaw (Albee Township, Birch Run Township, Blumfield Township, Chesaning Township, Frankenmuth, Frankenmuth Township, James Township, Maple Grove Township, Saginaw Township, St. Charles Township, Swan Creek Township, Taymouth Township, Thomas Township)
Party	Candidate	Votes	%
Republican	Ken Horn (incumbent)	28,448	57.66
Democratic	Bob Blaine	20,889	42.34
Total votes		49,337	100.0
Republican hold			

95th District (Saginaw (Bridgeport Township, Buena Vista Township, Saginaw, Spaulding Township))
Party	Candidate	Votes	%
Democratic	Andy Coulouris (incumbent)	28,323	86.42
Republican	Ted Rosingana	4,451	13.58
Total votes		32,774	100.0
Democratic hold			

96th District (Bay (Auburn, Bangor Township, Bay City, Beaver Township, Essexville, Frankenlust Township, Hampton Township, Merritt Township, Midland—portion within county, Monitor Township, Portsmouth Township, Williams Township))
Party	Candidate	Votes	%
Democratic	Jeff Mayes (incumbent)	32,208	69.78
Republican	Richard Rau	13,950	30.22
Total votes		46,158	100.0
Democratic hold			

97th District (Arenac, Bay (Fraser Township, Garfield Township, Gibson Township, Kawkawlin Township, Mount Forest Township, Pinconning, Pinconning Township), Clare, Gladwin)
Party	Candidate	Votes	%
Republican	Tim Moore (incumbent)	25,996	60.63
Democratic	Kathy Wilton	16,877	39.37
Total votes		42,873	100.0
Republican hold			

98th District (Midland (Homer Township, Ingersoll Township, Larkin Township—small part, Lincoln Township—small part, Midland—almost all, Midland Township, Mount Haley Township), Saginaw (Brady Township, Brant Township, Carrollton Township, Chapin Township, Fremont Town
Party	Candidate	Votes	%
Republican	Jim Stamas	25,977	58.04
Democratic	Garnet Lewis	18,781	41.96
Total votes		44,758	100.0
Republican hold			

99th District (Isabella, Midland (Coleman, Edenville Township, Geneva Township, Greendale Township, Hope Township, Jasper Township, Jerome Township, Larkin Township—almost all, Lee Township, Lincoln Township—almost all, Mills Township, Porter Township, Warren Township)
Party	Candidate	Votes	%
Republican	Bill Caul (incumbent)	22,486	54.43
Democratic	Nancy White	17,578	42.55
Libertarian	Devon Smith	1,244	3.01
Total votes		41,308	100.0
Republican hold			

100th District (Lake, Newaygo, Oceana)
Party	Candidate	Votes	%
Republican	Goeff Hansen (incumbent)	21,947	55.83
Democratic	Bill Richards	16,341	41.57
Libertarian	Nathaniel Hren	1,020	2.59
Total votes		39,308	100.0
Republican hold			

101st District (Benzie, Leelanau, Manistee, Mason)
Party	Candidate	Votes	%
Democratic	Daniel Scripps (incumbent)	30,979	59.89
Republican	Ray Franz	20,746	40.11
Total votes		51,725	100.0
Democratic gain from Republican			

102nd District (Mecosta, Osceola, Wexford)
Party	Candidate	Votes	%
Republican	Darwin Booher (incumbent)	26,198	69.59
Democratic	Nate Heffron	10,694	28.41
Libertarian	Thomas Hren	753	2
Total votes		37,645	100.0
Republican hold			

103rd District (Iosco, Missaukee, Ogemaw, Roscommon)
Party	Candidate	Votes	%
Democratic	Joel Sheltrown (incumbent)	29,927	66.61
Republican	Dave Ryan	15,003	33.39
Total votes		44,930	100.0
Democratic hold			

104th District (Grand Traverse, Kalkaska)
Party	Candidate	Votes	%
Republican	Wayne Schmidt	29,116	53.28
Democratic	Roman Grucz	23,465	42.94
Libertarian	Dan McDougall	2,069	3.79
Total votes		54,650	100.0
Republican hold			

105th District (Antrim, Charlevoix, Cheboygan (excluding Koehler Township, Tuscarora Township), Otsego)
Party	Candidate	Votes	%
Republican	Kevin Elsenheimer (incumbent)	30,568	60.68
Democratic	Connie Saltonstall	18,455	36.63
Libertarian	Greg Dean	1,354	2.69
Total votes		50,377	100.0
Republican hold			

106th District (Alcona, Alpena, Crawford, Montmorency, Oscoda, Presque Isle)
Party	Candidate	Votes	%
Democratic	Andy Neumann	23,438	53.14
Republican	Peter Pettalia	19,345	43.86
Libertarian	Scott Alexander	1,321	3
Total votes		44,104	100.0
Democratic gain from Republican			

107th District (Cheboygan (Koehler Township, Tuscarora Township), Chippewa, Emmet, Mackinac)
Party	Candidate	Votes	%
Democratic	Gary McDowell (incumbent)	31,851	68.72
Republican	Alex Strobehn	14,500	31.28
Total votes		46,351	100.0
Democratic hold			

108th District (Delta, Dickinson, Menominee)
Party	Candidate	Votes	%
Democratic	Judy Nerat	23,800	56.47
Republican	Mike Falcon	18,350	43.53
Total votes		42,150	100.0
Democratic gain from Republican			

109th District (Alger, Luce, Marquette (excluding Powell Township, West Branch Township), Schoolcraft)
Party	Candidate	Votes	%
Democratic	Steven Lindberg (incumbent)	26,760	63.61
Republican	Doreen Takalo	12,442	29.57
Independent	Richard Hendricksen	2,870	6.82
Total votes		42,072	100.0
Democratic hold			

110th District (Baraga, Gogebic, Houghton, Iron, Keweenaw, Marquette (Powell Township), Ontonagon)
Party	Candidate	Votes	%
Democratic	Michael Lahti (incumbent)	26,991	70.49
Republican	John Larson	11,302	29.51
Total votes		38,293	100.0
Democratic hold			

== See also ==
- Michigan Legislature
- Michigan's congressional delegations
