= Phil Phelps =

American politician (born 1979)

Member of the Michigan House of Representatives from the 49th district
- In office November 7, 2013 – January 9, 2019
- Preceded by: Jim Ananich
- Succeeded by: John Daniel Cherry

Personal details
- Born: Philip Owen Phelps; May 1, 1979 (age 47) Flint, Michigan, U.S.
- Party: Democratic

Philip Owen Phelps (born May 1, 1979) is an American politician and a former member of the Michigan House of Representatives. A member of the Democratic party, he was first elected in a special election in 2013 to replace Jim Ananich to represent Michigan's 49th House of Representatives district after Ananich resigned his seat to replace John J. Gleason to represent the 27th district in the Michigan Senate.

== Career ==
Phelps was a special advisor to Richard Hammel, the former minority leader of the Michigan House of Representatives, and in 2013 was the chief of staff for Pam Faris.

Phelps was first elected in a special election in 2013 to replace Jim Ananich to represent Michigan's 49th House of Representatives district after Ananich resigned his seat to replace John J. Gleason to represent the 27th district in the Michigan Senate.

== Electoral history ==
Michigan House of Representatives: 49th District Special General Election (November 5, 2013)
Party	Candidate	Votes	%
Democratic	Phil Phelps	4,894	63.41
Republican	Don Pfeiffer	2,501	32.40
Libertarian	Pat Clawson	323	4.19
Total votes		7,718	100.00
Democratic hold			

Michigan House of Representatives: 49th District General Election (2014)
Party	Candidate	Votes	%
Democratic	Phil Phelps (incumbent)	18,211	73.6
Republican	Lutullus Sullus Penton Jr.	6,524	26.4
Total votes		24,735	100.00
Democratic hold			

Michigan House of Representatives: 49th District General Election (2016)
Party	Candidate	Votes	%
Democratic	Phil Phelps (incumbent)	24,862	68.45
Republican	Jeremy Baker	11,458	31.55
Total votes		36,320	100.00
Democratic hold			
