= 2010 Michigan Senate election =

2010 Michigan Senate elections
- November 2, 2010

38 seats in the Michigan Senate 20 seats needed for a majority
- Turnout: 3,145,959 (42.51%)
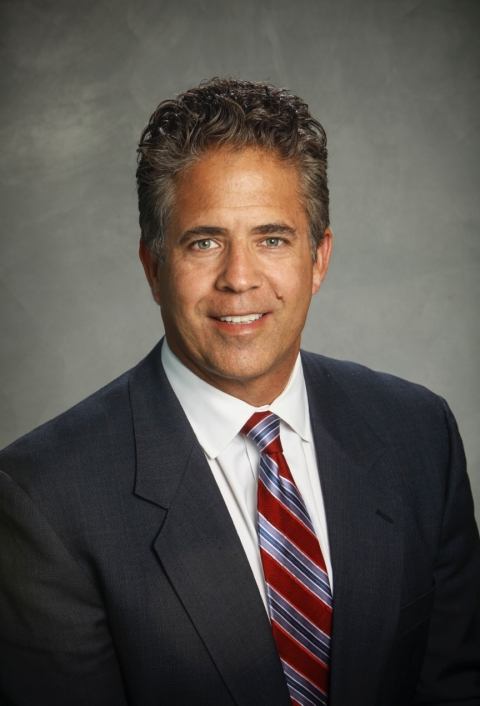

	Majority party	Minority party
Leader	Mike Bishop	Mike Prusi
Party	Republican	Democratic
Leader since	January 10, 2007	January 1, 2009
Leader's seat	12th—Pontiac	28th—Ishpeming
Last election	21	17
Seats before	22	16
Seats after	26	12
Seat change	▲4	▼4
Popular vote	1,688,851	1,404,868
Percentage	53.68%	44.66%
- Results: Republican gain Democratic hold Republican hold
Majority Leader before election
Michael D. Bishop
Republican
Elected Majority Leader
Randy Richardville
Republican

The 2010 Michigan Senate elections were held on November 2 of that year, with partisan primaries to determine each party's nominees on August 3. The election was the last contested under constituency boundaries drawn as a result of the 2000 U.S. census, and members served in the 96th and 97th Legislatures.

== Term-limited Senators ==
State Senators are only allowed to serve two four-year terms, a maximum of eight years. The following Senators were not eligible to run for a new term in 2010:

- Sen. Jim Barcia (D-31st District)

== Predictions ==
Source	Ranking	As of
Governing	Likely R	November 1, 2010

== Results ==
All results below are from the certified election results posted by the secretary of state.

1st District (Wayne County (south and east Detroit, Grosse Pointe Park))
Party	Candidate	Votes	%
Democratic	Coleman Young II	40,122	93.27
Republican	Dakeisha Harwick	2,895	6.7
Total votes		43,017	100.0
Democratic hold			

2nd District (Wayne (Grosse Pointe Park, Grosse Pointe, Grosse Pointe Farms, Grosse Pointe Township))
Party	Candidate	Votes	%
Democratic	Bert Johnson	34,858	65.62
Republican	John Chouinard	17,459	32.86
Libertarian	Gregory Creswell	808	1.52
Total votes		53,125	100.0
Democratic hold			

3rd District (Wayne County (west Detroit; excluding northwest, southwest and far east Dearborn; Melvindale; River Rouge))
Party	Candidate	Votes	%
Democratic	Morris Hood III	43,849	78.52
Republican	Doug Mitchell	11,994	21.48
Total votes		55,843	100.0
Democratic hold			

4th District (Wayne County (northwest and west Detroit, northeast Dearborn Heights))
Party	Candidate	Votes	%
Democratic	Virgil Smith	42,722	94.47
Republican	Frederick Robinson II	1,241	2.74
Independent	D. Etta Wilcoxon	931	2.06
Libertarian	Raymond Warner	329	0.73
Total votes		45,223	100.0
Democratic hold			

5th District (Wayne County (excluding northeast and southeast Dearborn Heights, excluding east Dearborn, Inkster))
Party	Candidate	Votes	%
Democratic	Tupac Hunter (incumbent)	44,055	83.26
Republican	Bonnie Patrick	8,856	16.74
Total votes		52,911	100.0
Democratic hold			

6th District (Wayne County (Livonia, Redford Township, Westland, Garden City))
Party	Candidate	Votes	%
Democratic	Glenn Anderson (incumbent)	46,471	55.67
Republican	John Pastor	37,001	44.33
Total votes		83,472	100.0
Democratic hold			

7th District (Wayne County (Northville-excluding portion outside county, Northville Township, Plymouth, Canton Township, Van Buren Township, Belleville, Sumpter Township, Huron Township, Brownstown Township, Flat Rock, Woodhaven, Trenton, Grosse Ile Township, Gibraltar, Rockwood))
Party	Candidate	Votes	%
Republican	Patrick Colbeck	55,284	52.24
Democratic	Kathleen Law	43,173	40.79
Independent	John Stewart	5,508	5.20
Libertarian	Marlin Brandys	1,134	1.07
Independent	Michael Kheibari	734	0.69
Total votes		105,833	100.0
Republican hold			

8th District (Wayne County (Wayne, Romulus, Taylor, Allen Park, Melvindale, Lincoln Park, Ecorse, Southgate, Wyandotte, Riverview))
Party	Candidate	Votes	%
Democratic	Hoon-Yung Hopgood	37,845	54.92
Republican	Ken Larkin	25,280	36.68
Independent	Neil Sawicki	4,697	6.82
Libertarian	Loel Gnadt	1,093	1.59
Total votes		68,915	100.0
Democratic hold			

9th District (Macomb County (Fraser, Warren, Center Line, Eastpointe, St. Clair Shores))
Party	Candidate	Votes	%
Democratic	Steven Bieda	42,039	54.34
Republican	Michael Ennis	33,258	42.99
Green	Richard Kuszmar	2,072	2.68
Total votes		77,369	100.0
Democratic hold			

10th District (Macomb County (Sterling Heights, Utica, Clinton Township, Roseville))
Party	Candidate	Votes	%
Republican	Tory Rocca	44,486	54.35
Democratic	Paul Gieleghem	37,369	45.65
Total votes		81,855	100.0
Republican gain from Democratic			

11th District (Macomb County (all municipalities north of [and excluding] Utica, Sterling Heights and Clinton Township; Harrison Township; Mount Clemens))
Party	Candidate	Votes	%
Republican	Jack Brandenburg	65,403	65.69
Democratic	Jim Ayres	34,166	34.31
Total votes		99,569	100.0
Republican hold			

12th District (Oakland County (Oxford Township, Addison Township, Independence Township, Clarkston, Orion Township, Oakland Township, Lake Angelus, Rochester, Rochester Hills, Auburn Hills, Pontiac, Sylvan Lake, Keego Harbor))
Party	Candidate	Votes	%
Republican	Jim Marleau	56,894	60.90
Democratic	Casandra Ulbrich	36,526	39.10
Total votes		93,420	100.0
Republican hold			

13th District (Oakland (Troy, Bloomfield Hills, Bloomfield Township, Clawson, Royal Oak, Madison Heights, Berkley))
Party	Candidate	Votes	%
Republican	John Pappageorge (incumbent)	62,324	59.27
Democratic	Aaron Bailey	42,830	40.73
Total votes		105,154	100.0
Republican hold			

14th District (Oakland (Farmington Hills, Farmington, Southfield Township, Lathrup Village, Southfield, Oak Park, Oak Park, Huntington Woods, Pleasant Ridge, Hazel Park, Ferndale, Royal Oak Township))
Party	Candidate	Votes	%
Democratic	Vincent Gregory	62,863	64.66
Republican	Michael Peters	31,944	32.86
Green	Karen Anne Shelley	2,415	2.48
Total votes		97,222	100.0
Democratic hold			

15th District (Oakland (Holly Township, Rose Township, Highland Township, White Lake Township, Milford Township, Commerce Township, Walled Lake, West Bloomfield Township, Orchard Lake, Wixom, Lyon Township, South Lyon, Novi, Novi Township, Northville-excluding portion outside county))
Party	Candidate	Votes	%
Republican	Mike Kowall	65,216	62.44
Democratic	Pam Jackson	39,233	37.56
Total votes		104,449	100.0
Republican hold			

16th District (St. Joseph, Branch, Hillsdale, Lenawee)
Party	Candidate	Votes	%
Republican	Bruce Caswell	47,504	64.47
Democratic	Doug Spade	26,181	35.53
Total votes		73,685	100.0
Republican hold			

17th District (Jackson (Grass Lake Township, Leoni Township, Norvell Township, Summit Township), Monroe, Washtenaw (Bridgewater Township, Lodi Township, Manchester Township, most of Pittsfield Township, most of Milan, Saline, Saline Township, York Township))
Party	Candidate	Votes	%
Republican	Randy Richardville (incumbent)	51,657	59.33
Democratic	John Spencer	32,980	37.88
Libertarian	Ronald Muszynski	2,425	2.79
Total votes		87,062	100.0
Republican hold			

18th District (Washtenaw (Ann Arbor, Ann Arbor Township, Augusta Township, Dexter Township, Freedom Township, Lima Township, Lyndon Township, Northfield Township, small part of Pittsfield Township, Salem Township, Scio Township, Sharon Township, Superior Township, Sylvan Township, Webster Township, Ypsilanti, Ypsilanti Township))
Party	Candidate	Votes	%
Democratic	Rebekah Warren	60,333	65.51
Republican	John Hochstetler	31,771	34.49
Total votes		92,104	100.0
Democratic hold			

19th District (Calhoun, Jackson (excluding Summit Township, Leoni Township, Grass Lake Township, Norvell Township))
Party	Candidate	Votes	%
Republican	Mike Nofs (incumbent)	46,543	63.58
Democratic	Brenda Abbey	26,657	36.42
Total votes		73,200	100.0
Republican hold			

20th District (Kalamazoo, Van Buren (Antwerp Township, Paw Paw Township))
Party	Candidate	Votes	%
Republican	Tonya Schuitmaker	47,680	58.01
Democratic	Bobby Hopewell	34,507	41.99
Total votes		82,187	100.0
Republican hold			

21st District (Berrien, Cass, Van Buren (excluding Paw Paw Township, Antwerp Township))
Party	Candidate	Votes	%
Republican	John Proos	49,818	66.53
Democratic	Scott Elliott	25,062	33.47
Total votes		74,880	100.0
Republican hold			

22nd District (Ingham (Bunker Hill Township, Leslie, Leslie Township, Mason, Stockbridge Township, Vevay Township), Livingston, Shiawassee)
Party	Candidate	Votes	%
Republican	Joe Hune	65,170	66.71
Democratic	Chuck Fellows	29,325	30.02
Libertarian	Todd Richardson	3,201	3.29
Total votes		97,696	100.0
Republican hold			

23rd District (Ingham (Alaiedon Township, Aurelius Township, Delhi Charter Township, East Lansing—excluding portion outside county, Lansing—excluding portion outside county, Leroy Township, Locke Township, Meridian Township, Onondaga Township, Wheatfield Township, White Oak Township, Williamston, Williamston Township))
Party	Candidate	Votes	%
Democratic	Gretchen Whitmer (incumbent)	49,990	63.99
Republican	Kyle Haubrich	28,133	36.01
Total votes		78,123	100.0
Democratic hold			

24th District (Allegan, Barry, Eaton)
Party	Candidate	Votes	%
Republican	Rick Jones	64,039	65.68
Democratic	Michelle Disano	30,052	30.82
Libertarian	Bradley Cook	3,413	3.50
Total votes		97,504	100.0
Republican hold			

25th District (Lapeer, St. Clair)
Party	Candidate	Votes	%
Republican	Phil Pavlov	53,342	66.90
Democratic	John Nugent	26,393	33.10
Total votes		79,735	100.0
Republican hold			

26th District (Genesee (Atlas Township, Burton, Clio, Davison, Davison Township, Forest Township, Grand Blanc, Grand Blanc Township, Mount Morris, Mount Morris Township, Richfield Township, Thetford Township, Vienna Township), Oakland (Brandon Township, Groveland Township, Springfield Township, Waterford Township))
Party	Candidate	Votes	%
Republican	Dave Robertson	49,700	55.00
Democratic	Paula Zelenko	36,231	40.10
Independent	Mark Sanborn	4,427	4.90
Total votes		90,358	100.0
Republican gain from Democratic			

27th District (Genesee (Argentine Township, Clayton Township, Fenton, Fenton Township, Flint, Flint Township, Flushing, Flushing Township, Gaines Township, Genesee Township, Linden, Montrose Township, Mandy Township, Swartz Creek))
Party	Candidate	Votes	%
Democratic	John Gleason (incumbent)	51,666	66.45
Republican	Vernon Molnar	23,920	30.76
Libertarian	Pat Clawson	2,168	2.79
Total votes		77,754	100.0
Democratic hold			

28th District (Kent (Ada Township, Algoma Township, Alpine Township, Bowne Township, Byron Township, Caledonia Township, Cannon Township, Cedar Springs, Courtland Township, East Grand Rapids, Gaines Township, Grand Rapids Township, Nelson Township, Oakfield Township, Plainfield Township, Rockford, Solon Township, Spencer Township, Tyrone Township, Walker, Wyoming))
Party	Candidate	Votes	%
Republican	Mark Jansen (incumbent)	74,529	71.75
Democratic	Robin Golden	26,276	25.30
Libertarian	Jamie Lewis	3,069	2.95
Total votes		103,874	100.0
Republican hold			

29th District (Kent (Cascade Township, Grand Rapids, Grattan Township, Kentwood, Lowell, Lowell Township, Vergennes Township))
Party	Candidate	Votes	%
Republican	Dave Hildenbrand	41,042	51.77
Democratic	David LaGrand	36,830	46.46
Libertarian	Bill Gelineau	1,406	1.77
Total votes		79,278	100.0
Republican hold			

30th District (Ottawa, Kent (Grandville, Sparta Township))
Party	Candidate	Votes	%
Republican	Arlan Meekhof	74,409	76.30
Democratic	John Chester	20,061	20.57
Libertarian	Bruce Campbell	3,058	3.14
Total votes		97,528	100.0
Republican hold			

31st District (Arenac, Bay, Tuscola, Huron, and Sanilac Counties)
Party	Candidate	Votes	%
Republican	Mike Green	51,678	58.52
Democratic	Jeff Mayes	36,629	41.48
Total votes		88,307	100.0
Republican gain from Democratic			

32nd District (Gratiot and Saginaw Counties)
Party	Candidate	Votes	%
Republican	Roger Kahn, M.D. (incumbent)	43,577	55.45
Democratic	Debasish Mridha, M.D.	32,692	41.60
Constitution	Keith Beyerlein	1,618	2.06
Libertarian	Albert Chia	702	0.89
Total votes		78,589	100.0
Republican hold			

33rd District (Clinton, Ionia, Isabella, Montcalm Counties)
Party	Candidate	Votes	%
Republican	Judy Emmons	50,222	64.53
Democratic	James Hoisington	25,206	32.39
Libertarian	Joshua Lillie	2,403	3.09
Total votes		77,831	100.0
Republican hold			

34th District (Mason, Muskegon, Oceana, Newaygo Counties)
Party	Candidate	Votes	%
Republican	Goeff Hansen	49,065	58.11
Democratic	Mary Valentine	33,261	39.39
Libertarian	Nicholas Sundquist	2,108	2.50
Total votes		84,434	100.0
Republican hold			

35th District (Benzie, Clare, Kalkaska, Lake, Leelanau, Manistee, Mecosta, Missaukee, Osceola, Roscommon, Wexford Counties)
Party	Candidate	Votes	%
Republican	Darwin L. Booher	56,318	62.81
Democratic	Roger Dunigan	30,819	34.37
Libertarian	Allitta Hren	2,521	2.81
Total votes		89,658	100.0
Republican hold			

36th District (Alcona, Alpena, Crawford, Gladwin, Iosco, Midland, Montmorency, Ogemaw, Oscoda, Otsego Counties)
Party	Candidate	Votes	%
Republican	John Moolenaar	56,634	63.79
Democratic	Andy Neumann	32,154	36.21
Total votes		88,788	100.0
Republican hold			

37th District (Chippewa, Mackinac, Emmet, Cheboygan, Presque Isle, Charlevoix, Antrim, and Grand Traverse Counties)
Party	Candidate	Votes	%
Republican	Howard Walker	62,697	64.76
Democratic	Bob Carr	34,122	35.24
Total votes		96,819	100.0
Republican hold			

38th District (Keweenaw, Houghton, Ontonagon, Gogebic, Baraga, Iron, Marquette, Dickinson, Menominee, Delta, Alger, Schoolcraft and Luce Counties)
Party	Candidate	Votes	%
Republican	Tom Casperson	49,868	55.91
Democratic	Michael Lahti	39,320	44.09
Total votes		89,188	100.0
Republican gain from Democratic			

=== 27th District by-election ===
State Senator John Gleason resigned his seat to accept election as the Genesee County Clerk. This triggered a by-election, which was held May 7, 2013. Jim Ananich won the special election with 75.27% of the vote.

By-election in the 27th State Senate District
Party	Candidate	Votes	%
Democratic	Jim Ananich	8,728	75.27
Republican	Robert J. Daunt	2,640	22.77
Libertarian	Robert Nicholls	143	1.23
Green	Bobby Jones	80	0.69
Write-In		4	0.03
Total votes		11,595	100
Democratic hold			

== See also ==
- Michigan House of Representatives election, 2010
