= Michigan's 42nd House of Representatives district =

American legislative district

Michigan's 42nd State House of Representatives district
Representative
Matt Hall; R–Richland Township, Kalamazoo County
- Demographics: 86.5% White; 2.9% Black; 4.5% Hispanic; 1.1% Asian; 0.7% Other; 4.3% Multiracial
- Population (2024): 92,244

Michigan's 42nd House of Representatives district is a legislative district within the Michigan House of Representatives located in the counties of Allegan and Kalamazoo. The district was created in 1965, when the Michigan Supreme Court ordered the reapportionment of state legislative districts from a county-based system to a proportional one following the Supreme Court case Reynolds v. Sims. It is currently represented by Republican Matt Hall of Richland Township.

== List of representatives ==
Representative	Party	Years	Residence	Notes
Floyd E. Wagner	Republican	1965–1966	Cassopolis	Reapportioned from the former St. Joseph County district.
DeForrest Strang	Republican	1967–1976	Sturgis	
Mark Deli Siljander	Republican	1977–1981	Three Rivers	Resigned April 1981 after being elected to the 4th U.S. House district.
Harmon George Cropsey	Republican	1981 (Note: Elected in a 1981 special election to replace Rep. Mark Deli Siljander, who resigned.)–1982	Cass County	
Glenn S. Oxender	Republican	1983–1992	Sturgis	Redistricted to the 59th district.
Greg Kaza	Republican	1993–1998	Rochester Hills	Term limited.
Robert M. Gosselin	Republican	1999–2002	Troy	Redistricted to the 41st district.
Frank Accavitti Jr.	Democratic	2003–2008	Eastpointe	Term limited.
Harold L. Haugh	Democratic	2009–2012	Roseville	Redistricted to the 22nd district.
Bill Rogers	Republican	2013–2014	Brighton	Redistricted from the 66th district; term limited.
Lana Theis	Republican	2015–2018	Brighton	
Ann Bollin	Republican	2019–2022	Brighton	Redistricted to the 49th district.
Matt Hall	Republican	2023–present	Richland Township	Redistricted from the 63rd district.

== Historical district boundaries ==
Map	Description	Apportionment Plan	Notes
	Berrien County (part): Niles; Niles Township; Cass County (part): Calvin Township; Howard Township; Jefferson Township; Marcellus Township; Mason Township; Milton Township; Newberg Township; Ontwa Township; Porter Township; Volinia Township; St. Joseph County (part): Constantine Township; Fabius Township; Florence Township; Mottville Township; Sturgis; White Pigeon Township; Three Rivers; Sturgis Township	1964 Apportionment Plan	
	St. Joseph County (part): Excluding; Mendon Township; Leonidas Township; Fawn River Township; Cass County (part): Excluding; Milton Township (part); Silver Creek Township; Pokagon Township; Dowagiac; Van Buren County (part): Porter Township; Decatur Township; Hamilton Township; Keeler Township (part)	1972 Apportionment Plan	
	Cass County (part): Calvin Township; Howard Township; Jefferson Township; La Grange Township; Marcellus Township; Mason Township; Milton Township; Newberg Township; Ontwa Township; Penn Township; Porter Township; Volinia Township; St. Joseph County	1982 Apportionment Plan	
	Oakland County (part): Rochester Hills (part); Troy (part)	1992 Apportionment Plan	
	Macomb County (part): Eastpointe; Fraser (part); Roseville	2001 Apportionment Plan	
	Livingston County (part): Brighton; Brighton Township; Genoa Township; Green Oak Township; Hamburg Township; Putnam Township	2011 Apportionment Plan	
	Allegan County (part): Gun Plain Township; Otsego; Otsego Township (part); Plainwell; Kalamazoo County (part): Alamo Township; Brady Township; Comstock Township; Cooper Township; Galesburg; Kalamazoo Township (part); Oshtemo Township (part); Parchment; Pavilion Township; Prairie Ronde Township; Richland Township; Ross Township; Schoolcraft Township	2021 Apportionment Plan (Note: Referred to as the Hickory plan.)	

== Recent elections ==
=== 2020s ===
2026 Michigan House of Representatives election
Party	Candidate	Votes	%
Republican	Matt Hall (incumbent)	23,894	51.61
Democratic	Nick Rowe	22,406	48.39
Total votes		46,300	100
Republican hold			

2024 Michigan House of Representatives election
Party	Candidate	Votes	%
Republican	Matt Hall (incumbent)	30,999	57.46
Democratic	Austin Marsman	22,947	42.54
Total votes		53,946	100
Republican hold			

2022 Michigan House of Representatives election
Party	Candidate	Votes	%
Republican	Matt Hall	24,092	54.99
Democratic	Justin Mendoza	19,719	45.01
Total votes		43,811	100
Republican hold			

2020 Michigan House of Representatives election
Party	Candidate	Votes	%
Republican	Ann Bollin (incumbent)	39,730	63.21
Democratic	Donnie Bettes	23,123	36.79
Total votes		62,853	100
Republican hold			

=== 2010s ===
2018 Michigan House of Representatives election
Party	Candidate	Votes	%
Republican	Ann Bollin	29,897	60.0
Democratic	Mona M. Shand	19,940	40.0
Total votes		49,837	100
Republican hold			

2016 Michigan House of Representatives election
Party	Candidate	Votes	%
Republican	Lana Theis	34,015	63.6
Democratic	Timothy Johnson	17,309	32.4
Libertarian	Jonathan Elgas	2,167	4.1
Total votes		53,491	100
Republican hold			

2014 Michigan House of Representatives election
Party	Candidate	Votes	%
Republican	Lana Theis	23,477	65.2
Democratic	Timothy Johnson	12,544	34.8
Total votes		36,021	100
Republican hold			

2012 Michigan House of Representatives election
Party	Candidate	Votes	%
Republican	Bill Rogers	31,510	63.3
Democratic	Shanda Willis	16,476	33.1
Libertarian	James Lewis	1,830	3.7
Total votes		49,816	100
Republican gain from Democratic			

2010 Michigan House of Representatives election
Party	Candidate	Votes	%
Democratic	Harold Haugh	14,927	66.6
Republican	Stuart Jason	7,497	33.4
Total votes		22,424	100
Democratic hold			

2008 Michigan House of Representatives election
Party	Candidate	Votes	%
Democratic	Harold Haugh	26,789	70.4
Republican	Greg Fleming	9,697	25.5
Libertarian	Daniel Flamand	1,560	4.1
Total votes		38,046	100
Democratic hold			
