= Senator Cherry =

Senator Cherry may refer to:

- Deborah Cherry (born 1954), Michigan State Senate
- John D. Cherry (born 1951), Michigan State Senate
- John Daniel Cherry (born 1985), Michigan State Senate
- R. Gregg Cherry (1891–1957), North Carolina State Senate
