= Senator Cropsey =

Senator Cropsey may refer to:

- Alan Cropsey (born 1952), Michigan State Senate
- Harman B. Cropsey (c. 1775–1859), New York State Senate
- Harmon G. Cropsey (1917–2009), Michigan State Senate
