= Jack Minore =

American politician (1938–2021)

Member of the Michigan House of Representatives from the 49th district
- In office January 1, 1999 – December 31, 2004
- Preceded by: Robert L. Emerson
- Succeeded by: Lee Gonzales

Member of the Flint City Council
- In office 1983–1998
- Constituency: 7th Ward

Personal details
- Born: October 25, 1938 Flint, Michigan
- Died: September 21, 2021 (aged 82)
- Party: Democratic
- Relations: Hattie Marsh & Francis Oliver Minore, parents
- Education: Flint Junior College; University of Michigan–Flint; Eastern Michigan University
- Occupation: politician
- Profession: teacher

Jack Minore (October 25, 1938 – September 21, 2021) was an American politician. He was a Democratic Party member of the Michigan State House of Representatives from 1999 to 2004. He represented the 49th District, which is located in Genesee County and includes part of the city of Flint. He was a member of the Flint City Council from 1983 to 1998.

== Early life ==
Minore was on October 25, 1938, in Flint, Michigan, to Hattie Marsh Minore and Francis Oliver Minore as their youngest child. He grew up with three siblings, now all deceased. In 1957, he graduated from Flint Northern High School. He then attended Flint Junior College. He followed this up with bachelor's degree from the University of Michigan-Flint. He earned his master's degree from Eastern Michigan University a few years later. Minore was a teacher for 30 years in the City of Flint School District.

== Political career ==
Minore first ran for a Democratic nomination for Michigan state senate 29th District primary in 1970. In 1974, he was defeated in the race for 81st District state representative. In 1996, he was an alternate Michigan Democratic National Convention delegate. In 1983, he ran for the 7th Ward Flint City Council seat and won. He held the seat until 1998 when he was elected to the Michigan State House of Representatives. He served until time limits forced him out in 2004. In 2006, he ran for Michigan state senator in a crowded primary that included auto dealer Patsy Lou Williamson, but lost in the primary to John Gleason. Minore as a member of the Michigan State Compensation Commission in March 2009 where he objected to pay cuts for the governor, legislature and other high level government officials the Attorney General would make less than others in his office and favored a 5% cut. He had filed to run for the 7th Ward City Council seat.

== Death ==
Minore died on September 21, 2021, at the age of 82.

Political offices
Preceded by Robert L. Emerson	Michigan State Representative, 49th District; 1999-2004	Succeeded by Lee Gonzales
