= Lana Theis =

American politician (born 1965)

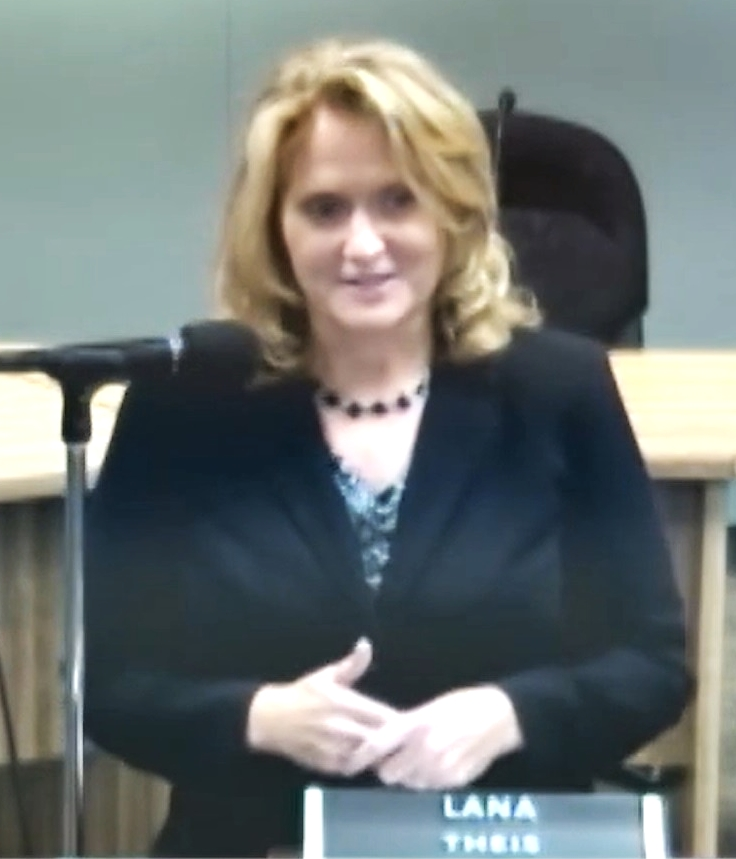

Member of the Michigan Senate from the 22nd district
- Incumbent
- Assumed office January 1, 2019
- Preceded by: Joe Hune
- Succeeded by: Mike Murphy (elect)

Member of the Michigan House of Representatives from the 42nd district
- In office January 1, 2015 – December 31, 2018
- Preceded by: Bill Rogers
- Succeeded by: Ann Bollin

Personal details
- Born: June 23, 1965 (age 61) Sturgis, Michigan, U.S.
- Party: Republican
- Education: California State University, Fullerton (BS)

Lana Theis (born June 23, 1965) is an American politician from Michigan. A member of the Republican Party, she has represented the 22nd district of the Michigan Senate since 2019. Theis was a member of the Michigan House of Representatives from 2015 to 2019.

== Early life and education ==
Theis was born on June 23, 1965, in Sturgis, Michigan. She earned a bachelor's degree in biology from California State University, Fullerton.

== Career ==
Theis was elected Brighton Township treasurer in 2008, and spent six years in that position. In 2014, she was elected to the Michigan House of Representatives as a Republican from the 42nd district, succeeding Bill Rogers, who was ineligible to run for reelection due to term limits. (Note: Theis resigned as township treasurer effective December 31, 2014, to take up her seat in the state House.) She was a member of the House from 2015 to 2019. In 2018, Theis was elected to the Michigan Senate.

Theis is among the most conservative members of the Michigan Legislature. She was a Ted Cruz delegate to the 2016 Republican National Convention.

Theis opposed the 2018 Michigan ballot measure to legalize the recreational use of marijuana by adults. She cosponsored an unsuccessful bill in 2018 to abolish Michigan's longstanding no-fault auto insurance system. She sponsored legislation in 2022 to ban red light cameras in Michigan.

In the 2020 presidential election, Joe Biden defeated Donald Trump; Biden won by three percentage points in Michigan. Trump subsequently launched an effort to overturn the election result and remain in power. In January 2021, Theis was one of 11 Republican Michigan state senators who promoted Trump's false claims of fraud in the 2020 election; in a letter sent to Congress on January 6, 2021, ahead of the 2021 United States Electoral College vote count, Theis and the other members of the group baselessly suggested that there were "credible allegations of election-related concerns surrounding fraud and irregularities."

Theis has condemned the January 6 United States Capitol attack, saying, "There is no defense for these acts of violence, and they need to stop immediately". Democrats said that Theis and other Republicans, by validating Trump's false claims, fostered the environment that led to the attack. In June 2021, the Republican-controlled Michigan Senate Oversight Committee (of which Theis was the vice chairwoman) issued a report finding no support for Trump's false claims of fraud. The report's publication angered Trump.

In 2022, Theis wrote in a campaign fundraising email that State Senator Mallory McMorrow and other Democrats wanted to "groom and sexualize kindergartners". Her claim prompted criticism, including a denunciation from McMorrow on the Senate floor, who criticized Theis for engaging in a "hollow, hateful scheme" to raise money. Theis did not respond to McMorrow's speech, and did not apologize.

In 2022, Theis was reelected to the state Senate after she was challenged in the Republican primary election by Mike Detmer, a far-right conspiracy theorist endorsed by Trump.

== Personal life ==
Theis and her husband, Samuel, have two children and live in Brighton, Michigan.
