= Richard J. Allen (politician) =

American politician (1933–2021)

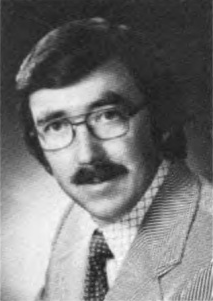

Member of the Michigan Senate from the 30th district
- In office January 1, 1975 – December 31, 1982
- Preceded by: Bill Ballenger
- Succeeded by: Alan Cropsey

Member of the Michigan House of Representatives from the 88th district
- In office January 1, 1969 – December 31, 1972
- Preceded by: Lester J. Allen
- Succeeded by: Stanley M. Powell

Personal details
- Born: August 6, 1933 Ithaca, Michigan, U.S.
- Died: December 20, 2021 (aged 88)
- Party: Republican
- Profession: Veterinarian

Richard J. Allen (August 6, 1933 – December 20, 2021) was an American politician who was a Republican member of both houses of the Michigan Legislature between 1969 and 1982.

Allen was elected to the Michigan House of Representatives in 1968 to succeed his father, Lester Allen. After serving two terms, Allen was defeated in the 1972 primary election. Two years later, he won election to the Michigan Senate, served two terms, and was defeated in the 1982 primary.

He was an unsuccessful candidate for Congress twice: in 1980, losing to Donald J. Albosta, and 1990, losing to Dave Camp in the primary. Allen was also a college professor, and a member of the Farm Bureau, Rotary, the Audubon Society, and the Sierra Club.

Allen was executive director of the Michigan State Fair from 1990 to 1993. He is also the namesake of the Dick Allen Lansing to Mackinaw Bike Tour (DALMAC).

Allen died on December 20, 2021, at the age of 88.
