= Valde Garcia =

American politician

Member of the Michigan Senate from the 22nd district
- In office January 1, 2003 – December 31, 2010
- Preceded by: William Van Regenmorter
- Succeeded by: Joe Hune

Member of the Michigan Senate from the 26th district
- In office April 17, 2001 – December 31, 2002
- Preceded by: Mike Rogers
- Succeeded by: Deborah Cherry

Member of the Michigan House of Representatives from the 86th district
- In office January 1, 1999 – April 17, 2001
- Preceded by: Alan Cropsey
- Succeeded by: Scott Hummel

Personal details
- Born: November 27, 1958 (age 67) St. Johns, Michigan, U.S.
- Party: Republican
- Spouse: Karla
- Education: Cedarville University (BA)

Military service
- Branch/service: United States Army

Valdemar "Valde" Garcia (born 1958) is an American politician who served as a member of the Michigan Senate from 2003 to 2010 and Michigan House of Representatives from 1999 to 2001.

== Early life and education ==
Garcia was born in St. Johns, Michigan. In 1981, he earned a Bachelor of Arts degree in political science and history from Cedarville University.

== Career ==
Garcia then served for the next ten years in the United States Army, reaching the rank of captain. He served in the Michigan Army National Guard. From 1991 until 1995 Garcia served on the staff of various Michigan state senators, including Doug Carl and Harmon G. Cropsey.

From 1995 to 1997 Garcia was a teacher at Laingsburg Christian School in Laingsburg, Michigan.

On November 3, 1998, Garcia won the election and became a Republican member of the Michigan House of Representatives for District 86. Garcia defeated Jack M. Brown and Will White. Garcia served until 2001.

== Personal life ==
Garcia is a Baptist. He and his wife have two children. Garcia and his family live in Howell, Michigan.

Michigan House of Representatives
Preceded by Alan Cropsey	Member of the Michigan House of Representatives from the 86th district 1999–2001	Succeeded by Scott Hummel
Michigan Senate
Preceded by Mike Rogers	Member of the Michigan Senate from the 26th district 2001–2003	Succeeded by Deborah Cherry
Preceded by William Van Regenmorter	Member of the Michigan Senate from the 22nd district 2003–2011	Succeeded by Joe Hune
