= Jim Slezak =

American politician

Member of the Michigan House of Representatives from the 50th district
- In office 2008–2010
- Preceded by: Ted Hammon
- Succeeded by: Charles Smiley

Personal details
- Born: August 29, 1966 (age 60) Muskegon, Michigan
- Party: Republican
- Other political affiliations: Democratic (former)
- Education: Yale University

James Michael Slezak is an American politician who served in the Michigan state House of Representatives.

== Political career ==
In 2008, Slezak won election to the Michigan state House of Representatives from the 50th District, defeating incumbent Ted Hammon in the Democratic primary.

In 2010, Slezak ran in the 26th State Senate District to replace the term-limited Deborah Cherry. He lost the primary to Paula Zelenko, who in turn lost the general election to Republican David B. Robertson.

Switching parties, Slezak in 2012 ran as a Republican for the 5th Congressional District seat being vacated after 36 years by Dale Kildee; he was defeated in the general election by Kildee's nephew Dan.

Political offices
Preceded by Ted Hammon	Michigan Representative; 50th District; 2009-2010	Succeeded by Charles Smiley
