= Michigan's 27th Senate district =

American legislative district

Michigan's 27th State Senate district
Senator
John Daniel Cherry; D–Flint
- Demographics: 60% White; 28.1% Black; 4.7% Hispanic; 1.4% Asian; 0.3% Native American; 0.7% Other; 4.9% Multiracial
- Population (2024): 257,557

Michigan's 27th Senate district is one of 38 districts in the Michigan Senate. The 27th district was created by the 1850 Michigan Constitution, as the 1835 constitution only permitted a maximum of eight senate districts. It has been represented by John Daniel Cherry, a member of the Democratic party, since 2023, after he succeeded Jim Ananich.

== Geography ==
District 27 encompasses part of Genesee County.

=== 2011 Apportionment Plan ===
District 27, as dictated by the 2011 Apportionment Plan, was based in Flint, also covering the surrounding Genesee County communities of Burton, Clio, Mount Morris, Swartz Creek, Flint Township, Mount Morris Township, Genesee Township, and Vienna Township.

The district was located entirely within Michigan's 5th congressional district, and overlapped with the 34th, 48th, 49th, and 50th districts of the Michigan House of Representatives.

== List of senators ==
Senator	Party	Dates	Residence	Notes
William McCauley	Democratic	1853–1854	Brighton	
John Kenyon	Democratic	1855–1856	Tyrone	
John Merritt Lamb Sr.	Republican	1857–1858	Dryden	
William S. Mills	Republican	1859–1860	Lexington	
Daniel G. Wilder	Republican	1861–1862	Watrousville	
David H. Jerome	Republican	1863–1866	Saginaw	
Nathan B. Bradley	Republican	1867–1868	Bay City	
Charles Blunt Mills	Republican	1869–1870	Mayville	
Harrison H. Wheeler	Democratic	1871–1872	Wenona	
Henry H. Hinds	Republican	1873–1874	Stanton	
Allen B. Morse	Democratic	1875–1876	Ionia	
Marsden C. Burch	Republican	1877–1878	Hersey	
William E. Ambler	Republican	1879–1882	Pentwater	
Fitch Phelps	Republican	1883–1886	Big Rapids	
Ansel W. Westgate	Republican	1887–1888	Cheboygan	
John G. Berry	Republican	1889–1890	Otsego County	
James E. Holcomb	Democratic	1891–1892	Wolverine	
William J. Mears	Republican	1893–1894	Boyne Falls	
Clyde C. Chittenden	Republican	1895–1896	Cadillac	
George G. Covell	Republican	1897–1898	Traverse City	Resigned after appointed U.S. Attorney for the Western District of Michigan.
James W. Milliken	Republican	1898–1900	Traverse City	
Ambrose E. Palmer	Republican	1901–1902	Kalkaska	
Orlando C. Moffatt	Republican	1903–1906	Traverse City	
Fred C. Wetmore	Republican	1907–1910	Cadillac	
Robert E. Walter	Republican	1911–1916	Traverse City	
William W. Smith	Republican	1917–1920	Traverse City	
Albert J. Engel	Republican	1921–1922	Lake City	
William L. Case	Republican	1923–1926	Benzonia	
Albert J. Engel	Republican	1927–1932	Lake City	
Felix H. H. Flynn	Republican	1933–1940	Cadillac	
James T. Milliken	Republican	1941–1950	Traverse City	
Felix H. H. Flynn	Republican	1951–1953	Cadillac	Died in office.
John Minnema	Republican	1954–1960	Traverse City	
William G. Milliken	Republican	1961–1964	Traverse City	
William Romano	Democratic	1965–1966	Warren	Died in office.
James D. Gray	Democratic	1967–1974	Warren	
John T. Bowman	Democratic	1975–1977	Roseville	Resigned to become a lobbyist.
Art Miller Jr.	Democratic	1977–1994	Warren	
Dan DeGrow	Republican	1995–2002	Port Huron	
Robert L. Emerson	Democratic	2003–2006	Flint	
John J. Gleason	Democratic	2007–2013	Flushing	Resigned after elected Genesee County Clerk/Register of Deeds.
Jim Ananich	Democratic	2013–2022	Flint	
John Daniel Cherry	Democratic	2023–present	Flint	

== Recent election results ==
=== 2020s ===
2026 Michigan Senate election
Primary election
Party	Candidate	Votes	%
General election
Democratic	John D. Cherry (incumbent)	71,771	66.63
Republican	Bill Bain	35,949	33.37
Total votes		107,720	100
Democratic hold			

2022 Michigan Senate election, District 27
Primary election
Party	Candidate	Votes	%
Democratic	John D. Cherry	17,503	64.4
Democratic	Monica S. Galloway	6,756	24.9
Democratic	Bill Swanson	1,552	5.7
Democratic	David L. Davenport	1,366	5.0
Total votes		27,177	100
Republican	Aaron R. Gardner	8,514	58.2
Republican	Christina Hickson	6,115	41.8
Total votes		14,629	100
General election
Democratic	John D. Cherry	64,189	64.1
Republican	Aaron R. Gardner	35,972	35.9
Total votes		100,161	100
Democratic hold			

=== 2018 ===
2018 Michigan Senate election, District 27
Party	Candidate	Votes	%
Democratic	Jim Ananich (incumbent)	59,108	71.2
Republican	Donna Kekesis	23,942	28.8
Total votes		83,050	100
Democratic hold			

=== 2014 ===
2014 Michigan Senate election, District 27
Party	Candidate	Votes	%
Democratic	Jim Ananich	51,291	77.3
Republican	Brendt Gerics	15,062	22.7
Total votes		66,353	100
Democratic hold			

=== 2013 special ===
In January 2013, incumbent senator John J. Gleason assumed office as Clerk/Register of Deeds for Genesee County, triggering a special election that May.

2013 Michigan Senate special election, District 27
Primary election
Party	Candidate	Votes	%
Democratic	Jim Ananich	8,472	51.4
Democratic	Woodrow Stanley	6,237	37.8
Democratic	Ted Henry	1,409	8.5
Democratic	Chris Del Morone	231	1.4
Democratic	Lawrence Woods	148	0.9
Total votes		16,497	100
Republican	Robert Daunt	1,025	54.6
Republican	Adam Ford	851	45.4
Total votes		1,876	100
General election
Democratic	Jim Ananich	8,728	75.3
Republican	Robert Daunt	2,640	22.8
Libertarian	Robert Nicholls (write-in)	143	1.2
Green	Bobby Jones	80	0.7
Total votes		11,591	100
Democratic hold			

=== Federal and statewide results ===
Year	Office	Results
2020	President	Biden 62.3 – 36.2%
2018	Senate	Stabenow 66.2 – 31.3%
2018	Governor	Whitmer 68.3 – 28.7%
2016	President	Clinton 62.2 – 33.5%
2014	Senate	Peters 75.6 – 20.9%
2014	Governor	Schauer 71.9 – 25.7%
2012	President	Obama 74.3 – 24.8%
2012	Senate	Stabenow 78.2 – 18.8%

== Historical district boundaries ==
Map	Description	Apportionment Plan	Notes
	Macomb County (part); Armada Township; Bruce Township; Center Line; Clinton Township; Lenox Township; Macomb Township; Memphis; Mount Clemens; Ray Township; Richmond Township; Shelby Township; Sterling Township; Utica; Warren; Washington Township; St. Clair County (part); Memphis	1964 Apportionment Plan	
	Macomb County (part); Clinton Township (part); Fraser; Mount Clemens; Roseville; Warren (part)	1972 Apportionment Plan	
	Macomb County (part); Center Line; Fraser; Roseville; Warren	1982 Apportionment Plan	
	Lapeer County; Sanilac County; St. Clair County	1992 Apportionment Plan	
	Genesee County (part); Argentine Township; Clayton Township; Fenton; Fenton Township; Flint; Flint Township; Flushing; Flushing Township; Gaines Township; Genesee Township; Linden; Montrose; Montrose Township; Mundy Township; Swartz Creek	2001 Apportionment Plan	
	Genesee County (part); Burton; Clio; Flint; Flint Township; Forest Township; Genesee Township; Mount Morris; Mount Morris Township; Richfield Township; Swartz Creek; Thetford Township; Vienna Township	2011 Apportionment Plan	
