= Floyd E. Wagner =

American politician (1898–1983)

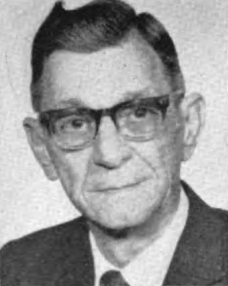

Member of the Michigan House of Representatives from the 42nd district
- In office January 13, 1965 – December 31, 1966
- Preceded by: District established
- Succeeded by: DeForrest Strang

Member of the Michigan House of Representatives from the St. Joseph County district
- In office January 14, 1959 – December 31, 1964
- Preceded by: John W. Fletcher
- Succeeded by: District abolished

Personal details
- Born: June 13, 1898 Cass County, Michigan
- Died: September 28, 1983 (aged 85) Cassopolis, Michigan
- Party: Republican

Floyd E. Wagner (June 13, 1898 – September 28, 1983) was an American politician from Michigan.

== Early life and education ==
Wagner was born on June 13, 1898, in Cass County, Michigan. Wagner attended the South Bend College of Commerce.

== Career ==
Wagner served as chairman of the War Price Rationing Board. Wagner served as postmaster in Vandalia for five years. Wagner served as the clerk of Cass County from 1941 to 1958. Wagner served in other positions in local government, and served on various school, village and township boards. On November 4, 1958, Wagner was elected to the Michigan House of Representatives, where represented the St. Joseph County district from January 14, 1959, to December 31, 1964. In 1965, the state house went from county based districts to numbered districts. For Wagner's last term in the state house, Wagner represented the newly created 42nd district from January 13, 1965, to December 31, 1966.

== Personal life ==
On September 8, 1917, Wagner married Esther Z. English. Together, they had four children. Wagner was a Freemason and a member of the Elks.

== Death ==
Wagner died in Cassopolis, Michigan, on September 28, 1983.
