= Sheryl Kennedy =

American politician

Member of the Michigan House of Representatives from the 48th district
- In office January 1, 2019 – January 1, 2021
- Preceded by: Pam Faris
- Succeeded by: David Martin

Personal details
- Party: Democratic
- Spouse: Mike
- Children: 3
- Education: Oakland University
- Website: Elect Sheryl Kennedy

Sheryl Yvonne Kennedy is a former Democratic member of the Michigan House of Representatives.

== Career ==
Kennedy earned her Ph.D. in Educational Leadership and Administration in 2011. Kennedy became a school administrator, serving as principal in Walled Lake Consolidated School District since 2013.

Kennedy was defeated by David Martin for re-election in 2020.

Kennedy formerly served as the chairperson for the Genesee County Democratic Party.

Political offices
Preceded by Pam Faris	Michigan Representatives; 48th District; 2018–present	Succeeded by Incumbent
