= Pam Faris =

American politician

Member of the Michigan House of Representatives from the 48th district
- In office January 1, 2013 – January 1, 2019
- Preceded by: Richard Hammel
- Succeeded by: Sheryl Kennedy

Second Lady of Michigan
- In role January 1, 2003 – January 1, 2011
- Preceded by: Pam Posthumus
- Succeeded by: Julie Calley

Personal details
- Born: February 15, 1957 (age 69) Flint, Michigan, U.S.
- Party: Democratic
- Spouse: John D. Cherry Jr.
- Children: 2
- Relatives: John Cherry III (son), Deborah Cherry (sister-in-law)
- Education: Mott Community College, Baker College

Pam Faris (born February 15, 1957) is a former American politician from Michigan. Faris is a former Democratic member of Michigan House of Representatives for District 48 and a former Second Lady of Michigan.

== Early life ==
On February 15, 1957, Faris was born in Flint, Michigan. In 1975, Faris graduated from Powers Catholic High School in Flint, Michigan.

== Education ==
Faris earned an honorary associate degree from Mott Community College in Flint, Michigan. Faris earned a bachelor's degree in business administration-human resources from Baker College in Flint, Michigan.

== Career ==
Faris started her career at General Motors at Fisher Body. Faris was a case coordinator and a jury coordinator with the Genesee Circuit Court system. In 2003, Faris retired as a jury coordinator.

In 2008, Faris became the CEO of the MDP-MI Blue Tiger until 2009.

In 2010, Faris was appointed to become a member of the board of trustees for Mott Community College.

On November 6, 2012, Faris won the election and became a Democratic member of the Michigan House of Representatives for District 48. Faris defeated Jeffrey Woolman with 63.77% of the votes. On November 4, 2014, as an incumbent, Faris won the election and continued serving District 48. Faris defeated Stephanie K. Stikovich with 62.33% of the votes. On November 8, 2016, as an encumber, Far is won the election and continued serving District 48. Far is defeated Joseph Reno with 53.82% of the vote.

== Awards ==
- 2019 Outstanding Alum Award. Presented by Mott Community College.

== Personal life ==
Faris' husband is John D. Cherry Jr., a former lieutenant governor. They have two children, Meghan and John Cherry III. Faris and her family live in Clio, Michigan. Faris' sister-in-law is Deborah Cherry, a politician in Michigan.

== See also ==
- 2012 Michigan House of Representatives election
- 2014 Michigan House of Representatives election
- 2016 Michigan House of Representatives election
