= Jennifer Conlin =

American politician

Member of the Michigan House of Representatives from the 48th district
- Incumbent
- Assumed office January 1, 2023
- Preceded by: David Martin (redistricting)

Personal details
- Born: Washtenaw County, Michigan, U.S.
- Party: Democratic
- Spouse: Daniel Rivkin (m. 1990)
- Children: 3
- Education: University of Michigan (BA); Northwestern University (MA)

Jennifer Conlin is an American journalist and serving as a member of the Michigan House of Representatives since 2023, representing the 48th district. She is a member of the Democratic Party.

== Early life and education ==
Conlin was born and raised in Washtenaw County, Michigan. She attended the University of Michigan where she earned a bachelor's degree in English, and earned her graduate degree in journalism from Northwestern University.

== Career ==
Conlin held a career in journalism for over three decades, living abroad to write news articles and feature stories from around the world, primarily writing for The New York Times. She works alongside her husband, Daniel Rivkin, whom she met in college and is a fellow journalist. Since 2010, they settled in Ann Arbor to care for Conlin's parents and continued writing about stories throughout Michigan, including for Hour Detroit. Topics of her stories include small businesses, healthcare, culture, and economic development. She was one of the first reporters to cover the 2021 Oxford High School shooting.

=== Michigan House of Representatives ===
In the 2022 elections for the Michigan House of Representatives, redistricting created an open seat in part of the City of Ann Arbor, some suburbs, and parts of rural Livingston County. Conlin announced her candidacy for the swing district, facing general election opposition from Republican nominee Jason Woolford, a U.S. Marine Corps veteran from Howell. In one of the closest races in the chamber, Conlin defeated Woolford with 53.1% of the vote.

Conlin took office to the 102nd Michigan Legislature on January 1, 2023. She chairs the Military, Veterans, and Homeland Security committee, and is a member of the committees on Education, Health Policy, and Transportation.

Conlin was reelected in 2024.

== Personal life ==
Conlin married Daniel Rivkin in 1990 after they met in college. They have three children and currently reside in Ann Arbor.

== Electoral history ==
2022 Michigan's 48th House of Representatives district Democratic primary election
Party	Candidate	Votes	%
Democratic	Jennifer Conlin	11,854	100.0%
Total votes		11,854	100.0%

2022 Michigan's 48th House of Representatives district election
Party	Candidate	Votes	%
Democratic	Jennifer Conlin	27,376	53.08%
Republican	Jason Woolford	23,622	45.80%
Green	Eric Borregard	579	1.12%
Total votes		51,577	100.0

2024 Michigan's 48th House of Representatives district Democratic primary election
Party	Candidate	Votes	%
Democratic	Jennifer Conlin	11,329	100.0%
Total votes		11,329	100.0%

2024 Michigan's 48th House of Representatives district election
Party	Candidate	Votes	%
Democratic	Jennifer Conlin (incumbent)	31,153	51.50%
Republican	Brian Ignatowski	28,471	47.07%
Green	Eric Borregard	863	1.43%
Total votes		60,487	100.0

Michigan House of Representatives
Preceded by David Martin	Member of the Michigan House of Representatives from the 48th district 2023–present	Incumbent
