= Tim Sneller =

American politician (1956–2024)

Member of the Michigan House of Representatives from the 50th district
- In office January 1, 2017 – December 31, 2022
- Preceded by: Charles Smiley
- Succeeded by: Bob Bezotte

Personal details
- Born: June 20, 1956 Flint, Michigan, U.S.
- Died: July 11, 2024 (aged 68)
- Party: Democratic
- Education: University of Michigan–Flint

Timothy P. Sneller (June 20, 1956 – July 11, 2024) was an American politician who served in the Michigan House of Representatives from 2017 to 2022, representing the 50th District as a member of the United States Democratic Party.

Prior to his election to the legislature, Sneller worked on the legislative staffs of various state representatives and senators in the Genesee County area.

He was first elected in the 2016 elections, and was reelected to a second term in office in 2018. In his first term in office he introduced a bill to ban non-therapeutic debarking of dogs, and was a supporter of Adam Zemke's bill to ban LGBT conversion therapy.

Sneller was openly gay.

He died on July 11, 2024, at the age of 68. At the time of his death, Sneller was the only Democratic candidate for the 68th district of the state House. The Michigan Democratic State Central Committee attempted to replace Sneller on the August primary ballot with Matt Schlinker, who announced his candidacy on July 28, however Judge James Robert Redford ruled that they attempted to do so too late, as early voting had already begun. Sneller's name remained on the ballot, and he received over 6,000 votes.
