= John Daniel Cherry =

American politician

Member of the Michigan Senate from the 27th district
- Incumbent
- Assumed office January 1, 2023
- Preceded by: Jim Ananich

Member of the Michigan House of Representatives from the 49th district
- In office January 1, 2019 – January 1, 2023
- Preceded by: Phil Phelps
- Succeeded by: Ann Bollin

Personal details
- Born: May 30, 1985 (age 41) Clio, Michigan, U.S.
- Party: Democratic
- Spouse: Teresa Villacorta
- Children: 2
- Parents: John Darrell Cherry Jr. (father); Pam Faris (mother)
- Relatives: Deborah Cherry (aunt)
- Education: University of Michigan (BA, MPP)
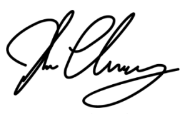
- Signature
- Website: Campaign website

John Daniel Cherry (born May 30, 1985) is an American politician. He is the son of politicians John Darrell Cherry Jr. and Pam Faris, and the nephew of politician Deborah Cherry. He is a member of the Michigan Senate from the 27th district and is a member of the Democratic party. He previously served two terms as a member of the Michigan House of Representatives from the 49th district.

Cherry earned a Bachelor of Arts in environmental studies and a Master of Public Policy in 2009 from the University of Michigan. Cherry previously worked for the Michigan Department of Natural Resources and was the secretary for the Flint Master Plan Advisory Committee. Cherry and his wife Teresa Villacorta founded Flint Coffee Company, which imports from her family in her native Peru. He is Episcopalian.
