= Jason Woolford =

American politician

Member of the Michigan House of Representatives from the 50th district
- Incumbent
- Assumed office January 1, 2025
- Preceded by: Bob Bezotte

Personal details
- Born: Howell, Michigan
- Party: Republican

Jason Michael Woolford is an American politician serving as a member of the Michigan House of Representatives since January 2025, representing the 50th district. He is a member of the Republican Party.

== Political career ==
In 2022, Woolford ran for the 48th district, losing to Democrat Jennifer Conlin.

In 2024, Woolford challenged the 50th district's incumbent, Bob Bezotte, in the Republican primary. He defeated Bezotte in the primary with 33.63% of the vote. He defeated Democrat Austin Breuer in the general election.

== Personal life ==
Woolford lives in Howell, Michigan. He served in the United States Marine Corps from 1991 to 1994.

== Electoral history ==
2022 Michigan's 48th House of Representatives district Republican primary election
Party	Candidate	Votes	%
Republican	Jason Woolford	6,541	53.45%
Republican	Jason Negri	5,697	46.55%
Total votes		12,238	100.0%

2022 Michigan's 48th House of Representatives district election
Party	Candidate	Votes	%
Democratic	Jennifer Conlin	27,376	53.08%
Republican	Jason Woolford	23,622	45.80%
Green	Eric Borregard	579	1.12%
Total votes		51,577	100.0

2024 Michigan's 50th House of Representatives district Republican primary election
Party	Candidate	Votes	%
Republican	Jason Woolford	4,723	33.63%
Republican	Bob Bezotte (incumbent)	4,247	30.24%
Republican	Dominic Restuccia	3,135	22.32%
Republican	Kristina Lyke	1,939	13.81%
Total votes		14,044	100.0%

2024 Michigan's 50th House of Representatives district election
Party	Candidate	Votes	%
Republican	Jason Woolford	40,119	67.64%
Democratic	Austin Breuer	19,193	32.36%
Total votes		59,312	100.0
