= Michigan's 48th House of Representatives district =

American legislative district

Michigan's 48th State House of Representatives district
Representative
Jennifer Conlin; D–Ann Arbor
- Demographics: 83.5% White; 2% Black; 2.9% Hispanic; 7% Asian; 0.1% Native American; 0.3% Other; 4.2% Multiracial
- Population (2024): 92,396

Michigan's 48th House of Representatives district is a legislative district within the Michigan House of Representatives located in the counties of Jackson, Livingston, and Washtenaw. The district was created in 1965, when the Michigan Supreme Court ordered the reapportionment of state legislative districts from a county-based system to a proportional one following the Supreme Court case Reynolds v. Sims. It is currently represented by Democrat Jennifer Conlin of Ann Arbor.

== List of representatives ==
Representative	Party	Years	Residence	Notes
W. Scott Ensign	Democratic	1965–1966	Battle Creek	
Gustave J. Groat Sr.	Republican	1967–1972	Battle Creek	
Paul A. Rosenbaum	Democratic	1973–1978	Battle Creek	
Richard Fitzpatrick	Democratic	1979–1982	Battle Creek	
Donald H. Gilmer	Republican	1983–1992	Augusta	
Floyd Clack	Democratic	1993–1996	Flint	
Vera B. Rison	Democratic	1997–2002	Mount Morris	
John J. Gleason	Democratic	2003–2006	Flushing	
Richard Hammel	Democratic	2007–2012	Mount Morris	
Pam Faris	Democratic	2013–2018	Clio	
Sheryl Kennedy	Democratic	2019–2021	Davison	
David Martin	Republican	2021–2022	Davison	
Jennifer Conlin	Democratic	2023–present	Ann Arbor	

== Historical district boundaries ==
Map	Description	Apportionment Plan	Notes
	Calhoun County (part): Battle Creek; Bedford Township; Convis Township; Emmett Township; Pennfield Township	1964 Apportionment Plan	
	Calhoun County (part): Battle Creek; Battle Creek Township (part); Bedford Township; Convis Township; Emmett Township (part); Pennfield Township; Springfield	1972 Apportionment Plan	
	Calhoun County (part): Bedford Township; Battle Creek; Battle Creek Township (part); Springfield; Kalamazoo County (part): Brady Township; Charleston Township; Climax Township; Comstock Township; Galesburg; Pavilion Township; Richland Township; Ross Township; Wakeshma Township	1982 Apportionment Plan	
	Genesee County (part): Atlas Township; Clio; Davison; Davison Township; Flushing; Flushing Township; Forest Township; Montrose; Montrose Township; Richfield Township; Thetford Township; Vienna Township	1992 Apportionment Plan	
	Genesee County (part): Clio; Flushing; Flushing Township; Forest Township; Montrose; Montrose Township; Mount Morris; Mount Morris Township; Thetford Township; Vienna Township	2001 Apportionment Plan	
	Genesee County (part): Clio; Davison; Davison Township; Forest Township; Genesee Township; Montrose; Montrose Township; Richfield Township; Thetford Township; Vienna Township	2011 Apportionment Plan	
	Jackson County (part): Waterloo Township; Livingston County (part): Genoa Township; Hamburg Township; Putnam Township (part); Washtenaw County (part): Ann Arbor (part); Ann Arbor Charter Township (part); Dexter Township; Lyndon Township (part); Northfield Township; Scio Township (part); Sylvan Township (part); Webster Township	2021 Apportionment Plan (Note: Referred to as the Hickory plan.)	

== Recent elections ==
=== 2020s ===
2026 Michigan House of Representatives election
Party	Candidate	Votes	%
Democratic	Jennifer A. Conlin (incumbent)	29,774	55.41
Republican	Brian Ignatowski	23,956	44.59
Total votes		53,730	100
Democratic hold			

2024 Michigan House of Representatives election
Party	Candidate	Votes	%
Democratic	Jennifer A. Conlin (incumbent)	31,153	51.5
Republican	Brian Ignatowski	28,471	47.07
Green	Eric Borregard	863	1.43
Total votes		60,487	100
Democratic hold			

2022 Michigan House of Representatives election
Party	Candidate	Votes	%
Democratic	Jennifer A. Conlin	27,376	53.08
Republican	Jason Woolford	23,622	45.8
Green	Eric Borregard	579	1.12
Total votes		51,577	100
Democratic gain from Republican			

2020 Michigan House of Representatives election
Party	Candidate	Votes	%
Republican	David W. Martin	24,796	50.5
Democratic	Sheryl Y. Kennedy (incumbent)	24,307	49.5
Total votes		49,103	100
Republican gain from Democratic			

=== 2010s ===
2018 Michigan House of Representatives election
Party	Candidate	Votes	%
Democratic	Sheryl Y. Kennedy	19,998	54.83
Republican	Al Hardwick	16,474	45.17
Total votes		36,472	100
Democratic hold			

2016 Michigan House of Representatives election
Party	Candidate	Votes	%
Democratic	Pam Faris	22,888	53.82%
Republican	Joseph Reno	19,641	46.18%
Total votes		42,529	100.00%
Democratic hold			

2014 Michigan House of Representatives election
Party	Candidate	Votes	%
Democratic	Pam Faris	17,628	62.33
Republican	Stephanie Stikovich	10,652	37.67
Total votes		28,280	100.0
Democratic hold			

2012 Michigan House of Representatives election
Party	Candidate	Votes	%
Democratic	Pam Faris	27,013	63.77
Republican	Jeffrey Woolman	15,344	36.23
Total votes		42,357	100.0
Democratic hold			

2010 Michigan House of Representatives election
Party	Candidate	Votes	%
Democratic	Richard Hammel	15,322	57.34
Republican	Susan Culver	11,401	42.66
Total votes		26,723	100.0
Democratic hold			

=== 2000s ===
2008 Michigan House of Representatives election
Party	Candidate	Votes	%
Democratic	Richard Hammel	28,245	67.34
Republican	Ralph Burger	13,698	32.66
Total votes		41,943	100.0
Democratic hold			
