= Lee Gonzales =

American politician from Michigan

Member of the Michigan House of Representatives from the 49th district
- In office January 1, 2005 – December 31, 2010
- Preceded by: Jack Minore
- Succeeded by: Jim Ananich

Personal details
- Born: February 19, 1950 (age 76) Floresville, Texas
- Party: Democratic
- Spouse: Brenda Gonzales
- Children: 3
- Education: University of Michigan-Flint
- Occupation: politician

Lee Gonzales (born 1950) is an American politician from the Michigan. Gonzales is a former Democratic Party member of Michigan State House of Representatives. He represented the 49th District, which is located in Genesee County and includes part of the city of Flint.

== Early life ==
On February 19. 1950, Gonzales was born in Floresville, Texas.

== Education ==
In 1979, Gonzales earned a Bachelor of Arts degree in Urban Studies/Urban Administration in University of Michigan-Flint. In 1985, Gonzales earned a Master's degree in Public Administration from the University of Michigan-Flint. In 2003, Gonzales earned completed a program in Civic involvement at Harvard University's John F. Kennedy School of Government.

== Career ==
Gonzales served as assistant director for the Spanish Speaking Information Center in Flint.

He formerly served as Michigan Department of Agriculture administrator, Gov. James J. Blanchard's office liaison, U.S. Representative Dale E. Kildee's staff assistant and 13 years in Genesee County, Michigan government.

In 1997, Gonzales became an Assistant Treasurer of Genesee County, Michigan, until 2004.

On November 2, 2004, Gonzales won the election and became a Democratic member of Michigan House of Representatives for District 49. Gonzales defeated Dan Parks with 69.92% of the votes. Gonzales served as chairman of the House Transportation Subcommittee, vice-chairman of the Higher Education Subcommittee and on the Joint Capital Outlay Subcommittee. On November 7, 2006, as an incumbent, Gonzales won the election and continued serving District 49. Gonzales defeated Bill Kelly with 75.23% of the votes. On November 4, 2008, Gonzales won the election and continued serving District 49. Gonzales defeated Aron Steven Gerics with 100% of the votes. In 2010, due to term limit, Gonzales did not campaign for District 49. He was succeeded by Jim Ananich.

On August 3, 2010, Gonzales ran for the vacated County Treasurer position unsuccessfully. Gonzales was defeated by Deborah Cherry.

== Personal life ==
Gonzales' wife is Brenda Gonzales. They have three children. Gonzales and his family live in Flint, Michigan.
