= Ann Bollin =

American politician in Michigan

Member of the Michigan House of Representatives
- Incumbent
- Assumed office January 1, 2019
- Preceded by: Lana Theis
- Constituency: 42nd district (2019–2022); 49th district (2023–present)

Personal details
- Born: August 18, 1960 (age 66)
- Party: Republican
- Spouse: Tim
- Children: 3

Ann Marie Bollin (born August 18, 1960) is an American politician serving as a member of the Michigan House of Representatives since 2019, currently representing the 49th district. A member of the Republican Party, Bollin previously served as the Brighton Township Clerk from 2003 to 2018.

== Education ==
Bollin attended Central Michigan University. Bollin was a Taubman Fellow of Senior Executives and Local Government at Harvard University's Kennedy School of Government.

== Career ==
Bollin had served on Brighton Township’s Planning Commission. In 2003, Bollin became a clerk for Brighton Township until 2018.

On November 6, 2018, Bollin was elected to the Michigan House of Representatives for District 42. Shortly afterwards, Bollin was named to serve on the Republican Party Policy Action Plan Committee.

On November 13, 2020, it was reported that Bollin had tested positive for COVID-19. On November 16, 2020, Bollin reiterated her opposition to a mandatory mask order in Michigan while at home recovering from the virus.

In 2022, after redistricting, Bollin was elected to represent the 49th state House district. She was reelected in 2024.

== Personal life ==
Bollin's husband is Tim. They have three sons. Bollin and her family live in Brighton Township, Michigan.
