= Jim Ananich =

American politician (born 1975)

Minority Leader of the Michigan Senate
- In office January 14, 2015 – January 1, 2023
- Preceded by: Gretchen Whitmer
- Succeeded by: Aric Nesbitt

Member of the Michigan Senate from the 27th district
- In office May 14, 2013 – January 1, 2023
- Preceded by: John J. Gleason
- Succeeded by: John Daniel Cherry

Member of the Michigan House of Representatives from the 49th district
- In office January 1, 2011 – May 13, 2013
- Preceded by: Lee Gonzales
- Succeeded by: Phil Phelps

President of the Flint City Council
- In office November 10, 2008 – November 9, 2009
- Preceded by: Carolyn Sims
- Succeeded by: Delrico Loyd

Member of the Flint City Council from the 7th ward
- In office November 8, 2005 – November 9, 2009
- Preceded by: Matt Schlinker
- Succeeded by: Dale Weighill

Personal details
- Born: September 20, 1975 (age 51) Flint, Michigan, U.S.
- Party: Democratic
- Spouse: Andrea Abdella
- Children: 1
- Education: Michigan State University (BA); University of Michigan, Flint (MPA)
- Website: Campaign website

James Ananich (/ˈænənɪk/ AN-ə-nik; born September 20, 1975) is an American politician from Michigan. A member of the Democratic Party, he represented the 27th district in the Michigan Senate from 2013 to 2023. He was the minority leader from 2015 to 2023.

== Early life ==
James "Jim" Ananich was born to James and Susan Ananich as their only child. They raised him in Flint. His father was Flint City Ombudsman. His mother died in 1986. The following year his father resigned as city ombudsman to teach policy science at University of Michigan-Flint. Ananich attended Flint Central High School where he played basketball and tennis.

Ananich graduated in 1998 from Michigan State University with a bachelor's degree in political science and economics and a secondary teaching certificate in social studies. He later received a master's degree in Public Administration-Educational Administration from the University of Michigan-Flint.

At Michigan State he joined the College Democrats. In 1998, he interned with the Michigan Democratic Party then went to work for Senate Minority Leader John D. Cherry Jr..

From 1998 to 2001, he worked for U.S. Rep. Dale Kildee, D-Flint. Until 2000, Ananich worked in Kildee's Washington, DC office. In 2000, his father died and he returned to Flint and worked out of Kildee's district office. After his 2004 primary loss, he worked for Bob Emerson.

Ananich met Andrea Abdella at the voting booth. Jim and Andrea were wed on November 8, 2003.

He then became a teacher in the Carman-Ainsworth and Flint Community School Districts from 2005 to 2009 teaching social studies. He was later employed by Priority Children as an education coordinator until 2011.

== Political career ==
Ananich served on the Flint City Council from November 8, 2005, to November 9, 2009. He ran against Lee Gonzales for Michigan's 49th House of Representatives district in the 2004 Democratic primary and lost. The next year, he was elected to Flint City Council and serve until 2009. On November 10, 2008, Ananich was selected by the council to be their president replacing Carolyn Sims. Ananich was succeeded as Council President by Delrico Loyd and as Member from the 7th ward by Dale Weighill. He then ran for Michigan's 49th House of Representatives district in 2010 winning against Allan Pool 67% to 33%, succeeding Gonzales.

Ananich was unopposed in the Democratic primary on August 7, 2012, in his run for reelection, which he won on November 6 with nearly 74 percent of the votes. He introduced a bill on February 5, 2013, to correct a law regarding the abuse of vulnerable adults changing how prosecuting attorneys prove their case and was signed into law on June 4, 2013.

In 2013, Ananich won the election on May 7, 2013, to fill the vacancy in the 27th district in the Michigan Senate caused by John J. Gleason's resignation. He introduced on October 23 a drive-by shooting incidents law that increased penalties which was passed and signed into law July 16, 2014. His scrap metal bill was signed into law on December 31. Ananich faced no opposition in the Democratic primary election on August 5, 2014. The Democratic State Senate caucus on November 6, 2014, selected Ananich to be the upcoming Senate Minority Leader.

== Policy positions ==
Shortly into his tenure as senator, the Flint water crisis enfolded over the course of several months and drew national attention to Flint. On January 13, 2016, Ananich called for the state to refund $2 million to the city; Ananich also requested further emergency funding from the state and a commitment to long-term funding to address the effects of the lead contamination. Ananich also criticized the role emergency managers played in the crisis and said that the law allowing the position of emergency manager should be reviewed and repealed. On January 20, 2016, Ananich introduced Senate Resolution 0133 (2016) that would grant state lawmakers probing the Flint water crisis subpoena power over the governor's office, which is immune to the state Freedom of Information Act.

On February 23, 2016, the Michigan state legislature started a committee to investigate the crisis. Ananich was named co-vice-chair along with Representative Ed McBroom.

Ananich is a supporter of bitcoin and stated that he wanted to make Michigan the most pro-bitcoin state in the country in 2022. He has said he is against lawmakers buying and trading stocks while in office.

== Elections ==
| District | Election Year | Votes | Opponent's Votes | Opponent |
|---|---|---|---|---|
| Michigan's 49th House of Representatives district | 2004; Primary | | | Lee Gonzales |
| Michigan's 49th House of Representatives district | 2010 | 16,771 | 7,881 | Allen Pool (R) |
| Michigan's 27th Senate district | 2013 | 8,728 | 2,640 | Robert Daunt |
| Michigan's 27th Senate district | 2014 | 51,296 | 15,057 | Brendt Gerics |

Michigan Senate
| Preceded by Gretchen Whitmer | Minority Leader of the Michigan Senate; 2015–2023 | Succeeded by Aric Nesbitt |
