= Mike Murphy (Michigan politician) =

American politician

Member-elect of the Michigan Senate from the 22nd district
- Assuming office January 2027
- Succeeding: Lana Theis

Personal details
- Party: Republican

Mike Murphy is an American politician. A member of the Republican Party, he is the member-elect for the 22nd district of the Michigan Senate.
