= Robert L. Emerson =

American politician (born 1948)

The Honorable Robert L. Emerson

Michigan Budget Director
- In office January 3, 2007 – December 31, 2010
- Preceded by: Mary A. Lannoye
- Succeeded by: John E. Nixon

Member of the Michigan Senate
- In office January 1, 1999 – December 31, 2006
- Preceded by: Joe Conroy
- Succeeded by: John J. Gleason
- Constituency: 29th district (1999-2002); 29th district (2003-2006)

Member of the Michigan House of Representatives
- In office November 4, 1980 – December 31, 1998
- Preceded by: Mark Clodfelter
- Succeeded by: Jack Minore
- Constituency: 81st district (1980-1992); 49th district (1993-1998)

Personal details
- Born: March 23, 1948 (age 78) Alpena, Michigan, U.S.
- Party: Democratic
- Education: University of Michigan

Robert L. Emerson (born March 23, 1948) is a Democratic politician from the U.S. state of Michigan.

He was member of the Michigan Senate having served as the Democratic minority leader. He represented the 27th district in Genesee County, which encompasses the city of Flint.

== Biography ==
Robert L. Emerson was born in Alpena, Michigan, on March 23, 1948. He graduated from St. Paul Catholic Seminary and attended Wayne State University and the University of Michigan. After moving to Flint in 1969, Emerson was employed by General Motors. He was elected to the Michigan State House of Representatives in 1980. After serving eighteen consecutive years in the State House, he served two four-year terms in the State Senate.

During this time he took on roles such as the Senate minority leader and Democratic floor leader. Additionally, he served as co-chairman of the School Aid Appropriations Subcommittee and chairman of the Public Health Appropriations Subcommittee. Emerson has been actively involved in issues regarding education, health, and labor legislation over the course of his career.

In January 2007, Emerson was appointed by Governor Jennifer Granholm as her next budget director.

On September 30, 2011, Michigan Governor Rick Snyder appointed an eight-member state review team for the City of Flint including Emerson. Senator Emerson is married to Judy Samelson (CEO of the Early Childhood Investment Corporation) and is the father of four children.
