= Charles Smiley =

American politician

Member of the Michigan House of Representatives from the 50th district
- In office 2011–2017
- Preceded by: Jim Slezak
- Succeeded by: Tim Sneller

Personal details
- Born: 1954 (age 71–72)

Charles Smiley is an American politician who served in the Michigan House of Representatives from 2010 to 2017.

== Career ==
For 18 years, Smiley worked at General Motors. From 1978, he worked for the City of Burton, Michigan as a firefighter.

Smiley ran for Burton City Council in 1987 and served until 1991, when he was elected Burton's Mayor, an office he held for 19 years. During his terms, the City votes approved three millages for the police department plus a renewal, and one for the fire department. He also established a volunteer Parks and Recreation Department. While he was publicly accused of bribery and extortion in connection with the federal trial of former public works director Charles Abbey, charges were never filed.

In 2010, he ran for 50th District Michigan State Representative as a Democrat. He ran against Genesee Township Trustee Richard Burrus, U.S. Marine James Cowan, former Richfield Township Supervisor Jeffrey Houston, and Richfield Trustee Gerald Masters in the primary. He won with 33% of the vote. In the November general election, Smiley defeated the Republican Ralph William 53 percent to 47 percent of the vote. The next day, he resigned as Mayor, effective December 31, 2010.

Election Results

Election Year	Votes	%	Opponent's votes	%	Opponent
2010	13,647	53	12,134	47	William Ralph (R)
