= Stanley M. Powell =

American politician

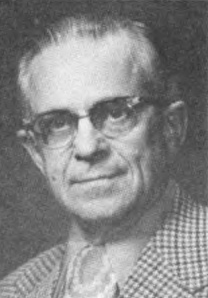

Member of the Michigan House of Representatives from the 88th district 89th District (1965-1972)
- In office January 1, 1965 – December 31, 1978
- Preceded by: District established
- Succeeded by: Alan L. Cropsey

Member of the Michigan House of Representatives from the Ionia County district
- In office January 1, 1931 – December 31, 1932
- Preceded by: Luther E. Hall
- Succeeded by: M. Clyde Stout

Personal details
- Born: Stanley Maurice Powell; July 7, 1898 Ionia, Michigan, US
- Died: August 25, 1988 (aged 90) Ionia County, Michigan, US
- Party: Republican
- Spouse: Eleanor
- Profession: Farmer

Military service
- Allegiance: United States of America
- Branch/service: United States Army
- Battles/wars: World War I

Stanley M. Powell (July 7, 1898 – August 25, 1988) was a Republican member of the Michigan House of Representatives and a delegate to the Michigan constitutional convention of 1962.

== Early life ==
Born on July 7, 1898, Powell was a lifelong farmer in Ionia County.

== Career ==
Powell served one term in the House (1931-1932) but was defeated for re-election in 1932. Three decades later, Powell was a delegate to the constitutional convention which drafted the Michigan Constitution. Shortly after the convention, Powell was again elected to the House and served 14 years.

Powell was a member of the Grange and the Farm Bureau as legislative counsel and public affairs director. He was president of the Michigan Good Roads Federation, a founder of the highway Users Conference, and president of the Michigan Good Roads Federation in 1957.

== Personal life ==
Powell was a member of the American Legion, Pi Kappa Delta, Delta Sigma Rho, and Alpha Zeta. Powell died on August 25, 1988, aged 90.
