= Paula Zelenko =

American politician (born 1957)

Member of the Michigan House of Representatives from the 50th district
- In office 2001–2006
- Preceded by: Deborah Cherry
- Succeeded by: Ted Hammon

Personal details
- Born: January 12, 1957 (age 69)
- Party: Democratic
- Spouse: William Zelenko
- Children: 6
- Education: Ross Medical Education Center; Parker Chiropractic School

Paula Zelenko (born January 12, 1957) is a Michigan politician who formerly served as Burton, Michigan's mayor and a member of the Michigan House of Representatives.

== Career ==
In 1991, Zelenko was elected to the Burton City Council, serving until 2001. In 1992, she unsuccessfully ran for the Michigan House of Representatives as a Republican. She was then elected as a Democrat to the Michigan House of Representatives, serving the 50th district until 2006. Zelenko returned to the Burton City Council in 2008 and served until December 2010. In 2010, she was an unsuccessful candidate for the 26th district of the Michigan Senate. In November 2010, Burton Mayor Charles Smiley was elected to the Michigan House of Representatives. The council had pre-selected Zelenko prior to Smiley's resignation date. In 2019, Zelenko announced she would not seek a third term as mayor. On November 18, 2019, Duane Haskins was sworn in as Zelenko's successor.
