= Michigan's 50th House of Representatives district =

American legislative district

Michigan's 50th State House of Representatives district
Representative
Jason Woolford; R–Howell
- Demographics: 93.5% White; 0.2% Black; 2.9% Hispanic; 0.6% Asian; 0.2% Native American; 0.1% Hawaiian/Pacific Islander; 0.2% Other; 2.2% Multiracial
- Population (2024): 94,540

Michigan's 50th House of Representatives district is a legislative district within the Michigan House of Representatives located in Livingston County. The district was created in 1965, when the Michigan Supreme Court ordered the reapportionment of state legislative districts from a county-based system to a proportional one following the Supreme Court case Reynolds v. Sims. It is currently represented by Republican Jason Woolford of Howell.

== List of representatives ==
Representative	Party	Years	Residence	Notes
Charles O. Conrad	Democratic	1965–1966	Jackson	
Hal Ziegler	Republican	1967–1972	Jackson	
Michael J. Griffin	Democratic	1973–1992	Jackson	
Thomas E. Scott	Democratic	1993–1994	Flint	
Deborah Cherry	Democratic	1995–2000	Burton	
Paula Zelenko	Democratic	2001–2006	Burton	
Ted Hammon	Democratic	2007–2008	Burton	
Jim Slezak	Democratic	2009–2010	Davison	
Charles Smiley	Democratic	2011–2016	Grand Blanc	Lived in Burton until around 2015.
Tim Sneller	Democratic	2017–2022	Burton	
Bob Bezotte	Republican	2023–2025	Howell	
Jason Woolford	Republican	2025–present	Howell	

== Historical district boundaries ==
Map	Description	Apportionment Plan	Notes
	Jackson County (part): Blackman Township; Jackson; Parma Township (part); Rives Township; Sandstone Township	1964 Apportionment Plan	
	Jackson County (part): Blackman Township; Jackson (part); Leoni Township; Napoleon Township; Summit Township (part)	1972 Apportionment Plan	
	Jackson County (part): Concord Township; Jackson; Parma Township; Pulaski Township; Spring Arbor Township; Springport Township; Summit Township	1982 Apportionment Plan	
	Genesee County (part): Burton; Genesee Township; Grand Blanc; Grand Blanc Township; Mount Morris	1992 Apportionment Plan	
	Genesee County (part): Burton; Davison; Davison Township; Genesee Township; Richfield Township	2001 Apportionment Plan	
	Genesee County (part): Burton; Grand Blanc; Grand Blanc Township; Mundy Township	2011 Apportionment Plan	
	Livingston County (part): Cohoctah Township; Conway Township; Deerfield Township; Handy Township; Hartland Township; Howell; Howell Township; Iosco Township; Marion Township; Oceola Township; Putnam Township (part); Tyrone Township (part); Unadilla Township	2021 Apportionment Plan (Note: Referred to as the Hickory plan.)	

== Recent elections ==
=== 2020s ===
2026 Michigan House of Representatives election
Party	Candidate	Votes	%
Republican	Jason Woolford (incumbent)	32,452	64.27
Democratic	Cassie Canedo	18,045	35.73
Total votes		50,497	100
Republican hold			

2024 Michigan House of Representatives election
Party	Candidate	Votes	%
Republican	Jason Woolford	40,119	67.64
Democratic	Austin Breuer	19,193	32.36
Total votes		59,312	100
Republican hold			

2022 Michigan House of Representatives election
Party	Candidate	Votes	%
Republican	Robert J. Bezotte	31,768	66.83
Democratic	Glen Miller	15,767	33.17
Total votes		47,535	100
Republican gain from Democratic			

2020 Michigan House of Representatives election
Party	Candidate	Votes	%
Democratic	Tim Sneller (incumbent)	27,860	54.24
Republican	Christina Fitchett-Hickson	23,507	45.76
Total votes		51,367	100
Democratic hold			

=== 2010s ===
2018 Michigan House of Representatives election
Party	Candidate	Votes	%
Democratic	Tim Sneller	22,057	57.2
Republican	Trace Fisher	16,515	42.8
Total votes		38,572	100
Democratic hold			

2016 Michigan House of Representatives election
Party	Candidate	Votes	%
Democratic	Tim Sneller	22,773	52.0
Republican	Michael Matheny	20,992	48.0
Total votes		43,765	100
Democratic hold			

2014 Michigan House of Representatives election
Party	Candidate	Votes	%
Democratic	Charles Smiley	17,018	58.7
Republican	Craig Withers	11,952	41.3
Total votes		28,970	100
Democratic hold			

2012 Michigan House of Representatives election
Party	Candidate	Votes	%
Democratic	Charles Smiley	26,678	60.9
Republican	Miles Gadola	17,165	39.2
Total votes		43,843	100
Democratic hold			

2010 Michigan House of Representatives election
Party	Candidate	Votes	%
Democratic	Charles Smiley	13,647	52.9
Republican	William Ralph	12,134	47.1
Total votes		25,781	100
Democratic hold			

2008 Michigan House of Representatives election
Party	Candidate	Votes	%
Democratic	Jim Slezak	29,792	72.5
Republican	Douglas O'Neal	11,290	27.5
Total votes		41,082	100
Democratic hold			
