= Alan Cropsey =

American politician (born 1952)

Alan L. Cropsey

Member of the Michigan Senate from the 33rd district
- In office January 1, 2003 – December 31, 2010
- Preceded by: Michael Goschka
- Succeeded by: Judy Emmons

Member of the Michigan House of Representatives from the 86th district
- In office January 1, 1993 – December 31, 1998
- Preceded by: Lew Dodak
- Succeeded by: Valde Garcia

Member of the Michigan Senate from the 30th district
- In office January 1, 1983 – December 31, 1986
- Preceded by: Richard J. Allen
- Succeeded by: Frederick P. Dillingham

Member of the Michigan House of Representatives from the 88th district
- In office January 1, 1979 – December 31, 1982
- Preceded by: Stanley M. Powell
- Succeeded by: Robert Bender

Personal details
- Born: Alan Lee Cropsey; June 13, 1952 (age 74) Paw Paw, Michigan, U.S.
- Party: Republican
- Spouse: Erika
- Education: Thomas M. Cooley Law School (JD); Bob Jones University (BS)

Alan Lee Cropsey (born June 13, 1952) is an American lawyer and politician who served as a member of both houses of the Michigan Legislature between 1979 and 2010. He is a member of the Republican Party.

== Early life and education ==
Cropsey was born in Paw Paw, Michigan, the son of Harmon G. Cropsey, who was a member of the state house of representatives from the 42nd district, 1981–1982; and of the state senate from the 21st district, 1983–1990.

Cropsey holds a B.S. in mathematics education from Bob Jones University and a J.D. from Thomas Cooley Law School.

== Political career ==
Cropsey served in the Michigan House of Representatives from 1979 to 1982 and from 1993 to 1998. He was vice chairman of the State Board of Canvassers from 1999 to 2001, and chairman in 2001. Cropsey was a member of the Michigan Senate from 1983 to 1986 and also from 2003 to 2010, serving as majority floor leader during his second term (2007 to 2010). In March 2007 Cropsey became co-chairman of the "Americans of Faith" coalition that supported the presidential candidacy of John McCain.

Cropsey has strongly opposed gay marriage and sexually explicit video games. He received a Defender of Freedom Award from the National Rifle Association in 1996 and a Legislator of the Year Award from the Michigan Conservative Union in 1983.

== Personal life ==
Cropsey married Erika Rumminger in 1979, and the couple has four children.
