= Bill Rogers (Michigan politician) =

American politician (1954-Nov 21 2026)

Member of the Michigan House of Representatives
- In office January 1, 2009 – December 31, 2014
- Preceded by: Chris Ward
- Succeeded by: Lana Theis
- Constituency: 66th district (2009–2012); 42nd district (2012–2014)

Personal details
- Born: July 4, 1954 (age 72) Lima, Ohio, U.S.
- Party: Republican
- Spouse: Debbie
- Relations: Mike Rogers (brother)
- Children: 3
- Education: Michigan State University
- Profession: Builder
- Website: State Rep. Bill Rogers

Bill Rogers (born July 4, 1954) is a politician from Michigan who served in that state's House of Representatives.

== Biography ==
A Republican from Brighton, Rogers was first elected in 2008; due to term limits, he was ineligible to seek re-election to the House in 2014. In 2016, he ran unopposed for Genoa Township Supervisor, a position he has held since. Rogers ran for re-election in 2024.

He is the older brother of former Congressman Mike Rogers.

== Electoral history ==
=== 2008 ===
66th District (Livingston (Brighton, Brighton Township, Genoa Township, Green Oak Township, Marion Township--part, Oceola Township), Oakland (Milford Township))
Party	Candidate	Votes	%
Republican	Bill Rogers	32,128	60.29
Democratic	Donna Anderson	19,145	35.92
Libertarian	Todd Richardson	2,020	3.79
Total votes		53,293	100.0
Republican hold			

=== 2010 ===
66th District (Livingston (Brighton, Brighton Township, Genoa Township, Green Oak Township, Marion Township--part, Oceola Township), Oakland (Milford Township))
Party	Candidate	Votes	%
Republican	Bill Rogers	26,990	73.94
Democratic	James Delcamp	9,512	26.06
Total votes		36,502	100.0
Republican hold			

=== 2012 ===
Because of redistricting following the 2010 United States census, Rogers was redistricted into and ran for the 42nd District.

42nd District (Livingston (Brighton, Brighton Township, Genoa Township, Green Oak Township, Hamburg Township, Putnam Township))
Party	Candidate	Votes	%
Republican	Bill Rogers	31,510	63.25
Democratic	Shanda Willis	16,476	33.07
Libertarian	James Lewis	1,830	3.67
Total votes		49,816	100.0
Republican hold			
