= Michigan's 49th House of Representatives district =

American legislative district

Michigan's 49th State House of Representatives district
Representative
Ann Bollin; R–Brighton Township
- Demographics: 81.5% White; 4.7% Black; 4% Hispanic; 5.5% Asian; 0.1% Native American; 0.6% Other; 3.6% Multiracial
- Population (2024): 95,071

Michigan's 49th House of Representatives district is a legislative district within the Michigan House of Representatives located in the counties of Livingston and Oakland. The district was created in 1965, when the Michigan Supreme Court ordered the reapportionment of state legislative districts from a county-based system to a proportional one following the Supreme Court case Reynolds v. Sims. It is currently represented by Republican Ann Bollin of Brighton Township.

== List of representatives ==
Representative	Party	Years	Residence	Notes
James Folks	Republican	1965–1972	Horton	
Dan Angel	Republican	1973–1978	Marshall	Resigned.
Everitt F. Lincoln	Republican	1978–1982	Albion	
Richard Fitzpatrick	Democratic	1983–1986	Battle Creek	
Bill Martin	Republican	1987–1992	Battle Creek	
Robert L. Emerson	Democratic	1993–1998	Flint	
Jack Minore	Democratic	1999–2004	Flint	
Lee Gonzales	Democratic	2005–2010	Flint Township	
Jim Ananich	Democratic	2011–2013	Flint	Resigned.
Phil Phelps	Democratic	2013–2018	Flushing	
John Daniel Cherry	Democratic	2019–2022	Flint	
Ann Bollin	Republican	2023–present	Brighton Township	

== Historical district boundaries ==
Map	Description	Apportionment Plan	Notes
	Calhoun County (part): Albion Township; Burlington Township; Clarendon Township; Eckford Township; Homer Township; Newton Township; Tekonsha Township; Jackson County (part): Columbia Township; Concord Township; Grass Lake Township; Hanover Township; Henrietta Township; Leoni Township; Liberty Township; Napoleon Township; Norvell Township; Parma Township (part); Pulaski Township; Spring Arbor Township; Summit Township; Waterloo Township; Lenawee County (part): Cambridge Township	1964 Apportionment Plan	
	Calhoun County (part): Excluding; Battle Creek; Battle Creek Township (part); Bedford Township; Convis Township; Emmett Township (part); Pennfield Township; Springfield; Jackson County (part): Concord Township; Hanover Township; Parma Township; Pulaski Township; Sandstone Township; Spring Arbor Township (part); Springport Township; Tompkins Township	1972 Apportionment Plan	
	Calhoun County (part): Albion; Albion Township; Athens Township; Battle Creek Township (part); Burlington Township; Clarence Township; Clarendon Township; Convis Township; Eckford Township; Emmett Township; Fredonia Township; Homer Township; Le Roy Township; Lee Township; Marengo Township; Marshall; Marshall Township; Newton Township; Pennfield Township; Tekonsha Township; Sheridan Township	1982 Apportionment Plan	
	Genesee County (part): Flint (part)	1992 Apportionment Plan	
	Genesee County (part): Clayton Township (part); Flint (part); Flint Township; Gaines Township; Swartz Creek	2001 Apportionment Plan	
	Genesee County (part): Flint (part); Flint Township; Flushing; Mount Morris; Mount Morris Township; Swartz Creek	2011 Apportionment Plan	
	Livingston County (part): Brighton; Brighton Charter Township; Green Oak Township; Oakland County (part): Commerce Township (part); Lyon Township (part); Novi (part); Walled Lake; Wixom	2021 Apportionment Plan (Note: Referred to as the Hickory plan.)	

== Recent elections ==
=== 2020s ===
2026 Michigan House of Representatives election
Party	Candidate	Votes	%
Republican	Ann M. Bollin (incumbent)	25,527	52.99
Democratic	Dan Pelchat	21,940	45.55
Libertarian	Trevor Step	702	1.46
Total votes		48,169	100
Republican hold			

2024 Michigan House of Representatives election
Party	Candidate	Votes	%
Republican	Ann M. Bollin (incumbent)	32,464	58.86
Democratic	Andy Wood	22,695	41.14
Total votes		55,159	100
Republican hold			

2022 Michigan House of Representatives election
Party	Candidate	Votes	%
Republican	Ann M. Bollin	25,118	55.78
Democratic	Christina M. Kafkakis	19,910	44.22
Total votes		45,028	100
Republican gain from Democratic			

2020 Michigan House of Representatives election
Party	Candidate	Votes	%
Democratic	John D. Cherry (incumbent)	28,122	68.87
Republican	Bryan Lutz	12,711	31.13
Total votes		40,833	100
Democratic hold			

=== 2010s ===
2018 Michigan House of Representatives election
Party	Candidate	Votes	%
Democratic	John D. Cherry	22,769	72.4
Republican	Patrick Duvendeck	8,695	27.6
Total votes		31,464	100
Democratic hold			

2016 Michigan House of Representatives election
Party	Candidate	Votes	%
Democratic	Phil Phelps	24,862	68.5
Republican	Jeremy Baker	11,458	31.6
Total votes		36,320	100
Democratic hold			

2014 Michigan House of Representatives election
Party	Candidate	Votes	%
Democratic	Phil Phelps	18,211	73.6
Republican	Lu Penton	6,522	26.4
Total votes		24,733	100
Democratic hold			

2013 Michigan House of Representatives special election
Party	Candidate	Votes	%
Democratic	Phil Phelps	4,894	63.4
Republican	Don Pfeiffer	2,501	32.4
Libertarian	Pat Clawson	323	4.2
Total votes		7,718	100
Democratic hold			

2012 Michigan House of Representatives election
Party	Candidate	Votes	%
Democratic	Jim Ananich	28,275	74.5
Republican	Robert Daunt	9,674	25.5
Total votes		37,949	100
Democratic hold			

2010 Michigan House of Representatives election
Party	Candidate	Votes	%
Democratic	Jim Ananich	15,647	67.3
Republican	Allen Pool	7,610	32.7
Total votes		23,257	100
Democratic hold			

2008 Michigan House of Representatives election
Party	Candidate	Votes	%
Democratic	Lee Gonzales	32,653	100
Total votes		32,653	100
Democratic hold			
