= Richard Hammel =

American politician

Richard E. Hammel

Member of the Michigan House of Representatives from the 48th district
- In office January 1, 2007 – December 31, 2012
- Preceded by: John J. Gleason
- Succeeded by: Pam Faris

Personal details
- Born: 1958 (age 67–68)
- Party: Democratic
- Education: University of Michigan–Flint

Richard E. Hammel, a Democratic Party politician, was a member of the Michigan House of Representatives from the 48th District.

== Life ==
Hammel obtained a bachelor's degree from the University of Michigan-Flint.

=== Political career ===
Hammel served on the Genesee County, Michigan Board of Commissioners and served as its chair before being elected to the Michigan State House of Representatives in 2006. Hammel defeated Ralph C. Burger for the 48th District Michigan State Representative seat in 2008 then repeated in 2010 by defeating Susan Culver in 2010. Democratic Representatives selected him as minority leader for the legislative session beating out fellow Genesee County representative Woodrow Stanley.

Michigan House of Representative Elections

| Election Year | Votes | Opponent's votes | Opponent |
|---|---|---|---|
| 2008 | 28,245 | 13,698 | Ralph C. Burger, (R) |
| 2010 | 15,322 | 11,401 | Susan Culver (R) |
