= Harmon G. Cropsey =

American politician (1917–2009)

Harmon G. Cropsey (August 16, 1917 – March 13, 2009) was an American politician and farmer.

Born in Volinia Township, Michigan, Cass County, Michigan, Cropsey served in the United States Navy during World War II. He went to Michigan State University and received his bachelor's degree from Iowa State University. He farmed in Iowa and Michigan and was the manager of the Iowa Canning Company in Vinton, Iowa. He served on the Geneva Public School Board and the Lewis Cass Intermediate School Board in Michigan. From 1981 to 1983, Cropsey served in the Michigan House of Representatives, as a Republican, and then served in the Michigan State Senate from 1983 to 1990. His son Alan Cropsey also served in the Michigan Legislature. He died in at his home in DeWitt, Michigan.
