= John J. Gleason =

American politician

Clerk/Register of Deeds of Genesee County
- In office January 2, 2013 – October 25, 2022
- Preceded by: Michael J. Carr (as clerk); Rose Bogardus (as register of deeds)
- Succeeded by: Domonique D. Clemons

Member of the Michigan Senate from the 27th district
- In office January 1, 2007 – January 2, 2013
- Preceded by: Robert L. Emerson
- Succeeded by: Jim Ananich

Member of the Michigan House of Representatives from the 48th district
- In office January 1, 2003 – December 31, 2006
- Preceded by: Vera B. Rison
- Succeeded by: Richard Hammel

Member of the Genesee County Board of Commissioners
- In office 1995–2002

Personal details
- Born: August 26, 1954 (age 71) Flushing, Michigan
- Party: Democratic
- Spouse: Karen
- Occupation: Millwright

John J. Gleason (born August 26, 1954) is a Democratic politician and former Clerk/Register of Deeds for Genesee County, Michigan.

== Life ==
=== Political ===
Gleason was elected to the Genesee County Board of Commissioners in 1994. He moved on to be elected to the state House of Representatives 48 District in 2002 continuing as Representative until he was elected to Michigan Senate in 2006. He was reelected State Senator in 2010 to his final available term under state term limits. Considering a run for the soon to be vacated U.S. Representative office by Dale Kildee, Gleason instead filed to run for the newly combined office of Genesee County Clerk/Register of Deeds. Both current officeholders, Clerk Michael J. Carr and(Register of Deeds Rose Bogardus, of the soon to be merged positions filed to run for new office. Bogardus withdrew assuming Carr would continue his campaign while Carr also withdrew to retire leaving Gleason the sole Democratic candidate for Clerk/Register. Gleason defeat Republican Michael Stikovich in the Clerk/Register general election 119,838 to 52,996. Local news outlets reported on April 8, 2022, Gleason was arrested on several charges. The charges are bribing or intimidating a witness and willful neglect of duty. On October 25, 2022, he pleaded guilty and resigned from office.

Political offices
Preceded by merged (Clerk: Michael J. Carr; ROD: Rose Bogardus)	Clerk/Register of Deeds of Genesee County, Michigan; 2013-2022	Succeeded by TBA
