= Deborah Cherry =

American politician (born 1954)

Member of the Michigan Senate from the 26th district
- In office January 1, 2003 – December 31, 2010
- Preceded by: Valde Garcia
- Succeeded by: David B. Robertson

Member of the Michigan House of Representatives from the 50th district
- In office 1995–2000
- Preceded by: Thomas E. Scott
- Succeeded by: Paula Zelenko

Personal details
- Born: August 19, 1954 (age 72) Dowagiac, Michigan
- Party: Democratic
- Education: Oakland University; University of Michigan–Flint

Deb Cherry (born August 19, 1954) is a former Democratic member of the Michigan Senate, representing the 26th district until she was elected Genesee County treasurer in 2010. Her district included parts of Genesee and Oakland counties. Previously she was a member of the Michigan House of Representatives from 1995 to 2000. Her brother John D. Cherry was the Lieutenant Governor of Michigan, and her nephew John Cherry III has been in the Michigan Legislature since 2019.

== Background ==
Cherry received a Bachelor of Science degree from Oakland University and earned a Master of Public Administration from University of Michigan-Flint.

== Political career ==
Cherry's interest in politics began in high school when she joined a non-partisan student group. Before being elected into the legislature, Cherry worked with the Valley Area Agency on Aging where she managed grants and worked to find funding for various agency services. She also served on the Genesee County Commission for six years, where she represented the 3rd District, and was Commission Chair for 3 years. As of 2007, Cherry was Chairwoman of the Greater Flint Health Coalition, a member of the Michigan Fitness foundation, the Michigan Prospect and IMA Board, as well as is an honorary member of the Genesee County Board.

There was speculation that she might run for Congress in 2012.
