= Brighton Township, Michigan =

- Charter township
- Charter Township of Brighton
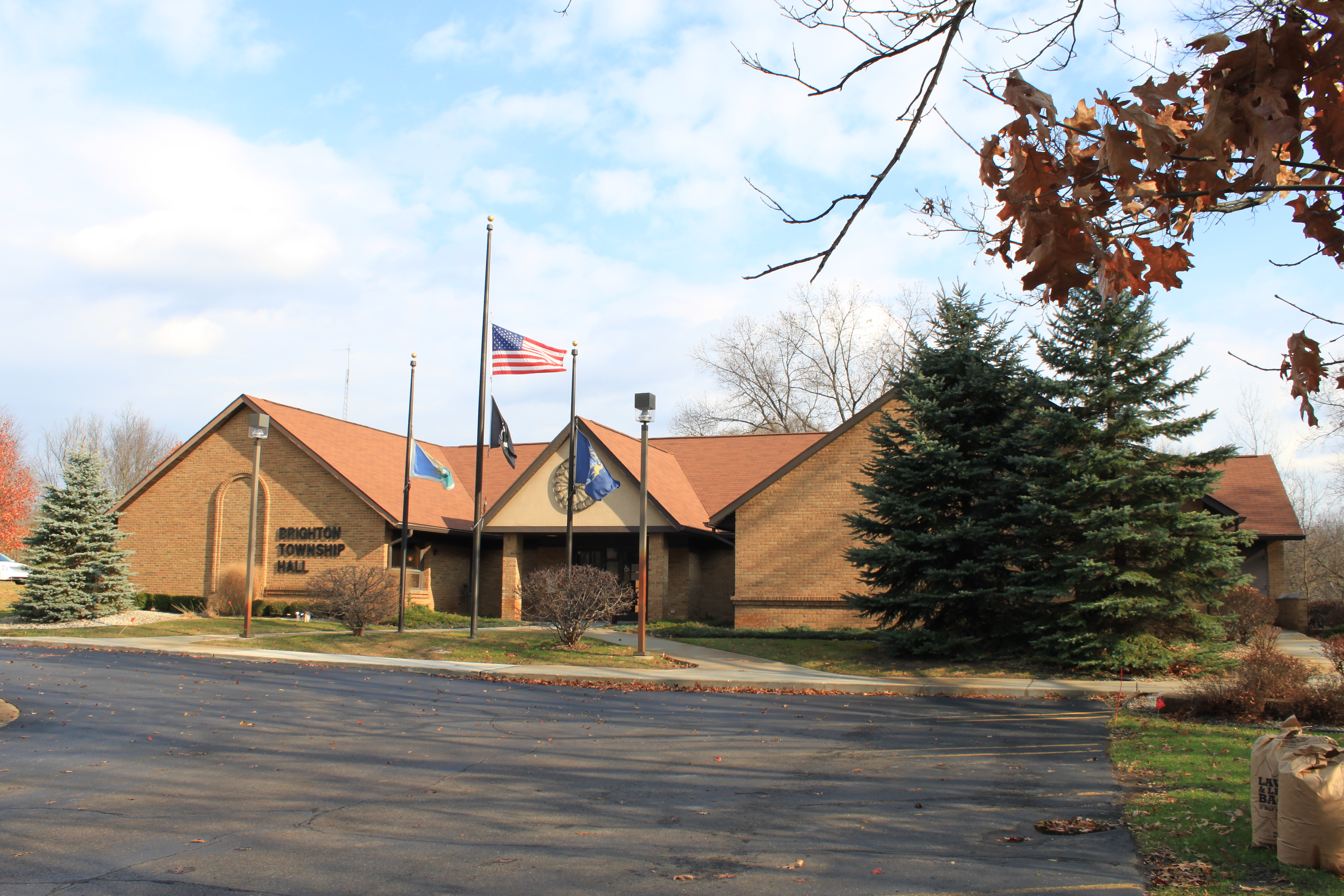
- Brighton Township Hall on Buno Road

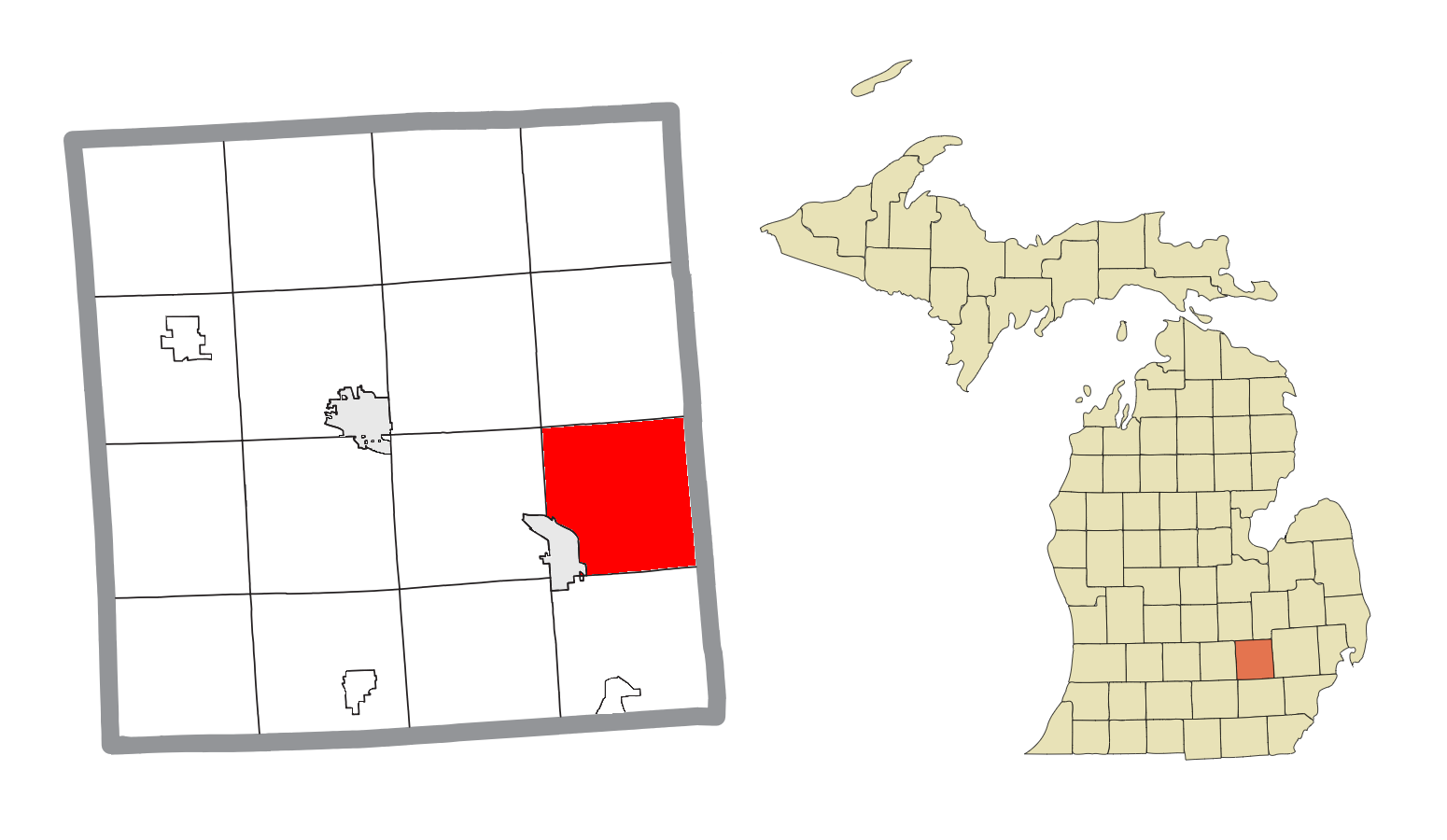
- Location within Livingston County

- Location in Michigan Location in the United States
- Coordinates: 42°33′50″N 83°44′11″W
- Country: United States
- State: Michigan
- County: Livingston
- Established: 1838

Government
  - Supervisor: Patrick Michel
  - Clerk: Joseph Riker

Area
  - Total: 34.6 sq mi (89.6 km^{2})
  - Land: 33.0 sq mi (85.4 km^{2})
  - Water: 1.6 sq mi (4.2 km^{2})
- Elevation: 945 ft (288 m)

Population (2020)
  - Total: 19,144
  - Density: 581/sq mi (224.2/km^{2})
- Time zone: UTC-5 (Eastern (EST))
  - Summer (DST): UTC-4 (EDT)
- ZIP Codes: 48114, 48116 (Brighton); 48380 (Milford)
- Area code: 810
- FIPS code: 26-10640
- GNIS feature ID: 1625982
- Website: www.brightontwp.com

Brighton Charter Township is a charter township of Livingston County in the U.S. state of Michigan. As of the 2020 census, the township population was 19,144. The township is bordered on the southwest by the city of Brighton, but the two are administered autonomously.

== Communities ==
- The city of Brighton is located adjacent to the township, but is administratively autonomous.
- Pleasant Valley was a rural post office in the southeast of the township. Elijah Marsh was the first postmaster of the office, which operated from July 24, 1837, until July 29, 1852. Marsh was succeeded by Peter Delamater and then by Melzer Bird.

== Geography ==
The township is in the southeastern part of Livingston County and is bordered to the east by Oakland County. The Interstate 96 and U.S. Route 23 cross in the southwest part of the township. I-96 serves the township via exits 147, 150, and 151, while US 23 has access within the township only via I-96. I-96 leads east 43 miles (69 km) to Detroit and west 47 miles (76 km) to Lansing, while US 23 leads north 36 miles (58 km) to Flint and south 17 miles (27 km) to Ann Arbor.

According to the United States Census Bureau, Brighton Township has a total area of 34.6 square miles (89.6 km²), of which 33.0 square miles (85.4 km²) is land and 1.6 square miles (4.2 km²), or 4.69%, is water. Streams in the township flow west and southwest and are part of the Huron River watershed leading to Lake Erie.

General Motors' Milford Proving Ground is in the northeast part of the township.

== Demographics ==
As of the census of 2000, there were 17,673 people, 5,950 households, and 5,015 families residing in the township. The population density was 533.7 inhabitants per square mile (206.1/km^{2}). There were 6,177 housing units at an average density of 186.5 per square mile (72.0/km^{2}). The racial makeup of the township was 97.29% White, 0.43% African American, 0.29% Native American, 0.83% Asian, 0.04% Pacific Islander, 0.31% from other races, and 0.81% from two or more races. Hispanic or Latino of any race were 1.22% of the population. More than 70% of the residents claim Polish, Irish, English or German ancestry. Another 15% claim Portuguese ancestry.

There were 5,950 households, out of which 42.9% had children under the age of 18 living with them, 76.0% were married couples living together, 5.4% had a female householder with no husband present, and 15.7% were non-families. 12.7% of all households were made up of individuals, and 3.7% had someone living alone who was 65 years of age or older. The average household size was 2.96 and the average family size was 3.25. The median Brighton Township home was worth $255,100 and over 66% of the homes are assessed between $200,000 to $500,000. About 17.6% of the population have no mortgage nor rent payment and 60% of local residents spend less than 25% of household income on housing and housing-related expenses.

In the township, the population distribution was spaced with 30.0% under the age of 18, 6.0% from 18 to 24, 29.6% from 25 to 44, 27.7% from 45 to 64, and 6.7% who were 65 years of age or older with the median age at 38 years. For every 100 females age 18 and over, there were 103.2 males.

The median income for a household in the township for 2010 was $93,327, and the median income for a family was $99,680. Males had a median income of $64,775 versus $33,328 for females. The per capita income for the township was $38,151. About 1.8% of families and 2.5% of the population were below the poverty line, including 2.9% of those under age 18 and 2.8% of those age 65 or over.

== Education ==
Most students in Brighton Township attend the Brighton Area Schools and Hartland Consolidated Schools. Also, due to the high numbers of Catholics in Brighton Township, many students attend St. Patrick's Catholic school. "St. Pat's" is a traditional Catholic school that maintains religious elements in the curriculum. There is also Shepherd of the Lakes Lutheran School and Cornerstone Christian School which are Christian schools. The Brighton area also has Charyl Stockwell Academy, CSA (primary) and Charyl Stockwell Preparatory Academy, CSPA (middle and high school) organized under the multischool Stockwell District run by Dr. Chuck Stockwell.
