= Senator Kahn =

Senator Kahn may refer to:

- Jay Kahn (born 1950), New Hampshire State Senate
- Roger Kahn (politician) (born 1945), Michigan State Senate
