= W. Frank James =

American politician (1873–1945)

William Francis James
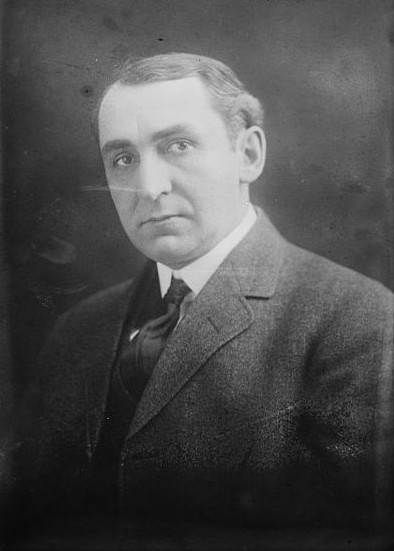

Member of the U.S. House of Representatives from Michigan's 12th district
- In office March 4, 1915 – January 3, 1935
- Preceded by: William J. MacDonald
- Succeeded by: Frank Hook

Member of the Michigan Senate from the 32nd district
- In office 1911–1914
- Preceded by: Charles Smith
- Succeeded by: George Williams

Personal details
- Born: May 23, 1873 Morristown, New Jersey
- Died: November 17, 1945 (aged 72) Arlington, Virginia
- Party: Republican
- Education: Albion College
- Occupation: Soldier

William Francis James (May 23, 1873 – November 17, 1945) was a soldier and congressman from the U.S. state of Michigan.

== Biography ==
James was born in Morristown, New Jersey, and moved with his parents to Hancock, Michigan, in 1876, where he attended the public schools. He attended Albion College in Albion, Michigan, in 1890 and 1891.

James was treasurer of Houghton County, Michigan, 1900–1904, and engaged in the real estate and insurance business. He served as a private in Company F of the Thirty-fourth Regiment, Michigan Volunteer Infantry, during the Spanish–American War. He was a member of the board of aldermen of Hancock, 1906–1908, and was mayor of Hancock in 1908 and 1909. He was member of the Michigan Senate, representing the 32nd district from 1911 to 1914.

In 1914, James defeated incumbent Democrat William J. MacDonald to be elected as a Republican from Michigan's 12th congressional district to the 64th United States Congress. He was subsequently re-elected to the nine succeeding Congresses, serving from March 4, 1915, to January 3, 1935. He was chairman of the Committee on Military Affairs in the 71st Congress. He was an unsuccessful candidate for reelection in 1934 and 1936, losing both times to Democrat Frank E. Hook in the general election.

James died in Arlington, Virginia, and was interred in Arlington National Cemetery.

U.S. House of Representatives
| Preceded by William J. MacDonald | United States Representative for the 12th congressional district of Michigan; 1915–1935 | Succeeded by Frank Hook |
