= Michigan's 32nd Senate district =

American legislative district

Michigan's 32nd State Senate district
Senator
Jon Bumstead; R–Norton Shores
- Demographics: 78.7% White; 8.6% Black; 6.6% Hispanic; 0.5% Asian; 0.5% Native American; 0.2% Other; 4.8% Multiracial
- Population (2024): 262,588

Michigan's 32nd Senate district is one of 38 districts in the Michigan Senate. The 32nd district was created by the 1850 Michigan Constitution, as the 1835 constitution only permitted a maximum of eight senate districts. It has been represented by Republican Jon Bumstead since 2023, succeeding fellow Republican Kenneth Horn.

== Geography ==
District 32 encompasses all of Benzie, Mason, and Oceana counties, as well as parts of Muskegon and Manistee counties.

=== 2011 Apportionment Plan ===
District 32, as dictated by the 2011 Apportionment Plan, was based in Saginaw, covering all of Saginaw County and parts of western Genesee County. Other communities in the district include Bridgeport, Buena Vista, Freeland, Shields, Frankenmuth, Flushing, Linden, Saginaw Township, Fenton Township, and Flushing Township.

The district overlapped with Michigan's 4th and 5th congressional districts, and with the 48th, 49th, 51st, 85th, 94th, and 95th districts of the Michigan House of Representatives.

== List of senators ==
Senator	Party	Dates	Residence	Notes
Luther W. Clarke	Democratic	1853-1854	Eagle River	
A. I. Upson	Democratic	1855-1856	Eagle Harbor	
Robert J. Graveraet	Democratic	1857-1858	Marquette	
William Edmund Dickinson	Republican	1859-1860	Clifton	
Joseph Coulter	Democratic	1861-1862	Ontonagon	
Elijah S. Northrop	Democratic	1863	Hancock	Died in office.
John H. Forster	Democratic	1865-1866	Houghton	
Thomas J. Brown	Democratic	1867-1868	Houghton	
William Willard Jr.	Democratic	1869-1870	Ontonagon	
Frank G. White	Republican	1871-1872	Calumet	
Edwin B. Isham	Republican	1873-1874	Negaunee	
Peter White	Democratic	1875-1876	Marquette	
Reuben H. Osburn	Republican	1877-1878	Calumet	
Seth D. North	Republican	1879-1880	Hancock	
Joseph H. Chandler	Republican	1881-1882	Hancock	
James Mercer	Republican	1883-1884	Ontonagon	
Jay Abel Hubbell	Republican	1885-1888	Houghton	
Thomas B. Dunstan	Republican	1889-1890	Hancock	
John H. D. Stevens	Republican	1891-1892	Ironwood	
Willis F. Sawyer	Republican	1893-1894	Ontonagon	
Carlos D. Shelden	Republican	1895-1896	Houghton	
Orrin W. Robinson	Republican	1897-1898	Chassell	
Charles Smith	Republican	1899-1910	Houghton County	
W. Frank James	Republican	1911-1914	Hancock	
George Williams	Republican	1915-1916	Calumet	
James M. Wilcox	Republican	1917-1928	Calumet	
Adolph F. Heidkamp	Republican	1929-1936	Lake Linden	
Henry F. Shea	Democratic	1937-1940	Laurium	
William C. Birk	Republican	1941-1942	Baraga	
Fred W. Burritt	Republican	1943-1948	Houghton	Died in office.
Leo H. Roy	Republican	1949-1958	Hancock	
Charles O. McManiman	Democratic	1959-1964	Houghton	
Milton Zaagman	Republican	1965-1974	Grand Rapids	
John R. Otterbacher	Democratic	1975-1978	Grand Rapids	
Stephen V. Monsma	Democratic	1979-1982	Grand Rapids	
Paul B. Henry	Republican	1983-1984	Grand Rapids	Resigned after elected to U.S. House of Representatives.
Vern Ehlers	Republican	1985-1993	Grand Rapids	Resigned after elected to U.S. House of Representatives.
Glenn Steil Sr.	Republican	1994	Grand Rapids	
Leon Stille	Republican	1995–2002	Crockery Township	Lived in Ferrysburg from around 1995 to 2000.
Michael Goschka	Republican	2003–2006	Brant	
Roger Kahn	Republican	2007–2014	Saginaw	
Kenneth Horn	Republican	2015–2022	Frankenmuth	
Jon Bumstead	Republican	2023–present	Norton Shores	Lived in North Muskegon until around 2023.

== Recent election results ==
=== 2020s ===
2026 Michigan Senate election
Primary election
Party	Candidate	Votes	%
Republican	Kim Cole	20,496	76.05
Republican	Max Riekse	6,453	23.95
Total votes		26,949	100
Democratic	Rebecca Amidon	32,271	100
Total votes		32,271	100
General election
Democratic	Rebecca Amidon	62,104	50.59
Republican	Kim Cole	60,646	49.41
Total votes		122,750	100
Democratic gain from Republican			

2022 Michigan Senate election, District 32
Primary election
Party	Candidate	Votes	%
Republican	Jon Bumstead (Incumbent)	24,964	76.1
Republican	Charles Ritchard	7,838	23.9
Total votes		32,802	100
General election
Republican	Jon Bumstead (incumbent)	61,113	52.8
Democratic	Terry J. Sabo	54,557	47.2
Total votes		115,670	100
Republican hold			

=== 2018 ===
2018 Michigan Senate election, District 32
Primary election
Party	Candidate	Votes	%
Democratic	Phil Phelps	14,152	58.7
Democratic	Henry Gaudreau	9,938	41.3
Total votes		24,090	100
General election
Republican	Ken Horn (incumbent)	62,375	55.5
Democratic	Phil Phelps	50,058	44.5
Total votes		112,433	100
Republican hold			

=== 2014 ===
2014 Michigan Senate election, District 32
Primary election
Party	Candidate	Votes	%
Democratic	Stacy Erwin Oakes	11,257	61.8
Democratic	Garnet Lewis	6,959	38.2
Total votes		18,216	100
General election
Republican	Ken Horn	49,452	54.3
Democratic	Stacy Erwin Oakes	41,539	45.7
Total votes		90,911	100
Republican hold			

=== Federal and statewide results ===
Year	Office	Results
2020	President	Trump 51.6 – 46.9%
2018	Senate	Stabenow 49.2 – 48.9%
2018	Governor	Whitmer 51.0 – 46.4%
2016	President	Trump 50.7 – 44.5%
2014	Senate	Peters 57.8 – 38.6%
2014	Governor	Schauer 50.9 – 46.8%
2012	President	Obama 53.6 – 45.5%
2012	Senate	Stabenow 60.4 – 36.8%

== Historical district boundaries ==
Map	Description	Apportionment Plan	Notes
	Kent County (part); Alpine Township; Grand Rapids (part); Grandville; Walker	1964 Apportionment Plan	
	Kent County (part); Alpine Township; Grand Rapids (part); Plainfield Township; Walker; Wyoming	1972 Apportionment Plan	
	Kent County (part); Ada Township; Cannon Township; Courtland Township (part); East Grand Rapids; Grand Rapids; Grand Rapids Township; Grattan Township; Oakfield Township; Vergennes Township	1982 Apportionment Plan	
	Muskegon County; Ottawa County (part); Allendale Township; Blendon Township; Chester Township; Coopersville; Crockery Township; Ferrysburg; Grand Haven; Grand Haven Township; Olive Township; Park Township; Polkton Township; Port Sheldon Township; Robinson Township; Spring Lake Township; Tallmadge Township; Wright Township	1992 Apportionment Plan	
	Gratiot County; Saginaw County	2001 Apportionment Plan	
	Genesee County (part); Argentine Township; Clayton Township; Fenton Township; Flushing; Flushing Township; Gaines Township; Linden; Montrose; Montrose Township; Saginaw County	2011 Apportionment Plan	
