= Michael Goschka =

American politician

Michael J. Goschka

Member of the Michigan Senate from the 32nd district 33rd district (1999-2002)
- In office January 1, 1999 – December 31, 2006
- Preceded by: Jon Cisky
- Succeeded by: Roger Kahn

Member of the Michigan House of Representatives from the 94th district
- In office January 1, 1993 – December 31, 1998
- Preceded by: Ken Sikkema
- Succeeded by: Jim Howell

Personal details
- Born: October 21, 1953 (age 72) Saginaw, Michigan
- Party: Republican
- Spouse: Maryann

Michael Goschka (born October 21, 1953) is a Republican politician from the U.S. state of Michigan. He was a member of the Michigan State House of Representatives from 1993 through 1998. He was then elected to the Michigan State Senate and served as Senator from 1999 through 2006. In high school Mike was a top long distance runner, at Chesaning High, setting a school record in the two-mile with a 9:57.1. He also competed on the varsity cross country team his junior and senior years. He ran two years on the varsity team at Delta College.

Goschka achieved a political upset by defeating then-Speaker of the House, Lew Dodak (D-Taymouth Twp.), by 142 votes (50.18% of the vote), in 1992. He then won two subsequent elections in the same geographical district with 66.1% of the vote in 1994, and 66.6% in 1996.

Being elected to the Michigan State Senate in 1998 in a heavily Democrat district, and winning reelection in 2002, it was in his second term that Goschka established himself as a strong proponent of Higher Education. As Chairman of the Senate Appropriations Subcommittee on Higher Education, Goschka worked at reducing the funding gap between the lower-funded-per-student schools vs. the higher-funded-per-student schools. He successfully convinced his colleagues that a basic minimum funding floor should exist for every college student in the State of Michigan's public universities, regardless of which school they attended.

Goschka was also recognized as a "Friend of Agriculture," as designated by Michigan Farm Bureau, and received their "Silver Plow" Award. As the author of 34 laws in the State of Michigan, Goschka was the primary sponsor of two major agricultural bills that are now law, providing a $5 million interest-free loan to a large sugar beet cooperative that was formed by growers, and ending the "pop-up tax" on agricultural land that remained in agricultural use.

Goschka also was the recipient of the "Guardian of Small Business" by the National Federation of Independent Businesses (NFIB), as well as the top honor given out the Michigan Chamber of Commerce. Additionally, he was honored by Saginaw Valley State University in May 2006 with an Honorary Doctor of Laws degree.

Goschka is currently employed as the Legislative Director for state representative William Bruck.
