= Carlos D. Shelden =

American politician

Carlos D. Sheldon
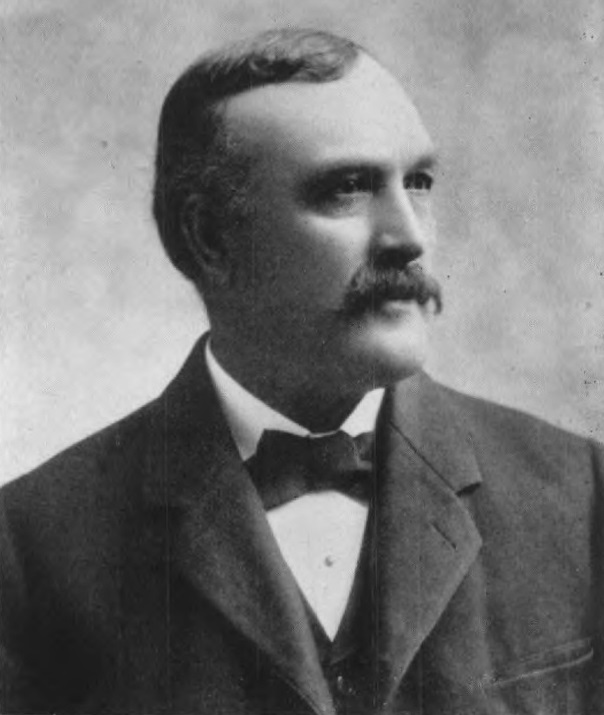
- From 1900's Men of Progress: Embracing Biographical Sketches of Representative Michigan Men

Member of the U.S. House of Representatives from Michigan's 12th district
- In office March 4, 1897 – March 3, 1903
- Preceded by: Samuel M. Stephenson
- Succeeded by: H. Olin Young

Personal details
- Born: June 10, 1840 Walworth, Wisconsin, U.S.
- Died: June 24, 1904 (aged 64) Houghton, Michigan, U.S.
- Party: Republican

Carlos Douglas Shelden (June 10, 1840 – June 24, 1904) was a soldier and politician from the U.S. state of Michigan.

Shelden was born in Walworth, Wisconsin and moved with his parents to Houghton County, Michigan in 1847. He attended the Union School of Ypsilanti, Michigan and returned to his home in the fall of 1861. He served throughout the Civil War as captain in the Twenty-third Regiment, Michigan Volunteer Infantry. At the end of his service, Shelden returned to Houghton County and engaged in mining, machining, real estate, and the steamboat business. Years later, he served in the Michigan House of Representatives from Houghton County 2nd District, 1893–94 and served in the Michigan Senate (32nd District) in 1894.

In 1896, Shelden was elected as a Republican from Michigan's 12th congressional district to the 55th United States Congress. He was subsequently re-elected to the 56th and 57th Congresses, serving from March 4, 1897 to March 3, 1903 in the U.S. House. He was an unsuccessful candidate for re-nomination in 1902, losing to fellow Republican H. Olin Young.

Carlos D. Shelden died just two weeks after his 64th birthday in Houghton, Michigan and is interred in Forest Hill Cemetery.

U.S. House of Representatives
Preceded by Samuel M. Stephenson	United States Representative for the 12th congressional district of Michigan; 1897 – 1903	Succeeded by H. Olin Young
