= J. Vivian Jr. and Company Building =

- U.S. National Register of Historic Places
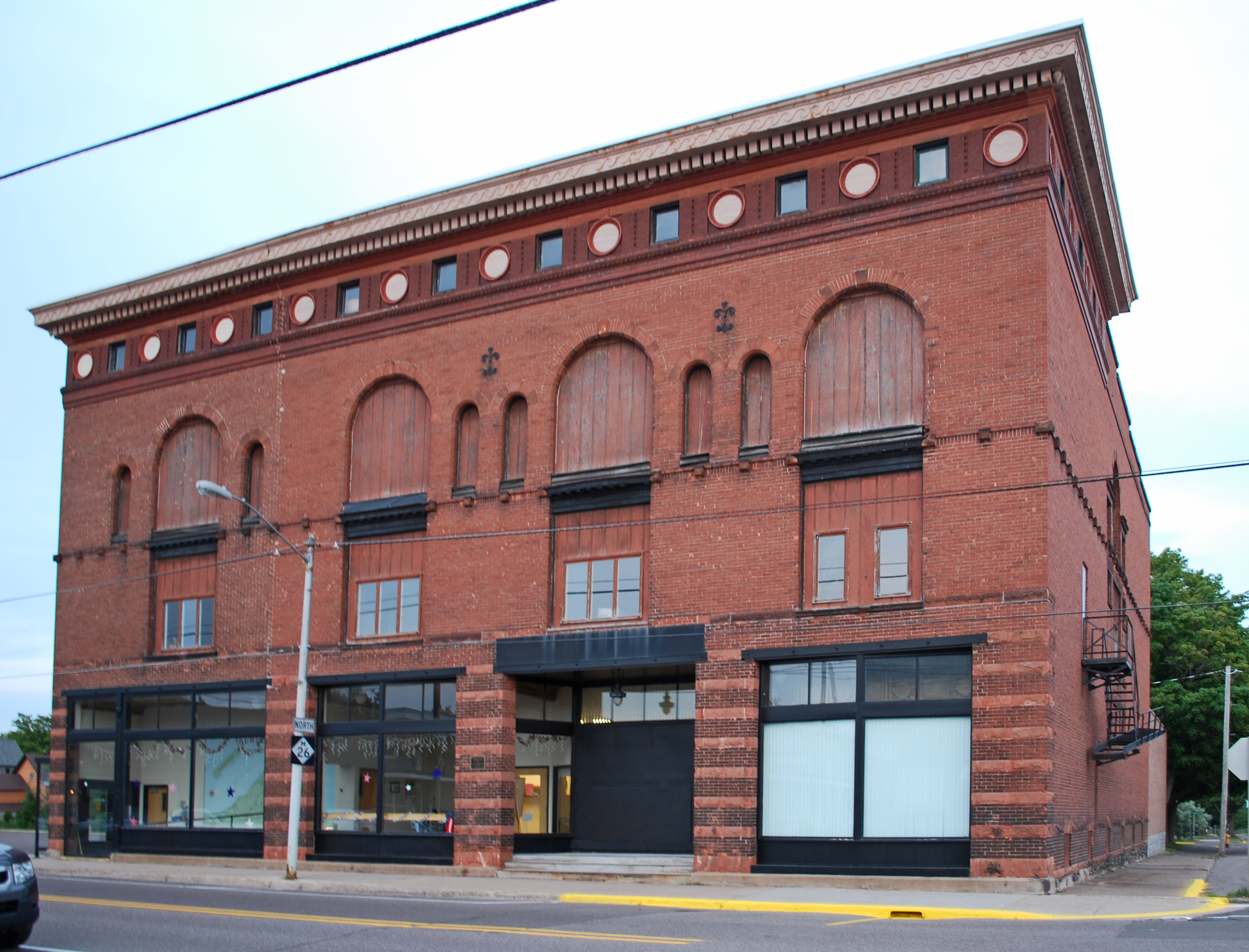
- Interactive map
- Location: 342 Hecla St., Laurium, Michigan
- Coordinates: 47°14′10″N 88°26′37″W
- Built: 1894
- Architect: Demetrius Frederick Charlton
- Architectural style: Italian Renaissance Revival, and Italianate
- NRHP reference No.: 03000625
- Added to NRHP: July 10, 2003

The J. Vivian Jr. and Company Building is a commercial building located at 342 Hecla Street in Laurium, Michigan. Constructed in the Italian Renaissance Revival and Italianate architectural styles, it was listed on the National Register of Historic Places in 2003.

== History ==
Captain Johnson Vivian Sr. was born in Cornwall, England. He worked in the mining industry in his home country, then emigrated to Michigan's Keweenaw Peninsula to work as a mining captain, first in Eagle Harbor, then moving to mines located in Copper Harbor, Phoenix, Hancock, and Ontonogan, among other places.

Captain Vivian had four sons, one of whom was Johnson Vivian Jr. The younger Vivian was born in the United States and attended high school in the area. Captain Vivian had a number of commercial interests, and in 1886, the younger Vivian, with assistance from his father, established J. Vivian Jr. and Company, a mercantile business, in Osceola.

In 1894 the father and son established a branch of their mercantile business in Laurium, constructing a building on Hecla Street. At the time, the firm was taking a risk as the store's location was viewed as remote. However, the store was an immediate success, and by 1895 employed 50 people. Other merchants followed Vivian's example, and the block on Hecla soon became the commercial center of the area. In 1903, the store was the largest in the area.

Johnson Vivian Jr. took over his father's business when the latter died in 1909. He continued as a leading citizen in Laurium. He was the president of the State Savings Bank and the Palestra (the Laurium ice rink), a director of the Laurium Park Association, and on the board of directors of the Calumet Public Hospital.

The J. Vivian Jr. and Company was in business until 1936.

== Description ==
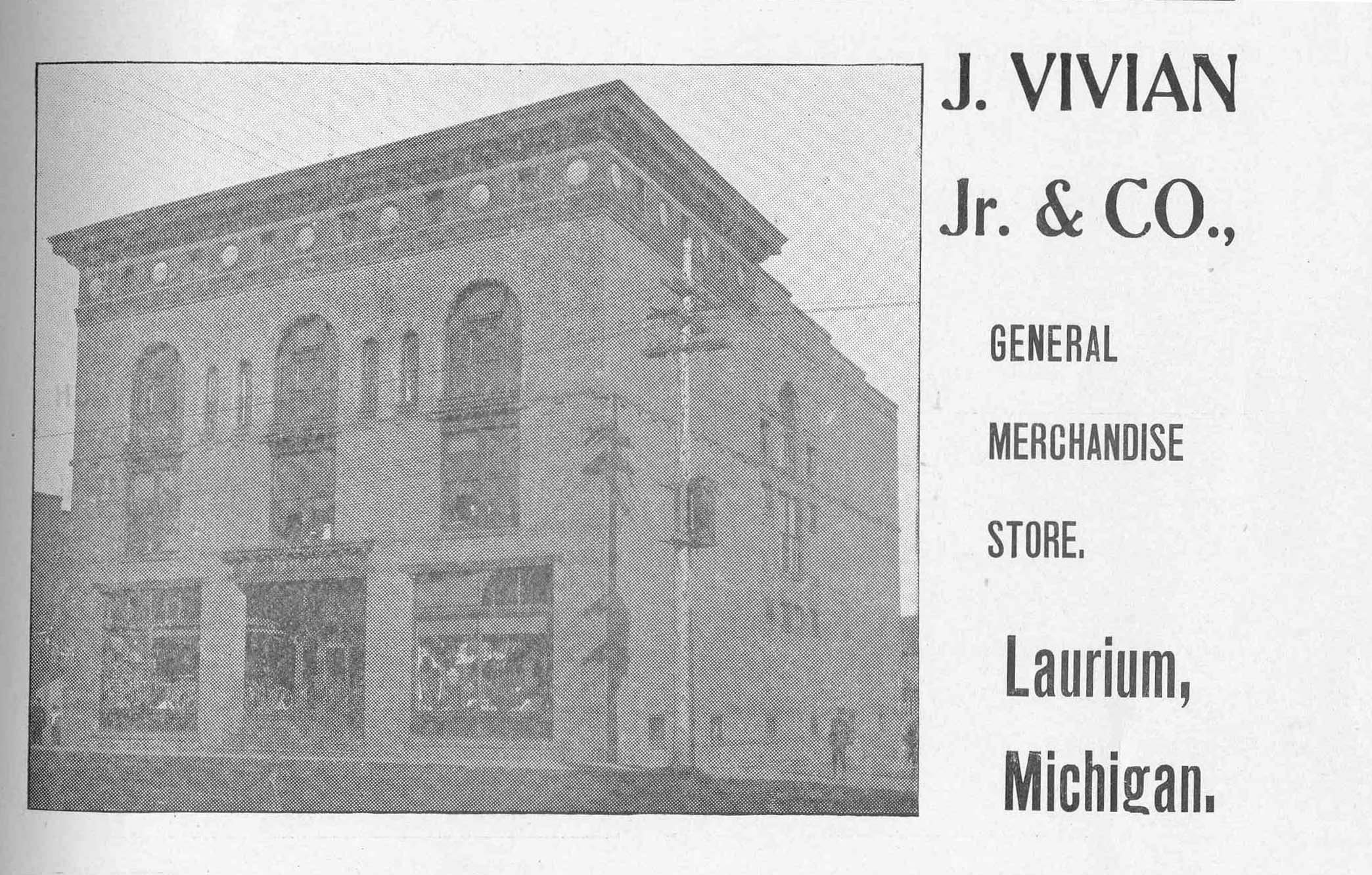
J. Vivian Jr. & Co. Building, c. 1900

The J. Vivian Jr. and Company building was constructed in multiple stages. The original building, dating from 1894, was two stories tall and three bays wide, measuring 58 feet across. This soon proved too small, and in 1898 a third story was added to the structure. In 1906, a fourth bay was added on the north side, bringing the total building width to 90 feet. A one-story addition to the rear was completed in 1974.

The building is constructed in an Italian Renaissance Revival design from brick with sandstone trim. The structure has four bays, each with a two-story round-arched window. A cornice features alternating marble medallions and attic windows. Brick and sandstone piers divide the plate glass windows on the first floor.
