= William Josiah MacDonald =

American politician

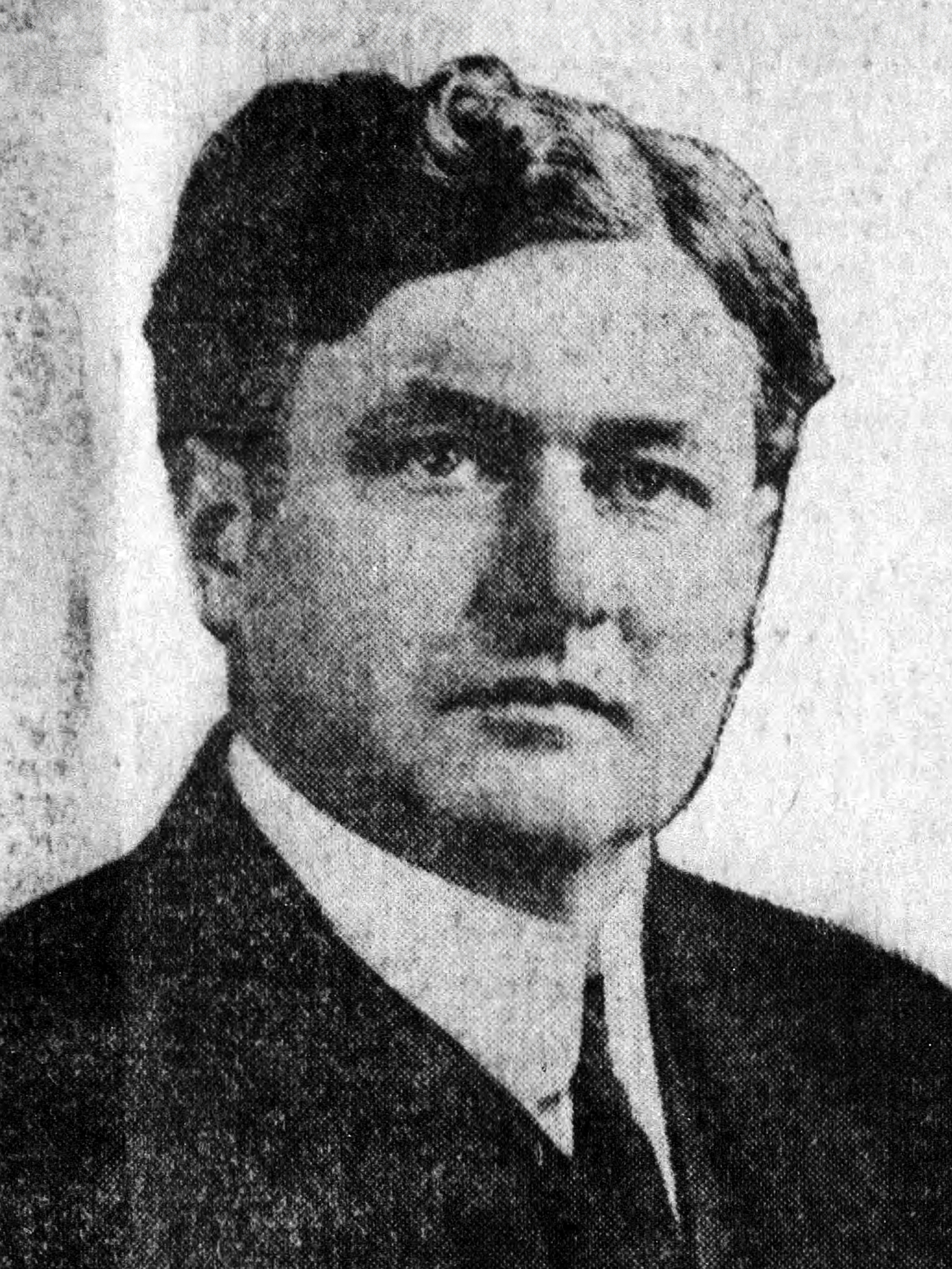

Member of the U.S. House of Representatives from Michigan's 12th district
- In office August 26, 1913 – March 3, 1915
- Preceded by: H. Olin Young
- Succeeded by: W. Frank James

Personal details
- Born: November 17, 1873 Potosi, Wisconsin, U.S.
- Died: March 29, 1946 (aged 72) Chicago, Illinois, U.S.
- Party: Progressive
- Education: University of Minnesota; Georgetown Law School

William Josiah MacDonald (November 17, 1873 – March 29, 1946) was a politician from the U.S. state of Michigan.

MacDonald was born in Potosi, Wisconsin. He attended the common schools and graduated from the high school at Fairmont, Minnesota. He attended the University of Minnesota at Minneapolis and Georgetown Law School in Washington, D.C. He was admitted to the bar and commenced practice at Calumet, Michigan in 1895. He served as prosecuting attorney for Keweenaw County from 1898 to 1904 and prosecuting attorney for Houghton County from 1906 to 1912. In 1911, he was an unsuccessful candidate for circuit judge in the 12th District of Michigan.

In 1912, MacDonald ran as a candidate for the Progressive Party against incumbent Republican H. Olin Young to the United States House of Representatives from the Michigan's 12th congressional district. Although unofficial returns showed that MacDonald had won the seat, some votes were not included in the official count by the state board of canvassers due to a mistake in how MacDonald's name appeared on the ballot in Ontonagon County. H. Olin Young presented credentials as a Member-elect to the 63rd United States Congress and served from March 4, 1913, until his resignation, effective May 16, 1913, while a contest for the seat was pending. Subsequently, the House Committee on Elections unanimously reported a resolution to the full house awarding the 12th District seat to MacDonald, who took the oath of office August 26, 1913 and served until March 3, 1915. In 1914 and again in 1916, MacDonald lost to Republican William F. James. MacDonald and Roy O. Woodruff (10th district) were the only two Michigan residents elected to the U.S. House from the Progressive Party.

MacDonald resumed the practice of law in Springfield, Illinois in 1917. He moved to East St. Louis, Illinois in 1922 and engaged in the practice of his profession. William J. MacDonald died in Chicago and was interred in Graceland Cemetery, Chicago.

U.S. House of Representatives
Preceded by H. Olin Young	United States Representative for the 12th congressional district of Michigan; 1913–1915	Succeeded by W. Frank James
