= Samuel M. Stephenson =

American politician (1831–1907)

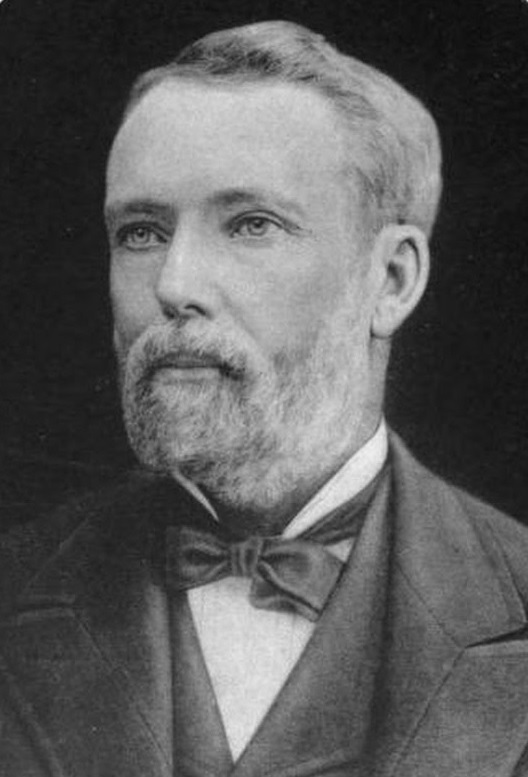
- From Volume 1 of 1905's American Lumbermen.

Member of the U.S. House of Representatives from Michigan
- In office March 4, 1889 – March 3, 1897
- Preceded by: Henry W. Seymour (11th); District established (12th)
- Succeeded by: John Avery (11th); Carlos D. Shelden (12th)
- Constituency: 11th district (1889-93); 12th district (1893-97)

Personal details
- Born: December 23, 1831 Hartland, New Brunswick, Canada
- Died: July 31, 1907 (aged 75) Menominee, Michigan, U.S.
- Party: Republican
- Relatives: Isaac Stephenson (brother)

Samuel Merritt Stephenson (December 23, 1831 – July 31, 1907) was a politician from the U.S. state of Michigan.

== Personal life ==
Samuel Merritt Stephenson was born on December 23, 1831 in Hartland, New Brunswick. Him and his parents moved to Maine and later Delta County, Michigan in 1846. He worked in the lumber industry and moved to Menominee, Michigan, in 1858. He was interested in real estate, lumbering, general merchandising, and agricultural pursuits. He built the Menominee Hotel in 1881 to accommodate visiting lumber buyers; the structure burned down in 1977. After leaving Congress, Stephenson resumed the lumber business. He died in Menominee and is interred there at Riverside Cemetery. In 1876, the then-small settlement of Wacedah north of Menominee was renamed Stephenson in his honor.

His older brother Isaac Stephenson was a U.S. representative (9th district) 1883-89 and U.S. senator Class 3 1907-15 from the state of Wisconsin.

== Political career ==
Stephenson served as a member of the Michigan House of Representatives in 1877 and 1878. He also served in the Michigan Senate in 1879, 1880, 1885, and 1886. He was a delegate to the Republican National Conventions in 1884 and 1888.

In 1888, Stephenson was elected as a Republican from Michigan's 11th congressional district to the 51st United States Congress and was re-elected in 1890 to the 52nd Congress. After redistricting due to the 1890 census, Stephenson was elected from the newly created 12th district in 1892 and 1894. In all, he served from March 4, 1889, to March 3, 1897, in the U.S. House.

He served as chairman of the board of supervisors of Menominee County for several years.

U.S. House of Representatives
Preceded by Henry W. Seymour	United States Representative for the 11th congressional district of Michigan; 1889 – 1893	Succeeded by John Avery
Preceded by None	United States Representative for the 12th congressional district of Michigan; 1893 – 1897	Succeeded by Carlos D. Shelden
