= Luther W. Clarke =

American politician (1825–1869)

Member of the Michigan Senate from the 32nd district
- In office January 5, 1853 – December 31, 1854

Personal details
- Born: c. 1825 Marietta, Ohio
- Died: 1869 (aged 43-44)
- Party: Democratic

Luther W. Clarke (c. 1825 – 1869) was a Michigan politician.

== Early life ==
Clarke was born in about 1825 in Marietta, Ohio. In 1847, Clarke settled in Eagle River, Michigan.

== Career ==
Clarke was a medical doctor. On November 2, 1852, Clarke was elected to the Michigan Senate, where he represented the 32nd district from January 5, 1853 to December 31, 1854. During his term, he served on the Mines and Minerals committee and the State Library committee.

== Death ==
Clarke died in 1869.
