= Jim Howell (Michigan politician) =

American politician

Member of the Michigan House of Representatives from the 94th district
- In office January 1, 1999 – December 31, 2004
- Preceded by: Michael Goschka
- Succeeded by: Roger Kahn

Personal details
- Born: April 29, 1949 (age 77)
- Party: Republican
- Spouse: Maureen
- Education: Delta College (A.A.); Saginaw Valley State University (B.S.); Cooley Law School (J.D.)

Military service
- Branch/service: United States Air Force
- Years of service: 1967-1971
- Rank: Sergeant
- Battles/wars: Vietnam War

James C. Howell (born April 29, 1949) is an American lawyer and politician from Michigan. He is a former member of the Michigan House of Representatives who represented a portion of Saginaw County from 1999 through 2004.

He attended Millington High School and is a 1967 graduate of St. Paul's Seminary in Michigan.

He graduated from Delta College with an Associate of Arts, Saginaw Valley State University with a Bachelor of Science, and from Cooley Law School with a Juris Doctor.

Howell was an air traffic controller in the United States Air Force and an officer with the Saginaw County Sheriff's Department and the Saginaw Police Department from 1972 to 1981. He also was an attorney for Dow Chemical from 1981 to 1983, and practiced privately from 1983 until his election to the House in 1998.

Howell is a vocal advocate for Michigan's system of no-fault auto insurance because his son was critically injured in an accident in 2005.

From 2005 to 2009 he was an Assistant Attorney General of Michigan.

Since 2010 he has served as President of Sammael, Inc.

He was a judicial candidate for the 10th Circuit Court in Michigan in 2010. He lost to James Borchard.
