= Thomas H. Hoatson House =

Historic house in Michigan, United States

- U.S. National Register of Historic Places
- U.S. Historic district – Contributing property
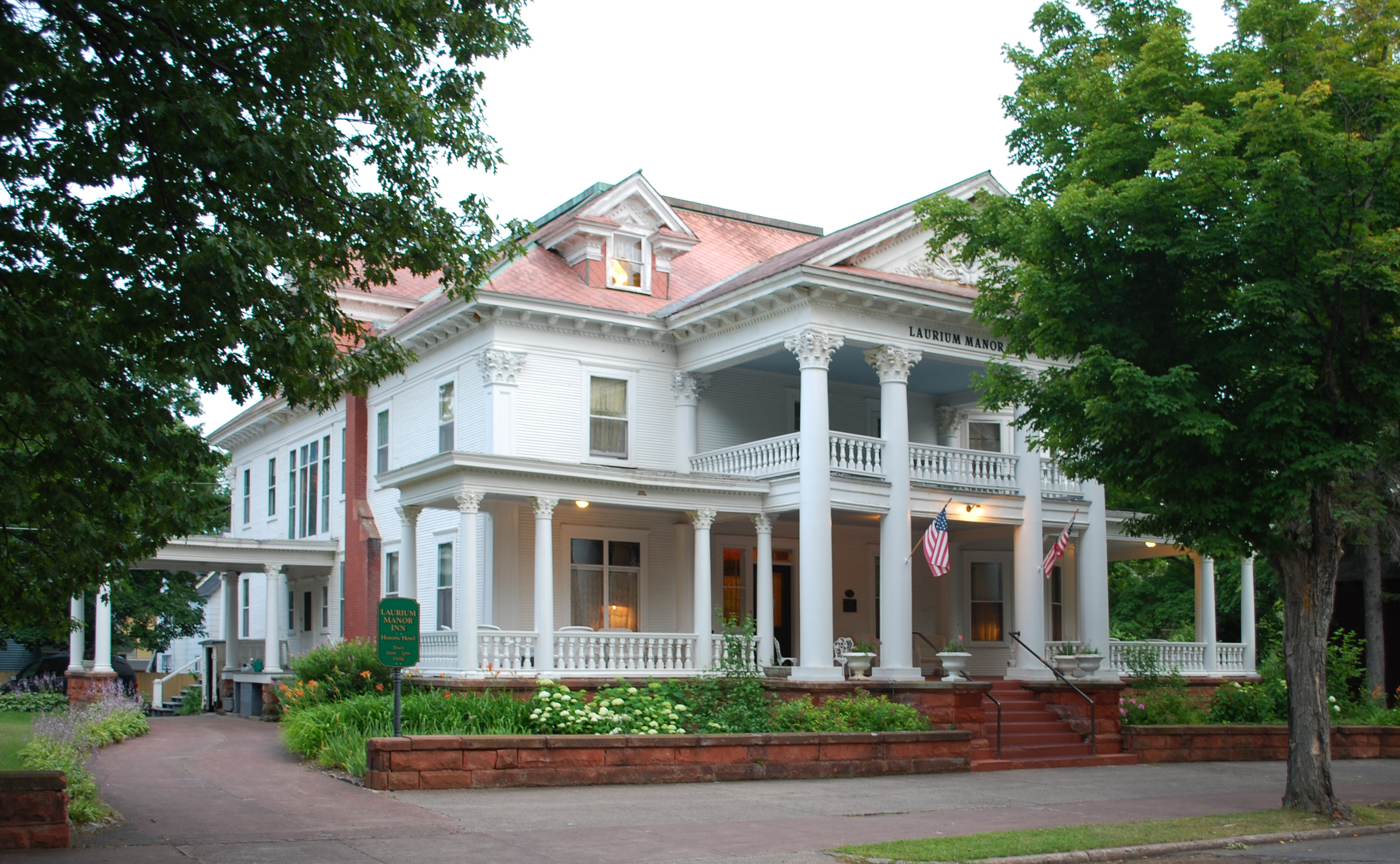
- Thomas H Hoatson House in 2009

- Location within Michigan Location within the United States
- Interactive map
- Location: 320 Tamarack Street, Laurium, Michigan
- Coordinates: 47°14′07″N 88°26′28″W
- Built: 1906
- Architect: Charles Maass
- Architectural style: Classical Revival
- Part of: Laurium Historic District (ID04001578)
- NRHP reference No.: 94001426

Significant dates
- Added to NRHP: December 09, 1994
- Designated CP: January 31, 2005

The Thomas H. Hoatson House (now known as the Laurium Manor Inn) is a house located at 320 Tamarack Street in Laurium, Michigan. It was listed on the National Register of Historic Places in 1994. At 13,000 square feet (1,200 m^{2}), it is the largest mansion in the western Upper Peninsula of Michigan.

== Thomas H. Hoatson ==
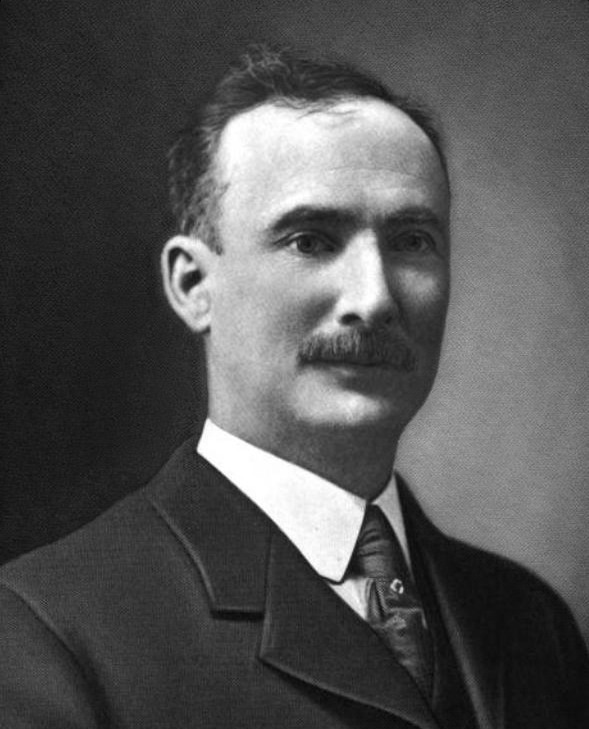
Thomas Hoatson Jr. c. 1911

The house was designed by Charles W. Maass and brother, Frederick A. Maass and built in 1908 for Thomas Hoatson Jr. Hoatson's father, Thomas Sr., emigrated from his native Scotland to Canada in 1852. Thomas Sr. arrived in Bruce Mines, Ontario, where, on October 20, 1861, Thomas Jr. was born. In 1865, the family moved to the United States, first to Houghton, Michigan where Thomas Sr. worked at the Quincy Mine, then to Greenland, Michigan and the Ridge Mine. In 1870, the family moved a final time to Calumet, Michigan, where Thomas Sr. began work as superintendent of the Calumet and Hecla Mining Company, a position he held until his death in 1897.

Thomas Hoatson Jr. attended school in Calumet until he was seventeen, after which he followed in his father's footsteps and went to work for the Calumet and Hecla Mining Company. In March, 1901, Hoatson was involved in organizing the Bisbee Mine in Bisbee, Arizona, along with his elder brother James and other investors. Thomas Hoatson was elected second vice-president of the company. The mine later changed its name to the Calumet and Arizona Mining Company, and proved wildly successful, netting the investors, including Hoatson, substantial wealth.

Despite the Arizona location of the Bisbee mine, Hoatson chose to make his home in the Keweenaw Peninsula. He also served as vice-president of several other mines, as well as president of the Calumet State Bank and a director of the First National Bank of Calumet.

On November 24, 1886, Hoatson married Cornelia Chenowyth of Rockland. The couple had six children: Gussie, Calvin Dean, Chester, James Ramsey, Gertrude, and Grace Lorimer. Thomas Hoatson Jr. died on February 1, 1929.

== History ==
Thomas Hoatson Jr. built his house as a surprise for his wife and children. He hired architect Charles Maass to design the house; the final construction cost was $50,000. The house, completed in 1907, is notable for the technological advancements included in the design.

After Hoatson's death, the house passed through the hands of a series of owners, some of whom stripped the original stained glass and lighting fixtures before 1984. It served as Thomas Funeral Home from 1949 to 1979, owned by the undertaker Maynard R. Hurlburt, but this business was tragically terminated when Maynard killed his wife Jane and grandson Tommy before killing himself. Around 1984, it was purchased by Gerard and Marcella Brohman, who purchased as a private residence. Marcella lovingly decorated the mansion with many antique furnishings. In 1989, current owners Dave and Julie Sprenger purchased the Hoatson House and turned it into a bed-and-breakfast under the name "Laurium Manor Inn." The house is open to the public for accommodation and for tours, and is a Heritage Site associated with the Keweenaw National Historical Park.

== Description ==
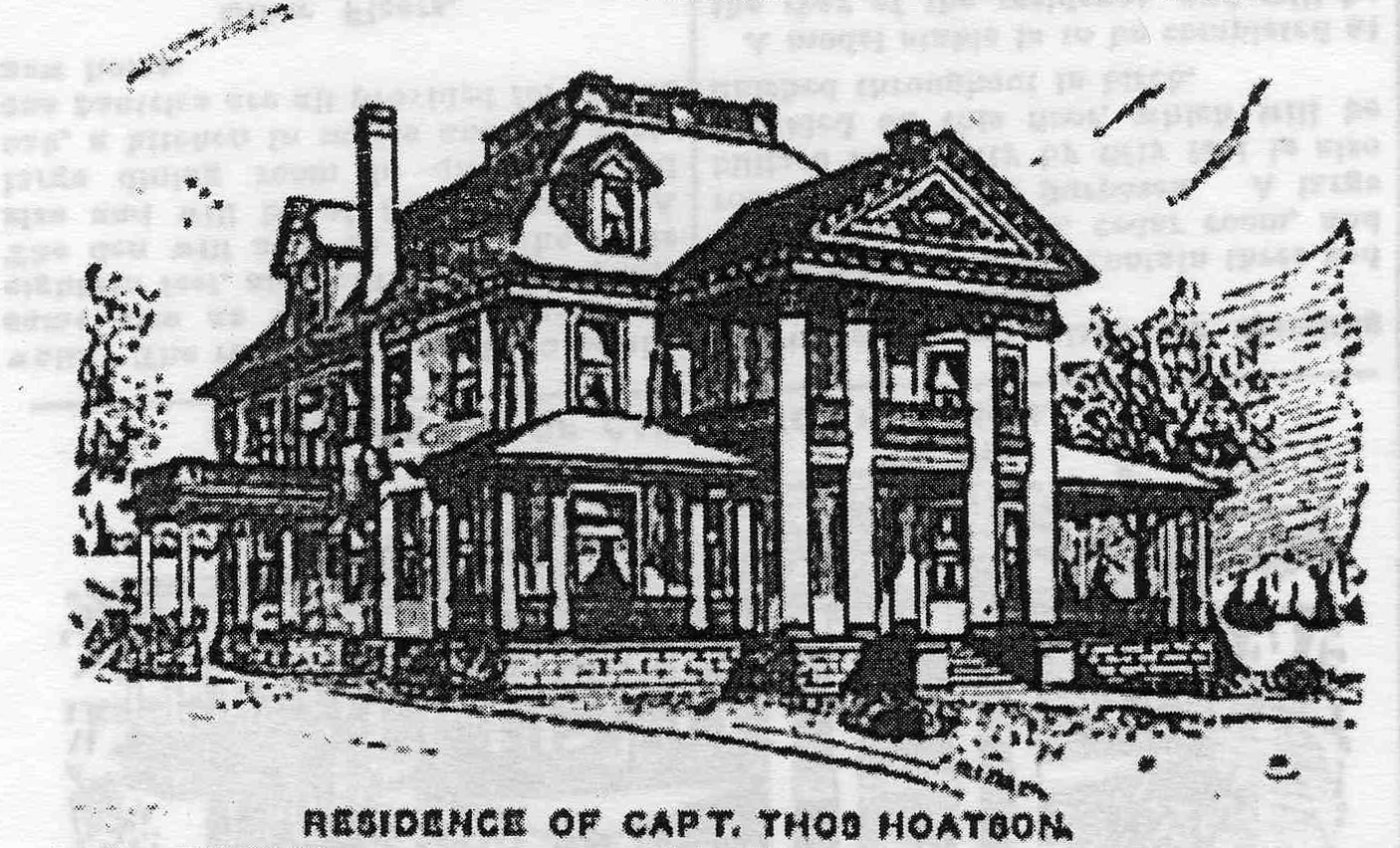
Drawing of the Hoatson House from the Houghton Daily Mining Gazette, December 23, 1906

The Hoatson House is a 2 1/2-story wood-frame structure of Neoclassical design. The house is rectangular with a red sandstone foundation and clapboard exterior. The front facade is symmetric, with a central portico with Corinthian columns sheltering the main entrance and a one-story porch to each side. A hipped roof with gabled dormers sits atop the house.

The interior has 45 rooms covering 13,000 square feet, and boasts exceptionally fine detailing. The first floor contains a library measuring 23 feet (7.0 m) by 23 feet (7.0 m), a dining room measuring 17 feet (5.2 m) by 23 feet (7.0 m), and a reception hall measuring 12 feet (3.7 m) by 40 feet (12 m) with triple staircase. Also on the first floor are a den with an iridescent tile fireplace surround and painted murals, a kitchen, and pantry space. The second floor had six bedrooms and three bathrooms. The third floor had three more bedrooms, a bathroom, a cedar room, and a billiard room measuring 50 feet (15 m) by 50 feet.
