= Percy Ross =

American philanthropist (1916–2001)

- Born: November 22, 1916; Laurium, Michigan, U.S.
- Died: November 10, 2001 (aged 84); Edina, Minnesota
- Occupation: Entrepreneur
- Known for: Philanthropy

Percy Ross (November 22, 1916 – November 10, 2001) was an American multi-millionaire. He arrived in St. Louis Park, Minnesota around 1946–1947. He was associated with Ross and Ross Auctioneers. In 1959 he purchased a company called Poly-Tech, which made polyethylene plastic bags. He died in Edina, Minnesota on November 10, 2001.

Ross was best known for his philanthropy, particularly through his Thanks a Million newspaper column, wherein he would often grant requests for readers in need. Thanks a Million ran in more than 800 publications for 17 years. It eventually became a syndicated radio show running on over 400 radio stations. From the column and shows, he gave away an estimated US$20 to $30 million over a period of 17 years.

Ross was born and raised in Laurium, Michigan, on the Keweenaw Peninsula of Michigan's upper peninsula, about 10 miles from Michigan Technological University.

== General References ==
- Percy Ross, Columnist and Philanthropist, Dies at 84
- Percy Ross, 84; Loved Giving Away Money
- Thanks a Million
- Zany Millionaire Percy Ross Has a Simple Credo—by His Gifts Ye Shall Know Him
- "Percy Ross Wants to Give You Money!" (Longreads)
