= Kenneth Horn =

American politician

Ken Horn

Member of the Michigan Senate from the 32nd district
- In office January 1, 2015 – December 31, 2022
- Preceded by: Roger Kahn
- Succeeded by: Jon Bumstead

Member of the Michigan House of Representatives from the 94th district
- In office January 1, 2007 – December 31, 2012
- Preceded by: Roger Kahn
- Succeeded by: Tim Kelly

Personal details
- Born: July 10, 1959 (age 67) Detroit, Michigan, U.S.
- Party: Republican
- Spouse: Veronica
- Education: Concordia University, Ann Arbor (BA); Saginaw Valley State University (MPA)
- Website: Official website

Ken Horn (born July 10, 1959) is an American politician from the state of Michigan. A Republican, Horn represent the 32nd district of the Michigan Senate from 2015 to 2022. He is also a former member of the Michigan House of Representatives for the 94th District (encompassing part of Saginaw County) from 2007 through 2012.

Horn first served as on the Saginaw County Board of Commissioners from the 2nd district from January 1993 to December 2006, and operated a restaurant in Frankenmuth. He was elected to the House in 2006, and re-elected in 2008 and 2010. In 2014, Horn was elected to the Senate, representing Saginaw County and the westernmost portion of Genesee County.

Horn received his bachelor's degree from Concordia University, Ann Arbor. He is the son of immigrants from the former East Germany and resides in Frankenmuth.
