= Michigan's 12th congressional district =

U.S. House district for Michigan

Coordinates: 42°12′19″N 83°26′59″W

- Interactive map of district boundaries since January 3, 2023
- Representative: Rashida Tlaib; D–Detroit
- Population (2025): 738,672
- Median household income: $61,512
- Ethnicity: 46.0% White; 44.4% Black; 3.8% Two or more races; 3.3% Hispanic; 1.8% Asian; 0.7% other
- Cook PVI: D+21

Michigan's 12th congressional district is a U.S. congressional district in Michigan.

The district was first created during the reapportionment and redistricting after the 1890 census. From 2003 to 2013, it was located in Detroit's inner suburbs to the north, along the Interstate 696 corridor in Macomb and Oakland counties, and a portion of Macomb north of the corridor. District boundaries were redrawn in 1993 and 2003 due to reapportionment following the censuses of 1990 and 2000. After Michigan's congressional map was redrawn in 2022, the 12th lost Ann Arbor and most of its suburbs and was re-centered around the cities of Detroit and Dearborn.

During the 113th Congress (2013 to 2015), the district was represented by John Dingell (D). He was a congressman for this and other districts for 59 years, making him the longest-serving member of Congress in U.S. history. He was succeeded by his wife, Debbie Dingell, who currently represents the 6th congressional district. The current district is represented by Democrat Rashida Tlaib, who had previously represented the old 13th district. With a Cook Partisan Voting Index rating of D+21, it is one of the most Democratic districts in Michigan.

== Composition ==
For the 118th and successive Congresses (based on redistricting following the 2020 census), the district contains all or portions of the following counties and municipalities:

Oakland County (6)

Beverly Hills, Bingham Farms, Franklin, Lathrup Village, Southfield, Southfield Township

Wayne County (8)

Dearborn, Dearborn Heights (part; also 13th), Detroit (part; also 13th), Garden City, Inkster, Livonia, Redford Township, Westland

== Recent election results from statewide races ==
Year	Office	Results
2008	President	Obama 76% - 23%
2012	President	Obama 77% - 23%
2014	Senate	Peters 76% - 21%
2014	Governor	Schauer 68% - 31%
2014	Secretary of State	Dillard 66% - 31%
2014	Attorney General	Totten 68% - 30%
2016	President	Clinton 72% - 25%
2018	Senate	Stabenow 74% - 24%
2018	Governor	Whitmer 75% - 22%
2018	Attorney General	Nessel 73% - 24%
2020	President	Biden 74% - 25%
2020	Senate	Peters 73% - 25%
2022	Governor	Whitmer 76% - 23%
2022	Secretary of State	Benson 76% - 22%
2022	Attorney General	Nessel 74% - 24%
2024	President	Harris 67% - 29%
2024	Senate	Slotkin 68% - 27%

== List of members representing the district ==
Representative	Party	Years	Cong ress	Electoral history	District location
District created March 4, 1893
Samuel M. Stephenson (Menominee)	Republican	March 4, 1893 – March 3, 1897	53rd 54th	Redistricted from the 11th district and re-elected in 1892. Re-elected in 1894. Retired.	1893–1903 [data missing]
Carlos D. Shelden (Houghton)	Republican	March 4, 1897 – March 3, 1903	55th 56th 57th	Elected in 1896. Re-elected in 1898. Re-elected in 1900. Lost renomination.	1893–1903 [data missing]
H. Olin Young (Ishpeming)	Republican	March 4, 1903 – May 16, 1913	58th 59th 60th 61st 62nd 63rd	Elected in 1902. Re-elected in 1904. Re-elected in 1906. Re-elected in 1908. Re-elected in 1910. Resigned while a contest for the seat was pending. Lost election contest.	1903–1913 [data missing]
Vacant		May 16, 1913 – August 26, 1913	63rd	Due to a mistake in how the name of William J. MacDonald appeared on the ballot in Ontonagon County some votes were not included in the official count by the state board of canvassers, even though their inclusion in unofficial returns showed MacDonald had won. Subsequently, the United States House Committee on Elections unanimously reported a resolution to the full house awarding the seat to MacDonald.	1913–1943 [data missing]
William J. MacDonald (Calumet)	Progressive	August 26, 1913 – March 3, 1915	63rd	Won election contest. Lost re-election.	1913–1943 [data missing]
W. Frank James (Hancock)	Republican	March 4, 1915 – January 3, 1935	64th 65th 66th 67th 68th 69th 70th 71st 72nd 73rd	Elected in 1914. Re-elected in 1916. Re-elected in 1918. Re-elected in 1920. Re-elected in 1922. Re-elected in 1924. Re-elected in 1926. Re-elected in 1928. Re-elected in 1930. Re-elected in 1932. Lost re-election.	1913–1943 [data missing]
Frank Hook (Ironwood)	Democratic	January 3, 1935 – January 3, 1943	74th 75th 76th 77th	Elected in 1934. Re-elected in 1936. Re-elected in 1938. Re-elected in 1940. Lost re-election.	1913–1943 [data missing]
John B. Bennett (Ontonagon)	Republican	January 3, 1943 – January 3, 1945	78th	Elected in 1942. Lost re-election.	1943–1993 [data missing]
Frank Hook (Ironwood)	Democratic	January 3, 1945 – January 3, 1947	79th	Elected in 1944. Lost re-election.	1943–1993 [data missing]
John B. Bennett (Ontonagon)	Republican	January 3, 1947 – August 9, 1964	80th 81st 82nd 83rd 84th 85th 86th 87th 88th	Elected in 1946. Re-elected in 1948. Re-elected in 1950. Re-elected in 1952. Re-elected in 1954. Re-elected in 1956. Re-elected in 1958. Re-elected in 1960. Re-elected in 1962. Died.	1943–1993 [data missing]
Vacant		August 9, 1964 – January 3, 1965	88th		1943–1993 [data missing]
James G. O'Hara (Utica)	Democratic	January 3, 1965 – January 3, 1977	89th 90th 91st 92nd 93rd 94th	Redistricted from the 7th district and re-elected in 1964. Re-elected in 1966. Re-elected in 1968. Re-elected in 1970. Re-elected in 1972. Re-elected in 1974. Retired.	1943–1993 [data missing]
David Bonior (Mount Clemens)	Democratic	January 3, 1977 – January 3, 1993	95th 96th 97th 98th 99th 100th 101st 102nd	Elected in 1976. Re-elected in 1978. Re-elected in 1980. Re-elected in 1982. Re-elected in 1984. Re-elected in 1986. Re-elected in 1988. Re-elected in 1990. Redistricted to the 10th district.	1943–1993 [data missing]
Sander Levin (Royal Oak)	Democratic	January 3, 1993 – January 3, 2013	103rd 104th 105th 106th 107th 108th 109th 110th 111th 112th	Redistricted from the 17th district and re-elected in 1992. Re-elected in 1994. Re-elected in 1996. Re-elected in 1998. Re-elected in 2000. Re-elected in 2002. Re-elected in 2004. Re-elected in 2006. Re-elected in 2008. Re-elected in 2010. Redistricted to the 9th district.	1993–2003 2003-2013
John Dingell(Dearborn)	Democratic	January 3, 2013 – January 3, 2015	113th	Redistricted from the 15th district and re-elected in 2012. Retired.	2013–2023
Debbie Dingell (Dearborn)	Democratic	January 3, 2015 – January 3, 2023	114th 115th 116th 117th	Elected in 2014. Re-elected in 2016. Re-elected in 2018. Re-elected in 2020. Redistricted to the 6th district.	2013–2023
Rashida Tlaib (Detroit)	Democratic	January 3, 2023 – present	118th 119th	Redistricted from the 13th district and re-elected in 2022. Re-elected in 2024. Re-elected in 2026.	2023–present

== Recent election results ==
=== 2012 ===
Michigan's 12th congressional district, 2012
Party	Candidate	Votes	%
Democratic	John D. Dingell (incumbent)	216,884	67.9
Republican	Cynthia Kallgren	92,472	29.0
Libertarian	Richard Secula	9,867	3.1
Total votes		319,223	100.0
Democratic hold			

=== 2014 ===
Michigan's 12th congressional district, 2014
Party	Candidate	Votes	%
Democratic	Debbie Dingell	134,346	65.0
Republican	Terry Bowman	64,716	31.3
Independent	Gary Walkowicz	5,039	2.4
Libertarian	Bhagwan Dashairya	2,559	1.3
Total votes		206,660	100.0
Democratic hold			

=== 2016 ===
Michigan's 12th congressional district, 2016
Party	Candidate	Votes	%
Democratic	Debbie Dingell (incumbent)	211,378	64.3
Republican	Jeff Jones	96,104	29.3
Working Class	Gary Walkowicz	9,183	2.8
Libertarian	Tom Bagwell	7,489	2.3
Green	Dylan Calewarts	4,377	1.3
Independent	Ejaz Virk (write-in)	11	0.0
Total votes		328,542	100.0
Democratic hold			

=== 2018 ===
Michigan's 12th congressional district, 2018
Party	Candidate	Votes	%
Democratic	Debbie Dingell (incumbent)	200,588	68.1
Republican	Jeff Jones	85,115	28.9
Working Class	Gary Walkowicz	6,712	2.3
Independent	Niles Niemuth	2,213	0.7
Total votes		294,628	100.0
Democratic hold			

=== 2020 ===
Michigan's 12th congressional district, 2020
Party	Candidate	Votes	%
Democratic	Debbie Dingell (incumbent)	254,957	66.4
Republican	Jeff Jones	117,719	30.7
Working Class	Gary Walkowicz	11,147	2.9
Total votes		383,823	100.0
Democratic hold			

=== 2022 ===
Michigan's 12th congressional district, 2022
Party	Candidate	Votes	%
Democratic	Rashida Tlaib (incumbent)	196,643	70.8
Republican	Steven Elliott	72,888	26.2
Working Class	Gary Walkowicz	8,046	2.9
Total votes		277,577	100.0
Democratic hold			

=== 2024 ===
Michigan's 12th congressional district, 2024
Party	Candidate	Votes	%
Democratic	Rashida Tlaib (incumbent)	253,354	69.7
Republican	James Hooper	92,490	25.4
Working Class	Gary Walkowicz	9,401	2.6
Green	Brenda Sanders	8,254	2.3
Total votes		363,499	100.0
Democratic hold			

== Historical district boundaries ==
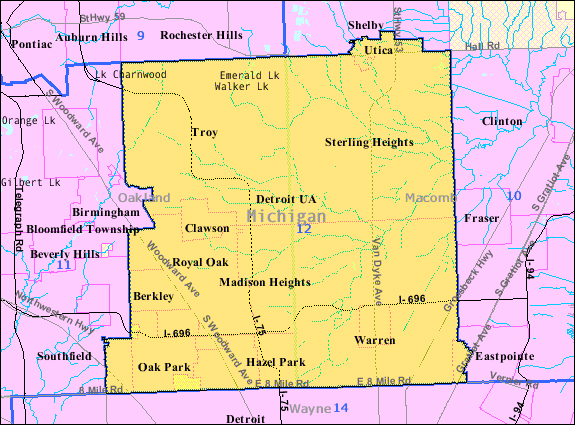
1993–2003

2003–2013

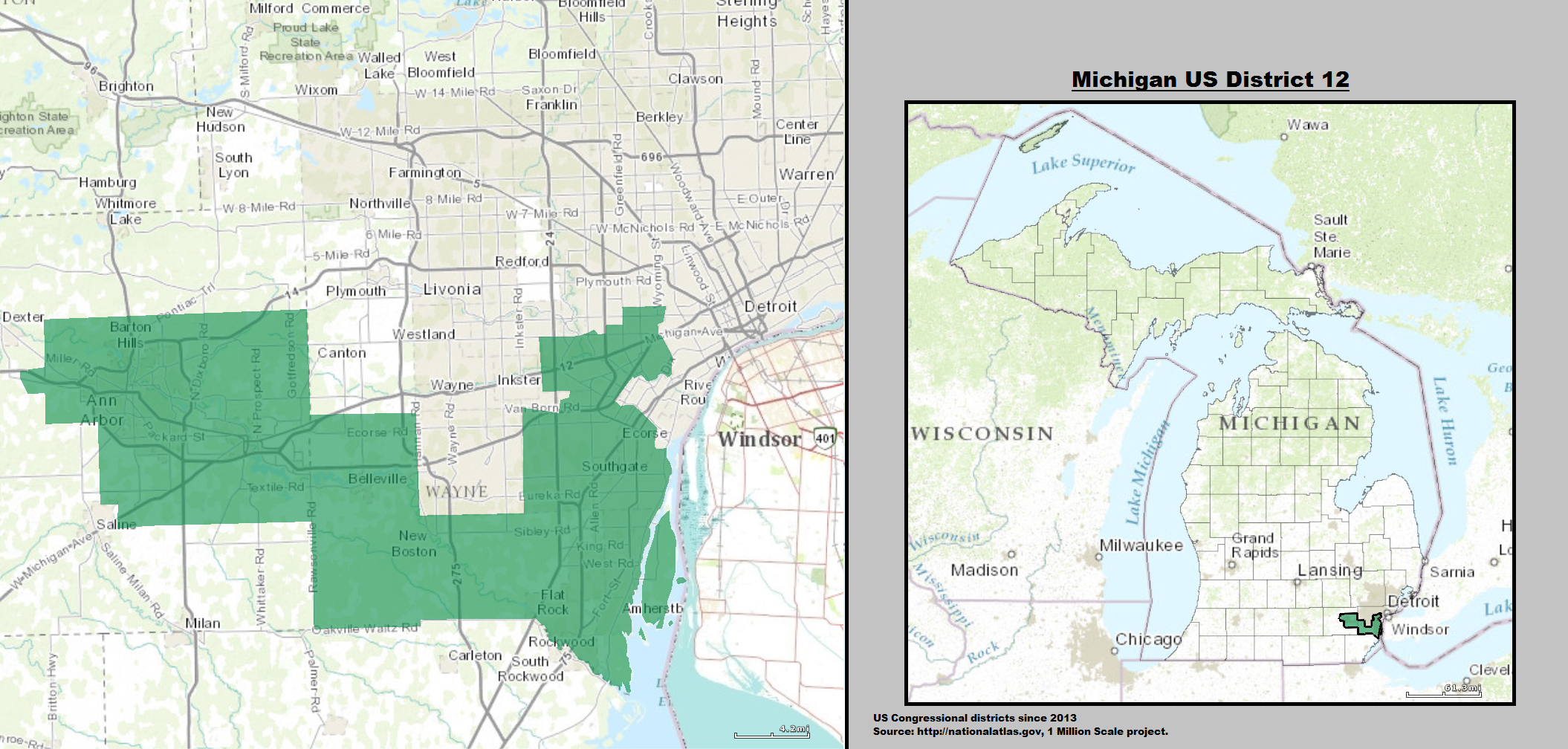
2013–2023

== See also ==
- Michigan's congressional districts
- List of United States congressional districts
- Martis, Kenneth C. (1989). The Historical Atlas of Political Parties in the United States Congress. New York: Macmillan Publishing Company.
- Martis, Kenneth C. (1982). The Historical Atlas of United States Congressional Districts. New York: Macmillan Publishing Company.
