= H. Olin Young =

American politician

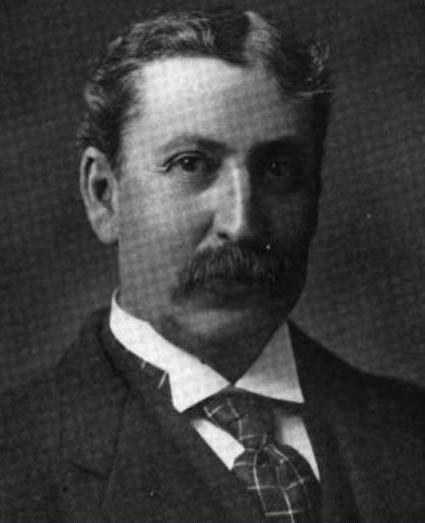
- From Volume II of 1900's Livingstone's History of the Republican Party

Member of the U.S. House of Representatives from Michigan's 12th district
- In office March 4, 1903 – May 16, 1913
- Preceded by: Carlos D. Shelden
- Succeeded by: William Josiah MacDonald

Personal details
- Born: August 4, 1850 New Albion, New York, U.S.
- Died: August 5, 1917 (aged 67) Ishpeming, Michigan, U.S.
- Party: Republican

Horace Olin Young (August 4, 1850 – August 5, 1917) was a politician from the U.S. state of Michigan.

Young was born in New Albion, New York, the son of State Senator Horace C. Young (1806–1879) and Laura P. (Walker) Young (1808–1890). He attended the common schools and high school of New Albion. He also attended Chamberlain Military Institute in Randolph, New York.

Young then moved to Ishpeming, Michigan and engaged in accounting, studied law, was admitted to the bar in 1879 and commenced practice in Ishpeming. He was a member of the Michigan House of Representatives from Marquette County 2nd District, 1879–80 and prosecuting attorney of Marquette County 1886-1896.

In 1902, Young was elected as a Republican from Michigan's 12th congressional district to the 58th United States Congress. He was subsequently re-elected to the four succeeding Congresses, holding office from March 4, 1903, to March 3, 1913. Young presented credentials as a Member-elect to the 63rd Congress and served from March 4, 1913, until his resignation, effective May 16, 1913, while a contest for the seat was pending. Due to a mistake in how the name of Progressive candidate William Josiah MacDonald appeared on the ballot in Ontonagon County, some votes were not included in the official count by the state board of canvassers, even though their inclusion in unofficial returns showed MacDonald had won. Subsequently, the House Committee on Elections unanimously reported a resolution to the full house awarding the 12th District seat to MacDonald, who took the oath of office August 26, 1913.

After leaving Congress, Young served as president of the Miners’ National Bank in Ishpeming. He died the day after his 67th birthday in Ishpeming and is interred there at the City Cemetery.

U.S. House of Representatives
Preceded by Carlos D. Shelden	United States Representative for the 12th congressional district of Michigan; 1903 – 1913	Succeeded by William J. MacDonald
