= Laurium, Michigan =

- Village
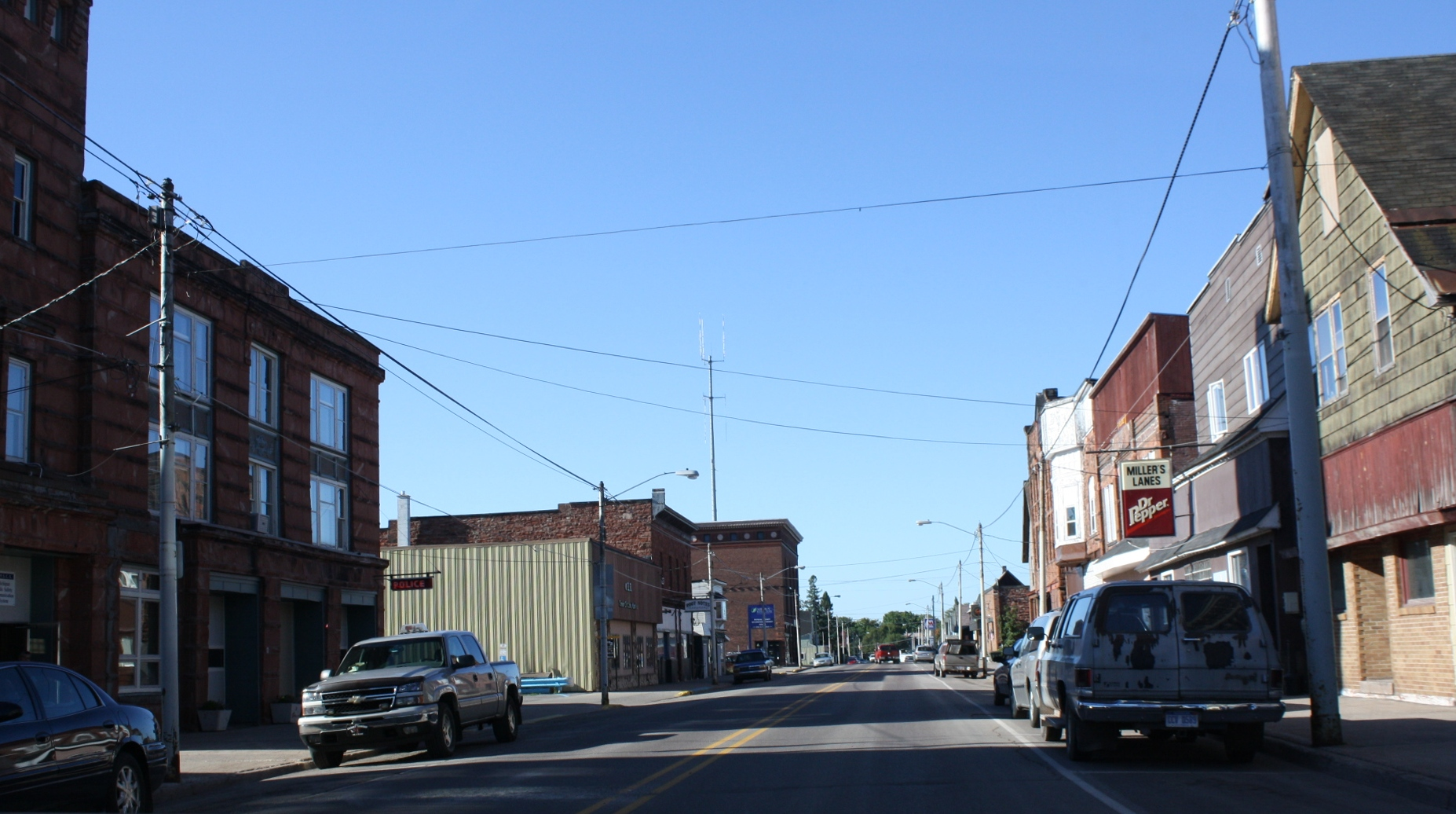
- Downtown Laurium

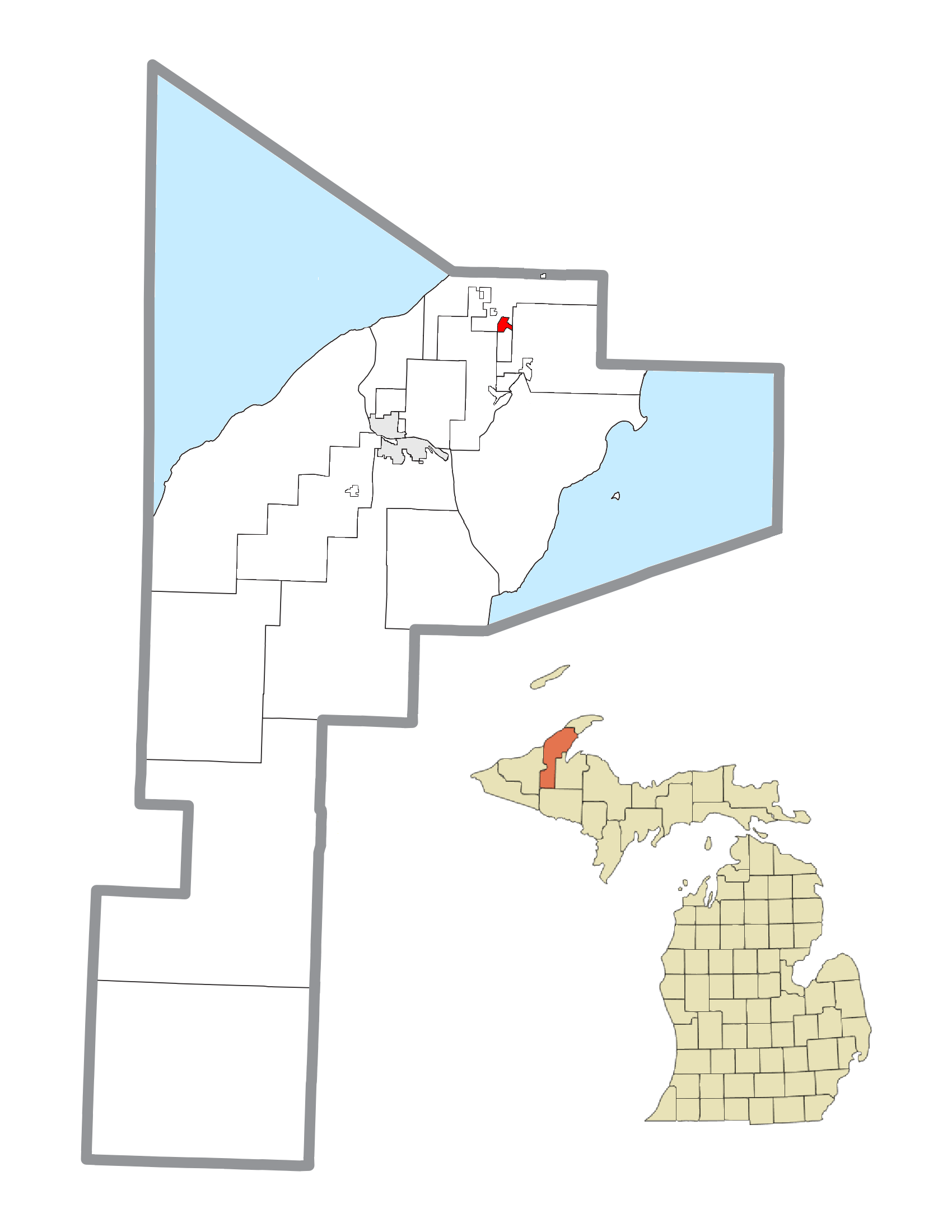
- Location within Houghton County

- Location within the state of Michigan
- Coordinates: 47°14′14″N 88°26′24″W
- Country: United States
- State: Michigan
- County: Houghton
- Township: Calumet
- Incorporated: 1889 (as Calumet); 1895 (as Laurium)

Government
  - Type: Village council
  - President: John Sullivan
  - Village Manager: Ian Lewis

Area
  - Total: 0.65 sq mi (1.68 km^{2})
  - Land: 0.65 sq mi (1.68 km^{2})
  - Water: 0 sq mi (0.00 km^{2})
- Elevation: 1,237 ft (377 m)

Population (2020)
  - Total: 1,864
  - Density: 2,871/sq mi (1,108.4/km^{2})
- Time zone: UTC-5 (Eastern (EST))
  - Summer (DST): UTC-4 (EDT)
- ZIP code(s): 49913 (Calumet)
- Area code: 906
- FIPS code: 26-46360
- GNIS feature ID: 0630196
- Website: Official website
- Laurium Historic District
- U.S. National Register of Historic Places
- U.S. Historic district
- Location: Roughly bounded by Calumet, Stable, N. Florida, and Isle Royale Sts., Laurium, Michigan
- Coordinates: 47°14′10″N 88°26′26″W
- Built: 1877
- Architect: Paul Roehm, et al.
- Architectural style: Late Victorian, Homestead-temple house
- NRHP reference No.: 04001578
- Added to NRHP: January 31, 2005

Laurium (/ˈlɔːriəm/; LAW-ri-um or /ˈleɪriəm/ LAIR-i-um) is a village in Calumet Township, Houghton County in the U.S. state of Michigan, in the center of the Keweenaw Peninsula. As of the 2020 census, Laurium had a population of 1,864.

The village is mostly surrounded by Calumet Township, with a small portion bordering Schoolcraft Township on the east. The portion of Calumet Township south of Laurium is considered part of the Florida (or Florida Location) unincorporated community.

== History ==
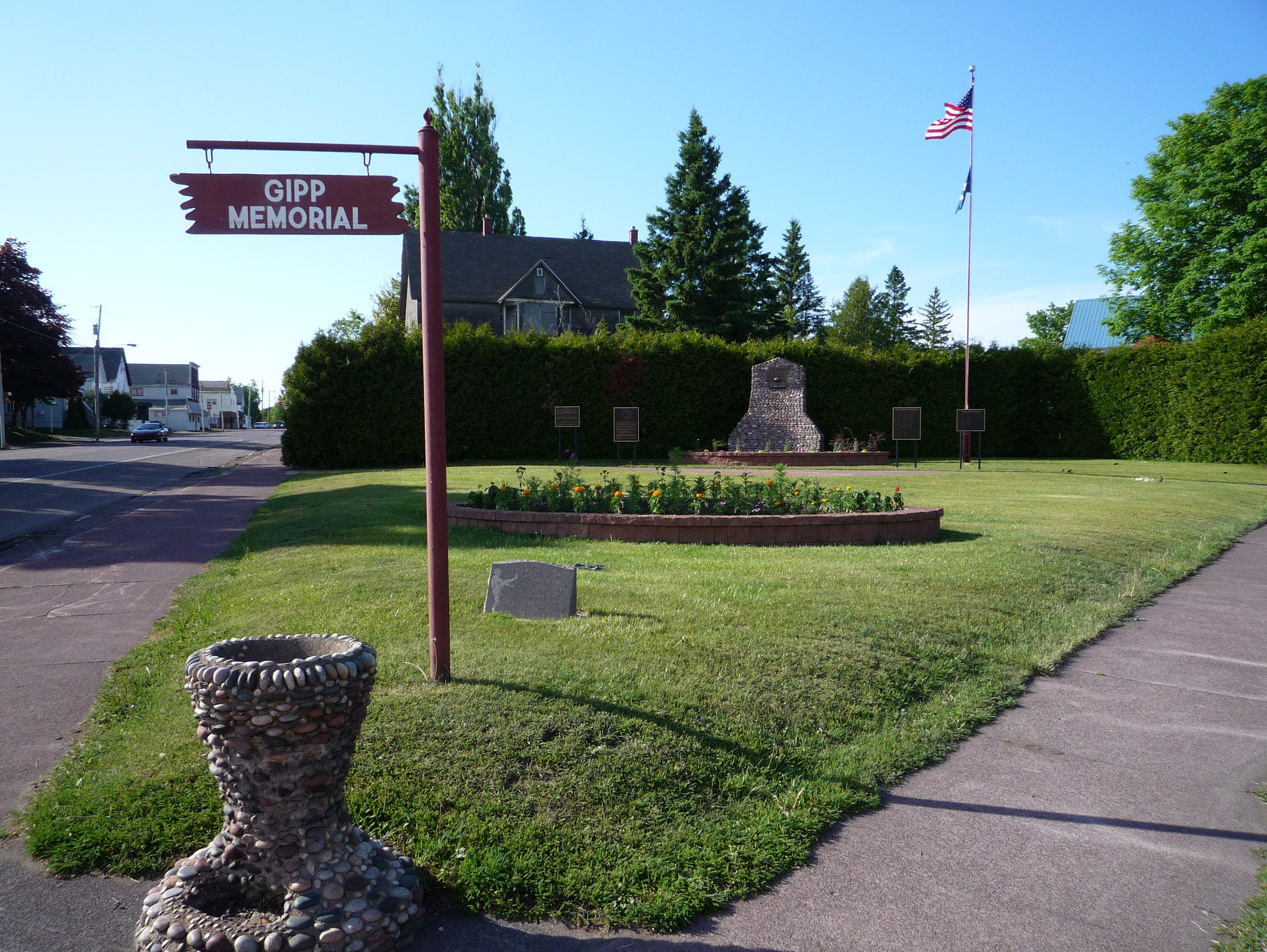
George Gipp Memorial

Until 1895, Laurium was known as "Calumet" (not to be confused with the present nearby town of Calumet, Michigan, which was known as "Red Jacket" until it adopted the name Calumet in 1929). In 1895 the legislature changed Calumet's name to Laurium, after the famous mining town in ancient Greece. Laurium is located in the center of the Copper Country, the first major copper mining region in the United States. It was founded as a company town serving the Laurium copper mine, which later became part of the Calumet & Hecla mine. The town was generally home to the wealthier members of Keweenaw society, such as mine owners and captains. Although the mines have long since closed, the town still sports many large houses and mansions built by the wealthy mine owners. Today, many of the houses are participating locations in the Keweenaw National Historical Park.

The population in 1900 was 5643, of whom 2286 were foreign-born.

Noted 20th-century football player George Gipp ("the Gipper") was born in Laurium. A small memorial to the football legend is located on the corner of Lake Linden Avenue and Tamarack Street and his grave is in nearby Lake View Cemetery.

The Palestra was a noted hockey arena, built in Laurium in 1904. It is thought to have been the first purpose-built indoor hockey venue in the United States. In 1921, the entire arena was moved to Marquette, Michigan, and remained there until being razed in 1974.

== Laurium Historic District ==
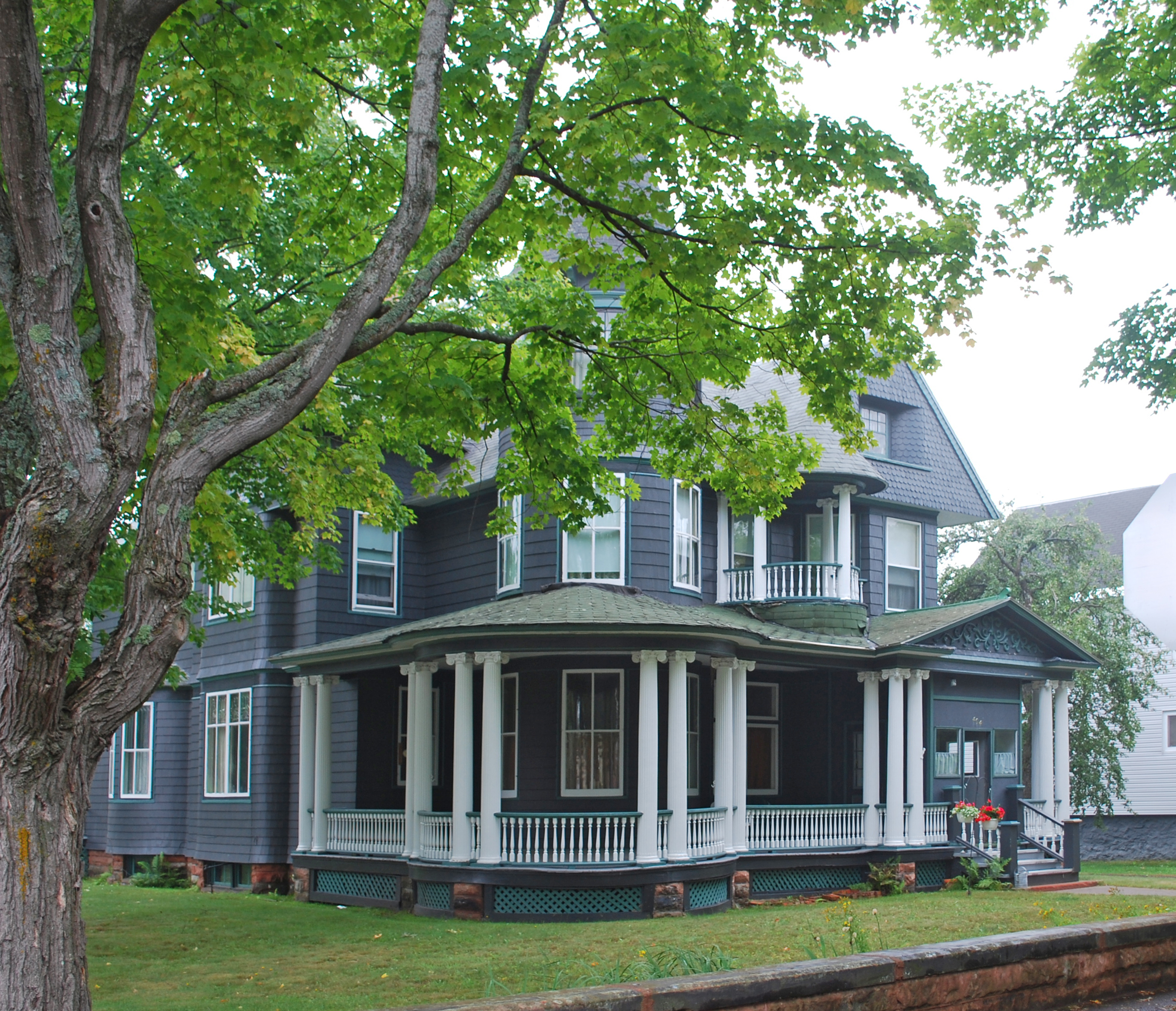
House

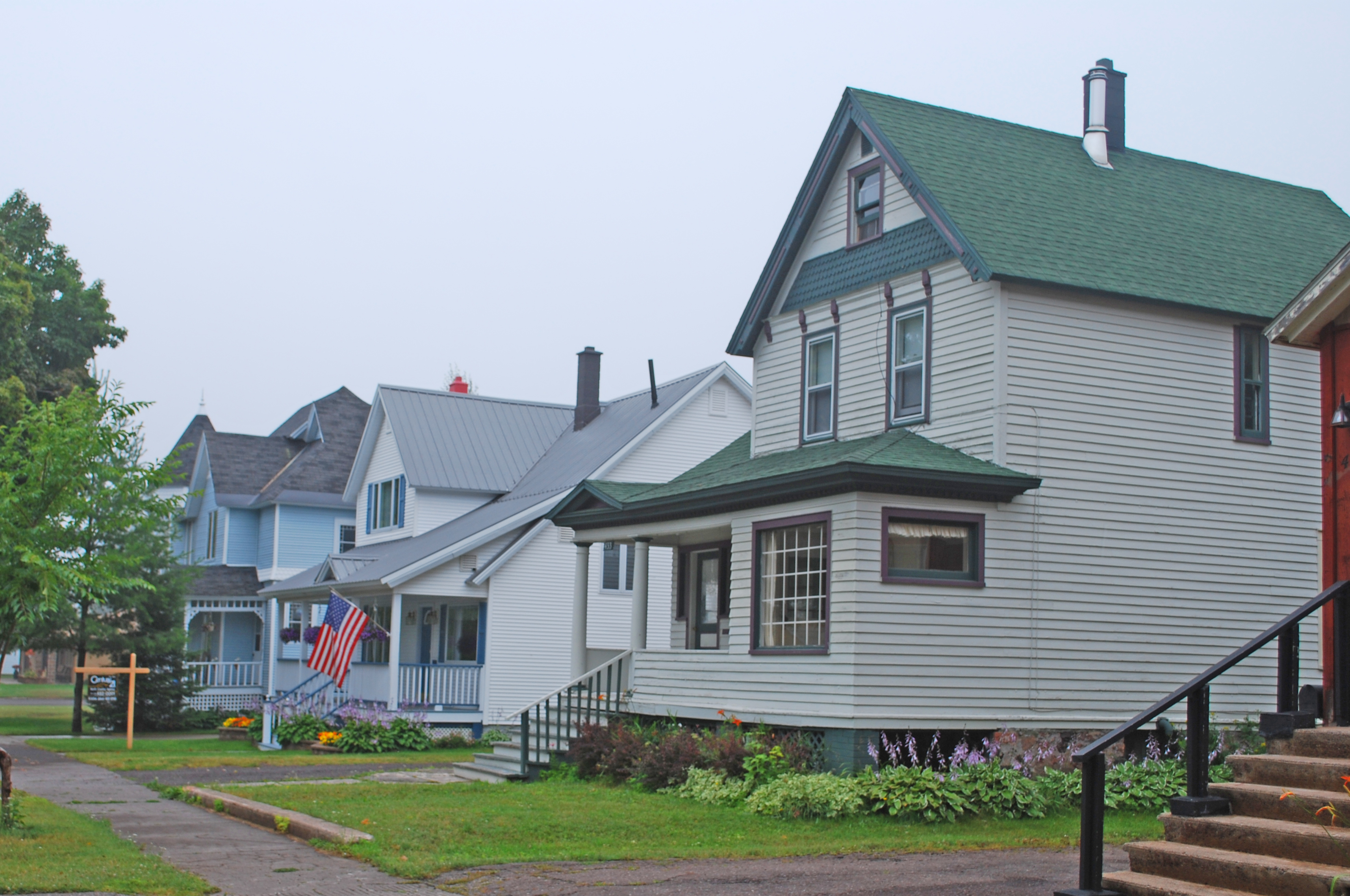
Streetscape

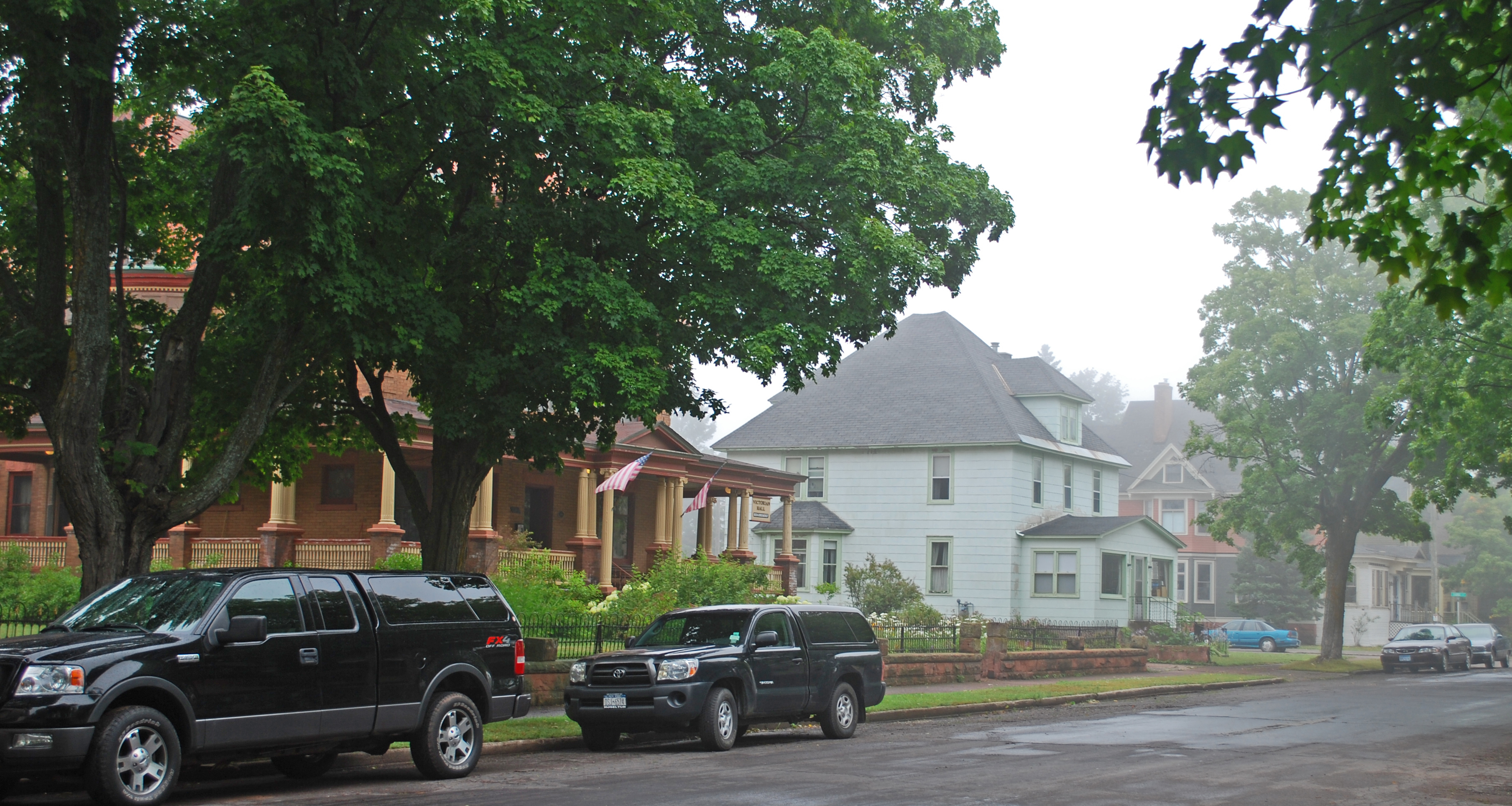
Streetscape

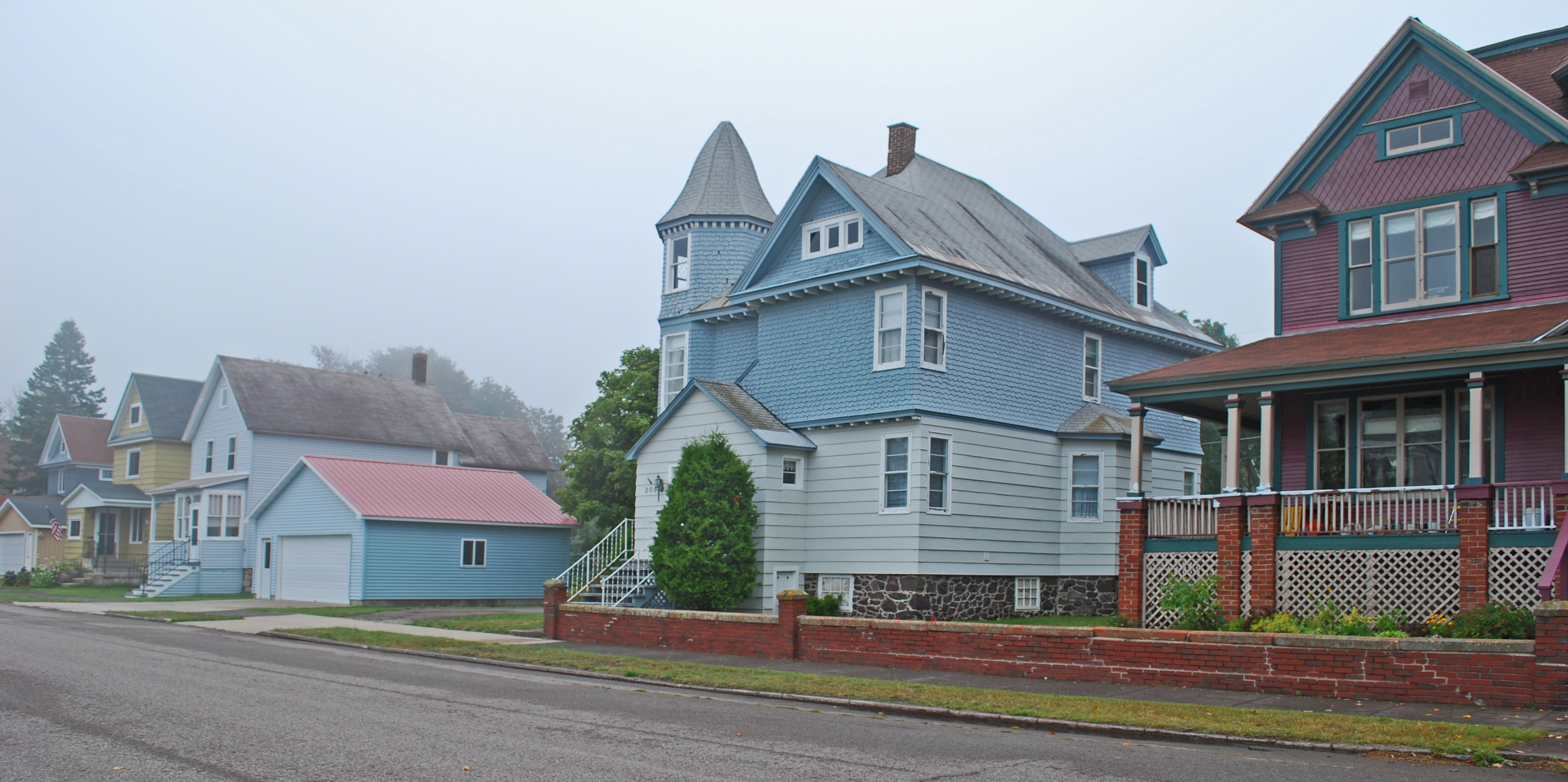
Streetscape on Pewabic Street

In 2005, the Laurium Historic District was listed on the National Register of Historic Places. The district is roughly bounded by Calumet Street on the west and south, Stable Street on the north, and North Florida and Isle Royale Streets on the east. This area contains the entire village of Laurium save two areas added in the 1970s.

The vast majority of the structures in Laurium were constructed during the 35 years between 1880 and 1915, and the common architectural styles in the village reflect what was popular at the time.

Over 90% of the structures in the historic district are residential in nature, and most of those are single-family houses. Probably the grandest of these is the Thomas H. Hoatson House (now known as the Laurium Manor Inn), a large Classical Revival style house. The most common houses are more modest in scale and ornamentation, with two-story front-gabled houses of predominantly frame construction being the most common.

Five churches and two schools are spread through the community, and most commercial structures are near the intersection of Hecla and Third Streets; this includes the J. Vivian, Jr. and Company Building, which is separately listed on the National Register. These buildings are often constructed of brick and/or sandstone.

== Geography ==
According to the United States Census Bureau, the village has a total area of 0.65 square miles (1.68 km^{2}), all land.

== Demographics ==
=== 2020 census ===
As of the 2020 census, Laurium had a population of 1,864. The median age was 40.6 years. 24.6% of residents were under the age of 18 and 20.4% of residents were 65 years of age or older. For every 100 females there were 98.5 males, and for every 100 females age 18 and over there were 95.7 males age 18 and over.

100.0% of residents lived in urban areas, while 0.0% lived in rural areas.

There were 800 households in Laurium, of which 27.6% had children under the age of 18 living in them. Of all households, 41.0% were married-couple households, 21.4% were households with a male householder and no spouse or partner present, and 28.3% were households with a female householder and no spouse or partner present. About 34.8% of all households were made up of individuals and 17.5% had someone living alone who was 65 years of age or older.

There were 1,005 housing units, of which 20.4% were vacant. The homeowner vacancy rate was 3.2% and the rental vacancy rate was 9.6%.

Racial composition as of the 2020 census
Race	Number	Percent
White	1,772	95.1%
Black or African American	3	0.2%
American Indian and Alaska Native	9	0.5%
Asian	3	0.2%
Native Hawaiian and Other Pacific Islander	0	0.0%
Some other race	10	0.5%
Two or more races	67	3.6%
Hispanic or Latino (of any race)	22	1.2%

=== 2010 census ===
As of the census of 2010, there were 1,977 people, 814 households, and 491 families residing in the village. The population density was 3,041.5 inhabitants per square mile (1,174.3/km^{2}). There were 1,059 housing units at an average density of 1,629.2 per square mile (629.0/km^{2}). The racial makeup of the village was 96.6% White, 0.7% African American, 0.7% Native American, 0.1% Asian, 0.4% from other races, and 1.5% from two or more races. Hispanic or Latino of any race were 1.2% of the population.

There were 814 households, of which 29.9% had children under the age of 18 living with them, 45.8% were married couples living together, 10.4% had a female householder with no husband present, 4.1% had a male householder with no wife present, and 39.7% were non-families. 35.6% of all households were made up of individuals, and 16.9% had someone living alone who was 65 years of age or older. The average household size was 2.43 and the average family size was 3.19.

The median age in the village was 38.1 years. 27.3% of residents were under the age of 18; 9.2% were between the ages of 18 and 24; 21.2% were from 25 to 44; 27% were from 45 to 64; and 15.4% were 65 years of age or older. The gender makeup of the village was 49.7% male and 50.3% female.

=== 2000 census ===
As of the census of 2000, there were 2,126 people, 897 households, and 540 families residing in the village. The population density was 3,163.7 inhabitants per square mile (1,221.5/km^{2}). There were 1,082 housing units at an average density of 1,610.1 per square mile (621.7/km^{2}). The racial makeup of the village was 98.12% White, 0.24% African American, 0.61% Native American, 0.19% Asian, 0.05% Pacific Islander, 0.19% from other races, and 0.61% from two or more races. Hispanic or Latino of any race were 0.52% of the population. 38.9% were of Finnish, 9.6% German, 9.1% Italian, 7.5% French and 7.2% English ancestry according to Census 2000.

Historical population
Census	Pop.	Note	%±
1890	1,159		—
1900	5,643		386.9%
1910	8,537		51.3%
1920	6,606		−22.6%
1930	4,916		−25.6%
1940	3,929		−20.1%
1950	3,211		−18.3%
1960	3,058		−4.8%
1970	2,868		−6.2%
1980	2,678		−6.6%
1990	2,268		−15.3%
2000	2,126		−6.3%
2010	1,977		−7.0%
2020	1,864		−5.7%
U.S. Decennial Census

There were 897 households, out of which 28.2% had children under the age of 18 living with them, 46.7% were married couples living together, 10.1% had a female householder with no husband present, and 39.7% were non-families. 37.0% of all households were made up of individuals, and 19.5% had someone living alone who was 65 years of age or older. The average household size was 2.36 and the average family size was 3.14.

In the village, the population was spread out, with 26.5% under the age of 18, 7.2% from 18 to 24, 23.9% from 25 to 44, 22.2% from 45 to 64, and 20.1% who were 65 years of age or older. The median age was 40 years. For every 100 females, there were 93.1 males. For every 100 females age 18 and over, there were 88.0 males.

The median income for a household in the village was $30,404, and the median income for a family was $40,556. Males had a median income of $28,571 versus $23,824 for females. The per capita income for the village was $16,686. About 8.8% of families and 12.4% of the population were below the poverty line, including 12.6% of those under age 18 and 14.5% of those age 65 or over.

== Education ==
The Calumet-Laurium-Keweenaw (C-L-K) School District, established in 1867, remains one of the most populous school districts in the area. It serves the two towns named, as well as almost all of Keweenaw County.

== Notable people ==
- George Gipp - University of Notre Dame football star;
- Percy Ross - Philanthropist, newspaper columnist;
- James Quello - FCC Commissioner and broadcast pioneer;
- Philip Ruppe - U.S. Congressman for Michigan’s 11th Congresional District (1967-1979).

== Images ==
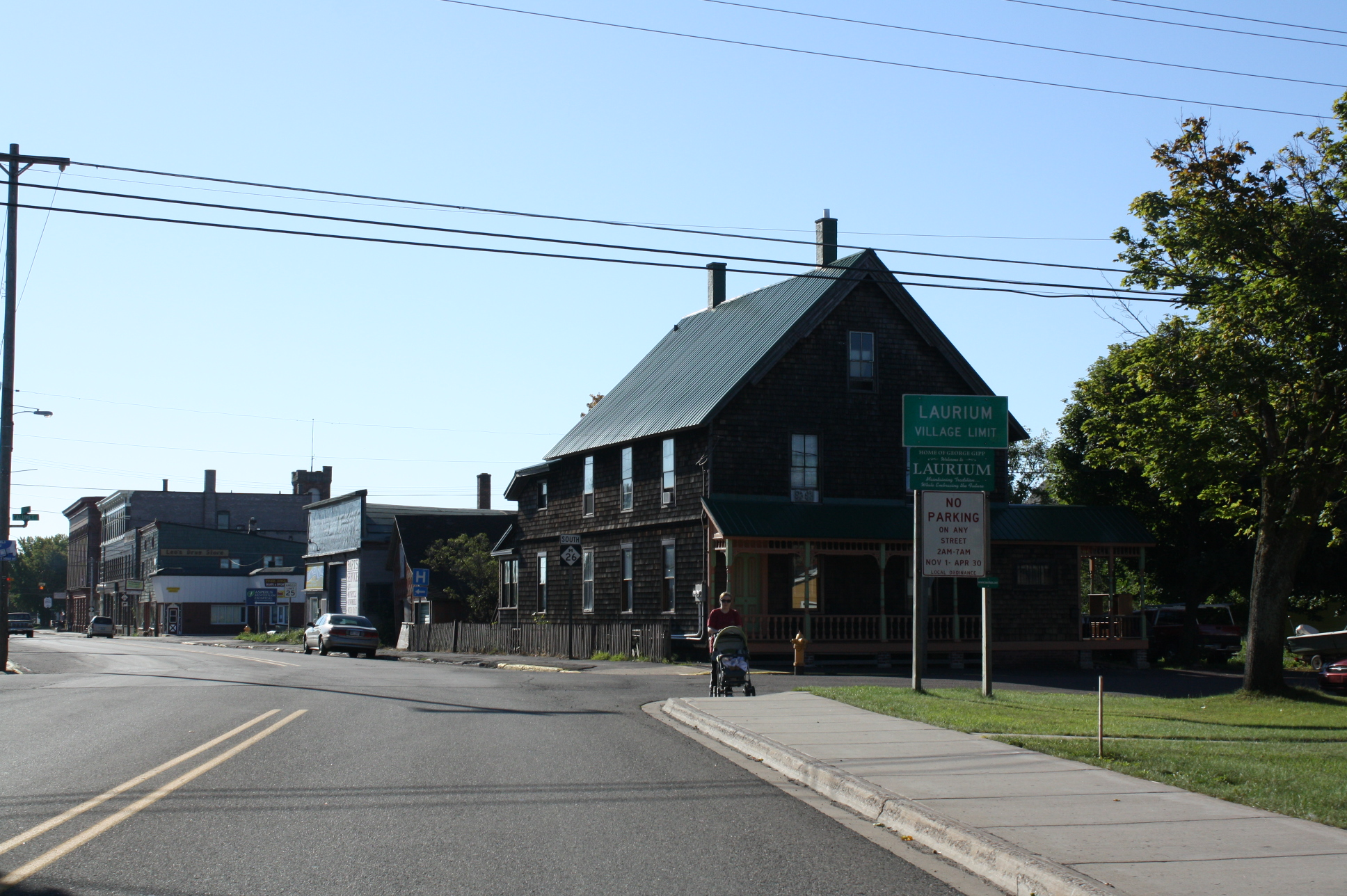
Welcome to Laurium Sign

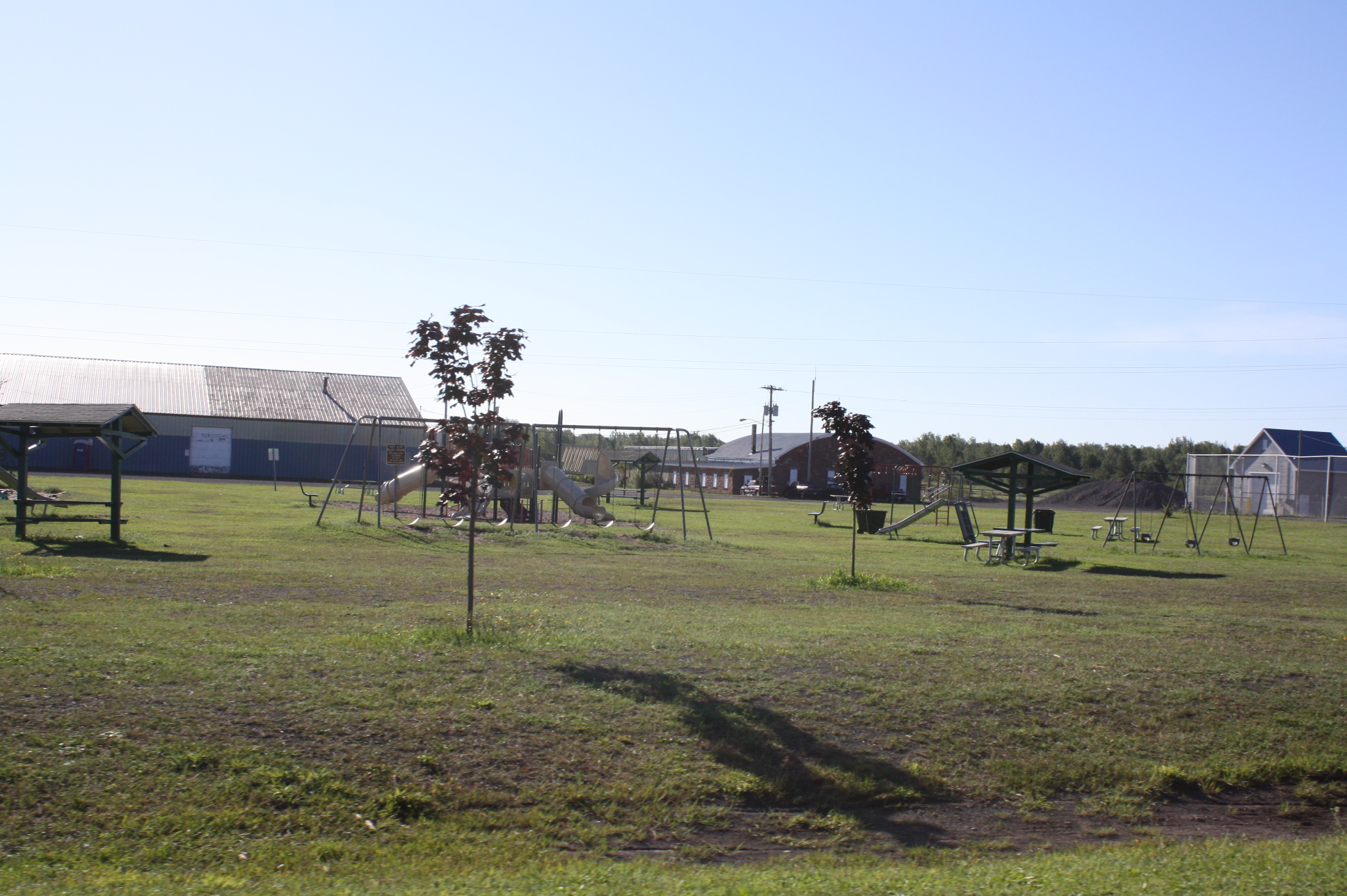
George Gipp Park, known to the locals as the Bicentennial

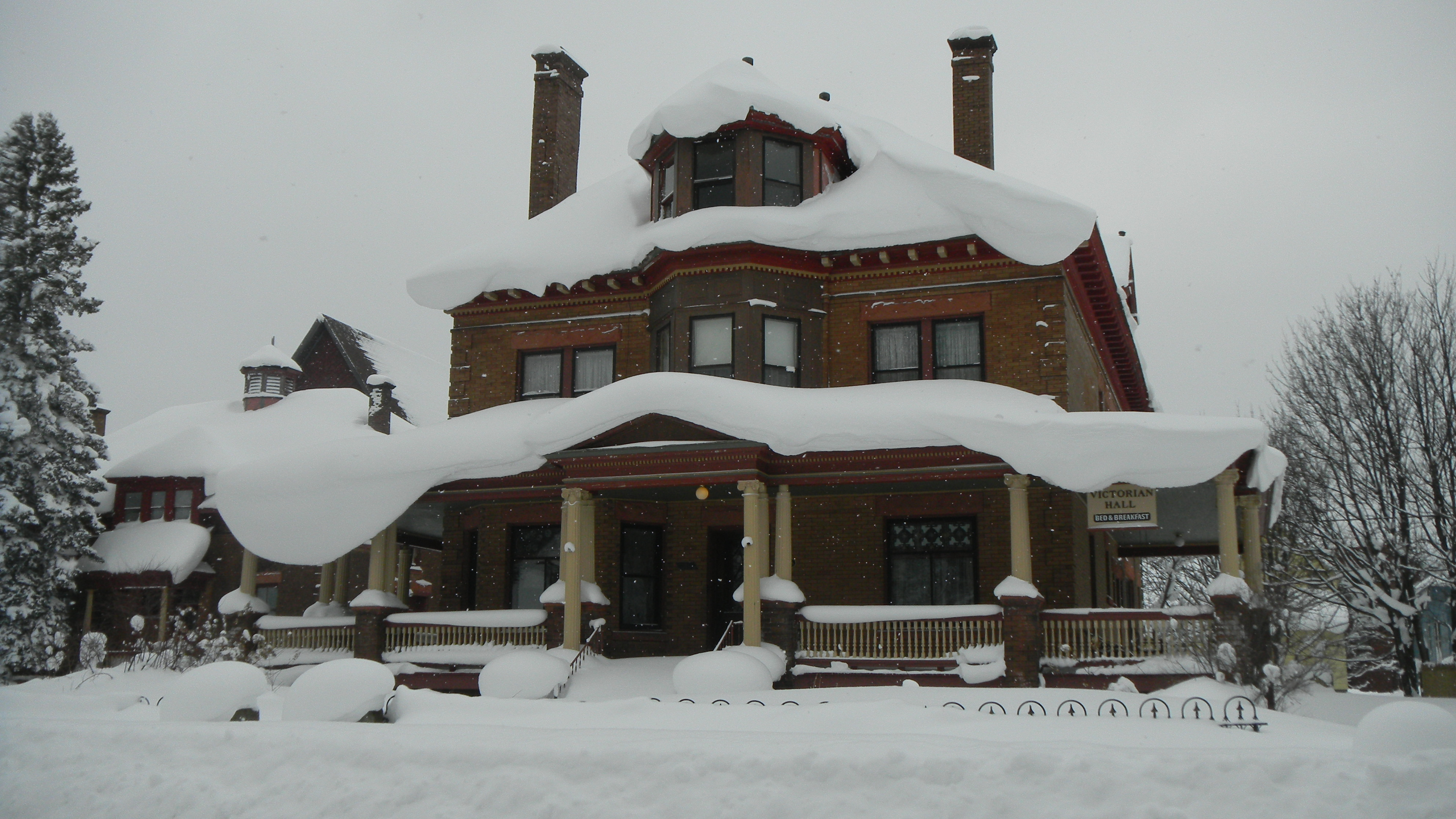
Victorian Hall in winter

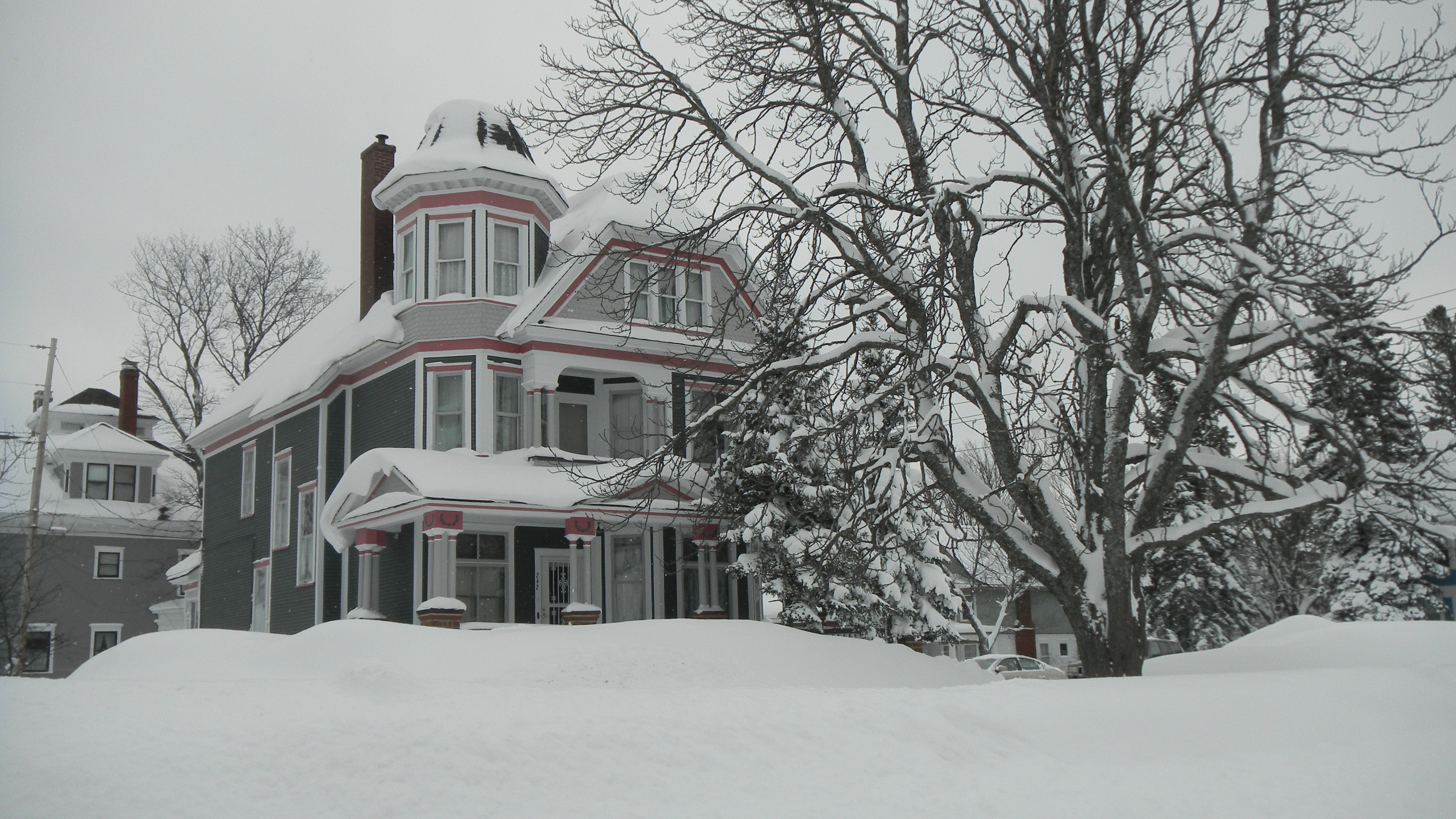
Private residence in winter
