= George Williams (Michigan politician) =

American politician

George Williams was born on 24 September 1869 in Oswestry, which has at various times in history been part of either Wales or Shropshire, England.

Sometime before 1884 he immigrated to Marquette in the Upper Peninsula of the U.S. state of Michigan. He was educated there, and began working on the railways at an early age, eventually becoming a General Agent of the Copper Range Railroad.

Williams was a Republican and was a member of the Michigan Senate from 1915 to 1916 for the 32nd district, which comprises Houghton County, Keweenaw County and Ontonagon County. George died March 31, 1934, in Green Bay, WI. He was buried next to his wife, Salina, in Houghton, MI.
