= Roger Kahn (politician) =

American politician

Member of the Michigan Senate from the 32nd district
- In office January 1, 2007 – December 31, 2014
- Preceded by: Michael Goschka
- Succeeded by: Kenneth Horn

Member of the Michigan House of Representatives from the 94th district
- In office January 1, 2005 – December 31, 2006
- Preceded by: Jim Howell
- Succeeded by: Kenneth Horn

Member of the Saginaw County Board of Commissioners from the 13th District
- In office January 1, 2003 – December 31, 2004
- Preceded by: Jeanine Collison
- Succeeded by: Ann Doyle

Personal details
- Born: January 28, 1945 (age 81) Monroe, Michigan, U.S.
- Party: Republican
- Spouse: Nyla Kahn
- Children: 8
- Education: Delta College; Michigan State University; Wayne State University

Roger Kahn (born January 28, 1945) is a Republican politician who represented District 32 of the Michigan Senate, which consisted of Saginaw and Gratiot counties. He served as the chairman of the Committee on Appropriations.

== Biography ==
A medical doctor, Roger served as a cardiologist for many years, he also served as a member of the Saginaw County Board of Commissioners. Kahn was elected in 2004 to his only term as State Representative, in 2006 he was elected to his first term in the Michigan State Senate.

== Michigan Quality Community Care Council ==
In October 2011, Michigan Capitol Reporter, part of the politically right-wing Mackinac Center for Public Policy, reported that Kahn was promoting the position of the Service Employees International Union and seeking to preserve a program in which union dues were being collected from home care providers, including family members, and diverted to SEIU through the Michigan Quality Community Care Council, which the Michigan Legislature had previously defunded.

In response, Kahn stated that "The Michigan Quality Community Care Council saves taxpayers millions of dollars each year and helps seniors and people with disabilities remain healthy, independent and in their own homes. It provides in-depth training to home healthcare providers and performs thorough background checks to promote safety, accountability and transparency. That's why I've supported this important program for years and continue to do so."
