= List of special elections to the Michigan Senate =

The following is a list of special elections for the Michigan Senate.

== List of special elections ==
Date	Dist.	Incumbent	Party	Winner	Party	Cause
March 6–7, 1837	1st	Conrad Ten Eyck	Dem.	Benjamin B. Kercheval	Dem.	Resigned
c. December 1841–January 1842	5th	John S. Barry	Dem.	George R. Redfield	Dem.	Resigned
November 1847	6th	Elijah B. Witherbee	Whig	Alvin N. Hart	Dem.	Death
1861	16th	Joseph R. Williams	Rep.	Henry H. Riley	Dem.	Death
1872	4th	Gilbert Hatheway	Rep.	Seymour Brownell	Dem.	Death
February 23, 1874	8th	Philip H. Emerson	Rep.	William F. Hewitt	Dem.	Resigned
February 23, 1874	9th	William R. Stoddard	Rep.	John P. Cook	Dem.	Death
February 23, 1874	24th	Harrison H. Wheeler	Rep.	John D. Lewis	Rep.	Resigned
April 1881	20th	John T. Rich	Rep.	William W. Andrus	Rep.	Resigned
April 25–26, 1881	15th	Lewis Durkee	Rep.	David R. Cook	Rep.	Death
April 1, 1895	10th	John W. Watts	Rep.	Charles H. Smith	Rep.	Death
January 30, 1911	21st	Edwin G. Fox	Rep.	John Conley	Dem.	Death
April 6, 1925	9th	James Henry	Rep.	Joseph E. Watson	Rep.	Death
January 26, 1931	2nd	Cass J. Jankowski	Rep.	George G. Sadowski	Dem.	Death
April 3, 1939	1st	James A. Murphy	Dem.	Carl W. Bischoff	Dem.	Death
April 2, 1945	9th	Warren G. Hooper	Rep.	Robert J. Hamilton	Rep.	Murdered
April 2, 1945	22nd	Chester M. Howell	Rep.	William W. Lee	Rep.	Resigned
November 6, 1945	6th	Carl F. DeLano	Rep.	John W. Fletcher	Rep.	Resigned
April 2, 1951	23rd	Frank E. McKee	Rep.	Clyde H. Geerlings	Rep.	Death
January 5, 1954	27th	Felix H. H. Flynn	Rep.	John Minnema	Rep.	Death
May 9, 1955	2nd	Anthony J. Wilkowski (Note: Anthony J. Wilkowski was elected in the 1954 general election, but was denied his seat by a Michigan Supreme Court ruling, due to a 1936 conviction for election recount fraud.)	Dem.	Stanley F. Rozycki	Dem.	Denied seat
April 1, 1957	14th	Harry F. Hittle	Rep.	Paul C. Younger	Rep.	Death
December 11, 1961	28th	Charles T. Prescott	Rep.	Harold B. Hughes	Rep.	Death
April 2, 1962	30th	William E. Miron	Dem.	Kent T. Lundgren	Rep.	Death
April 5, 1965	14th	Paul M. Chandler (Note: Paul M. Chandler died before taking office.)	Rep.	Farrell E. Roberts	Rep.	Death
February 19, 1968	23rd	Harold Volkema	Rep.	Gary Byker	Rep.	Death
November 5, 1968 (Note: Special election held alongside a general election.)	28th	Frank D. Beadle	Rep.	Alvin J. DeGrow	Rep.	Resigned
March 19, 1974	2nd	Charles N. Youngblood Jr.	Dem.	John C. Hertel	Dem.	Resigned
March 19, 1974	4th	Coleman A. Young	Dem.	David S. Holmes Jr.	Dem.	Resigned
June 25, 1974	21st	Anthony Stamm	Rep.	Jack Welborn	Rep.	Death
November 5, 1974	8th	Michael J. O'Brien	Dem.	Michael J. O'Brien Jr.	Dem.	Death
January 13, 1976	11th	John McCauley	Dem.	James R. DeSana	Dem.	Death
March 23, 1977	14th	Carl Pursell	Rep.	R. Robert Geake	Rep.	Resigned
March 23, 1977	29th	Dale Kildee	Dem.	Harold J. Scott	Dem.	Resigned
April 19, 1977	27th	John T. Bowman	Dem.	Art Miller Jr.	Dem.	Resigned
September 6, 1978	5th	Arthur Cartwright	Dem.	Jackie Vaughn III	Dem.	Resigned
March 23, 1982	16th	Bill Huffman	Dem.	Dana F. Wilson	Dem.	Resigned
January 31, 1984	8th	Philip Mastin	Dem.	Rudy J. Nichols	Rep.	Recalled
January 31, 1984	9th	David M. Serotkin	Dem.	Kirby Holmes	Rep.	Recalled
March 26, 1985	32nd	Paul B. Henry	Rep.	Vern Ehlers	Rep.	Resigned
August 13, 1985	13th	Robert A. Welborn	Rep.	Jack Welborn	Rep.	Death
March 15, 1988	2nd	Basil W. Brown	Dem.	Virgil C. Smith	Dem.	Resigned
November 6, 1990	38th	Joseph Mack	Dem.	Don Koivisto	Dem.	Resigned
June 18, 1991	16th	Doug Cruce	Rep.	Mike Bouchard	Rep.	Resigned
March 15, 1993	19th	Nick Smith	Rep.	Philip E. Hoffman	Rep.	Resigned
March 15, 1993	34th	James Barcia	Dem.	Joel Gougeon	Rep.	Resigned
April 26, 1994	32nd	Vern Ehlers	Rep.	Glenn Steil Sr.	Rep.	Resigned
November 8, 1994	4th	David S. Holmes Jr.	Dem.	Patricia Holmes	Dem.	Death
June 4, 1996	15th	David M. Honigman	Rep.	Bill Bullard Jr.	Rep.	Resigned
November 25, 1997	12th	Doug Carl	Rep.	David Jaye	Rep.	Death
November 3, 1998	3rd	Henry Stallings II	Dem.	Raymond M. Murphy	Dem.	Resigned
March 16, 1999	13th	Mike Bouchard	Rep.	Shirley Johnson	Rep.	Resigned
March 20, 2001	2nd	Virgil C. Smith	Rep.	Martha G. Scott	Dem.	Resigned
March 20, 2001	26th	Mike Rogers	Rep.	Valde Garcia	Rep.	Resigned
November 6, 2001	12th	David Jaye	Rep.	Alan Sanborn	Rep.	Expelled
March 14, 2006	23rd	Virgil Bernero	Dem.	Gretchen Whitmer	Dem.	Resigned
November 3, 2009	19th	Mark Schauer	Dem.	Mike Nofs	Rep.	Resigned
May 7, 2013	27th	John J. Gleason	Dem.	Jim Ananich	Dem.	Resigned
November 8, 2016	4th	Virgil Smith Jr.	Dem.	Ian Conyers	Dem.	Resigned
November 6, 2018	2nd	Bert Johnson	Dem.	Adam Hollier	Dem.	Resigned
November 2, 2021	8th	Peter Lucido	Rep.	Doug Wozniak	Rep.	Resigned
November 2, 2021	28th	Peter MacGregor	Rep.	Mark Huizenga	Rep.	Resigned
May 5, 2026	35th	Kristen McDonald Rivet	Dem.	Chedrick Greene	Dem.	Resigned

== See also ==
- List of special elections to the Michigan House of Representatives
