= Kevin Green (politician) =

American politician

Member of the Michigan House of Representatives from the 77th district
- In office January 1, 2005 – January 1, 2011
- Preceded by: Joanne Voorhees
- Succeeded by: Thomas Hooker

Personal details
- Born: June 18, 1970 (age 56)
- Party: Republican
- Education: Central Michigan University; Grand Valley State University

Kevin J. Green (born June 18, 1970) is a Michigan politician.

== Early life and education ==
Kevin Green was born on June 18, 1970, to parents Joe and Colleen Green. He grew up in Wakefield, Michigan, and earned a bachelor's degree in business administration from Central Michigan University in 1992. He also earned a master's degree in public administration from Grand Valley State University. In 1994, Green interned for the city manager of Cedar Springs, Michigan.

== Career ==
Green worked as a business manager for Toys "R" Us. In 1995, Green became the real estate and community relations manager of the Western Michigan region for Viacom Outdoor. Green served as chair of the Wyoming-Kentwood Area Chamber of Commerce and as a member on the board of the Grand Rapids Chamber of Commerce.

On November 2, 1999, Green was elected to serve on the Wyoming city council as an at-large member. He became the youngest elected official in Wyoming, Michigan history. He served on the city council until 2004. On November 2, 2004, Green was elected to the Michigan House of Representatives, where he represented the 77th district. Green was sworn in on January 15, 2005.

On October 29, 2008, Green was arrested for drunk driving. The Saginaw County Sheriff's Department report says that Green was found passed out in a parked, running car, covered in vomit and smelling of alcohol in Saginaw Township. Green initially said that he was pulled over by the police. He later claimed that he was not passed out, but instead had fallen asleep. Green repeatedly refused to take a breathalyzer test. He later took the breathalyzer test at the jail. His blood alcohol level was 0.13%. The legal limit in Michigan is 0.08%. News of his arrest was spread by November 5, 2008, the day after his re-election to the state house. Initially, Green was charged with drunk driving, a conviction which had the potential to land Green in jail. On November 25, Green pleaded guilty to driving while impaired, a lesser charge which only involves fines, the adding of driver's license points, and a license restriction. Green agreed to step down from two committees for the rest of the year: the Health Policy Committee and the Banking & Financial Services Committee. Green retained his position on the Senior Health, Security and Retirement Committee and as state house whip. Green served the remainder of his term in the state house until January 1, 2011. He was then term limited.

In 2014, Green ran for the Michigan Senate seat representing the 28th district. While Green and Peter MacGregor shared many political views, such as standing against same-sex marriage, abortion, and increasing the minimum wage, MacGregor's primary campaign managed to get significantly more donations from political action committees. On August 5, Green was defeated by MacGregor, who went on to win the general election.

In 2016, Green ran to be the supervisor of Algoma Township. On August 2, in the Republican primary, Green defeated incumbent supervisor, Nancy Clary. In the general election, he was unopposed. Green was re-elected as supervisor unopposed in 2020 and 2024.

Green ran for the state senate seat representing the 28th district again in the 2021 special election. The seat was made vacant when MacGregor left the office after being elected Kent County treasurer. During his campaign, Green advocated for a "forensic audit" of the 2020 election. The primary took place on August 3. He faced challengers Tommy Brann and Mark Huizenga. He was ultimately defeated by Huizenga, coming in second place. On August 18, Green petitioned for a recount in the primary election. He cited two irregularities which made him question the integrity of the election: Green won more in-person votes, but lost due to mail-in support for Huizenga, and he claimed that there were an unspecified number of people who voted in the primary who do not normally vote in primaries.

== Personal life ==
Green married Chele. They had two children, Elliot and Meadow. They had another child, Skylar Anne Green, who died on September 6, 2007. Skylar was stillborn.
