= Michigan's 28th Senate district =

American legislative district

Michigan's 28th State Senate district
Senator
Sam Singh; D–East Lansing
- Demographics: 80.7% White; 3.6% Black; 5.6% Hispanic; 4.8% Asian; 0.2% Native American; 0.5% Other; 4.7% Multiracial
- Population (2024): 260,707

Michigan's 28th Senate district is one of 38 districts in the Michigan Senate. The 28th district was created by the 1850 Michigan Constitution, as the 1835 constitution only permitted a maximum of eight senate districts. It has been represented by Democratic Sam Singh since 2023, succeeding Republican Mark Huizenga.

== Geography ==
District 28 encompasses parts of Clinton, Ingham, and Shiawassee counties.

=== 2011 Apportionment Plan ===
District 28, as dictated by the 2011 Apportionment Plan, covered the suburbs of Grand Rapids in Kent County, including the communities of Wyoming, Walker, Grandville, Rockford, Cedar Springs, Plainfield Township, Byron Township, Alpine Township, Algoma Township, Cannon Township, and Sparta Township.

The district was split between Michigan's 2nd and 3rd congressional districts, and overlapped with the 73rd, 74th, 77th, and 86th districts of the Michigan House of Representatives.

== List of senators ==
Senator	Party	Dates	Residence	Notes
Enos Goodrich	Democratic	1853–1854	Goodrich	
Reuben Goodrich	Republican	1855–1856	Goodrich	
Thomas Whitney	Republican	1857–1858	East Saginaw	
James M. Birney	Republican	1859–1860	Bay City	
John N. Ingersoll	Republican	1861–1862	Owosso	
Westbrook Divine	Republican	1863–1866	Greenville	
Hampton Rich	Republican	1867–1870	Ionia	
John C. Dexter	Republican	1871–1872	Ionia	
Moreau S. Crosby	Republican	1873–1874	Grand Rapids	
Lyman Murray	Republican	1875–1876	Grand Rapids	
Charles H. Morse	Republican	1877–1878	New Haven Center	
James W. Cochrane	Republican	1879–1880	Midland	
Giles W. Brown	Republican	1881–1882	Ithaca	
Archibald Buttars	Republican	1883–1884	Charlevoix	
William H. Francis	Republican	1885–1886	Frankfort	
J. Wight Giddings	Republican	1887–1890	Cadillac	
A. Oren Wheeler	Republican	1891–1892	Manistee	
Charles Sumner Pierce	Republican	1893–1894	Oscoda	
George A. Prescott	Republican	1895–1898	Tawas City	
Alvah G. Smith	Republican	1899–1900	Lake City	
Alfred J. Doherty	Republican	1901–1906	Clare	
Augustus C. Carton	Republican	1907–1908	East Tawas	
Eugene Foster	Republican	1909–1912	Gladwin	
Louis L. Kelley	Republican	1913–1916	Farwell	
Duncan McRae	Republican	1917–1922	Harrisville	Lived in Greenbush until around 1919.
Horatio S. Karcher	Republican	1923–1928	Rose City	
Tony Achard	Republican	1929–1930	Clare	
Ben Carpenter	Republican	1931–1936	Harrison	
Miles M. Callaghan	Republican	1937–1940	Reed City	
Ben Carpenter	Republican	1941–1946	Harrison	
Charles T. Prescott	Republican	1947–1961	Prescott	Died in office.
Harold B. Hughes	Republican	1961–1964	Clare	
Frank D. Beadle	Republican	1965–1968	St. Clair	Resigned.
Alvin J. DeGrow	Republican	1968–1982	Pigeon	
Dan DeGrow	Republican	1983–1994	Port Huron	
John D. Cherry	Democratic	1995–2002	Clio	
Ken Sikkema	Republican	2003–2006	Grandville	
Mark Jansen	Republican	2007–2014	Grand Rapids	
Peter MacGregor	Republican	2015–2020	Rockford	Resigned after elected Kent County treasurer.
Mark Huizenga	Republican	2021–2022	Walker	
Sam Singh	Democratic	2023–present	East Lansing	

== Recent election results ==
=== 2020s ===
2026 Michigan Senate election
Primary election
Party	Candidate	Votes	%
General election
Democratic	Rashida Harrison	71,701	56.84
Republican	Julie L. DeRose	51,058	40.48
Working Class	Wes Peterson	1,878	1.49
Libertarian	Brandon Crabill	1,501	1.19
Total votes		126,138	100
Democratic hold			

2022 Michigan Senate election, District 28
Primary election
Party	Candidate	Votes	%
Democratic	Sam Singh	25,651	89.4
Democratic	Muhammad Salman Rais	3,041	10.6
Total votes		28,692	100
Republican	Daylen W. Howard	13,540	58.4
Republican	Madhu Anderson	9,646	41.6
Total votes		23,186	100
General election
Democratic	Sam Singh	65,537	55.8
Republican	Daylen W. Howard	49,272	42.0
Constitution	Matthew J. Shepard	2,635	2.2
Total votes		117,444	100
Democratic gain from Republican			

=== 2021 ===
2021 Michigan Senate special election, District 28
Primary election
Party	Candidate	Votes	%
Democratic	Keith Courtade	6,413	60.9
Democratic	Gidget Groendyk	4,101	39.0
Write-in		10	0.1
Total votes		10,524	100.0
Republican	Mark Huizenga	9,531	33.8
Republican	Kevin Green	9,357	33.2
Republican	Tommy Brann	9,272	32.9
Write-in		20	0.1
Total votes		28,180	100.0
General election
Republican	Mark Huizenga	25,735	60.6
Democratic	Keith Courtade	15,683	36.9
Libertarian	Alexander Avery	611	1.4
Constitution	Theodore Gerrard	420	1.0
Write-in		38	0.1
Total votes		42,487	100.0

=== 2018 ===
2018 Michigan Senate election, District 28
Primary election
Party	Candidate	Votes	%
Democratic	Craig Beach	7,689	41.4
Democratic	Gidget Groendyk	6,444	34.7
Democratic	Ryan Jeanette	4,426	23.8
Total votes		18,599	100
General election
Republican	Peter MacGregor (incumbent)	68,749	58.4
Democratic	Craig Beach	45,937	39.0
Libertarian	Nathan Hewer	3,059	2.6
Total votes		117,745	100
Republican hold			

=== 2014 ===
2014 Michigan Senate election, District 28
Primary election
Party	Candidate	Votes	%
Republican	Peter MacGregor	18,397	67.8
Republican	Kevin Green	8,733	32.2
Total votes		27,130	100
General election
Republican	Peter MacGregor	53,221	66.1
Democratic	Deb Havens	25,131	31.2
U.S. Taxpayers'	Ted Gerrard	2,115	2.6
Total votes		80,467	100
Republican hold			

=== Federal and statewide results ===
Year	Office	Results
2020	President	Trump 55.6 – 42.3%
2018	Senate	James 56.8 – 40.8%
2018	Governor	Schuette 54.6 – 42.1%
2016	President	Trump 57.8 – 35.7%
2014	Senate	Land 57.3 – 38.1%
2014	Governor	Snyder 66.7 – 28.9%
2012	President	Romney 60.5 – 38.5%
2012	Senate	Hoekstra 56.0 – 40.7%

== Historical district boundaries ==
Map	Description	Apportionment Plan	Notes
	Huron County; St. Clair County (part); Berlin Township; Brockway Township; Burtchville Township; China Township; Clay Township; Clyde Township; Columbus Township; Cottrellville Township; East China Township; Emmett Township; Fort Gratiot Township; Grant Township; Greenwood Township; Kenockee Township; Kimball Township; Lynn Township; Marine City; Marysville; Mussey Township; Port Huron; Port Huron Township; Riley Township; St. Clair; St. Clair Township; Wales Township; Yale; Sanilac County; Tuscola County (part); Akron Township; Almer Township; Columbia Township; Dayton Township; Elkland Township; Ellington Township; Elmwood Township; Fairgrove Township; Fremont Township; Gilford Township; Indianfields Township; Juniata Township; Kingston Township; Koylton Township; Millington Township; Novesta Township; Vassar; Vassar Township; Watertown Township; Wells Township; Wisner Township	1964 Apportionment Plan	
	Huron County; Lapeer County (part); Excluding; Almont Township; Macomb County (part); Memphis (part); Sanilac County; St. Clair County (part); Brockway Township; Burtchville Township; Clyde Township; Emmett Township; Fort Gratiot Township; Grant Township; Greenwood Township; Kenockee Township; Kimball Township; Lynn Township; Memphis (part); Mussey Township; Port Huron; Riley Township; Yale; Tuscola County	1972 Apportionment Plan	
	Lapeer County; Sanilac County; St. Clair County	1982 Apportionment Plan	
	Genesee County (part); Atlas Township; Burton; Clio; Davison; Davison Township; Forest Township; Genesee Township; Grand Blanc; Grand Blanc Township; Montrose; Montrose Township; Mount Morris; Mount Morris Township; Richfield Township; Thetford Township; Vienna Township; Oakland County (part); Brandon Township; Groveland Township; Holly Township; Oxford Township; Rose Township	1992 Apportionment Plan	
	Kent County (part); Ada Township; Algoma Township; Alpine Township; Bowne Township; Byron Township; Caledonia Township; Cannon Township; Cedar Springs; Courtland Township; East Grand Rapids; Grand Rapids Township; Nelson Township; Oakfield Township; Plainfield Township; Rockford; Solon Township; Spencer Township; Tyrone Township; Walker; Wyoming	2001 Apportionment Plan	
	Kent County (part); Algoma Township; Alpine Township; Byron Township; Cannon Township; Cedar Springs; Courtland Township; Grandville; Grattan Township; Nelson Township; Oakfield Township; Plainfield Township; Rockford; Solon Township; Sparta Township; Spencer Township; Tyrone Township; Vergennes Township; Walker; Wyoming	2011 Apportionment Plan	
