= 2006 Michigan Senate election =

2006 Michigan Senate elections
- November 7, 2006

38 seats in the Michigan Senate 20 seats needed for a majority
	Majority party	Minority party
Leader	Ken Sikkema	Robert L. Emerson
Party	Republican	Democratic
Leader since	January 1, 2003	2003
Leader's seat	28th–Wyoming	27th–Flint
Seats before	22	16
Seats after	21	17
Seat change	▼1	▲1
Popular vote	1,619,980	1,967,404
Percentage	44.63%	54.20%
- Results: Democratic gain Republican hold Democratic hold
Majority Leader before election
Ken Sikkema
Republican
Elected Majority Leader
Mike Bishop
Republican

The 2006 Michigan Senate elections took place on November 7, 2006, with partisan primaries to select the parties' candidates in the various districts on August 6, 2006.

== Predictions ==
Source	Ranking	As of
Rothenberg	Lean R	November 4, 2006

== Results ==
=== Districts 1-19 ===
1st District (Wayne (south and east Detroit, Grosse Pointe Park))
Party	Candidate	Votes	%
Democratic	Hansen Clarke (incumbent)	52,175	95.5
Republican	Cynthia Cassell	2,456	4.5
Total votes		54,631	100.0
Democratic hold			

2nd District (Wayne (Grosse Pointe Park, Grosse Pointe, Grosse Pointe Farms, Grosse Pointe Township))
Party	Candidate	Votes	%
Democratic	Martha Scott (incumbent)	47,223	73.41
Republican	Michael Hoehn	17,104	26.59
Total votes		64,327	100.0
Democratic hold			

3rd District (Wayne (west Detroit; excluding northwest, southwest and far east Dearborn; Melvindale; River Rouge))
Party	Candidate	Votes	%
Democratic	Irma Clark-Coleman (incumbent)	57,746	82.39
Republican	Paul Sophiea	12,345	17.61
Total votes		70,091	100.0
Democratic hold			

4th District (Wayne (northwest and west Detroit, northeast Dearborn Heights))
Party	Candidate	Votes	%
Democratic	Buzz Thomas (incumbent)	54,713	96.09
Republican	Karen Mastney Fobbs	2,225	3.91
Total votes		56,938	100.0
Democratic hold			

5th District (Wayne (excluding northeast and southeast Dearborn Heights, excluding east Dearborn, Inkster))
Party	Candidate	Votes	%
Democratic	Tupac Hunter	55,674	85.22
Republican	David Malhalab	8,153	12.48
Green	James Wolbrink	1,504	2.3
Total votes		65,331	100.0
Democratic hold			

6th District (Wayne (Livonia, Redford Township, Westland, Garden City))
Party	Candidate	Votes	%
Democratic	Glenn Anderson	52,492	52.45
Republican	Laura M. Toy (incumbent)	47,590	47.55
Total votes		100,082	100.0
Democratic gain from Republican			

7th District (Wayne (Northville-excluding portion outside county, Northville Township, Plymouth, Canton Township, Van Buren Township, Belleville, Sumpter Township, Huron Township, Brownstown Township, Flat Rock, Woodhaven, Trenton, Grosse Ile Township, Gibraltar, Rockwood))
Party	Candidate	Votes	%
Republican	Bruce Patterson (incumbent)	59,638	51.51
Democratic	Mark Slavens	56,148	48.49
Total votes		115,786	100.0
Republican hold			

8th District (Wayne (Wayne, Romulus, Taylor, Allen Park, Melvindale, Lincoln Park, Ecorse, Southgate, Wyandotte, Riverview))
Party	Candidate	Votes	%
Democratic	Raymond Basham (incumbent)	58,487	70.97
Republican	Fred Kalsic	21,723	26.36
Libertarian	Loel Gnadt	2,196	2.66
Total votes		82,406	100.0
Democratic hold			

9th District (Macomb (Fraser, Warren, Center Line, Eastpointe, St. Clair Shores))
Party	Candidate	Votes	%
Democratic	Dennis Olshove (incumbent)	60,775	66.4
Republican	Jeremy Nielson	27,297	29.82
Libertarian	James Allison	2,159	2.36
Green	Richard Kuszmar	1,300	1.42
Total votes		91,531	100.0
Democratic hold			

10th District (Macomb (Sterling Heights, Utica, Clinton Township, Roseville))
Party	Candidate	Votes	%
Democratic	Michael Switalski (incumbent)	62,737	65.76
Republican	John Horton	30,065	31.52
Libertarian	John Bonnell	2,596	2.72
Total votes		95,398	100.0
Democratic hold			

11th District (Macomb (all municipalities north of [and excluding] Utica, Sterling Heights and Clinton Township; Harrison Township; Mount Clemens))
Party	Candidate	Votes	%
Republican	Alan Sanborn (incumbent)	65,541	59.19
Democratic	Kenneth Jenkins	42,278	38.18
Libertarian	Lauren Zemens	2,903	2.62
Total votes		110,722	100.0
Republican hold			

12th District (Oakland (Oxford Township, Addison Township, Independence Township, Clarkston, Orion Township, Oakland Township, Lake Angelus, Rochester, Rochester Hills, Auburn Hills, Pontiac, Sylvan Lake, Keego Harbor))
Party	Candidate	Votes	%
Republican	Mike Bishop (incumbent)	59,619	56.22
Democratic	Joseph Barrera	43,365	40.89
Libertarian	Brian Kelly	3,057	2.88
Total votes		106,041	100.0
Republican hold			

13th District (Oakland (Troy, Bloomfield Hills, Bloomfield Township, Clawson, Royal Oak, Madison Heights, Berkley))
Party	Candidate	Votes	%
Republican	John Pappageorge (incumbent)	57,204	48.97
Democratic	Andy Levin	56,484	48.35
Green	Kyle McBee	3,129	2.68
Total votes		116,817	100.0
Republican hold			

14th District (Oakland (Farmington Hills, Farmington, Southfield Township, Lathrup Village, Southfield, Oak Park, Oak Park, Huntington Woods, Pleasant Ridge, Hazel Park, Ferndale, Royal Oak Township))
Party	Candidate	Votes	%
Democratic	Gilda Jacobs (incumbent)	78,346	72.52
Republican	Tara Bellingar	26,569	24.59
Green	William Opalicky	1,312	1.21
Total votes		106,227	100.0
Democratic hold			

15th District (Oakland (Holly Township, Rose Township, Highland Township, White Lake Township, Milford Township, Commerce Township, Walled Lake, West Bloomfield Township, Orchard Lake, Wixom, Lyon Township, South Lyon, Novi, Novi Township, Northville-excluding portion outside county))
Party	Candidate	Votes	%
Republican	Nancy Cassis (incumbent)	67,068	57.7
Democratic	Ray Raczkowski	46,063	39.63
Libertarian	Nathan Allen	3,110	2.68
Total votes		116,241	100.0
Republican hold			

16th District (St. Joseph, Branch, Hillsdale, Lenawee)
Party	Candidate	Votes	%
Republican	Cameron Brown (incumbent)	52,664	65.37
Democratic	Timothy Christner	27,894	34.63
Total votes		80,558	100.0
Republican hold			

17th District (Jackson (Grass Lake Township, Leoni Township, Norvell Township, Summit Township), Monroe, Washtenaw (Bridgewater Township, Lodi Township, Manchester Township, most of Pittsfield Township, most of Milan, Saline, Saline Township, York Township))
Party	Candidate	Votes	%
Republican	Randy Richardville	52,113	53.42
Democratic	Bob Schockman	45,442	46.58
Total votes		97,555	100.0
Republican hold			

18th District (Washtenaw (Ann Arbor, Ann Arbor Township, Augusta Township, Dexter Township, Freedom Township, Lima Township, Lyndon Township, Northfield Township, small part of Pittsfield Township, Salem Township, Scio Township, Sharon Township, Superior Township, Sylvan Township, Webster Township, Ypsilanti, Ypsilanti Township))
Party	Candidate	Votes	%
Democratic	Liz Brater (incumbent)	72,765	71.45
Republican	John Kopinski	29,074	28.55
Total votes		101,839	100.0
Democratic hold			

19th District (Calhoun, Jackson (excluding Summit Township, Leoni Township, Grass Lake Township, Norvell Township))
Party	Candidate	Votes	%
Democratic	Mark Schauer (incumbent)	50,602	61.2
Republican	Elizabeth Fulton	32,079	38.8
Total votes		82,681	100.0
Democratic hold			

=== Districts 20-38 ===
20th District (Kalamazoo, Van Buren (Antwerp Township, Paw Paw Township))
Party	Candidate	Votes	%
Republican	Tom George (incumbent)	51,554	51.6
Democratic	Alexander Lipsey	48,352	48.4
Total votes		99,906	100.0
Republican hold			

21st District (Berrien, Cass, Van Buren (excluding Paw Paw Township, Antwerp Township))
Party	Candidate	Votes	%
Republican	Ron Jelinek (incumbent)	50,182	58.18
Democratic	Valerie Janowski	36,077	41.82
Total votes		86,259	100.0
Republican hold			

22nd District (Ingham (Bunker Hill Township, Leslie, Leslie Township, Mason, Stockbridge Township, Vevay Township), Livingston, Shiawassee)
Party	Candidate	Votes	%
Republican	Valde Garcia (incumbent)	65,792	59.07
Democratic	Donna Anderson	43,423	38.99
Constitution	Michael Nikitin	2,159	1.94
Total votes		111,374	100.0
Republican hold			

23rd District (Ingham (Alaiedon Township, Aurelius Township, Delhi Charter Township, East Lansing—excluding portion outside county, Lansing—excluding portion outside county, Leroy Township, Locke Township, Meridian Township, Onondaga Township, Wheatfield Township, White Oak Township, Williamston, Williamston Township))
Party	Candidate	Votes	%
Democratic	Gretchen Whitmer (incumbent)	64,393	100
Total votes		64,393	100.0
Democratic hold			

24th District (Allegan, Barry, Eaton)
Party	Candidate	Votes	%
Republican	Patricia Birkholz (incumbent)	64,540	58.15
Democratic	Suzzette Royston	46,446	41.85
Total votes		110,986	100.0
Republican hold			

25th District (Lapeer, St. Clair)
Party	Candidate	Votes	%
Republican	Jud Gilbert (incumbent)	49,266	51.49
Democratic	Gary Orr	43,965	45.95
Constitution	Howard Shepherd	2,456	2.57
Total votes		95,687	100.0
Republican hold			

26th District (Genesee (Atlas Township, Burton, Clio, Davison, Davison Township, Forest Township, Grand Blanc, Grand Blanc Township, Mount Morris, Mount Morris Township, Richfield Township, Thetford Township, Vienna Township), Oakland (Brandon Township, Groveland Township, Springfield Township, Waterford Township))
Party	Candidate	Votes	%
Democratic	Deborah Cherry (incumbent)	65,711	61.33
Republican	Brian Seiferlein	41,439	38.67
Total votes		107,150	100.0
Democratic hold			

27th District (Genesee (Argentine Township, Clayton Township, Fenton, Fenton Township, Flint, Flint Township, Flushing, Flushing Township, Gaines Township, Genesee Township, Linden, Montrose Township, Mundy Township, Swartz Creek))
Party	Candidate	Votes	%
Democratic	John Gleason	71,385	75.79
Republican	Bob Longlois	22,797	24.21
Total votes		94,182	100.0
Democratic hold			

28th District (Kent (Ada Township, Algoma Township, Alpine Township, Bowne Township, Byron Township, Caledonia Township, Cannon Township, Cedar Springs, Courtland Township, East Grand Rapids, Gaines Township, Grand Rapids Township, Nelson Township, Oakfield Township, Plainfield Township, Rockford, Solon Township, Spencer Township, Tyrone Township, Walker, Wyoming))
Party	Candidate	Votes	%
Republican	Mark Jansen	78,240	63.55
Democratic	Albert Abbasse	42,235	34.3
Libertarian	Jamie Lewis	2,648	2.15
Total votes		123,123	100.0
Republican hold			

29th District (Kent (Cascade Township, Grand Rapids, Grattan Township, Kentwood, Lowell, Lowell Township, Vergennes Township))
Party	Candidate	Votes	%
Republican	Bill Hardiman (incumbent)	51,959	52.49
Democratic	David LaGrand	45,595	46.06
Libertarian	Bill Gelineau	1,431	1.45
Total votes		98,985	100.0
Republican hold			

30th District (Ottawa, Kent (Grandville, Sparta Township))
Party	Candidate	Votes	%
Republican	Wayne Kuipers	83,232	71.27
Democratic	Scott Vanderstoep	31,324	26.82
Libertarian	Marcia Ortquist	2,222	1.9
Total votes		116,778	100.0
Republican hold			

31st District (Arenac, Bay, Huron, Sanilac, Tuscola)
Party	Candidate	Votes	%
Democratic	Jim Barcia (incumbent)	78,904	75.93
Republican	Zachary Nuncio	23,565	22.68
Libertarian	Reinhold Ploep	1,441	1.39
Total votes		103,910	100.0
Democratic hold			

32nd District (Gratiot, Saginaw)
Party	Candidate	Votes	%
Republican	Roger Kahn	46,313	49.04
Democratic	Carl Williams	45,793	48.49
Green	Lloyd Clarke	2,326	2.46
Total votes		94,432	100.0
Republican hold			

33rd District (Clinton, Ionia, Isabella, Montcalm)
Party	Candidate	Votes	%
Republican	Alan Cropsey (incumbent)	48,942	53.72
Democratic	Nancy White	40,208	44.13
Libertarian	Devon Smith	1,954	2.14
Total votes		91,104	100.0
Republican hold			

34th District (Mason, Muskegon, Oceana, Newaygo)
Party	Candidate	Votes	%
Republican	Gerald Van Woerkom (incumbent)	53,077	50.68
Democratic	Julie Dennis	51,649	49.32
Total votes		104,726	100.0
Republican hold			

35th District (Benzie, Clare, Kalkaska, Lake, Leelanau, Manistee, Mecosta, Missaukee, Osceola, Roscommon, Wexford)
Party	Candidate	Votes	%
Republican	Michelle McManus (incumbent)	62,195	59.02
Democratic	Antoinette Schippers	41,033	38.94
Libertarian	Thomas Hren	2,148	2.04
Total votes		105,376	100.0
Republican hold			

36th District (Alcona, Alpena, Crawford, Gladwin, Iosco, Midland, Montmorency, Ogemaw, Oscoda, Otsego)
Party	Candidate	Votes	%
Republican	Tony Stamas (incumbent)	65,106	62.09
Democratic	Paul Reid	39,756	37.91
Total votes		104,862	100.0
Republican hold			

37th District (Grand Traverse, Antrim, Charlevoix, Emmet, Cheboygan, Presque Isle, Chippewa, Mackinac)
Party	Candidate	Votes	%
Republican	Jason Allen (incumbent)	63,495	59.21
Democratic	Sharon Unger	43,743	40.79
Total votes		107,238	100.0
Republican hold			

38th District (Upper Peninsula (excluding Mackinac, Chippewa))
Party	Candidate	Votes	%
Democratic	Mike Prusi (incumbent)	66,273	70.32
Republican	Pete Mackin	27,973	29.68
Total votes		94,246	100.0
Democratic hold			

== See also ==
- Michigan House of Representatives election, 2006
