= 2021 Michigan elections =

- November 2, 2021

Two special elections for the Michigan Senate were held in the U.S. state of Michigan on November 2, 2021, in addition to various other local elections and ballot measures.

== Legislature ==
=== State Senate 8th district special election ===
Incumbent Republican Peter Lucido resigned on December 31, 2020, to become prosecutor of Macomb County, Michigan after winning election in 2020. Douglas C. Wozniak, a state representative, won the Republican primary, while Martin Robert Genter, a United Nations Foundation volunteer and political consultant, won the Democratic primary.

2021 Michigan Senate 8th district Republican primary
Party	Candidate	Votes	%
Republican	Douglas Wozniak	9,510	35.68
Republican	Pamela Hornberger	7,861	29.49
Republican	Terence Mekoski	5,553	20.83
Republican	Mary Berlingieri	2,050	7.69
Republican	Kristi Dean	666	2.50
Republican	Bill Carver	645	2.42
Republican	Grant Golasa	372	1.40
Total votes		26,657	100.0

2021 Michigan Senate 8th district Democratic primary
Party	Candidate	Votes	%
Democratic	Martin Robert Genter	9,562	70.51
Democratic	John Bill	3,999	29.49
Total votes		13,561	100.0

2021 Michigan Senate 8th district special election
Party	Candidate	Votes	%
Republican	Douglas Wozniak	30,555	61.9
Democratic	Martin Robert Genter	18,838	38.1
Total votes		49,393	100.0

=== State Senate 28th district special election ===
Incumbent Republican Peter MacGregor resigned on December 31, 2020, to become treasurer of Kent County, Michigan after winning election in 2020. Mark Huizenga, a state representative, won the Republican primary, while Keith Courtade, a former county commissioner, won the Democratic primary.

2021 Michigan Senate 28th district Republican primary
Party	Candidate	Votes	%
Republican	Mark Huizenga	9,531	33.82
Republican	Kevin Green	9,357	33.20
Republican	Tommy Brann	9,272	32.90
Write-in		20	0.08
Total votes		28,180	100.0

2021 Michigan Senate 28th district Democratic primary
Party	Candidate	Votes	%
Democratic	Keith Courtade	6,413	60.94
Democratic	Gidget Groendyk	4,101	38.97
Write-in		10	0.09
Total votes		10,524	100.0

2021 Michigan Senate 28th district special election
Party	Candidate	Votes	%
Republican	Mark Huizenga	25,735	60.28
Democratic	Keith Courtade	15,683	36.74
Libertarian	Alexander Avery	611	1.43
Constitution	Theodore Gerrard	420	0.98
Write-in		38	0.09
Total votes		42,487	100.0

== See also ==
- 2021 United States state legislative elections
