= Superior Walls of America =

Superior Walls of America, Ltd.
- Industry: Construction
- Founded: 1981
- Founder: Mel Zimmerman
- Headquarters: New Holland, Pennsylvania
- Key people: Andrew Zimmerman, CEO
- Products: Xi Plus; Xi; R-5; Ui; AG
- Website: www.superiorwalls.com

Superior Walls of America, Ltd. is a company headquartered in New Holland, Pennsylvania, that specializes in the fabrication and installation of precast concrete foundation systems. It has installed more than 170,000 residential foundations through a North American distribution network since its founding in 1981.

Inc. included the company in its 2007 list of the fastest growing private companies in America.

== Manufacturing process ==
Production procedures follow a multiphase process in an off-site facility. First, production plans are created by CAD designers from architectural blueprints. Forms are prepared with steel rebar and styrofoam. The concrete mix is created at 5,000 psi and bonds directly to the foam insulation. The panels are then finished with the application of a vibrating screen to assist flow and fill potential voids, while creating greater surface consistency.

== Installation ==
Completed wall panels are transported to the job site via special carrier trucks and lowered into place by cranes. Crews install and permanently secure the foundation on a bed of crushed stone. Panels are joined together by stainless-steel bolts and sealed at joints with urethane sealant. The company claims that installations typically take less than one day and can be completed in adverse weather.

== Certifications ==
- Leadership in Energy and Environmental Design (LEED)
- National Green Building Standard
- American Institute of Architects (AIA) and BuildingGreen GreenSpec Directory

== Notable Projects ==
- Grand Castle, a 520-unit apartment complex in Grandville, Michigan. The design is inspired by the Neuschwanstein Castle.
- Katzin Residence in Litchfield, Connecticut. Winner of the 2015 CT Zero Energy Challenge by Energize CT.

== Television ==
- ABC's popular television series Extreme Makeover: Home Edition featured Superior Walls products in thirteen episodes, including the construction of the Harper family home in Lake City, Georgia in 2005.
- PBS's television series This Old House utilized Superior Walls products for their Carlisle Project in 2005, Weston Project in 2008, and the Jamestown House in 2018.
- DIY Network's television series Blog Cabin featured Superior Walls during the 2008 season for work on a cabin in Tennessee.
