= William Van Regenmorter =

American politician

Member of the Michigan House of Representatives from the 74th district
- In office January 1, 2003 – December 31, 2006
- Preceded by: James L. Koetje
- Succeeded by: Dave Agema

Member of the Michigan Senate
- In office January 1, 1991 – December 31, 2002
- Preceded by: Edgar Fredricks
- Succeeded by: Valde Garcia
- Constituency: 23rd district (1991-1994); 22nd district (1995-2002)

Member of the Michigan House of Representatives from the 55th district
- In office January 1, 1983 – December 31, 1990
- Preceded by: Don Gilmer
- Succeeded by: Jessie Dalman

Personal details
- Born: January 29, 1939 Jamestown, Michigan
- Died: June 18, 2012 (aged 73)
- Party: Republican
- Spouse: Cheryl
- Education: Calvin College

William Van Regenmorter (January 29, 1939 – June 18, 2012) was a Republican politician from Ottawa County, Michigan. He served as the representative of Michigan's 55th district from 1982 to 1990 and the 74th district from 2002 to 2006. Between those terms, from 1990 to 2002, he served as senator of the 22nd district. He authored Michigan's Crime Victims Rights Act, which has served as the national model for victims' rights. He also authored and passed two successful amendments to the Michigan Constitution (art. I, sec. 20 and art. I, sec. 24).

== Early life and career ==
Van Regenmorter attended Calvin College. He was a businessman, prior to running for political office, he owned a furniture retail store and served as an analyst at Dun & Bradstreet. He also served as the Ottawa County, Michigan Commissioner.

== Political career ==
Van Regenmorter's political career started with his election into the Michigan State House of Representatives in 1982. He served as the representative of Ottawa County through 1990. Van Regenmorter served several terms in the Michigan State Senate (1990-2002) before being elected to the Michigan State House of Representatives in 2002. VanRegenmorter announced that he would not seek election in 2006 for health reasons. He is most widely known for authoring Michigan's Crime Victims Rights Amendment and had been seen as a national leader on this issue.

He served and headed various committees during his time in office, including the chair of the Judiciary Committee for 16 years. Other committee positions include Corrections (M.V.C.), Economic Development & Energy, and House Oversight.

His work included initiating several reforms in the criminal justice system, revisions of the juvenile code, changes in sentencing procedures for dangerous felons and enactment of community placement provisions. He stressed the need for improving the cost-efficiency of the state's own budget operations. Another major accomplishment was his work with State Representative Michael Nye in sponsoring and passing legislation to create the family division of Michigan's circuit court in the mid-1990's. The family division is a specialized court with jurisdiction over a wide range of family-related litigation including domestic relations, child abuse/neglect, and delinquency. The goal was to create a system of "one family, one judge" where a single judge would preside over all issues of a single family in the court system.

== Death ==
He died at age 73, after a battle with Parkinson's disease. Flags across the state were lowered to half-mast in his honor.

== Bibliographical Information ==
There is little information written about the life of Van Regenmorter prior to his political career. The biographical sketches published by the state of Michigan contain what little is written about his life before his election to the State House of Representatives in 1982. These include The Michigan Manual of 1983–84, 1987–88, and 2001–2002. All of which state his date of birth, January 29, 1939, in Jamestown Michigan. His obituary in the Grand Rapids Press also contains this information along with the names of his parents, William Sr. and Zora (Van Oss) Van Regenmorter. Following his birth no other information is provided until mention of his schooling, which took place at Calvin College. There is another lapse in biographical information between his time at Calvin College and his professional career. Capitol Profiles states that William was a financial analyst for Dun & Bradstreet and at one point he was the owner of a retail furniture store. It is documented in the 1983-84 edition of the Michigan Manual that Van Regenmorter was a member of the Christian Reformed Church.

The political career of Van Regenmorter is the most detailed portion of his life. In comparing the three manuals one can see some subtle changes throughout the years. The 1983-84 edition coincided with Van Regenmorter's second year in office and states that before the 1982 election he served as Ottawa County Commissioner. In his first term as Representative of Michigan's 55th district he served on the National Association of Criminal Justice Planners. His biographical sketch in the 1987-88 edition showed that Van Regenmorter was the director of the Michigan Victim Alliance as well as the Chairman of Michigan's Republican Caucus. The 2001-2002 edition of the Michigan Manual contains the info of his final term as a Michigan senator. At this time he served on both the Gaming and Casino Oversight committee and the Joint Committee on Administrative Rules. This edition also recognized that he was the author of the Crime Victim's Rights Act and two successful amendments to the Michigan Constitution.

The majority of the writing found on William Van Regenmorter is concerned with his work with crime victims' rights, specifically his authorship of the William Van Regenmorter Crime Victims Rights Act and the subsequent amendment to Michigan's constitution. In a tribute following Van Regenmorter's death the Office for Victims of Crime (OVC) stated that his influence over the development of victims' rights policy has spread across the country, and that the Michigan Victims Bill of Rights has served as the model in drafting Arizona's law, that in turn, served as the model for many other states' amendments. A copy of the act and amendment can be found on Michigan Legislature's digital government publications website.

The policy reforms and amendments were so influential that in 1989 Pepperdine Law Review conducted a study of the history of Michigan's reforms on crime victims' rights, focusing on the Crime Victims Rights Act and Van Regenmorter's authorship. Van Regenmorter, in an article published by the Grand Rapids Business Journal, described how the federal Crime Victims Rights Act was approved using language from Michigan's constitutional amendment.

By far the most informative piece concerning William Van Regenmorter, other than his own personal collection, is the University of Akron's Oral History interview. In the 2003 interview Van Regenmorter stated his reasons of interest in crime victims' rights. The interview discusses the context in which Van Regenmorter started his policy making concerning victims' rights, the challenges involved, successes, failures, and future plans concerning the same subject.

Throughout his years as both a representative and senator in the Michigan state legislature Van Regenmorter has won a considerable number of awards. In an online publication of the Michigan Manual of 2003-04 it is stated that William was the recipient of Michigan "Legislator of the Year" eleven times and the "National Legislator of the Year" by the National Victim Center. Van Regenmorter's obituary stated that his death was on June 18, 2012, after having struggled with Parkinson's Disease for nine years. The Office of Victims of Crime's tribute to Van Regenmorter described how on June 20, 2012, Governor Rick Snyder ordered that flags were to be lowered at half-staff in honor of Senator Van Regenmorter.
