= Michigan's 74th House of Representatives district =

American legislative district

Michigan's 74th State House of Representatives district
Representative
Kara Hope; D–Holt
- Demographics: 57.9% White; 17% Black; 11.5% Hispanic; 5.9% Asian; 0.3% Native American; 1.3% Other; 6.3% Multiracial
- Population (2024): 89,201

Michigan's 74th House of Representatives district (also referred to as Michigan's 74th House district) is a legislative district within the Michigan House of Representatives located in part of Ingham County. The district was created in 1965, when the Michigan House of Representatives district naming scheme changed from a county-based system to a numerical one.

== List of representatives ==
Representative	Party	Dates	Residence	Notes
Joseph M. Snyder	Democratic	1965–1974	St. Clair Shores	
John M. Maynard	Democratic	1975–1990	St. Clair Shores	
Tracey A. Yokich	Democratic	1991–1992	St. Clair Shores	
Ken Sikkema	Republican	1993–1998	Grandville	
James L. Koetje	Republican	1999–2002	Grandville	
William Van Regenmorter	Republican	2003–2006	Georgetown Township	
David Agema	Republican	2007–2012	Grandville	
Robert VerHeulen	Republican	2013–2018	Walker	
Mark Huizenga	Republican	2019–2021	Walker	Resigned after elected to the Michigan Senate.
Carol Glanville	Democratic	2022	Walker	
Kara Hope	Democratic	2023–present	Holt	
Harold Pope	Democratic	(Note: Member-elect.)	Lansing	

== Recent elections ==
=== 2020s ===
2026 Michigan House of Representatives election
Party	Candidate	Votes	%
Democratic	Harold A. Pope	28,869	73.08
Republican	Clinton Tarver	10,632	26.92
Total votes		39,501	100
Democratic hold			

2022 special election
Party	Candidate	Votes	%
Democratic	Carol Glanville	7,288	51.7
Republican	Robert Regan	5,697	40.4
Total votes		14,102	100
Democratic gain from Republican			

2020 Michigan House of Representatives election
Party	Candidate	Votes	%
Republican	Mark E. Huizenga	34,068	63.13
Democratic	Meagan L. Hintz	19,897	36.87
Total votes		53,965	100
Republican hold			

2018 Michigan House of Representatives election
Party	Candidate	Votes	%
Republican	Mark E. Huizenga	24,445	60.49
Democratic	Meagan L. Carr	15,964	39.51
Total votes		40,409	100
Republican hold			

2016 Michigan House of Representatives election
Party	Candidate	Votes	%
Republican	Robert VerHeulen	29,255	64.51
Democratic	Robin Bigger	13,915	30.68
Libertarian	Bill Gelineau	2,183	4.81
Total votes		45,353	100
Republican hold			

2014 Michigan House of Representatives election
Party	Candidate	Votes	%
Republican	Robert VerHeulen	18,787	68.83
Democratic	Richard Erdman	8,507	31.17
Total votes		27,294	100
Republican hold			

2012 Michigan House of Representatives election
Party	Candidate	Votes	%
Republican	Robert VerHeulen	27,406	65.55
Democratic	Richard Erdman	14,406	34.45
Total votes		41,812	100
Republican hold			

2010 Michigan House of Representatives election
Party	Candidate	Votes	%
Republican	David Agema	27,509	80.69
Democratic	Leon Chase	6,583	19.31
Total votes		34,092	100
Republican hold			

2008 Michigan House of Representatives election
Party	Candidate	Votes	%
Republican	David Agema	36,204	70.25
Democratic	Leon Chase	13,421	26.04
Libertarian	Tracey McLaughlin	1,911	3.71
Total votes		51,536	100
Republican hold			

== Historical district boundaries ==
Map	Description	Apportionment Plan	Notes
	Macomb County (part): Lake Township; St. Clair Shores (part)	1964 Apportionment Plan	
	Macomb County (part): Lake Township; St. Clair Shores (part)	1972 Apportionment Plan	
	Macomb County (part): East Detroit (part); Lake Township; St. Clair Shores	1982 Apportionment Plan	
	Kent County (part): Alpine Township; Cedar Springs; Courtland Township; Grandville; Grattan Township; Nelson Township; Oakland Township; Solon Township; Sparta Township; Spencer Township; Tyrone Township; Walker; Ottawa County (part): Tallmadge Township	1992 Apportionment Plan	
	Kent County (part): Alpine Township; Grandville; Ottawa County (part): Coopersville; Crockery Township; Georgetown Township; Polkton Township; Tallmadge Township; Wright Township	2001 Apportionment Plan	
	Kent County (part): Algoma Township; Alpine Township; Cedar Springs; Grandville; Rockford; Solon Township; Sparta Township; Tyrone Township; Walker	2011 Apportionment Plan	
