= Michigan's 69th House of Representatives district =

American legislative district

Michigan's 69th State House of Representatives district
Representative
Jasper Martus; D–Flushing
- Demographics: 68.6% White; 20.9% Black; 4.7% Hispanic; 0.8% Asian; 0.2% Native American; 0.3% Other; 4.6% Multiracial
- Population (2024): 89,125

Michigan's 69th House of Representatives district (also referred to as Michigan's 69th House district) is a legislative district within the Michigan House of Representatives located in part of Genesee County. The district was created in 1965, when the Michigan House of Representatives district naming scheme changed from a county-based system to a numerical one.

== List of representatives ==
Representative	Party	Dates	Residence	Notes
Daniel S. Cooper	Democratic	1965–1970	Oak Park	
Philip O. Mastin Jr.	Democratic	1971–1976	Hazel Park	
Dana F. Wilson	Democratic	1977–1982	Hazel Park	Resigned.
Wilfred D. Webb	Democratic	1982	Hazel Park	
Wilbur Brotherton	Republican	1983-1988	Farmington	
Jan C. Dolan	Republican	1989-1992	Farmington Hills	
David Hollister	Democratic	1993	Lansing	Elected mayor of Lansing.
Lynne Martinez	Democratic	1994-2000	Lansing	
Michael C. Murphy	Democratic	2001-2002	Lansing	
Gretchen Whitmer	Democratic	2003-2006	East Lansing	Resigned after election to Michigan Senate.
Mark Meadows	Democratic	2006-2012	East Lansing	
Sam Singh	Democratic	2013-2018	East Lansing	
Julie Brixie	Democratic	2019–2022	Okemos	
Jasper Martus	Democratic	2023–present	Flushing	

== Recent elections ==
=== 2020s ===
2026 Michigan House of Representatives election
Party	Candidate	Votes	%
Democratic	Jasper Ryan Martus (incumbent)	24,010	60.17
Republican	Patrick Duvendeck	15,103	37.85
Libertarian	Adam Blake Childress	790	1.98
Total votes		39,903	100
Democratic hold			

2018 Michigan House of Representatives election
Party	Candidate	Votes	%
Democratic	Julie Brixie	27,353	71.60
Republican	George Nastas	10,847	28.40
Total votes		38,200	100
Democratic hold			

2016 Michigan House of Representatives election
Party	Candidate	Votes	%
Democratic	Sam Singh	29,366	68.37%
Republican	George Nastas III	13,585	31.63%
Total votes		42,951	100.00%
Democratic hold			

2014 Michigan House of Representatives election
Party	Candidate	Votes	%
Democratic	Sam Singh	18,475	67.84
Republican	Frank Lambert	8,759	32.16
Total votes		27,234	100.0
Democratic hold			

2012 Michigan House of Representatives election
Party	Candidate	Votes	%
Democratic	Sam Singh	26,200	64.90
Republican	Susan McGillicuddy	14,172	35.10
Total votes		40,372	100.0
Democratic hold			

2010 Michigan House of Representatives election
Party	Candidate	Votes	%
Democratic	Mark Meadows	16,780	61.62
Republican	Susan McGillicuddy	10,450	38.38
Total votes		27,230	100.0
Democratic hold			

2008 Michigan House of Representatives election
Party	Candidate	Votes	%
Democratic	Mark Meadows	30,948	69.17
Republican	Frank Lambert	13,794	30.83
Total votes		44,742	100.0
Democratic hold			

== Historical district boundaries ==
Map	Description	Apportionment Plan	Notes
	Oakland County (part): Ferndale; Hazel Park (part); Huntington Woods; Oak Park (part); Pleasant Ridge	1964 Apportionment Plan	
	Oakland County (part): Ferndale; Hazel Park; Huntington Woods; Oak Park (part); Pleasant Ridge	1972 Apportionment Plan	
	Oakland County (part): Farmington; Farmington Hills; Southfield Township	1982 Apportionment Plan	
	Ingham County (part): Lansing (part); Lansing Township (part)	1992 Apportionment Plan	
	Ingham County (part): East Lansing (part); Lansing (part); Meridian Township; Williamstown Township (part)	2001 Apportionment Plan	
	Ingham County (part): East Lansing (part); Lansing (part); Locke Township; Meridian Township; Williamstown Township	2011 Apportionment Plan	
