= CAPAC =

CAPAC may refer to:

- Congressional Asian Pacific American Caucus, U.S. Congressional Caucus
- Congressional Asian Pacific American Caucus Leadership PAC, Political Action Committee
- Capac, Michigan
- Composers, Authors and Publishers Association of Canada
- Cápac, a title designating a King in various Andean civilizations
