= Michigan's 77th House of Representatives district =

American legislative district

Michigan's 77th State House of Representatives district
Representative
Emily Dievendorf; D–Lansing
- Demographics: 69.1% White; 11.7% Black; 9.4% Hispanic; 2% Asian; 0.1% Native American; 0.7% Other; 7% Multiracial
- Population (2024): 94,582

Michigan's 77th House of Representatives district (also referred to as Michigan's 77th House district) is a legislative district within the Michigan House of Representatives located in parts of Clinton, Eaton, Ingham counties. The district was created in 1965, when the Michigan House of Representatives district naming scheme changed from a county-based system to a numerical one.

== List of representatives ==
Representative	Party	Dates	Residence	Notes
Quincy P. Hoffman	Republican	1965–1980	Applegate	
Keith Muxlow	Republican	1981–1982	Brown City	
Richard D. Allen	Republican	1983–1992	Fairgrove	Lived in Caro until around 1987.
Harold J. Voorhees Sr.	Republican	1993–1998	Grand Rapids	Lived in Wyoming until around 1997.
Joanne Voorhees	Republican	1999–2004	Wyoming	Lived in Grandville until around 2003.
Kevin Green	Republican	2005–2010	Wyoming	
Thomas Hooker	Republican	2011–2016	Byron Center	Lived in Wyoming from around 2013 to 2014.
Tommy Brann	Republican	2017–2022	Byron Center	
Emily Dievendorf	Democratic	2023–present	Lansing	

== Recent elections ==
=== 2020s ===
2026 Michigan House of Representatives election
Party	Candidate	Votes	%
Democratic	Emily Dievendorf (incumbent)	29,005	65.01
Republican	Sally Jo Nelton	14,387	32.25
Libertarian	Jennifer Long	1,222	2.74
Total votes		44,614	100
Democratic hold			

2018 Michigan House of Representatives election
Party	Candidate	Votes	%
Republican	Tommy Brann	22,514	59.88
Democratic	Dana Knight	13,819	36.76
Libertarian	Patty Malowney	866	2.30
Constitution	Brandon Hoezee	398	1.06
Total votes		37,597	100
Republican hold			

2016 Michigan House of Representatives election
Party	Candidate	Votes	%
Republican	Tommy Brann	27,946	65.80%
Democratic	Dana Knight	14,528	34.20%
Total votes		42,474	100.00%
Republican hold			

2014 Michigan House of Representatives election
Party	Candidate	Votes	%
Republican	Thomas Hooker	16,117	67.0
Democratic	Jessica Hanselman	7,940	33.0
Total votes		24,057	100.0
Republican hold			

2012 Michigan House of Representatives election
Party	Candidate	Votes	%
Republican	Thomas Hooker	23,599	60.37
Democratic	Scott Barton	14,191	36.30
Libertarian	Larry Warner	1,300	3.33
Total votes		39,090	100.0
Republican hold			

2010 Michigan House of Representatives election
Party	Candidate	Votes	%
Republican	Thomas Hooker	18,088	72.35
Democratic	Scott Barton	6,913	27.65
Total votes		25,001	100.0
Republican hold			

2008 Michigan House of Representatives election
Party	Candidate	Votes	%
Republican	Kevin Green	25,338	62.38
Democratic	Charles Geerlings	14,119	34.76
Libertarian	Mike Orcutt	1,161	2.86
Total votes		40,618	100.0
Republican hold			

== Historical district boundaries ==
Map	Description	Apportionment Plan	Notes
	Huron County (part): Bad Axe; Bingham Township; Bloomfield Township; Caseville Township; Chandler Township; Colfax Township; Dwight Township; Gore Township; Harbor Beach; Hume Township; Huron Township; Lake Township; Lincoln Township; McKinley Township; Meade Township; Paris Township; Pointe Aux Barques Township; Port Austin Township; Rubicon Township; Sand Beach Township; Sheridan Township; Sherman Township; Sigel Township; Verona Township; Sanilac County St. Clair County (part): Berlin Township; Brockway Township; Burtchville Township; Emmett Township; Grant Township; Greenwood Township; Kenockee Township; Lynn Township; Mussey Township; Riley Township; Wales Township; Yale	1964 Apportionment Plan	
	Huron County Lapeer County (part): Burlington Township; Burnside Township; Goodland Township; Rich Township; Sanilac County St. Clair County (part): Brockway Township; Burtchville Township; Grant Township; Lynn Township; Yale	1972 Apportionment Plan	
	Huron County Tuscola County (part): Akron Township; Almer Township; Columbia Township; Dayton Township; Denmark Township; Elkland Township; Ellington Township; Elmwood Township; Fairgrove Township; Fremont Township; Gilford Township; Indianfields Township; Juniata Township; Kingston Township; Koylton Township; Novesta Township; Tuscola Township; Vassar; Vassar Township; Wells Township; Wisner Township	1982 Apportionment Plan	
	Kent County (part): Grand Rapids (part); Wyoming	1992 Apportionment Plan	
	Kent County (part): Byron Township; Wyoming	2001 Apportionment Plan	
	Kent County (part): Byron Township; Wyoming	2011 Apportionment Plan	
