= Rashida Harrison =

American politician

Member-elect of the Michigan Senate from the 28th district
- Assuming office January 2027
- Succeeding: Sam Singh

Personal details
- Party: Democratic

Rashida Harrison is an American politician. A member of the Democratic Party, she is the member-elect for the 28th district of the Michigan Senate.
