= Sam Singh =

American politician (born 1971)

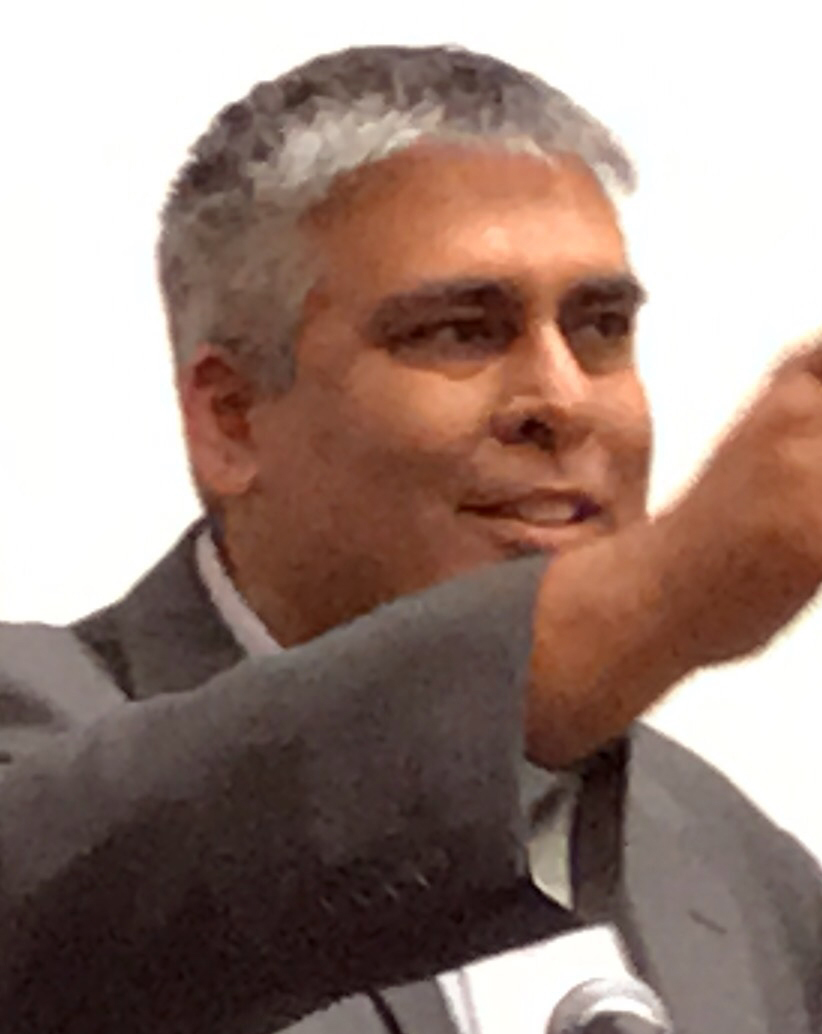

Member of the Michigan Senate from the 28th district
- Incumbent
- Assumed office January 1, 2023
- Preceded by: Mark Huizenga (redistricted)
- Succeeded by: Rashida Harrison (elect)

Minority Leader of the Michigan House of Representatives
- In office January 11, 2017 – January 9, 2019
- Preceded by: Tim Greimel
- Succeeded by: Christine Greig

Member of the Michigan House of Representatives from the 69th district
- In office January 1, 2013 – January 1, 2019
- Preceded by: Mark Meadows
- Succeeded by: Julie Brixie

Mayor of East Lansing
- In office January 1, 2006 – December 31, 2007
- Preceded by: Mark Meadows
- Succeeded by: Vic Loomis

Personal details
- Born: Samir Singh; March 4, 1971 (age 55)
- Party: Democratic
- Spouse: Kerry
- Education: Michigan State University (BA)

Samir Singh (born March 4, 1971) is a Democratic politician from Michigan who serves in the Michigan Senate. He formerly served as a member of the East Lansing City Council and was one of the state's youngest city council members when he joined at age 24. Additionally, he served as mayor of the city for one term and was the first person of color to hold that position. He is a past president of the Michigan Nonprofit Association. In November 2016, Singh was selected by his House Democratic colleagues to serve as Minority Leader for the 2017-18 session. In the 2022 election, Singh was elected to the Michigan Senate, where he currently represents the 28th district. On March 2, 2026, he announced that he would not seek re-election.

Michigan House of Representatives
Preceded by Tim Greimel	Minority Leader of the Michigan House of Representatives; 2017–2019	Succeeded by Christine Greig
