= David Agema =

American politician (born 1949)

Member of the Michigan House of Representatives from the 74th district
- In office January 1, 2007 – December 31, 2012
- Preceded by: William Van Regenmorter
- Succeeded by: Robert VerHeulen

Personal details
- Born: February 11, 1949 (age 77) Grand Rapids, Michigan, U.S.
- Party: Republican
- Spouse: Barb Agema
- Children: 3
- Education: Calvin College; Central Michigan University
- Occupation: Politician

David Agema (born February 11, 1949) is a politician from the U.S. state of Michigan. Presently the chairman of the Top Gun Republican political action committee, he is a former member of the Michigan House of Representatives and of the Republican National Committee. Agema, formerly a commercial pilot for American Airlines, is an Air Force Reserve veteran. He currently resides in Grandville, Michigan.

== Early life and education ==
Agema was born in Grand Rapids, Michigan, on February 11, 1949, in an American family of Dutch origin. He received a Bachelor of Arts from Calvin College in 1971 and an M.B.A. from Central Michigan University in 1975. He served as a fighter pilot in the United States Air Force but never served overseas. In 1978, he joined the Air National Guard, retiring as a lieutenant colonel. Agema then worked for American Airlines and later as a business consultant.

== Political involvement ==
Agema is an anti-abortion Republican, who is actively vocal in his opposition to same-sex marriage and civil unions.

Agema served three terms (the constitutional limit) in the Michigan House of Representatives, from 2007 to 2013, representing parts of the Grand Rapids area. The American Conservative Union gave him a 100% rating. He was elected at the 2012 Michigan Republican State Convention to the Republican National Committee, defeating incumbent Saul Anuzis. In 2016 he was replaced by Robert Steele.

=== Political controversies ===
In 2013, he faced calls to resign from the Republican National Committee after he posted extracts from an article entitled "Everyone Should Know These Statistics On Homosexuals" which said that homosexuals lived a "filthy lifestyle", were responsible for 50 percent of U.S. murders in certain cities and that many are pedophiles. The article cited the white supremacist writer and Holocaust denier Ed Fields. Agema was rebuked by RNC chairman Reince Priebus, who drew a distinction between Republican policies on gay rights and the language used in Agema's post, adding "all human beings deserve to be treated with dignity and respect."

Later that year, Agema was condemned by Michigan Governor Rick Snyder after saying that homosexuals were in favor of healthcare reform because "some are dying between 30 and 44 years old." Agema posted several statistics on his web page from newer biased sources confirming earlier death.

In addition to his comments about homosexuals, Agema quoted an article written by another in response to Obama's statement that Muslims have a rich fabric in the history of the United States, "Have you ever seen a Muslim do anything that contributes positively to the American way of life?". This was in reference to the lack of historical record of Obama's statement. Muslim Republicans took offense to this and cited contribution from their families and friends. Additionally, his bill to ban foreign law and Sharia Law (ALAC) (passed by several other states) was seen as an attempt to engender paranoia against Muslims. Agema's comments on Muslims, "styled as an open missive to President Obama", led to the resignation in 2015 of a Maine private-academy lacrosse coach who had re-posted them on Facebook.

On December 31, 2014, Agema reposted an article printed by former Congressman and retired Army lieutenant colonel Allen West in his news letter. West stated he had personally observed some of this and that it would seem racists but needed to be addressed. The article was written pseudonymously and ran in the white nationalist magazine American Renaissance, and included sentences by a public defender concerning certain felons with multiple convictions he had to defend stating certain "[B]lacks are different by almost any measure to all other people. They cannot reason as well (referring to these felons). They cannot communicate as well. They cannot control their impulses as well. They are a threat to all who cross their paths, black and non-black alike." Chairman Reince Priebus subsequently called on him to resign his RNC position. He did not resign.

=== Electoral history ===
2012 MIGOP State Convention – Republican National Committeeman (May 19, 2012)
Party	Candidate	Votes	%
Republican	Dave Agema	1,467	69.07
Republican	Saul Anuzis	639	30.08
Republican	Gerald LaRouche	18	0.85
Total votes		2,124	100.00

2010 General Election – 74th District State Representative (November 2, 2010)
Party	Candidate	Votes	%
Republican	Dave Agema	28,846	78.97
Democratic	Leon Chase	6,908	18.91
Libertarian	R. J. Stevens	773	2.12
Total votes		36,527	100.00

2008 General Election – 74th District State Representative (November 4, 2008)
Party	Candidate	Votes	%
Republican	Dave Agema	36,207	70.25
Democratic	Leon Chase	13,421	26.04
Libertarian	Tracy McLaughlin	1,911	3.71
Total votes		51,539	100.00

2006 General Election – 74th District State Representative (November 7, 2006)
Party	Candidate	Votes	%
Republican	Dave Agema	30,495	70.13
Democratic	Steven Kauffman	12,109	27.85
Libertarian	Tracy McLaughlin	880	2.02
Total votes		43,484	100.00

2006 Republican Primary – 74th District State Representative (August 8, 2006)
Party	Candidate	Votes	%
Republican	Dave Agema	4,333	36.92
Republican	Rich VanderKlok	1,906	16.24
Republican	Jose Gomez	1,819	15.50
Republican	Janis DeVree	1,567	13.35
Republican	Joe Sierawski	550	4.69
Republican	Brian VanLente	412	3.51
Republican	Joanne Brownlee	387	3.30
Republican	Cornelius VanderKam	365	3.11
Republican	Dawn Sloboda	249	2.12
Republican	Kyle Braddell	147	1.25
Total votes		11,735	100.00

== Personal life ==
He has been married for more than forty five years to his wife Barb. They have three children and ten grandchildren.

Political offices
Preceded by William Van Regenmorter	Michigan State Representative, 74th House District; January 2007 – December 2012	Succeeded by Rob VerHeulen
Party political offices
Preceded by Saul Anuzis	Republican National Committeeman from Michigan; August 2012 – present	Succeeded by incumbent
