= Thomas Hooker (politician) =

American politician

Thomas B. Hooker

Member of the Michigan House of Representatives from the 77th district
- In office January 1, 2011 – December 16, 2016
- Preceded by: Kevin Green
- Succeeded by: Tommy Brann

Personal details
- Born: April 25, 1950 (age 76) Wyoming, Michigan
- Party: Republican
- Spouse: Pam
- Children: Two
- Education: Western Michigan University (M.A.); Grand Valley State University
- Occupation: Teacher
- Website: State Rep. Tom Hooker

Thomas Hooker is a Republican politician from the U.S. state of Michigan. He is currently a member of the Michigan House of Representatives, representing the 77th District which covers the city of Wyoming and Byron Township. Hooker was elected in 2010 and is currently serving his third term as a State Representative. Prior to becoming a member of the Michigan House, Hooker was a school teacher in the Byron Center School District for 37 years. He is being term-limited in 2016, and on August 2, 2016, he won the primary race to be the Republican nominee for Byron Township Supervisor.

== Education ==
Hooker earned a bachelor's degree from Grand Valley State University and a master's degree from Western Michigan University.
