= Julie Brixie =

American politician

Member of the Michigan House of Representatives
- Incumbent
- Assumed office January 1, 2019
- Preceded by: Sam Singh
- Constituency: 69th district (2019–2022); 73rd district (2023–present)

Personal details
- Born: Chicago, Illinois, U.S.
- Party: Democratic
- Education: University of Illinois, Urbana-Champaign (BS); Michigan State University (MS)
- Website: Campaign website

Julie Brixie is a Democratic member of the Michigan House of Representatives.

== Biography ==
Brixie was born in Chicago, Illinois, to two teachers. She received a B.S. in physical geography from the University of Illinois. During college, she met her husband, and the two moved to East Lansing, Michigan. There, she received her master's in crop and soil sciences with a specialization in environmental toxicology from Michigan State University. She then ran a mobile laboratory, conducting investigations and cleanups of contaminated sites in Michigan, and raised her children with her husband in mid-Michigan.

== Political career ==
Brixie served on the Meridian Township board for eighteen years. She has served two terms in the Michigan House of Representatives starting in 2019, and served on the Appropriations, Oversight, Administrative Rules, and Tax Policy committees. Brixie represented the 69th district from 2019 until 2022, when she was elected to the 73rd district. She was reelected in 2024.

Michigan House of Representatives
Preceded by Sam Singh	Member of the Michigan House of Representatives from the 69th district 2019–2022	Succeeded by Jasper Martus
Preceded by Bryan Posthumus	Member of the Michigan House of Representatives from the 73rd district 2023–present	Incumbent
