= Emily Dievendorf =

American politician

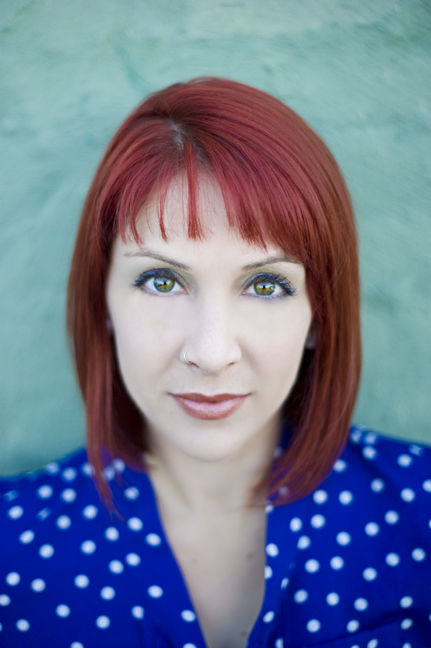
- Dievendorf in 2011

Member of the Michigan House of Representatives from the 77th district
- Incumbent
- Assumed office January 1, 2023
- Preceded by: Tommy Brann

Personal details
- Party: Democratic
- Education: Michigan State University (BA)

Emily Dievendorf is an American politician from Michigan. They have served in the Michigan House of Representatives since 2023, representing the 77th district.

== Early life and career ==
Dievendorf is from Kalamazoo, Michigan. They moved to Lansing in 1997 to enroll at Michigan State University. They had an internship with the Michigan State Legislature and stayed in Lansing after graduating, working for Alexander Lipsey and Andy Coulouris. They then joined Equality Michigan, becoming executive director. Dievendorf and Fae Mitchell opened The Resistance, a bookstore in Lansing, in 2022.

== Political career ==
Dievendorf was elected to the Michigan House of Representatives in 2022, representing the 77th district. They were reelected in 2024.

== Personal life ==
Dievendorf is bisexual and nonbinary. They are the first openly nonbinary Michigan state representative.
