= Jasper Martus =

American politician from Michigan

Michigan State Representative

Member of the Michigan House of Representatives from the 69th district
- In office January 1, 2023 – current
- Preceded by: Julie Brixie

Personal details
- Born: January 4, 2000 (age 26) Flushing, Michigan
- Party: Democratic
- Parent: David Martus Karianne Martus
- Education: Michigan State University (BA)
- Profession: Politician

Jasper Ryan "Jaz" Martus is an American Democratic politician from Michigan. He was elected to the Michigan House of Representatives from the 69th district in the 2022 election. He was reelected in 2024, and again in 2026 by a larger margin.

== Early life, education and career ==
Martus is from Flushing, Michigan, one of the communities in the district he was elected to represent in 2022. He was born to parents David and Karianne Martus and has a brother, Max.

Martus is Catholic and graduated from Luke M. Powers Catholic High School before completing his bachelor’s degree from Michigan State University in 2021.He graduated from James Madison College at Michigan State University with a degree in International Relations and a minor in World Religions.

Before running for office himself, Martus worked as a staffer for Congressman Dan Kildee and State Senator Jim Ananich, as well as working as a communications advisor for the Michigan House Democrats.

== Political career ==
=== Michigan State House of Representatives ===
==== 2022 Primary and General Elections ====
After the 2020 United States Census, the state of Michigan redistricted their state legislature. In doing so, a new district was created containing Flushing, Mount Morris, Clio, Montrose, and parts of Swartz Creek and Flint Township. In the open primary, Martus ran against Jenifer Almassy and Kenyetta Dotson, winning with 39.0% of the vote.

Martus ran with the support of the United Auto Workers, the Michigan Education Association, State Senator Jim Ananich, and State Representative Tim Sneller.

Martus would go on to win the general election with 56.3% of the vote against Republican challenger Jesse Couch, who received 41.0% of the vote.

==== First Term ====
In 2024, the Small Business Association of Michigan named Martus their "Legislator of the Year," citing the work Martus had done in his first term in ensuring small businesses were included in the Michigan research and development tax credit legislation as the primary reason for the award.

==== 2024 Primary and General Elections ====
In 2024, Martus ran unopposed in the Democratic primary. He defeated Republican challenger Patrick Duvendeck in the general election with 56.3% of the vote compared to Duvendeck's 43.7% vote share.

2026 Primary and General Elections

In 2026, Martus ran unopposed in the Democratic primary. He again defeated Republican challenger Patrick Duvendeck in the general election with 60.2% of the vote compared to Duvendeck's 37.8% vote share.
