= Mark Jansen (politician) =

American politician (1959–2021)

Member of the Michigan Senate from the 28th district
- In office January 1, 2007 – December 31, 2014
- Preceded by: Ken Sikkema
- Succeeded by: Peter MacGregor

Member of the Michigan House of Representatives from the 72nd district
- In office January 1, 1997 – December 31, 2002
- Preceded by: Walter DeLange
- Succeeded by: Glenn Steil

Personal details
- Born: September 13, 1959
- Died: March 23, 2021 (aged 61)
- Party: Republican
- Spouse: LeAnne

Mark C. Jansen was an American politician from the state of Michigan. A member of the Republican Party, he represented the 28th district in the Michigan Senate. He considered running for the United States House of Representatives in Michigan's 3rd congressional district against Justin Amash in 2014.

Jansen, who had been diagnosed with brain cancer in 2020, died March 23, 2021, aged 61.
