= Mark Meadows (Michigan politician) =

American politician

Mark Stephen Meadows
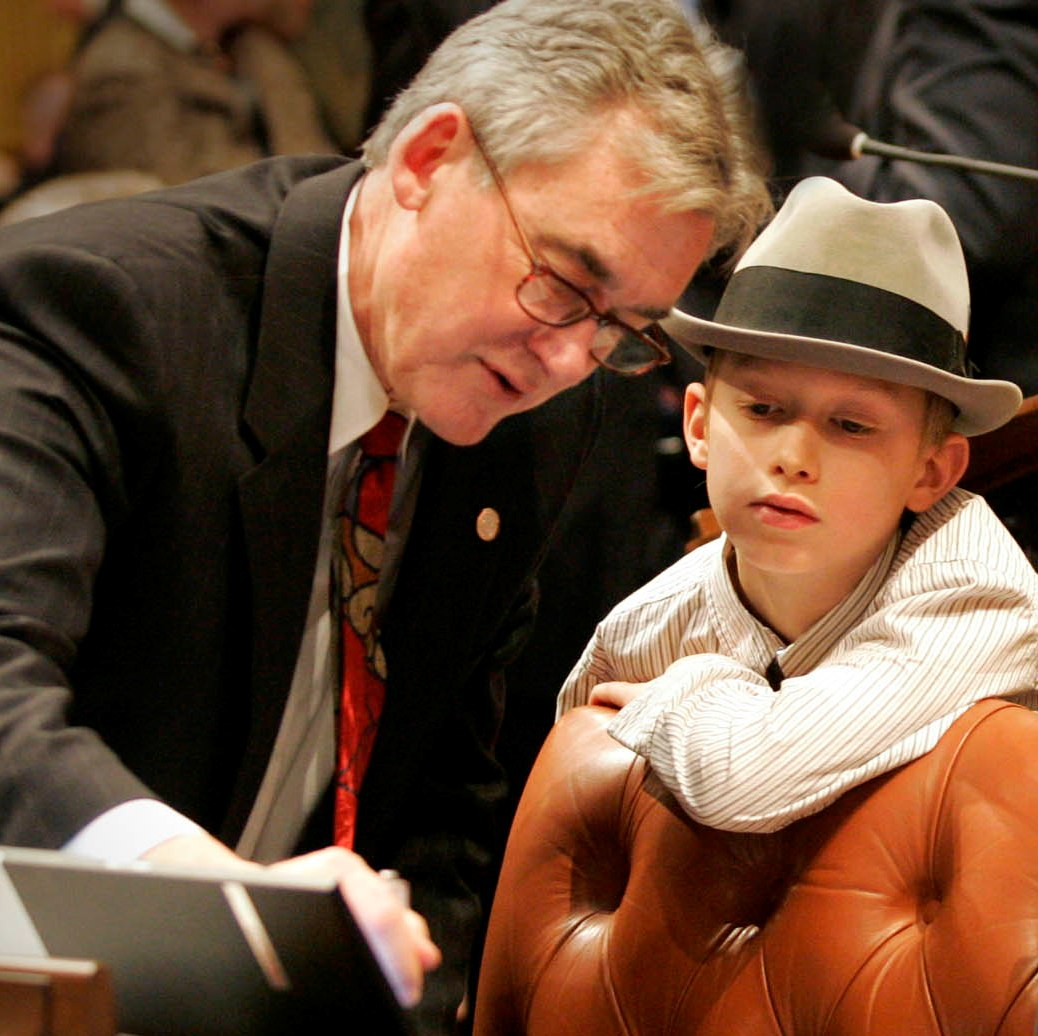

Mayor of East Lansing
- In office November 17, 2015 – November 12, 2019
- Preceded by: Nathan Triplett
- Succeeded by: Ruth Beier
- In office 1997–2005
- Preceded by: Douglas Jester
- Succeeded by: Sam Singh

Member of the Michigan House of Representatives from the 69th district
- In office November 16, 2006 – December 31, 2012
- Preceded by: Gretchen Whitmer
- Succeeded by: Sam Singh

Personal details
- Born: April 29, 1947 (age 79) Grosse Point Farms, Michigan
- Party: Democratic
- Spouse: Pam
- Children: 4
- Occupation: Attorney, politician

Mark S. Meadows (born April 29, 1947) is an attorney and politician from East Lansing, Michigan. He was elected 6 times to the East Lansing City Council and served from 1995 to 2006, from 2015 until his resignation during a city council meeting on July 14, 2020, and from 2023 to 2027. While on city council, he served as East Lansing Mayor from 1997 to 2006 and again from 2015 to 2019,becoming the longest serving Mayor in the City's history. He is also a former member of the Michigan House of Representatives.

== Career ==
Mark Meadows began his career as an Assistant Attorney General for the Michigan Department of Attorney General in 1975, after earning his Juris Doctor degree that year from the Detroit College Of Law (Now Michigan State University College Of Law). Some notable cases involved represented the Department of Social Services, Mental Health, Natural Resources, and State Police. He also represented the Public Service Commission and was general counsel to the Commission on Law Enforcement Standards. He retired from the Department of Attorney General in 2002 and joined the law firm of Willingham and Cote in East Lansing.

Meadows ran for East Lansing City Council in 1993 but was unsuccessful. In 1995 he ran again, winning the seat and later being elected by the council to serve as Mayor from 1997 until stepping down in 2005.

He served the 69th District of the Michigan House of Representatives from 2006 through 2012. While in the Michigan House, Meadows served as Chair of the Health Care Reform Committee; Chair of the Judiciary Committee, Assistant Speaker, Chair of the House Democratic Campaign Committee and Assistant Democratic Leader. In 2012 Meadows ran for judge of 54B District Court, losing to Andrea Larkin.

In 2015, he again was elected to the East Lansing City Council and elected Mayor. He stepped down as Mayor in 2019 but remained a councilperson until abruptly resigning in protest during a City Council Meeting on July 14, 2020 where council voted to terminate the City Attorney's contract.

Meadows has also served on various committees and boards, including the East Lansing Commission on the Environment, The East Lansing Planning Commission, the Board of Directors for the Michigan Festival and National Folk Festival, The Board of Directors of The Hospice of Lansing, The Board of Directors of Burcham Hills Retirement Community, The Board of Directors of the Tri County Office on Aging (Chair, 2026-2027) and the Lansing/East Lansing Smartzone Local Development Finance Authority.
