= Robert VerHeulen =

American politician

Robert J. VerHeulen

Member of the Michigan House of Representatives from the 74th district
- In office January 1, 2013 – January 9, 2019
- Preceded by: Dave Agema
- Succeeded by: Mark Huizenga

Mayor of Walker, Michigan
- In office 2001–2012
- Succeeded by: Mark Huizenga

Personal details
- Party: Republican
- Spouse: Norma
- Education: Wayne State University Law School; University of Michigan
- Occupation: Attorney, politician
- Website: State Rep. Rob VerHeulen

Robert J. VerHeulen is a Republican politician from Michigan who served in the Michigan House of Representatives. Prior to his election to the House, VerHeulen served as the mayor of Walker, Michigan. He was also an attorney for Meijer and served on several community boards and organizations.

In November 2018, VerHeulen proposed a bill to limit the powers of an incoming Democratic administration in Michigan. In the 2018 elections, Democrats obtained the governor, secretary of state and attorney general posts; Democrats last held all three positions at the same time in 1990. The bill would give greater powers to the Michigan legislature, where the Republican Party holds a majority of seats. The bill would also shift oversight of the Michigan Campaign Finance Act away from the Secretary of State to a commission.
