= Mark Huizenga =

American politician (born 1967)

Mark E. Huizenga

Member of the Michigan Senate
- Incumbent
- Assumed office November 30, 2021
- Preceded by: Peter MacGregor
- Constituency: 28th district (2021–2022); 30th district (2023– )

Member of the Michigan House of Representatives from the 74th district
- In office January 1, 2019 – November 30, 2021
- Preceded by: Robert VerHeulen
- Succeeded by: Carol Glanville

Personal details
- Born: Grand Rapids Michigan
- Party: Republican
- Spouse: Kris
- Children: Three
- Education: Calvin University; Aquinas College
- Website: www.votehuizenga.com, www.senatormarkhuizenga.com

Mark E. Huizenga (born July 21, 1967) is a Republican member of the Michigan Senate for the 30th district.

== Early life and education ==
Huizenga was born July 21, 1967, in Grand Rapids, Michigan. He has a bachelor's degree in business administration from Calvin University and a master's degree in management from Aquinas College.

== Business and city politics ==
Huizenga owns Mark Huizenga Systems Consulting, a health-care consulting firm he formed in 1997. Huizenga is a founder and managing partner for Key Green Solutions, LLC. He is a member of the American College of Medical Practice Executives.

In July 2005, Huizenga was appointed to the Walker planning commission; he remained on the planning commission until 2011. He was a city commissioner for the 2nd ward from 2011 to 2013. He was mayor from 2013 to 2018. He won election in 2013 in an uncontested, low-turnout race, in which he was endorsed by outgoing mayor Barbara Holt. He was elected to a second term in 2017, defeating longtime City Commissioner Al Parent. He opposed a ballot initiative to establish a two-year term limit for the Walker mayor and city commissioners.

== Michigan Legislature career ==
=== Elections ===
Huizenga was elected as a member of the Republican Party to the Michigan House of Representatives from District 74 in November 2018. He filled a seat previously occupied by Rob VerHeulen, who preceded him as mayor of Walker. The 74th district covered the portions of Kent County, specifically the cities of Cedar Springs, Grandville, Rockford and Walker, and the townships of Algoma, Alpine, Solon, Sparta, and Tyrone. He was re-elected in 2020.

In 2021, Huizenga was elected to the Michigan Senate in a special election in District 28, to fill the vacanct seat formerly occupied by Peter MacGregor, who resigned from the senate to become Kent County treasurer. Huizenga narrowly won the special Republican primary election in August 2021, defeating former state Representative Kevin Green, who came in second place, and state Representative Tommy Brann, who came in third place. The close primary race went to a recount, with Huizenga and Green separated by fewer than 200 votes.

District 28 was a heavily Republican district covering areas in northern and western Kent County. In the redistricting, the Michigan Independent Citizens Redistricting Commission drew Huizenga into the new District 30, a somewhat more competitive district that includes parts of Grand Rapids along with some suburban areas in Kent County (Rockford, Walker, and the townships of Grand Rapids, Ada, Cascade, Plainfield, and Alpine) and part of northern Ottawa County (Coopersville, Allendale, Marne, and Polkton Township).

In 2022, he was elected to a full term in the state Senate. In the August 2022 Republican primary election, he defeated Keith Hinkle. He won the November 2022 general election by a narrow margin, defeating Democratic nominee David LaGrand, a state representative from Grand Rapids. Huizenga received 63,754 votes (49.18%), edging LaGrand, who received 63,363 (48.88%); a Libertarian Party candidate, Theodore Petzold, received 2,516 votes (1.94%).

=== Tenure ===
In a 2013 guest column for MLive, Huizenga described himself as a "free market conservative"; in the column, he called for conservatives to lead on renewable energy, praised wind energy, and criticized fossil fuel subsidies (such as tax laws benefiting coal-fired power plants). He is a member of the leadership council of the Michigan Conservative Energy Forum.

In 2016, Huizenga supported Republican-backed legislation to prohibit local municipalities from banning plastic bags.

Huizenga was sworn in as a state senator in January 2023, at the beginning of the 102nd Michigan Legislature. In that session, Huizenga was a member of the Republican leadership team, holding the title of assistant minority whip. In 2023, Huizenga was the sole Republican to join all Democrats in support of legislation to ban "conversion therapy" in Michigan for persons under 18 years old. In 2026, Huizenga's office confirmed that he individually owned stocks in pharmaceutical manufacturers and health insurance companies, among other stocks disclosed in his personal financial disclosure.

== Personal life ==
Huizenga is Christian Reformed. He is married and has three children. His daughter Elaina Huizenga, then a college student, was appointed in 2017 to the Walker Planning Commission; the mayor did not take part in the interviews of the candidates for the Planning Commission vacancy, and recused himself from the City Commission vote to appoint Elaina Huizenga.

Political offices
Preceded by Robert VerHeulen	Michigan Representatives; 74th district 2019–2021	Succeeded by Carol Glanville
Preceded by Peter MacGregor	Michigan Senate; 28th district 2021–2022	Succeeded by Sam Singh
Preceded by Roger Victory	Michigan Senate; 30th district 2023–present	Succeeded by Incumbent
