= Grand Castle =

Multi-family residential development

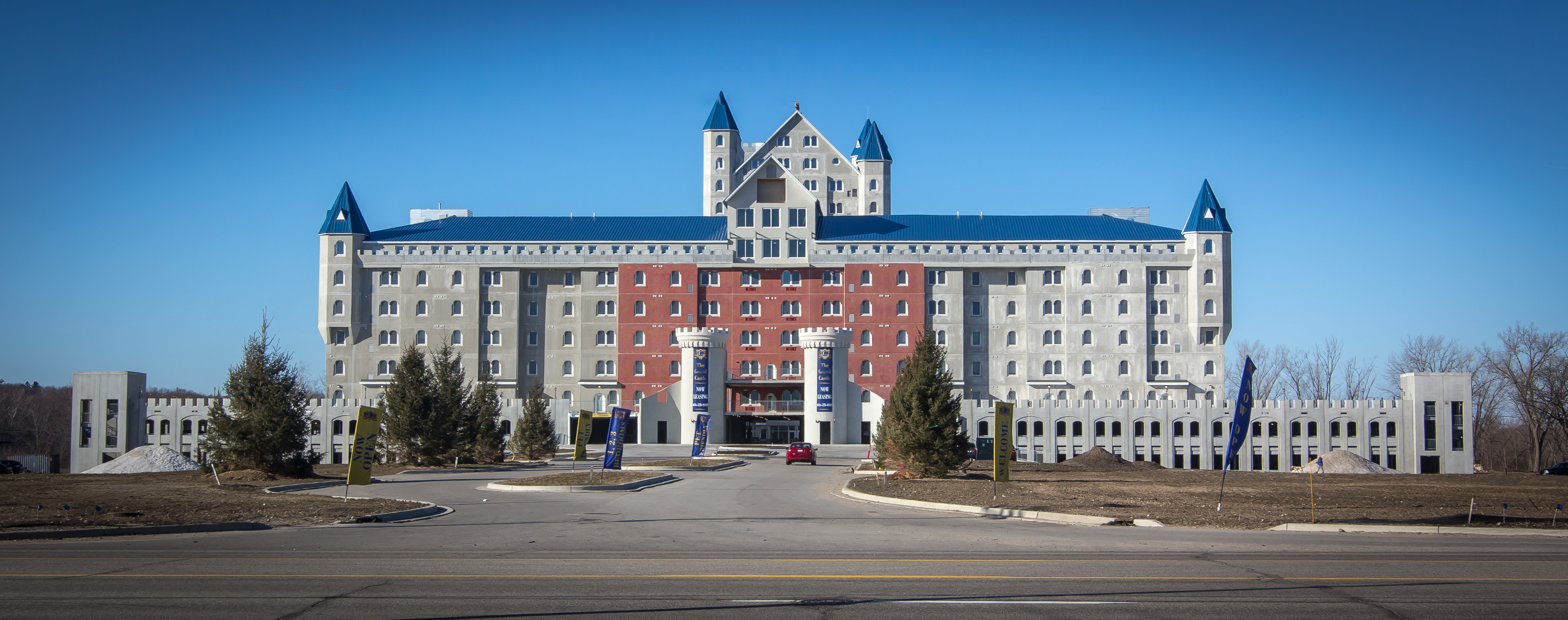

- Location within Michigan

General information
- Status: Under construction
- Type: Multi-Family Residential
- Location: 2655 Grand Castle Blvd., Grandville, Michigan, Grandville, Michigan, United States
- Coordinates: 42°54′57″N 85°45′36″W
- Construction started: April 2016
- Completed: 2018
- Opened: November 2018
- Cost: $50 million +

Height
- Height: 198 ft (60 m)

Technical details
- Floor count: 15
- Floor area: +1,000,000 sq ft (93,000 m^{2})
- Lifts/elevators: 5

Design and construction
- Architecture firm: Fugleberg Koch
- Developer: Grand Castle, LLC

Website
- www.grandcastle.com

The Grand Castle is a multi-family residential development in Grandville, Michigan with 520 apartment units. The Grand Castle's design was inspired by the Neuschwanstein Castle and it has been described as "the second largest castle structure in the world." (The largest castle in the world measured by land area is Malbork Castle in Poland).

== History ==
After years of lower building proposals in the Grand Rapids metropolitan area, proposals and new construction began to increase to some of their highest rates in 2015 and 2016. In 2015, Roger Lucas, owner of Grand Castle, LLC, and the site's developer, submitted plans to the City of Grandville, Michigan for the Grand Castle.

The site was originally developed by La Grande LLC as the LaGrande Mobile Home Park in 1957, which was one of the oldest mobile home developments in the area. LaGrande Mobile Home Park closed in 2005 to be marketed for redevelopment for highest and best use. Grand Castle LLC acquired the 23.6-acre (9.6 ha) site from La Grande LLC in May 2016 and planned for a Mixed Use Planned Unit Development (MPUD) of the Grand Castle.

In 2016, Grand Castle, LLC purchased 52-acre (21 ha) Sanford Lake, that adjoins the 23.6-acre (9.6 ha) development site. Sanford Lake was previously owned by Grand Rapids Gravel Company. Sanford Lake formed years ago when the local gravel company actively mined the area. Gravel mining operations at the location ended several years ago, making Sanford Lake a safe habitat for various species of wildlife, including ducks, geese, northern pike, largemouth bass, and many other animals.

As of August 2018, only 50 people had placed money deposits on the apartments, resulting in a less than 10% confirmed level of interest.

=== Design and construction ===
The owner, Roger Lucas, admired Neuschwanstein Castle in Germany, and said he and his family visited the Bavarian castle "at least 10 times". The original proposal for the 23.6-acre (9.6 ha) site included a 10-story building with 356 multi-family units, though the final design is larger.

Construction for the Grand Castle began in April 2016, with the castle passing the 100-foot (30 m) mark on September 13, 2016. Construction materials include, but are not limited to concrete precast walls and siding, "Red Iron" roof trusses, and steel panel roofing. The Grand Castle now houses 508 multi-family units which range from studio to three-story penthouse. There are also plans for 750 covered parking spaces, a clubhouse, a resort-style swimming pool, dog park, and a community beach with fire pits. Additional recreation activities include swimming, fishing, or kayaking at Sanford Lake, a walking trail, and other amenities.

Michigan OSHA conducted several inspections during construction. These inspections resulted in 12 violations, nine of which were "serious."

=== Proposed developments ===
Phase II of the Grand Castle's site development includes plans for an additional 104 residential units, situated in 13 carriage house buildings that contain 8 residential units each, around the Grand Castle's perimeter. In addition, Phase II includes building 64,500 square feet (5,990 m^{2}) of office and retail space along frontage on 28th Street.

=== Since opening ===
The first tenants signed their leases and moved in during November 2018. However, only the second and third floors were finished upon opening, and some amenities like the fitness centre had not been completed either.

On 21 October 2021 the Grand Castle's developer and then-owner Roger Lucas died after suffering a heart attack. In obituaries, the Grand Castle was described as Lucas' "passion project".
