= Capac, Michigan =

- Village
- Village of Capac
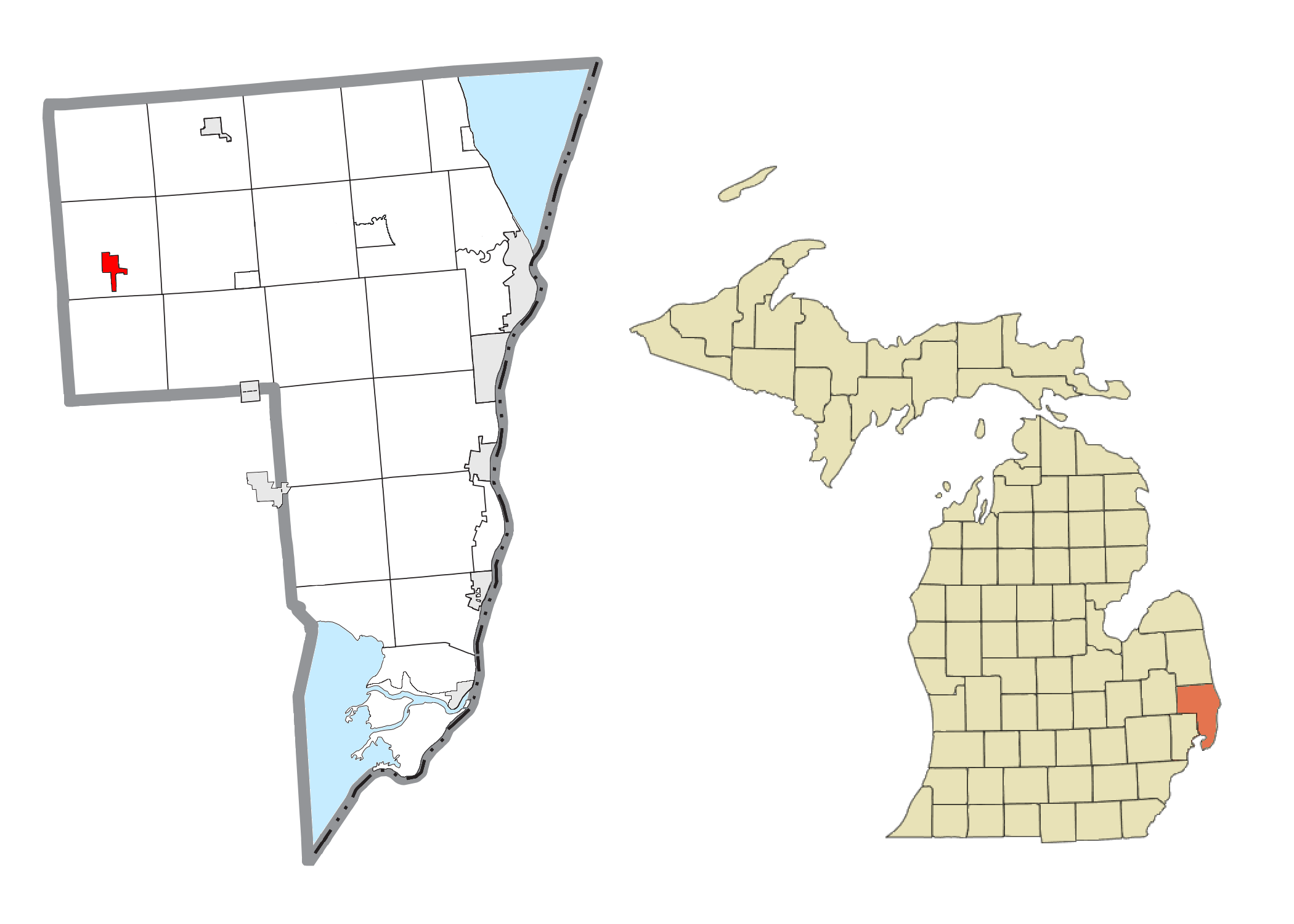
- Location within St. Clair County

- Location within the state of Michigan Location within the United States
- Coordinates: 43°00′43″N 82°55′41″W
- Country: United States
- State: Michigan
- County: St. Clair
- Township: Mussey
- Settled: 1857
- Incorporated: 1873

Government
  - Type: Village council
  - President: Debra Hlubic
  - Clerk: LeAnn Brewer
  - Manager: Travis Youatt

Area
  - Total: 1.91 sq mi (4.95 km^{2})
  - Land: 1.86 sq mi (4.81 km^{2})
  - Water: 0.050 sq mi (0.13 km^{2})
- Elevation: 814 ft (248 m)

Population (2020)
  - Total: 1,983
  - Density: 1,066.12/sq mi (411.63/km^{2})
- Time zone: UTC-5 (Eastern (EST))
  - Summer (DST): UTC-4 (EDT)
- ZIP code(s): 48014
- Area code: 810
- FIPS code: 26-13140
- GNIS feature ID: 1624440
- Website: Official website

Capac is a village in Mussey Township, St. Clair County in the U.S. state of Michigan. As of the 2020 census, Capac had a population of 1,983.

== History ==
Capac was founded and platted by a group of men from Romeo headed by George R. Funstan and Judge DeWitt C. Walker in 1857. The judge named it after Huayna Capac, Sapa Inca of the Inca Empire. A nearby post office named "Pinery" was transferred to and renamed "Capac" in January 1858. The Grand Trunk Railroad opened a station in 1866. Capac incorporated as a village in 1873.

Preston Tucker, designer of the 1948 Tucker Sedan, was born near Capac in 1903. Tucker is the subject of the 1988 movie Tucker: The Man and His Dream.

Roman Gribbs, mayor of Detroit from 1970 to 1974, was raised near Capac.

== Geography ==
According to the United States Census Bureau, the village has a total area of 1.88 square miles (4.87 km^{2}), of which 1.83 square miles (4.74 km^{2}) is land and 0.05 square miles (0.13 km^{2}) is water.

== Demographics ==
Historical population
Census	Pop.	Note	%±
1880	544		—
1900	547		—
1910	761		39.1%
1920	791		3.9%
1930	837		5.8%
1940	920		9.9%
1950	1,104		20.0%
1960	1,235		11.9%
1970	1,279		3.6%
1980	1,377		7.7%
1990	1,583		15.0%
2000	1,775		12.1%
2010	1,890		6.5%
2020	1,983		4.9%
U.S. Decennial Census

=== 2020 census ===
As of the 2020 census, Capac had a population of 1,983. The median age was 36.7 years. 26.0% of residents were under the age of 18 and 14.4% of residents were 65 years of age or older. For every 100 females there were 95.8 males, and for every 100 females age 18 and over there were 93.7 males age 18 and over.

0.0% of residents lived in urban areas, while 100.0% lived in rural areas.

There were 778 households in Capac, of which 34.6% had children under the age of 18 living in them. Of all households, 44.0% were married-couple households, 18.5% were households with a male householder and no spouse or partner present, and 26.6% were households with a female householder and no spouse or partner present. About 26.3% of all households were made up of individuals and 10.6% had someone living alone who was 65 years of age or older.

There were 837 housing units, of which 7.0% were vacant. The homeowner vacancy rate was 2.0% and the rental vacancy rate was 5.2%.

Racial composition as of the 2020 census
Race	Number	Percent
White	1,640	82.7%
Black or African American	3	0.2%
American Indian and Alaska Native	19	1.0%
Asian	5	0.3%
Native Hawaiian and Other Pacific Islander	0	0.0%
Some other race	125	6.3%
Two or more races	191	9.6%
Hispanic or Latino (of any race)	351	17.7%

=== 2010 census ===
As of the census of 2010, there were 1,890 people, 704 households, and 470 families living in the village. The population density was 1,032.8 inhabitants per square mile (398.8/km^{2}). There were 807 housing units at an average density of 441.0 per square mile (170.3/km^{2}). The racial makeup of the village was 87.7% White, 0.3% African American, 0.6% Native American, 0.1% Asian, 8.0% from other races, and 3.2% from two or more races. Hispanic or Latino of any race were 18.9% of the population.

There were 704 households, of which 40.1% had children under the age of 18 living with them, 45.6% were married couples living together, 13.8% had a female householder with no husband present, 7.4% had a male householder with no wife present, and 33.2% were non-families. 27.7% of all households were made up of individuals, and 11.7% had someone living alone who was 65 years of age or older. The average household size was 2.68 and the average family size was 3.30.

The median age in the village was 33.1 years. 29% of residents were under the age of 18; 11% were between the ages of 18 and 24; 25.4% were from 25 to 44; 24% were from 45 to 64; and 10.5% were 65 years of age or older. The gender makeup of the village was 48.1% male and 51.9% female.

=== 2000 census ===
As of the census of 2000, there were 1,775 people, 620 households, and 465 families living in the village. The population density was 1,096.5 inhabitants per square mile (423.4/km^{2}). There were 652 housing units at an average density of 402.8 per square mile (155.5/km^{2}). The racial makeup of the village was 91.49% White, 0.39% African American, 1.07% Native American, 5.01% from other races, and 2.03% from two or more races. Hispanic or Latino of any race were 16.45% of the population.

There were 620 households, out of which 45.3% had children under the age of 18 living with them, 56.8% were married couples living together, 12.6% had a female householder with no husband present, and 25.0% were non-families. 21.5% of all households were made up of individuals, and 11.1% had someone living alone who was 65 years of age or older. The average household size was 2.86 and the average family size was 3.33.

In the village, the population was spread out, with 33.2% under the age of 18, 9.7% from 18 to 24, 31.4% from 25 to 44, 16.7% from 45 to 64, and 8.9% who were 65 years of age or older. The median age was 30 years. For every 100 females, there were 98.3 males. For every 100 females age 18 and over, there were 94.6 males.

The median income for a household in the village was $42,105, and the median income for a family was $47,727. Males had a median income of $40,739 versus $26,797 for females. The per capita income for the village was $16,297. About 8.1% of families and 10.9% of the population were below the poverty line, including 14.0% of those under age 18 and 3.9% of those age 65 or over.
