= Mussey Township, Michigan =

- Civil township
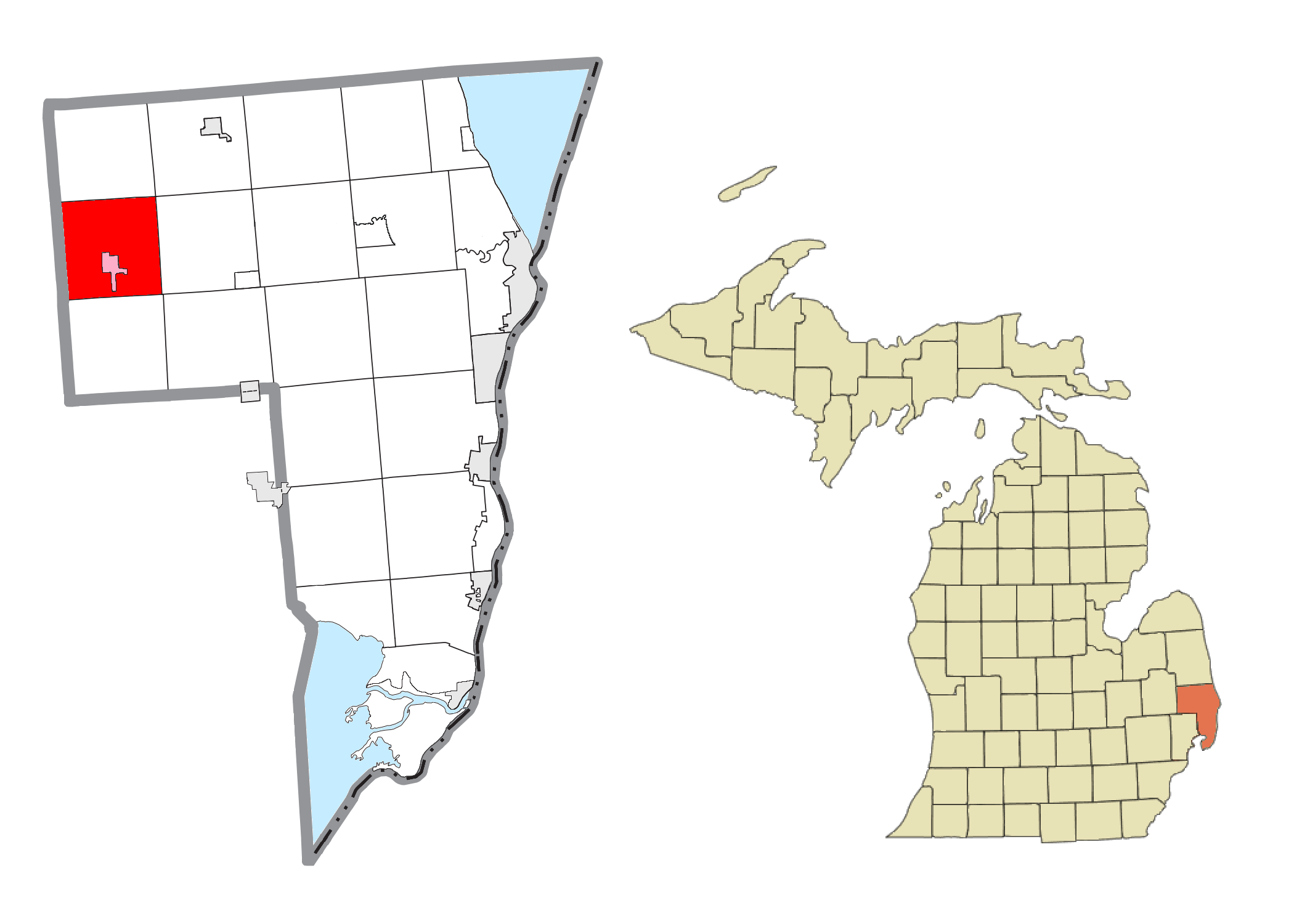
- Location within St. Clair County (red) and the administered village of Capac (pink)

- Location within the state of Michigan Location within the United States
- Coordinates: 43°00′48″N 82°55′41″W
- Country: United States
- State: Michigan
- County: St. Clair
- Established: 1855

Government
  - Supervisor: Bruce Downey
  - Clerk: Monica Standel

Area
  - Total: 35.88 sq mi (92.93 km^{2})
  - Land: 35.68 sq mi (92.41 km^{2})
  - Water: 0.20 sq mi (0.52 km^{2})
- Elevation: 827 ft (252 m)

Population (2020)
  - Total: 4,234
  - Density: 118.7/sq mi (45.8/km^{2})
- Time zone: UTC-5 (Eastern (EST))
  - Summer (DST): UTC-4 (EDT)
- ZIP code(s): 48002 (Allenton); 48014 (Capac)
- Area code: 810
- FIPS code: 26-56380
- GNIS feature ID: 1626786
- Website: Official website

Mussey Township is a civil township of St. Clair County in the U.S. state of Michigan. The population was 4,234 at the 2020 Census.

The village of Capac is located within the township.

When the township was organized in 1855, it was named for Dexter Mussey, a member of the Michigan House of Representatives from Macomb County and later Speaker of the House.

== Geography ==
According to the United States Census Bureau, the township has a total area of 36.0 square miles (93.2 km^{2}), all land.

== Demographics ==
As of the census of 2000, there were 3,740 people, 1,284 households, and 1,005 families residing in the township. The population density was 104.0 inhabitants per square mile (40.2/km^{2}). There were 1,346 housing units at an average density of 37.4 per square mile (14.4/km^{2}). The racial makeup of the township was 93.88% White, 0.19% African American, 0.72% Native American, 0.27% Asian, 3.66% from other races, and 1.28% from two or more races. Hispanic or Latino of any race were 9.81% of the population.

There were 1,284 households, out of which 42.3% had children under the age of 18 living with them, 64.0% were married couples living together, 9.2% had a female householder with no husband present, and 21.7% were non-families. 18.6% of all households were made up of individuals, and 8.3% had someone living alone who was 65 years of age or older. The average household size was 2.91 and the average family size was 3.33.

In the township the population was spread out, with 31.5% under the age of 18, 8.7% from 18 to 24, 30.5% from 25 to 44, 20.8% from 45 to 64, and 8.6% who were 65 years of age or older. The median age was 33 years. For every 100 females, there were 103.5 males. For every 100 females age 18 and over, there were 100.9 males.

The median income for a household in the township was $46,618, and the median income for a family was $51,855. Males had a median income of $42,500 versus $26,068 for females. The per capita income for the township was $18,568. About 6.4% of families and 7.5% of the population were below the poverty line, including 8.6% of those under age 18 and 4.4% of those age 65 or over.
