= Peter MacGregor (Michigan politician) =

American politician

Kent County Treasurer
- Incumbent
- Assumed office January 1, 2021
- Preceded by: Ken Parrish

Member of the Michigan Senate from the 28th district
- In office January 1, 2015 – December 31, 2020
- Preceded by: Mark Jansen
- Succeeded by: Mark Huizenga

Member of the Michigan House of Representatives from the 73rd district
- In office January 1, 2011 – January 1, 2015
- Preceded by: Tom Pearce
- Succeeded by: Chris Afendoulis

Personal details
- Born: February 24, 1966 (age 60) Detroit, Michigan
- Party: Republican
- Spouse: Christine
- Education: Michigan State University
- Website: State Rep. Peter MacGregor

Peter F. MacGregor (born February 24, 1966) is a Republican politician from Michigan currently serving as the Kent County Treasurer. He previously served in the Michigan Senate representing the 28th district and also was a former member of the Michigan House of Representatives representing northern Kent County. He is also a former trustee, planning commissioner, and supervisor of Cannon Township.

A graduate of the Eli Broad College of Business at Michigan State University, MacGregor is a former small business owner and is involved in several local organizations.

MacGregor announced his intention to run for the Michigan Senate in 2014 to replace Mark Jansen who could not run again due to term limits. He won in both 2014 and his 2018 reelection campaign.

In 2020, MacGregor stepped down to become Kent County Treasurer.
