= Tommy Brann =

American politician (born 1951)

Member of the Michigan House of Representatives from the 77th district
- In office January 1, 2017 – December 31, 2022
- Preceded by: Thomas Hooker
- Succeeded by: Emily Dievendorf

Personal details
- Born: December 23, 1951 (age 74) Grand Rapids, Michigan
- Party: Republican
- Spouse: Sue Brann
- Parent: John Brann (father)
- Occupation: Restaurant businessman, politician

Tommy Brann (born December 23, 1951) is an American politician from Michigan. Brann is a Republican member of Michigan House of Representatives from District 77.

== Early life ==
Thomas Michael Brann was born on December 23, 1951. Brann's father is John Brann, a former restaurateur. He graduated from East Grand Rapids High School. He is a third-generation resident of Kent County. He is of Irish Descent.

== Career ==
Brann is the owner of Brann's Steakhouse and Grille. At 19, Brann started his first restaurant business. Brann is the author of Mind Your Own Business. After Michael Moore and Seth Rogen criticized the film American Sniper, Brann banned the two from visiting his restaurants, describing their criticism as "hateful" against the United States Armed Forces and military sniper Chris Kyle, who was portrayed in the film.

=== Political career ===
On November 6, 2016, Brann won the election and became a Republican member of Michigan House of Representatives for District 77. Brann defeated Dana Knight. In 2018 and 2020, as an incumbent, Brann won the reelection served House District 77.

On October 10, 2021, Brann co-sponsored House Bill 5444.

Brann supported U.S. Representative Peter Meijer during the District 3 House of Representatives elections in 2022. In the 2022 Michigan Senate election, Brann was defeated by Winnie Brinks in a race for representing Michigan's 29th Senate district.

== Personal life ==
Brann is married to Sue Brann for 50 years, whom he met through his restaurant, according to his website. He describes himself as an Independent Republican.

== See also ==
- 2016 Michigan House of Representatives election
- 2018 Michigan House of Representatives election
