= Grandville, Michigan =

City in Michigan, United States

- City
- City of Grandville
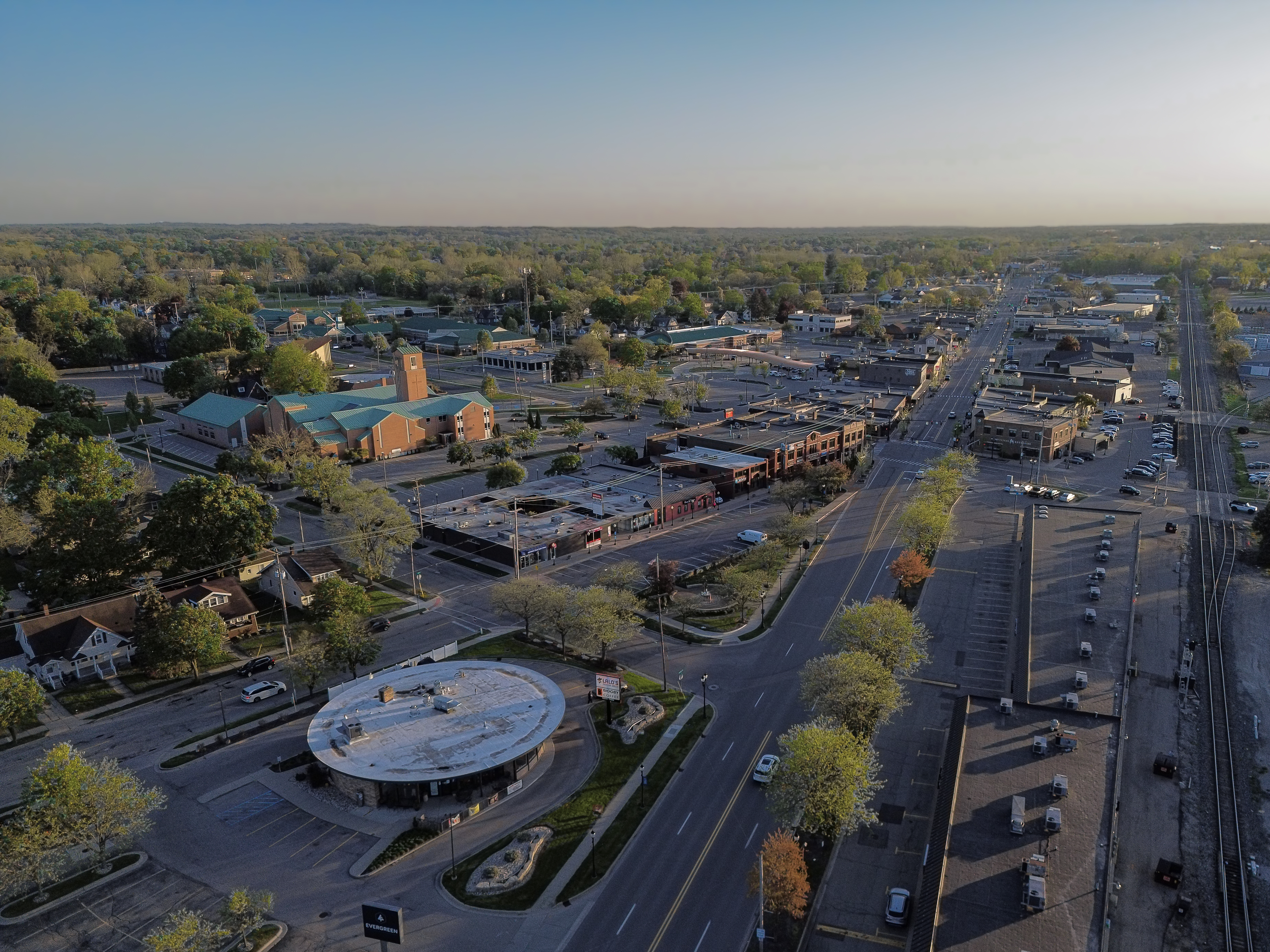
- Aerial view of Grandville

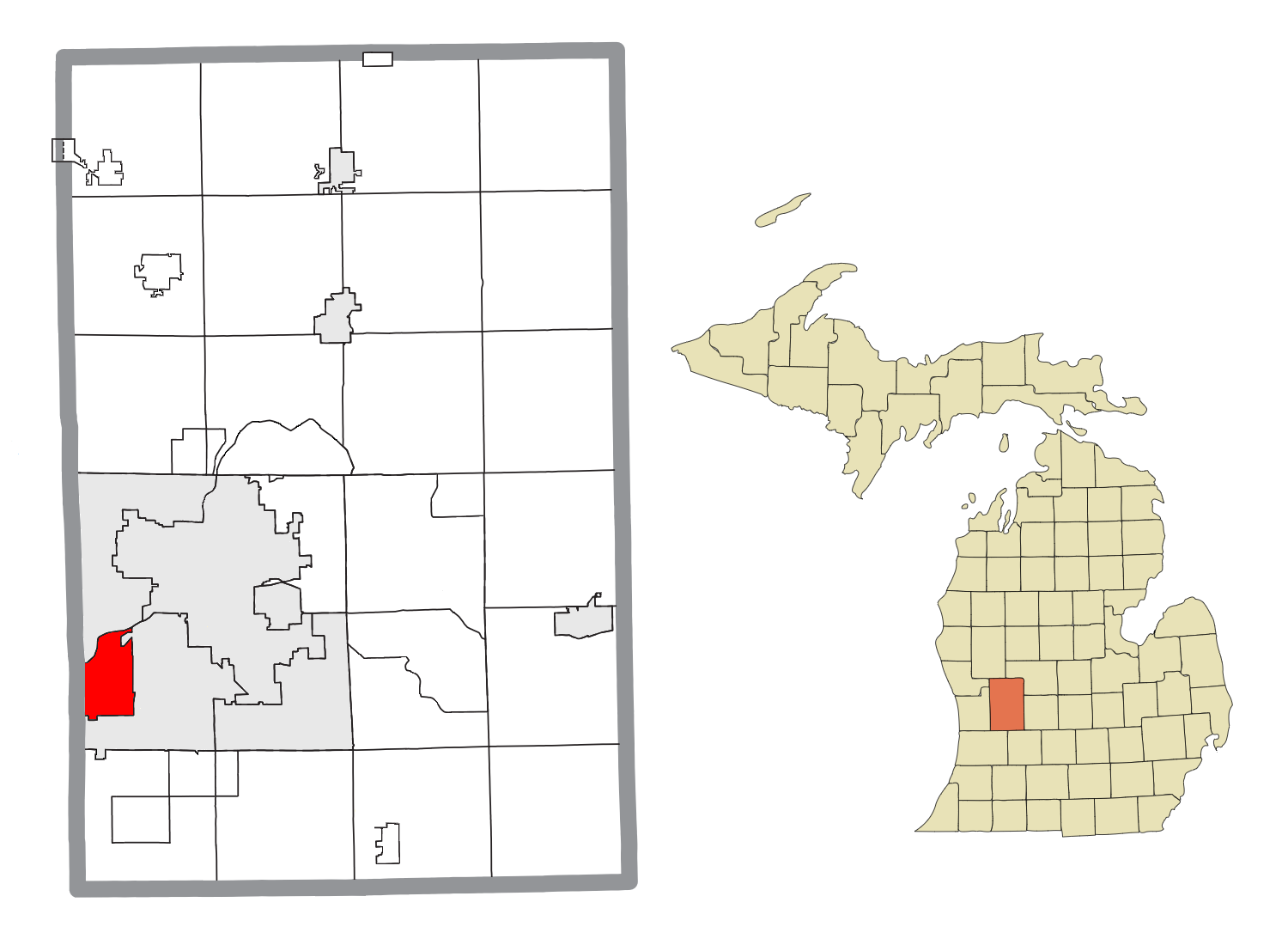
- Location within Kent County

- Location within the state of Michigan Location within the United States
- Coordinates: 42°54′01″N 85°45′23″W
- Country: United States
- State: Michigan
- County: Kent
- Settled: 1833
- Incorporated: 1933

Government
  - Type: Mayor–council
  - Mayor: Steve Maas
  - Clerk: Marci Poley-Kwiatkowski
  - Manager: Ken Krombeen

Area
  - Total: 7.68 sq mi (19.88 km^{2})
  - Land: 7.25 sq mi (18.77 km^{2})
  - Water: 0.43 sq mi (1.11 km^{2})
- Elevation: 614 ft (187 m)

Population (2020)
  - Total: 16,083
  - Density: 2,219.2/sq mi (856.85/km^{2})
- Time zone: UTC-5 (Eastern (EST))
  - Summer (DST): UTC-4 (EDT)
- ZIP code(s): 49418, 49468
- Area code: 616
- FIPS code: 26-34160
- GNIS feature ID: 1626375
- Website: Official website

Grandville is a city in Kent County in the U.S. state of Michigan. The population was 16,083 according to the 2020 census.

Grandville is just southwest of the city of Grand Rapids and is part of the Grand Rapids metropolitan area. It was first settled in 1833 and later incorporated as a city in 1933.

== History ==
=== Settlement ===
Anishinaabe peoples are indigenous to the Grand Rapids metropolitan area. Grandville was geographically an important place during the logging years in Michigan's history due to its location at the "river-bend" of the Grand River. It was important to have people there to make sure the logs did not jam up as the river turned north-west toward Grand Haven.

Grandville was founded in 1833 and incorporated as a city in 1933.

=== Recent history ===
By the 1980s due to the growth of the Grand Rapids metropolitan area following the early 1980s recession in the United States, Grandville began to experience even more growth. In 1987, color measurement and manufacturer X-Rite established its headquarters in the city a year after it went public, soon becoming one of the fastest growing businesses in Michigan.

In the 1990s, the city was being eyed for larger development. In 1990, developers explored the building of a new mall near the intersection of 44th Street and Ivanrest and eventually met with the city for approval. In 1999, construction was completed on RiverTown Crossings, a mall with just over 1.25 million square feet of retail space.

In the 2000s, Grandville experienced continued growth following the opening of Rivertown Crossings, including multiple restaurants and strip malls along Rivertown Parkway. It had grown to be one of the city's largest employers. However, by 2007, the beginning of the Great Recession, X-Rite had moved its headquarters nearby to Kentwood.

A new fire station was constructed across the street from city hall at Prairie and Wilson in 2000 to make way for a new police station and hall of justice in 2003 next to city hall and a Kent District Library on Wilson Avenue.

In 2013, a Cabela's and Target anchored a new development on the former X-Rite property. In 2016, a 1 million+ square foot, 400 unit apartment development called the Grand Castle was constructed.

In 2017, after arriving in Grand Rapids, then United States Vice President Mike Pence and his wife Karen made a visit for the annual Fourth of July ceremony and parade. Pence walked the traditional parade route of Wilson Avenue, from 44th Street to Chicago Drive. During the parade, citizens held signs in a peaceful protest. Pence tweeted after the visit thanking Grandville for the parade. Mayor Steve Maas responded with a letter.

== Geography ==
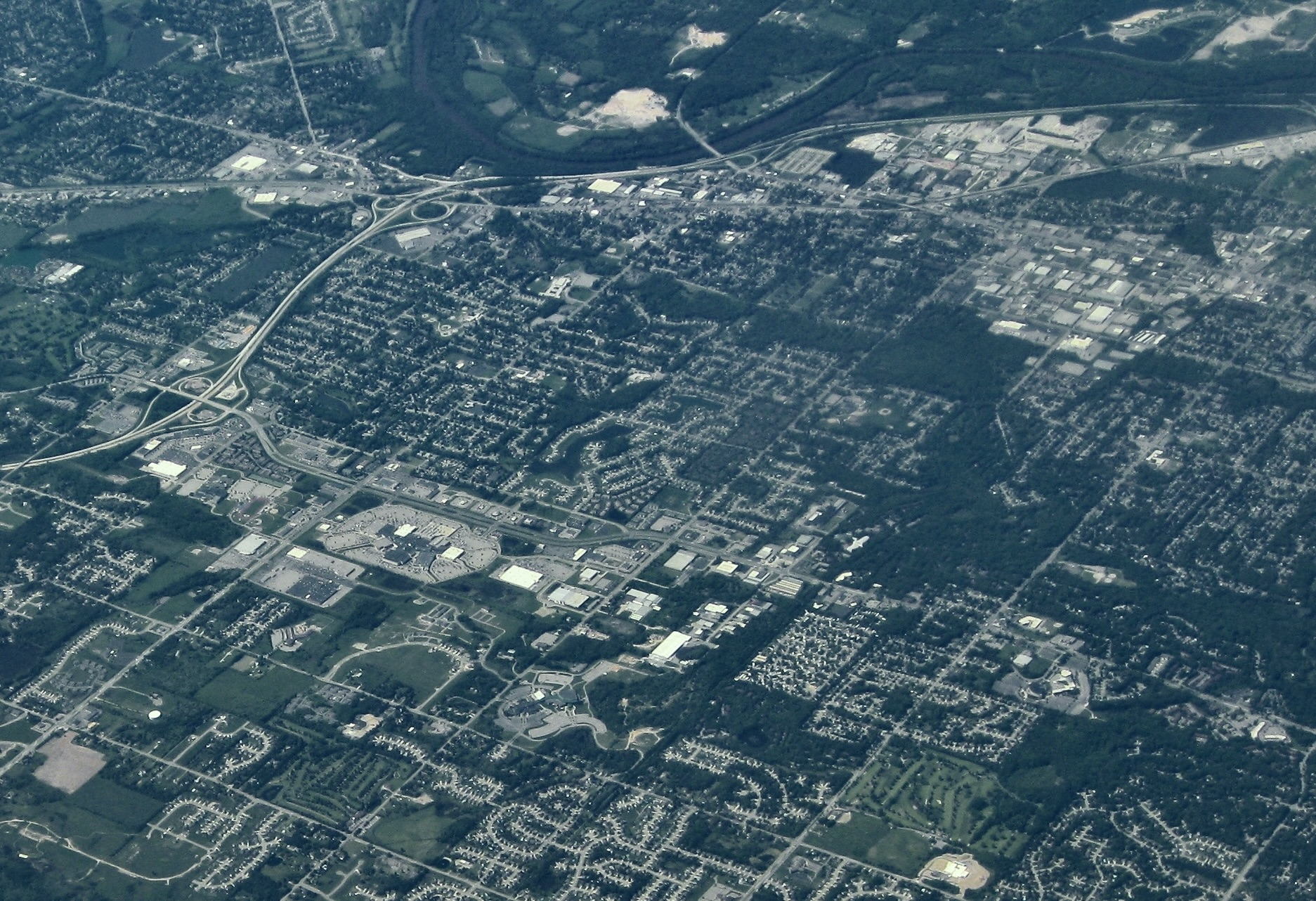
Aerial photograph of Grandville in 2009

According to the U.S. Census Bureau, the city has a total area of 7.67 square miles (19.87 km^{2}), of which 7.25 square miles (18.78 km^{2}) is land and 0.43 square miles (1.11 km^{2}) (5.93%) is water.

The Grand River forms the northern border of the city, and the city of Grand Rapids is just to the northeast, while Walker is to the north and Wyoming surrounds the city on the east and south. Ottawa County is to the west.

=== Major highways ===
- I-196 (Gerald R. Ford Freeway) run through Grandville near the north and west portions of the city.
- M-11 (28th Street) runs west–east through the northern portion of the city.
- M-121 (Chicago Drive) has its western terminus at I-196 at the western border of the city.

== Demographics ==
Historical population
Census	Pop.	Note	%±
1880	548		—
1900	457		—
1910	680		48.8%
1920	799		17.5%
1930	1,346		68.5%
1940	1,566		16.3%
1950	2,022		29.1%
1960	7,975		294.4%
1970	10,764		35.0%
1980	12,412		15.3%
1990	15,624		25.9%
2000	16,263		4.1%
2010	15,378		−5.4%
2020	16,083		4.6%
U.S. Decennial Census

=== 2020 census ===
As of the 2020 census, Grandville had a population of 16,083. The median age was 36.8 years. 21.7% of residents were under the age of 18 and 17.4% of residents were 65 years of age or older. For every 100 females there were 93.3 males, and for every 100 females age 18 and over there were 91.4 males age 18 and over.

100.0% of residents lived in urban areas, while 0.0% lived in rural areas.

There were 6,483 households in Grandville, of which 28.7% had children under the age of 18 living in them. Of all households, 49.9% were married-couple households, 17.3% were households with a male householder and no spouse or partner present, and 26.3% were households with a female householder and no spouse or partner present. About 27.2% of all households were made up of individuals and 10.2% had someone living alone who was 65 years of age or older.

There were 6,835 housing units, of which 5.1% were vacant. The homeowner vacancy rate was 0.5% and the rental vacancy rate was 10.1%.

Racial composition as of the 2020 census
Race	Number	Percent
White	13,425	83.5%
Black or African American	595	3.7%
American Indian and Alaska Native	83	0.5%
Asian	323	2.0%
Native Hawaiian and Other Pacific Islander	8	0.0%
Some other race	428	2.7%
Two or more races	1,221	7.6%
Hispanic or Latino (of any race)	1,228	7.6%

=== 2010 census ===
As of the census of 2010, there were 15,378 people, 5,982 households, and 4,160 families residing in the city. The population density was 2,115.3 inhabitants per square mile (816.7/km^{2}).

There were 6,276 housing units at an average density of 863.3 per square mile (333.3/km^{2}). The racial makeup of the city was 92.0% White, 2.2% African American, 0.2% Native American, 1.5% Asian, 1.8% from other races, and 2.4% from two or more races. Hispanic or Latino of any race were 6.2% of the population. There were 5,982 households, of which 33.5% had children under the age of 18 living with them, 54.5% were married couples living together, 11.0% had a female householder with no husband present, 4.1% had a male householder with no wife present, and 30.5% were non-families. 24.9% of all households were made up of individuals, and 10.2% had someone living alone who was 65 years of age or older. The average household size was 2.54 and the average family size was 3.06.

The median age in the city was 36.3 years. 24.8% of residents were under the age of 18; 9.7% were between the ages of 18 and 24; 25.3% were from 25 to 44; 25.6% were from 45 to 64; and 14.6% were 65 years of age or older. The gender makeup of the city was 48.3% male and 51.7% female.

=== 2000 census ===
At the 2000 census, there were 16,263 people, 6,095 households, and 4,370 families residing in the city. The population density was 2,195.6 inhabitants per square mile (847.7/km^{2}). There were 6,279 housing units at an average density of 847.7 per square mile (327.3/km^{2}). The racial makeup of the city was 94.94% White, 1.40% African American, 0.26% Native American, 1.16% Asian, 0.02% Pacific Islander, 0.87% from other races, and 1.34% from two or more races. Hispanic or Latino of any race were 3.08% of the population.

There were 6,095 households, out of which 37.0% had children under the age of 18 living with them, 58.9% were married couples living together, 9.8% had a female householder with no husband present, and 28.3% were non-families. 22.8% of all households were made up of individuals, and 8.4% had someone living alone who was 65 years of age or older. The average household size was 2.64 and the average family size was 3.13.

In the city the population was spread out, with 27.9% under the age of 18, 10.6% from 18 to 24, 28.0% from 25 to 44, 20.8% from 45 to 64, and 12.8% who were 65 years of age or older. The median age was 34 years. For every 100 females there were 94.7 males. For every 100 females age 18 and over, there were 90.2 males.

The median income for a household in the city was $47,570, and the median income for a family was $55,047. Males had a median income of $41,619 versus $26,350 for females. The per capita income for the city was $21,306. About 3.2% of families and 4.5% of the population were below the poverty line, including 3.7% of those under age 18 and 4.2% of those age 65 or over.

== Government ==
Grandville operates under a council-manager form of government. Ken Krombeen, the city manager, is appointed by the city council to act as the executive of the city, overseeing all departments. The council is composed of six members and a mayor, all elected at large. The Mayor holds a largely ceremonial role, having no veto authority. Three members of the council are elected every two years.

== Notable people ==
- David Agema, Michigan state representative
- Devin Booker, professional basketball player
- Allyssa DeHaan, collegiate basketball player
- Brent Gates, professional baseball player
- Hai Du Lam, professional League of Legends player
- Terri Lynn Land, former Michigan Secretary of State
- Buster Mathis Jr., professional boxer
- Benny McCoy, professional baseball player
- Walshy, professional esports player
