= Michigan Senate =

Upper house of the Michigan Legislature

Michigan State Senate
- Michigan Legislature

Type
- Type: Upper house of the Michigan Legislature
- Term limits: 3 terms (12 years)

History
- Founded: January 26, 1837
- Preceded by: Michigan Territorial Council
- New session started: January 8, 2025

Leadership
- President: Garlin Gilchrist (D) since January 1, 2019
- President pro tempore: Jeremy Moss (D) since January 11, 2023
- Majority Leader: Winnie Brinks (D) since January 1, 2023
- Minority Leader: Aric Nesbitt (R) since January 11, 2023

Structure
- Seats: 38 voting members
- Political groups: Majority: Democratic (20); Minority: Republican (18)
- Length of term: 4 years
- Authority: Article IV, Michigan Constitution
- Salary: $71,685 salary/year + $10,800 per diem/year

Elections
- Last election: November 8, 2022 (38 seats)
- Next election: November 3, 2026 (38 seats)
- Redistricting: Michigan Independent Citizens Redistricting Commission

Motto
- In God We Trust

Meeting place
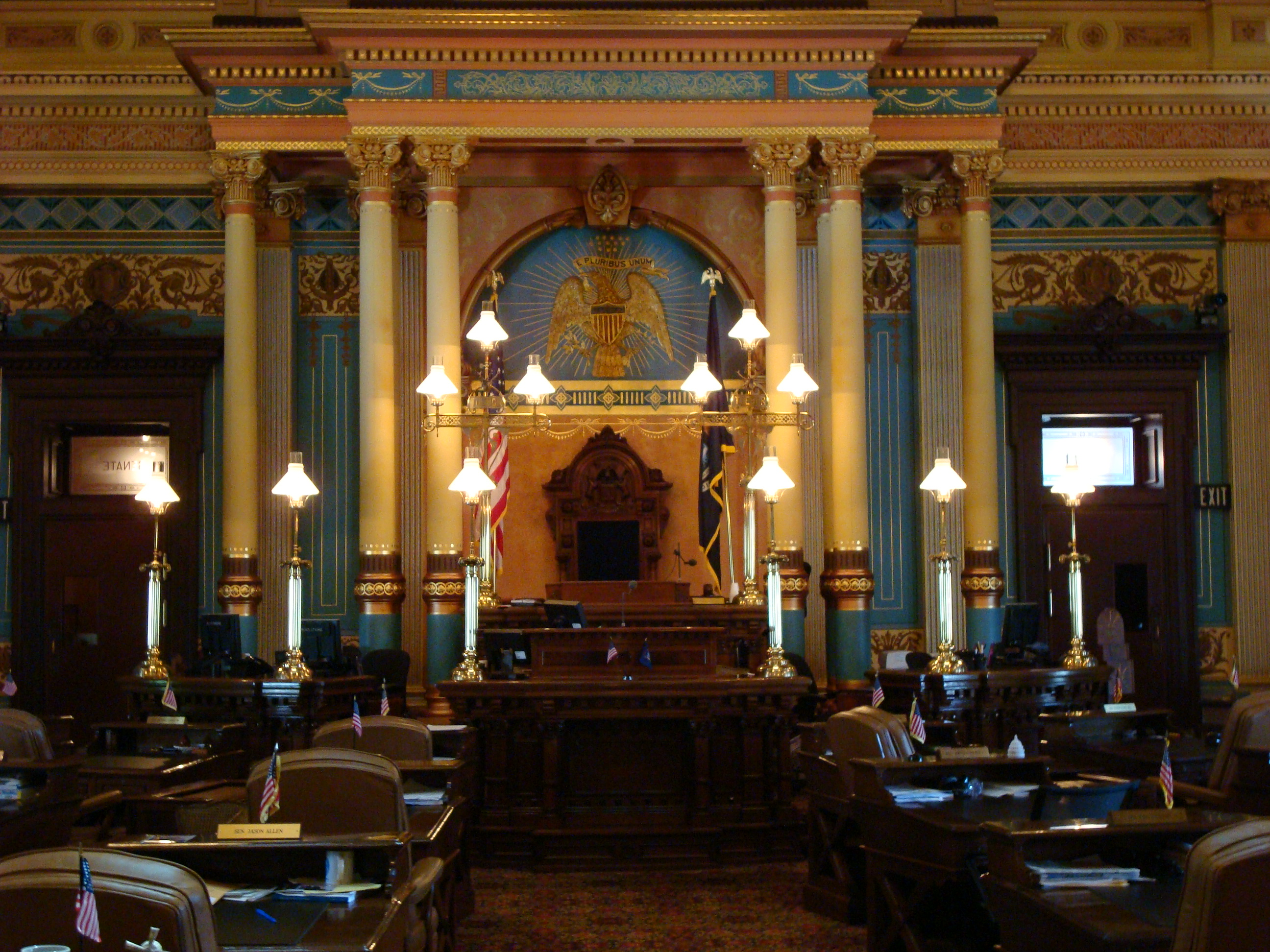
- State Senate Chamber; Michigan State Capitol; Lansing, Michigan

Website
- senate.michigan.gov

The Michigan Senate is the upper house of the Michigan Legislature. Along with the Michigan House of Representatives, it composes the state legislature, which has powers, roles and duties defined by Article IV of the Michigan Constitution, adopted in 1963. The primary purpose of the Legislature is to enact new laws and amend or repeal existing laws.

The Michigan Senate is composed of 38 members, each elected from a single-member district with a population of between approximately 212,400 to 263,500 residents. Legislative districts are drawn on the basis of population figures, provided by the federal decennial census. In January 2023, Democrats took the majority with 20 seats to Republicans' 18 seats. The Senate chamber is located in the State Capitol building.

== Titles ==
Members of the Michigan Senate are called senators. Because this shadows the terminology used to describe members of the United States Senate, constituents and the news media, using The Associated Press Stylebook, often refer to members of the Michigan Senate as state senators when necessary to avoid confusion with their federal counterparts.

== Terms ==
Senators are elected on a partisan basis for four-year terms, concurrent with the election of the Governor of Michigan. Terms for senators begin on January 1 at noon, following the November general election and end on January 1 when their replacements are sworn in.

Senate elections are always held two years after the election for President of the United States, with the next election scheduled for November 5, 2030.

== Term limits ==
On November 3, 1992, almost 59 percent of Michigan voters backed Proposal B, the Michigan Term Limits Amendment, which amended the state constitution, to enact term limits on federal and state officials. In 1995, the U.S. Supreme Court ruled that states could not enact congressional term limits, but ruled that the state-level term limits remain. Under the amendment, a person could be elected to the state senate two times. A provision governing partial terms was also included. These provisions became Article IV, section 54 and Article V, section 30 of the Michigan Constitution. On November 8, 2022, nearly 2 in 3 voters approved Proposal 1, limiting state legislators to 12 years combined in either chamber of the legislature, but incumbent senators re-elected in 2022 would remain eligible for their new terms even if it pushed them over the 12-year limit and newly elected senators would similarly be eligible for a second term in 2026 regardless of previous legislative service.

== Qualifications ==
Each senator must be a citizen of the United States, at least 21 years of age, and an elector of the district they represent. Under state law, moving out of the district shall be deemed a vacation of the office. No person who has been convicted of subversion or who has within the preceding 20 years been convicted of a felony involving a breach of public trust shall be eligible for either house of the legislature.

== Legislative session ==
For reckoning periods of time during which the legislature operates, each two-year period coinciding with the election of new members of the House of Representatives is numbered consecutively as a legislature, dating to the first legislature following Michigan's admission as a state. The current two-year term of the legislature (January 1, 2025 – December 31, 2026) is the 103rd Legislature.

Each year during which the legislature meets constitutes a new legislative session. According to Article IV Section 13 of the State Constitution, a new session of the legislature begins when the members of each house convene, on the second Wednesday of January every year at noon. A regular session of the legislature typically lasts throughout the entire year with several periods of recess and adjourns sine die in late December.

The Michigan legislature is one of ten full-time state legislative bodies in the United States. Members receive a base salary of $71,685 per year, which makes them the fourth-highest paid state legislators in the country, after California, Pennsylvania and New York. While legislators in many states receive per diems that make up for lower salaries, Michigan legislators receive $10,800 per year for session and interim expenses. Salaries and expense allowances are determined by the State Officers Compensation Commission.

Any legislation pending in either chamber at the end of a session that is not the end of a legislative term of office continues and carries over to the next legislative session.

== Powers and process ==
The Michigan legislature is authorized by the Michigan Constitution to create and amend the laws of the U.S. state of Michigan, subject to the governor's power to veto legislation. To do so, legislators propose legislation in the forms of bills drafted by a nonpartisan, professional staff. Successful legislation must undergo committee review, three readings on the floor of each house, with appropriate voting majorities, as required, and either be signed into law by the governor or enacted through a veto override approved by two-thirds of the membership of each legislative house.

== Composition ==
Affiliation	Party (Shading indicates majority caucus)		Total	
Affiliation	Republican	Democratic	Total	Vacant
End of Previous Legislature	22	16	38	0
Begin Legislature (2023)	18	20	38	0
January 3, 2025	18	19	37	1
May 21, 2026	18	20	38	0
Latest voting share	47.4%	52.6%		

=== Leadership ===
The Michigan Senate is headed by the Lieutenant Governor of Michigan, who serves as President of the Senate but may cast a vote only in the instance of a tie. The presiding officers of the senate, apart from the president, are elected by the body at its first session and serve until their term of office is up. Majority and minority party officers are elected at the same time by their respective caucuses.

The senate majority leader controls the assignment of committees and leadership positions, along with control of the agenda in the chamber.

==== Majority ====
- President: Garlin Gilchrist (D)
- President Pro Tempore: Jeremy Moss (D)
- Majority Leader: Winnie Brinks (D)
- Assistant President Pro Tempore: Erika Geiss (D)
- Associate President Pro Tempore: John Daniel Cherry (D)
- Assistant Majority Leader: Darrin Camilleri (D)
- Majority Floor Leader: Sam Singh (D)
- Assistant Majority Floor Leader: Jeff Irwin (D)
- Majority Caucus Chairperson: Dayna Polehanki (D)
- Assistant Majority Caucus Chairperson: Veronica Klinefelt (D)
- Majority Whip: Mallory McMorrow (D)
- Assistant Majority Whip: Mary Cavanagh (D)

==== Minority ====
- Minority Leader of the Michigan Senate: Aric Nesbitt (R)
- Assistant Minority Leader: Rick Outman (R)
- Minority Floor Leader: Dan Lauwers (R)
- Assistant Minority Floor Leader: Lana Theis (R)
- Minority Caucus Chair: Kevin Daley (R)
- Assistant Minority Caucus Chair: Jim Runestad (R)
- Minority Whip: Roger Victory (R)
- Assistant Minority Whip: Mark Huizenga (R)

== Members, 2023–2026 ==
Senate districts and party affiliation as of May 2026

District	Name	Party	Residence	Start	Term Limited
1	Erika Geiss	Dem	Taylor	January 1, 2019	Yes
2	Sylvia Santana	Dem	Detroit	January 1, 2019	Yes
3	Stephanie Chang	Dem	Detroit	January 1, 2019	Yes
4	Darrin Camilleri	Dem	Brownstown	January 1, 2023	No
5	Dayna Polehanki	Dem	Livonia	January 1, 2019	No
6	Mary Cavanagh	Dem	Redford	January 1, 2023	No
7	Jeremy Moss	Dem	Southfield	January 1, 2019	Yes
8	Mallory McMorrow	Dem	Royal Oak	January 1, 2019	No
9	Michael Webber	Rep	Rochester Hills	January 1, 2023	No
10	Paul Wojno	Dem	Warren	January 1, 2019	Yes
11	Veronica Klinefelt	Dem	Eastpointe	January 1, 2023	No
12	Kevin Hertel	Dem	St. Clair Shores	January 1, 2023	No
13	Rosemary Bayer	Dem	Beverly Hills	January 1, 2019	No
14	Sue Shink	Dem	Ann Arbor	January 1, 2023	No
15	Jeff Irwin	Dem	Ann Arbor	January 1, 2019	Yes
16	Joe Bellino	Rep	Monroe	January 1, 2023	No
17	Jonathan Lindsey	Rep	Bronson	January 1, 2023	No
18	Thomas Albert	Rep	Lowell	January 1, 2023	No
19	Sean McCann	Dem	Kalamazoo	January 1, 2019	Yes
20	Aric Nesbitt	Rep	Porter Township	January 1, 2019	Yes
21	Sarah Anthony	Dem	Lansing	January 1, 2023	No
22	Lana Theis	Rep	Brighton Township	January 1, 2019	Yes
23	Jim Runestad	Rep	White Lake Township	January 1, 2019	Yes
24	Ruth Johnson	Rep	Holly	January 1, 2019	Yes
25	Dan Lauwers	Rep	Capac	January 1, 2019	Yes
26	Kevin Daley	Rep	Lum	January 1, 2019	Yes
27	John Daniel Cherry	Dem	Flint	January 1, 2023	No
28	Sam Singh	Dem	East Lansing	January 1, 2023	No
29	Winnie Brinks	Dem	Grand Rapids	January 1, 2019	Yes
30	Mark Huizenga	Rep	Walker	November 30, 2021	No
31	Roger Victory	Rep	Hudsonville	January 1, 2019	Yes
32	Jon Bumstead	Rep	Newaygo	January 1, 2019	Yes
33	Rick Outman	Rep	Six Lakes	January 1, 2019	Yes
34	Roger Hauck	Rep	Mount Pleasant	January 1, 2023	No
35	Chedrick Greene	Dem	Saginaw	May 21, 2026	No
36	Michele Hoitenga	Rep	Manton	January 1, 2023	No
37	John Damoose	Rep	Harbor Springs	January 1, 2023	No
38	Ed McBroom	Rep	Vulcan	January 1, 2019	Yes

== See also ==
- Government of Michigan
- Michigan Legislature
- Michigan State Capitol
- Michigan House of Representatives
- Michigan Republican Party
- Michigan Democratic Party
- Lieutenant Governor of Michigan
- List of majority leaders of the Michigan Senate
- Michigan Senate elections:
  - 2002
  - 2006
  - 2010
  - 2014
  - 2018
  - 2022
  - 2026
  - List of special elections to the Michigan Senate
