= 1990 Michigan Senate election =

- November 6, 1990

All 38 seats in the Michigan Senate 20 seats needed for a majority
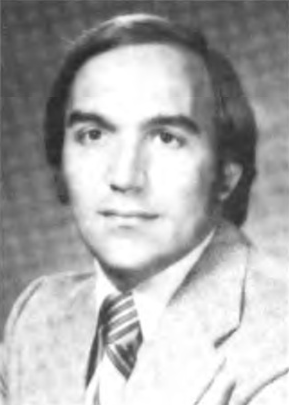

| | Majority party | Minority party |
|---|---|---|
| Leader | John Engler (retired) | Art Miller Jr. |
| Party | Republican | Democratic |
| Leader since | 1983 | 1985 |
| Leader's seat | 35 district | 27th district |
| Last election | 20 | 18 |
| Seats before | 20 | 17 |
| Seats after | 20 | 18 |
| Seat change | 0 | ▲1 |
| Popular vote | 1,150,056 | 1,257,094 |
| Percentage | 47.54% | 51.97% |
Majority Leader before election
John Engler
Republican
Elected Majority Leader
Dick Posthumus
Republican

An election was held on November 6, 1990, to elect all 38 members of the Michigan Senate for the 86th Michigan Legislature. In the election, the Republicans maintained their 20–18 majority over the Democrats.

== History ==
In the 1986 general election, the Republicans maintained a slim 20–18 majority over the Democrats. The Democrats lost a seat before the next election when State Senator Joseph Mack resigned in April 1990.

The 1990 primary election was held on August 7.

Before the general election, Democrat Debbie Stabenow was a front-runner in the 24th district, where incumbent Republican William A. Sederburg was retiring. There were four districts that were seen as the most competitive, and had the most campaign funds poured into them. One was the 37th district, with a retiring Democratic incumbent Mitch Irwin and the Republican candidate George A. McManus Jr.. Another was the 14th district where the Democratic incumbent Jerome T. Hart faced a serious threat from Republican Jon Cisky. In the 15th district, Democratic incumbent Jack Faxon faced a challenge from Republican Denise Alexander. Finally, a formerly Republican open seat in the 8th district was being contested by Republican Mat J. Dunaskiss and Democrat Gary Peters.

Redistricting was due in 1991, meaning whichever party won the majority would have a hand in shaping the next legislative districts of the state.

The general election was held on November 6. The 20–18 Republican majority was again maintained. Both parties flipped two seats each. Democrat Stabenow won in the 24th district. Of the four districts heavily focused on, Republican McManus Jr. won in the 37th district and Republican Cisky won in the 14th district, flipping both districts. Dunaskiss won in the 8th district, maintaining the seat for the Republicans. Democrat incumbent Faxon retained his seat. Democrat Jim Berryman additionally unseated Republican incumbent Norm Shinkle.

Republican Majority Leader John Engler retired from the state senate, being elected governor in 1990. Following the 1990 election, Dick Posthumus was elected majority leader to succeed him. Democrat Art Miller Jr. was re-elected as minority leader.

The state senate was sworn in on January 9, 1991.

== Results ==
The following are the official results from the 1991–1992 Michigan Manual.

=== Statewide ===
| Party | Candi- dates | Votes | | Seats | | |
| Party | Candi- dates | No. | % | No. | +/– | % |
|---|---|---|---|---|---|---|
| Republican Party | 32 | 1,150,056 | 47.54% | 20 | Steady | 52.63% |
| Democratic Party | 38 | 1,257,094 | 51.97% | 18 | ▲1 | 47.36% |
| Libertarian Party | 4 | 9,128 | 0.37% | 0 | Steady | 0.00% |
| Workers World Party | 1 | 2,321 | 0.09% | 0 | Steady | 0.00% |
| Write-ins | | 217 | 0.00% | 0 | Steady | 0.00% |
| Total | 75 | 2,418,816 | 100.00% | 38 | Steady | 100.00% |

=== By district ===
1st District
| Party | Candidate | Votes | % |
|---|---|---|---|
| Democratic | John F. Kelly (incumbent) | 33,376 | 61.96 |
| Republican | Philip Tannin | 20,486 | 38.03 |
| Write-in | | 5 | 0.00 |
| Total votes | | 53,867 | 100.0 |
| Democratic hold | | | |

2nd District
| Party | Candidate | Votes | % |
|---|---|---|---|
| Democratic | Virgil C. Smith (incumbent) | 34,224 | 99.98 |
| Write-in | | 5 | 0.01 |
| Total votes | | 34,229 | 100.0 |
| Democratic hold | | | |

3rd District
| Party | Candidate | Votes | % |
|---|---|---|---|
| Democratic | Jackie Vaughn III (incumbent) | 41,641 | 99.99 |
| Write-in | | 1 | 0.00 |
| Total votes | | 41,642 | 100.0 |
| Democratic hold | | | |

4th District
| Party | Candidate | Votes | % |
|---|---|---|---|
| Democratic | David S. Holmes Jr. (incumbent) | 28,106 | 99.99 |
| Write-in | | 1 | 0.00 |
| Total votes | | 28,107 | 100.0 |
| Democratic hold | | | |

5th District
| Party | Candidate | Votes | % |
|---|---|---|---|
| Democratic | Michael O'Brien (incumbent) | 37,470 | 99.98 |
| Write-in | | 5 | 0.01 |
| Total votes | | 37,475 | 100.0 |
| Democratic hold | | | |

6th District
| Party | Candidate | Votes | % |
|---|---|---|---|
| Republican | R. Robert Geake (incumbent) | 45,832 | 57.66 |
| Democratic | Patrick McDonald | 33,643 | 42.33 |
| Write-in | | 2 | 0.00 |
| Total votes | | 79,477 | 100.0 |
| Republican hold | | | |

7th District
| Party | Candidate | Votes | % |
|---|---|---|---|
| Democratic | Christopher D. Dingell (incumbent) | 42,049 | 66.79 |
| Republican | William Neubecker | 20,901 | 33.20 |
| Write-in | | 3 | 0.00 |
| Total votes | | 62,953 | 100.0 |
| Democratic hold | | | |

8th District
| Party | Candidate | Votes | % |
|---|---|---|---|
| Republican | Mat J. Dunaskiss | 38,262 | 54.10 |
| Democratic | Gary Peters | 32,458 | 45.89 |
| Write-in | | 4 | 0.00 |
| Total votes | | 70,724 | 100.0 |
| Republican hold | | | |

9th District
| Party | Candidate | Votes | % |
|---|---|---|---|
| Republican | Doug Carl (incumbent) | 39,256 | 53.75 |
| Democratic | Richard Notte | 33,772 | 46.24 |
| Write-in | | 5 | 0.00 |
| Total votes | | 73,033 | 100.0 |
| Republican hold | | | |

10th District
| Party | Candidate | Votes | % |
|---|---|---|---|
| Democratic | George Z. Hart (incumbent) | 39,957 | 59.25 |
| Republican | Frank Guido | 27,477 | 40.74 |
| Write-in | | 2 | 0.00 |
| Total votes | | 67,436 | 100.0 |
| Democratic hold | | | |

11th District
| Party | Candidate | Votes | % |
|---|---|---|---|
| Democratic | Jim Berryman | 29,370 | 51.52 |
| Republican | Norm Shinkle (incumbent) | 27,625 | 48.46 |
| Write-in | | 1 | 0.00 |
| Total votes | | 56,996 | 100.0 |
| Democratic gain from Republican | | | |

12th District
| Party | Candidate | Votes | % |
|---|---|---|---|
| Democratic | William Faust (incumbent) | 32,575 | 99.89 |
| Write-in | | 33 | 0.10 |
| Total votes | | 32,608 | 100.0 |
| Democratic hold | | | |

13th District
| Party | Candidate | Votes | % |
|---|---|---|---|
| Republican | Jack Welborn (incumbent) | 36,641 | 57.78 |
| Democratic | Ed LaForge | 26,770 | 42.21 |
| Write-in | | 3 | 0.00 |
| Total votes | | 63,414 | 100.0 |
| Republican hold | | | |

14th District
| Party | Candidate | Votes | % |
|---|---|---|---|
| Republican | Jon Cisky | 35,316 | 53.27 |
| Democratic | Jerome T. Hart (incumbent) | 30,967 | 46.71 |
| Write-in | | 2 | 0.00 |
| Total votes | | 66,285 | 100.0 |
| Republican gain from Democratic | | | |

15th District
| Party | Candidate | Votes | % |
|---|---|---|---|
| Democratic | Jack Faxon (incumbent) | 43,481 | 52.00 |
| Republican | Denise Alexander | 38,497 | 46.04 |
| Libertarian | Steven Silver | 1,620 | 1.93 |
| Write-in | | 4 | 0.00 |
| Total votes | | 83,602 | 100.0 |
| Democratic hold | | | |

16th District
| Party | Candidate | Votes | % |
|---|---|---|---|
| Republican | Doug Cruce (incumbent) | 41,731 | 57.62 |
| Democratic | John Freeman | 30,686 | 42.37 |
| Write-in | | 1 | 0.00 |
| Total votes | | 72,418 | 100.0 |
| Republican hold | | | |

17th District
| Party | Candidate | Votes | % |
|---|---|---|---|
| Republican | Dave Honigman | 57,529 | 67.09 |
| Democratic | William Foley | 28,194 | 32.88 |
| Write-in | | 17 | 0.01 |
| Total votes | | 85,740 | 100.0 |
| Republican hold | | | |

18th District
| Party | Candidate | Votes | % |
|---|---|---|---|
| Democratic | Lana Pollack (incumbent) | 47,615 | 63.79 |
| Republican | Rich Birkett | 27,003 | 36.17 |
| Write-in | | 20 | 0.02 |
| Total votes | | 74,638 | 100.0 |
| Democratic hold | | | |

19th District
| Party | Candidate | Votes | % |
|---|---|---|---|
| Republican | Nick Smith (incumbent) | 38,307 | 68.22 |
| Democratic | Dan Wood | 17,835 | 31.76 |
| Write-in | | 6 | 0.01 |
| Total votes | | 56,148 | 100.0 |
| Republican hold | | | |

20th District
| Party | Candidate | Votes | % |
|---|---|---|---|
| Republican | Joe Schwarz (incumbent) | 44,795 | 64.27 |
| Democratic | James Wardlaw | 24,902 | 35.72 |
| Write-in | | 1 | 0.00 |
| Total votes | | 69,698 | 100.0 |
| Republican hold | | | |

21st District
| Party | Candidate | Votes | % |
|---|---|---|---|
| Republican | Paul Wartner | 38,770 | 63.48 |
| Democratic | Charlie Rodebaugh | 22,299 | 36.51 |
| Total votes | | 61,069 | 100.0 |
| Republican hold | | | |

22nd District
| Party | Candidate | Votes | % |
|---|---|---|---|
| Republican | Harry Gast (incumbent) | 33,565 | 63.82 |
| Democratic | Gregory Cleveland | 19,022 | 36.16 |
| Write-in | | 4 | 0.00 |
| Total votes | | 52,591 | 100.0 |
| Republican hold | | | |

23rd District
| Party | Candidate | Votes | % |
|---|---|---|---|
| Republican | William Van Regenmorter | 58,260 | 75.14 |
| Democratic | Gerald Herp | 19,264 | 24.84 |
| Write-in | | 5 | 0.00 |
| Total votes | | 77,529 | 100.0 |
| Republican hold | | | |

24th District
| Party | Candidate | Votes | % |
|---|---|---|---|
| Democratic | Debbie Stabenow | 51,854 | 67.46 |
| Republican | Herbert Rudman | 23,111 | 30.07 |
| Libertarian | Robert Stepanovich | 1,884 | 2.45 |
| Write-in | | 8 | 0.01 |
| Total votes | | 76,857 | 100.0 |
| Democratic gain from Republican | | | |

25th District
| Party | Candidate | Votes | % |
|---|---|---|---|
| Democratic | Joe Conroy (incumbent) | 38,644 | 76.78 |
| Republican | Ted Jacques | 11,681 | 23.21 |
| Write-in | | 2 | 0.00 |
| Total votes | | 50,327 | 100.0 |
| Democratic hold | | | |

26th District
| Party | Candidate | Votes | % |
|---|---|---|---|
| Democratic | Gilbert DiNello (incumbent) | 41,410 | 63.02 |
| Republican | Joe Bondi | 21,963 | 33.42 |
| Workers World | Beverley Bloedel | 2,321 | 3.53 |
| Write-in | | 5 | 0.00 |
| Total votes | | 65,699 | 100.0 |
| Democratic hold | | | |

27th District
| Party | Candidate | Votes | % |
|---|---|---|---|
| Democratic | Art Miller Jr. (incumbent) | 42,600 | 91.43 |
| Libertarian | Thomas Sydlow | 3,986 | 8.55 |
| Write-in | | 4 | 0.00 |
| Total votes | | 46,590 | 100.0 |
| Democratic hold | | | |

28th District
| Party | Candidate | Votes | % |
|---|---|---|---|
| Republican | Dan DeGrow (incumbent) | 42,354 | 61.36 |
| Democratic | James Denault | 26,662 | 38.62 |
| Write-in | | 9 | 0.01 |
| Total votes | | 69,025 | 100.0 |
| Republican hold | | | |

29th District
| Party | Candidate | Votes | % |
|---|---|---|---|
| Democratic | John D. Cherry (incumbent) | 38,197 | 61.63 |
| Republican | Gary Morrison | 23,779 | 38.36 |
| Total votes | | 61,976 | 100.0 |
| Democratic hold | | | |

30th District
| Party | Candidate | Votes | % |
|---|---|---|---|
| Republican | Frederick Dillingham (incumbent) | 41,354 | 58.04 |
| Democratic | Arlene Law | 28,251 | 39.65 |
| Libertarian | Gary Bradley | 1,638 | 2.29 |
| Write-in | | 3 | 0.00 |
| Total votes | | 71,246 | 100.0 |
| Republican hold | | | |

31st District
| Party | Candidate | Votes | % |
|---|---|---|---|
| Republican | Dick Posthumus (incumbent) | 55,722 | 72.59 |
| Democratic | James Rinck | 21,031 | 27.39 |
| Write-in | | 4 | 0.00 |
| Total votes | | 76,757 | 100.0 |
| Republican hold | | | |

32nd District
| Party | Candidate | Votes | % |
|---|---|---|---|
| Republican | Vern Ehlers (incumbent) | 48,350 | 70.20 |
| Democratic | James Harris | 20,516 | 29.79 |
| Write-in | | 2 | 0.00 |
| Total votes | | 68,868 | 100.0 |
| Republican hold | | | |

33rd District
| Party | Candidate | Votes | % |
|---|---|---|---|
| Republican | Phil Arthurhultz (incumbent) | 36,994 | 53.97 |
| Democratic | Janet Thomas | 31,548 | 46.02 |
| Total votes | | 68,542 | 100.0 |
| Republican hold | | | |

34th District
| Party | Candidate | Votes | % |
|---|---|---|---|
| Democratic | James Barcia (incumbent) | 47,853 | 70.40 |
| Republican | Richard Thatcher | 20,115 | 29.59 |
| Write-in | | 2 | 0.00 |
| Total votes | | 67,970 | 100.0 |
| Democratic hold | | | |

35th District
| Party | Candidate | Votes | % |
|---|---|---|---|
| Republican | Joanne G. Emmons | 43,942 | 62.06 |
| Democratic | Jo McLachlan | 26,845 | 37.91 |
| Write-in | | 15 | 0.02 |
| Total votes | | 70,802 | 100.0 |
| Republican hold | | | |

36th District
| Party | Candidate | Votes | % |
|---|---|---|---|
| Republican | John Pridnia | 45,525 | 59.50 |
| Democratic | Ted Modrzynski | 30,978 | 40.48 |
| Write-in | | 5 | 0.00 |
| Total votes | | 76,508 | 100.0 |
| Republican hold | | | |

37th District
| Party | Candidate | Votes | % |
|---|---|---|---|
| Republican | George A. McManus Jr. | 44,749 | 54.02 |
| Democratic | Tom Weiss | 38,076 | 45.96 |
| Write-in | | 7 | 0.00 |
| Total votes | | 82,832 | 100.0 |
| Republican gain from Democratic | | | |

38th District
| Party | Candidate | Votes | % |
|---|---|---|---|
| Democratic | Don Koivisto | 42,953 | 68.03 |
| Republican | Peter Koski | 20,164 | 31.93 |
| Write-in | | 21 | 0.03 |
| Total votes | | 63,138 | 100.0 |
| Democratic hold | | | |

=== Special election ===
A special election was held alongside the general state senate election in the 38th district. The seat was left vacant when incumbent Democrat Joseph Mack resigned, after being charged in April 1990 for a misdemeanor in relation to billing the state government for trips he did not make. Democratic nominee Don Koivisto won the special election, as well as the general election, and was sworn in on November 14, 1990.

The following is the official results from the 1991–1992 Michigan Manual.

38th District special election
| Party | Candidate | Votes | % |
|---|---|---|---|
| Democratic | Don Koivisto | 39,898 | 67.61 |
| Republican | Peter Koski | 19,101 | 32.37 |
| Write-in | | 6 | 0.01 |
| Total votes | | 59,005 | 100.0 |
| Democratic hold | | | |

== See also ==
- 1990 Michigan House of Representatives election
