= 1986 Michigan Senate election =

- November 4, 1986

All 38 seats in the Michigan Senate 20 seats needed for a majority
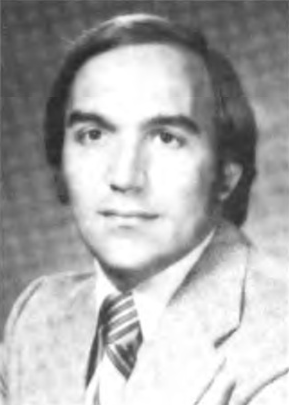

| | Majority party | Minority party |
|---|---|---|
| Leader | John Engler | Art Miller Jr. |
| Party | Republican | Democratic |
| Leader since | 1983 | 1985 |
| Leader's seat | 35 district | 27th district |
| Last election | 18 | 20 |
| Seats before | 20 | 18 |
| Seats after | 20 | 18 |
| Seat change | 0 | 0 |
| Popular vote | 1,015,890 | 1,242,252 |
| Percentage | 44.79% | 54.77% |
Majority Leader before election
John Engler
Republican
Elected Majority Leader
John Engler
Republican

An election was held on November 4, 1986, to elect all 38 members of the Michigan Senate for the 84th Michigan Legislature. In the election, the Republicans maintained the 20–18 majority they had won in a 1983 special election.

== History ==
In the 1982 general election, Democrats lost four seats in the state Senate, but maintained a majority. There where were 20 Democratic state senators and 18 Republican state senators. In November 1982, two Democratic state senators faced successful recall elections. The first was Philip Mastin in the 8th district, and the second was David M. Serotkin in the 9th district. The recalls were triggered by their support for a temporary increase in state income tax. They were the first state legislators recalled in Michigan history. Both state senators were replaced by Republicans in the subsequent special election in January 1983. Mastin was replaced by Rudy Nichols and Serotkin was replaced by Kirby Holmes. The special election gave Republicans a 20–18 majority over the Democrats.

The 1986 primary election was held on August 5. It saw one incumbent state senator unseated, that being Republican Kirby Holmes, in favor of Doug Cruce.

The general election was on November 4. Despite incumbent Democratic governor James J. Blanchard winning re-election, and state House winning a Democratic majority, the state Senate Republicans maintained their 20–18 majority. There were no incumbent state senators unseated in the general. Following the election, Majority Leader John Engler and Minority Leader Art Miller Jr. were both re-elected.

The state Senate was sworn in on January 14, 1987.

== Results ==
The following are the official results from the 1987–1988 Michigan Manual.

=== Statewide ===
| Party | Candi- dates | Votes | | Seats | | |
| Party | Candi- dates | No. | % | No. | +/– | % |
|---|---|---|---|---|---|---|
| Republican Party | 36 | 1,015,890 | 44.79% | 20 | Steady | 52.63% |
| Democratic Party | 38 | 1,242,252 | 54.77% | 18 | Steady | 47.36% |
| Independent | 5 | 9,590 | 0.42% | 0 | Steady | 0.00% |
| Write-ins | | 80 | 0.00% | 0 | Steady | 0.00% |
| Total | 79 | 2,267,812 | 100.00% | 38 | Steady | 100.00% |

=== By district ===
1st District
| Party | Candidate | Votes | % |
|---|---|---|---|
| Democratic | John F. Kelly (incumbent) | 41,367 | 69.96 |
| Republican | John Lauve | 17,754 | 30.02 |
| Write-in | | 2 | 0.00 |
| Total votes | | 59,123 | 100.0 |
| Democratic hold | | | |

2nd District
| Party | Candidate | Votes | % |
|---|---|---|---|
| Democratic | Basil W. Brown (incumbent) | 41,024 | 84.34 |
| Republican | Mitchell Lewandowski | 7,615 | 15.65 |
| Total votes | | 48,639 | 100.0 |
| Democratic hold | | | |

3rd District
| Party | Candidate | Votes | % |
|---|---|---|---|
| Democratic | Jackie Vaughn III (incumbent) | 51,548 | 94.02 |
| Republican | Nora Hudson | 3,275 | 5.97 |
| Write-in | | 2 | 0.00 |
| Total votes | | 54,825 | 100.0 |
| Democratic hold | | | |

4th District
| Party | Candidate | Votes | % |
|---|---|---|---|
| Democratic | David S. Holmes Jr. (incumbent) | 37,924 | 90.02 |
| Republican | Latanya Matthews | 4,200 | 9.96 |
| Write-in | | 4 | 0.00 |
| Total votes | | 42,128 | 100.0 |
| Democratic hold | | | |

5th District
| Party | Candidate | Votes | % |
|---|---|---|---|
| Democratic | Michael O'Brien (incumbent) | 44,058 | 87.36 |
| Republican | Esther Moreno | 6,370 | 12.63 |
| Total votes | | 50,428 | 100.0 |
| Democratic hold | | | |

6th District
| Party | Candidate | Votes | % |
|---|---|---|---|
| Republican | R. Robert Geake (incumbent) | 43,569 | 61.24 |
| Democratic | Thomas Healy | 27,571 | 38.75 |
| Total votes | | 71,140 | 100.0 |
| Republican hold | | | |

7th District
| Party | Candidate | Votes | % |
|---|---|---|---|
| Democratic | Christopher D. Dingell | 45,535 | 72.67 |
| Republican | Tom Krustch | 17,114 | 27.31 |
| Write-in | | 5 | 0.00 |
| Total votes | | 62,654 | 100.0 |
| Democratic hold | | | |

8th District
| Party | Candidate | Votes | % |
|---|---|---|---|
| Republican | Rudy Nichols (incumbent) | 33,443 | 55.52 |
| Democratic | Linda Ferrens | 26,785 | 44.47 |
| Write-in | | 1 | 0.00 |
| Total votes | | 60,229 | 100.0 |
| Republican hold | | | |

9th District
| Party | Candidate | Votes | % |
|---|---|---|---|
| Republican | Doug Carl | 30,630 | 52.57 |
| Democratic | Jim Ayres | 26,898 | 46.17 |
| Independent | Virginia Cropsey | 723 | 1.24 |
| Write-in | | 6 | 0.01 |
| Total votes | | 58,257 | 100.0 |
| Republican hold | | | |

10th District
| Party | Candidate | Votes | % |
|---|---|---|---|
| Democratic | George Z. Hart | 38,266 | 52.06 |
| Republican | Bill Runco | 35,226 | 47.93 |
| Write-in | | 1 | 0.00 |
| Total votes | | 73,493 | 100.0 |
| Democratic hold | | | |

11th District
| Party | Candidate | Votes | % |
|---|---|---|---|
| Republican | Norm Shinkle (incumbent) | 26,602 | 55.34 |
| Democratic | Bernard Margolis | 21,465 | 44.65 |
| Write-in | | 2 | 0.00 |
| Total votes | | 48,069 | 100.0 |
| Republican hold | | | |

12th District
| Party | Candidate | Votes | % |
|---|---|---|---|
| Democratic | William Faust (incumbent) | 34,682 | 75.69 |
| Republican | Matthew Bell | 11,136 | 24.30 |
| Write-in | | 1 | 0.00 |
| Total votes | | 45,819 | 100.0 |
| Democratic hold | | | |

13th District
| Party | Candidate | Votes | % |
|---|---|---|---|
| Republican | Jack Welborn (incumbent) | 32,195 | 59.55 |
| Democratic | Paul Denenfeld | 21,861 | 40.44 |
| Total votes | | 54,056 | 100.0 |
| Republican hold | | | |

14th District
| Party | Candidate | Votes | % |
|---|---|---|---|
| Democratic | Jerome T. Hart (incumbent) | 35,115 | 56.62 |
| Republican | Ruth Braun | 26,897 | 43.37 |
| Total votes | | 62,012 | 100.0 |
| Democratic hold | | | |

15th District
| Party | Candidate | Votes | % |
|---|---|---|---|
| Democratic | Jack Faxon (incumbent) | 46,222 | 62.61 |
| Republican | Frank Brock | 27,601 | 37.38 |
| Total votes | | 73,823 | 100.0 |
| Democratic hold | | | |

16th District
| Party | Candidate | Votes | % |
|---|---|---|---|
| Republican | Doug Cruce (incumbent) | 38,409 | 57.64 |
| Democratic | Martha Kinney | 28,226 | 42.35 |
| Write-in | | 1 | 0.00 |
| Total votes | | 66,636 | 100.0 |
| Republican hold | | | |

17th District
| Party | Candidate | Votes | % |
|---|---|---|---|
| Republican | Richard Fessler (incumbent) | 44,914 | 64.85 |
| Democratic | Martha Blom | 23,840 | 34.42 |
| Independent | Emily Salvette | 491 | 0.70 |
| Write-in | | 4 | 0.00 |
| Total votes | | 69,249 | 100.0 |
| Republican hold | | | |

18th District
| Party | Candidate | Votes | % |
|---|---|---|---|
| Democratic | Lana Pollack (incumbent) | 42,635 | 63.97 |
| Republican | Dale Apley Jr. | 24,007 | 36.02 |
| Write-in | | 2 | 0.00 |
| Total votes | | 66,644 | 100.0 |
| Democratic hold | | | |

19th District
| Party | Candidate | Votes | % |
|---|---|---|---|
| Republican | Nick Smith (incumbent) | 36,040 | 67.32 |
| Democratic | Bill Goff | 17,475 | 32.64 |
| Write-in | | 16 | 0.02 |
| Total votes | | 53,531 | 100.0 |
| Republican hold | | | |

20th District
| Party | Candidate | Votes | % |
|---|---|---|---|
| Republican | Joe Schwarz | 33,574 | 51.52 |
| Democratic | Richard Fitzpatrick | 31,581 | 48.47 |
| Total votes | | 65,155 | 100.0 |
| Republican hold | | | |

21st District
| Party | Candidate | Votes | % |
|---|---|---|---|
| Republican | Harmon G. Cropsey (incumbent) | 29,439 | 54.80 |
| Democratic | Charles Rodebaugh | 24,272 | 45.18 |
| Write-in | | 1 | 0.00 |
| Total votes | | 53,712 | 100.0 |
| Republican hold | | | |

22nd District
| Party | Candidate | Votes | % |
|---|---|---|---|
| Republican | Harry Gast (incumbent) | 33,920 | 68.59 |
| Democratic | Evan LeDuc | 15,530 | 31.40 |
| Write-in | | 2 | 0.00 |
| Total votes | | 49,452 | 100.0 |
| Republican hold | | | |

23rd District
| Party | Candidate | Votes | % |
|---|---|---|---|
| Republican | Edgar Fredricks (incumbent) | 43,316 | 69.63 |
| Democratic | Margaret Spreitzer | 18,889 | 30.36 |
| Total votes | | 62,205 | 100.0 |
| Republican hold | | | |

24th District
| Party | Candidate | Votes | % |
|---|---|---|---|
| Republican | William A. Sederburg (incumbent) | 39,966 | 57.89 |
| Democratic | Lingg Brewer | 29,060 | 42.09 |
| Write-in | | 3 | 0.00 |
| Total votes | | 69,029 | 100.0 |
| Republican hold | | | |

25th District
| Party | Candidate | Votes | % |
|---|---|---|---|
| Democratic | Joe Conroy (incumbent) | 42,716 | 80.04 |
| Republican | Daniel Schon | 10,648 | 19.95 |
| Write-in | | 2 | 0.00 |
| Total votes | | 53,366 | 100.0 |
| Democratic hold | | | |

26th District
| Party | Candidate | Votes | % |
|---|---|---|---|
| Democratic | Gilbert DiNello (incumbent) | 44,587 | 90.29 |
| Independent | Lawrence Ludlow | 4,783 | 9.68 |
| Write-in | | 7 | 0.01 |
| Total votes | | 49,377 | 100.0 |
| Democratic hold | | | |

27th District
| Party | Candidate | Votes | % |
|---|---|---|---|
| Democratic | Art Miller Jr. (incumbent) | 42,890 | 75.09 |
| Republican | Michael Pal | 14,218 | 24.89 |
| Write-in | | 3 | 0.00 |
| Total votes | | 57,111 | 100.0 |
| Democratic hold | | | |

28th District
| Party | Candidate | Votes | % |
|---|---|---|---|
| Republican | Dan DeGrow (incumbent) | 39,485 | 64.62 |
| Democratic | James Green | 18,646 | 30.51 |
| Independent | John Safran | 2,962 | 4.84 |
| Write-in | | 2 | 0.00 |
| Total votes | | 61,095 | 100.0 |
| Republican hold | | | |

29th District
| Party | Candidate | Votes | % |
|---|---|---|---|
| Democratic | John D. Cherry | 39,750 | 69.45 |
| Republican | Dale McMichael | 17,481 | 30.54 |
| Total votes | | 57,231 | 100.0 |
| Democratic hold | | | |

30th District
| Party | Candidate | Votes | % |
|---|---|---|---|
| Republican | Fred Dillingham | 32,663 | 52.45 |
| Democratic | Patricia McAvoy | 28,978 | 46.53 |
| Independent | Gary Bradley | 631 | 1.01 |
| Total votes | | 62,272 | 100.0 |
| Republican hold | | | |

31st District
| Party | Candidate | Votes | % |
|---|---|---|---|
| Republican | Dick Posthumus (incumbent) | 42,677 | 71.46 |
| Democratic | Diane Siciliano | 17,037 | 28.53 |
| Total votes | | 59,714 | 100.0 |
| Republican hold | | | |

32nd District
| Party | Candidate | Votes | % |
|---|---|---|---|
| Republican | Vern Ehlers (incumbent) | 42,626 | 68.96 |
| Democratic | Glenn Barkan | 19,185 | 31.03 |
| Total votes | | 61,811 | 100.0 |
| Republican hold | | | |

33rd District
| Party | Candidate | Votes | % |
|---|---|---|---|
| Republican | Phil Arthurhultz (incumbent) | 42,392 | 67.82 |
| Democratic | Dale Williams | 20,106 | 32.17 |
| Total votes | | 62,498 | 100.0 |
| Republican hold | | | |

34th District
| Party | Candidate | Votes | % |
|---|---|---|---|
| Democratic | James Barcia (incumbent) | 48,521 | 99.98 |
| Write-in | | 7 | 0.01 |
| Total votes | | 48,528 | 100.0 |
| Democratic hold | | | |

35th District
| Party | Candidate | Votes | % |
|---|---|---|---|
| Republican | John Engler (incumbent) | 40,204 | 59.22 |
| Democratic | Gerald White | 27,683 | 40.77 |
| Write-in | | 2 | 0.00 |
| Total votes | | 67,889 | 100.0 |
| Republican hold | | | |

36th District
| Party | Candidate | Votes | % |
|---|---|---|---|
| Republican | Connie Binsfeld (incumbent) | 47,721 | 62.68 |
| Democratic | Joseph Elliott | 28,413 | 37.31 |
| Total votes | | 76,134 | 100.0 |
| Republican hold | | | |

37th District
| Party | Candidate | Votes | % |
|---|---|---|---|
| Democratic | Mitch Irwin (incumbent) | 51,893 | 71.69 |
| Republican | John Knorr | 20,492 | 28.30 |
| Total votes | | 72,385 | 100.0 |
| Democratic hold | | | |

38th District
| Party | Candidate | Votes | % |
|---|---|---|---|
| Democratic | Joseph Mack (incumbent) | 40,018 | 68.88 |
| Republican | Peter Koski | 18,071 | 31.10 |
| Write-in | | 4 | 0.00 |
| Total votes | | 58,093 | 100.0 |
| Democratic hold | | | |

== See also ==
- 1986 Michigan House of Representatives election
