= Senator McManus =

Senator McManus may refer to:

- Edward J. McManus (1920–2017), Iowa State Senate
- Edward Patrick McManus (1857–1918), Iowa State Senate
- George A. McManus Jr. (1930–2024), Michigan State Senate
- Michelle McManus (politician) (born 1966), Michigan State Senate
- Thomas J. McManus (1864–1926), New York State Senate
