= Edward McManus =

Edward McManus may refer to:

- Edward Patrick McManus (1857–1918), American politician from Iowa
- Edward J. McManus (1920–2017), American politician and federal judge from Iowa
- Eddie McManus (born 1937), English footballer, see List of Gillingham F.C. players (1–24 appearances)
