= Laura M. Toy =

American politician

Member of the Michigan Senate from the 6th district
- In office January 1, 2003 – December 31, 2006
- Preceded by: George Z. Hart
- Succeeded by: Glenn S. Anderson

Member of the Michigan House of Representatives from the 19th district
- In office January 1, 1999 – December 31, 2002
- Preceded by: Lyn Bankes
- Succeeded by: John R. Pastor

Personal details
- Born: December 22, 1951 (age 74) Livonia, Michigan
- Party: Republican
- Education: University of Michigan; Schoolcraft College

Laura M. Toy (born December 22, 1951) is an American politician who served in both the Michigan Senate and Michigan House of Representatives as a Republican. She is currently a member of the Livonia City Council, a position she has held for multiple non-consecutive terms over different decades.

== Early life ==
Toy was born on December 22, 1951, in Livonia, Michigan.

== Education ==
Toy earned a BGS degree from the University of Michigan and an associate degree Schoolcraft College.

== Career ==
Toy served as a Schoolcraft College Trustee from 1979 to 1986. Toy then served on the Livonia City Council from 1987 to 1995. Toy served as Livonia City Treasurer from 1996 to 1998. On November 3, 1998, Toy was elected to the Michigan House of Representatives where she represented the 19th district from January 13, 1999, to December 31, 2002. In 1999, Toy was appointed by Governor John Engler to the Council for Handicapped Infants and Toddlers. On November 5, 2002, Toy was elected to the Michigan Senate where she represented the 6th district from January 8, 2003, to December 31, 2006. Toy is a member of the League of Women Voters.
