= 2008 Bay County Executive election =

- November 4, 2008
Nominee	Thomas L. Hickner
Party	Democratic
Popular vote	42,534
Percentage	98.53%
Bay County Executive before election
Thomas L. Hickner
Democratic
Elected Bay County Executive
Thomas L. Hickner
Democratic

The 2008 Bay County Executive election was held on November 4, 2008. Incumbent County Executive Thomas L. Hickner ran for re-election, seeking a fifth term. He faced Mark McFarlin, the 2004 Republican nominee for County Executive, in the general election, and won renomination by a wide margin. In the general election, Hickner faced no opposition and was re-elected unopposed.

== Democratic primary ==
=== Candidates ===
- Thomas L. Hickner, incumbent County Executive
- Mark McFarlin, casino worker, 2004 Republican nominee for County Executive

=== Campaign ===
Hickner ran for re-election to a fifth term in office, emphasizing his record as County Executive in stewarding the county's finances. He was challenged by McFarlin, his 2004 Republican opponent and a frequent candidate for local office, who argued that, "after 16 years, four terms, we need new leadership." Hickner criticized McFarlin as inexperienced, noting, "The fact that I've only seen Mark in the building once, and he's never requested a copy of the budget, I'm not sure he understands the complexity of the organization."

The Bay City Times endorsed Hickner, praising him for having the "background, experience, and a proven track record of fiscal leadership." The Times noted that, "[u]nder Hickner's tenure, the county time and again has enacted initiatives that set—and are still setting—the tone for state and national policy debates," including "[p]rescription drug discount cards, a Bay Health Plan for the working poor, a phosphorus lawn fertilizer ban and debate over a proposed tax to support the Health Plan." Hickner ultimately defeated McFarlin in a landslide, winning 71 percent of the vote.

=== Results ===
Democratic primary results
Party	Candidate	Votes	%
Democratic	Thomas L. Hickner (inc.)	8,257	70.92%
Democratic	Mark McFarlin	3,364	28.89%
Democratic	Write-ins	22	0.19%
Total votes		11,643	100.00%

== Republican primary ==
=== Candidates ===
No candidates filed for the Republican nomination.

=== Results ===
Republican primary results
Party	Candidate	Votes	%
Republican	Write-ins	99	100.00%
Total votes		99	100.00%

== General election ==
=== Results ===
2008 Bay County Executive election
Party	Candidate	Votes	%
Democratic	Thomas L. Hickner (inc.)	42,534	98.53%
Write-in		636	1.47%
Total votes		43,170	100.00%
Democratic hold			
