= 2012 Bay County Executive election =

- November 6, 2012
Nominee	Thomas L. Hickner
Party	Democratic
Popular vote	38,426
Percentage	98.49%
Bay County Executive before election
Thomas L. Hickner
Democratic
Elected Bay County Executive
Thomas L. Hickner
Democratic

The 2012 Bay County Executive election was held on November 6, 2012. Incumbent County Executive Thomas L. Hickner ran for re-election to a sixth term. He defeated Mark McFarlin, a perennial candidate, in the Democratic primary, by a wide margin. Hickner faced no opposition in the general election and was re-elected unopposed.

== Democratic primary ==
=== Candidates ===
- Thomas L. Hickner, incumbent County Executive
- Mark McFarlin, private investigator, perennial candidate

=== Campaign ===
Hickner ran for re-election to a sixth term as County Executive, citing his "experience and knowledge" in managing the county and his record of putting the county's finances in "excellent shape." He pointed to the fact that he "balanced the budget every year with no increase in general fund tax rates, while maintaining a healthy 'rainy day' fund." He was challenged by Mark McFarlin, who was the 2004 Republican nominee for County Executive and a 2008 Democratic candidate. McFarlin attacked Hickner as a "tax-and-spend liberal," arguing that county government salaries needed to be frozen and taxes needed to be dramatically cut "to stimulate growth in the commercial sector and provide needed employment." He criticized the County Commission as "reckless and undemocratic," and Hickner for "fail[ing] to hold the County Commission in check." Despite the sharp differences between the candidates, neither candidate raised or spent significant campaign funds, though Hickner raised significantly more than McFarlin.

=== Results ===
Democratic primary results
Party	Candidate	Votes	%
Democratic	Thomas L. Hickner (inc.)	8,114	67.01%
Democratic	Mark McFarlin	3,971	32.80%
Democratic	Write-ins	23	0.19%
Total votes		12,108	100.00%

== Republican primary ==
=== Candidates ===
No candidates filed for the Republican nomination.

=== Results ===
Republican primary results
Party	Candidate	Votes	%
Republican	Write-ins	182	100.00%
Total votes		182	100.00%

== General election ==
=== Results ===
2012 Bay County Executive election
Party	Candidate	Votes	%
Democratic	Thomas L. Hickner (inc.)	38,426	98.49%
Write-in		591	1.51%
Total votes		39,017	100.00%
Democratic hold			
