= John J. Walsh =

American politician

Member of the Michigan House of Representatives from the 19th district
- In office January 1, 2009 – December 31, 2014
- Preceded by: John R. Pastor
- Succeeded by: Laura Cox

Personal details
- Born: August 19, 1962 (age 64) Garden City, Michigan, U.S.
- Party: Republican
- Spouse: Janice
- Children: 2
- Education: Michigan State University (BA); Wayne State University (JD)

John J. Walsh (born August 19, 1962) is an American attorney, businessman and former politician from Michigan. Walsh is the president and CEO of the Michigan Manufacturers Association.

== Early life and education ==
On August 19, 1962, Walsh was born in Garden City, Michigan. In 1984, Walsh earned a Bachelor of Arts degree from Michigan State University. In 1987, Walsh earned a JD degree from the Wayne State University Law School.

== Career ==
Walsh was a corporate lawyer and an executive at Schoolcraft College.

In 1998, Walsh became a member and vice president of the Livonia City Council. Walsh served as a council member until 2001.

Walsh served as a member of the Michigan House of Representatives, first elected in 2008. Walsh represented the city of Livonia, and served as the Speaker Pro Tempore.

In January 2019, Walsh became president of Downtown Detroit Partnership. In January 2020, Walsh became the president and CEO of Michigan Manufacturers Association. Walsh succeeded Chuck Hadden.

== Personal life ==
Walsh's wife is Janice Walsh. They have two children. Walsh and his family live in Garden City, Michigan.

== Gallery ==
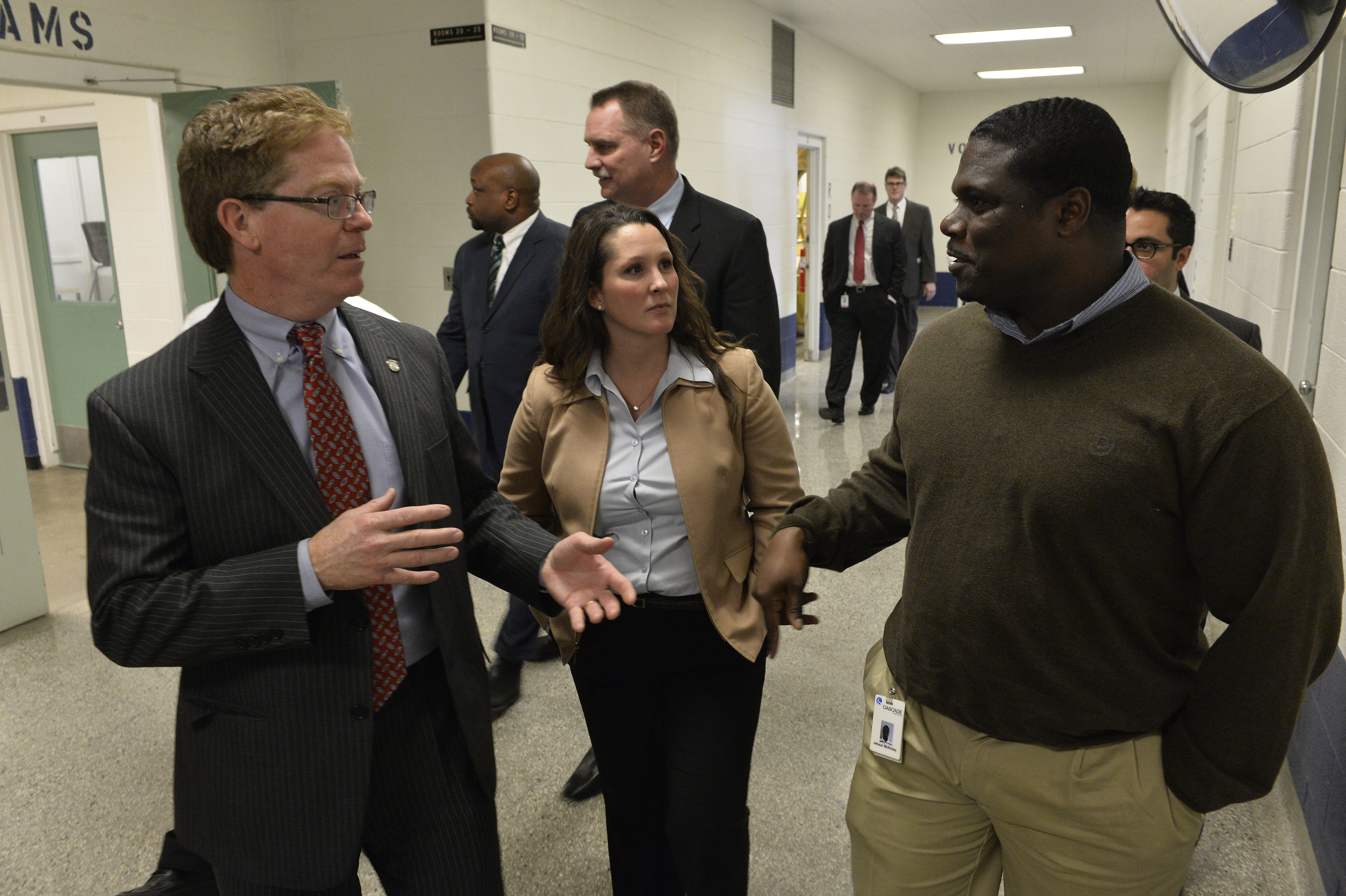
John Walsh (left) and Lisa Posthumus Lyons (middle) speak with JaHaun McKinley (right) of Cascade Engineering.
