= David Gubow =

American judge and politician (born 1949)

The Honorable David M. Gubow

Judge of the 45th District Court of Michigan
- Incumbent
- Assumed office January 1, 2003

Member of the Michigan House of Representatives from the 67th district
- In office January 1, 1985 – December 31, 1993
- Preceded by: Joseph Forbes
- Succeeded by: Dan Gustafson

Member of the Michigan House of Representatives from the 35th district
- In office January 1, 1993 – December 31, 1998
- Preceded by: Lyn Bankes
- Succeeded by: Gilda Jacobs

Personal details
- Born: September 22, 1949 (age 77) Ann Arbor, Michigan
- Party: Democratic
- Spouse: Dorothy
- Education: University of Detroit School of Law; University of Michigan

David M. Gubow is a judge in Michigan and a former Democratic member of the Michigan House of Representatives.

A graduate of the University of Michigan, Gubow earned his bachelor's degree in urban studies and a varsity letter for hockey. He later went on to study law at the University of Detroit and was admitted to the bar in 1975.

He was elected to the House in 1984 and was re-elected six more times before term limits prevented him from further service there. He was elected assistant clerk of the House in 1999, serving there until 2002.

In 2002, Gubow was elected a district judge in Oakland County. He was re-elected in 2008 and 2014. Gubow was chief judge of the court from 2003 through 2007, and presently serves as chief judge pro tem.

Gubow's father, Lawrence, was a federal prosecutor from 1961 through 1968, and federal judge from 1968 until his death in 1978.

== Personal life ==
He is Jewish.
