= 2016 Bay County Executive election =

- November 8, 2016
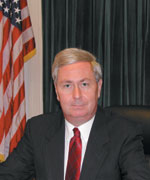
Nominee	James Barcia
Party	Democratic
Popular vote	37,507
Percentage	97.75%
Bay County Executive before election
Thomas L. Hickner
Democratic
Elected Bay County Executive
James Barcia
Democratic

The 2016 Bay County Executive election was held on November 8, 2016. Incumbent County Executive Thomas L. Hickner, who was first elected in 1992, ran for re-election to his seventh term. He was challenged in the Democratic primary by former Congressman James Barcia. Barcia ultimately defeated Hickner in the primary by a wide margin, winning 56 percent of the vote to Hickner's 38 percent, and was unopposed in the general election.

== Democratic primary ==
=== Candidates ===
- James Barcia, former Congressman, former State Senator
- Thomas L. Hickner, incumbent County Executive
- Mark McFarlin, perennial candidate

=== Campaign ===
Hickner ran for re-election to a seventh term, which he said would be his final term in office, emphasizing his managerial experience and plans to continue the county's positive economic development. He was challenged by former Congressman and State Senator James Barcia, who argued that "Bay County as a whole has lagged behind the growth the city has shown." Barcia said that people in the community had asked him to run based on his "state and federal legislative experience, my contacts and my knowledge of the state programs and appropriations process," and said that he would be a "visible and engaged" executive.

In the final month of the campaign, the race turned sharply negative. Barcia's personal Facebook account was hacked in July, and a pornographic image was sent out to his friends. He accused Hickner's campaign of being responsible, because his supporters "are the only ones with the motivation to send such an image." Hickner denied the allegations, saying, "The Barcia campaign has had numerous unfounded accusations against us, all of which have been unfounded." A subsequent investigation by the Michigan State Police concluded that the image was sent out by malware that "affect[ed] hundreds of thousands of people," but Barcia said that, after "consult[ing] an IT professional who told us we were actually hacked," he "[didn't] believe it was a random virus," and planned to request that the FBI investigate the incident.

Hickner accused Barcia of hiding contributions amounting to $10,000 from a political action committee associated with former Republican State Senator Roger Kahn. Barcia, in turn, said that his campaign "had no intention of cashing those checks" and returned them to Kahn, which was why he did not report them on his campaign finance report. Hickner accused Barcia of lying, saying, "I think what happened is that their hands were caught in the cookie jar and this is their best shot at dealing with this by not accepting a check," pointing to Barcia's 2004 federal indictment for making illegal campaign contributions. He also argued that Barcia had manipulatively used dated footage of former U.S. Senator Carl Levin and Senator Debbie Stabenow to suggest that they had endorsed his campaign. Barcia's campaign published a video on Facebook and ran a similar advertisement on the local news that featured Levin and Stabenow praising him when he retired from Congress in 2003. Both Levin and Stabenow confirmed that they had not made endorsements in the race. Barcia apologized for any confusion, saying, "The point of the ad was to show that I've been a hardworking public servant for many years at the state and federal level," and that there was "no endorsement reference in the ad."

Barcia ultimately defeated Hickner, winning 56 percent of the vote to Hickner's 38 percent, while perennial candidate Mark McFarlin received 6 percent.

=== Results ===
Democratic primary results
Party	Candidate	Votes	%
Democratic	James Barcia	9,110	56.17%
Democratic	Thomas L. Hickner (inc.)	6,178	38.09%
Democratic	Mark McFarlin	909	5.60%
Democratic	Write-ins	21	0.13%
Total votes		16,218	100.00%

== Republican primary ==
=== Candidates ===
No candidates filed for the Republican nomination.

=== Results ===
Republican primary results
Party	Candidate	Votes	%
Republican	Write-ins	185	100.00%
Total votes		185	100.00%

== General election ==
=== Results ===
2016 Bay County Executive election
Party	Candidate	Votes	%
Democratic	James Barcia	37,507	97.75%
Write-in		862	2.25%
Total votes		38,369	100.00%
Democratic hold			
