= Jeremy Moss =

American politician (born 1986)

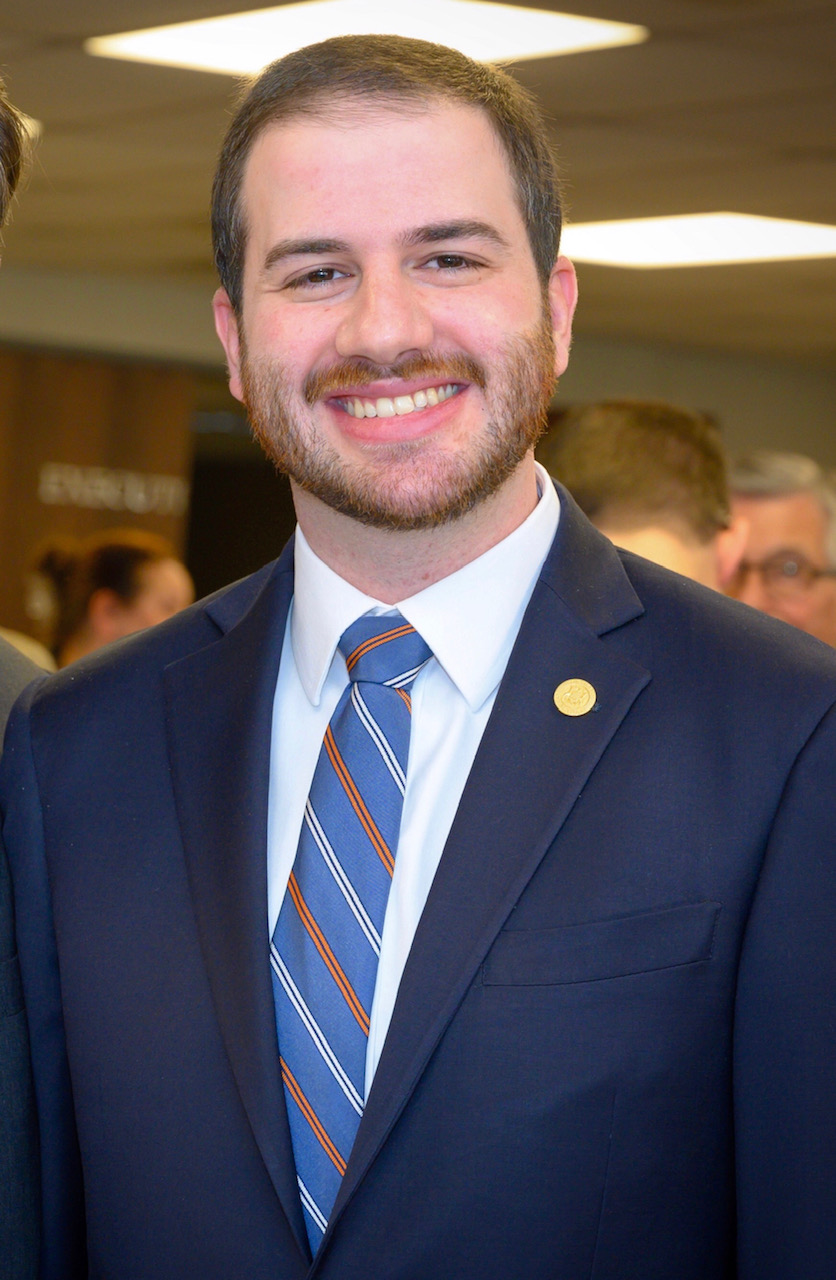
- Moss in 2019

Member-elect of the U.S. House of Representatives from Michigan's 11th district
- Assuming office January 3, 2027
- Succeeding: Haley Stevens

President pro tempore of the Michigan Senate
- Incumbent
- Assumed office January 11, 2023
- Preceded by: Aric Nesbitt

Member of the Michigan Senate
- Incumbent
- Assumed office January 1, 2019
- Preceded by: Vincent Gregory
- Constituency: 11th district (2019–2023); 7th district (2023–present)

Member of the Michigan House of Representatives from the 35th district
- In office January 1, 2015 – January 1, 2019
- Preceded by: Rudy Hobbs
- Succeeded by: Kyra Harris Bolden

Personal details
- Born: Jeremy Allen Moss; June 23, 1986 (age 40) Detroit, Michigan, U.S.
- Party: Democratic
- Education: Michigan State University (BA)
- Website: Campaign website

Jeremy Allen Moss (born June 23, 1986) is an American politician from Southfield, Michigan, currently representing Michigan's 7th Senate district. A member of the Democratic Party, Moss is the first openly gay person elected to the Michigan Senate, and the first to serve as its president pro tempore. Moss represented Michigan's 35th House of Representatives district in the Michigan House of Representatives from 2014 to 2018. Before running for the state legislature, Moss, at age 25, was elected to the Southfield City Council in 2011, becoming the youngest member elected in the body's history.

In 2026 Moss was elected as Michigan’s first openly gay member of Congress.

== Early life and education ==
Jeremy Moss was born on June 23, 1986, in Detroit. He attended Hillel Day School and graduated from Wylie E. Groves High School in the Birmingham Public School District.

He graduated with high honors from Michigan State University with a bachelor's degree in journalism and an additional major in political science. He graduated from the Michigan Political Leadership Program Fellowship.

== Career ==
Moss worked in the offices of Mayor Brenda Lawrence and State Representative Paul Condino. He worked as district director for State Representative Rudy Hobbs after serving as his campaign manager.

In November 2011, at age 25, he placed first among eight candidates to be elected to serve as the youngest-ever elected official in Southfield. He served as chairman of the council's Legislative and Urban Affairs Committee, and as a member of the Boards and Commission and Neighborhood Services committees. In 2013, Moss successfully advocated for the creation of a new Economic Development Committee.

He was elected to serve the 35th District in the Michigan House of Representatives in November 2014. He became the second openly gay member elected to the Michigan legislature.

In his first term in the Michigan House of Representatives, he served as minority vice chairman of the House Local Government Committee and sat on the House Commerce and Trade and House Regulatory Reform committees.

Moss was re-elected in 2016. His colleagues selected him to serve as the House Democratic Whip. In his second term, he served as minority vice chairman of the House Regulatory Reform Committee and sat on the House Elections and Ethics Committee, House Local Government Committee, and the Joint Committee on Administrative Rules.

In 2018, Moss was elected to represent the 11th Michigan Senate District and was the Assistant Democratic Leader. Moss started his second term in the Michigan Senate in 2023, representing district 7.

In 2026 Moss was elected as Michigan’s first openly gay member of Congress.

== Political positions ==
Moss supports Israel and a two-state solution, while opposing Benjamin Netanyahu.

== Personal life ==
Moss is a lifelong resident of Southfield, Michigan. He is a member of the Greater Southfield/Farmington chapter of the National Association for the Advancement of Colored People and the Martin Luther King Task Force, and is a board member of Congregation Beth Ahm in Oakland County.

Moss is Jewish and openly gay. He is a fan of singer and actress Patti LaBelle.

== Electoral history ==
In 2014, he defeated Nicole Brown, Darryle Buchanan, and Charles Roddis in the Democratic primary for the 35th District of the Michigan House of Representatives on August 5, 2014. He then went on to defeat Republican Party candidate Robert Brim in the general election on November 4, 2014. He defeated Brim in a rematch in 2016.

In 2018, Moss defeated Crystal Bailey, Vanessa Moss, and James Turner in the Democratic primary for the 11th State Senate district. He went on to defeat Republican Boris Tuman and Libertarian James Young in the general election.

Following the 2022 redistricting, Moss successfully ran for re-election in the newly drawn 7th Michigan Senate District and served as the Michigan Senate Democratic campaign co-chair as the caucus won its first majority in 40 years.

2022 Michigan State Senate, District 7
Party	Candidate	Votes	%
Democratic	Jeremy Moss	80,597	74.21
Republican	Corinne Khederian	28,008	25.79
Total votes		108,605	100
Democratic hold			

Democratic Primary – 2022 Michigan State Senate, District 7
Party	Candidate	Votes	%
Democratic	Jeremy Moss	32,022	82.95
Democratic	Ryan Foster	6,584	17.05
Total votes		38,606	100

2018 Michigan State Senate, District 11
Party	Candidate	Votes	%
Democratic	Jeremy Moss	97,192	76.43
Republican	Boris Tuman	26,829	21.10
Libertarian	James Young	3,145	2.47
Total votes		127,166	100
Democratic hold			

Democratic Primary – 2018 Michigan State Senate, District 11
Party	Candidate	Votes	%
Democratic	Jeremy Moss	25,712	52.07
Democratic	Crystal Bailey	10,417	21.10
Democratic	Vanessa Moss	9,030	18.29
Democratic	James Turner	4,216	8.54
Total votes		49,375	100

2016 Michigan House of Representatives, District 35
Party	Candidate	Votes	%
Democratic	Jeremy Moss	44,737	83.27%
Republican	Robert Brim	8,639	16.08%
Total votes		53,376	100
Democratic hold			

2014 Michigan House of Representatives, District 35
Party	Candidate	Votes	%
Democratic	Jeremy Moss	31,659	83.02%
Republican	Robert Brim	6,473	16.98%
Total votes		38,132	100
Democratic hold			

Democratic Primary – 2014 Michigan House of Representatives, District 35
Party	Candidate	Votes	%
Democratic	Jeremy Moss	6,541	51.09
Democratic	Nicole Brown	3,507	27.40
Democratic	Darryle Buchanan	1,909	14.91
Democratic	Charles Roddis	844	6.60
Total votes		12,801	100

== See also ==
- Michigan House of Representatives

Michigan Senate
Preceded by Aric Nesbitt	President pro tempore of the Michigan Senate; 2023–present	Incumbent
U.S. House of Representatives
Preceded by Haley Stevens	Member of the U.S. House of Representatives from Michigan's 11th congressional district Taking office 2027	Elect
