= Michigan's 19th House of Representatives district =

American legislative district

Michigan's 19th State House of Representatives district
Representative
Samantha Steckloff; D–Farmington Hills
- Demographics: 59.4% White; 23.2% Black; 2.3% Hispanic; 8.4% Asian; 0.3% Other; 6.4% Multiracial
- Population (2024): 91,985

Michigan's 19th House of Representatives district is a legislative district within the Michigan House of Representatives located in Oakland County. The district was created in 1965, when the Michigan Supreme Court ordered the reapportionment of state legislative districts from a county-based system to a proportional one following the Supreme Court case Reynolds v. Sims. It is currently represented by Democrat Samantha Steckloff of Farmington Hills.

== List of representatives ==
Representative	Party	Dates	Residence	Notes
Joseph J. Kowalski	Democratic	1965–1967	Detroit	Reapportioned from the former Wayne County, 10th district; died March 1967.
Anthony C. Licata	Republican	1967 (Note: Elected in a 1967 special election to replace Rep. Joseph J. Kowalski, who died.)–1968	Detroit	
Casmer P. Ogonowski	Democratic	1969–1972	Detroit	Redistricted to the 3rd district.
Stephen Stopczynski	Democratic	1973–1978	Detroit	Redistricted from the 7th district.
Stanley Stopczynski	Democratic	1979–1982	Detroit	Redistricted to the 11th district.
Donald Van Singel	Republican	1983–1992	Grant	Redistricted from the 99th district.
Lyn R. Bankes	Republican	1993–1998	Livonia (until around 1994); Redford Township	Redistricted from the 35th district; term limited.
Laura M. Toy	Republican	1999–2002	Livonia	
John R. Pastor	Republican	2003–2008	Livonia	Term limited.
John J. Walsh	Republican	2009–2014	Livonia	Term limited.
Laura Cox	Republican	2015–2018	Livonia	
Laurie Pohutsky	Democratic	2019–2022	Livonia	Redistricted to the 17th district.
Samantha Steckloff	Democratic	2023–present	Farmington Hills	Redistricted from the 37th district.

== Historical district boundaries ==
Map	Description	Apportionment Plan	Notes
	Wayne County (part): Detroit (part)	1964 Apportionment Plan (Note: Referred to as the Austin-Kleiner plan.)	
	Wayne County (part): Detroit (part); Hamtramck	1972 Apportionment Plan (Note: Referred to as the Hatcher-Kleiner plan.)	
	Montcalm County; Newaygo County	1982 Apportionment Plan	
	Wayne County (part): Livonia (part); Redford Township (part)	1992 Apportionment Plan	
	Wayne County (part): Livonia (part)	2001 Apportionment Plan	
	Wayne County (part): Livonia (part)	2011 Apportionment Plan	
	Oakland County (part): Birmingham (part); Bloomfield Township (part); Farmington Hills (part); Southfield (part); Southfield Township (part)	2021 Apportionment Plan (Note: Referred to as the Hickory plan.)	

== Recent elections ==
=== 2020s ===
2026 Michigan House of Representatives election
Party	Candidate	Votes	%
Democratic	Samantha Steckloff (incumbent)	34,850	69.41
Republican	Kevin J. Hammer	15,359	30.59
Total votes		50,209	100
Democratic hold			

2024 Michigan House of Representatives election
Party	Candidate	Votes	%
Democratic	Samantha Steckloff (incumbent)	36,538	65.28
Republican	Kevin J. Hammer	19,431	34.72
Total votes		55,969	100
Democratic hold			

2022 Michigan House of Representatives election
Party	Candidate	Votes	%
Democratic	Samantha Steckloff	31,956	67.09
Republican	Anthony Paesano	15,678	32.91
Total votes		47,635	100
Democratic hold			

2020 Michigan House of Representatives election
Party	Candidate	Votes	%
Democratic	Laurie Pohutsky (incumbent)	29,452	50.2
Republican	Martha Ptashnik	29,215	49.8
Total votes		58,667	100
Democratic hold			

=== 2010s ===
2018 Michigan House of Representatives election
Party	Candidate	Votes	%
Democratic	Laurie Pohutsky	23,454	50.24
Republican	Brian Meakin	23,230	49.76
Total votes		46,684	100
Democratic gain from Republican			

2016 Michigan House of Representatives election
Party	Candidate	Votes	%
Republican	Laura Cox (incumbent)	31,045	61.42
Democratic	Steve King	19,504	38.58
Total votes		50,549	100
Republican hold			

2014 Michigan House of Representatives election
Party	Candidate	Votes	%
Republican	Laura Cox	21,614	61.77
Democratic	Stacey Dogonski	13,377	38.23
Total votes		34,991	100
Republican hold			

2012 Michigan House of Representatives election
Party	Candidate	Votes	%
Republican	John J. Walsh (incumbent)	29,151	59.94
Democratic	Richard Tannous	19,480	40.06
Total votes		48,631	100
Republican hold			

2010 Michigan House of Representatives election
Party	Candidate	Votes	%
Republican	John J. Walsh (incumbent)	23,141	66.47
Democratic	Joseph W. Larkin	11,671	33.53
Total votes		34,812	100
Republican hold			

=== 2000s ===
2008 Michigan House of Representatives election
Party	Candidate	Votes	%
Republican	John J. Walsh	29,752	60.01
Democratic	Steve King	19,829	39.99
Total votes		49,581	100
Republican hold			

2006 Michigan House of Representatives election
Party	Candidate	Votes	%
Republican	John R. Pastor (incumbent)	22,632	55.19
Democratic	Brian Duggan	18,377	44.81
Total votes		41,009	100
Republican hold			

2004 Michigan House of Representatives election
Party	Candidate	Votes	%
Republican	John R. Pastor (incumbent)	26,265	53.13
Democratic	Joan A. Gebhardt	23,168	46.87
Total votes		49,433	100
Republican hold			

2002 Michigan House of Representatives election
Party	Candidate	Votes	%
Republican	John R. Pastor	22,170	62.85
Democratic	Kerry L. Lowry	12,210	34.61
Libertarian	Mike Shesterkin	895	2.54
Total votes		35,275	100
Republican hold			

2000 Michigan House of Representatives election
Party	Candidate	Votes	%
Republican	Laura M. Toy (incumbent)	23,546	60.84
Democratic	Michael Burke Sullivan	13,873	35.84
Libertarian	John J. Tatar	1,285	3.32
Total votes		38,704	100
Republican hold			

=== 1990s ===
1998 Michigan House of Representatives election
Party	Candidate	Votes	%
Republican	Laura M. Toy	17,898	61.26
Democratic	Patrick A. McRae	10,259	35.11
Libertarian	John J. Tatar	1,059	3.62
Total votes		29,216	100
Republican hold			
