= Michigan Department of Agriculture and Rural Development =

Michigan state government department

Department overview
- Formed: 1921
- Headquarters: Lansing, Michigan
- Employees: 508 (2018 Fiscal Yr)
- Annual budget: $110.2 million (2019 Fiscal Yr)
- Ministers responsible: Trever Meachum, Commission Vice Chair; Brian Pridgeon, Commission Secretary; Dru Montri, Commissioner; Patti Bergdahl, Commissioner; Charlie Meintz, Commissioner
- Department executives: Dr. Tim Boring, Director; Kenneth McFarlane, Chief Operating Officer; Kathy Angerer, Deputy Director
- Website: michigan.gov/mdard

The Michigan Department of Agriculture and Rural Development (MDARD), formerly the Michigan Department of Agriculture, is a department of the Michigan state government created in 1921 to enforce laws regarding agriculture production and distribution. Agriculture in the State of Michigan is now a $104.7 billion industry. A five-member commission heads the Department with a Director of Agriculture & Rural Development to administer the day-to-day activities.

Under Governor Rick Snyder, MDARD is now part of the "Quality of Life" group within state government, along with the Department of Natural Resources and Department of Environmental Quality.

The mission of the Michigan Department of Agriculture & Rural Development is, "To protect, promote and preserve the food, agricultural, environmental and economic interests of the people of Michigan."

The Michigan Department of Agriculture and Rural Development has six divisions, which work to cultivate and expand new economic opportunities for the food and agricultural sector; safeguard the public’s food supply; inspect and enforce sound animal health practices; control and eradicate plant pests and diseases threatening the food and agriculture system; preserve the environment by which the farming community makes their living and feeds consumers; and protect consumers by enforcing laws relating to weights and measures

== History ==
The Michigan Department of Agriculture & Rural Development (then known only as the Department of Agriculture) was brought into existence in 1921 by the provisions of Act 13 of the Public Acts of 1921. Previous to this time, the regulatory work affecting agriculture was administered by commissions, departments and individuals. The act creating the department brought under one head the administering of all regulatory laws affecting agriculture. Commissions were abolished and all their work turned over to the newly created department.

Along with a proposed merger of the Department of Environmental Quality and Department of Natural Resources, in 2009 former Governor Jennifer Granholm issued an Executive Order making the Department's Director appointed by the Governor instead of the Agriculture Commission. In 2011, then Governor Rick Snyder renamed the department to Department of Agriculture and Rural Development, giving it an expanded mission in the rural areas to include economic, social, and educational.

Director of Michigan Department of Agriculture & Rural Development
- Incumbent; Gary McDowell
- Appointer: Governor of Michigan
- Formation: 1921
- Website: michigan.gov/Meet The Director

== Divisions ==
- Agriculture Development Division
- Animal Industry Division
- Environmental Stewardship Division
- Food and Dairy Division
- Laboratory Division
- Pesticide and Plant Pest Management Division
- MDARD Executive Office
- Human Resources is now part of Quality of Life Group HR Division

== List of directors ==
- John A. Dolle (1921 - 1926)
- L. Whitney Watkins (1926 - 1928)
- Herbert E. Powell (1928 - 1934)
- Samuel T. Metzger (1934 - 1936)
- James F. Thomson (1936 - 1937)
- Burr B. Lincoln (1937 - 1938)
- John B. Strange (1938 - 1940)
- Elmer M. Beamer (1940 - 1942)
- Leo V. Card (1942 - 1944)
- Charles Figy (1944 - 1954)
- George S. McIntyre (1954 - 1966)
- B. Dale Ball (1966 - 1980)
- Dean Pridgeon (1980 - 1983)
- Dr. Paul E. Kindinger (1983 - 1989)
- Robert L. Mitchell (1989 - 1991)
- Bill Schuette (1991 - 1994)
- Dr. Gordon E. Guyer (1994 - 1996)
- Dan Wyant (1996 - 2005)
- Mitch Irwin (2005 - 2007)
- Donald Koivisto (2007 - 2010)
- Keith Creagh (2011 - 2012)
- Jamie Clover Adams (2012 -2018)
- Gordon Wenk (2018 to 2018)
- Gary McDowell (2019 to present)

== Boards and councils ==
- Pesticide Advisory Committee (PAC)
- Michigan Craft Beverage Council
- Fertilizer Research Advisory Committee
- Rural Development Fund Board

== Office of Racing Commissioner ==
Racing Commissioner
- Michigan Department of Agriculture
- Final holder: , acting
- Abolished: 1/17/2010

Executive Order No. 2009 — 45 signed on October 8, 2009 transfer the duties of the Racing Commissioner from MDARD to the Michigan Gaming Control Board and abolishes the office effective January 17, 2010.
