= Louis Mezzano =

American politician

Louis A. Mezzano (June 21, 1918 – March 6, 1992) was an American politician who served in the Michigan House of Representatives from 1945 to 1960, representing the western portion of the state's Upper Peninsula (a district comprising Gogebic County and Ontonagon County). He later served as an official for the United States Customs Service.

== Early life ==
Mezzano was born in Wakefield, Michigan, only about 10 miles (16 km) from the border with Wisconsin, and graduated from Wakefield High School in 1935. He was elected to the city council in 1942, and later served two years as mayor pro tempore. He also served on the board of supervisors for Gogebic County, including a term as chairman.

== Politics ==
In 1944, aged 26, Mezzano was elected to the Michigan House of Representatives, as a representative of the Democratic Party. In July 1950, he was accompanying G. Mennen Williams, the Governor of Michigan, on a tour of the Marquette Branch Prison when the governor was attacked and briefly held hostage by inmates. All together, Mezzano won eight elections (including two unopposed, in 1954 and 1958) before losing to Joseph Mack in the Democratic primary in 1960. He was a Michigan delegate at the 1952, 1956, and 1960 Democratic National Conventions.

== Later life ==
After leaving state politics, Mezzano received a federal government appointment to the United States Customs Service, becoming the collector of customs for Detroit. He and his family consequently relocated from Wakefield to St. Clair Shores. In 1966, as part of a reorganization of the service, Mezzano was instead made director of the Customs District of Michigan. In this new position he had responsibility for the whole state except Menominee and Isle Royale.
