= Jennifer Wortz =

American politician

Member of the Michigan House of Representatives from the 35th district
- Incumbent
- Assumed office January 1, 2025
- Preceded by: Andrew Fink

Personal details
- Born: Hillsdale County, Michigan
- Party: Republican
- Spouse: Nathan
- Education: Michigan State University

Jennifer Wortz (née Leininger) is an American politician serving as a member of the Michigan House of Representatives since January 2025, representing the 35th district. She is a member of the Republican Party.

== Early life ==
She was born in Hillsdale County, Michigan. She is the daughter of former Hillsdale County Treasurer and current Hillsdale County Road Commissioner Gary Leininger and former school board member Bonnie Leininger.

== Career ==
Wortz owns a chicken farm named Central Grace Farms in Quincy, Michigan. She is a former member of the Quincy school board having served from 2017 to 2019, and is currently the vice chair of the Branch County Republican Party. she is also the founder of Branch County Moms for Liberty and was its chair from 2021 to 2023. in 2021 the group sued the Branch-Hillsdale-St. Joseph Community Health Agency for its COVID-19 quarantine orders. However, a federal court later dismissed the case. In 2024, she ran for 35th district of the Michigan House of Representatives to replace Andrew Fink, who ran for a seat on the Michigan Supreme Court. She won the Republican primary, defeating Hillsdale mayor Adam Stockford and Branch County Commissioner Tom Matthew with 52% of the vote, and would later defeat her Democratic opponent Don Hicks by 74% to 26%.

== Personal life ==
Her brother is the Hillsdale County Commissioner and Waldron School board member Brent Leininger who also chairs Hillsdale County Republican Party Executive Committee.
