= Laura Cox (politician) =

American politician from Michigan

Chair of the Michigan Republican Party
- In office February 23, 2019 – February 6, 2021
- Preceded by: Ronald Weiser
- Succeeded by: Ronald Weiser

Member of the Michigan House of Representatives from the 19th district
- In office January 1, 2015 – January 1, 2019
- Preceded by: John J. Walsh
- Succeeded by: Laurie Pohutsky

Personal details
- Born: August 7, 1964 (age 62) Jackson, Michigan, U.S.
- Party: Republican
- Spouse: Mike Cox
- Children: 4
- Education: Michigan State University (BA)

Laura Cox (born August 7, 1964) is an American politician from Michigan. Cox is a former Republican member of Michigan House of Representatives, and the former chairwoman of the Michigan Republican Party.

== Education ==
Cox has an undergraduate degree in criminal justice and a master's degree in criminal justice research and planning from Michigan State University.

== Career ==
Cox was a United States Customs Service special agent for 13 years.

In 2004, Cox was first elected to the Wayne County Commission, where she served until 2014. Cox chaired the Ways and Means Committee. Cox has been the 11th Congressional District chairperson, treasurer to the Wayne 11th Congressional District Republican Committee, and on the Michigan Republican State Committee as a member of the Policy Committee, Women for Bush 2008 Co-Chair, and as a delegate at-large to the 2012 Republican National Convention.

On November 4, 2014, Cox won the election and became a Republican member of the Michigan House of Representatives for District 19. Cox defeated Stacey Dogonski with 61.77% of the votes. On November 8, 2016, as an incumbent, Cox won the election and continued serving District 19. Cox defeated Steve King with 61.42% of the votes.

On November 6, 2018, Cox ran for the Michigan Senate seat for District 7 but lost the election. Cox received 47.33% of the votes and she was defeated by Dayna Polehanki with 50.56% of the votes.

In 2018, Cox was endorsed for State GOP chair by campaign manager Brad Parscale. On February 23, 2019, Cox was named the chair person of Michigan Republican Party. Cox's co-chair is Terry Bowman.

=== 2020 presidential election ===
After Joe Biden won the 2020 presidential election, President Donald Trump refused to concede and made baseless claims of fraud. Cox called for delaying the certification of election results in Michigan. Her complaints about the election results focused solely on Wayne County, Michigan's largest and most Democratic county. Cox falsely claimed that Republican poll watchers were prevented from observing the ballot counting in Detroit; in fact, there were more than 134 Republican poll watchers in the TCF Center in Detroit, where ballots were counted. Describing Cox's comments on Republican poll watchers in Politico, Tim Alberta wrote "Truly egregious was Cox's dishonesty."

== Personal life ==
Cox is married to Mike Cox, a former attorney general of Michigan. They have four children. Cox and her family live in Livonia, Michigan.

== See also ==
- 2014 Michigan House of Representatives election
- 2016 Michigan House of Representatives election

Party political offices
Preceded by Ron Weiser	Chair of the Michigan Republican Party; 2019–2021	Succeeded by Ron Weiser
Party political offices
Preceded by John J. Walsh	Member of the Michigan House of Representatives for the 19th district 2015–2019	Succeeded by Laurie Pohutsky
