= Jack Kirksey =

American politician (1928–2026)

Member of the Michigan House of Representatives from the 35th district
- In office 1977–1984

Personal details
- Born: November 21, 1928 Atlanta, Georgia, U.S.
- Died: October 13, 2026 (aged 97)
- Party: Republican
- Children: 3
- Education: Wayne State University
- Occupation: School principal, probation officer

Jack Edwin Kirksey (November 21, 1928 – October 13, 2026) was an American politician from the state of Michigan. He served in the Michigan House of Representatives from 1977 to 1984. Kirksey also served as Assistant Wayne County Executive from 1985–1987 and mayor of Livonia, Michigan from 1995 to 2003, and from 2008 to 2015.

Kirksey died in 2026 at the age of 97.
