= Sue Shink =

American politician

Member of the Michigan Senate from the 14th district
- Incumbent
- Assumed office January 1, 2023
- Preceded by: Ruth Johnson (redistricted)

Personal details
- Party: Democratic

Sue Shink is an American politician who currently represents Michigan's 14th Senate district in the Michigan Senate. She was elected in the 2022 Michigan Senate election. She is a member of the Democratic Party.

== Political career ==
Shink started her political career as a trustee of Northfield Township. She was then elected as a Democrat to the Washtenaw County Board of Commissioners in 2018, and re-elected in 2020.

=== Michigan Senate ===
Shink ran for Michigan's 14th Senate district in the 2022 Michigan Senate election. The district had been redrawn to include parts of Jackson County and Washtenaw County, and voted for Democrat Joe Biden in 2020 by around 10 percentage points. Shink won the election over Republican Tim Golding with around 56% of the vote. The election was the most expensive race in Washtenaw County in 2022.

== Electoral history ==
2018 Washtenaw County 2nd Commission District Democratic primary election
Party	Candidate	Votes	%
Democratic	Sue Shink	3,945	66.53%
Democratic	Tom Brennan	1,109	18.70%
Democratic	Rodrick K. Green	865	14.59%
Write-in		11	0.19%
Total votes		5,930	100%

2018 Washtenaw County 2nd Commission District election
Party	Candidate	Votes	%
Democratic	Sue Shink	11,434	58.43%
Republican	Kevin Jardine	8,104	41.41%
Write-in		32	0.16%
Total votes		19,570	100%
Democratic hold			

2020 Washtenaw County 2nd Commission District election
Party	Candidate	Votes	%
Democratic	Sue Shink	13,805	55.62%
Republican	Scott Inman	10,345	41.68%
Green	Eric Borregard	660	2.66%
Write-in		11	0.04%
Total votes		24,821	100%
Democratic hold			

2022 Michigan's 14th Senate district Democratic primary election
Party	Candidate	Votes	%
Democratic	Sue Shink	21,565	67.71%
Democratic	Kelsey Heck Wood	8,670	27.22%
Democratic	Val Cochran Toops	1,612	5.06%
Total votes		31,847	100%

2022 Michigan's 14th Senate district election
Party	Candidate	Votes	%
Democratic	Sue Shink	68,608	55.89%
Republican	Tim Golding	54,142	44.11%
Total votes		122,750	100%
Democratic gain from Republican			
