= W. F. Doyle =

American politician

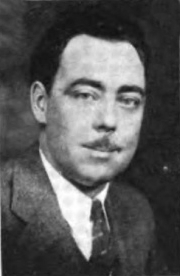
Michigan State Senator W. F. Doyle

Wilfird Francis Doyle (first name often spelled Wilfred) (November 13, 1897 – January 16, 1988) was a politician in the state of Michigan.

== Biography ==
Doyle was born in Green Bay, Wisconsin, on November 13, 1897. His father, Michael, served in the Michigan House of Representatives from 1891 to 1892. An older brother, Thurman, was a member of the Michigan Democratic State Central Committee. He died on January 16, 1988, at a nursing home in Wilton Manors, Florida and was buried in Mackinac Island, Michigan. Doyle was a Roman Catholic.

== Career ==
Doyle was a member of the Michigan State Senate, where he represented the 10th district as a Republican, from 1933 to 1934. He was a newspaper reporter by trade. Doyle was the park commissioner for Mackinaw Island; he was on the commission from 1939 to 1985 and was nicknamed "King of Mackinac Island."
