= John R. Pastor =

American politician

Member of the Michigan House of Representatives from the 19th district
- In office January 8, 2003 – December 31, 2008
- Preceded by: Laura M. Toy
- Succeeded by: John J. Walsh

Personal details
- Born: February 3, 1962 (age 64)
- Party: Republican
- Education: Ferris State University

John R. Pastor (born December 22, 1951) is a former Michigan politician.

== Early life ==
Pastor was born on February 3, 1962.

== Education ==
Pastor earned a B.A. from Ferris State University.

== Career ==
Pastor has worked as a building contractor, and has served on the Livonia City Council. On November 5, 2002, Pastor was elected to the Michigan House of Representatives where he represented the 19th district from January 8, 2003 to December 31, 2008.
