= Gilda Jacobs =

American politician from Michigan

Member of the Michigan Senate from the 14th district
- In office 2003–2010
- Preceded by: Gary Peters
- Succeeded by: Vincent Gregory

Member of the Michigan House of Representatives from the 35th district
- In office 1999–2002
- Preceded by: David Gubow
- Succeeded by: Paul Condino

Personal details
- Born: April 1, 1949 (age 77)
- Party: Democratic
- Spouse: John Jacobs
- Education: University of Michigan
- Profession: Educator, public administration

Gilda Z. Jacobs (born April 1, 1949) is a former Democratic member of the Michigan Senate, representing the 14th district from 2003 through 2010. The mostly suburban district is in southeastern Oakland County, and includes the cities of Farmington Hills, Huntington Woods, Southfield, and Oak Park. Jacobs was a member of the Michigan House of Representatives from 1999 to 2002.

She served as president and CEO of the Michigan League for Public Policy from 2011 through 2021. In 2019 she was inducted into the Michigan Women's Hall of Fame.

== Early life ==
Senator Jacobs graduated from the University of Michigan, received her bachelor's degree in science with a distinction in education in 1970 and a master's degree in behavioral sciences in education in 1971. She was a special education teacher in the Madison School District until the late 1980s.

== Political career ==
Jacobs was the first woman elected to the Huntington Woods City Commission, serving from 1981 to 1994. She was the mayor pro tem of Huntington Woods in 1993–1994 and served as Oakland County Commissioner from 1995 to 1998. She was elected to the Michigan State House of Representatives in 1998, where she served for two terms. She represented the 35th district, which includes most of the city of Southfield. While in the House, she made history by being the first female floor leader in either House of the legislature.

In 2002, she ran for the open state senate seat being vacated by Senator Gary Peters. She won in a landslide in the heavily Democratic 14th district. She served as the chair of the Senate Democratic Caucus. She was the vice-chair of the Economic Development, Small Business & Regulatory Reform Committee and the Families and Human Services Committee and also served on Government Operations and Health Policy Committees. There was early speculation that Jacobs might challenge Rep. Joe Knollenberg, but she decided against it and endorsed her predecessor in the State Senate, Gary Peters. Due to Michigan's term limits, Jacobs was not eligible to run for re-election in 2010, and she was succeeded by Vincent Gregory, a Democrat from Southfield.

== Personal life ==
Jacobs and her husband, John, have one living daughter. Another daughter, Rachel, was killed in the 2015 Philadelphia train derailment. In 2003, the Democratic Leadership Council named her one of the 100 New Democrats to Watch, a list of up-and-coming Democratic politicians. She is a member of Triangle Foundation's Board of Advisors.

== Electoral history ==
- 2006 Election for the Michigan State Senate - 14th District

Name	Percent
Gilda Jacobs (D)	73%
Tara Bellingar (R)	27%

- 2002 Election for the Michigan State Senate - 14th District

Name	Percent
Gilda Jacobs (D)	68%
Marc Wilkins (R)	32%

- 2000 Election for the Michigan State House - 35th District

Name	Percent
Gilda Jacobs (D)	55%
Aaron Samson (R)	45%

- 1998 Election for the Michigan State House - 35th District

Name	Percent
Gilda Jacobs (D)	70%
Cecilio Maldonado (R)	30%
