= Rudy Hobbs =

American politician (born 1976)

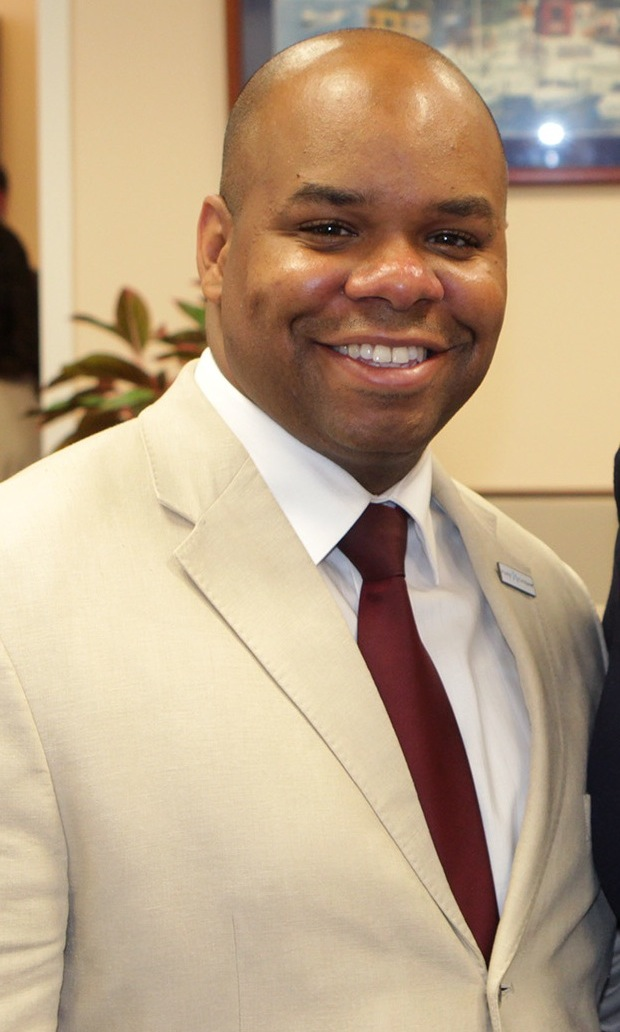
- Hobbs in 2013

Member of the Michigan House of Representatives from the 35th district
- In office January 1, 2011 – December 31, 2014
- Preceded by: Vincent Gregory
- Succeeded by: Jeremy Moss

Personal details
- Born: Detroit, Michigan, U.S.
- Party: Democratic

Rudy Hobbs (born 1976) is an American politician from the state of Michigan. He is a member of the Democratic Party and a former member of Michigan House of Representatives.

Hobbs was born in Alabama and raised on the east side of Detroit. He later moved to Southfield, Michigan, graduating from Southfield Lathrup High School. He then studied at Alabama State University and Michigan State University. He married his wife Dedra while a student at MSU. He taught first grade in the Detroit Public School System. He began to volunteer in politics, and was hired by Sander Levin's office.

Hobbs was elected to the Michigan House in the 35th district in 2010. In 2014, he lost his bid for the United States House of Representatives in Michigan's 14th congressional district, which was being vacated by Gary Peters.
