= Vincent Gregory =

American politician (born 1948)

Member of the Michigan Senate
- In office 2011–2019
- Preceded by: Gilda Jacobs
- Succeeded by: Jeremy Moss
- Constituency: 14th district (2011–2014); 11th district (2015–2019)

Member of the Michigan House of Representatives from the 35th district
- In office 2009–2011
- Preceded by: Paul Condino
- Succeeded by: Rudy Hobbs

Personal details
- Born: July 20, 1948 Detroit, Michigan
- Died: October 21, 2022 (aged 74) Southfield, Michigan
- Party: Democratic
- Spouse: Yvonne Gregory
- Profession: Detective (retired)

Vincent "Vince" Gregory (July 20, 1948 – October 21, 2022) was an American law enforcement officer and politician who served as a member of the Michigan Senate from 2011 to 2019. A member of the Democratic Party, Gregory served as a member of the Michigan House of Representatives from 2009 to 2011. He also served as a deputy in the Wayne County Sheriff's Department for 30 years, and was the Democratic nominee for Oakland County Sheriff in 2020.

== Biography ==
Gregory was born in Detroit, Michigan, on July 20, 1948, in Detroit, Michigan, to African American parents Laurence and Dorothy Gregory. The second eldest of five children, he had three brothers, Laurence, Timothy, and Delbert, and a sister, Patricia. He attended Dundee High School in Dundee, Michigan, in Monroe County. After graduating from high school in 1966, he began attending Madonna University, a Catholic college in Livonia, Michigan.

In April 1968, Gregory's schooling was interrupted when he was drafted into the United States Marine Corps. He was shipped to Vietnam in November 1968, where he would serve until November 1969. Gregory was honorably discharged In 1970.

In 1973, Gregory joined the Wayne County Sheriff's Department, where he attained the rank of Corporal and then Detective. In 1983, he was elected vice president of the Local 502 SEIU, AFL-CIO Union. He ran for president of the Union in 1993, won, and served as president until 2000. In 2003, he retired from the Wayne County Sheriff's Department.

In 2005, Gregory returned to Madonna University to complete his schooling that was interrupted by his service in Vietnam. He graduated with a Bachelor of Science Degree in Criminal Justice in May 2006.

Gregory married his wife, Yvonne, in 1978. They lived in Southfield and had six children, Lawrence, Troi, Vanessa, Vincent II (deceased), Cortney, and Kristen. They had five grandchildren.

== Political career ==
In 1998, Gregory ran for a seat on the Oakland County Board of Commissioners. He won and served as Commissioner for the 21st district, which included northeast Southfield, Lathrup Village, and Berkley.

In 2008, Gregory announced his candidacy for the 35th State House district, vacated by fellow Democrat Paul Condino, who was term limited. The district included Southfield, Lathrup Village, Royal Oak Township and part of Oak Park. Gregory won the Democratic Primary with about 60% of the vote and went on to easily defeat Republican Katie Koppin in the 2008 General Election. He received 41,017 votes, more than any other candidate for the Michigan House of Representatives. The 35th district is majority African American and overwhelmingly Democratic.

After one term in the state house, Gregory was elected to the Michigan Senate, succeeding term-limited Democrat Gilda Jacobs. In 2013, Gregory announced his candidacy for U.S Congress from Michigan's 14th congressional district, but withdrew from the race in April 2014.

In 2018, there was speculation that he would be the running mate of then candidate for governor, Gretchen Whitmer, but Garlin Gilchrist was chosen instead.

Gregory was a candidate for Oakland County Sheriff in the 2020 general election.

== Electoral history ==
- 2008 election for State House
  - Vincent Gregory (D), 88%
  - Katie Koppin (R), 11%
- 2008 Democratic Primary election for State House
  - Vincent Gregory (D), 60%
  - Faith Shepherd (D), 34%
