= Redistricting in Michigan =

Redistricting in Michigan is the process of drawing electoral district boundaries for Michigan's representatives in the United States House of Representatives. Redistricting occurs after each ten-year census, when the number of representatives (and thus number of districts) that Michigan is entitled to may change.

== History ==
=== 20th century ===
Republicans held legislative control of the redistricting process throughout most of the 19th and 20th centuries, with Democrats holding control only in the redistricting cycles following the census of 1850, 1890, 1970, 1980 and 1990.

==== 1990s ====
Following the 1990 United States census, Michigan lost the 18th and 17th districts.

=== 21st century ===
==== 2000s ====
Following the 2000 United States census, Michigan lost the 16th district. Republicans held control of the redistricting process.

==== 2010s ====
Following the 2010 United States census, Michigan lost the 15th district. Republicans held control of the redistricting process, using the REDMAP plan to maximize gains in legislative and congressional maps.

In 2018, voters approved of a proposal to establish an independent redistricting commission for congressional and state legislative districts for Michigan.

==== 2020s ====
Following the 2020 United States census, Michigan lost the 14th district. Despite retaining legislative majorities in the 2020 elections, Republican legislators no longer controlled the redistricting process, as the Michigan Independent Citizens Redistricting Commission was convened to redraw legislative and congressional maps. The new district lines resulted in Detroit failing to elect a black member of Congress for the first time in nearly 70 years.

On March 23, 2022, a group of nineteen African-American Detroiters who live in thirteen different Michigan House and Senate districts in portions of Detroit sued the MICRC for violating the Equal Protection Clause of the United States Constitution and the Voting Rights Act. On December 21, 2023, a three-judge panel of the United States District Court for the Western District of Michigan determined in Agee v. Benson that the MICRC "overwhelmingly - indeed, inescapably" drew the boundaries of the plaintiffs' districts predominantly on the basis for race. The three-judge panel enjoined further use of the Michigan House and Michigan Senate maps drawn by the MICRC and ordered the maps to be redrawn.
