= Don Koivisto =

American politician from Michigan (1949–2025)

Director of the Michigan Department of Agriculture
- In office September 5, 2007 – December 31, 2010
- Governor: Jennifer Granholm
- Preceded by: Mitch Irwin
- Succeeded by: Keith Creagh

Member of the Michigan Senate from the 38th district
- In office November 13, 1990 – December 31, 2002
- Preceded by: Joseph Mack
- Succeeded by: Michael Prusi

Member of the Michigan House of Representatives from the 110th district
- In office January 1, 1981 – December 31, 1986
- Preceded by: Russell Hellman
- Succeeded by: Richard A. Sofio

Personal details
- Born: August 18, 1949 Ironwood, Michigan, U.S.
- Died: October 7, 2025 (aged 76) Traverse City, Michigan, U.S.
- Party: Democratic
- Education: Central Michigan University

Donald W. Koivisto (August 18, 1949 – October 7, 2025) was an American Democratic politician from the state of Michigan.

== Political career ==
Koivisto was elected to the Michigan House of Representatives in 1980. During his time there, he chaired the Agriculture Committee and helped write the state's right-to-farm act. In 1990, Koivisto was elected a Michigan State Senator from the 38th district, succeeding Joe Mack, who had represented much of the Upper Peninsula since 1960. Koivisto served as state senator until 2003 when he was term-limited. In August 2007, the Michigan Commission of Agriculture appointed Koivisto as Director of the Michigan Department of Agriculture.

== Death ==
Koivisto died of complications from Parkinson's disease on October 7, 2025, at the age of 76. Flags were lowered at the Michigan State Capitol in his honor on October 21.
