= Michigan's 14th Senate district =

American legislative district

Michigan's 14th State Senate district
Senator
Sue Shink; D–Northfield Township
- Demographics: 78.8% White; 5.9% Black; 4.2% Hispanic; 4.9% Asian; 0.2% Native American; 0.4% Other; 5.7% Multiracial
- Population (2024): 268,831

Michigan's 14th Senate district is one of 38 districts in the Michigan Senate. The 14th district was created by the 1850 Michigan Constitution, as the 1835 constitution only permitted a maximum of eight senate districts. It has been represented by Democratic Sue Shink since 2023, succeeding Republican Ruth Johnson.

== Geography ==
District 14 encompasses all of Jackson County, as well as part of Washtenaw County.

=== 2011 Apportionment Plan ===
District 14, as dictated by the 2011 Apportionment Plan, was split between southern Genesee County outside of Flint and northwestern Oakland County in the exurbs of Detroit. Communities in the district included Waterford Township, Highland Township, Springfield Township, Brandon Township, Holly Township (including the village of Holly), Fenton, Mundy Township, the city and township of Davison, and the city and township of Grand Blanc.

The district overlapped with Michigan's 5th, 8th, and 11th congressional districts, and with the 43rd, 44th, 46th, 48th, 50th, and 51st districts of the Michigan House of Representatives.

== List of senators ==
Senator	Party	Dates	Residence	Notes
Nathan Pierce	Whig	1853–1854	Marengo	
William H. Brockway	Republican	1855–1856	Albion	
Edmund Burke Fairfield	Republican	1857–1858	Hillsdale	
Ebenezer O. Grosvenor	Republican	1859–1860	Jonesville	
John McDermid	Republican	1861–1862	Cambria Mills	
Ebenezer O. Grosvenor	Republican	1863–1864	Jonesville	
Frederick Fowler	Republican	1865–1866	Reading	
Jonathan G. Wait	Republican	1867–1868	Sturgis	
Abraham C. Prutzman	Republican	1869–1872	Three Rivers	
Mark D. Wilber	Republican	1873–1874	Allegan	
Henry F. Thomas	Republican	1875–1876	Allegan	
Wilson C. Edsell	Republican	1877–1878	Otsego	
Nathaniel W. Lewis	Greenback	1879–1880	Ganges	Lewis was a Democrat, but was elected to the state senate as a Greenbacker.
Wilson C. Edsell	Republican	1881–1882	Otsego	
Henry H. Jenison	Democratic	1883–1884	Eagle	
Orrin G. Pennell	Greenback	1885–1886	Oxford	Elected on a fusion ticket, also endorsed by the Democrats.
Charles I. Deyo	Greenback	1887–1888	Oxford	Elected on a fusion ticket, also endorsed by the Democrats.
Franklin B. Galbraith	Republican	1889–1890	Pontiac	
Charles B. Boughner	Democratic	1891–1892	Pontiac	
Schuyler Champion	Democratic	1893–1894	Lansing	Also endorsed by the Populists.
William M. Kilpatrick	Republican	1895–1896	Owosso	
Henry S. Hadsall	Democratic	1897–1898	Owosso	Elected on a Democratic, Populist and free silver ticket.
Charles B. Collingwood	Republican	1899–1900	Lansing	
John Robson	Republican	1901–1902	Lansing	
Albert B. Cook	Republican	1903–1906	Owosso	
Arthur J. Tuttle	Republican	1907–1910	Leslie	
William A. Rosenkrans	Republican	1911–1914	Corunna	
Charles W. Foster	Republican	1915–1918	Lansing	
Byron P. Hicks	Republican	1919–1922	Owosso	Lived in Durand until around 1921.
Frank L. Young	Republican	1923–1926	Lansing	
Seymour H. Person	Republican	1927–1930	Lansing	
Joe C. Foster	Republican	1931–1934	East Lansing	
Harry F. Hittle	Republican	1935–1957	East Lansing	Lived in Lansing from around 1949 to 1952. Died in office.
Paul C. Younger	Republican	1957–1964	Lansing	
Paul M. Chandler	Republican		Livonia	Elected in 1964, died before taking office.
Farrell E. Roberts	Republican	1965–1966	Pontiac	
George W. Kuhn	Republican	1967–1970	Birmingham	
Carl Pursell	Republican	1971–1977	Plymouth	Resigned after elected to the U.S. House of Representatives.
R. Robert Geake	Republican	1977–1982	Northville	
Jerome T. Hart	Democratic	1983–1990	Saginaw	
Jon Cisky	Republican	1991–1994	Thomas Township	
Gary Peters	Democratic	1995–2002	Bloomfield Township	Also resided in Pontiac.
Gilda Jacobs	Democratic	2003–2010	Huntington Woods	
Vincent Gregory	Democratic	2011–2014	Southfield	
David B. Robertson	Republican	2015–2018	Grand Blanc	
Ruth Johnson	Republican	2019–2022	Holly	
Sue Shink	Democratic	2023–present	Northfield Township	

== Recent election results ==
=== 2020s ===
2026 Michigan Senate election
Primary election
Party	Candidate	Votes	%
Democratic	Sue Shink (incumbent)	43,462	100
Total votes		43,462	100
Republican	Tawn Shawnelle Beliger	19,659	100
Total votes		19,659	100
General election
Democratic	Sue Shink (incumbent)	79,201	60.49
Republican	Tawn Shawnelle Beliger	51,736	39.51
Total votes		130,937	100
Democratic hold			

2022 Michigan Senate election, District 14
Primary election
Party	Candidate	Votes	%
Democratic	Sue Shink	21,565	67.7
Democratic	Kelsey Heck Wood	8,670	27.2
Democratic	Val Cochran Toops	1,612	5.1
Total votes		31,847	100
General election
Democratic	Sue Shink	68,609	55.9
Republican	Tim Golding	54,143	44.1
Total votes		122,752	100
Democratic gain from Republican			

=== 2018 ===
2018 Michigan Senate election, District 14
Primary election
Party	Candidate	Votes	%
Republican	Ruth Johnson	20,958	76.6
Republican	Katherine Houston	6,398	23.4
Total votes		27,356	100
Democratic	Renee Watson	16,569	71.3
Democratic	Cris Rariden	4,269	18.4
Democratic	Jason Waisanen	2,408	10.4
Total votes		23,246	100
General election
Republican	Ruth Johnson	64,253	55.7
Democratic	Renee Watson	48,578	42.1
Green	Jessica Smith	2,580	2.2
Total votes		115,411	100
Republican hold			

=== 2014 ===
2014 Michigan Senate election, District 14
Primary election
Party	Candidate	Votes	%
Democratic	Bobbie Walton	6,807	63.6
Democratic	Tim Terpening	3,891	36.4
Total votes		10,698	100
General election
Republican	David Robertson (incumbent)	46,826	57.6
Democratic	Bobbie Walton	34,502	42.4
Total votes		81,328	100
Republican hold			

=== Federal and statewide results ===
Year	Office	Results
2020	President	Trump 54.8 – 43.5%
2018	Senate	James 52.7 – 45.4%
2018	Governor	Schuette 49.6 – 47.4%
2016	President	Trump 55.7 – 38.9%
2014	Senate	Peters 49.8 – 45.7%
2014	Governor	Snyder 56.5 – 41.2%
2012	President	Romney 51.4 – 47.7%
2012	Senate	Stabenow 53.4 – 42.9%

== Historical district boundaries ==
Map	Description	Apportionment Plan	Notes
	Oakland County (part); Commerce Township; Farmington; Farmington Township; Groveland Township; Highland Township; Holly Township; Keego Harbor; Lyon Township; Milford Township; Northville; Novi Township; Orchard Lake Village; Rose Township; South Lyon; Springfield Township; Sylvan Lake; Walled Lake; West Bloomfield Township; White Lake Township; Wixom; Wayne County (part); Livonia; Northville; Northville Township; Plymouth; Plymouth Township	1964 Apportionment Plan	
	Wayne County (part); Livonia; Northville (part); Northville Township; Plymouth; Plymouth Township; Redford Township; Westland (part)	1972 Apportionment Plan	
	Saginaw County	1982 Apportionment Plan	
	Oakland County (part); Berkley; Bloomfield Township; Lathrup Village; Oak Park; Pontiac; Royal Oak Township; Southfield; Southfield Township	1992 Apportionment Plan	
	Oakland County (part); Farmington; Farmington Hills; Ferndale; Hazel Park; Huntington Woods; Lathrup Village; Oak Park; Pleasant Ridge; Royal Oak Township; Southfield; Southfield Township	2001 Apportionment Plan	
	Genesee County (part); Atlas Township; Davison; Davison Township; Fenton; Grand Blanc; Grand Blanc Township; Mundy Township; Oakland County (part); Brandon Township; Fenton; Groveland Township; Highland Township; Holly Township; Lake Angelus; Rose Township; Springfield Township; Waterford Township	2011 Apportionment Plan	
