= Jon Cisky =

American politician

Jon A. Cisky

Member of the Michigan Senate
- In office January 1, 1991 – December 31, 1998
- Preceded by: Jerome T. Hart
- Succeeded by: Michael Goschka
- Constituency: 14th district (1991–1994); 33rd district (1995–1998)

Personal details
- Born: Jon Ayres Cisky; September 6, 1941 (age 84) Saginaw, Michigan, U.S.
- Party: Republican
- Children: 2
- Education: Saginaw Valley State University
- Occupation: Professor
- Profession: Law enforcement

Jon Ayres Cisky (born September 6, 1941) is an American former politician in the state of Michigan.

A native of Saginaw, Michigan, Cisky was a professor at Saginaw Valley State University in the Department of Criminal Justice. Cisky is also a former sergeant in the St. Clair County Sheriff Department. In 1984, Cisky founded Crime Stoppers for the State of Michigan. He served in the Michigan Senate from 1991 to 1998, serving districts 14 and 33 as a Republican. In 2006, he was granted professor emeritus status at SVSU. He is married with two children.
