= Thomas L. Hickner =

American politician

Bay County Executive
- In office January 1, 1993 – December 31, 2016
- Preceded by: Office created
- Succeeded by: Jim Barcia

Member of the Michigan House of Representatives from the 101st district
- In office January 1, 1983 – December 31, 1992
- Preceded by: Jim Barcia
- Succeeded by: Howard Wetters

Personal details
- Born: February 27, 1954 (age 72) Fort Eustis, Virginia
- Party: Democratic
- Spouse: Nancy
- Education: Western Michigan University (M.B.A.); Michigan State University (B.A.)

Thomas L. Hickner is a United States Democratic politician from Michigan and the former county executive of Bay County. He previously served five terms in the Michigan House of Representatives.

Hickner graduated from Michigan State University in 1979 with a degree in political science and from Western Michigan University with a master's degree in business administration. He worked for Congressman J. Bob Traxler and State Senator Jerome T. Hart before joining the Senate Fiscal Agency in 1979.

Hickner was elected to the House in 1982 and served ten years. He was elected Bay County Executive in 1992 and was re-elected five times, serving until 2016. In 2016, he ran for re-election to a sixth term, but lost the Democratic primary to former Congressman and State Senator Jim Barcia, who went on to win the general election unopposed.
