= Schoolcraft College =

Public college in Livonia, Michigan, US

Coordinates: 42°25′12″N 83°25′48″W

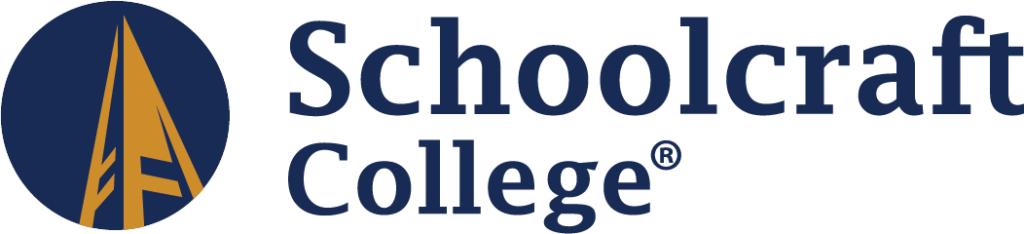
- Motto: "Semper Altius Aspice."
- Type: Public community college
- Established: 1961
- Endowment: US$10.659 million
- President: Glenn R. Cerny, Ed.D.
- Academic staff: 779
- Students: 13,019, (FT) 5,709, (PT) 7,310
- Location: Livonia, Michigan, U.S.
- Campus: Small city, 139 acres (56 ha)
- Colors: Blue, gold
- Sporting affiliations: NJCAA
- Mascot: Ocelot
- Website: schoolcraft.edu

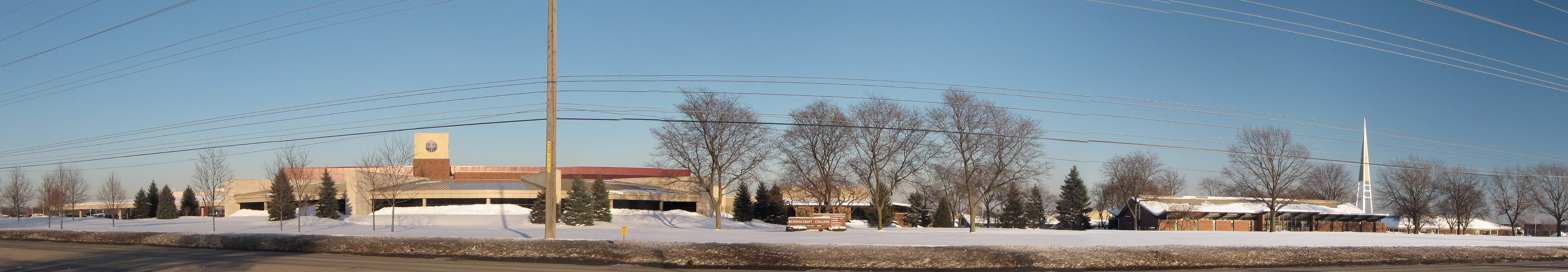
College from Haggerty Road

Schoolcraft College is a public community college in Livonia, Michigan. It was established in 1961 as Northwest Wayne County Community College and renamed in 1963 in honor of Henry Schoolcraft. Its programs include culinary arts, continuing education, business, and public safety. It has two satellite campuses.

== History ==
Schoolcraft College was established in 1961. Originally named Northwest Wayne County Community College, the name of the college was changed because of the length. On February 6, 1963, the college officially changed the name to Schoolcraft College, after an American geologist Henry Schoolcraft. The school's name omits the word "community", both to keep the name short, and to avoid the assumption on the part of the public that the school is located in or associated with Schoolcraft County.

== Academics ==
Schoolcraft College is known for its culinary arts program and continuing education. The culinary department is headed by four certified master chefs (CMC) which is the highest CMC/Student ratio of any culinary school in the country. That department is housed in the Vistatech Center, which underwent an $11 million renovation to improve spaces such as the American Harvest restaurant and reopened in fall 2023.

The Schoolcraft Connection is the student-run campus newspaper.

In addition to its main campus off Haggerty Road, Schoolcraft College also operates two other academic sites. Its Public Safety Training Complex is located on Industrial Road in Livonia and is where students learn skills for both policing and firefighting. It is also the home to the Wayne County Regional Police Academy.

The college also operates its Manufacturing and Engineering Center along Merriman Road south of I-96. This facility houses programs such as advanced manufacturing, welding and more.

The college formerly operated a satellite campus, the Radcliff Center, in Garden City. That campus was closed in 2022 and sold to Garden City.

== Athletics ==
Schoolcraft College Athletic program is a part of the National Junior College Athletic Association via the Michigan Community College Athletic Association. The athletic teams' name is the Ocelots.

== Administration ==
Some noteworthy public figures have served on the Schoolcraft College Board of Trustees including Congressman Thaddeus McCotter of Livonia and former State Senator Laura M. Toy of Livonia. The value of its endowment as of June 30, 2011 was $10.659 million.

== Business engagement ==
Schoolcraft College's Business Development Center hosts several programs for regional businesses. The center is composed of the Schoolcraft College Procurement Technical Assistance Center (PTAC), the Small Business Development Center (SBDC) of Schoolcraft College, and Workforce Training Solutions.

=== Schoolcraft College Procurement Technical Assistance Center (PTAC) ===
The Schoolcraft College PTAC is funded through a cooperative agreement with the United States Department of Defense, State of Michigan and Schoolcraft College. The PTAC provides free government contracting assistance to businesses in selling products and services to federal, state, and local government agencies. The Center assists companies headquartered in Oakland County and most of Wayne County, excluding the City of Detroit and Downriver Communities.

The Schoolcraft College PTAC operates satellite offices at Automation Alley and the Oakland County government's One Stop Shop Business Center.

==== Public Sector Construction Forum (PSCF) ====
The Public Sector Construction Forum (PSCF) was established in 2016 with the support and assistance of the Schoolcraft College PTAC and Wayne State University PTAC. The Forum engages local public and private sector representatives, including small business owners. The Forum discusses industry trends, federal and state spending, contractor diversity and methods to expand the success of public sector construction - both vertical and horizontal - from a stakeholder and private industry perspective throughout the State of Michigan and Great Lakes region. The current Chairman of the Forum is Alexander Masters.

== Notable alumni ==
- Lyn Bankes, American politician
- Dylan Borczak, American soccer player
- Carlos Briggs, American basketball player
- George Chomakov, Bulgarian soccer player
- Sam Hoskin, American basketball player
- Matthew Kapell, American historian
- Mei Lin, American chef and television personality
- Worteh Sampson, Liberian soccer coach
- Laura M. Toy, American politician
- Ernie Zeigler, American basketball coach
- Greg Zuerlein, American figure skater

== See also ==
- Other community colleges in Wayne County
  - Wayne County Community College District (Detroit, Downriver, and eastern Wayne County)
  - Henry Ford College (Dearborn)
