= Michigan's 35th House of Representatives district =

American legislative district

Michigan's 35th State House of Representatives district
Representative
Jennifer Wortz; R–Quincy
- Demographics: 89.3% White; 1.2% Black; 4.8% Hispanic; 0.3% Asian; 0.1% Native American; 0.5% Other; 3.9% Multiracial
- Population (2024): 93,154

Michigan's 35th House of Representatives district is a legislative district within the Michigan House of Representatives located in the counties of Branch, Hillsdale, and Lenawee. The district was created in 1965, when the Michigan Supreme Court ordered the reapportionment of state legislative districts from a county-based system to a proportional one following the Supreme Court case Reynolds v. Sims. It is currently represented by Republican Jennifer Wortz of Quincy.

== List of representatives ==
Representative	Party	Years	Residence	Notes
Marvin R. Stempien	Democratic	1965–1966	Livonia	
Louis E. Schmidt	Republican	1967–1968	Livonia	
Marvin R. Stempien	Democratic	1969–1972	Livonia	
R. Robert Geake	Republican	1973–1977	Northville	Resigned March 1977 after being elected to the Michigan Senate.
Jack E. Kirksey	Republican	1977 (Note: Elected in a 1977 special election to replace Rep. R. Robert Geake, who resigned.)–1984	Livonia	
Lyn R. Bankes	Republican	1985–1992	Livonia	Redistricted to the 19th district.
David M. Gubow	Democratic	1993–1998	Huntington Woods	Redistricted from the 67th district; term limited.
Gilda Z. Jacobs	Democratic	1999–2002	Huntington Woods	
Paul Condino	Democratic	2003–2008	Southfield	Term limited.
Vincent Gregory	Democratic	2009–2010	Southfield	
Rudy Hobbs	Democratic	2011–2014	Lathrup Village	
Jeremy Moss	Democratic	2015–2018	Southfield	
Kyra Harris Bolden	Democratic	2019–2022	Southfield	
Andrew Fink	Republican	2023–2025	Hillsdale	Redistricted from the 58th district.
Jennifer Wortz	Republican	2025–present	Quincy	

== Historical district boundaries ==
Map	Description	Apportionment Plan	Notes
	Wayne County (part): Livonia (part); Northville (part); Northville Township	1964 Apportionment Plan (Note: Referred to as the Austin-Kleiner plan.)	
	Wayne County (part): Livonia (part); Northville (part); Northville Township	1972 Apportionment Plan (Note: Referred to as the Hatcher-Kleiner plan.)	
	Wayne County (part): Livonia (part)	1982 Apportionment Plan	
	Oakland County (part): Berkley; Ferndale; Huntington Woods; Oak Park; Pleasant Ridge; Royal Oak Township	1992 Apportionment Plan	
	Oakland County (part): Lathrup Village; Oak Park (part); Royal Oak Township; Southfield	2001 Apportionment Plan	
	Oakland County (part): Lathrup Village; Southfield; Southfield Township	2011 Apportionment Plan	
	Branch County; Hillsdale County; Lenawee County (part): Hudson (part)	2021 Apportionment Plan (Note: Referred to as the Hickory plan.)	

== Recent elections ==
=== 2020s ===
2026 Michigan House of Representatives election
Party	Candidate	Votes	%
Republican	Jennifer Wortz (incumbent)	25,610	70.89
Democratic	Jeff Cooley	10,514	29.11
Total votes		36,124	100
Republican hold			

2024 Michigan House of Representatives election
Party	Candidate	Votes	%
Republican	Jennifer Wortz	33,647	74.07
Democratic	Don Hicks	11,777	25.93
Total votes		45,424	100
Republican hold			

2022 Michigan House of Representatives election
Party	Candidate	Votes	%
Republican	Andrew Fink	25,210	72.83
Democratic	Andrew Watkins	9,407	27.17
Total votes		34,617	100
Republican gain from Democratic			

2020 Michigan House of Representatives election
Party	Candidate	Votes	%
Democratic	Kyra Harris Bolden (incumbent)	49,096	82.93
Republican	Daniela Davis	9,412	15.9
Libertarian	Tim Yow	693	1.17
Total votes		59,201	100
Democratic hold			

=== 2010s ===
2018 Michigan House of Representatives election
Party	Candidate	Votes	%
Democratic	Kyra Harris Bolden	40,606	85.55
Republican	Theodore Alfonsetti III	6,912	14.55
Total votes		47,518	100
Democratic hold			

2016 Michigan House of Representatives election
Party	Candidate	Votes	%
Democratic	Jeremy Moss (incumbent)	44,737	83.81
Republican	Robert Brim	8,639	16.19
Total votes		53,376	100
Democratic hold			

2014 Michigan House of Representatives election
Party	Candidate	Votes	%
Democratic	Jeremy Moss	31,655	83.02
Republican	Robert Brim	6,473	16.98
Total votes		38,128	100
Democratic hold			

2012 Michigan House of Representatives election
Party	Candidate	Votes	%
Democratic	Rudy Hobbs (incumbent)	43,993	83.03
Republican	Timothy Sulowski	8,989	16.97
Total votes		52,982	100
Democratic hold			

2010 Michigan House of Representatives election
Party	Candidate	Votes	%
Democratic	Rudy Hobbs	28,279	86.7
Republican	Michael Weinenger	3,932	12.06
Green	Franklin Harden	405	1.24
Total votes		32,616	100
Democratic hold			

=== 2000s ===
2008 Michigan House of Representatives election
Party	Candidate	Votes	%
Democratic	Vincent Gregory	41,017	87.56
Republican	Katie Koppin	4,936	10.54
Green	Franklin Harden	894	1.91
Total votes		46,847	100
Democratic hold			

2006 Michigan House of Representatives election
Party	Candidate	Votes	%
Democratic	Paul Condino (incumbent)	31,509	89.14
Republican	Marc Zwick	3,837	10.86
Total votes		35,346	100
Democratic hold			

2004 Michigan House of Representatives election
Party	Candidate	Votes	%
Democratic	Paul Condino (incumbent)	39,799	86.76
Republican	Alan M. Malisow	6,075	13.24
Total votes		45,874	100
Democratic hold			

2002 Michigan House of Representatives election
Party	Candidate	Votes	%
Democratic	Paul Condino	25,876	80.18
Republican	Sylvia Jordan	6,397	19.82
Total votes		32,273	100
Democratic hold			

2000 Michigan House of Representatives election
Party	Candidate	Votes	%
Democratic	Gilda Z. Jacobs (incumbent)	26,756	74.56
Republican	Aaron G. Samson	8,050	22.43
Libertarian	Magalene C. Boleyn	1,077	3
Total votes		35,883	100
Democratic hold			

=== 1990s ===
1998 Michigan House of Representatives election
Party	Candidate	Votes	%
Democratic	Gilda Z. Jacobs	18,672	70.29
Republican	Cecilio Maldonado	6,483	24.4
Libertarian	Pam Collins	839	3.16
Independent	William G. Wizinsky	572	2.15
Total votes		26,566	100
Democratic hold			
