= Lyn Bankes =

American politician

Lyn Bankes (1941) is a former member of the Michigan House of Representatives, representing areas near Livonia, Michigan, and Redford, Michigan, in House District 19 from 1982 to 1998. The district was originally labeled as district 35 until 1993. In 1995, it was noted that she coordinated "a yearly event to recognize business leaders who provide support for their employee's child care needs." The next year, Vote Smart noted that she did not provide voters answers to their National Political Awareness test, a survey on political officials' political views. In 1998, she ended her term in the House due to term limits.

Bankes was born in Detroit in 1941. She attended Schoolcraft Community College before transferring to Madonna University, earning a degree in social sciences in 1982.
