= Edward Patrick McManus =

American politician (1857–1918)

Edward Patrick McManus (20 June 1857 – 8 January 1918) was an American politician.

Both of Edward Patrick McManus's parents immigrated to the United States from Ireland. They married in Keokuk, Iowa, where he was born on 20 June 1857. McManus was educated within local schools and later attended Baylies Commercial College. He subsequently became a schoolteacher, then joined a local company as a bookkeeper. After three years in that position, McManus became a traveling salesperson for the same company. He left the business for marriage, after which he became a farmer for eight years. McManus then worked for his father until the elder McManus died, and subsequently invited George S. Tucker to form a business partnership in stoneworking.

Politically, McManus was affiliated with the Democratic Party. He was elected to the Iowa Senate in 1906 and 1910 for District 1 and served through 1915. In later life, McManus was appointed postmaster of Keokuk, and was serving in this role when he died on 8 January 1918.
