= James Barcia =

American politician (born 1952)

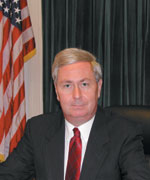

Executive of Bay County
- Incumbent
- Assumed office January 1, 2017
- Preceded by: Thomas L. Hickner

Member of the Michigan Senate from the 31st district
- In office January 3, 2003 – December 31, 2010
- Preceded by: Ken Sikkema
- Succeeded by: Mike Green

Member of the U.S. House of Representatives from Michigan's 5th district
- In office January 3, 1993 – January 3, 2003
- Preceded by: J. Bob Traxler (redistricted)
- Succeeded by: Dale Kildee

Member of the Michigan Senate from the 34th district
- In office January 1, 1983 – December 31, 1992
- Preceded by: Jerome T. Hart
- Succeeded by: Joel Gougeon

Member of the Michigan House of Representatives from the 101st district
- In office January 1, 1977 – December 31, 1982
- Preceded by: Colleen Engler
- Succeeded by: Thomas L. Hickner

Personal details
- Born: James Allan Barcia; February 25, 1952 (age 74) Bay City, Michigan, U.S.
- Party: Democratic
- Spouse: Hattie
- Education: Saginaw Valley State University (BA)

James Allan Barcia (born February 25, 1952) is an American politician serving as the county executive of Bay County, Michigan since 2017. A member of the Democratic Party, Barcia previously served in the Michigan House of Representatives, the Michigan Senate, and the United States House of Representatives.

== Early life and education ==
Barcia was born in Bay City, Michigan, and graduated from Bay City Central High School. He received a B.A. from Saginaw Valley State University in 1974. He was staff assistant to United States Senator Philip A. Hart of Michigan in 1971. Barcia also was a community service coordinator for the Michigan Blood Center, between 1974 and 1975, and he was an administrative assistant to Michigan state representative Donald J. Albosta, from 1975 to 1976.

== Career ==
Barcia was a member of the Michigan State House of Representatives, from 1977 to 1983. He left the House after being elected to the Michigan Senate, where he served until he resigned in 1993 to enter the United States House of Representatives.

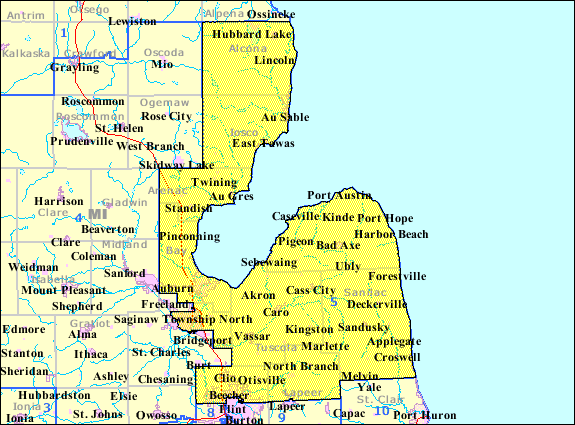
Barcia's Congressional District from 1993 to 2002

Barcia was elected as a Democrat from Michigan's 5th congressional district to the 103rd Congress and to the four succeeding Congresses, serving from January 3, 1993, to January 3, 2003. Like many Michigan Democrats outside of Ann Arbor, Detroit, and Flint, Barcia was more conservative than most Democrats, opposing abortion and gun control, and had a lifetime rating of 54 from the American Conservative Union—the highest of any Democrat from Michigan at the time.

After the United States 2000 Census, Barcia's district was dismantled by the Republican-controlled state legislature. Most of his district's territory was shifted to the 10th District, but his home in Bay City was merged with the neighboring 9th District of fellow Democrat Dale Kildee. The new district retained Barcia's district number (the 5th), but was geographically more Kildee's district. Under the circumstances, Barcia opted to run for his old seat in the State Senate and won.

On October 10, 2002, Jim Barcia was among the 81 House Democrats who voted in favor of authorizing the invasion of Iraq.

With Kildee announcing his retirement July 2011, Barcia considered running for his congressional seat in 2012.

In 2016, Barcia won a heated election to the position of Bay County Executive, after winning the Democratic primary against long-time incumbent Thomas L. Hickner in August. During the campaign, Barcia was accused of hiding campaign funds and using a misleading TV ad.

U.S. House of Representatives
Preceded by Paul B. Henry	Member of the U.S. House of Representatives from Michigan's 5th congressional district 1993–2003	Succeeded by Dale Kildee
U.S. order of precedence (ceremonial)
Preceded by Martha Roby as Former U.S. Representative	Order of precedence of the United States as Former U.S. Representative	Succeeded by Justin Amash as Former U.S. Representative
