= John F. Kelly (Michigan politician) =

Michigan politician

John Kelly

Member of the Michigan Senate from the 1st district
- In office January 1, 1979 – December 31, 1994
- Preceded by: William Fitzgerald
- Succeeded by: Joe Young

Personal details
- Born: John Francis Kelly; September 6, 1949 Detroit, Michigan, U.S.
- Died: September 16, 2018 (aged 69) Detroit, Michigan, U.S.
- Party: Democratic
- Education: University of Michigan, Ann Arbor (BA); Wayne State University (MPA, PhD); Michigan State University (JD); Judge Advocate General's School (LLM); Georgetown University

Military service
- Allegiance: United States
- Branch/service: United States Army
- Years of service: 1978–2009
- Rank: Colonel
- Unit: South Africa Defense Attaché; Judge Advocate General
- Commands: JRU Joint Terrorism Task force

John Francis Kelly (September 6, 1949 – September 16, 2018) was an American politician and academic who served four consecutive terms as a state senator from Michigan. He ran for the U.S. House of Representatives twice and was a candidate for the U.S. Senate in 1994. Kelly taught at the university level for more than 30 years at such venerable institutions as Wayne State University, the University of Detroit, and Oakland University. Among other roles, he was a professor of security studies and a scholar in residence at the National Defense University, and a consultant to the United States Water Partnership established by Secretary of State Hillary Clinton in 2012. He also served as co-chair of the United States Institute of Peace Niger River Task Force, examining water security questions and conflict mitigation. He served as a professor and as the associate dean at the National Defense University's Africa Center for Strategic Studies until he retired in December 2013. He was awarded a Fulbright Scholarship to teach at the University of Windsor in Ontario, Canada, until he joined the Africa Center at NDU. He was a colonel in the U.S. Army Reserves.

== Biography ==
Kelly was born in Detroit to Margaret Elizabeth (née Murphy) and Robert Corby Kelly. Robert was a studio artist and instructor, and retired as an accountant for the Avon Tubing Company. John was one of seven children. His sisters are Maureen, Susan, Margaret and Kathleen, and his brothers are Robert and David, an actor. On September 16, 2018, Kelly died, aged 69, from a heart attack. Married to Toni Marie Plotske they had 2 children, Dana and Rebecca. His wife, Toni and daughter Rebecca predeceased him.

== Education ==
Kelly received a Doctor of Philosophy in Political Science from Wayne State University, where he was a graduate fellow, specializing in international relations and diplomatic history. Kelly also held a Master of Public Administration from Wayne University as well as a Juris Doctor degree from Michigan State University. His baccalaureate degree was in political science and education and was earned with honors at the University of Michigan. Kelly completed further graduate studies at Georgetown University.

== Career ==
=== Political career ===
Kelly was elected to the Michigan State Senate in 1978 from Detroit and served four consecutive four-year terms. At his first caucus Kelly was elected as majority whip and authored over 100 pieces of legislation and amendments that became law, including the state investment anti-apartheid laws for South Africa and the McBride anti-discrimination employment laws for Northern Ireland. He served on committees with jurisdiction over the judiciary, banking and economic development, health policy, local government and public finance. He served on the National Commission on Uniform Law, the Michigan Law Revision Commission and as a delegate to the National Conference on State Legislatures. Kelly served on a National Commission on Distressed States. In 1994 he stood for election to the U.S. Senate requiring retirement from the state legislature.

=== Legal career ===
Kelly passed the Michigan state bar exam served as a special attorney general in Michigan and developed trial experience in the private sector. He practiced law as a principal in several firms as well as in solo practice. He was a member of the bar of the Supreme Court of the United States, the Michigan Supreme Court and all subordinate Federal and State bars as well as the US Court of Military Appeals. He had expertise in the areas of corporate, civil, criminal law as well as immigration and constitutional law, and served in the United States Electoral College in the 2000 election.

=== Military career ===
Kelly retired as a colonel in the U.S. Army Reserves, Civil Affairs branch. As a foreign area officer, he served as a defense attaché on multiple tours of active duty assigned primarily to the Republic of South Africa. In his reserve capacity he spent seven years as a liaison to the Detroit Federal Bureau of Investigation and as a task force officer to a Joint federal law enforcement unit dedicated to counter-terrorism research during the Global War on Terror. A graduate of Army Command and General Staff College, he also spent 10 years as a staff Judge Advocate General. He was decorated repeatedly for his contributions to the defense establishment during times of war.

=== Academic career ===
Kelly came to Dayton, Ohio, as an associate professor from the University of Windsor in Ontario, Canada, where he was a Fulbright Scholar conducting research on comparative federalism. His academic research has focused on retained sovereignty and policy development of sub-national government, and he has received multiple teaching awards. He also served as an elected member of the board of governors of Wayne State University from 1998 to 2002. At the Africa Center for Strategic Studies, Kelly was developing a program to strengthen the rule of law in African governments and promote good governance in the developing world.

=== Film industry involvement ===
Since 2002 Kelly advocated Michigan as a site for the burgeoning digital arts as a cultural medium and created tax incentives for the industry. From 2007, he also served with a dedicated corp of Volunteers as the Director of the Detroit Windsor International Film Festival. The Detroit Windsor International Film Festival began in 2007 and showcased films from across the world as well as local films created and produced in Michigan. The festival was held in the Detroit Cultural Center primarily at Wayne University in Detroit and is affiliated with the University's College of Fine, Performing, and Communication Arts.

Kelly also served from 2002 until 2009 as the elected Vice-Chair of the Michigan Film Advisory Board. The Advisory Board provided tax incentives and managed programs designed to attract film production companies to Michigan as well as promote the growth of Michigan's indigenous film industry.
