= Art Miller Jr. =

American politician (1946–2020)

Member of the Michigan Senate
- In office April 19, 1977 – December 31, 2002
- Preceded by: John Bowman
- Succeeded by: Michael Switalski
- Constituency: 27th district (1977–1994); 10th district (1995–2002)

Personal details
- Born: July 11, 1946 Detroit, Michigan
- Died: June 25, 2020 (aged 73) Royal Oak, Michigan
- Party: Democratic
- Spouse: Marsha
- Children: Derek E. Miller
- Education: Eastern Michigan University

Arthur Miller Jr. (July 11, 1946 – June 25, 2020) was a Democratic member of the Michigan Senate from 1977 through 2002 representing a portion of Macomb County. From April 1985 through 1996, he was the Democratic leader in the chamber.

Miller graduated from Eastern Michigan University with a bachelor's degree in speech and political science. He served three terms on the Warren city council beginning in 1971. In 1977, Miller won election to the Senate in a special election. He won election to a full term in 1978, and served six more terms. He left the Senate in 2003 due to Michigan's term limits.

Miller's father was the first mayor of Warren, and his son, Derek E. Miller, was the Macomb County treasurer and served in the Michigan House of Representatives.

He died of lung cancer on June 25, 2020, in Royal Oak, Michigan at age 73.
