= Mitch Irwin =

American politician

Director of the Michigan Department of Agriculture
- In office August 1, 2005 – July 31, 2007
- Preceded by: Dan Wyant
- Succeeded by: Don Koivisto

Director of the Michigan Department of Management and Budget
- In office January 30, 2003 – July 31, 2005
- Succeeded by: Lisa Webb Sharpe

Member of the Michigan Senate from the 37th district
- In office January 1, 1979 – December 31, 1990
- Preceded by: Robert William Davis
- Succeeded by: George A. McManus, Jr.

Personal details
- Born: July 8, 1952 (age 74) Sault Ste. Marie, Michigan
- Party: Democratic

Mitch Irwin (born July 8, 1952) is a former Democratic member of the Michigan Senate, serving from 1979 through 1990, and was director of two state executive departments under former Governor Jennifer M. Granholm.

Irwin was a member of the Michigan 4-H Board of Trustees and the Michigan Aviation Hall of Fame Board of Trustees.

He was an unsuccessful candidate for the Michigan House of Representatives in 1976, and for Congress in 1988.
