= William A. Sederburg =

American politician

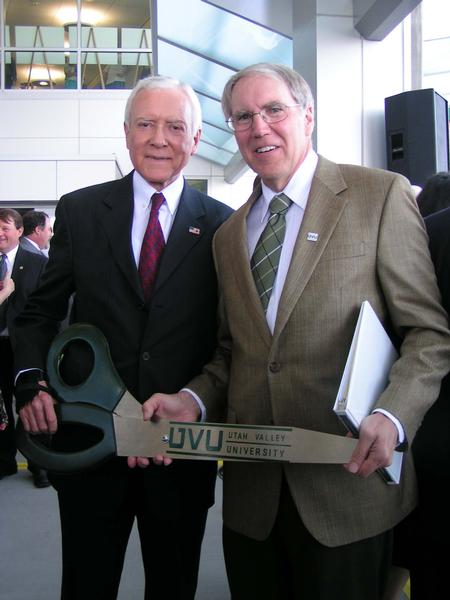
Sederburg (right) and U.S. Senator Orrin Hatch (left) at the ribbon cutting for Utah Valley University library

William A. Sederburg is an American university president and politician. He is a senior scholar at the American Association of State Colleges and Universities. Sederburg was commissioner of the Utah System of Higher Education from 2008 to 2012. He was president of President of Utah Valley State College from 2003 to 2008, overseeing its transformation into Utah Valley University. Sederburg was president of Ferris State University from 1994 to 2003 and served as a member of the Michigan Senate from 1978 to 1991.

Sederburg was born in Nebraska and raised in Minnesota. He has a bachelor's degree from Minnesota State University, Mankato and a master's degree and Ph.D., both from Michigan State University, in political science.

Sederburg and his wife Joyce are the parents of two children.

On June 6, 2014, University of North Carolina President Tom Ross announced that Sederburg will become the interim chancellor of the University of North Carolina Wilmington on August 1, 2014.

== Sources ==
- Crain's Detroit article on Sederburg
- "Commissioner's Office". Utah System of Higher Education. Archived from the original on July 20, 2011.
- Utah HigherEd bio of Sederburg
