= Jack Welborn =

American politician (1932–2021)

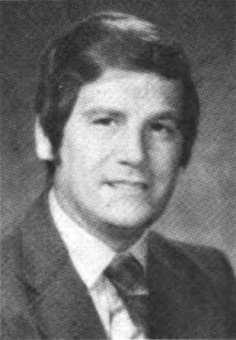

Member of the Michigan Senate from the 13th district
- In office 1985 – December 31, 1994
- Preceded by: Robert A. Welborn
- Succeeded by: Mike Bouchard

Member of the Michigan Senate from the 21st district
- In office 1974 – December 31, 1982
- Preceded by: Anthony Stamm
- Succeeded by: Harmon G. Cropsey

Member of the Michigan House of Representatives from the 47th district
- In office January 1, 1973 – 1974
- Preceded by: Wayne B. Sackett
- Succeeded by: Robert A. Welborn

Personal details
- Born: December 20, 1932 Kalamazoo, Michigan
- Died: March 7, 2021 (aged 88) Kalamazoo, Michigan
- Party: Republican

Jack Welborn (December 20, 1932 – March 7, 2021) was an American politician who served in the Michigan House of Representatives from 1973 to 1974. In 1974, Welborn resigned from the state House to run for a special election in the Michigan Senate caused by the death of Anthony Stamm. He served in the state Senate from 1974 to 1982. In July 1985, Welborn was elected to the state Senate again in another special election following the death of his brother, Senator Robert Welborn. He served from 1985 to 1994.

He died of kidney failure on March 7, 2021, in Kalamazoo, Michigan, at age 88.
