= Joseph Mack (politician) =

American politician (1919–2005)

Joseph S. Mack
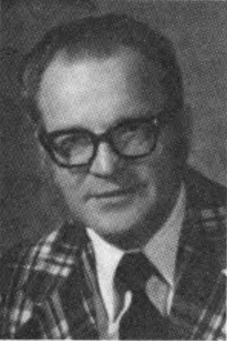

Member of the Michigan Senate from the 38th district
- In office January 1, 1965 – July 24, 1990
- Preceded by: District created
- Succeeded by: Don Koivisto

Member of the Michigan House of Representatives from the Gogebic County district
- In office January 1, 1961 – December 31, 1964
- Preceded by: Louis Mezzano
- Succeeded by: District abolished

Personal details
- Born: May 8, 1919
- Died: April 20, 2005 (aged 85)
- Party: Democratic

Joseph S. Mack (May 8, 1919 – April 20, 2005) was a Democratic member of the Michigan Senate, representing much of the Upper Peninsula from 1965 to 1990.

Born to a mining family, Mack was one of 10 children. After graduating high school, Mack attended the Milwaukee Vocational School and studied steel fabrication. He worked on the Manhattan Project during World War II. Mack returned to Ironwood in 1946 and began his involvement in politics.

Mack was elected to the Michigan House of Representatives in 1960 and served two terms, representing Gogebic County. In 1964, he won election to the Michigan Senate and served 26 years, resigning in 1990 after being charged with fraudulently obtaining travel reimbursement. Despite this, Mack was allowed to retain his pension. While in the Senate, Mack focused his efforts on economic development, outdoor recreation, and natural resources. He chaired the Upper Peninsula Industrial and Economic Affairs Committee and the Conservation Committee, the latter to the chagrin of environmentalists.

He was an unsuccessful candidate for Congress in 1956 and 1958.

Mack died April 20, 2005, aged 85.
