= Michigan's 10th Senate district =

American legislative district

Michigan's 10th State Senate district
Senator
Paul Wojno; D–Warren
- Demographics: 43.7% White; 44.4% Black; 2.4% Hispanic; 5.2% Asian; 0.1% Native American; 0.2% Other; 4% Multiracial
- Population (2024): 273,203

Michigan's 10th Senate district is one of 38 districts in the Michigan Senate. The 10th district was created by the 1850 Michigan Constitution, as the 1835 constitution only permitted a maximum of eight senate districts. It has been represented by Democrat Paul Wojno since 2023, succeeding Republican Michael D. MacDonald.

== Geography ==
District 10 encompasses parts of Macomb and Wayne counties.

=== 2011 Apportionment Plan ===
District 10, as dictated by the 2011 Apportionment Plan, was based in central Macomb County to the north of Detroit, including Sterling Heights, Macomb Township, and most of Clinton Township.

The district was split between Michigan's 9th and 10th congressional districts, and overlapped with the 24th, 25th, 30th, 31st, and 33rd districts of the Michigan House of Representatives.

== List of senators ==
Senator	Party	Dates	Residence	Notes
Fielder S. Snow	Democratic	1853–1854	Clinton	
Perley Bills	Republican	1855–1856	Tecumseh	
Henry M. Boies	Republican	1857–1858	Hudson	
Gideon D. Perry	Republican	1859–1860	Tecumseh	
William Baker Jr.	Republican	1861–1862	Hudson	
Charles Croswell	Republican	1863–1866	Adrian	
Eugene Pringle	Republican	1867–1868	Jackson	
Hiel Woodward	Republican	1869–1870	Brooklyn	
Theodore G. Bennett	Republican	1871–1872	Jackson	
Jonas H. McGowan	Republican	1873–1874	Coldwater	
John H. Jones	Republican	1875–1876	Quincy	
Franklin E. Morgan	Republican	1877–1878	Coldwater	
Edward W. Pendleton	Greenback	1879–1880	Sturgis	
Charles Upson	Republican	1881–1882	Coldwater	
Orlando J. Fast	Republican	1883–1884	Mendon	
Stephen F. Brown	Republican	1885–1886	Schoolcraft	
Charles J. Monroe	Republican	1887–1888	South Haven	
James W. McCormick	Republican	1889–1890	Fennville	
Jan W. Garvelink	Republican	1891–1892	Allegan County	
Myron W. Clark	Democratic	1893–1894	Parma	
John W. Watts	Republican	1895	Jackson	Died in office.
Charles H. Smith	Republican	1895–1896	Jackson	
Andrew Campbell	Republican	1897–1898	Ypsilanti	
Charles A. Ward	Democratic	1899–1900	Ann Arbor	
Hugo C. Loeser	Republican	1901–1902	Jackson	
Frank P. Glazier	Republican	1903–1904	Chelsea	
Archibald J. Peek	Republican	1905–1908	Jackson	
L. Whitney Watkins	Republican	1909–1912	Manchester	
J. Weston Hutchins	Progressive	1913–1914	Hanover	
Charles J. DeLand	Republican	1915–1920	Jackson	
Burney E. Brower	Republican	1921–1926	Jackson	
Jay S. Binning	Republican	1927–1932	Jackson	
W. F. Doyle	Republican	1933–1934	Menominee	
Calvin Jay Town	Republican	1933–1942	North Adams	Died in office.
Haskell L. Nichols	Republican	1943–1964	Jackson	
Roger E. Craig	Democratic	1965–1970	Dearborn	
Patrick H. McCollough	Democratic	1971–1978	Dearborn	
George Z. Hart	Democratic	1979–1982	Dearborn	
Patrick H. McCollough	Democratic	1983–1986	Dearborn	
George Z. Hart	Democratic	1987–1994	Dearborn	
Art Miller Jr.	Democratic	1995–2002	Warren	
Michael Switalski	Democratic	2003–2010	Roseville	
Tory Rocca	Republican	2011–2018	Sterling Heights	
Michael D. MacDonald	Republican	2019–2022	Macomb Township	
Paul Wojno	Democratic	2023–present	Warren	
Natalie Price	Democratic	(Note: Member-elect.)		

== Recent election results ==
=== 2020s ===
2026 Michigan Senate election
Primary election
Party	Candidate	Votes	%
Democratic	Natalie Price	36,567	64.96
Democratic	Amanda Treppa	15,276	27.14
Democratic	Mark Anthony Murphy	4,451	7.91
Total votes		56,294	100
Republican	Michelle Nard	11,424	100
Total votes		11,424	100
General election
Democratic	Natalie Price	97,122	73.16
Republican	Michelle Nard	42,368	26.84
Total votes		110,610	100
Democratic hold			

2022 Michigan Senate election, District 10
Primary election
Party	Candidate	Votes	%
Republican	Paul M. Smith	7,610	63.5
Republican	Joe Hunt	4,379	36.5
Total votes		11,989	100
General election
Democratic	Paul Wojno (incumbent)	60,375	67.7
Republican	Paul M. Smith	28,810	32.3
Total votes		89,185	100
Democratic gain from Republican			

=== 2018 ===
2018 Michigan Senate election, District 10
Primary election
Party	Candidate	Votes	%
Republican	Michael D. MacDonald	15,073	59.5
Republican	Michael Shallal	6,704	26.5
Republican	Joseph Bogdan	3,568	14.1
Total votes		25,345	100
General election
Republican	Michael D. MacDonald	57,353	51.0
Democratic	Henry Yanez	52,277	46.5
Libertarian	Mike Saliba	2,780	2.5
Total votes		112,410	100
Republican hold			

=== 2014 ===
2014 Michigan Senate election, District 10
Primary election
Party	Candidate	Votes	%
Republican	Tory Rocca (incumbent)	13,836	89.7
Republican	Jake Null	1,593	10.3
Total votes		15,429	100
General election
Republican	Tory Rocca (incumbent)	51,465	62.7
Democratic	Kenneth Jenkins	30,657	37.3
Total votes		82,122	100
Republican hold			

=== Federal and statewide results ===
Year	Office	Results
2020	President	Trump 56.0 – 42.8%
2018	Senate	James 50.2 – 48.4%
2018	Governor	Schuette 49.0 – 48.7%
2016	President	Trump 56.0 – 40.0%
2014	Senate	Peters 51.9 – 43.8%
2014	Governor	Snyder 56.6 – 41.5%
2012	President	Romney 50.7 – 48.6%
2012	Senate	Stabenow 57.4 – 39.7%

== Historical district boundaries ==
Map	Description	Apportionment Plan	Notes
	Wayne County (part); Allen Park; Dearborn (part); Lincoln Park; Melvindale; Riverview (part); Southgate; Taylor Township (part)	1964 Apportionment Plan	
	Wayne County (part); Allen Park (part); Dearborn; Detroit (part); Ecorse; Lincoln Park; Melvindale; River Rouge; Wyandotte (part)	1972 Apportionment Plan	
	Wayne County (part); Dearborn; Dearborn Heights; Detroit (part); Inkster; Garden City; Melvindale	1982 Apportionment Plan	
	Macomb County (part); Center Line; East Detroit; Roseville; Warren	1992 Apportionment Plan	
	Macomb County (part); Clinton Township; Roseville; Sterling Heights; Utica	2001 Apportionment Plan	
	Macomb County (part); Clinton Township (part); Macomb Township; Sterling Heights	2011 Apportionment Plan	
