= George Z. Hart =

American politician

Member of the Michigan Senate
- In office January 1, 1987 – December 31, 2002
- Preceded by: Patrick H. McCullough
- Succeeded by: Laura M. Toy
- Constituency: 10th district (1987–1994); 6th district (1995–2002)

Member of the Michigan Senate from the 10th district
- In office January 1, 1979 – December 31, 1982
- Preceded by: Patrick H. McCullough
- Succeeded by: Patrick H. McCullough

Personal details
- Born: George Zaven Hart; May 13, 1924 Detroit, Michigan
- Died: January 31, 2013 (aged 88) Albuquerque, New Mexico
- Party: Democratic
- Spouse: Catherine O'brien Hart

Military service
- Allegiance: United States of America
- Branch/service: United States Army
- Battles/wars: World War II

George Zaven Hart (May 13, 1924 – January 31, 2013) was an American politician.

Born in Detroit, Michigan, Hart served in the United States Army during World War II. He went to Henry Ford Community College and then received his bachelor's degree from Wayne State University. Hart served on the Dearborn, Michigan city council from 1960 to 1970. He then served in the Michigan State Senate, as a Democrat from 1979 to 1982 and from 1987 to 2002. Hart also served on the Wayne County, Michigan Board of Commissioners from 1972 to 1978. He died in Albuquerque, New Mexico.
