= George A. McManus Jr. =

American politician (1930–2024)

Member of the Michigan Senate
- In office January 1, 1991 – December 31, 2002
- Preceded by: Mitch Irwin
- Succeeded by: Tony Stamas
- Constituency: 37th district (1991-1994); 36th district (1995–2002)

Personal details
- Born: December 12, 1930 Old Mission, Michigan, U.S.
- Died: June 21, 2024 (aged 93) Traverse City, Michigan, U.S.
- Party: Republican
- Spouse: Clara (m. 1949)
- Education: Michigan State University

George Alvin McManus Jr. (December 12, 1930 – June 21, 2024) was an American politician who was a Republican member of the Michigan Senate, serving from 1991 to 2002.

== Life and career ==
McManus was born on December 12, 1930 on the Old Mission Peninsula, just north of Traverse City. The salutatorian of St. Francis High School in Traverse City in 1948, McManus went on to receive both a bachelor's and a master's degree from Michigan State University. He later served as the extension director for the institution in Grand Traverse County for 25 years. McManus was also a fourth-generation cherry farmer.

McManus was a trustee of Northwestern Michigan College for 20 years, and a director of the college's foundation. He also served on the Grand Traverse Area Catholic Board of Education.

During his time in the Senate, McManus sponsored the Michigan Groundwater and Freshwater Protection Act and played a key role in protecting family farms from property tax increases.

McManus received an honorary doctorate of agriculture from Michigan State University in May 2003.

McManus died in Traverse City, Michigan on June 21, 2024, at the age of 93.
