= Jerome T. Hart =

American politician

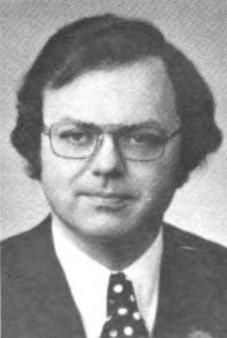

Member of the Michigan Senate
- In office January 1, 1965 – December 31, 1990
- Preceded by: Frank D. Beadle
- Succeeded by: Jon Cisky
- Constituency: 34th district (1965–1982); 14th district (1983–1990)

Personal details
- Born: July 23, 1932 Saginaw, Michigan
- Died: January 20, 1995 (aged 62)
- Resting place: St. Andrew Cemetery, Shields, Michigan
- Party: Democratic

Jerome T. Hart was a Democratic member of the Michigan Senate from 1965 through 1990.

The 4th of 5 children born to Bernard and Florence Hart in Saginaw in 1932, Hart was an unsuccessful candidate for the Michigan House of Representatives in 1958 and an unsuccessful candidate for Congress in 1962 and 1972. He served on the Michigan Democratic State Central Committee from 1959 through 1963 and was an alternate delegate to the 1964 Democratic National Convention. He was also an executive assistant to the state treasurer.

Hart won election to the Michigan Senate in 1964 and served until his defeat by Jon Cisky in 1990. While in the Senate, Hart served on the Appropriations Committee, and chaired the committee from 1975 through 1982. In the 1982 election, redistricting put Hart in the same Senate district—the 14th—as fellow Senator Robert D. Young. Hart won the election in what was one of the most heated Senate races in the state. He suffered a stroke in 1981.

Hart died at home on January 20, 1995 of cardiac arrest aged 62.
