= 1964 Michigan Senate election =

- November 3, 1964

All 38 seats in the Michigan Senate 20 seats needed for a majority
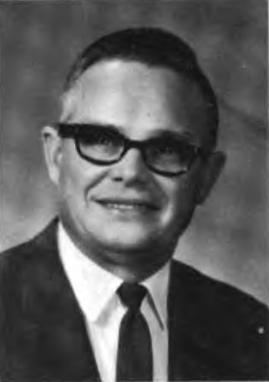

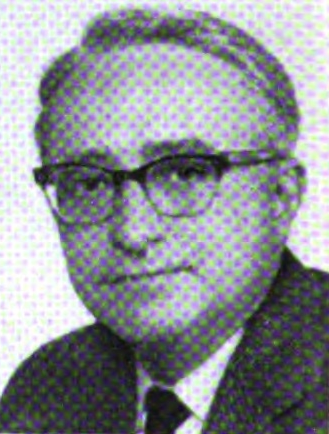
| | Majority party | Minority party |
|---|---|---|
| Leader | Raymond D. Dzendzel | Stanley G. Thayer (retired) |
| Party | Democratic | Republican |
| Leader since | 1963 | 1963 |
| Leader's seat | 18th district | 33rd district |
| Last election | 11 | 23 |
| Seats after | 23 | 15 |
| Seat change | ▲12 | ▼8 |
| Popular vote | 1,743,918 | 1,258,940 |
| Percentage | 58.03% | 41.89% |
Majority Leader before election
Stanley G. Thayer
Republican
Elected Majority Leader
Raymond D. Dzendzel
Democratic

An election was held on November 3, 1964, to elect all 38 members of the Michigan Senate for the 73rd Michigan Legislature. In the election, the Democrats won a 23–15 majority from what had been a Republican majority.

This was the first general election after the adoption of the 1963 Michigan Constitution in January 1964. The previous 1908 state constitution called for 34 state senators and for state senators to serve two-year terms. The new 1963 constitution expanded the state Senate to 38 members, and called for state senators to serve four-year terms. The 1963 constitution stipulated that the 1964 election would only grant two-year terms for state senators, and that four-year terms would begin at the next election in 1966.

== History ==
In the 1962 general election, the Republicans retained control of the chamber with a 23–11 majority over the Democrats.

The 1964 state primary was held on September 1. Of the incumbent state senators, 10 did not seek re-election. Of those, 5 sought other offices and 5 retired. Majority Leader Stanley Thayer unsuccessfully ran for Congress. Of the state senators seeking re-election, 9 were ousted. The Republicans defeated were John P. Smeekens, Frederic Hilbert, Paul C. Younger, Arthur A. Dehmel, Lester O. Begick, Harold Hughes, and Kent T. Lundgren. The Democrats defeated were Philip Rahoi and Charles O. McManiman. This left only 15 incumbents to compete in the general election.

While George Z. Hart the won Democratic primary in the 10th district, he was disqualified in later in September for also seeking renomination to the Dearborn city council in the same election. An attempt to appeal the decision to the Michigan Supreme Court was denied in October. Roger Craig was the runner-up in the primary, and was the one who initially sought the judgement to disqualify Hart. Craig was selected by the Wayne County Democratic committee to replace Hart on the general election ballot.

The general election was held on November 3. The Democrats won a 23–15 majority over the Republicans. Initial partial results made it appear as though Republican incumbent Thomas F. Schweigert lost re-election to Democrat A. M. Schneider, though later results revealed Schweigert had won. The only incumbent who lost re-election was Republican Lloyd A. Stephens. After the election, Democrat Raymond D. Dzendzel was elected majority leader, and Emil Lockwood was selected by Republicans as minority leader.

Republican state senator-elect Paul M. Chandler died on December 12, 1964, before he was able to take office.

The state Senate was sworn in on January 13, 1965.

== Results ==
The following are the official results as printed in the 1965–1966 Michigan Manual. The official results purposefully excluded scattered write-in votes.

=== Statewide ===
| Party | Candi- dates | Votes | | Seats | | |
| Party | Candi- dates | No. | % | No. | +/– | % |
|---|---|---|---|---|---|---|
| Democratic Party | 38 | 1,743,918 | 58.03% | 23 | ▲12 | 60.52% |
| Republican Party | 38 | 1,258,940 | 41.89% | 15 | ▼8 | 39.47% |
| Freedom Now Party | 3 | 2,040 | 0.06% | 0 | Steady | 0.00% |
| Total | 79 | 3,004,898 | 100.00% | 38 | Steady | 100.00% |

=== By district ===
1st District
| Party | Candidate | Votes | % |
|---|---|---|---|
| Democratic | George S. Fitzgerald | 47,884 | 60.80 |
| Republican | Albert J. Thorburn | 30,872 | 39.19 |
| Total votes | | 78,756 | 100.0 |

2nd District
| Party | Candidate | Votes | % |
|---|---|---|---|
| Democratic | Charles N. Youngblood Jr. (incumbent) | 59,615 | 65.68 |
| Republican | Herbert O. Steiger | 31,144 | 34.31 |
| Total votes | | 90,759 | 100.0 |

3rd District
| Party | Candidate | Votes | % |
|---|---|---|---|
| Democratic | Stanley F. Rozycki (incumbent) | 69,258 | 90.07 |
| Republican | Charles A. Grady | 7,236 | 9.41 |
| Freedom Now | Elmer E. Willis | 391 | 0.50 |
| Total votes | | 76,885 | 100.0 |

4th District
| Party | Candidate | Votes | % |
|---|---|---|---|
| Democratic | Coleman A. Young | 50,788 | 87.51 |
| Republican | Edward L. McDermott | 7,246 | 12.48 |
| Total votes | | 58,034 | 100.0 |

5th District
| Party | Candidate | Votes | % |
|---|---|---|---|
| Democratic | Bernard F. O'Brien | 47,918 | 86.55 |
| Republican | William L. Magill | 7,445 | 13.44 |
| Total votes | | 55,363 | 100.0 |

6th District
| Party | Candidate | Votes | % |
|---|---|---|---|
| Democratic | Basil W. Brown (incumbent) | 64,441 | 82.63 |
| Republican | Ross C. Richardson | 12,654 | 16.22 |
| Freedom Now | Raymond E. Willis | 885 | 1.13 |
| Total votes | | 77,980 | 100.0 |

7th District
| Party | Candidate | Votes | % |
|---|---|---|---|
| Democratic | Raymond D. Dzendzel (incumbent) | 62,219 | 67.06 |
| Republican | Billy Shuttleworth | 30,550 | 32.93 |
| Total votes | | 92,769 | 100.0 |

8th District
| Party | Candidate | Votes | % |
|---|---|---|---|
| Democratic | Michael J. O'Brien | 56,384 | 67.89 |
| Republican | Samuel Koch | 26,662 | 32.10 |
| Total votes | | 83,046 | 100.0 |

9th District
| Party | Candidate | Votes | % |
|---|---|---|---|
| Democratic | Stanley Novak (incumbent) | 65,479 | 87.41 |
| Republican | Ellis J. Bonner | 8,667 | 11.56 |
| Freedom Now | Jackie Wilson | 764 | 1.01 |
| Total votes | | 74,910 | 100.0 |

10th District
| Party | Candidate | Votes | % |
|---|---|---|---|
| Democratic | Roger E. Craig | 56,766 | 74.67 |
| Republican | Albert S. Coriaty | 19,255 | 25.32 |
| Total votes | | 76,021 | 100.0 |

11th District
| Party | Candidate | Votes | % |
|---|---|---|---|
| Democratic | John E. McCauley | 48,802 | 66.05 |
| Republican | Edward J. O'Donnell | 25,081 | 33.94 |
| Total votes | | 73,883 | 100.0 |

12th District
| Party | Candidate | Votes | % |
|---|---|---|---|
| Democratic | Edward J. Robinson | 47,285 | 57.49 |
| Republican | Douglas B. Thomas | 34,954 | 42.50 |
| Total votes | | 82,239 | 100.0 |

13th District
| Party | Candidate | Votes | % |
|---|---|---|---|
| Democratic | Terry L. Troutt | 45,867 | 67.59 |
| Republican | Gerald B. Fincke | 21,989 | 32.40 |
| Total votes | | 67,856 | 100.0 |

14th District
| Party | Candidate | Votes | % |
|---|---|---|---|
| Republican | Paul M. Chandler (Note: Paul M. Chandler died in December before he took office. A special election was held in April 1965. It was won by Republican Farrell E. Roberts.) | 46,833 | 52.55 |
| Democratic | James McCarthy | 42,286 | 47.44 |
| Total votes | | 89,119 | 100.0 |

15th District
| Party | Candidate | Votes | % |
|---|---|---|---|
| Democratic | Sander Levin | 51,516 | 61.54 |
| Republican | George W. Kuhn | 32,192 | 38.45 |
| Total votes | | 83,708 | 100.0 |

16th District
| Party | Candidate | Votes | % |
|---|---|---|---|
| Republican | Robert J. Huber | 61,530 | 64.51 |
| Democratic | Donald J. Oberholtzer | 33,846 | 35.48 |
| Total votes | | 95,376 | 100.0 |

17th District
| Party | Candidate | Votes | % |
|---|---|---|---|
| Democratic | Carl W. O'Brien | 38,976 | 53.91 |
| Republican | Lynn D. Allen | 33,319 | 46.08 |
| Total votes | | 72,295 | 100.0 |

18th District
| Party | Candidate | Votes | % |
|---|---|---|---|
| Republican | Gilbert E. Bursley | 40,446 | 53.17 |
| Democratic | William F. Dannemiller | 35,614 | 46.82 |
| Total votes | | 76,060 | 100.0 |

19th District
| Party | Candidate | Votes | % |
|---|---|---|---|
| Republican | Haskell L. Nichols (incumbent) | 38,753 | 52.46 |
| Democratic | Harold L. Archer | 35,113 | 47.53 |
| Total votes | | 73,866 | 100.0 |

20th District
| Party | Candidate | Votes | % |
|---|---|---|---|
| Democratic | Roger Johnson | 38,917 | 51.82 |
| Republican | Edgar B. Lincoln | 36,182 | 48.17 |
| Total votes | | 75,099 | 100.0 |

21st District
| Party | Candidate | Votes | % |
|---|---|---|---|
| Republican | Garry E. Brown (incumbent) | 44,570 | 56.47 |
| Democratic | Neil Vande Vord Jr. | 34,355 | 43.52 |
| Total votes | | 78,925 | 100.0 |

22nd District
| Party | Candidate | Votes | % |
|---|---|---|---|
| Republican | Charles Zollar | 42,767 | 53.74 |
| Democratic | Louis S. Danley | 36,814 | 46.25 |
| Total votes | | 79,581 | 100.0 |

23rd District
| Party | Candidate | Votes | % |
|---|---|---|---|
| Republican | Harold J. Volkema | 51,276 | 60.77 |
| Democratic | Charles C. Wickett | 33,097 | 39.22 |
| Total votes | | 84,373 | 100.0 |

24th District
| Party | Candidate | Votes | % |
|---|---|---|---|
| Republican | S. Don Potter | 47,900 | 57.68 |
| Democratic | George L. Griffiths | 35,135 | 42.31 |
| Total votes | | 83,035 | 100.0 |

25th District
| Party | Candidate | Votes | % |
|---|---|---|---|
| Democratic | Gerald R. Dunn | 45,518 | 54.19 |
| Republican | Gordon Rockwell | 38,472 | 45.80 |
| Total votes | | 83,990 | 100.0 |

26th District
| Party | Candidate | Votes | % |
|---|---|---|---|
| Democratic | John T. Bowman (incumbent) | 55,928 | 73.15 |
| Republican | Donald Brown | 20,520 | 26.84 |
| Total votes | | 76,448 | 100.0 |

27th District
| Party | Candidate | Votes | % |
|---|---|---|---|
| Democratic | William Romano | 62,650 | 69.54 |
| Republican | Homer W. Hazleton | 27,436 | 30.45 |
| Total votes | | 90,086 | 100.0 |

28th District
| Party | Candidate | Votes | % |
|---|---|---|---|
| Republican | Frank D. Beadle (incumbent) | 45,322 | 59.29 |
| Democratic | David J. Wright Jr. | 31,107 | 40.70 |
| Total votes | | 76,429 | 100.0 |

29th District
| Party | Candidate | Votes | % |
|---|---|---|---|
| Democratic | Garland Lane (incumbent) | 48,923 | 65.80 |
| Republican | Loren M. Herfurth | 25,418 | 34.19 |
| Total votes | | 74,341 | 100.0 |

30th District
| Party | Candidate | Votes | % |
|---|---|---|---|
| Republican | Emil Lockwood (incumbent) | 42,340 | 54.49 |
| Democratic | Joseph H. Kurka Jr. | 35,360 | 45.50 |
| Total votes | | 77,700 | 100.0 |

31st District
| Party | Candidate | Votes | % |
|---|---|---|---|
| Republican | Robert VanderLaan (incumbent) | 48,462 | 56.80 |
| Democratic | Richard W. Blake | 36,858 | 43.19 |
| Total votes | | 85,320 | 100.0 |

32nd District
| Party | Candidate | Votes | % |
|---|---|---|---|
| Republican | Milton Zaagman (incumbent) | 42,148 | 52.39 |
| Democratic | John. L. Weeber | 38,300 | 47.60 |
| Total votes | | 80,448 | 100.0 |

33rd District
| Party | Candidate | Votes | % |
|---|---|---|---|
| Democratic | Jan B. Vanderploeg | 43,434 | 54.58 |
| Republican | Lloyd A. Stephens (incumbent) | 36,143 | 45.41 |
| Total votes | | 79,577 | 100.0 |

34th District
| Party | Candidate | Votes | % |
|---|---|---|---|
| Democratic | Jerome T. Hart | 46,239 | 61.21 |
| Republican | R. Dewey Stearns | 29,292 | 38.78 |
| Total votes | | 75,531 | 100.0 |

35th District
| Party | Candidate | Votes | % |
|---|---|---|---|
| Republican | Robert L. Richardson | 43,533 | 53.62 |
| Democratic | John R. Ireland | 37,651 | 46.37 |
| Total votes | | 81,184 | 100.0 |

36th District
| Party | Candidate | Votes | % |
|---|---|---|---|
| Republican | Guy Vander Jagt | 49,651 | 61.54 |
| Democratic | Eugene J. Gershon | 31,019 | 38.45 |
| Total votes | | 80,670 | 100.0 |

37th District
| Party | Candidate | Votes | % |
|---|---|---|---|
| Republican | Thomas F. Schweigert (incumbent) | 40,433 | 51.49 |
| Democratic | A. M. Schneider | 38,080 | 48.50 |
| Total votes | | 78,513 | 100.0 |

38th District
| Party | Candidate | Votes | % |
|---|---|---|---|
| Democratic | Joseph Mack | 54,476 | 64.29 |
| Republican | Frank C. Moody | 30,247 | 35.70 |
| Total votes | | 84,723 | 100.0 |

== See also ==
- 1964 Michigan House of Representatives election
