= 1962 Michigan Senate election =

- November 6, 1962

All 34 seats in the Michigan Senate 18 seats needed for a majority
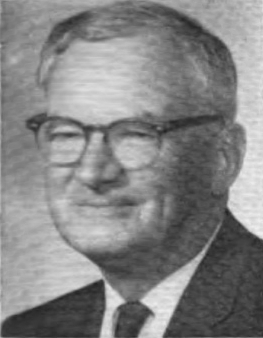

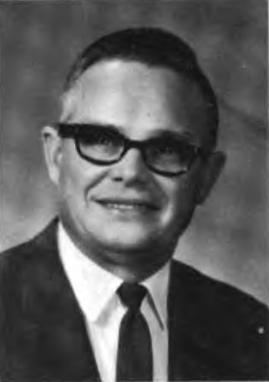
	Majority party	Minority party
Leader	Frank D. Beadle	Raymond D. Dzendzel
Party	Republican	Democratic
Leader since	1957	1962
Leader's seat	34th district	18th district
Last election	22	12
Seats before	23	11
Seats after	23	11
Seat change	0	0
Popular vote	1,282,305	1,346,782
Percentage	48.77%	51.22%
Majority Leader before election
Frank D. Beadle
Republican
Elected Majority Leader
Stanley G. Thayer
Republican

An election was held on November 6, 1962, to elect all 34 members of the Michigan Senate for the 72nd Michigan Legislature. In the election, the Republicans maintained a 23–11 majority over the Democrats in the chamber.

== History ==
In the 1960 general election, the Republicans won a 22–12 majority over the Democrats, maintaining control over the chamber. In January 1962, Democrat William E. Miron died in office. Republican Kent T. Lundgren won the April special election to fill the vacancy. This left the state Senate with a 23–11 Republican majority.

The 1962 state primary was held on August 7. Two incumbent Republicans were defeated. Carlton Morris was defeated by Garry E. Brown and Charles Feenstra was defeated by Robert VanderLaan.

The general election was held on November 6. No incumbents were unseated. The Republicans maintained their 23–11 majority. On December 27, Republican Stanley G. Thayer was elected to serve as state Senate majority leader for the next session, succeeding Frank D. Beadle.

The state Senate was sworn in on January 9, 1963. The same day, Charles S. Blondy was elected minority leader by the Democrats, winning 6 of 11 votes. He succeeded Raymond D. Dzendzel, who'd been serving as acting minority leader since February 1962.

== Results ==
The following are the official results as printed in the 1963–1964 Michigan Manual. The official results purposefully excluded scattered write-in votes.

=== Statewide ===
Party	Candi- dates	Votes		Seats		
Party	Candi- dates	No.	%	No.	+/–	%
Republican Party	34	1,282,305	48.77%	23	Steady	67.64%
Democratic Party	33	1,346,782	51.22%	11	Steady	32.35%
Total	67	2,629,087	100.00%	34	Steady	100.00%

=== By district ===
1st District
Party	Candidate	Votes	%
Democratic	Charles N. Youngblood Jr.	76,424	55.36
Republican	William J. Kennedy	61,617	44.63
Total votes		138,041	100.0
Democratic hold			

2nd District
Party	Candidate	Votes	%
Democratic	Stanley F. Rozycki (incumbent)	81,503	85.02
Republican	Victor S. Wierzbicki	14,359	14.97
Total votes		95,862	100.0
Democratic hold			

3rd District
Party	Candidate	Votes	%
Democratic	Basil W. Brown (incumbent)	60,079	75.85
Republican	Charles A. Grady	19,123	24.14
Total votes		79,202	100.0
Democratic hold			

4th District
Party	Candidate	Votes	%
Democratic	Charles S. Blondy (incumbent)	76,260	87.08
Republican	Harvey T. Bassett	11,312	12.91
Total votes		87,572	100.0
Democratic hold			

5th District
Party	Candidate	Votes	%
Democratic	Stanley Novak (incumbent)	79,972	76.87
Republican	Joseph Bell Jr.	24,056	23.12
Total votes		104,028	100.0
Democratic hold			

6th District
Party	Candidate	Votes	%
Republican	Garry E. Brown	41,175	64.54
Democratic	Richard L. Hord	22,622	35.45
Total votes		63,797	100.0
Republican hold			

7th District
Party	Candidate	Votes	%
Republican	Harry Litowich (incumbent)	35,301	62.55
Democratic	George Westfield	21,129	37.44
Total votes		56,430	100.0
Republican hold			

8th District
Party	Candidate	Votes	%
Republican	Frederic Hilbert (incumbent)	29,847	65.76
Democratic	Edward P. Burns	15,540	34.23
Total votes		45,387	100.0
Republican hold			

9th District
Party	Candidate	Votes	%
Republican	John P. Smeekens (incumbent)	28,468	56.35
Democratic	Stanley L. Brock	22,051	43.64
Total votes		50,519	100.0
Republican hold			

10th District
Party	Candidate	Votes	%
Republican	Haskell L. Nichols (incumbent)	32,720	60.75
Democratic	Gerald H. Wilcox	21,140	39.24
Total votes		53,860	100.0
Republican hold			

11th District
Party	Candidate	Votes	%
Democratic	John T. Bowman	86,568	63.66
Republican	Robert G. Powell	49,398	36.33
Total votes		135,966	100.0
Democratic hold			

12th District
Party	Candidate	Votes	%
Republican	Farrell E. Roberts (incumbent)	141,843	57.27
Democratic	Leland H. Smith	105,806	42.72
Total votes		247,649	100.0
Republican hold			

13th District
Party	Candidate	Votes	%
Democratic	Garland Lane (incumbent)	65,753	54.50
Republican	Edward A. McLogan	54,878	45.49
Total votes		120,631	100.0
Democratic hold			

14th District
Party	Candidate	Votes	%
Republican	Paul C. Younger (incumbent)	50,874	60.29
Democratic	James F. McClure	33,502	39.70
Total votes		84,376	100.0
Republican hold			

15th District
Party	Candidate	Votes	%
Republican	John W. Fitzgerald (incumbent)	29,998	64.32
Democratic	Sidney E. Weseman Jr.	16,640	35.67
Total votes		46,638	100.0
Republican hold			

16th District
Party	Candidate	Votes	%
Republican	Milton Zaagman	29,151	62.96
Democratic	Arthur H. Masterson	17,147	37.03
Total votes		46,298	100.0
Republican hold			

17th District
Party	Candidate	Votes	%
Republican	Robert VanderLaan	47,409	59.87
Democratic	Perry M. Lawr	31,769	40.12
Total votes		79,178	100.0
Republican hold			

18th District
Party	Candidate	Votes	%
Democratic	Raymond D. Dzendzel (incumbent)	103,392	51.76
Republican	Patrick J. McNally	96,330	48.23
Total votes		199,722	100.0
Democratic hold			

19th District
Party	Candidate	Votes	%
Republican	Elmer R. Porter (incumbent)	29,846	55.13
Democratic	William Nichols	24,291	44.86
Total votes		54,137	100.0
Republican hold			

20th District
Party	Candidate	Votes	%
Republican	Arthur A. Dehmel (incumbent)	26,758	100.0
Total votes		26,758	100.0
Republican hold			

21st District
Party	Candidate	Votes	%
Democratic	William D. Ford	135,748	63.51
Republican	Frank P. Domanski	77,988	36.48
Total votes		213,736	100.0
Democratic hold			

22nd District
Party	Candidate	Votes	%
Republican	William J. Leppien	34,334	55.85
Democratic	Anthony P. Beck	27,133	44.14
Total votes		61,467	100.0
Republican hold			

23rd District
Party	Candidate	Votes	%
Republican	Clyde H. Geerlings (incumbent)	50,934	57.88
Democratic	Clifford M. Bartels	37,057	42.11
Total votes		87,991	100.0
Republican hold			

24th District
Party	Candidate	Votes	%
Republican	Lester O. Begick	34,273	55.53
Democratic	Louis W. Doll	27,446	44.46
Total votes		61,719	100.0
Republican hold			

25th District
Party	Candidate	Votes	%
Republican	Emil Lockwood	27,397	65.53
Democratic	William H. Noud	14,411	34.46
Total votes		41,808	100.0
Republican hold			

26th District
Party	Candidate	Votes	%
Republican	Lloyd A. Stephens (incumbent)	19,785	60.62
Democratic	Henry J. Dongvillo	12,850	39.37
Total votes		32,635	100.0
Republican hold			

27th District
Party	Candidate	Votes	%
Republican	William Milliken (incumbent)	23,029	69.09
Democratic	Guy L. McPherson	10,300	30.90
Total votes		33,329	100.0
Republican hold			

28th District
Party	Candidate	Votes	%
Republican	Harold B. Hughes (incumbent)	23,034	66.50
Democratic	Carroll E. Jones	11,600	33.49
Total votes		34,634	100.0
Republican hold			

29th District
Party	Candidate	Votes	%
Republican	Thomas F. Schweigert (incumbent)	21,028	59.49
Democratic	Α. Μ. Schneider	14,318	40.50
Total votes		35,346	100.0
Republican hold			

30th District
Party	Candidate	Votes	%
Republican	Kent T. Lundgren (incumbent)	23,076	53.75
Democratic	LeRoy J. Nelson	19,853	46.24
Total votes		42,929	100.0
Republican hold			

31st District
Party	Candidate	Votes	%
Democratic	Philip Rahoi (incumbent)	24,419	56.12
Republican	Frank C. Moody	19,086	43.87
Total votes		43,505	100.0
Democratic hold			

32nd District
Party	Candidate	Votes	%
Democratic	Charles O. McManiman (Note: A recount was held in the 32nd district in January 1963. The recount affirmed Charles O. McManiman's victory.) (incumbent)	10,721	50.57
Republican	Bert M. Heideman	10,478	49.42
Total votes		21,199	100.0
Democratic hold			

33rd District
Party	Candidate	Votes	%
Republican	Stanley G. Thayer (incumbent)	33,135	61.48
Democratic	Robert J. Niess	20,754	38.51
Total votes		53,889	100.0
Republican hold			

34th District
Party	Candidate	Votes	%
Republican	Frank D. Beadle (incumbent)	30,265	61.95
Democratic	Eldon S. Pringle	18,584	38.04
Total votes		48,849	100.0
Republican hold			
