= 1958 Michigan Senate election =

- November 4, 1958

All 34 seats in the Michigan Senate 18 seats needed for a majority
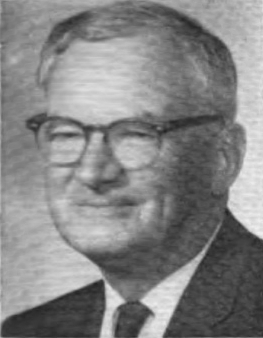

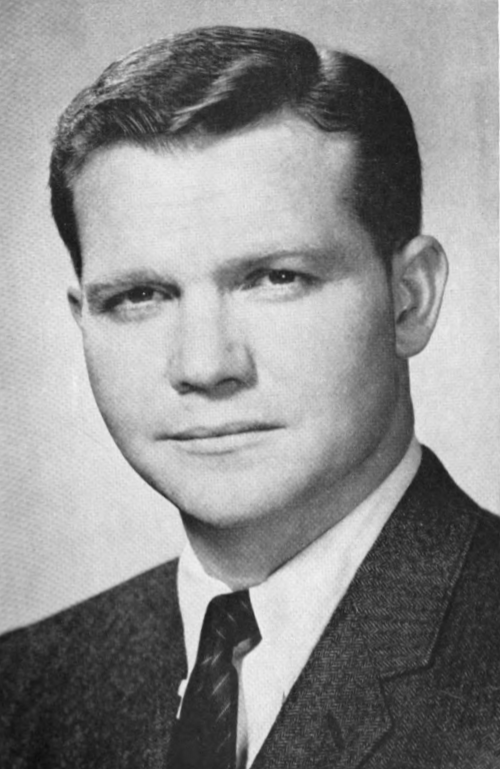
	Majority party	Minority party
Leader	Frank D. Beadle	John Swainson (retired)
Party	Republican	Democratic
Leader since	1957	1957
Leader's seat	34th district	18th district
Last election	23	11
Seats after	22	12
Seat change	▼1	▲1
Popular vote	1,024,724	1,169,875
Percentage	46.64%	53.24%
Majority Leader before election
Frank D. Beadle
Republican
Elected Majority Leader
Frank D. Beadle
Republican

An election was held on November 4, 1958, to elect all 34 members of the Michigan Senate for the 70th Michigan Legislature. In the election, the Republicans lost one seat, kept control with a 22–12 majority over the Democrats.

== History ==
In the 1956 general election, the Republicans maintained a 23–11 majority over the Democrats.

The 1958 state primary was held on August 5.

The general election was held on November 4. The Republicans lost one seat, resulting in a 22–12 majority over the Democrats. Democrat Charles O. McManiman won the open seat left by the retiring Republican Leo H. Roy. Due to a rule change, the state Senate began to elect a majority leader in 1959. Incumbent Republican Caucus Chairman Frank D. Beadle was elected as the first majority leader. Harold M. Ryan was selected by the Democrats as minority leader, succeeding John Swainson, who retired from the state Senate after being elected lieutenant governor.

The state Senate was sworn in on January 14, 1959.

== Results ==
The following are the official results as printed in the 1959–1960 Michigan Manual.

=== Statewide ===
Party	Candi- dates	Votes		Seats		
Party	Candi- dates	No.	%	No.	+/–	%
Republican Party	33	1,024,724	46.64%	22	▼1	64.70%
Democratic Party	34	1,169,875	53.24%	12	▲1	35.29%
Prohibition Party	12	2,429	0.11%	0	Steady	0.00%
Write-ins		16	0.00%	0	Steady	0.00%
Total	79	2,197,044	100.00%	34	Steady	100.00%

=== By district ===
1st District
Party	Candidate	Votes	%
Democratic	Harold M. Ryan (incumbent)	68,699	59.04
Republican	Charles Lasky	47,648	40.95
Total votes		116,347	100.0
Democratic hold			

2nd District
Party	Candidate	Votes	%
Democratic	Stanley F. Rozycki (incumbent)	76,118	85.59
Republican	Frank J. Skierski	12,809	14.40
Total votes		88,927	100.0
Democratic hold			

3rd District
Party	Candidate	Votes	%
Democratic	Basil W. Brown (incumbent)	62,557	78.64
Republican	Charles A. Grady	16,986	21.35
Total votes		79,543	100.0
Democratic hold			

4th District
Party	Candidate	Votes	%
Democratic	Charles S. Blondy (incumbent)	64,835	82.91
Republican	William McKinley Bell	13,358	17.08
Total votes		78,193	100.0
Democratic hold			

5th District
Party	Candidate	Votes	%
Democratic	Stanley Novak (incumbent)	71,943	76.15
Republican	Joseph Bell Jr.	22,532	23.84
Total votes		94,475	100.0
Democratic hold			

6th District
Party	Candidate	Votes	%
Republican	Carlton H. Morris (incumbent)	34,171	63.89
Democratic	Robert B. Locke	19,095	35.70
Prohibition	Ernest W. Jacobs	218	0.40
Total votes		53,484	100.0
Republican hold			

7th District
Party	Candidate	Votes	%
Republican	Harry Litowich	28,551	58.10
Democratic	Merriman C. Williams	20,367	41.44
Prohibition	Loyal S. Dingler	223	0.45
Total votes		49,141	100.0
Republican hold			

8th District
Party	Candidate	Votes	%
Republican	J. Edward Hutchinson (incumbent)	24,995	64.73
Democratic	Elizabeth Ramsey	13,514	34.99
Prohibition	Vernon G. Holmes	104	0.26
Total votes		38,613	100.0
Republican hold			

9th District
Party	Candidate	Votes	%
Republican	John P. Smeekens (incumbent)	24,659	54.65
Democratic	Frank E. Lucas	20,310	45.01
Prohibition	Donald Lawrence	149	0.33
Total votes		45,118	100.0
Republican hold			

10th District
Party	Candidate	Votes	%
Republican	Haskell L. Nichols (incumbent)	29,169	59.86
Democratic	George J. Brannick	19,353	39.72
Prohibition	Leon Lytle	199	0.40
Total votes		48,721	100.0
Republican hold			

11th District
Party	Candidate	Votes	%
Democratic	George C. Steeh (incumbent)	62,191	67.22
Republican	William D. Clyne Jr.	30,319	32.77
Total votes		92,510	100.0
Democratic hold			

12th District
Party	Candidate	Votes	%
Republican	L. Harvey Lodge (incumbent)	97,239	51.12
Democratic	Leo P. Meagher	92,716	48.74
Prohibition	Harry Burr Sr.	255	0.13
Total votes		190,210	100.0
Republican hold			

13th District
Party	Candidate	Votes	%
Democratic	Garland B. Lane (incumbent)	54,924	54.18
Republican	James H. Gardner	46,143	45.52
Prohibition	William H. Morford	296	0.29
Total votes		101,363	100.0
Democratic hold			

14th District
Party	Candidate	Votes	%
Republican	Paul C. Younger (incumbent)	46,113	99.39
Prohibition	Paul H. Kyburz	265	0.57
Write-in		15	0.03
Total votes		46,393	100.0
Republican hold			

15th District
Party	Candidate	Votes	%
Republican	John W. Fitzgerald	25,998	60.71
Democratic	Harold P. Burk	16,689	38.97
Prohibition	Lyle T. Roof	132	0.30
Total votes		42,819	100.0
Republican hold			

16th District
Party	Candidate	Votes	%
Republican	Perry W. Greene (incumbent)	26,484	62.31
Democratic	John L. Weeber	15,953	37.53
Prohibition	LeRoy A. Robart	63	0.14
Total votes		42,500	100.0
Republican hold			

17th District
Party	Candidate	Votes	%
Republican	Charles R. Feenstra (incumbent)	35,095	55.33
Democratic	Edward F. Wiest	28,332	44.66
Total votes		63,427	100.0
Republican hold			

18th District
Party	Candidate	Votes	%
Democratic	Raymond D. Dzendzel	86,563	55.61
Republican	Weldon O. Yeager	69,092	44.38
Total votes		155,655	100.0
Democratic hold			

19th District
Party	Candidate	Votes	%
Republican	Elmer R. Porter (incumbent)	24,900	55.41
Democratic	O. James Hansen	20,031	44.58
Total votes		44,931	100.0
Republican hold			

20th District
Party	Candidate	Votes	%
Republican	Arthur A. Dehmel (incumbent)	24,572	70.93
Democratic	Earl J. Scott	10,066	29.06
Total votes		34,638	100.0
Republican hold			

21st District
Party	Candidate	Votes	%
Democratic	Patrick J. Doyle (incumbent)	107,544	69.03
Republican	Hagbard J. Berg	48,245	30.96
Total votes		155,789	100.0
Democratic hold			

22nd District
Party	Candidate	Votes	%
Republican	Clarence F. Graebner (incumbent)	27,557	53.05
Democratic	Louis C. Schwinger	23,991	46.18
Prohibition	Duncan H. Pyscher	397	0.76
Total votes		51,945	100.0
Republican hold			

23rd District
Party	Candidate	Votes	%
Republican	Clyde H. Geerlings (incumbent)	40,190	53.83
Democratic	Ralph E. Richman	34,460	46.16
Total votes		74,650	100.0
Republican hold			

24th District
Party	Candidate	Votes	%
Republican	Lynn O. Francis (incumbent)	29,217	55.75
Democratic	William J. Kelly	23,190	44.24
Total votes		52,407	100.0
Republican hold			

25th District
Party	Candidate	Votes	%
Republican	John H. Stahlin	24,153	62.57
Democratic	Ralph L. Smith	14,315	37.08
Prohibition	Seth A. Davey	128	0.33
Total votes		38,596	100.0
Republican hold			

26th District
Party	Candidate	Votes	%
Republican	Lloyd A. Stephens (incumbent)	18,089	59.30
Democratic	William Green	12,413	40.69
Total votes		30,502	100.0
Republican hold			

27th District
Party	Candidate	Votes	%
Republican	John Minnema (incumbent)	19,717	63.20
Democratic	John Spoelman	11,475	36.78
Write-in		1	0.00
Total votes		31,193	100.0
Republican hold			

28th District
Party	Candidate	Votes	%
Republican	Charles T. Prescott (incumbent)	19,053	62.86
Democratic	Lawrence J. Raymond	11,255	37.13
Total votes		30,308	100.0
Republican hold			

29th District
Party	Candidate	Votes	%
Republican	Frank Andrews (incumbent)	19,592	60.32
Democratic	Oswald T. McGinn	12,884	39.67
Total votes		32,476	100.0
Republican hold			

30th District
Party	Candidate	Votes	%
Democratic	William E. Miron (incumbent)	21,938	53.40
Republican	Kent T. Lundgren	19,141	46.59
Total votes		41,079	100.0
Democratic hold			

31st District
Party	Candidate	Votes	%
Democratic	Philip Rahoi (incumbent)	26,210	58.12
Republican	Ward Alquist	18,880	41.87
Total votes		45,090	100.0
Democratic hold			

32nd District
Party	Candidate	Votes	%
Democratic	Charles O. McManiman	11,106	51.20
Republican	Bert M. Heideman	10,585	48.79
Total votes		21,691	100.0
Democratic gain from Republican			

33rd District
Party	Candidate	Votes	%
Republican	Lewis G. Christman (incumbent)	23,426	56.18
Democratic	O. Thomas Law Jr.	18,271	43.81
Total votes		41,697	100.0
Republican hold			

34th District
Party	Candidate	Votes	%
Republican	Frank D. Beadle (incumbent)	26,046	61.12
Democratic	Henry O'Dell Williams	16,567	38.87
Total votes		42,613	100.0
Republican hold			
