= 1960 Michigan Senate election =

- November 8, 1960

All 34 seats in the Michigan Senate 18 seats needed for a majority
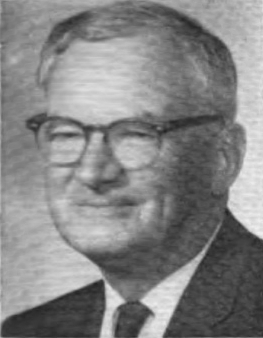

	Majority party	Minority party
Leader	Frank D. Beadle	Harold M. Ryan
Party	Republican	Democratic
Leader since	1957	1959
Leader's seat	34th district	1st district
Last election	22	12
Seats after	22	12
Seat change	0	0
Popular vote	1,657,064	1,523,014
Percentage	52.05%	47.84%
Majority Leader before election
Frank D. Beadle
Republican
Elected Majority Leader
Frank D. Beadle
Republican

An election was held on November 8, 1960, to elect all 34 members of the Michigan Senate for the 71st Michigan Legislature. In the election, the Republicans maintained a 22–11 majority over the Democrats in the chamber.

== History ==
In the 1958 general election, the Republicans won a 22–12 majority over the Democrats, maintaining control of the chamber.

The 1960 state primary was held on August 2. The only incumbent unseated in the primary was Republican John H. Minnema. He was defeated by William Milliken.

The general election was held on November 8. It was initially reported that Republican Kent T. Lundgren defeated incumbent Democrat William E. Miron, though later results showed this to be false. No incumbents were defeated. The Republicans maintained their 22–12 majority. After the election, Republican Frank D. Beadle was re-elected majority leader, and the Democrats re-elected Harold M. Ryan as minority leader.

The state Senate was sworn in on January 11, 1961.

== Results ==
The following are the official results as printed in the 1961–1962 Michigan Manual.

=== Statewide ===
Party	Candi- dates	Votes		Seats		
Party	Candi- dates	No.	%	No.	+/–	%
Republican Party	34	1,657,064	52.05%	22	Steady	64.70%
Democratic Party	34	1,523,014	47.84%	12	Steady	35.29%
Prohibition Party	17	1,868	0.05%	0	Steady	0.00%
Independent American Party	13	1,254	0.03%	0	Steady	0.00%
Tax Cut Party	4	254	0.00%	0	Steady	0.00%
Write-ins		12	0.00%	0	Steady	0.00%
Total	102	3,183,466	100.00%	34	Steady	100.00%

=== By district ===
1st District
Party	Candidate	Votes	%
Democratic	Harold M. Ryan (incumbent)	94,369	57.35
Republican	William J. Kennedy	70,010	42.54
Independent American	Stephen Widera	102	0.06
Prohibition	Dora Furey	60	0.03
Total votes		164,541	100.0
Democratic hold			

2nd District
Party	Candidate	Votes	%
Democratic	Stanley F. Rozycki (incumbent)	101,853	85.04
Republican	Frank J. Skierski	17,802	14.86
Independent American	Joseph Gugala	114	0.09
Total votes		119,769	100.0
Democratic hold			

3rd District
Party	Candidate	Votes	%
Democratic	Basil W. Brown (incumbent)	78,556	75.89
Republican	William Friendly Hands	24,808	23.96
Independent American	William P. Dunn	148	0.14
Total votes		103,512	100.0
Democratic hold			

4th District
Party	Candidate	Votes	%
Democratic	Charles S. Blondy (incumbent)	92,658	83.15
Republican	Harvey T. Bassett	18,688	16.77
Independent American	Keith Y. Knapp	86	0.07
Total votes		111,432	100.0
Democratic hold			

5th District
Party	Candidate	Votes	%
Democratic	Stanley Novak (incumbent)	97,727	74.96
Republican	Joseph Bell Jr.	32,468	24.90
Independent American	William A. Carey	108	0.08
Prohibition	Bertha Kidd	57	0.04
Total votes		130,360	100.0
Democratic hold			

6th District
Party	Candidate	Votes	%
Republican	Carlton H. Morris (incumbent)	51,384	62.65
Democratic	Richard L. Hord	30,397	37.06
Prohibition	Gerald A. Saterbak	222	0.27
Write-in		4	0.00
Total votes		82,007	100.0
Republican hold			

7th District
Party	Candidate	Votes	%
Republican	Harry Litowich (incumbent)	44,308	60.28
Democratic	Tom Slattery	29,043	39.51
Prohibition	Loyal S. Dingler	145	0.19
Write-in		1	0.00
Total votes		73,497	100.0
Republican hold			

8th District
Party	Candidate	Votes	%
Republican	Frederic Hilbert	36,616	66.92
Democratic	Otto J. Roller	17,940	32.78
Prohibition	Vernon G. Holmes	103	0.18
Tax Cut	Cletus Heibel	53	0.09
Total votes		54,712	100.0
Republican hold			

9th District
Party	Candidate	Votes	%
Republican	John P. Smeekens (incumbent)	35,547	52.63
Democratic	Raymond M. Turner	31,818	47.11
Prohibition	Donald Lawrence	164	0.24
Total votes		67,529	100.0
Republican hold			

10th District
Party	Candidate	Votes	%
Republican	Haskell L. Nichols (incumbent)	41,786	61.41
Democratic	Herbert C. Fowle	26,123	38.39
Prohibition	Clarence DeCan	124	0.18
Write-in		2	0.00
Total votes		68,035	100.0
Republican hold			

11th District
Party	Candidate	Votes	%
Democratic	George C. Steeh (incumbent)	104,474	64.93
Republican	Homer Hazelton	56,324	35.00
Independent American	Frank J. Knapp	104	0.06
Total votes		160,902	100.0
Democratic hold			

12th District
Party	Candidate	Votes	%
Republican	Farrell E. Roberts	156,295	54.09
Democratic	S. Jerome Bronson	132,361	45.80
Independent American	William K. Paul	147	0.05
Prohibition	Archie E. Allen	132	0.04
Total votes		288,935	100.0
Republican hold			

13th District
Party	Candidate	Votes	%
Democratic	Garland Lane (incumbent)	73,117	51.13
Republican	Paul V. Gadola Jr.	69,665	48.72
Prohibition	William H. Morford	196	0.13
Total votes		142,978	100.0
Democratic hold			

14th District
Party	Candidate	Votes	%
Republican	Paul C. Younger (incumbent)	60,653	60.41
Democratic	Bruce S. King	39,708	39.54
Independent American	Lee W. Johnson	41	0.04
Total votes		100,402	100.0
Republican hold			

15th District
Party	Candidate	Votes	%
Republican	John W. Fitzgerald (incumbent)	36,825	65.30
Democratic	Kenneth S. Bailey Sr.	19,479	34.54
Prohibition	Lyle T. Roof	85	0.15
Total votes		56,389	100.0
Republican hold			

16th District
Party	Candidate	Votes	%
Republican	Perry W. Greene (incumbent)	36,411	62.18
Democratic	John L. Weeber Sr.	22,071	37.69
Prohibition	Rolland Ball	43	0.07
Tax Cut	Tom Gaertner	24	0.04
Total votes		58,549	100.0
Republican hold			

17th District
Party	Candidate	Votes	%
Republican	Charles R. Feenstra (incumbent)	54,584	57.83
Democratic	William F. McCormack	39,713	42.07
Prohibition	Martin L. Pulsifer Jr.	81	0.08
Total votes		94,378	100.0
Republican hold			

18th District
Party	Candidate	Votes	%
Democratic	Raymond D. Dzendzel (incumbent)	123,609	53.74
Republican	Weldon O. Yeager	106,055	46.11
Independent American	William J. Barlow	148	0.06
Tax Cut	John H. Grass	101	0.04
Prohibition	Lyle Eckert	76	0.03
Total votes		229,989	100.0
Democratic hold			

19th District
Party	Candidate	Votes	%
Republican	Elmer R. Porter (incumbent)	36,881	55.16
Democratic	O. James Hansen	29,929	44.76
Independent American	Philip W. Marvin	40	0.05
Write-in		1	0.00
Total votes		66,851	100.0
Republican hold			

20th District
Party	Candidate	Votes	%
Republican	Arthur A. Dehmel (incumbent)	31,682	69.50
Democratic	Richard Erla	13,895	30.48
Independent American	Earl W. Walker	8	0.01
Total votes		45,585	100.0
Republican hold			

21st District
Party	Candidate	Votes	%
Democratic	Patrick J. Doyle (incumbent)	161,929	63.08
Republican	Douglas L. Brown	94,474	36.80
Independent American	Daniel Wadowski	179	0.06
Prohibition	Arlon Hendershot	114	0.04
Total votes		256,696	100.0
Democratic hold			

22nd District
Party	Candidate	Votes	%
Republican	Clarence F. Graebner (incumbent)	39,859	54.87
Democratic	Louis C. Schwinger	32,657	44.96
Prohibition	James H. Kavanagh	116	0.15
Total votes		72,632	100.0
Republican hold			

23rd District
Party	Candidate	Votes	%
Republican	Clyde H. Geerlings (incumbent)	60,878	59.41
Democratic	Ralph E. Richman	41,586	40.58
Total votes		102,464	100.0
Republican hold			

24th District
Party	Candidate	Votes	%
Republican	Lynn O. Francis (incumbent)	40,942	55.14
Democratic	Clifford V. Mapes	33,305	44.85
Total votes		74,247	100.0
Republican hold			

25th District
Party	Candidate	Votes	%
Republican	John H. Stahlin (incumbent)	33,208	65.89
Democratic	Ralph L. Smith	17,091	33.91
Prohibition	Lewis H. Horn	99	0.19
Total votes		50,398	100.0
Republican hold			

26th District
Party	Candidate	Votes	%
Republican	Lloyd A. Stephens (incumbent)	23,099	61.34
Democratic	William A. Green	14,555	38.65
Total votes		37,654	100.0
Republican hold			

27th District
Party	Candidate	Votes	%
Republican	William Milliken	26,176	68.09
Democratic	John B. Hopkins	12,267	31.90
Total votes		38,443	100.0
Republican hold			

28th District
Party	Candidate	Votes	%
Republican	Charles T. Prescott (incumbent)	26,578	66.14
Democratic	Martin Blumenthal	13,550	33.72
Prohibition	Harold B. Stange	51	0.12
Total votes		40,179	100.0
Republican hold			

29th District
Party	Candidate	Votes	%
Republican	Thomas F. Schweigert	24,245	59.11
Democratic	A. M. Schneider	16,767	40.87
Write-in		4	0.00
Total votes		41,016	100.0
Republican hold			

30th District
Party	Candidate	Votes	%
Democratic	William E. Miron (Note: A recount was held in the 30th district in January 1961. The recount affirmed William E. Miron's victory.) (incumbent)	25,220	50.06
Republican	Kent T. Lundgren	25,151	49.93
Total votes		50,371	100.0
Democratic hold			

31st District
Party	Candidate	Votes	%
Democratic	Philip Rahoi (incumbent)	29,627	55.98
Republican	Joseph P. Cloon	23,213	43.86
Tax Cut	Matt Annala	76	0.14
Total votes		52,916	100.0
Democratic hold			

32nd District
Party	Candidate	Votes	%
Democratic	Charles O. McManiman (incumbent)	12,840	51.02
Republican	Leo H. Roy	12,326	48.97
Total votes		25,166	100.0
Democratic hold			

33rd District
Party	Candidate	Votes	%
Republican	Stanley G. Thayer	37,639	59.96
Democratic	Richard L. Cutler	25,133	40.03
Total votes		62,772	100.0
Republican hold			

34th District
Party	Candidate	Votes	%
Republican	Frank D. Beadle (incumbent)	36,434	62.64
Democratic	Eldon S. Pringle	21,697	37.30
Independent American	Melvin C. Walton	29	0.04
Total votes		58,160	100.0
Republican hold			
