= 1956 Michigan Senate election =

- November 6, 1956

All 34 seats in the Michigan Senate 18 seats needed for a majority

	Majority party	Minority party
Leader	Creighton R. Coleman	Harold M. Ryan
Party	Republican	Democratic
Leader since	1953	1955
Leader's seat	9th district	1st district
Last election	23	11
Seats after	23	11
Seat change	0	0
Popular vote	1,485,036	1,475,445
Percentage	50.12%	49.80%
Majority Leader before election
Creighton R. Coleman
Republican
Elected Majority Leader
Frank D. Beadle
Republican

An election was held on November 6, 1956, to elect all 34 members of the Michigan Senate for the 69th Michigan Legislature. In the election, the Republicans maintained a 23–11 majority over the Democrats.

== History ==
In the 1954 general election, the Republicans maintained their control of the state Senate with a 23–11 majority over the Democrats.

The state primary was held on August 7. Republican incumbent Don Vander Werp was defeated by Lloyd A. Stephens. Democratic incumbent Edward H. Gibbs was defeated by William E. Miron.

The general election was held on November 6. The Republicans maintained their 23–11 majority over the Democrats. Following the election, Frank D. Beadle was elected Republican caucus chairman, replacing Creighton R. Coleman, who was defeated in the primary when he ran to serve in the United States House of Representatives. John Swainson was chosen by the Democrats as minority leader, succeeding Harold M. Ryan.

The state Senate was sworn in on January 9, 1957.

== Results ==
The following are the official results as printed in the 1957–1958 Michigan Manual.

=== Statewide ===
Party	Candi- dates	Votes		Seats		
Party	Candi- dates	No.	%	No.	+/–	%
Republican Party	34	1,485,036	50.12%	23	Steady	67.64%
Democratic Party	34	1,475,445	49.80%	12	Steady	35.29%
Prohibition Party	7	2,173	0.07%	0	Steady	0.00%
Write-ins		10	0.00%	0	Steady	0.00%
Total	75	2,962,664	100.00%	34	Steady	100.00%

=== By district ===
1st District
Party	Candidate	Votes	%
Democratic	Harold M. Ryan (incumbent)	87,306	53.29
Republican	Leroy Smith	76,496	46.70
Total votes		163,802	100.0
Democratic hold			

2nd District
Party	Candidate	Votes	%
Democratic	Stanley F. Rozycki (incumbent)	102,519	80.65
Republican	Victor S. Wierzbicki	24,582	19.34
Total votes		127,101	100.0
Democratic hold			

3rd District
Party	Candidate	Votes	%
Democratic	Basil W. Brown	91,407	74.59
Republican	George W. Tobias	31,126	25.40
Total votes		122,533	100.0
Democratic hold			

4th District
Party	Candidate	Votes	%
Democratic	Charles S. Blondy (incumbent)	96,972	77.40
Republican	Julian P. Rodgers Jr.	28,304	22.59
Total votes		125,276	100.0
Democratic hold			

5th District
Party	Candidate	Votes	%
Democratic	Stanley Novak (incumbent)	94,530	69.72
Republican	Albert A. Williams	41,049	30.27
Total votes		135,579	100.0
Democratic hold			

6th District
Party	Candidate	Votes	%
Republican	Carlton H. Morris (incumbent)	51,062	67.63
Democratic	Benjamin V. Unwin	24,436	32.36
Write-in		2	0.00
Total votes		75,500	100.0
Republican hold			

7th District
Party	Candidate	Votes	%
Republican	Robert E. Faulkner (incumbent)	40,784	62.50
Democratic	Merriman C. Williams	24,467	37.49
Total votes		65,251	100.0
Republican hold			

8th District
Party	Candidate	Votes	%
Republican	J. Edward Hutchinson (incumbent)	36,490	68.91
Democratic	Major W. Seery	16,457	31.08
Total votes		52,947	100.0
Republican hold			

9th District
Party	Candidate	Votes	%
Republican	John P. Smeekens	36,839	57.72
Democratic	Frank E. Lucas	26,977	42.27
Write-in		1	0.00
Total votes		63,817	100.0
Republican hold			

10th District
Party	Candidate	Votes	%
Republican	Haskell L. Nichols (incumbent)	41,662	65.40
Democratic	Willard F. Rappleye	21,735	34.11
Prohibition	Gerald Leslie Myers	306	0.48
Total votes		63,703	100.0
Republican hold			

11th District
Party	Candidate	Votes	%
Democratic	George C. Steeh	69,502	59.53
Republican	Homer W. Hazelton	46,858	40.13
Prohibition	Clarence E. Smith	391	0.33
Total votes		116,751	100.0
Democratic hold			

12th District
Party	Candidate	Votes	%
Republican	L. Harvey Lodge	138,449	55.97
Democratic	Fred Elias	108,894	44.02
Total votes		247,343	100.0
Republican hold			

13th District
Party	Candidate	Votes	%
Democratic	Garland B. Lane (incumbent)	70,025	52.46
Republican	Robert Beach	63,098	47.27
Prohibition	George B. Kenworthy	348	0.26
Total votes		133,471	100.0
Democratic hold			

14th District
Party	Candidate	Votes	%
Republican	Harry F. Hittle (incumbent)	58,398	62.06
Democratic	Stuart J. Dunnings Jr.	35,697	37.93
Write-in		1	0.00
Total votes		94,096	100.0
Republican hold			

15th District
Party	Candidate	Votes	%
Republican	Donald E. Smith (incumbent)	34,877	65.00
Democratic	Karl R. Weiler	18,778	34.99
Write-in		1	0.00
Total votes		53,656	100.0
Republican hold			

16th District
Party	Candidate	Votes	%
Republican	Perry W. Greene (incumbent)	37,846	64.19
Democratic	Joseph L. Hansknecht Jr.	20,849	35.36
Prohibition	Dorr Coxon	260	0.44
Total votes		58,955	100.0
Republican hold			

17th District
Party	Candidate	Votes	%
Republican	Charles R. Feenstra (incumbent)	47,826	58.31
Democratic	Edward F. Wiest	34,190	41.68
Total votes		82,016	100.0
Republican hold			

18th District
Party	Candidate	Votes	%
Democratic	John Swainson	106,588	51.13
Republican	George F. Boos	101,853	48.86
Total votes		208,441	100.0
Democratic hold			

19th District
Party	Candidate	Votes	%
Republican	Elmer R. Porter (incumbent)	36,926	60.99
Democratic	Grenval W. Spangler	23,613	39.00
Total votes		60,539	100.0
Republican hold			

20th District
Party	Candidate	Votes	%
Republican	Arthur A. Dehmel (incumbent)	31,065	74.35
Democratic	Jacob Gleeson	10,716	25.64
Total votes		41,781	100.0
Republican hold			

21st District
Party	Candidate	Votes	%
Democratic	Patrick J. Doyle (incumbent)	126,711	60.84
Republican	John T. McWilliams	80,982	38.88
Prohibition	Estelle Tripp	554	0.26
Total votes		208,247	100.0
Democratic hold			

22nd District
Party	Candidate	Votes	%
Republican	Clarence F. Graebner (incumbent)	39,555	58.34
Democratic	Leo M. Kenny	28,245	41.65
Total votes		67,800	100.0
Republican hold			

23rd District
Party	Candidate	Votes	%
Republican	Clyde H. Geerlings (incumbent)	53,191	57.22
Democratic	Jan B. Vanderploeg	39,762	42.77
Total votes		92,953	100.0
Republican hold			

24th District
Party	Candidate	Votes	%
Republican	Lynn O. Francis (incumbent)	40,147	60.49
Democratic	Frank G. Davis Jr.	26,001	39.17
Prohibition	Mildred Montgomery	220	0.33
Write-in		1	0.00
Total votes		66,369	100.0
Republican hold			

25th District
Party	Candidate	Votes	%
Republican	Bert J. Storey (incumbent)	33,043	67.78
Democratic	Owen C. Mumaw	15,706	32.21
Total votes		48,749	100.0
Republican hold			

26th District
Party	Candidate	Votes	%
Republican	Lloyd A. Stephens	23,071	64.81
Democratic	G. Searle Barnett	12,426	34.91
Prohibition	Edward A. Pearce	94	0.26
Write-in		2	0.00
Total votes		35,593	100.0
Republican hold			

27th District
Party	Candidate	Votes	%
Republican	John Minnema (incumbent)	24,656	66.97
Democratic	William Hettiger	12,160	33.02
Total votes		36,816	100.0
Republican hold			

28th District
Party	Candidate	Votes	%
Republican	Charles T. Prescott (incumbent)	26,007	70.56
Democratic	Clayton Dishong	10,847	29.43
Write-in		2	0.00
Total votes		36,856	100.0
Republican hold			

29th District
Party	Candidate	Votes	%
Republican	Frank Andrews (incumbent)	24,254	64.75
Democratic	James W. McKay	13,201	35.24
Total votes		37,455	100.0
Republican hold			

30th District
Party	Candidate	Votes	%
Democratic	William E. Miron (Note: A recount was held in the 30th district in January 1957. The recount affirmed William E. Miron's victory.)	24,681	50.10
Republican	Kent T. Lundgren	24,578	49.89
Total votes		49,259	100.0
Democratic hold			

31st District
Party	Candidate	Votes	%
Democratic	Philip Rahoi (incumbent)	28,222	52.71
Republican	Carl G. Lindquist	25,317	47.28
Total votes		53,539	100.0
Democratic hold			

32nd District
Party	Candidate	Votes	%
Republican	Leo H. Roy (incumbent)	14,653	56.36
Democratic	Charles O. McManiman	11,343	43.63
Total votes		25,996	100.0
Republican hold			

33rd District
Party	Candidate	Votes	%
Republican	Lewis G. Christman (incumbent)	34,251	60.39
Democratic	Arthur E. Carpenter	22,464	39.60
Total votes		56,715	100.0
Republican hold			

34th District
Party	Candidate	Votes	%
Republican	Frank D. Beadle (incumbent)	35,741	66.48
Democratic	Henry O'Dell Williams	18,018	33.51
Total votes		53,759	100.0
Republican hold			
