= 1966 Michigan Senate election =

- November 8, 1966

All 38 seats in the Michigan Senate 20 seats needed for a majority
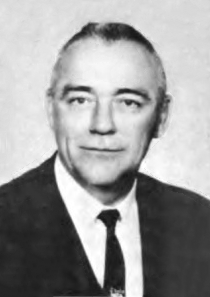

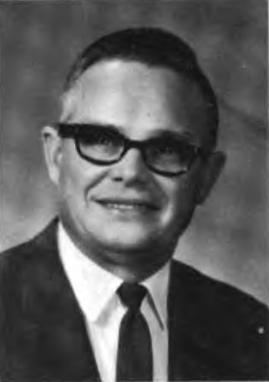
	Majority party	Minority party
Leader	Emil Lockwood	Raymond D. Dzendzel
Party	Republican	Democratic
Leader since	1965	1963
Leader's seat	30th district	7th district
Last election	15	23
Seats after	20	18
Seat change	▲5	▼5
Popular vote	1,183,523	1,122,624
Percentage	51.32%	48.67%
Majority Leader before election
Raymond D. Dzendzel
Democratic
Elected Majority Leader
Emil Lockwood
Republican

An election was held on November 8, 1966, to elect all 38 members of the Michigan Senate for the 74th Michigan Legislature. In the election, the Republicans won a 20–18 majority from what had been a Democratic majority.

The 1963 Michigan Constitution came into effect January 1964. As per the new constitution, the term length for state senators was increased from two years to four years. However, as stipulated by the state constitution, this expanded term length wasn't to take effect until 1966. This made the 1966 election the first to elect state senators for four-year terms in Michigan.

== History ==
In the 1964 general election, the Democrats won a 23–15 majority from what had been a Republican majority.

The 1966 state primary election was held on August 2. Four incumbents lost re-election, two Republicans and two Democrats. Dean of the state Senate, Republican Haskell L. Nichols was defeated by James D. Gray. Republican Don Potter was defeated by Harold W. Hungerford. Democrats Terry L. Troutt and Bernard F. O'Brien were defeated by William Faust and Arthur Cartwright, respectively.

The general election was held on November 8. Republicans won a 20–18 majority over the Democrats. Republicans ousted five Democratic incumbents: Edward J. Robinson, Carl W. O'Brien, Jan Vanderploeg, Roger Johnson, and Gerald R. Dunn. Following the election, the two parties re-elected their incumbent leaders. Emil Lockwood, who initially planned to retire as leader, was re-elected Republican leader to serve as majority leader. Raymond D. Dzendzel was re-elected Democratic leader to serve as minority leader.

The state Senate was sworn in on January 11, 1967.

== Results ==
The following are the official results as printed in the 1967–1968 Michigan Manual. The official results purposefully excluded scattered write-in votes.

=== Statewide ===
Party	Candi- dates	Votes		Seats		
Party	Candi- dates	No.	%	No.	+/–	%
Republican Party	38	1,183,523	51.32%	20	▲5	52.63%
Democratic Party	38	1,122,624	48.67%	18	▼5	47.36%
Total	76	2,306,147	100.00%	38	Steady	100.00%

=== By district ===
1st District
Party	Candidate	Votes	%
Democratic	George S. Fitzgerald (incumbent)	28,221	51.77
Republican	George Bashara	26,285	48.22
Total votes		54,506	100.0
Democratic hold			

2nd District
Party	Candidate	Votes	%
Democratic	Charles N. Youngblood Jr. (incumbent)	37,035	55.99
Republican	Peter E. O'Rourke	29,102	44.00
Total votes		66,137	100.0
Democratic hold			

3rd District
Party	Candidate	Votes	%
Democratic	Stanley F. Rozycki (incumbent)	42,399	84.77
Republican	James F. Nowicki	7,616	15.22
Total votes		50,015	100.0
Democratic hold			

4th District
Party	Candidate	Votes	%
Democratic	Coleman A. Young (incumbent)	28,985	83.88
Republican	Samuel F. Winfield	5,570	16.11
Total votes		34,555	100.0
Democratic hold			

5th District
Party	Candidate	Votes	%
Democratic	Arthur Cartwright	25,735	78.58
Republican	Arthur Kurtz	7,015	21.41
Total votes		32,750	100.0
Democratic hold			

6th District
Party	Candidate	Votes	%
Democratic	Basil W. Brown (incumbent)	36,327	76.09
Republican	Mary L. Dyell	11,414	23.90
Total votes		47,741	100.0
Democratic hold			

7th District
Party	Candidate	Votes	%
Democratic	Raymond D. Dzendzel (incumbent)	38,723	60.31
Republican	Billy Shuttleworth	25,481	39.68
Total votes		64,204	100.0
Democratic hold			

8th District
Party	Candidate	Votes	%
Democratic	Michael J. O'Brien (incumbent)	33,869	61.11
Republican	George William Finegan	21,549	38.88
Total votes		55,418	100.0
Democratic hold			

9th District
Party	Candidate	Votes	%
Democratic	Stanley Novak (incumbent)	38,624	83.94
Republican	Sidney S. Kelly	7,386	16.05
Total votes		46,010	100.0
Democratic hold			

10th District
Party	Candidate	Votes	%
Democratic	Roger E. Craig (incumbent)	37,469	65.72
Republican	Joseph F. Nagy	19,540	34.27
Total votes		57,009	100.0
Democratic hold			

11th District
Party	Candidate	Votes	%
Democratic	John E. McCauley (incumbent)	32,588	57.05
Republican	T. Edward Dunlop	24,531	42.94
Total votes		57,119	100.0
Democratic hold			

12th District
Party	Candidate	Votes	%
Republican	N. Lorraine Beebe	33,634	50.68
Democratic	Edward J. Robinson (incumbent)	32,726	49.31
Total votes		66,360	100.0
Republican gain from Democratic			

13th District
Party	Candidate	Votes	%
Democratic	William Faust	31,540	64.96
Republican	Patrick James Ronan Sr.	17,007	35.03
Total votes		48,547	100.0
Democratic hold			

14th District
Party	Candidate	Votes	%
Republican	George W. Kuhn	47,830	63.96
Democratic	Paul F. Livingston	26,940	36.03
Total votes		74,770	100.0
Republican hold			

15th District
Party	Candidate	Votes	%
Democratic	Sander Levin (incumbent)	39,587	59.27
Republican	Tom Rowley	27,199	40.72
Total votes		66,786	100.0
Democratic hold			

16th District
Party	Candidate	Votes	%
Republican	Robert J. Huber (incumbent)	59,915	73.91
Democratic	Edward A. Kavanagh	21,147	26.08
Total votes		81,062	100.0
Republican hold			

17th District
Party	Candidate	Votes	%
Republican	L. Harvey Lodge	30,007	53.30
Democratic	Carl W. O'Brien (incumbent)	26,286	46.69
Total votes		56,293	100.0
Republican gain from Democratic			

18th District
Party	Candidate	Votes	%
Republican	Gilbert E. Bursley (incumbent)	40,495	63.86
Democratic	George Wahr Sallade	22,908	36.13
Total votes		63,403	100.0
Republican hold			

19th District
Party	Candidate	Votes	%
Republican	James G. Fleming	39,644	67.75
Democratic	Robert P. Jones Jr.	18,867	32.24
Total votes		58,511	100.0
Republican hold			

20th District
Party	Candidate	Votes	%
Republican	Harry A. DeMaso	35,238	58.86
Democratic	Roger Johnson (incumbent)	24,625	41.13
Total votes		59,863	100.0
Republican gain from Democratic			

21st District
Party	Candidate	Votes	%
Republican	Anthony Stamm	37,454	58.95
Democratic	Donald R. Holt Jr.	26,071	41.04
Total votes		63,525	100.0
Republican hold			

22nd District
Party	Candidate	Votes	%
Republican	Charles Zollar (incumbent)	37,670	64.80
Democratic	Paul Charles Clark	20,454	35.19
Total votes		58,124	100.0
Republican hold			

23rd District
Party	Candidate	Votes	%
Republican	Harold J. Volkema (incumbent)	49,653	72.71
Democratic	Jay A. Wabeke	18,628	27.28
Total votes		68,281	100.0
Republican hold			

24th District
Party	Candidate	Votes	%
Republican	Harold W. Hungerford	39,786	60.07
Democratic	George Langford Griffiths	26,442	39.92
Total votes		66,228	100.0
Republican hold			

25th District
Party	Candidate	Votes	%
Republican	Gordon Rockwell	38,177	52.71
Democratic	Gerald R. Dunn (incumbent)	34,245	47.28
Total votes		72,422	100.0
Republican gain from Democratic			

26th District
Party	Candidate	Votes	%
Democratic	John T. Bowman (incumbent)	34,238	61.26
Republican	James T. McDermott	21,649	38.73
Total votes		55,887	100.0
Democratic hold			

27th District
Party	Candidate	Votes	%
Democratic	James D. Gray	41,854	57.94
Republican	Harvey J. Groesbeck	30,375	42.05
Total votes		72,229	100.0
Democratic hold			

28th District
Party	Candidate	Votes	%
Republican	Frank D. Beadle (incumbent)	43,278	70.42
Democratic	John L. Dwyer	18,174	29.57
Total votes		61,452	100.0
Republican hold			

29th District
Party	Candidate	Votes	%
Democratic	Garland Lane (incumbent)	35,372	61.27
Republican	James R. Curtiss	22,355	38.72
Total votes		57,727	100.0
Democratic hold			

30th District
Party	Candidate	Votes	%
Republican	Emil Lockwood (incumbent)	42,738	65.62
Democratic	Joe Kurka Jr.	22,391	34.37
Total votes		65,129	100.0
Republican hold			

31st District
Party	Candidate	Votes	%
Republican	Robert VanderLaan (incumbent)	45,054	69.15
Democratic	Robert E. Taylor	20,099	30.84
Total votes		65,153	100.0
Republican hold			

32nd District
Party	Candidate	Votes	%
Republican	Milton Zaagman (incumbent)	38,181	62.05
Democratic	Donald L. Davis	23,351	37.94
Total votes		61,532	100.0
Republican hold			

33rd District
Party	Candidate	Votes	%
Republican	Oscar E. Bouwsma	35,054	52.14
Democratic	Jan B. Vanderploeg (incumbent)	32,167	47.85
Total votes		67,221	100.0
Republican gain from Democratic			

34th District
Party	Candidate	Votes	%
Democratic	Jerome T. Hart (incumbent)	31,761	54.78
Republican	Stewart Francke	26,213	45.21
Total votes		57,974	100.0
Democratic hold			

35th District
Party	Candidate	Votes	%
Republican	Robert Richardson (incumbent)	45,725	66.67
Democratic	Leo M. Kenny	22,859	33.32
Total votes		68,584	100.0
Republican hold			

36th District
Party	Candidate	Votes	%
Republican	John Toepp	46,725	68.58
Democratic	Walter K. Maser	21,400	31.41
Total votes		68,125	100.0
Republican hold			

37th District
Party	Candidate	Votes	%
Republican	Thomas F. Schweigert (incumbent)	39,860	60.80
Democratic	A. M. Schneider	25,699	39.19
Total votes		65,559	100.0
Republican hold			

38th District
Party	Candidate	Votes	%
Democratic	Joseph Mack (incumbent)	42,818	61.22
Republican	Stanley Wayne Elder	27,118	38.77
Total votes		69,936	100.0
Democratic hold			

== See also ==
- 1966 Michigan House of Representatives election
