= 1970 Michigan Senate election =

- November 3, 1970

All 38 seats in the Michigan Senate 20 seats needed for a majority
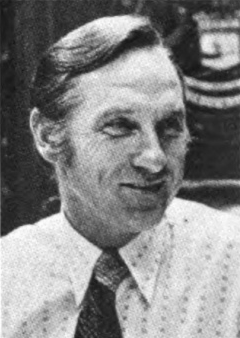

	Majority party	Minority party
Leader	Robert VanderLaan	George S. Fitzgerald
Party	Republican	Democratic
Leader since	1970	1970
Leader's seat	31st district	1st district
Last election	20	18
Seats after	19	19
Seat change	▼1	▲1
Popular vote	1,125,379	1,362,469
Percentage	45.15%	54.66%
Majority Leader before election
Robert VanderLaan
Republican
Elected Majority Leader
Robert VanderLaan
Republican

An election was held on November 3, 1970, to elect all 38 members of the Michigan Senate for the 76th Michigan Legislature. The election resulted in an even 19–19 split between Democrats and Republicans. The Republicans were able to hold on to control of the chamber due to the tie-breaking vote of the lieutenant governor.

== History ==
In the 1966 general election, the Republicans won a 20–18 majority, from what had been a Democratic majority. In January 1970, Sander Levin resigned as minority leader to seek the Democratic nomination for governor. The Democrats elected George S. Fitzgerald to succeed him. In June 1970, Emil Lockwood resigned as majority leader to seek the Republican nomination for Michigan Secretary of State. Robert VanderLaan was elected to succeed Lockwood.

The 1970 state primary was held on August 4. Nineteen incumbents faced contested primary elections, 11 Democrats and 8 Republicans. Three incumbents were unseated in the primary, all in the Detroit area. In the Democratic primary, Roger Craig was defeated by Patrick McCollough, and Raymond D. Dzendzel was defeated by Jack Faxon. Republican George Kuhn was defeated by Carl Pursell.

The general election was held on November 3. The election resulted in an even 19–19 split of Democrats and Republicans in the chamber. Republican N. Lorraine Beebe, the only woman in the state Senate, was the only incumbent ousted. She was defeated by David Plawecki. While the state Senate was evenly split, the Republicans still gained control. Governor William Milliken won re-election with his running mate, James H. Brickley. Brickley was to serve as lieutenant governor, and have a tie-breaking in the state Senate, giving Republicans the advantage. On November 11, after the general election but before the next session of the legislature, the Republicans used their state Senate majority to pass a rule change which helped ensure their control of the chamber in the next session.

After the election, VanderLaan was re-elected majority leader, and Fitzgerald was re-elected minority leader.

The state Senate was sworn in on January 13, 1971.

== Results ==
The following are the official results as printed in the 1971–1972 Michigan Manual. The official results purposefully excluded scattered write-in votes.

=== Statewide ===
Party	Candi- dates	Votes (Note: County election results in Saginaw County in the 36th district and Baraga County in the 38th district were changed and corrected, but were not updated in the official state results.)		Seats		
Party	Candi- dates	No.	%	No.	+/–	%
Republican Party	38	1,125,379	45.15%	19	▼1	50.00%
Democratic Party	38	1,362,469	54.66%	19	▲1	50.00%
American Independent Party	5	4,333	0.17%	0	Steady	0.00%
Total	81	2,492,181	100.00%	38	Steady	100.00%

=== By district ===
1st District
Party	Candidate	Votes	%
Democratic	George S. Fitzgerald (incumbent)	34,168	64.05
Republican	Keith P. Edwards	19,171	35.94
Total votes		53,339	100.0
Democratic hold			

2nd District
Party	Candidate	Votes	%
Democratic	Charles N. Youngblood Jr. (incumbent)	41,862	60.60
Republican	Ross C. Christie Jr.	27,208	39.39
Total votes		69,070	100.0
Democratic hold			

3rd District
Party	Candidate	Votes	%
Democratic	Stanley F. Rozycki (incumbent)	43,993	90.11
Republican	Dennis T. Wojnar	4,826	9.88
Total votes		48,819	100.0
Democratic hold			

4th District
Party	Candidate	Votes	%
Democratic	Coleman A. Young (incumbent)	29,909	88.66
Republican	Mary Ann Johns	3,823	11.33
Total votes		33,732	100.0
Democratic hold			

5th District
Party	Candidate	Votes	%
Democratic	Arthur Cartwright (incumbent)	26,077	83.94
Republican	Edward Joseph Mack	4,986	16.05
Total votes		31,063	100.0
Democratic hold			

6th District
Party	Candidate	Votes	%
Democratic	Basil W. Brown (incumbent)	41,580	85.35
Republican	Mary L. Dyell	7,132	14.64
Total votes		48,712	100.0
Democratic hold			

7th District
Party	Candidate	Votes	%
Democratic	Jack Faxon	45,937	72.14
Republican	William A. Allgeyer	17,739	27.85
Total votes		63,676	100.0
Democratic hold			

8th District
Party	Candidate	Votes	%
Democratic	Michael J. O'Brien (incumbent)	42,500	74.27
Republican	Ralph E. Judd	14,717	25.72
Total votes		57,217	100.0
Democratic hold			

9th District
Party	Candidate	Votes	%
Democratic	Stanley Novak (incumbent)	42,766	90.98
Republican	Herman L. Keppner	4,236	9.01
Total votes		47,002	100.0
Democratic hold			

10th District
Party	Candidate	Votes	%
Democratic	Patrick McCollough	45,541	75.53
Republican	Kenneth O. Evans	14,753	24.46
Total votes		60,294	100.0
Democratic hold			

11th District
Party	Candidate	Votes	%
Democratic	John E. McCauley (incumbent)	38,003	64.18
Republican	William Nichols	21,205	35.81
Total votes		59,208	100.0
Democratic hold			

12th District
Party	Candidate	Votes	%
Democratic	David Plawecki	39,689	52.65
Republican	N. Lorraine Beebe (incumbent)	35,001	46.43
American Independent	Peter Bill	680	0.90
Total votes		75,370	100.0
Democratic gain from Republican			

13th District
Party	Candidate	Votes	%
Democratic	William Faust (incumbent)	44,633	76.12
Republican	Anthony A. Bielecki Jr.	13,995	23.87
Total votes		58,628	100.0
Democratic hold			

14th District
Party	Candidate	Votes	%
Republican	Carl Pursell	55,082	59.05
Democratic	Paul Kadish	38,192	40.94
Total votes		93,274	100.0
Republican hold			

15th District
Party	Candidate	Votes	%
Democratic	Daniel S. Cooper	52,090	69.59
Republican	Donald Black	22,757	30.40
Total votes		74,847	100.0
Democratic hold			

16th District
Party	Candidate	Votes	%
Republican	Donald E. Bishop	60,644	68.36
Democratic	Sallie H. Eckert	28,060	31.63
Total votes		88,704	100.0
Republican hold			

17th District
Party	Candidate	Votes	%
Republican	L. Harvey Lodge (incumbent)	31,268	51.07
Democratic	Carl W. O'Brien	29,950	48.92
Total votes		61,218	100.0
Republican hold			

18th District
Party	Candidate	Votes	%
Republican	Gilbert E. Bursley (incumbent)	42,130	59.97
Democratic	George Wahr Sallade	28,113	40.02
Total votes		70,243	100.0
Republican hold			

District
Party	Candidate	Votes	%
Republican	James G. Fleming (incumbent)	36,865	60.35
Democratic	Dale A. Haught	24,215	39.64
Total votes		61,080	100.0
Republican hold			

20th District
Party	Candidate	Votes	%
Republican	Harry A. DeMaso (incumbent)	33,677	55.23
Democratic	Roger Johnson	27,294	44.76
Total votes		60,971	100.0
Republican hold			

21st District
Party	Candidate	Votes	%
Republican	Anthony Stamm (incumbent)	40,080	58.84
Democratic	William L. Furniss	28,031	41.15
Total votes		68,111	100.0
Republican hold			

22nd District
Party	Candidate	Votes	%
Republican	Charles Zollar (incumbent)	36,658	60.82
Democratic	Paul C. Clark	23,145	38.40
American Independent	Shelton M. Carr	469	0.77
Total votes		60,272	100.0
Republican hold			

23rd District
Party	Candidate	Votes	%
Republican	Gary Byker (incumbent)	49,410	64.99
Democratic	Chester J. Harmsen	26,609	35.00
Total votes		76,019	100.0
Republican hold			

24th District
Party	Candidate	Votes	%
Republican	Philip O. Pittenger (Note: Official state results show Philip Pittenger winning the 24th district's election over Leonard Stuttman by 583 votes. A recount, requested by Stuttman, began in January 1971. It was concluded early. The recount had affirmed Pittenger's victory, and shown he had won by 601 votes.)	37,085	49.98
Democratic	Leonard Milton Stuttman	36,502	49.20
American Independent	Leo J. Miller	599	0.80
Total votes		74,186	100.0
Republican hold			

25th District
Party	Candidate	Votes	%
Republican	Gordon Rockwell (incumbent)	45,165	52.09
Democratic	James N. Callahan	41,527	47.90
Total votes		86,692	100.0
Republican hold			

26th District
Party	Candidate	Votes	%
Democratic	John T. Bowman (incumbent)	47,758	74.35
Republican	Walter Hallman	16,473	25.64
Total votes		64,231	100.0
Democratic hold			

27th District
Party	Candidate	Votes	%
Democratic	James D. Gray (incumbent)	68,954	69.57
Republican	Ronald McDowell	30,160	30.42
Total votes		99,114	100.0
Democratic hold			

28th District
Party	Candidate	Votes	%
Republican	Alvin J. DeGrow (incumbent)	40,173	62.17
Democratic	Alexander Wnuk	24,437	37.82
Total votes		64,610	100.0
Republican hold			

29th District
Party	Candidate	Votes	%
Democratic	Garland Lane (incumbent)	38,770	70.77
Republican	Harvey Gerdes	13,969	25.49
American Independent	Dan Elvin Griffin	2,044	3.73
Total votes		54,783	100.0
Democratic hold			

30th District
Party	Candidate	Votes	%
Republican	Bill Ballenger	44,733	61.78
Democratic	Cedric Root	27,670	38.21
Total votes		72,403	100.0
Republican hold			

31st District
Party	Candidate	Votes	%
Republican	Robert VanderLaan (incumbent)	52,387	65.85
Democratic	Charles B. Reintges	27,162	34.14
Total votes		79,549	100.0
Republican hold			

32nd District
Party	Candidate	Votes	%
Republican	Milton Zaagman (incumbent)	34,475	55.90
Democratic	Stephen V. Monsma	26,654	43.22
American Independent	Harold Tilma	541	0.87
Total votes		61,670	100.0
Republican hold			

33rd District
Party	Candidate	Votes	%
Republican	Oscar E. Bouwsma (incumbent)	35,329	53.31
Democratic	Walter Abbott Jr.	30,932	46.68
Total votes		66,261	100.0
Republican hold			

34th District
Party	Candidate	Votes	%
Democratic	Jerome T. Hart (incumbent)	39,438	65.81
Republican	Carl J. Wright	20,483	34.18
Total votes		59,921	100.0
Democratic hold			

35th District
Party	Candidate	Votes	%
Republican	Robert Richardson (incumbent)	46,006	59.69
Democratic	John D. Prior	31,064	40.30
Total votes		77,070	100.0
Republican hold			

36th District
Party	Candidate	Votes	%
Republican	John Toepp (incumbent)	47,796	65.84
Democratic	Erika Belmoor	24,789	34.15
Total votes		72,585	100.0
Republican hold			

37th District
Party	Candidate	Votes	%
Republican	Bob Davis	38,287	55.65
Democratic	Russel M. Lee	30,506	44.34
Total votes		68,793	100.0
Republican hold			

38th District
Party	Candidate	Votes	%
Democratic	Joseph Mack (incumbent)	43,949	63.28
Republican	Miodrag Georgevich	25,495	36.71
Total votes		69,444	100.0
Democratic hold			

== See also ==
- 1970 Michigan House of Representatives election
