= Gerald Dunn =

Gerald Dunn may refer to:

- Ged Dunn, English rugby union and rugby league player
- Gerald R. Dunn, Michigan politician
