= Senator Lockwood =

Senator Lockwood may refer to:

- Charles C. Lockwood (1877–1958), New York State Senate
- Emil Lockwood (1919–2002), Michigan Senate State Senate
