= Creighton Coleman =

Creighton Coleman may refer to:

- Creighton B. Coleman (born 1956), South Carolina politician
- Creighton R. Coleman (1912–1992), Michigan politician and jurist
