= Senator Coleman (disambiguation) =

Norm Coleman (born 1949) is a former U.S. Senator from Minnesota from 2003 to 2009. Senator Coleman may also refer to:

- Creighton R. Coleman (1912–1992), Michigan State Senate
- Eric D. Coleman (born 1951), Connecticut State Senate
- John C. Coleman (1823–1919), California State Senate
- Julia Coleman (politician) (born 1991), Minnesota State Senate
- Linda Coleman-Madison, Alabama State Senate
- Maida Coleman (born 1954), Missouri State Senate
- Marshall Coleman (born 1942), Virginia State Senate
- Nick Coleman (1925–1981), Minnesota State Senate
- Thomas Coleman (New York politician) (1808–1894), New York State Senate
- Tom Coleman (Georgia politician) (1928–2014), Georgia State Senate
- William D. Coleman (politician) (1842–1908), Liberian Senator

== See also ==
- Edward Colman (American politician) (1828–1898), Wisconsin State Senate
