= Thomas Albert (politician) =

American politician (born 1985)

Member of the Michigan Senate from the 18th district
- Incumbent
- Assumed office January 1, 2023
- Preceded by: Jeff Irwin

Member of the Michigan House of Representatives from the 86th district
- In office January 1, 2017 – December 31, 2022
- Preceded by: Lisa Posthumus Lyons
- Succeeded by: Nancy De Boer

Personal details
- Born: April 12, 1985 (age 41) Grattan Township, Michigan, U.S.
- Party: Republican
- Children: 5
- Education: University of Michigan (BA); Michigan State University (MBA)

Military service
- Branch/service: United States Marine Corps
- Years of service: 2007–2011 (active duty); 2011–2013 (reserve)
- Unit: United States Marine Corps Reserve (2011–2013)
- Battles/wars: Iraq War

Thomas A. Albert (born April 12, 1985) is an American politician serving as a Republican member of the Michigan Senate for the 18th district. Albert previously served as a member of the Michigan House of Representatives for the 86th district.

== Early life and education ==
Albert was born in Grattan Township, Michigan, on April 12, 1985, to Jim Albert, a teacher, and Edna Albert, a social worker. He is the youngest of five brothers. He attended elementary school in Ada Township, Michigan, and attended Belding High School.

Albert earned a Bachelor of Arts degree in political science and history from the University of Michigan in 2007 and an MBA in finance from Michigan State University in 2013.

== Career ==
After graduating from college, Albert was commissioned as an officer in the United States Marine Corps. He served as an advisor to the Iraqi Ground Forces and remained in the Marine Corps Reserve until 2013.

After earning his MBA, Albert worked as an investor at the Michigan Office of Retirement Services. In 2013, he became an investment analyst at the Michigan Bureau of Investments.

On November 8, 2016, he won the election and became a Republican member of the Michigan House of Representatives for the 86th district. Albert defeated Lynn Mason, Bill Gelineau, and Cliff Yankovich with 59.79% of the votes. On November 8, 2018, Albert won re-election. He defeated Lauren Taylor and Sue Norman with 60.0% of the votes.

In 2022, Albert was elected to the Michigan Senate from the 18th district.

== Personal life ==
Albert's wife is Erica, a teacher. They have five children.

== See also ==
- 2016 Michigan House of Representatives election
- 2018 Michigan House of Representatives election
