= Jack Faxon =

American politician (1936–2020)

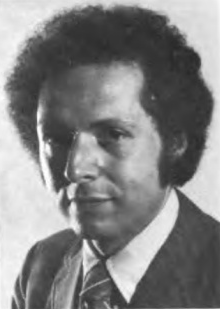

Member of the Michigan Senate from the 7th district
- In office January 13, 1971 – January 11, 1995
- Preceded by: Raymond D. Dzendzel
- Succeeded by: David M. Honigman
- Constituency: 7th district (1971–1983); 15th district (1983–1995)

Member of the Michigan House of Representatives from the 15th district
- In office January 13, 1965 – January 13, 1971
- Preceded by: District established
- Succeeded by: Alma G. Stallworth

Personal details
- Born: June 9, 1936 Detroit, MI, U.S.
- Died: January 9, 2020 (aged 83) Oak Park, MI, U.S.
- Party: Democratic

Jack Faxon (June 9, 1936 – January 9, 2020) was an American politician and educator from the U.S. state of Michigan.

== Background ==
Faxon was born in Detroit, Michigan, and graduated from Central High School in Detroit. He received his bachelor's and master's degrees in education from Wayne State University. Faxon also received a master's degree in history from the University of Michigan. He taught in Detroit and Farmington Hills, Michigan, and served as headmaster of Lycée International for exchange students in Southfield, Michigan during the early 1980's.

== Political career ==
Faxon served in the Michigan Constitutional Convention of 1961 and 1962. He also served in the Michigan House of Representatives from the 15th district from 1965 to 1971 and in the Michigan Senate from 1971 to 1995. Faxon was a Democrat.

== Death ==
Faxon died due to complications with lymphoma on January 9, 2020, in Oak Park, Michigan at age 83.
