= Gerald R. Dunn =

American politician

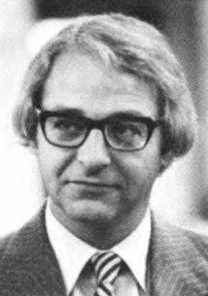

Member of the Michigan Senate from the 25th district
- In office January 1, 1965 – 1966
- Preceded by: Emil Lockwood
- Succeeded by: Gordon Rockwell

Personal details
- Born: December 20, 1934 Saginaw, Michigan
- Died: March 22, 2005 (aged 70) Garden City, Michigan
- Party: Democratic
- Education: Central Michigan University

Gerald Raymond Dunn (December 20, 1934 – March 22, 2005) was a Michigan politician.

== Early life ==
Dunn was born on December 20, 1934, in Saginaw, Michigan, to parents Roy and Mae Dunn. Dunn graduated from Central Michigan University with a bachelor's degree and did graduate work at the University of Michigan.

== Career ==
On November 4, 1964, Dunn was elected to the Michigan Senate where he represented the 25th district from January 13, 1965, to 1966. He was not re-elected in 1966. In 1968, Dunn was a delegate to the Democratic National Convention from Michigan. Dunn served as a member of University of Michigan board of regents from 1969 to 1984.

== Personal life ==
Dunn was married Patricia A. Luptowski in 1958. Together they had four children. Dunn later married Marilyn C. Dunn.

== Death ==
Dunn died of cancer on March 22, 2005, in Garden City, Michigan. Dunn donated his body to the University of Michigan Medical School Department of Anatomy.
