= Lester O. Begick =

American politician (1926–1991)

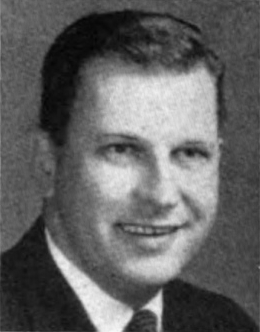
Michigan State Senator Lester O. Begick

Lester O. Begick (February 17, 1926 – December 7, 1991) was an American businessman and politician.

Begick was born in Bay City, Bay County, Michigan and graduated from Michigan State University in 1950. He served in the United States Army Reserve and was commissioned a colonel. Begick was the owner of the Begick Nursery and Garden Center in Bay City. Begick served in the Michigan House of Representatives in 1961 and 1962 and then served in the Michigan Senate in 1963 and 1964. He was a Republican.
