= J. Edward Hutchinson =

American politician (1914–1985)

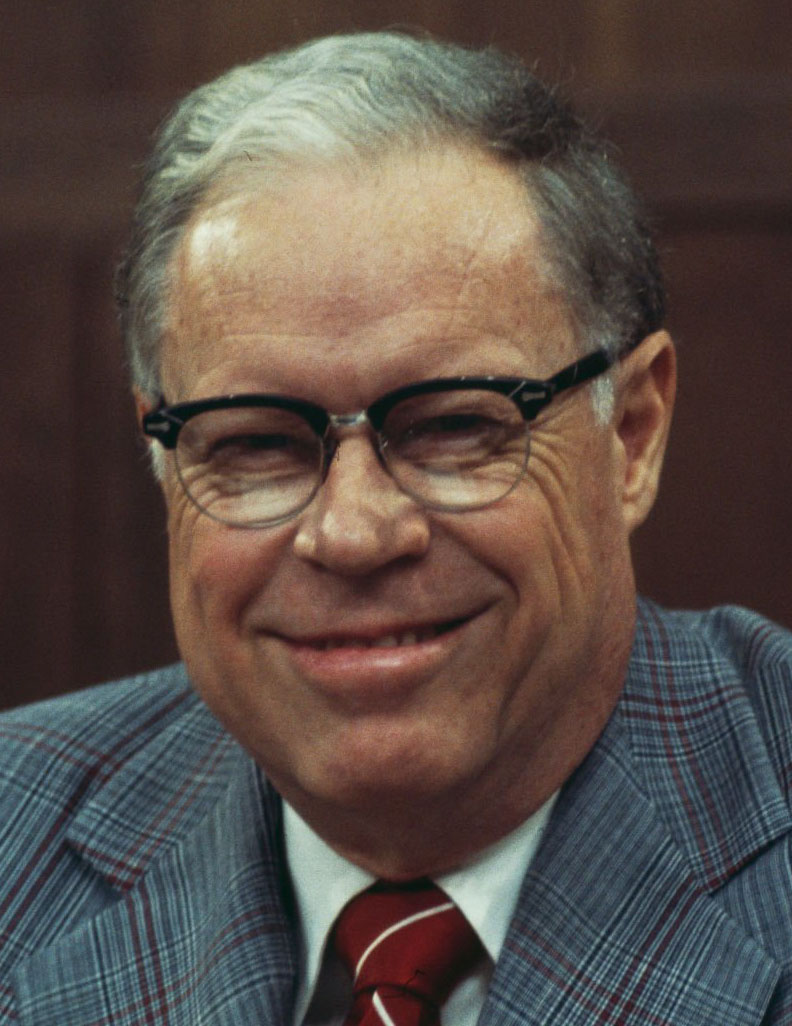

Member of the U.S. House of Representatives from Michigan's 4th district
- In office January 3, 1963 – January 3, 1977
- Preceded by: Clare Hoffman
- Succeeded by: David Stockman

Member of the Michigan Senate from the 8th district
- In office January 1, 1951 – January 1, 1961
- Preceded by: Harold D. Tripp
- Succeeded by: Frederic Hilbert

Member of the Michigan House of Representatives from the Allegan County district
- In office January 1, 1947 – January 1, 1951
- Preceded by: Frederick T. Miles
- Succeeded by: Ben E. Lohman

Personal details
- Born: October 13, 1914 Fennville, Michigan, US
- Died: July 22, 1985 (aged 70) Naples, Florida, US
- Resting place: Fennville Cemetery, Fennville, Michigan
- Party: Republican
- Spouse: Janice Eleanor Caton (m. 1959)
- Education: University of Michigan Law School (J.D., 1938); University of Michigan (A.B., 1936)

Military service
- Allegiance: United States
- Branch/service: United States Army
- Years of service: January 1941 – April 1946
- Unit: 14th Coast Artillery; Transportation Corps
- Battles/wars: World War II

J. Edward Hutchinson (October 13, 1914 – July 22, 1985) was an American lawyer and politician from the state of Michigan. A member of the Republican Party, he represented Michigan's 4th congressional district in the United States House of Representatives from 1963 to 1977.

== Early life ==
Hutchinson was born in Fennville, Michigan and graduated from Fennville High School in 1932. He graduated from the University of Michigan in Ann Arbor in 1936, and was a member of Acacia fraternity. He graduated from the University of Michigan Law School in 1938, and was admitted to the State Bar of Michigan that same year. Hutchinson thereupon established a law practice in Allegan, Michigan.

Hutchinson enlisted as a private in the United States Army in January 1941, served as a noncommissioned officer in the Fourteenth Coast Artillery, as a captain in the Transportation Corps, and was discharged in April 1946.

== Political career ==
Hutchinson was elected to the Michigan House of Representatives in 1946 and 1948, and was a member of the Michigan Senate, 1951-1960. He was a delegate to the 1948 Republican National Convention and chairman of the Republican State convention in April 1952. He was delegate and vice president of the constitutional convention, in 1961 and 1962 that resulted in the Michigan Constitution of 1963.

Hutchinson was elected as a Republican from Michigan's 4th congressional district to the 88th United States Congress and to the six succeeding Congresses, serving from January 3, 1963 to January 3, 1977). He was not a candidate for reelection in 1976. He was the ranking Republican on the Judiciary Committee during the impeachment process against Richard Nixon. Although long considered loyal to Nixon, in August 1974 Hutchinson called for Nixon's resignation or impeachment because of the Watergate scandal. He had voted against the articles of impeachment in committee, but joined his colleagues in announcing his support for impeachment on the House floor.

== Later life ==
Hutchinson returned to Fennville after retiring from Congress. He died in Naples, Florida on July 22, 1985, at the age of 70 years. He is buried at the Fennville Cemetery.

U.S. House of Representatives
Preceded by Clare Hoffman	United States Representative for the 4th congressional district of Michigan; 1963 – 1977	Succeeded by David Stockman
Preceded by William Moore McCulloch	Ranking Member of the House Judiciary Committee; 1973 – 1977	Succeeded by Robert McClory
