= Gilbert E. Bursley =

American politician (1913–1998)

Member of the Michigan Senate from the 18th district
- In office January 1, 1965 – 1978
- Preceded by: Raymond D. Dzendzel
- Succeeded by: Edward C. Pierce

Member of the Michigan House of Representatives from the Washtenaw County 1st district
- In office 1961–1964
- Preceded by: George Wahr Sallade
- Succeeded by: District abolished

Personal details
- Born: February 28, 1913 Ann Arbor, Michigan, US
- Died: September 20, 1998 (aged 85) Lee County, Florida, US
- Party: Republican
- Education: University of Michigan; Harvard Business School

Gilbert Everette Bursley (February 28, 1913 – September 20, 1998) was an American politician who served in the Michigan House of Representatives from 1961 to 1964 and the Michigan Senate from 1965 to 1978.
