= Creighton R. Coleman =

American politician

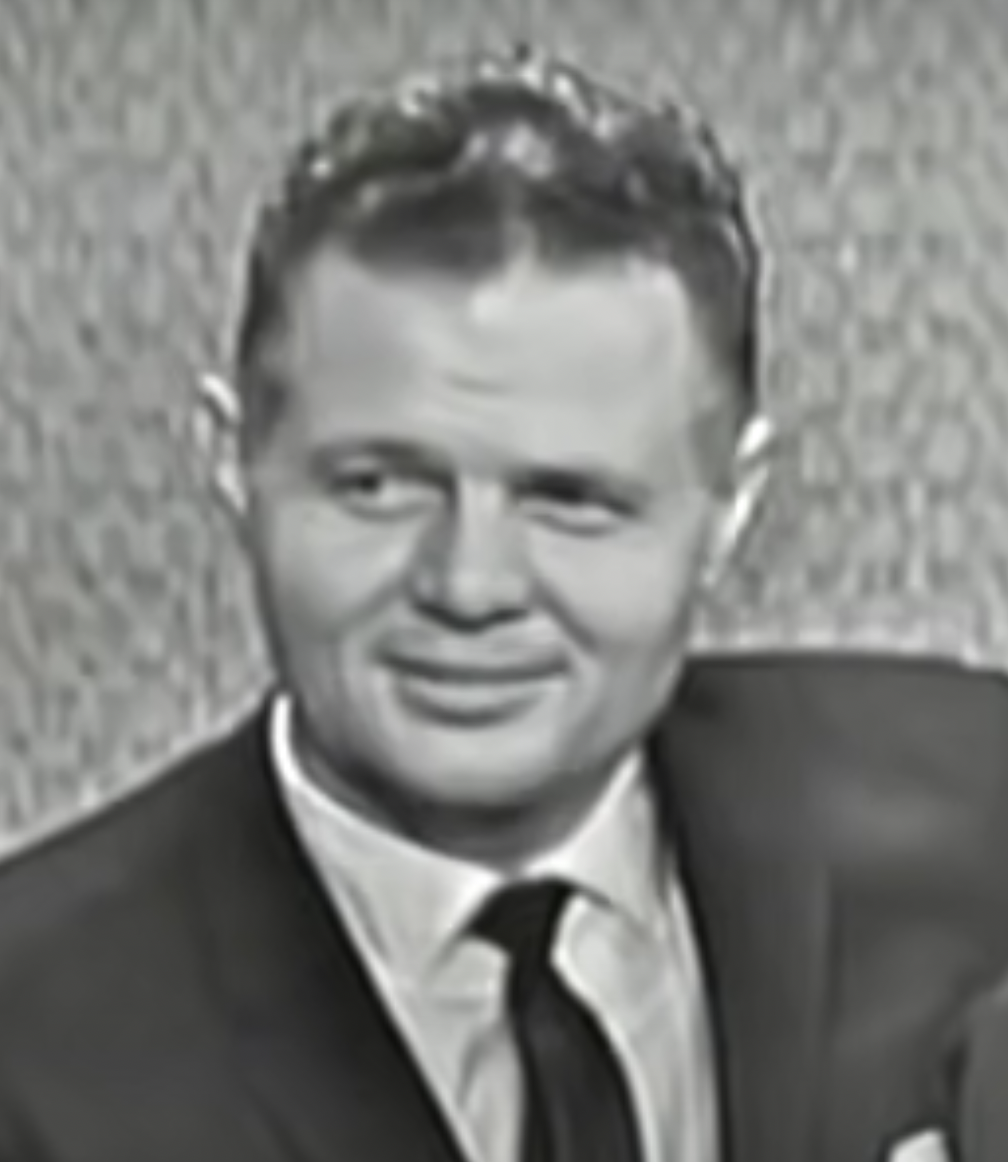
- Creighton R. Coleman in 1961

Judge of Michigan's 37th Circuit Court
- In office 1960–1982

Member of the Michigan Senate from the 9th district
- In office January 1, 1949 – December 31, 1956
- Preceded by: Robert J. Hamilton
- Succeeded by: John P. Smeekens

Personal details
- Born: February 17, 1912 Marshall, Michigan, US
- Died: September 8, 1992 (aged 80) Ocala, Florida, US
- Spouse: Mary S. Coleman

Creighton R. Coleman (1912-1992) was a judge and a member of the Michigan Senate.

== Career ==
He served in the United States Navy during World War II and was elected to the Senate in 1949. He was an unsuccessful candidate for Congress in 1956, losing to the incumbent August E. Johansen in the primary, and left the Senate that year. Four years later, he became a circuit judge, serving on the bench for 22 years.

Coleman was the assistant chief of the decartelization branch of the economics division in the Office of Military Government, United States in Germany after the war.

== Personal life ==
He was married to Mary S. Coleman, a jurist in her own right and a former chief justice of the Michigan Supreme Court.
