= Frederic Hilbert =

American politician (1912–2014)

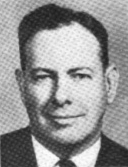

Member of the Michigan Senate from the 8th district
- In office 1961–1964
- Preceded by: J. Edward Hutchinson
- Succeeded by: Michael J. O'Brien

Personal details
- Born: October 15, 1912 Syracuse, New York, U.S.
- Died: July 4, 2014 (aged 101) Grand Rapids, Michigan, U.S.
- Party: Republican
- Spouse(s): LaVerna Leggett (died); Evelyn
- Children: four
- Education: Western Michigan University
- Occupation: businessman

Frederic Hilbert (October 15, 1912 – July 4, 2014) was an American politician from the state of Michigan. He served in the Michigan State Senate from 1961 to 1964.
