= Harold M. Ryan =

American politician

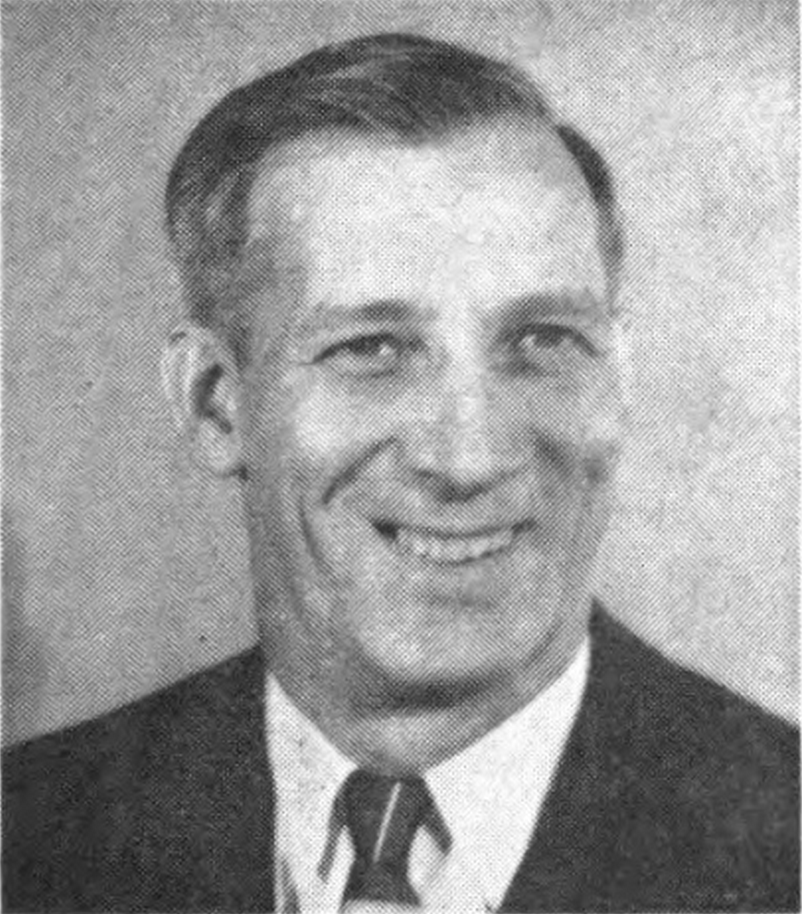

Member of the U.S. House of Representatives from Michigan's 14th district
- In office February 13, 1962 – January 3, 1965
- Preceded by: Louis C. Rabaut
- Succeeded by: Lucien Nedzi

Member of the Michigan Senate from the 1st district
- In office 1949–1962
- Preceded by: Matthew F. Callahan
- Succeeded by: Charles N. Youngblood Jr.

Personal details
- Born: Harold Martin Ryan; February 6, 1911 Detroit, Michigan, U.S.
- Died: March 8, 2007 (aged 96) St. Clair Shores, Michigan, U.S.
- Education: Ferris State University, Michigan State University, University of Detroit Law School
- Profession: lawyer

Harold Martin Ryan (February 6, 1911 – March 8, 2007) was a politician and judge from the U.S. state of Michigan. He was twice elected to the United States House of Representatives, serving from 1962 to 1965.

== Early life and career ==
Ryan was born in Detroit, Michigan. He graduated from St. Joseph's High School in 1929. He attended Ferris Institute (now Ferris State University of Big Rapids, Michigan 1929-1930 as well as attended Michigan State College (now Michigan State University) of East Lansing 1930–1932. He received a J.D. from the University of Detroit Law School in 1935 and admitted to the bar the same year and engaged in private practice. He later assistant prosecuting attorney of Wayne County, 1945–1946.

== Political career ==
Ryan served as a member of the Michigan Senate from 1949 to 1962, where he represented the 1st district, and was minority leader for the final six years. He was a delegate to Michigan state conventions every two years from 1940 to 1970 and a delegate to the Democratic National Conventions of 1956, 1960, and 1964.

On February 13, 1962, in a special election, to fill the vacancy caused by the death of U.S. Representative Louis C. Rabaut, Ryan was elected as a Democrat from Michigan's 14th congressional district to the 87th Congress. In November 1962, Ryan was reelected to a full term in the 88th Congress, serving from February 13, 1962 to January 3, 1965. He was an unsuccessful candidate for re-nomination to the 89th Congress in 1964, losing to fellow Democrat Lucien N. Nedzi. He also lost against Nedzi in the primaries two years later.

== After Congress ==
A decade after leaving Congress, he served as circuit judge of Wayne County for the third judicial circuit of Michigan from 1976 to 1985. He was a visiting judge from 1985 to 2006.

Harold M. Ryan was a Catholic and a member of Knights of Columbus, Lions, and Gamma Eta Gamma.

=== Death ===
He lived in St. Clair Shores, Michigan until his death of congestive heart failure on March 8, 2007 at 96 years of age.

U.S. House of Representatives
Preceded by Louis C. Rabaut	United States Representative for the 14th congressional district of Michigan; 1962–1965	Succeeded by Lucien N. Nedzi
