= Robert VanderLaan =

American politician

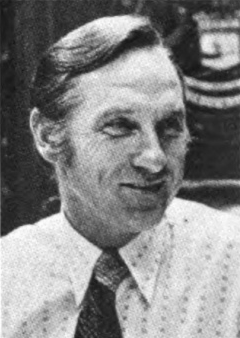

5th Majority Leader of the Michigan Senate
- In office 1970–1974
- Preceded by: Emil Lockwood
- Succeeded by: Milton Zaagman

Member of the Michigan Senate
- In office January 1, 1963 – December 31, 1982
- Preceded by: Charles R. Feenstra
- Succeeded by: Dick Posthumus
- Constituency: 17th district (1963–1964); 31st district (1965–1982)

Personal details
- Born: June 4, 1930 Paris Township, Michigan
- Died: November 1, 2015 (aged 85)
- Party: Republican

Robert "Robbie" VanderLaan (June 4, 1930 – November 1, 2015) was a former majority leader of the Michigan State Senate. He began serving as majority leader in June 1970, after the resignation of incumbent Majority Leader Emil Lockwood, who was running for Michigan Secretary of State. A Republican, he ran to replace Gerald Ford as representative for Michigan's 5th congressional district in a 1974 special election, but was defeated by Democrat Richard Vander Veen. It was seen as a stunning upset; VanderLaan had previously never lost an election and the district had long been considered a Republican stronghold. He served in the Senate for 20 years in total; after retirement he joined Democrat Bobby Crim in forming a lobbying firm; he also had a career as a lawyer.
