= L. Harvey Lodge =

American politician

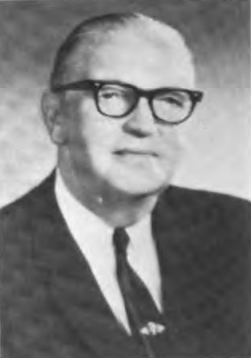

Member of the Michigan Senate from the 17th district
- In office January 1, 1967 – December 31, 1974
- Preceded by: Carl W. O'Brien
- Succeeded by: Kerry K. Kammer

Member of the Michigan Senate from the 12th district
- In office January 1, 1957 – December 31, 1960
- Preceded by: William S. Broomfield
- Succeeded by: Farrell E. Roberts

Member of the Michigan House of Representatives from the Oakland County 2nd district
- In office January 1, 1947 – December 31, 1948
- Preceded by: Charles E. Yaeger
- Succeeded by: Leaun Harrelson

Personal details
- Born: November 8, 1902 Milford, Michigan, US
- Died: May 6, 1976 (aged 73) Waterford Township, Michigan, US
- Party: Republican
- Spouse: Rhea
- Education: University of Michigan Law School (LL.B.); University of Michigan
- Profession: Lawyer

Luther Harvey Lodge (8 November 1902 – 6 May 1976) was a Republican member of both houses of the Michigan Legislature between 1947 and 1974.

Born in 1902 and a graduate of the University of Michigan Law School, Lodge was an assistant attorney general in 1936 and was later elected Oakland County prosecuting attorney. He served one term in the Michigan House of Representatives from part of Oakland County, being defeated for re-election in 1948. A decade later, he won election to the Michigan Senate and served two terms; he was defeated for re-election in 1960. Finally, Lodge served two more terms in the Senate, including one year as president pro tempore in 1974, and was defeated for re-election that year. Lodge was best known for shepherding the state's no-fault auto insurance law through the legislature, and was an opponent of both income tax and open housing. He was known to give out gold-colored cufflinks and coins with his likeness. After he left the legislature, workers found an oil painting of him on a wall in the State Capitol ordinarily reserved for those of past governors.

Lodge served as a delegate to the 1944 Republican National Convention which nominated Michigan native Thomas Dewey for President of the United States. He was also a member of numerous civic and professional associations.
