= Charles N. Youngblood Jr. =

American politician

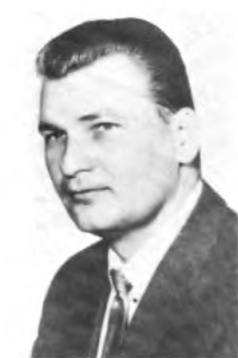

Member of the Michigan Senate
- In office January 1, 1963 – January 9, 1974
- Preceded by: Harold M. Ryan
- Succeeded by: John C. Hertel
- Constituency: 1st district (1963-1964); 2nd district (1964-1974)

Personal details
- Born: April 24, 1932 Detroit, Michigan, U.S.
- Died: September 2, 2017 (aged 85) Michigan, U.S.
- Party: Democratic

Military service
- Branch/service: United States Navy
- Battles/wars: Korean War

Charles N. Youngblood Jr. (April 24, 1932 – September 2, 2017) was an American politician who served as a Democratic member of the Michigan Senate from 1963 until his resignation in 1974.

== Early life and education ==
Born in Detroit in 1932, Youngblood attended Denby High School and Wayne State University.

== Career ==
Youngblood served in the United States Navy during the Korean War and was a deputy sheriff in Wayne County. Youngblood was elected to the 1961 Constitutional Convention.

Youngblood was convicted of conspiracy to bribe a public official over a liquor license and resigned from the Senate in 1974.

Youngblood died in Michigan's Upper Peninsula in 2017.
