= Charles O. McManiman =

American politician (born 1957)

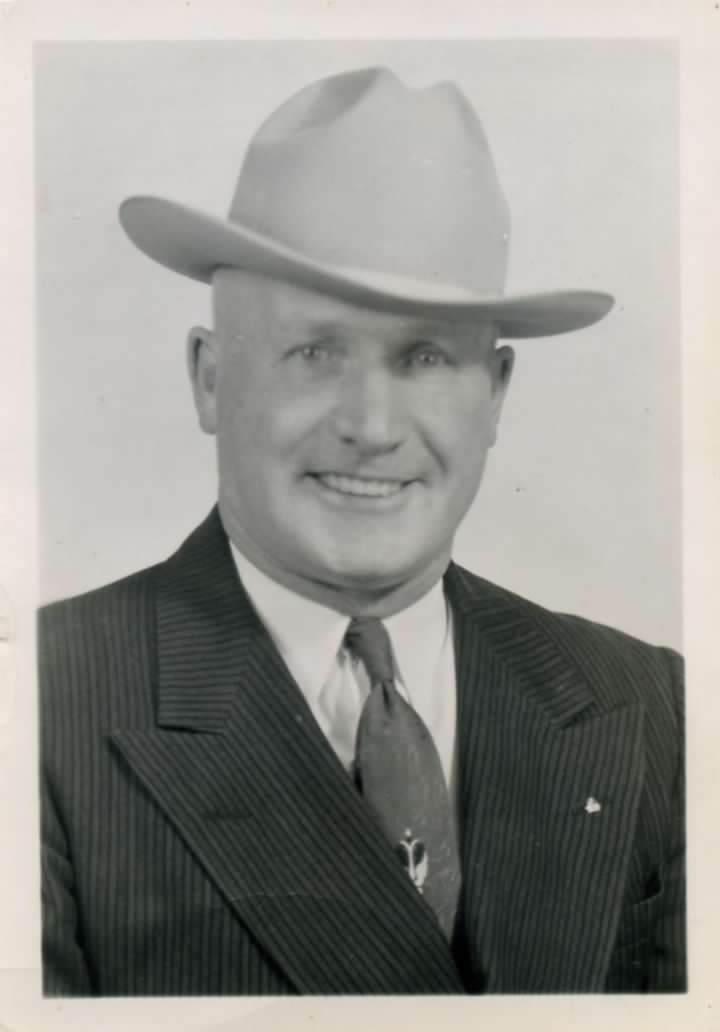

Member of the Michigan Senate from the 32nd district
- In office January 14, 1959 – December 31, 1964
- Preceded by: Leo H. Roy
- Succeeded by: Joseph Mack

Mayor of Houghton
- In office 1952–1955

Personal details
- Born: March 3, 1900 Calumet, Michigan
- Died: May 4, 1982 (aged 82) Hancock, Michigan
- Party: Democratic
- Children: 3

Charles O. McManiman (March 3, 1900 – May 4, 1982) was a Democratic politician who served as Mayor of Houghton, Michigan, as well as a member of the Michigan Senate for the 32nd district representing much of the Upper Peninsula of Michigan

== Early life ==
Born in Calumet, Michigan, in 1900, McManiman in his youth learned the trade of blacksmithing from his father, an immigrant from Canada.

== Political career ==
Prior to his senate career McManiman served as mayor of his home city of Houghton, Michigan, along with participating in different races for the Michigan House of Representatives. Several years after the end of his term as mayor, McManiman ran for the Michigan Senate for the 32nd district and won. McManiman served as the senator for the Upper Peninsula of Michigan and strived to advocate for the growth of industry in the Peninsula amongst other issues.
