= Arthur A. Dehmel =

American politician

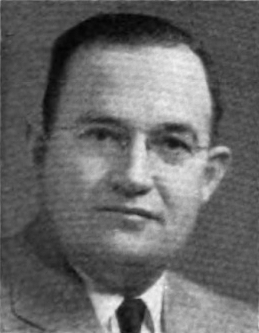
Arthur A. Dehmel

Arthur A. Dehmel (July 6, 1906 – February 8, 1992) was an American politician. He represented the former 20th District of Michigan, as a member of the Michigan Senate from 1955 until 1964 for Huron, Sanilac, and Tuscola counties located in The Thumb region of the US state of Michigan. His service to the people of Michigan influenced agriculture, transportation, tourism, legislative jurisprudence, and especially, education.

His early role as a member of the Unionville High School Board of Education led to many impacts on statewide education, later culminating when he became a member of the Senate Appropriations Committee and chairperson of its subcommittee on Education. Demonstrating a high regard for education, his message at home was equally auspicious. As his young daughter reached that well-known age for swooning, "Get your education first!" was his well-worn sentiment.

The July 31, 1964, edition of the Kingston Enterprise offered the following words when describing Senator Dehmel's contributions, "Recognized as one of the leading crop farmers in the Thumb, Senator Dehmel has distinguished himself in the Senate, not only in the agricultural field but also in other areas. He is third ranking member of the all-important Appropriations Committee of the Senate and chairman of the subcommittee on Education. He is chairman of the Insurance Committee, a member of the Legislative Audit Committee and a member of Agriculture, Tourist, Industries, and Highway Committees." Dehmel served on the Senate Appropriations Committee for eight years.

Retiring from the Senate after a decade of public service, Dehmel then accepted an appointment by Governor George W. Romney to a post within the Michigan Department of Agriculture, where he served from 1964 until 1974. He received the Award of Merit for Service to Agriculture at the 1962 Annual Agricultural Conference.

Born in Unionville, Michigan in 1906, Dehmel was the oldest child of Fred and Marie (Ziefle) Dehmel. Before his years in the Senate, he served in many roles within Michigan local government, including as Chairperson of the Tuscola County Board of Supervisors, Supervisor of Columbia Township (1945–1955), Treasurer of the Unionville Public Schools, Chairperson of Tuscola Council Veterans Affairs, among others. Throughout his life, he lived on and operated the farm he had known since birth. He was also a patron of the Unionville Moravian Church, especially known for his work as Superintendent of the Sunday School.

According to William Kulsea of the Lansing State Journal, “A farmer from Michigan's Thumb area... is determined to give every child an equal opportunity for education at minimal cost to the taxpayer".

Arthur Dehmel was married to Edwina Pike (1913–2005) of Fairgrove, Michigan. They had two children Richard (Dick) and Anne, both of Caro, Michigan.
