= Philip Rahoi =

American politician

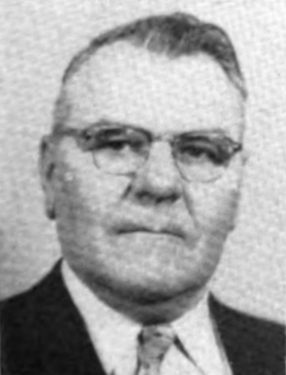

Member of the Michigan Senate
- In office 1955–1966

Member of the Michigan House of Representatives
- In office 1935–1937

Personal details
- Born: April 5, 1896 Iron Mountain, Michigan, U.S.
- Died: March 11, 1980 (aged 83) Kingsford, Michigan, U.S.
- Party: Democratic
- Spouse: Elsa Halgren (m. 1918)
- Children: 5

Philip J. Rahoi (April 5, 1896 – March 11, 1980) was an American politician who served as a member of both chambers of the Michigan Legislature and as the mayor of Iron Mountain, Michigan;

== Background ==
Born in Iron Mountain, Michigan, Rahoi served in the Michigan House of Representatives in 1935. He then served in the Michigan State Senate from 1955 until 1966. He also served as mayor of Iron Mountain, Michigan. Rahoi was a Democrat. He died in Kingsford, Michigan.
