= Kent T. Lundgren =

American pharmacist and politician (1914–1986)

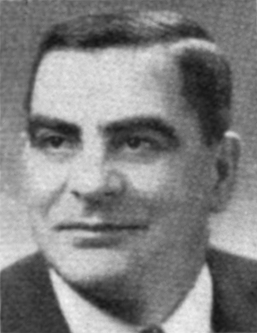
Michigan State Senator Kent T. Lundgren

Kent T. Lundgren (July 7, 1914 – August 26, 1986) was an American pharmacist and politician.

Born in Saint Paul, Minnesota, Lundgren served in the United States Army during World War II. He received his bachelor's degree in pharmaceutical science from University of Wisconsin–Madison. He was a pharmacist in Menominee, Michigan and was the owner of the Lundgren Drug Company. Lundgren served in the Michigan Constitutional Convention of 1962. He then served in the Michigan State Senate from 1962 to 1964 and was a Republican. Lundgren died at the Veterans Administration Hospital in Iron Mountain, Michigan.
