= Haskell L. Nichols =

American politician

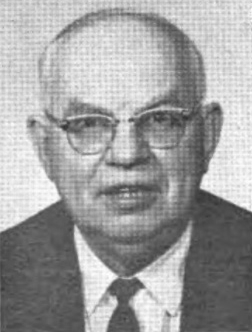

Member of the Michigan Senate
- In office January 1, 1943 – December 31, 1966
- Preceded by: C. Jay Town
- Succeeded by: James G. Fleming
- Constituency: 10th district (1943–1964); 19th district (1965–1966)

Member of the Michigan House of Representatives from the Jackson County 1st district
- In office January 1, 1939 – December 31, 1942
- Preceded by: Charles W. Snow, Jr.
- Succeeded by: John W. Bannasch
- In office January 1, 1933 – December 31, 1936
- Preceded by: Harry E. Barnard
- Succeeded by: Charles W. Snow, Jr.

Personal details
- Born: Haskell Linton Nichols; July 28, 1896 Homer, Michigan
- Died: April 30, 1991 (aged 94) Columbia Township, Jackson County, Michigan
- Party: Republican
- Spouse: Mary Townsend (m. 1901; d. 1991)
- Children: 4
- Profession: Lawyer

Military service
- Allegiance: United States
- Branch/service: United States Army
- Battles/wars: World War I

Haskell L. Nichols was a Republican politician who served in both houses of the Michigan Legislature between 1933 and 1966.

A native of Homer, Nichols served in the U.S. Army during World War I. He served as the Jackson County circuit court commissioner before being elected to the Michigan House of Representatives in 1932. He was defeated in his bid for a third term in 1936 by Charles Snow, but won their rematch in 1938. In the interim (1937–38), he chaired the Jackson County Republican Party.

After two more terms in the House, Nichols won election to the Michigan Senate in 1942 where he served 12 terms. He was defeated in the Republican primary in 1966 by his eventual successor James Fleming.

Nichols was a Freemason and a member of numerous civic organizations, including Kiwanis, the Elks, the Shriners, the Jaycees, the Eagles, and the Moose. He died on April 30, 1991, aged 94.

In 1992, the Legislature named a portion of US-127 in Jackson County for Nichols.
