= Emil Lockwood =

American politician (1919–2002)

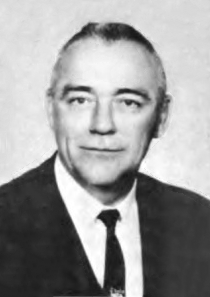

Majority Leader of the Michigan Senate
- In office 1967–1970
- Preceded by: Raymond D. Dzendzel
- Succeeded by: Robert VanderLaan

Member of the Michigan Senate from the 30th district
- In office January 1, 1963 – December 31, 1970
- Preceded by: John Stahlin
- Succeeded by: Bill Ballenger

Personal details
- Born: September 23, 1919 Ottawa, Illinois, U.S.
- Died: August 2, 2002 (aged 82) Ann Arbor, Michigan, U.S.
- Party: Republican
- Education: Kemper Military School (AA); University of Michigan (BA, MBA)

Military service
- Branch/service: United States Navy
- Battles/wars: World War II

Emil Lockwood (September 23, 1919 – August 2, 2002) was an American businessman and politician who represented Gratiot County in the Michigan Senate from 1963 to 1970, serving as the Senate Minority Leader from 1965 to 1966 and Senate Majority Leader from 1967 to 1970. As a young man, Lockwood served in the Pacific Theater in World War II, aboard a Landing Ship Tank.

== Early life and education ==
Lockwood was born in Ottawa, Illinois, and was a descendant of Franz Karl Achard on his mother's side. His namesake, Emil Achard, founded Saginaw Plate Glass Company in Saginaw, Michigan, where his family eventually moved. Lockwood earned an associate degree from Kemper Military School in Boonville, Missouri, followed by a Bachelor of Arts degree and Master of Business Administration from the University of Michigan. He served with distinction aboard an LST in the Pacific Theater of World War II.

== Career ==
After leaving the United States Navy, Lockwood taught amphibious warfare at Westminster College and accounting at Albion College. He then left academics and established a private accounting practice.

Lockwood began his career as a member of the Alma, Michigan Board of Education. He later served as a member of the Gratiot County, Michigan Board of Supervisors and was the president of the St. Louis, Michigan Rotary Club. Lockwood worked as a campaign manager for Detroit mayor Albert Cobo and Congressman R. James Harvey.

In 1963, Lockwood was elected to the Michigan Senate, representing Gratiot County, Clinton County, Shiawassee County, and portions of Montcalm County and Eaton County. He was re-elected in 1965 and selected to serve as Senate Minority Leader by members of the Michigan Senate Republican Caucus. He was re-elected again in 1967 and selected to serve as Senate Majority Leader after Republicans won the majority of senate seats.

Lockwood resigned as the state Senate majority leader in 1970 to launch an unsuccessful bid for Michigan Secretary of State. With F.J. Coomes in 1971, he co-founded Public Affairs Associates, the state's first multi-client bipartisan lobbying firm. Lockwood was later appointed chief lobbyist and deputy director of the Michigan Department of Commerce under Governor William Milliken.

== Personal life ==
In his later life, Lockwood retired to Duck Key, Florida. He died in Ann Arbor, Michigan in 2002.

== See also ==
- List of Michigan state legislatures

== Bibliography ==
- Man in Motion: Michigan's Legendary Senate Majority Leader, Emil Lockwood, by Stanley C. Fedewa and Marilyn H. Fedewa, Llumina, 2003, distributed by Michigan State University Press.
- The Political Graveyard by Lawrence Kestenbaum.

Party political offices
Preceded by George Washington	Republican nominee for Michigan Secretary of State; 1970	Succeeded by N. Lorraine Beebe
