= Stanley F. Rozycki =

American politician

Member of the Michigan Senate
- In office May 9, 1955 – December 31, 1974
- Preceded by: Cora Brown
- Succeeded by: Basil W. Brown
- Constituency: 2nd district (1955-1964); 3rd district (1965-1974)

Personal details
- Born: April 12, 1908 Detroit, Michigan, U.S.
- Died: December 3, 2002 (aged 94) North Fort Myers, Florida, U.S.
- Party: Democratic

Stanley F. Rozycki (April 12, 1908 – December 3, 2002) was a Democratic member of the Michigan Senate from 1955 through 1974.

Born in Detroit in 1908, Rozycki attended Wayne State University and the University of Detroit. He was owner and president of a family business, the Fireside Printing and Publishing Company. Rozycki won a special election to the Senate in 1955.

Rozycki was a delegate to the 1952 Democratic National Convention and an alternate in 1964.
