= Frank D. Beadle =

American politician

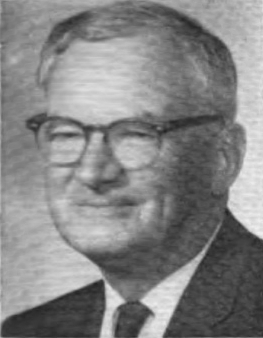

First Majority Leader of the Michigan Senate
- In office 1959–1962
- Succeeded by: Stanley G. Thayer

Member of the Michigan Senate
- In office 1951–1968
- Preceded by: Bruce F. Clothier
- Succeeded by: Alvin J. DeGrow
- Constituency: 11th district (1951–1954); 34th district (1955–1964); 28th district (1965–1968)

Personal details
- Born: Francis D. Beadle; February 16, 1899 Melvin, Michigan
- Died: June 2, 1983 (aged 84) East Grand Rapids, Michigan
- Party: Republican

Military service
- Allegiance: United States of America
- Branch/service: United States Marine Corps
- Battles/wars: World War I

Frank D. Beadle (February 16, 1899 – June 2, 1983) was a politician from Michigan who served as the first Majority Leader of the Michigan Senate.

Beadle was involved in the insurance and real estate business prior to his election to the Senate. During his tenure in the Senate, Beadle was a member of the Appropriations Committee.

== See also ==
- List of Michigan state legislatures
