= List of majority leaders of the Michigan Senate =

Majority Leader of the Michigan Senate
- Incumbent; Winnie Brinks since January 1, 2023
- Michigan Senate
- Formation: 1959
- First holder: Frank D. Beadle

The Majority Leader of the Michigan Senate is the leader of the majority party in the upper chamber of the Michigan Legislature. Elected by the members of the majority caucus, the majority leader has the authority under the rules of the Senate to name members to committees, refer legislation to committee, and perform other duties required by the rules or by state law.

Image	Senator	Party	Hometown	District	Session years
	Frank D. Beadle	Republican	St. Clair	34	1959–1962
	Stanley G. Thayer	Republican	Ann Arbor	33	1963–1964
	Raymond D. Dzendzel	Democratic	Detroit	7	1965–1966
	Emil Lockwood	Republican	St. Louis	30	1967–1970
	Robert VanderLaan	Republican	Kentwood	31	1970–1974
	Milton Zaagman	Republican	Grand Rapids	32	1974
	William B. Fitzgerald Jr.	Democratic	Detroit	1	1975-1976
	William Faust	Democratic	Westland	13	1976–1984
	John Engler	Republican	Mt. Pleasant	35	1984–1990
	Richard Posthumus	Republican	Alto	31	1991–1998
	Dan DeGrow	Republican	Port Huron	27	1999–2002
	Ken Sikkema	Republican	Grandville	28	2003–2006
	Mike Bishop	Republican	Rochester	12	2007–2010
	Randy Richardville	Republican	Monroe	17	2011–2014
	Arlan Meekhof	Republican	Ottawa	30	2015–2018
	Mike Shirkey	Republican	Jackson	16	2019–2022
	Winnie Brinks	Democratic	Grand Rapids	29	2023–2026

== See also ==
- List of speakers of the Michigan House of Representatives
- List of Michigan state legislatures
