= Michigan's 18th Senate district =

American legislative district

Michigan's 18th State Senate district
Senator
Thomas Albert; R–Lowell
- Demographics: 83.1% White; 4.5% Black; 4.9% Hispanic; 1.7% Asian; 0.3% Native American; 0.5% Other; 5.1% Multiracial
- Population (2024): 269,536

Michigan's 18th Senate district is one of 38 districts in the Michigan Senate. The 18th district was created by the 1850 Michigan Constitution, as the 1835 constitution only permitted a maximum of eight senate districts. It has been represented by Republican Thomas Albert since 2023, succeeding Democrat Jeff Irwin.

== Geography ==
District 18 encompasses all of Barry County, as well as parts of Allegan, Calhoun, Ionia, Kalamazoo, and Kent counties.

=== 2011 Apportionment Plan ===
District 18, as dictated by the 2011 Apportionment Plan, was based in the city of Ann Arbor – home to the University of Michigan – also covering the nearby Washtenaw County communities of Ypsilanti, Saline, Pittsfield Township, Ypsilanti Township, and Superior Township.

The district was largely located within Michigan's 12th congressional district, with a small portion extending into the 7th district. It overlapped with the 52nd, 53rd, 54th, and 55th districts of the Michigan House of Representatives.

== List of senators ==
Senator	Party	Dates	Residence	Notes
Jesse G. Beeson	Whig	1853–1854	Dowagiac	
James Sullivan	Democratic	1855–1856	Dowagiac	
Alexander H. Morrison	Republican	1857–1858	St. Joseph	
Franklin Muzzy	Democratic	1859–1860	Niles	
Elijah Lacey	Republican	1861–1862	Niles	Died in office.
Rufus W. Landon	Democratic	1863–1864	Niles	
Warren Chapman	Republican	1865–1868	St. Joseph	
Nathan H. Bitely	Republican	1867–1870	Lawton	
George Hannahs	Republican	1871–1872	South Haven	
James M. Goodell	Republican	1873–1874	Corunna	
Charles M. Wood	Democratic	1875–1876	Pinckney	
Elliot R. Wilcox	Democratic	1877–1878	Pontiac	
Peter Dow	Republican	1879–1882	Pontiac	
Joel W. McMahon	Republican	1883–1884	Marlette	
Carl Heisterman	Democratic	1885–1886	Bad Axe	
Chauncey W. Wisner	Democratic	1887–1891	East Saginaw	Resigned.
J. Milton Earl	Republican	1893–1896	Belding	
Edgar S. Wagar	Republican	1897–1900	Edmore	
George E. Nichols	Republican	1901–1902	Ionia	
Charles H. Laflamboy	Republican	1903–1904	McBride	
Walter Yeomans	Republican	1905–1908	Ionia	
William H. Bradley	Republican	1909–1912	Greenville	
Herbert E. Powell	Republican	1913–1916	Ionia	
George W. Miller	Republican	1917–1920	Greenville	
Foss O. Eldred	Republican	1921–1924	Ionia	
Charles R. Herrick	Republican	1925–1926	Fenwick	
Harold E. Stoll	Republican	1927–1928	Detroit	
Claude H. Stevens	Republican	1929–1932	Highland Park	
John W. Reid	Republican	1933–1936	Highland Park	
Thomas Burke	Democratic	1937–1938	Detroit	
Clyde V. Fenner	Republican	1939–1940	Highland Park	
Clarence A. Reid	Republican	1941–1948	Detroit	
James P. Hannan	Democratic	1949–1950	Detroit	
Clarence A. Reid	Republican	1951–1952	Detroit	
Allen H. Blondy	Democratic	1953–1954	Detroit	
John B. Swainson	Democratic	1955–1958	Detroit	
Raymond D. Dzendzel	Democratic	1959–1964	Detroit	
Gilbert E. Bursley	Republican	1965–1978	Ann Arbor	
Edward C. Pierce	Democratic	1979–1982	Ann Arbor	
Lana Pollack	Democratic	1983–1994	Ann Arbor	
Alma Wheeler Smith	Democratic	1995–2002	Salem Township	Also resided in South Lyon.
Elizabeth Brater	Democratic	2003–2010	Ann Arbor	
Rebekah Warren	Democratic	2011–2018	Ann Arbor	
Jeff Irwin	Democratic	2019–2022	Ann Arbor	
Thomas Albert	Republican	2023–present	Lowell	

== Recent election results ==
=== 2020s ===
2026 Michigan Senate election
Primary election
Party	Candidate	Votes	%
Republican	Thomas A. Albert (incumbent)	28,587	100
Total votes		28,587	100
Democratic	Anthony Pennock	25,671	100
Total votes		25,671	100
General election
Republican	Thomas A. Albert (incumbent)	71,129	58.31
Democratic	Anthony Pennock	50,846	41.69
Total votes		121,975	100
Republican hold			

2022 Michigan Senate election, District 18
Primary election
Party	Candidate	Votes	%
Republican	Thomas A. Albert	25,181	69.8
Republican	Ryan P. Mancinelli	10,912	30.2
Total votes		36,093	100
General election
Republican	Thomas A. Albert	72,027	62.0
Democratic	Kai W. De Graaf	44,223	38.0
Total votes		116,250	100
Republican gain from Democratic			

=== 2018 ===
2018 Michigan Senate election, District 18
Primary election
Party	Candidate	Votes	%
Democratic	Jeff Irwin	19,875	35.6
Democratic	Michelle Deatrick	19,634	35.2
Democratic	Anuja Rajendra	14,673	26.3
Democratic	Matthew Miller	1,597	2.9
Total votes		55,779	100
General election
Democratic	Jeff Irwin	96,891	76.6
Republican	Martin Church	26,620	21.0
Working Class	Thomas Repasky	2,954	2.3
Total votes		126,465	100
Democratic hold			

=== 2014 ===
2014 Michigan Senate election, District 18
Party	Candidate	Votes	%
Democratic	Rebekah Warren (incumbent)	61,421	72.1
Republican	Terry Linden	23,745	27.9
Total votes		85,166	100
Democratic hold			

=== Federal and statewide results ===
Year	Office	Results
2020	President	Biden 77.2 – 21.5%
2018	Senate	Stabenow 75.6 – 22.9%
2018	Governor	Whitmer 76.4 – 21.4%
2016	President	Clinton 73.2 – 22.2%
2014	Senate	Peters 71.9 – 24.9%
2014	Governor	Schauer 61.6 – 36.5%
2012	President	Obama 72.2 – 26.7%
2012	Senate	Stabenow 73.1 – 23.5%

== Historical district boundaries ==
Map	Description	Apportionment Plan	Notes
	Lenawee County (part); Blissfield Township; Clinton Township; Deerfield Township; Fairfield Township; Macon Township; Madison Township; Ogden Township; Palmyra Township; Raisin Township; Ridgeway Township; Riga Township; Tecumseh; Tecumseh Township; Washtenaw County	1964 Apportionment Plan	
	Jackson County (part); Waterloo Township; Lenawee County (part); Clinton Township; Tecumseh Township; Livingston County (part); Brighton; Green Oak Township; Hamburg Township; Howell; Howell Township; Iosco Township; Marion Township; Putnam Township; Unadilla Township; Washtenaw County (part); Ann Arbor; Ann Arbor Township; Augusta Township; Bridgewater Township; Dexter Township; Freedom Township; Lima Township; Lodi Township; Lyndon Township; Northfield Township; Pittsfield Township; Salem Township; Saline; Saline Township; Scio Township; Superior Township; Sylvan Township; Webster Township; York Township; Ypsilanti; Ypsilanti Township (part)	1972 Apportionment Plan	
	Washtenaw County (part); Ann Arbor; Ann Arbor Township; Augusta Township; Bridgewater Township; Dexter Township; Freedom Township; Lima Township; Lodi Township; Lyndon Township; Manchester Township; Milan; Northfield Township; Pittsfield Township; Salem Township; Saline; Scio Township; Sharon Township; Superior Township; Sylvan Township; Webster Township; York Township; Ypsilanti; Ypsilanti Township	1982 Apportionment Plan	
	Washtenaw County (part); Ann Arbor; Ann Arbor Township; Bridgewater Township; Dexter Township; Freedom Township; Lima Township; Lodi Township; Lyndon Township; Manchester Township; Northfield Township; Pittsfield Township; Salem Township; Saline Township; Scio Township; Sharon Township; Superior Township; Sylvan Township; Webster Township; Ypsilanti; Ypsilanti Township	1992 Apportionment Plan	
	Washtenaw County (part); Ann Arbor; Ann Arbor Township; Augusta Township; Dexter Township; Freedom Township; Lima Township; Lyndon Township; Northfield Township; Pittsfield Township (part); Salem Township; Scio Township; Sharon Township; Superior Township; Sylvan Township; Webster Township; Ypsilanti; Ypsilanti Township	2001 Apportionment Plan	
	Washtenaw County (part); Ann Arbor (part); Ann Arbor Township; Augusta Township; Lodi Township (part); Milan; Pittsfield Township; Salem Township; Saline; Saline Township (part); Scio Township (part); Superior Township; York Township; Ypsilanti; Ypsilanti Township	2011 Apportionment Plan	
