= Michigan's 8th Senate district =

American legislative district

Michigan's 8th State Senate district
Senator
Mallory McMorrow; D–Royal Oak
- Demographics: 48.5% White; 41.3% Black; 3% Hispanic; 2.2% Asian; 0.1% Native American; 0.8% Other; 4.1% Multiracial
- Population (2024): 259,113

Michigan's 8th Senate district is one of 38 districts in the Michigan Senate. The current senator for the district is Mallory McMorrow of Royal Oak.

== Geography ==
District 8 encompasses parts of Oakland and Wayne counties.

=== 2011 Apportionment Plan ===
District 8, as dictated by the 2011 Apportionment Plan, was based in northern and coastal Macomb County to the north of Detroit, including the communities of St. Clair Shores, Harrison Township, Mount Clemens, Chesterfield Township, New Baltimore, Lenox Township, New Haven, Ray Township, Utica, Shelby Township, Washington Township, Romeo, and Bruce Township.

The district overlapped with Michigan's 9th and 10th congressional districts, and with the 18th, 24th, 30th, 31st, 32nd, 33rd, and 36th districts of the Michigan House of Representatives.

== List of senators ==
Senator	Party	Dates	Residence	Notes
Alexander M. Arzeno	Democratic	1853–1854	Newport	
William H. Montgomery	Democratic	1855–1856	Ida	
William H. Pattison	Republican	1857–1858	Saline	
Chester L. Yost	Republican	1859–1860	Ypsilanti	
Nathan Webb	Republican	1861–1862	Ypsilanti	
John J. Robison	Democratic	1863–1864	Manchester	Elected on a Fusionist ticket.
J. Webster Childs	Republican	1865–1866	Ypsilanti	
Charles Croswell	Republican	1867–1868	Adrian	
John K. Boies	Republican	1869–1870	Hudson	
James P. Cawley	Republican	1871–1872	Morenci	
Philip H. Emerson	Republican	1873	Battle Creek	Resigned to become Associate Justice of the Supreme Court of Utah.
Willson F. Hewitt	Republican	1874	Marshall	
William Cook	Republican	1875–1878	Homer	
John C. Patterson	Republican	1879–1882	Marshall	
Charles Austin	Republican	1883–1886	Battle Creek	
Warren J. Willits	Republican	1887–1888	Three Rivers	
Peyton Ranney	Republican	1889–1890	Kalamazoo	
Marden Sabin	Republican	1891–1892	Centreville	
Jan W. Garvelink	Republican	1893–1894	Allegan County	
George W. Merriman	Republican	1895–1898	Hartford	
James W. Humphrey	Republican	1899–1902	Wayland	
Jason Woodman	Republican	1903–1906	Paw Paw	
Erastus N. Bates	Republican	1907–1910	Moline	
Milan D. Wiggins	Republican	1911–1914	Bloomingdale	Died in office.
Burrell Tripp	Republican	1915–1918	Allegan	
Bayard G. Davis	Republican	1919–1922	Lawton	
George Leland	Republican	1923–1934	Fennville	Died in office.
Frank R. Mosier	Republican	1935–1936	Fennville	
Earl L. Burhans	Republican	1937–1942	Paw Paw	
Harold D. Tripp	Republican	1943–1950	Allegan	
J. Edward Hutchinson	Republican	1951–1960	Fennville	
Frederic Hilbert	Republican	1961–1964	Wayland	
Michael J. O'Brien	Democratic	1965–1974	Detroit	Died in office.
Michael J. O'Brien Jr.	Democratic	1974	Detroit	
Donald E. Bishop	Republican	1975–1982	Rochester	
Philip Mastin	Democratic	1983	Pontiac	Recalled.
Rudy J. Nichols	Republican	1984–1990	Waterford	
Mat J. Dunaskiss	Republican	1991–1994	Lake Orion	
Loren N. Bennett	Republican	1995–2002	Canton	
Raymond E. Basham	Democratic	2003–2010	Taylor	
Hoon-Yung Hopgood	Democratic	2011–2014	Taylor	
Jack Brandenburg	Republican	2015–2018	Harrison Township	
Peter Lucido	Republican	2019–2020	Shelby Township	Resigned after elected Macomb County prosecutor.
Doug Wozniak	Republican	2021–2022	Shelby Township	
Mallory McMorrow	Democratic	2023–present	Royal Oak	
Dayna Polehanki	Democratic	(Note: Member-elect.)		

== Recent election results ==
=== 2020s ===
2026 Michigan Senate election
Primary election
Party	Candidate	Votes	%
Democratic	Dayna Polehanki	46,011	100
Total votes		46,011	100
Republican	Kenneth D. Massey	22,002	100
Total votes		22,002	100
General election
Democratic	Dayna Polehanki	84,917	60.01
Republican	Kenneth D. Massey	56,584	39.99
Total votes		141,501	100
Democratic hold			

2022 Michigan Senate election, District 8
Primary election
Party	Candidate	Votes	%
Democratic	Mallory McMorrow (incumbent)	32,738	68.5
Democratic	Marshall Bullock (incumbent)	15,093	31.5
Total votes		47,831	100
General election
Democratic	Mallory McMorrow (incumbent)	94,878	78.9
Republican	Brandon Ronald Simpson	25,309	21.1
Total votes		120,187	100
Democratic gain from Republican			

=== 2021 ===
2021 Michigan Senate special election, District 8
Primary election
Party	Candidate	Votes	%
Democratic	Martin Robert	9,562	70.5
Democratic	John Bill	3,999	29.5
Total votes		13,561	100.0
Republican	Douglas Wozniak	9,510	35.7
Republican	Pamela Hornberger	7,861	29.5
Republican	Terence Mekoski	5,553	20.8
Republican	Mary Berlingieri	2,050	7.7
Republican	Kristi Dean	666	2.5
Republican	Bill Carver	645	2.4
Republican	Grant Golasa	372	1.4
Total votes		26,657	100.0
General election
Republican	Douglas Wozniak	30,555	61.9
Democratic	Martin Robert	18,838	38.1
Total votes		49,393	100.0

=== 2018 ===
2018 Michigan Senate election, District 8
Primary election
Party	Candidate	Votes	%
Republican	Peter Lucido	24,261	71.7
Republican	Ken Goike	9,565	28.3
Total votes		33,826	100
Democratic	Paul Francis	10,113	46.6
Democratic	Patrick Biange	6,612	30.5
Democratic	Raymond Filipek	4,989	23.0
Total votes		21,714	100
General election
Republican	Peter Lucido	76,172	61.8
Democratic	Paul Francis	47,154	38.2
Total votes		123,326	100
Republican hold			

=== 2014 ===
2014 Michigan Senate election, District 8
Party	Candidate	Votes	%
Republican	Jack Brandenburg (incumbent)	55,304	61.7
Democratic	Christine Bell	34,279	38.3
Total votes		89,583	100
Republican hold			

=== Federal and statewide results ===
Year	Office	Results
2020	President	Trump 59.1 – 39.5%
2018	Senate	James 54.2 – 44.3%
2018	Governor	Schuette 52.9 – 44.6%
2016	President	Trump 59.7 – 35.9%
2014	Senate	Peters 48.6 – 46.7%
2014	Governor	Snyder 59.6 – 38.4%
2012	President	Romney 53.5 – 45.6%
2012	Senate	Stabenow 54.4 – 42.3%

== Historical district boundaries ==
Map	Description	Apportionment Plan	Notes
	Wayne County (part); Detroit (part)	1964 Apportionment Plan	
	Oakland County (part); Addison Township; Avon Township; Birmingham; Bloomfield Hills; Bloomfield Township; Brandon Township; Oakland Township; Orchard Lake; Orion Township; Oxford Township; Pontiac Township; Rochester; Southfield Township; Troy (part); West Bloomfield Township	1972 Apportionment Plan	
	Oakland County (part); Addison Township; Avon Township; Keego Harbor; Pontiac; Pontiac Township; Oakland Township; Orion Township; Oxford Township; Rochester; Waterford Township	1982 Apportionment Plan	
	Wayne County (part); Belleville; Brownstown Township; Canton Township (part); Rock; Huron Township; Rockwood; Romulus; Sumpter Township; Van Buren Township; Wayne; Westland; Woodhaven	1992 Apportionment Plan	
	Wayne County (part); Allen Park; Ecorse; Lincoln Park; Melvindale; Riverview; Romulus; Southgate; Taylor; Wayne; Wyandotte	2001 Apportionment Plan	
	Macomb County (part); Bruce Township; Chesterfield Township; Grosse Pointe Shores; Harrison Township; Lenox Township; Mount Clemens; Ray Township; St. Clair Shores; Shelby Township; Utica; Washington Township	2011 Apportionment Plan	
