= Raymond D. Dzendzel =

American politician (1921–2018)

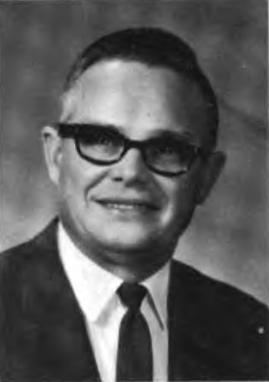

3rd Majority Leader of the Michigan Senate
- In office 1965–1966
- Preceded by: Stanley G. Thayer
- Succeeded by: Emil Lockwood

Member of the Michigan Senate
- In office January 1, 1959 – December 31, 1970
- Preceded by: John B. Swainson
- Succeeded by: Jack Faxon
- Constituency: 18th district (1959–1964); 7th district (1865–1970)

Member of the Michigan House of Representatives from the Wayne County 12th district
- In office January 1, 1955 – December 31, 1958

Personal details
- Born: July 29, 1921 Port Clinton, Ohio
- Died: May 1, 2018 (aged 96)
- Party: Democratic
- Spouse: Eleanor

Military service
- Allegiance: United States
- Battles/wars: World War II

Raymond D. Dzendzel (July 29, 1921 – May 1, 2018) was an American politician who was a Democratic member of both houses of the Michigan Legislature between 1955 and 1970.

A native of Ohio, Dzendzel's family moved to Southfield, Michigan, in the early 1930s and he graduated from Redford High School and the Detroit Institute of Technology. He enlisted in the United States Coast Guard and served on the USS Peoria during World War II. Dzendzel was business representative with Carpenters Local 982.

In 1954, he sought and won election to the Michigan House of Representatives, serving two terms. He won election to the Michigan Senate in 1958, serving five terms. Dzendzel was Majority Leader in 1965-1966, but became Minority Leader when the Democrats lost control of the Senate in the 1966 election. Endorsed by the AFL–CIO, he lost to then-Representative Jack Faxon, who had been endorsed by the UAW, in the Democratic primary in 1970.

After leaving the Legislature, Dzendzel was a member of the board of Botsford Hospital for 30 years.

Dzendzel died on May 1, 2018, at the age of 96.
