= Basil W. Brown =

American politician (1927–1997)

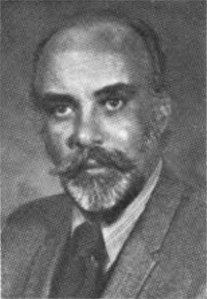

Member of the Michigan Senate
- In office January 1, 1957 – 1988
- Preceded by: Cora Brown
- Succeeded by: Virgil C. Smith
- Constituency: 3rd district (1957–1964); 6th district (1965–1974); 3rd district (1975–1982); 2nd district (1983–1988)

Personal details
- Born: March 20, 1927 Vandalia, Michigan, U.S.
- Died: October 30, 1997 (aged 70) Highland Park, Michigan, U.S.
- Party: Democratic

Basil W. Brown (March 20, 1927 – October 30, 1997) was an American politician and lawyer.

Born in Vandalia, Michigan, Brown moved with his family to Battle Creek, Michigan. Brown graduated from Battle Creek Central High School. He served in the United States Navy during World War II. Brown then received his bachelor's degree Western Michigan University and his law degree from University of Michigan Law School. He practiced law. From 1957 to 1988, Brown served in the Michigan State Senate and was a Democrat.

Brown resigned from the Michigan Senate in 1988 when he was arrested on drug-related charges. The Michigan Supreme Court later reversed the drug-related conviction due to entrapment concerns and the charges were later dropped.

Brown died as a result of a fire at his home in Highland Park, Michigan and was treated for cancer.
