= Doug Geiss =

American politician

Douglas A. Geiss

Member of the Michigan House of Representatives
- In office January 1, 2009 – December 31, 2014
- Preceded by: Hoon-Yung Hopgood
- Succeeded by: Erika Geiss
- Constituency: 22nd district (2009–2012); 12th district (2013–2014)

Member of the Taylor City Council
- In office 2001–2008

Personal details
- Born: December 29, 1969 (age 56) Royal Oak, Michigan, U.S.
- Party: Democratic
- Spouse: Erika Geiss
- Children: 2
- Education: University of Michigan
- Occupation: Politician

Doug Geiss (born December 29, 1969) is an American politician from Michigan. Geiss is a former Democratic member of Michigan House of Representatives.

== Education ==
In 1992, Geiss earned a Bachelor of Science degree in Engineering from University of Michigan. In 2000, Geiss earned an MBA from University of Michigan.

== Career ==
In 2001, Geiss served the city council in Taylor, Michigan. In 2008, Geiss became a member of Michigan House of Representatives.

In January 2013, Geiss, together with Rep. Dian Slavens, became the first Members to vote against the election or re-election of the Speaker of the House since the 1960s when he voted against the re-election of Jase Bolger to serve as Speaker for the 97th Legislature.

== Personal life ==
Geiss's wife is Erika Geiss. They have two children.

== External life ==
- 2011-2012 Michigan Manual: State Representative Douglas A. Geiss

Michigan House of Representatives
Preceded by Hoon-Yung Hopgood	Member of the Michigan House of Representatives from the 22nd district 2009–2013	Succeeded by Harold Haugh
Preceded by Rashida Tlaib	Member of the Michigan House of Representatives from the 12th district 2013–2015	Succeeded by Erika Geiss
