= Richard Steenland =

American politician

Member of the Michigan House of Representatives from the 22nd district
- In office January 1, 2021 – January 1, 2023
- Preceded by: John Chirkun

Personal details
- Born: 1961 or 1962 (age 63–64) Roseville, Michigan
- Party: Democratic
- Education: Macomb Community College; Oakland University
- Website: Rich Steenland

Richard M. Steenland (born 1961 or 1962) is an American politician who served as a member of the Michigan House of Representatives from the 22nd district. Elected in 2020, he assumed office on January 1, 2021.

He lost renomination in 2022.

== Early life and education ==
Steenland was born around 1962 in Roseville, Michigan. In 1979, Steenland graduated from Carl Brablec High School. In 1992, he earned an associate degree from Macomb Community College. He also graduated from Oakland University, where he majored in human resources.

== Career ==
Steenland has worked for Macomb County, Michigan in a number of positions since 1983, including as in the juvenile court, a judicial aide in the Friend of the Court and the Court Administrator's Office, and as in the tax collection department of the Macomb County Treasurer's Office. Steenland served on the Roseville City Council from 1993 to 2007. Steenland served as Roseville City Clerk from 2007 until his resignation in 2020. On November 3, 2020, Steenland was elected to the Michigan House of Representatives, where he has represented the 22nd district since January 1, 2021.

== Personal life ==
Richard Steenland was married to Judge Catherine Steenland. The couple had three children together. They divorced in 2017. Richard has served with the Knights of Columbus. Richard is Catholic.
