= John Chirkun =

American politician from Michigan

Member of the Michigan House of Representatives from the 22nd district
- In office January 1, 2015 – January 1, 2021
- Preceded by: Harold Haugh
- Succeeded by: Richard Steenland

Mayor of Roseville
- In office January 13, 2009 – 2014
- Preceded by: Harold Haugh
- Succeeded by: Robert R. Taylor

Roseville City Council
- In office 1995 – January 2009

Personal details
- Born: Roseville, Michigan
- Party: Democratic
- Spouse: Sharon Chirkun
- Occupation: Politician
- Website: Official website

John G. Chirkun is a Democratic politician from Michigan currently representing the 22nd District—which includes the city of Roseville and part of the city of Warren—in the Michigan House of Representatives after being elected in November 2014.

== Personal life ==
Chirkun was born in Roseville, Michigan. He is married to Sharon Chirkun, has two children, one foster child, and two grandchildren. Chirkun is a Methodist and a member of Ducks Unlimited, the Friends of the Roseville Public Library, Nautical Mile Handicapped Fishing Derby, the Richmond Sportsmen’s Club, Roseville Good Fellows, Roseville Historical & Genealogical Society, Roseville Optimist Club, and Wayne County Police Lieutenants and Sergeants Association. He attended Macomb Community College.

== Professional life ==
Chirkun worked for the Wayne County Sheriff for 29 years, retiring in 2004 as commanding officer of the Sheriff’s Internet Crimes Unit and Special Operations with the rank of executive sergeant. While working for the Sheriff's department, he served as Sheriff’s Union vice-president of the Service Employees International Union.

He has also served as vice president of operations for Michigan Tether since 2007.

=== City of Roseville ===
Chirkun was elected to the Roseville City Council in November 1995 and served until 2009, when he was appointed mayor. In 2005, he was appointed to the Roseville Retirement Board, and he was elected chairman in February 2009. In November 2005, he was appointed to the South Macomb Sanitary District, and the South Macomb Disposal Authority where he served as chairman.

On January 13, 2009 he was appointed Mayor of the City of Roseville by the Roseville City Council.

=== Michigan House of Representatives ===
In November 2014, Chirkun was elected to a two-year term, beginning January 2015, representing the 22nd District in the Michigan House of Representatives. In the House, he serves on the House Committees on Communications and Technology, Financial Liability Reform, and Regulatory Reform.
