= Raymond E. Basham =

American politician

Member of the Wayne County Commission from the 14th district
- In office January 1, 2011 – December 2024
- Preceded by: Edward A. Boike, Jr.
- Succeeded by: Alex Garza

Member of the Michigan Senate from the 8th district
- In office January 1, 2003 – December 31, 2010
- Preceded by: Loren Bennett
- Succeeded by: Hoon-Yung Hopgood

Member of the Michigan House of Representatives from the 22nd district
- In office June 18, 1997 – December 31, 2002
- Preceded by: Greg Pitoniak
- Succeeded by: Hoon-Yung Hopgood

Personal details
- Born: May 24, 1945 (age 81) Roanoke, Virginia
- Party: Democratic
- Spouse: Iva
- Profession: Organized labor

Raymond E. Basham (born May 24, 1945) is an American politician from the state of Michigan. He was a Democratic member of the Michigan Senate, representing the 8th District from 2003 to 2009. His district was located in central Wayne County. Previously he was a member of the Michigan House of Representatives from 1997 to 2002. He currently serves as a member of the Wayne County Commission.

== Career ==
Basham served in the U.S. Air Force from 1962 to 1966.

From 1969 to 1997, he was employed by the Ford Motor Company. During his tenure, he was appointed as an Employee Support Services Representative for the United Auto Workers (UAW) Local 245. He also served on various UAW committees, including the bargaining committee and education committee.

Basham served as an Auxiliary Police Officer from 1979 to 1984.

Basham was appointed to the Taylor Water Commission in 1984, and served until 1985. Basham was elected as the Constable in Taylor, and served from 1987 to 1989. He was elected to the Taylor City Council in 1989, and served until 1997.

On June 17, 1997, Basham won a special election and became a member of Michigan House of Representatives. Basham was re-election in 1998 and 2000.

Basham was elected to serve in the Michigan State Senate in 2002, and won re-election in 2006. He was then elected to the Wayne County Commission in 2010 and re-elected in 2012.

== Legislative Issues ==
It was while Basham was working at Ford Motor Company that he first became aware of the issue of second-hand smoke. It was also while he was at Ford that Basham became directly involved with smoking and second-hand smoke as an employee support services representative for the United Auto Workers (UAW) Local 245.

"I was involved in smoking cessation and other programs with the UAW," he said. "I had numerous complaints of second-hand smoke, and we dealt with them on a case-by-case basis."

During Basham's service on the Taylor City Council and Planning Commission, he noticed smoking during meetings and people ignoring no smoking signs, and smoking was even allowed in the state Capitol. Mounting evidence, such as food service workers are 50 percent more likely than the general population to develop lung cancer and the Environmental Protection Agency (EPA) classified second-hand smoke as a Group A carcinogen, drove Basham to action.

"I had colleagues that would not come into the caucus room because they had ash trays on the chairs," he said.

Basham has championed smoke-free legislation since he was first elected to the Michigan House of Representatives in 1997, and has continued that quest in the Senate.

== Electoral history ==
- 2006 election for Michigan State Senate - Michigan 8th District

Name	Percent
Raymond E. Basham (D)	70.9%
Fred Kalsic (R)	26.4%
Loel Gnadt (L)	2.7%

- 2002 election for Michigan State Senate - Michigan 8th District

Name	Percent
Raymond E. Basham (D)	64.2%
Pamela S. Montelauro (R)	32.4%

== Personal life ==
Basham's wife is Iva Basham. They have two children. Basham and his family lived in Taylor, Michigan.
