= Michigan's 6th Senate district =

American legislative district

Michigan's 6th State Senate district
Senator
| Mary Cavanagh; D–Redford Township |
- Demographics: 45% White; 41.2% Black; 3.3% Hispanic; 5.1% Asian; 0.2% Native American; 0.1% Hawaiian/Pacific Islander; 0.6% Other; 4.5% Multiracial
- Population (2024): 256,691

Michigan's 6th Senate district is one of 38 districts in the Michigan Senate. It has been represented by Democrat Mary Cavanagh since 2023, succeeding fellow Democrat Erika Geiss.

== Geography ==
District 6 encompasses parts of Oakland and Wayne counties.

=== 2011 Apportionment Plan ===
District 6, as dictated by the 2011 Apportionment Plan, covered much of Downriver to the southwest of Detroit in Wayne County, including the suburban communities of Westland, Taylor, Romulus, Rockwood, Flat Rock, Huron, Sumpter, Van Buren, Belleville, and most of Brownstown.

The district was split between Michigan's 12th and 13th congressional districts, and with the 11th, 12th, 16th, 17th, 21st, and 23rd districts of the Michigan House of Representatives.

== List of senators ==
| Senator | Party | Dates | Residence | Notes |
|---|---|---|---|---|
| James Wright Gordon | Whig | 1839 | Marshall | |
| Sands McCamly | Democratic | 1839–1840 | Battle Creek | |
| Henry P. Bridge | Democratic | 1840–1841 | Kent | |
| David E. Deming | Whig | 1841 | Kalamazoo | |
| Stephen V. R. Trowbridge | Whig | 1842 | Birmingham | |
| Daniel B. Wakefield | Democratic | 1842–1843 | Grand Blanc | |
| Isaac Wixom | Democratic | 1842–1843 | Farmington | |
| Sanford M. Green | Democratic | 1843–1844 | Pontiac | Moved from Owosso to Pontiac in 1843. |
| Johnson Niles | Democratic | 1844–1845 | Troy | |
| Alvin N. Hart | Democratic | 1844–1845 | Lapeer | |
| Gardner D. Williams | Democratic | 1845–1846 | Saginaw | |
| Sanford M. Green | Democratic | 1846–1847 | Pontiac | |
| William M. Fenton | Democratic | 1846–1847 | Flint | Resided in Fentonville in 1846. |
| Elijah B. Witherbee | Whig | 1847 | Flint | Died in office. |
| Andrew Parsons | Democratic | 1847–1848 | Corunna | |
| Alvin N. Hart | Democratic | 1847–1850 | Lapeer | Initially elected to fill the vacancy left by Elijah B. Witherbee's death. |
| James McCabe | Democratic | 1848–1849 | Pontiac | |
| Edward H. Thomson | Democratic | 1848–1849 | Flint | |
| Johnathan P. King | Democratic | 1849–1850 | Mackinac County | |
| Thorton F. Brodhead | Democratic | 1850 | Pontiac | |
| Noah Beach | Democratic | 1850–1852 | Bridegeport | |
| Elijah J. Roberts | Democratic | 1851 | Eagle River | Died in office. |
| Samuel Axford | Democratic | 1851–1852 | Oxford | |
| John P. LeRoy | Whig | 1851–1852 | Pontiac | |
The 1850 Michigan Constitution takes effect, changing the district from a multi-member district to a single-member district.
| Henry Hall | Democratic | 1853–1854 | Dexter | |
| Charles Tripp | Republican | 1855–1856 | Ann Arbor | |
| Willard B. Arms | Republican | 1857–1858 | White Lake | |
| James M. Hoyt | Democratic | 1859–1860 | Walled Lake | |
| John G. Owen | Republican | 1861–1862 | Clarkston | |
| Peter Dow | Republican | 1863–1864 | Pontiac | |
| John G. Crawford | Republican | 1865–1866 | Holly | |
| James Webster Childs | Republican | 1867–1868 | Ypsilanti | |
| Lyman D. Norris | Democratic | 1869–1870 | Ypsilanti | |
| Emanuel Mann | Republican | 1871–1872 | Ann Arbor | |
| Charles E. Mickley | Republican | 1873–1874 | Fairfield Township | |
| John K. Boies | Republican | 1875–1876 | Hudson | |
| Roland B. C. Newcomb | Republican | 1877–1878 | Blissfield | |
| Richard B. Robbins | Republican | 1879–1880 | Adrian | |
| Brackley Shaw | Republican | 1881–1884 | Clayton | |
| Manson Carpenter | Republican | 1885–1886 | Lenawee County | |
| John C. Sharp | Republican | 1887–1888 | Jackson | |
| Adelbert R. Chapman | Republican | 1889–1890 | Reading | |
| William H. Withington | Republican | 1891–1892 | Jackson | |
| Marden Sabin | Republican | 1893–1894 | Centreville | |
| Oscar A. Janes | Republican | 1895–1896 | Hillsdale | |
| Edward E. Bostwick | Democratic | 1897–1898 | Union City | Elected on a Democratic, Populist, and Silverite fusion ticket. |
| Frank A. Lyon | Republican | 1899–1900 | Hillsdale | |
| William H. Lockerby | Republican | 1901–1904 | Quincy | |
| Edward B. Linsley | Republican | 1905–1908 | Three Rivers | |
| Walter R. Taylor | Republican | 1909–1912 | Kalamazoo | |
| William C. Grace | Democratic | 1913–1914 | Kalamazoo | |
| Walter R. Taylor | Republican | 1915–1916 | Kalamazoo | |
| Frank L. Willison | Democratic | 1917–1918 | Climax | |
| J. Mark Harvey | Republican | 1919–1920 | Constantine | |
| Donald C. Osborn | Republican | 1921–1924 | Kalamazoo | |
| Frank S. Cummings | Republican | 1925–1928 | Centreville | |
| James T. Upjohn | Republican | 1929–1934 | Kalamazoo | |
| Miller Dunckel | Republican | 1935–1938 | Three Rivers | |
| Carl F. DeLano | Republican | 1939–1945 | Kalamazoo | Resigned. |
| John W. Fletcher | Republican | 1945–1948 | Centreville | |
| Carlton H. Morris | Republican | 1949–1962 | Kalamazoo | |
| Garry E. Brown | Republican | 1963–1964 | Schoolcraft | |
| Basil W. Brown | Democratic | 1965–1974 | Detroit | |
| Michael J. O'Brien Jr. | Democratic | 1975–1982 | Detroit | |
| R. Robert Geake | Republican | 1983–1994 | Northville | |
| George Z. Hart | Democratic | 1995–2002 | Dearborn | |
| Laura M. Toy | Republican | 2003–2006 | Livonia | |
| Glenn S. Anderson | Democratic | 2007–2014 | Westland | |
| Hoon-Yung Hopgood | Democratic | 2015–2018 | Taylor | |
| Erika Geiss | Democratic | 2019–2022 | Taylor | |
| Mary Cavanagh | Democratic | 2023–present | Redford Township | |

== Recent election results ==
=== 2020s ===
2026 Michigan Senate election
Primary election
| Party | Candidate | Votes | % |
|---|---|---|---|
| Democratic | Mary Cavanagh (incumbent) | 37,383 | 85.7 |
| Democratic | Stephen Jensen | 6,240 | 14.3 |
| Total votes | | 43,623 | 100 |
| Republican | Joi Pokerwinski | 2,278 | 100 |
| Total votes | | 2,278 | 100 |
General election
| Democratic | Mary Cavanagh (incumbent) | 91,688 | 92.81 |
| Republican | Joi Pokerwinski | 7,099 | 7.19 |
| Total votes | | 98,787 | 100 |
| Democratic hold | | | |

2022 Michigan Senate election, District 6
Primary election
| Party | Candidate | Votes | % |
|---|---|---|---|
| Democratic | Mary Cavanagh | 14,908 | 43.9 |
| Democratic | Vicki Barnett | 12,158 | 35.8 |
| Democratic | Darryl D. Brown | 6,865 | 20.2 |
| Write-in Candidate | Betty Jean Alexander | 8 | 0.02 |
| Total votes | | 33,939 | 100 |
General election
| Democratic | Mary Cavanagh | 74,122 | 68.0 |
| Republican | Ken Crider | 31,463 | 28.9 |
| Working Class | Kimberly Givens | 3,396 | 3.1 |
| Total votes | | 108,981 | 100 |
| Democratic hold | | | |

=== 2018 ===
2018 Michigan Senate election, District 6
Primary election
| Party | Candidate | Votes | % |
|---|---|---|---|
| Democratic | Erika Geiss | 19,596 | 65.4 |
| Democratic | Robert Kosowski | 10,359 | 34.6 |
| Total votes | | 29,955 | 100 |
General election
| Democratic | Erika Geiss | 60,789 | 61.3 |
| Republican | Brenda Jones | 38,301 | 38.7 |
| Total votes | | 99,090 | 100 |
| Democratic hold | | | |

=== 2014 ===
2014 Michigan Senate election, District 6
| Party | Candidate | Votes | % |
|---|---|---|---|
| Democratic | Hoon-Yung Hopgood (incumbent) | 42,835 | 62.3 |
| Republican | Darrell McNeill | 25,919 | 37.7 |
| Total votes | | 68,754 | 100 |
| Democratic hold | | | |

=== Federal and statewide results ===
| Year | Office | Results |
|---|---|---|
| 2020 | President | Biden 55.2 – 43.3% |
| 2018 | Senate | Stabenow 59.7 – 38.1% |
| 2018 | Governor | Whitmer 60.9 – 36.0% |
| 2016 | President | Clinton 53.2 – 42.2% |
| 2014 | Senate | Peters 64.6 – 30.4% |
| 2014 | Governor | Schauer 57.3 – 40.3% |
| 2012 | President | Obama 64.3 – 34.8% |
| 2012 | Senate | Stabenow 69.6 – 26.7% |

== Historical district boundaries ==
| Map | Description | Apportionment Plan | Notes |
|---|---|---|---|
| | Wayne County (part); Detroit (part); Highland Park | 1964 Apportionment Plan | |
| | Wayne County (part); Detroit (part) | 1972 Apportionment Plan | |
| | Wayne County (part); Canton Township; Livonia; Northville; Northville Township; Plymouth; Plymouth Township; Redford Township | 1982 Apportionment Plan | |
| | Wayne County (part); Allen Park; Dearborn; Dearborn Heights; Garden City; Inkster | 1992 Apportionment Plan | |
| | Wayne County (part); Garden City; Livonia; Redford Township; Westland | 2001 Apportionment Plan | |
| | Wayne County (part); Belleville; Brownstown Township (part); Flat Rock; Huron Township; Rockwood; Romulus; Sumpter Township; Taylor; Buren Township; Westland | 2011 Apportionment Plan | |
