= Michigan's 22nd House of Representatives district =

American legislative district

Michigan's 22nd State House of Representatives district
Representative
Matt Koleszar; D–Plymouth
- Demographics: 83.9% White; 2.8% Black; 3.4% Hispanic; 5.9% Asian; 0.1% Native American; 0.4% Other; 3.5% Multiracial
- Population (2024): 89,096

Michigan's 22nd House of Representatives district is a legislative district within the Michigan House of Representatives located in Wayne County. The district was created in 1965, when the Michigan Supreme Court ordered the reapportionment of state legislative districts from a county-based system to a proportional one following the Supreme Court case Reynolds v. Sims. It is currently represented by Democrat Matt Koleszar of Plymouth.

== List of representatives ==
Representative	Party	Years	Residence	Notes
Daisy Elliott	Democratic	1965–1972	Detroit	Reapportioned from the former Wayne County, 4th district; redistricted to the 8th district.
Gary Mack Owen	Democratic	1973–1988	Ypsilanti	
Kirk A. Profit	Democratic	1989–1992	Ypsilanti	Redistricted to the 54th district.
Gregory E. Pitoniak	Democratic	1993–1997	Taylor	Redistricted from the 29th district; resigned January 1997 after being appointed mayor of Taylor.
Raymond E. Basham	Democratic	1997 (Note: Elected in a 1997 special election to replace Rep. Gregory E. Pitoniak, who resigned.)–2002	Taylor	Term limited.
Hoon-Yung Hopgood	Democratic	2003–2008	Taylor	Term limited.
Douglas A. Geiss	Democratic	2009–2012	Taylor	Redistricted to the 12th district.
Harold L. Haugh	Democratic	2013–2014	Roseville	Redistricted from the 42nd district; term limited.
John Chirkun	Democratic	2015–2020	Roseville	Term limited.
Richard Steenland	Democratic	2021–2022	Roseville	
Matt Koleszar	Democratic	2023–present	Plymouth	Redistricted from the 20th district.
Lisa McIntyre	Democratic	(Note: Member-elect.)	Northville	

== Historical district boundaries ==
Map	Description	Apportionment Plan	Notes
	Wayne County (part): Detroit (part)	1964 Apportionment Plan (Note: Referred to as the Austin-Kleiner plan.)	
	Washtenaw County (part): Ypsilanti; Ypsilanti Township; Wayne County (part): Belleville; Romulus Township (part); Van Buren Township	1972 Apportionment Plan (Note: Referred to as the Hatcher-Kleiner plan.)	
	Washtenaw County (part): Northfield Township; Salem Township; Superior Township; Webster Township; Ypsilanti; Ypsilanti Township	1982 Apportionment Plan	
	Wayne County (part): Romulus; Taylor (part)	1992 Apportionment Plan	
	Wayne County (part): Romulus; Taylor	2001 Apportionment Plan	
	Macomb County (part): Roseville; Warren (part)	2011 Apportionment Plan	
	Wayne County (part): Livonia (part); Northville (part); Northville Township (part); Plymouth; Plymouth Township (part)	2021 Apportionment Plan (Note: Referred to as the Hickory plan.)	

== Recent elections ==
=== 2020s ===
2026 Michigan House of Representatives election
Party	Candidate	Votes	%
Democratic	Lisa McIntyre	30,169	55.78
Republican	Casey J. Noce	23,921	44.22
Total votes		54,090	100
Democratic hold			

2024 Michigan House of Representatives election
Party	Candidate	Votes	%
Democratic	Matt Koleszar (incumbent)	31,555	52.5
Republican	Adam A. Stathakis	28,555	47.5
Total votes		60,110	100
Democratic hold			

2022 Michigan House of Representatives election
Party	Candidate	Votes	%
Democratic	Matt Koleszar	28,051	54.25
Republican	Cathryn Neracher	23,660	45.75
Total votes		51,711	100
Democratic hold			

2020 Michigan House of Representatives election
Party	Candidate	Votes	%
Democratic	Richard M. Steenland	24,954	59.91
Republican	Steven G. Warner	16,701	40.09
Total votes		41,655	100
Democratic hold			

=== 2010s ===
2018 Michigan House of Representatives election
Party	Candidate	Votes	%
Democratic	John Chirkun (incumbent)	18,841	62.36
Republican	Arthur "Art" Blundell	10,374	34.34
Libertarian	Matt Kuehnel	999	3.31
Total votes		30,214	100
Democratic hold			

2016 Michigan House of Representatives election
Party	Candidate	Votes	%
Democratic	John Chirkun (incumbent)	21,487	60.34
Republican	Jeff Bonnell	12,341	34.66
U.S. Taxpayers'	Les Townsend	1,780	5
Total votes		35,608	100
Democratic hold			

2014 Michigan House of Representatives election
Party	Candidate	Votes	%
Democratic	John Chirkun	13,461	63.96
Republican	Jeff Bonnell	6,704	31.85
U.S. Taxpayers'	Les Townsend	882	4.19
Total votes		21,047	100
Democratic hold			

2012 Michigan House of Representatives election
Party	Candidate	Votes	%
Democratic	Harold L. Haugh	24,077	70.38
Republican	Arthur "Art" Blundell	10,134	29.62
Total votes		34,211	100
Democratic hold			

2010 Michigan House of Representatives election
Party	Candidate	Votes	%
Democratic	Douglas A. Geiss (incumbent)	14,296	67.93
Republican	Darrell McNeill	6,748	32.07
Total votes		21,044	100
Democratic hold			

=== 2000s ===
2008 Michigan House of Representatives election
Party	Candidate	Votes	%
Democratic	Douglas A. Geiss	25,676	70.59
Republican	Darrell McNeill	6,780	18.64
Independent	Charley Johnson	3,180	8.74
Libertarian	Dennis Schlemmer	739	2.03
Total votes		36,375	100
Democratic hold			

2006 Michigan House of Representatives election
Party	Candidate	Votes	%
Democratic	Hoon-Yung Hopgood (incumbent)	19,260	73.97
Republican	Ben Armstrong	5,882	22.59
U.S. Taxpayers'	Rick Butkowski	895	3.44
Total votes		26,037	100
Democratic hold			

2004 Michigan House of Representatives election
Party	Candidate	Votes	%
Democratic	Hoon-Yung Hopgood (incumbent)	24,375	69.55
Republican	Fred W. Kalsic	8,863	25.29
U.S. Taxpayers'	Rick Butkowski	1,807	5.16
Total votes		35,045	100
Democratic hold			

2002 Michigan House of Representatives election
Party	Candidate	Votes	%
Democratic	Hoon-Yung Hopgood	14,042	68.85
Republican	Ronald Vaughan	5,696	27.93
Libertarian	Charles H. Kainz	657	3.22
Total votes		20,395	100
Democratic hold			

2000 Michigan House of Representatives election
Party	Candidate	Votes	%
Democratic	Raymond E. Basham (incumbent)	19,627	73.56
Republican	Robert J. Chmielewski	6,115	22.92
Libertarian	Kenneth Reyes	941	3.53
Total votes		26,683	100
Democratic hold			

=== 1990s ===
1998 Michigan House of Representatives election
Party	Candidate	Votes	%
Democratic	Raymond E. Basham (incumbent)	13,147	69.38
Republican	Susan Lee Chmielewski	5,123	27.04
Libertarian	James Victor Sager	578	3.58
Total votes		18,948	100
Democratic hold			
