= Kimberly Edwards =

American politician

Member of the Michigan House of Representatives from the 12th district
- Incumbent
- Assumed office January 1, 2023
- Preceded by: Alex Garza

Personal details
- Party: Democratic

Kimberly L. Edwards is an American politician serving as a member of the Michigan House of Representatives since 2023, representing the 12th district. She is a member of the Democratic Party.

== Early life ==
Edwards was born on the west side of Detroit.

== Political career ==
She was elected to the Michigan House of Representatives from the 12th district in the 2022 election. Edwards was endorsed by the League of Conservation Voters.

Edwards won reelection in 2024.
