= Senator Niles =

Senator Niles may refer to:

- Dalwin J. Niles (1914–1979), New York State Senate
- John Milton Niles (1787–1856), U.S. Senator from Connecticut from 1843 to 1849
- Johnson Niles (1794–1872), Michigan State Senate
