= Michigan's 12th House of Representatives district =

American legislative district

Michigan's 12th State House of Representatives district
Representative
Kimberly Edwards; D–Eastpointe
- Demographics: 44.1% White; 47.9% Black; 2.3% Hispanic; 1.1% Asian; 0.1% Native American; 0.3% Other; 4.3% Multiracial
- Population (2024): 87,822

Michigan's 12th House of Representatives district is a legislative district within the Michigan House of Representatives located in the counties of Macomb and Wayne. The district was created in 1965, when the Michigan Supreme Court ordered the reapportionment of state legislative districts from a county-based system to a proportional one following the Supreme Court case Reynolds v. Sims. It is currently represented by Democrat Kimberly Edwards of Eastpointe.

== List of representatives ==
Representative	Party	Years	Residence	Notes
George H. Edwards	Democratic	1965–1972	Detroit	Reapportioned from the former Wayne County, 11th district; redistricted to the 9th district.
William B. Fitzgerald Jr.	Democratic	1973–1974	Detroit	Redistricted from the 4th district.
Dennis Mark Hertel	Democratic	1975–1980	Detroit	
Curtis Hertel Sr.	Democratic	1981–1992	Detroit	Redistricted to the 2nd district.
Alma Grace Stallworth	Democratic	1993–1996	Detroit	Redistricted from the 4th district.
Keith B. Stallworth	Democratic	1997–2002	Detroit	Term limited.
Steve H. Tobocman	Democratic	2003–2008	Detroit	Term limited.
Rashida Tlaib	Democratic	2009–2012	Detroit	Redistricted to the 6th district.
Douglas A. Geiss	Democratic	2013–2014	Taylor	Redistricted from the 22nd district; term limited.
Erika Geiss	Democratic	2015–2018	Taylor	
Alex Garza	Democratic	2019–2022	Taylor	
Kimberly Edwards	Democratic	2023–present	Eastpointe	

== Historical district boundaries ==
Map	Description	Apportionment Plan	Notes
	Wayne County (part): Detroit (part)	1964 Apportionment Plan (Note: Referred to as the Austin-Kleiner plan.)	
	Wayne County (part): Detroit (part)	1972 Apportionment Plan (Note: Referred to as the Hatcher-Kleiner plan.)	
	Wayne County (part): Detroit (part)	1982 Apportionment Plan	
	Wayne County (part): Detroit (part)	1992 Apportionment Plan	
	Wayne County (part): Detroit (part)	2001 Apportionment Plan	
	Wayne County (part): Romulus; Taylor; Van Buren Township (part)	2011 Apportionment Plan	
	Macomb County (part): Eastpointe; Roseville (part); Wayne County (part): Detroit (part)	2021 Apportionment Plan (Note: Referred to as the Hickory plan.)	
	Macomb County (part): Eastpointe; Grosse Pointe Shores (part); St. Clair Shores (part); Wayne County (part): Detroit (part); Grosse Pointe Woods (part)	Remedial 2021 Apportionment Plan Approved in 2024 (Note: Referred to as the Motown Sound FC E1 plan.)	

== Recent elections ==
=== 2020s ===
2026 Michigan House of Representatives election
Party	Candidate	Votes	%
Democratic	Kimberly L. Edwards (incumbent)	27,380	73.18
Republican	Randell J. Shafer	10,036	26.82
Total votes		37,416	100
Democratic hold			

2024 Michigan House of Representatives election
Party	Candidate	Votes	%
Democratic	Kimberly L. Edwards (incumbent)	31,256	69.67
Republican	Randell J. Shafer	13,609	30.33
Total votes		44,865	100
Democratic hold			

2022 Michigan House of Representatives election
Party	Candidate	Votes	%
Democratic	Kimberly L. Edwards	20,962	70.43
Republican	Diane Saber	8,159	27.41
Libertarian	Gregory Creswell	643	2.16
Total votes		29,764	100
Democratic hold			

2020 Michigan House of Representatives election
Party	Candidate	Votes	%
Democratic	Alex Garza (incumbent)	27,300	62.35
Republican	Michelle Bailey	16,488	37.65
Total votes		43,788	100
Democratic hold			

=== 2010s ===
2018 Michigan House of Representatives election
Party	Candidate	Votes	%
Democratic	Alex Garza	21,104	66.64
Republican	Michelle Bailey	10,567	33.36
Total votes		31,671	100
Democratic hold			

2016 Michigan House of Representatives election
Party	Candidate	Votes	%
Democratic	Erika Geiss (incumbent)	24,716	67.11
Republican	Erik Soderquist	12,112	32.89
Total votes		36,828	100
Democratic hold			

2014 Michigan House of Representatives election
Party	Candidate	Votes	%
Democratic	Erika Geiss	15,334	69.61
Republican	Kelly Thompson	6,696	30.39
Total votes		22,030	100
Democratic hold			

2012 Michigan House of Representatives election
Party	Candidate	Votes	%
Democratic	Douglas A. Geiss	28,498	75.21
Republican	Joanne Michalik	9,395	24.79
Total votes		37,893	100
Democratic hold			

2010 Michigan House of Representatives election
Party	Candidate	Votes	%
Democratic	Rashida Tlaib (incumbent)	6,997	91.97
Republican	Darrin Daigle	611	8.03
Total votes		7,608	100
Democratic hold			

=== 2000s ===
2008 Michigan House of Representatives election
Party	Candidate	Votes	%
Democratic	Rashida Tlaib	14,228	90.06
Republican	Darrin Daigle	1,571	9.94
Total votes		15,799	100
Democratic hold			

2006 Michigan House of Representatives election
Party	Candidate	Votes	%
Democratic	Steve Tobocman (incumbent)	9,385	95.66
Libertarian	Raymond H. Warner	426	4.34
Total votes		9,811	100
Democratic hold			

2004 Michigan House of Representatives election
Party	Candidate	Votes	%
Democratic	Steve Tobocman (incumbent)	13,658	86.69
Republican	Anita M. Salazar	1,777	11.28
Libertarian	Raymond H. Warner	320	2.03
Total votes		15,755	100
Democratic hold			

2002 Michigan House of Representatives election
Party	Candidate	Votes	%
Democratic	Steve Tobocman	8,406	90.19
Republican	Chester R. Calka	914	9.81
Total votes		9,320	100
Democratic hold			

2000 Michigan House of Representatives election
Party	Candidate	Votes	%
Democratic	Keith B. Stallworth (incumbent)	31,149	96.37
Republican	Karen L. Mastney	770	2.38
Libertarian	Michael L. Donahue	404	1.25
Total votes		32,323	100
Democratic hold			

=== 1990s ===
1998 Michigan House of Representatives election
Party	Candidate	Votes	%
Democratic	Keith B. Stallworth (incumbent)	23,942	95.96
Republican	Tremell Anderson	1,007	4.04
Total votes		24,949	100
Democratic hold			
