= Hoon-Yung Hopgood =

Korean American politician (born 1974)

Member of the Michigan Senate
- In office January 1, 2011 – December 31, 2018
- Preceded by: Raymond E. Basham
- Succeeded by: Erika Geiss
- Constituency: 8th district (2011–2014); 6th district (2015–2018)

Member of the Michigan House of Representatives from the 22nd district
- In office January 1, 2003 – December 31, 2008
- Preceded by: Raymond E. Basham
- Succeeded by: Douglas A. Geiss

Personal details
- Born: December 8, 1974 (age 51) Incheon, South Korea
- Party: Democratic
- Spouse: Sunhwa
- Children: 2
- Education: University of Michigan

Hoon-Yung Hopgood (born December 8, 1974) is a former member of the Michigan State Senate, representing the 6th district (formerly numbered as the 8th district) from 2011 until 2018. He is a Democrat and a former member of the Michigan State House of Representatives. He represented roughly half of the cities which make up the Downriver area of Metro Detroit, as well as other cities in Wayne County. He is the first Korean American to hold state office in Michigan.

== Early life ==
Hopgood was born in Incheon, South Korea, in 1974, and was adopted in 1976 by Diane Hopgood, former principal at Johnson Elementary in Taylor, Michigan, and the late Rollie Hopgood, who was president of the Michigan Federation of Teachers and School Related Personnel. He received his bachelor's degree from the University of Michigan in 1996. In 2002 he became an aide to former State Representative Ray Basham.

== Political career ==
Hopgood was elected to the Michigan House of Representatives in 2002, representing the 22nd District, which includes the cities of Romulus, Michigan and Taylor. He has become a leader on educational issues in the state. He was a member of the Children's Caucus, a board member of the Michigan Youth in Government, and a member of the House Democratic Task Force on Early Education and Care. He is on the Steering Committee for the Michigan Coalition on Civic Education, and was part of the Michigan delegation to the Congressional Conference on Civic Education in Washington, D.C.

In his final term, Hopgood served on six committees in the House of Representatives: Transportation - Chair, Education, Subcommittee on High School Graduation - Chair, Energy and Technology, Labor, and Senior Health and Retirement.

After serving three terms in the House of Representatives, Hopgood was term limited and was ineligible to serve again.

In 2010 Hopgood was elected to the Michigan Senate, where he served on the Senate Education Committee, Energy and Technology Committee, and Appropriations Committee. He resides in Taylor.

== Electoral history ==
Michigan Senate District 8 General Election, 2010
Party	Candidate	Votes	%	±%
Democratic	Hoon-Yung Hopgood	37,845	54.9	+18.3
Republican	Ken Larkin	25,280	36.6	−18.3
Independent	Neil Sawicki	4,697	6.8	−48.1
Libertarian	Loel Gnadt	1,093	1.5	−53.4

Michigan House of Representatives District 22 General Election, 2006
Party	Candidate	Votes	%	±%
Democratic	Hoon-Yung Hopgood (Incumbent)	19,260	73.9	+51.4
Republican	Ben Armstrong	5,882	22.5	−51.4
Constitution	Rick Butkowski	895	3.4	−70.5

Michigan House of Representatives District 22 General Election, 2004
Party	Candidate	Votes	%	±%
Democratic	Hoon-Yung Hopgood (Incumbent)	24,375	69.5	+44.3
Republican	Fred Kalsic	8,863	25.2	−44.3
Constitution	Rick Butkowski	1,807	5.1	−64.4

Michigan House of Representatives District 22 General Election, 2002
Party	Candidate	Votes	%	±%
Democratic	Hoon-Yung Hopgood	14,042	68.8	+40.9
Republican	Ronald Vaughan	5,696	27.9	−40.9
Libertarian	Charles Kainz	657	3.2	−65.6
