= Gardner D. Williams =

American politician

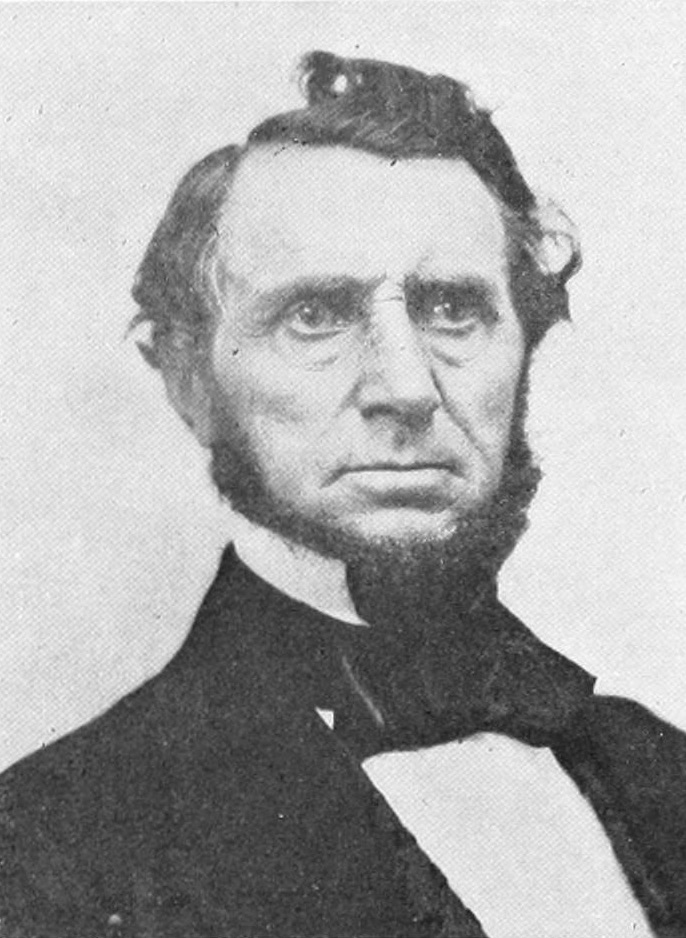

Member of the Michigan House of Representatives from the Saginaw County district
- In office November 2, 1835 – January 1, 1837
- In office January 6, 1840 – January 3, 1841

Member of the Michigan Senate from the 6th district
- In office January 6, 1845 – January 3, 1847

Personal details
- Born: September 9, 1804 Concord, Massachusetts
- Died: December 11, 1858 (aged 54) Saginaw, Michigan
- Party: Democratic

Gardner Davenport Williams (September 9, 1804 – December 11, 1858) was an American politician who served two terms in the Michigan Senate and two terms in the Michigan House of Representatives.

== Early life and career ==
Gardner Williams was born in Concord, Massachusetts on September 9, 1804. He was the son of Major Oliver Williams and Mary Lee.

Oliver Williams left his family in Concord and went to Detroit in 1807 to work as a merchant, bringing with him $64,000 ($1.41 million in 2025) in goods to trade. He built a sloop named Friends Good Will and was returning to Mackinac Island from Chicago on a government-chartered voyage when his vessel was captured by the British, who had taken Mackinac Island while he was away. He was taken as a prisoner of war and later paroled to Detroit; his vessel was armed by the British and renamed Little Belt. It was later recaptured by Commodore Oliver Hazard Perry in the Battle of Lake Erie and is the sloop Perry referenced in his report, "We have met the enemy and they are ours: Two ships, two brigs, one schooner and one sloop."

Following the war, Oliver Williams moved his family to Detroit, arriving on November 5, 1815. He opened the Yankee Hotel on his property at Jefferson Avenue and Bates Street and ran it for several years. The family moved again, to Silver Lake, Michigan, in 1819, with Oliver Williams cutting a road through the wilderness, driving the first team of horses from Detroit to Pontiac, and settling in the frontier village of Waterford, Michigan.

Starting in 1827, Gardner Williams moved to Saginaw, Michigan and went into the Indian trade with his brother Ephraim, as an agent of the American Fur Company. He spoke the Chippewa dialect fluently. Alexis de Tocqueville visited the Williams brothers' store on his visit to Saginaw in 1831. The Williams brothers hired their cousin Harvey to build the first sawmill on the Saginaw River in 1834.

Williams married Elizabeth Beach in 1829. They had three sons. His wife survived him and died on September 27, 1862. Accounts also indicate he may have had at least one daughter by a Native American woman.

== Political career ==
In 1831, Williams was elected to represent Saginaw Township on the Oakland County board, and was appointed as a justice of the peace later that year. He was a member of the state's first constitutional convention in 1835 and was named to the state's first board of internal improvements on March 21, 1837. Williams was elected as a Democrat to the Michigan House of Representatives in its first session after approval of the constitution in 1835, and re-elected in 1840; he was later elected to the Michigan Senate for two terms in 1845 and 1846.

Williams was appointed postmaster of Saginaw in 1840, following the resignation of his brother Ephraim upon his moving away, and held the position for nine years. He was elected mayor of Saginaw in 1857 and served until his death there on December 11, 1858.
