= Harold Haugh =

American politician from Michigan

Harold L. Haugh

Macomb County Commissioner
- Incumbent
- Assumed office January 1, 2019
- Preceded by: Kathy Tocco
- Constituency: 11th district (2019–2022); 10th district (2023–present)

Member of the Michigan House of Representatives
- In office January 1, 2009 – December 31, 2014
- Preceded by: Frank Accavitti
- Succeeded by: John Chirkun
- Constituency: 42nd district (2009–2012); 22nd district (2013–2014)

Mayor of Roseville
- In office 2006–2008
- Succeeded by: John Chirkun

Personal details
- Born: November 23, 1949 (age 76) Detroit, Michigan
- Party: Democratic
- Spouse: Catherine

Harold Haugh (born November 23, 1949) is a Democratic politician who currently serves on the Macomb County Board of Commissioners. Haugh previously served in the Michigan House of Representatives, originally elected in 2008. Prior to that, Haugh served as the mayor of Roseville, Michigan.
