= Steve Tobocman =

American politician

Member of the Michigan House of Representatives from the 12th district
- In office January 1, 2003 – December 31, 2008
- Preceded by: Keith Stallworth
- Succeeded by: Rashida Tlaib

Personal details
- Born: Steven Hershel Tobocman; January 27, 1970 (age 56)
- Party: Democratic
- Children: 2
- Education: University of Michigan Law School

Steven Hershel Tobocman (born January 27, 1970) is a politician from the state of Michigan. He served two terms in the Michigan House of Representatives. Because of state law on term limits, he could not run for a succeeding third term.

A Democrat, he represented the 12th district in Southwest Detroit. Tobocman was elected by his party to be the Democratic Floor Leader for the 2007-2008 legislative session. He expressed his support for candidate Rashida Tlaib from Detroit as his successor. She won the seat, becoming the first Muslim woman to serve in the Michigan state legislature.

== Political career ==
Tobocman was elected to office in 2002. In 2007, his fellow Democrats in the House elected him as the Democratic Floor Leader. He also authored legislation dealing with illegal immigration (The Michigan Immigration Clerical Assistant Act).

== Current work ==
Since completing his time in elected office, Tobocman has served as the co-director of the Michigan Foreclosure Task Force. This is a 200-member network of foreclosure counseling agencies, community development corporations, legal services attorneys, neighborhood associations, local governments, statewide trade associations, and banks that work on the front lines of the foreclosure crisis in Michigan.

He also co-directs the Michigan Political Leadership Program at Michigan State University. He has spearheaded Global Detroit, a regional economic development strategy that is building on immigrants and internationals as a means of revitalizing metro Detroit's economy. He is the Managing Partner of New Solutions Group, LLC.
