= Erika Geiss =

American politician

Member of the Michigan Senate
- Incumbent
- Assumed office January 1, 2019
- Preceded by: Hoon-Yung Hopgood
- Constituency: 6th district (2019–2022); 1st district (2023–present)

Member of the Michigan House of Representatives from the 12th district
- In office January 1, 2015 – January 1, 2019
- Preceded by: Doug Geiss
- Succeeded by: Alex Garza

Personal details
- Party: Democratic
- Spouse: Doug Geiss
- Children: 2
- Education: Brandeis University and Tufts University
- Website: Official website

Erika Geiss is a Democratic politician from Michigan currently representing the 1st Senate district. Geiss previously represented the 6th senate district.

== Biography ==
Geiss is the granddaughter of Afro-Panamanian immigrants. She attended Brandeis University, where she received her bachelor’s degree in developmental psychology. She went on to receive a master’s degree in art and architectural history at Tufts University.

She previously served in the Michigan House of Representatives for the 12th district – which comprises Romulus, Taylor and part of Van Buren Township – in the Michigan House of Representatives after being elected in November 2014. She succeeded her husband, Doug Geiss, in office in the 12th district.

She was elected to the 6th District of the Michigan Senate in 2019, and to the 1st District in 2023.

== Personal life ==
Geiss is Catholic.
