= Alex Garza =

American politician (born 1994)

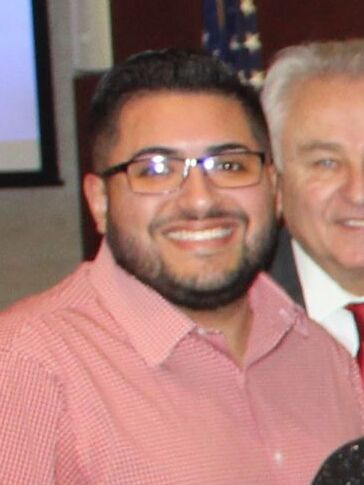
- Garza in 2024

Member of the Wayne County Commission from the 14th district
- Incumbent
- Assumed office January 4, 2024
- Preceded by: Raymond Basham

Member of the Michigan House of Representatives from the 12th district
- In office January 1, 2019 – January 1, 2023
- Preceded by: Erika Geiss
- Succeeded by: James DeSana (redistricting)

Personal details
- Born: February 13, 1994 (age 32) Detroit, Michigan USA
- Party: Democratic
- Spouse: Amira Garza
- Education: University of Michigan–Dearborn; Baker College
- Website: Alex For Michigan

Alex Avery Garza (born February 13, 1994) is an American politician serving on the Wayne County Commission since 2024. A Democrat, he previously served as a member of the Michigan House of Representatives from 2019 to 2023.

Garza had political experience before his current term as State Representative. Garza was elected Taylor City Council member, and served on the council from in 2013 and 2018 and served as legislative aide to Stephanie Chang and Rashida Tlaib. His election in 2013 marked the first time in history a person of color held local office in Taylor, Michigan. Garza served as Mayor Pro-Tem of the Taylor City Council from 2017 until his inauguration as State Representative in 2019. Garza was the youngest Latino ever elected to the state house.

In 2021, Garza announced his intention to run for mayor of Taylor. In 2024, he was appointed by the Wayne County Commission to succeed Raymond Basham, who resigned due to health concerns.

Political offices
Preceded by Erika Geiss	Michigan Representatives; 12th District; 2019–present	Succeeded by Incumbent
