= Roseville High School (Michigan) =

Location
- 17855 Common Rd; Roseville, Michigan 48066; United States; 42°31′09″N 82°56′13″W

Information
- Type: Public high school
- School district: Roseville Community Schools
- Principal: Jason Bettin
- Teaching staff: 57.6 (on an FTE basis)
- Grades: 9-12
- Enrollment: 1,228 (2023-2024)
- Student to teacher ratio: 21.32
- Campus: Suburb, large
- Colors: Red, White, and Black
- Athletics conference: Macomb Area Conference
- Nickname: Panthers
- Website: rosevillepride.org/our-schools/secondary-schools/roseville-high-school/

Roseville High School is a public high school in the Metro Detroit city of Roseville, Michigan that serves grades 9–12. It is the only high school in the Roseville Community Schools district.

The high school was established in 1967 as Carl Brablec High School. It was renamed as Roseville High School in 1989 when it merged with the other high school in the city of Roseville.

== Demographics ==
The demographic breakdown of the 1,228 students enrolled during the 2023–2024 school year was:

- Male - 53.9% (662)
- Female - 46.1% (566)
- Native American/Alaskan - <0.05% (5)
- Native Hawaiian/Pacific Islander - <0.05% (4)
- Asian - <0.05% (21)
- Black - 49.6% (609)
- Hispanic - <0.05% (25)
- White - 41.1% (505)
- Two or More Races - 0.05% (59)

69.4% (852) of the students were eligible for free or reduced-cost lunch.

== Notable alumni ==
- Crystal Reed, actress
- Ernie Whitt, professional baseball player
- Seth Conley. Capo Gambino crime family
