= Johnathan P. King =

American politician

Member of the Michigan House of Representatives from the Mackinac County district
- In office November 2, 1835 – January 5, 1840
- In office January 3, 1842 – January 1, 1843
- In office January 3, 1848 – December 31, 1848

Member of the Michigan Senate from the 6th district
- In office January 1, 1849 – January 31, 1851

Personal details
- Born: December 4, 1794 Brandon, Vermont
- Died: January 30, 1860 (aged 65) Mackinac Island, Michigan
- Party: Democratic

Jonathan Parsons King (December 4, 1794 – January 30, 1860) was an American politician who served six terms in the Michigan House of Representatives and two terms in the Michigan Senate, in addition to serving for decades in local posts in Mackinac County, Michigan, including postmaster and county clerk. He was a grandson of the explorer Jonathan Carver and unsuccessfully attempted to verify Carver's claims that he had been deeded large portions of present-day Wisconsin and Minnesota by the Sioux.

== Biography ==
Jonathan Parsons King was born in Brandon, Vermont, on December 4, 1794. He was the son of Simeon King and Mary Carver, and the grandson of colonial-era explorer Jonathan Carver.

In 1817, King left Vermont in order to investigate his grandfather Jonathan Carver's claims that Sioux chiefs had deeded him 10,000 square miles (30,000 km^{2}) of land in present-day Wisconsin and Minnesota. In July 1817, he and another of Carver's grandsons traveled in a birch bark canoe from Green Bay to Prairie du Chien, Wisconsin. They rendezvoused there on July 9 with explorer Stephen H. Long and traveled alongside his skiff up the Mississippi River in order to meet with Native Americans at the Falls of Saint Anthony in an attempt to validate the claim. They traveled together for two days before parting ways, meeting up again briefly on July 18, twenty miles south of the junction with the St. Croix River, when Long was on his way back south on the river. King and his party returned to Prairie du Chien on July 29, and Long recorded in his journal that King and his party had had no luck verifying the claim.

King later settled in Mackinac County, Michigan. He was elected as a Democrat to the Michigan House of Representatives in the first elections following adoption of the state constitution in 1835, and served through 1839. He again served in the house in 1842 and 1848, and was then elected to two terms in the Michigan Senate in 1849 and 1850. He also served as president of Mackinac Village in 1856, and was its postmaster from 1829 to 1849 and again from 1853 to 1859. He was the clerk of Mackinac County from 1825 to 1846. While residing on Mackinac Island King was a founding member, and the first Worshipful Master of Mackinac Lodge No. 71 F&AM when it was Chartered in January 1855.

In 1852, King won election as probate judge, 116 votes to 114. His opponent was Dennis Chidester, who was a follower of the "King of Beaver Island", James Jesse Strang, the head of a schismatic sect of the Church of Jesus Christ of Latter Day Saints. Chidester was also a representative of the canvassing board for Newaygo County, to which Beaver Island was attached, and he was instrumental in convincing the board of the legitimacy of Strang's own election as a state representative that winter. Fellow Mormons won several other local positions, including sheriff; the latter's warnings on May 12, 1853, that he would begin to enforce a ban on the trade of liquor by sailing vessels in the area, led to King co-signing a notice calling for a public meeting for locals to "devise ways and means of protecting themselves against the felonious depredations of the Mormons". King served as probate judge until 1860.

In 1849, King was instrumental in securing passage of a joint resolution of the legislature asking the U.S. Congress to appropriate $500,000 to build the St. Mary's Falls Ship Canal, though the effort to obtain the appropriation was not successful until 1852.

He died on Mackinac Island on January 30, 1860.
