= Roseville Community Schools =

School district in Michigan

Address
- 18975 Church St. Roseville, Macomb, Michigan; United States

District information
- Type: Public
- Grades: PreK-12
- Established: 1952; 74 years ago
- Superintendent: Mark Blaszkowski
- Schools: 10
- Budget: US$76,025,000 (2022-2023)
- NCES District ID: 2630210

Students and staff
- Students: 4,133 (2024-2025)
- Teachers: 249.14 FTE (2024-2025)
- Staff: 575.14 FTE (2024-2025)
- Student–teacher ratio: 16.59 (2024-2025)

Other information
- Website: rosevillepride.org

Roseville Community Schools is a public school district serving Roseville, Michigan in Metro Detroit.

== History ==
The city's first dedicated high schools, Burton and Eastland, were built in 1922, in separate districts. Lincoln School was built on the northwest corner of Blum and Chestnut in 1925 and closed in 2010. All three schools have since been demolished. By at least 1949, Burton High School had become Roseville High School.

The school district was formed in 1952 by the merger of part of the former Kern Road Schools district and Burton School District. In 1956 the district annexed Eastland Community School District. In 1960 it annexed Greater Gratiot Schools to achieve its current boundaries.

Roseville Middle School was formerly Roseville High School and was built in 1956. The architecture firm was Wyeth & Harman of Port Huron. With the opening of the new high school, Eastland High School closed. Carl Brablec High School was established in 1967 and shared the Roseville High School building on a half-day basis until its own building opened in 1969. The designer of the new building was Wakely Kushner Associates Architects. In 1989, the two high schools merged at Brablec High School, becoming Roseville High School Brablec Building. The former high school became Roseville Middle School.

== Schools ==
Schools in Roseville Community Schools district
School	Address	Notes
Roseville High School	17855 Common	Grades 9-12. Also known as Brablec Building, built 1969.
Eastland Middle School	18700 Frank	Grades 6-8. Built 1963.
Roseville Middle School	16250 Martin	Grades 6-8. Built 1956.
Dort Elementary	16225 Dort Street	Grades PreK-5. Built 1957.
Fountain Elementary	16850 Wellington	Grades PreK-5. Built 1957.
Green Elementary	18530 Marquette	Grades PreK-5
Kaiser Elementary	16700 Wildwood	Grades PreK-5. Built 1952.
Kment Elementary	20033 Washington	Grades PreK-5
Patton Elementary	18851 McKinnon	Grades PreK-5
Steenland Elementary	16335 Chestnut	Grades PreK-5
