= Johnson Niles =

American politician

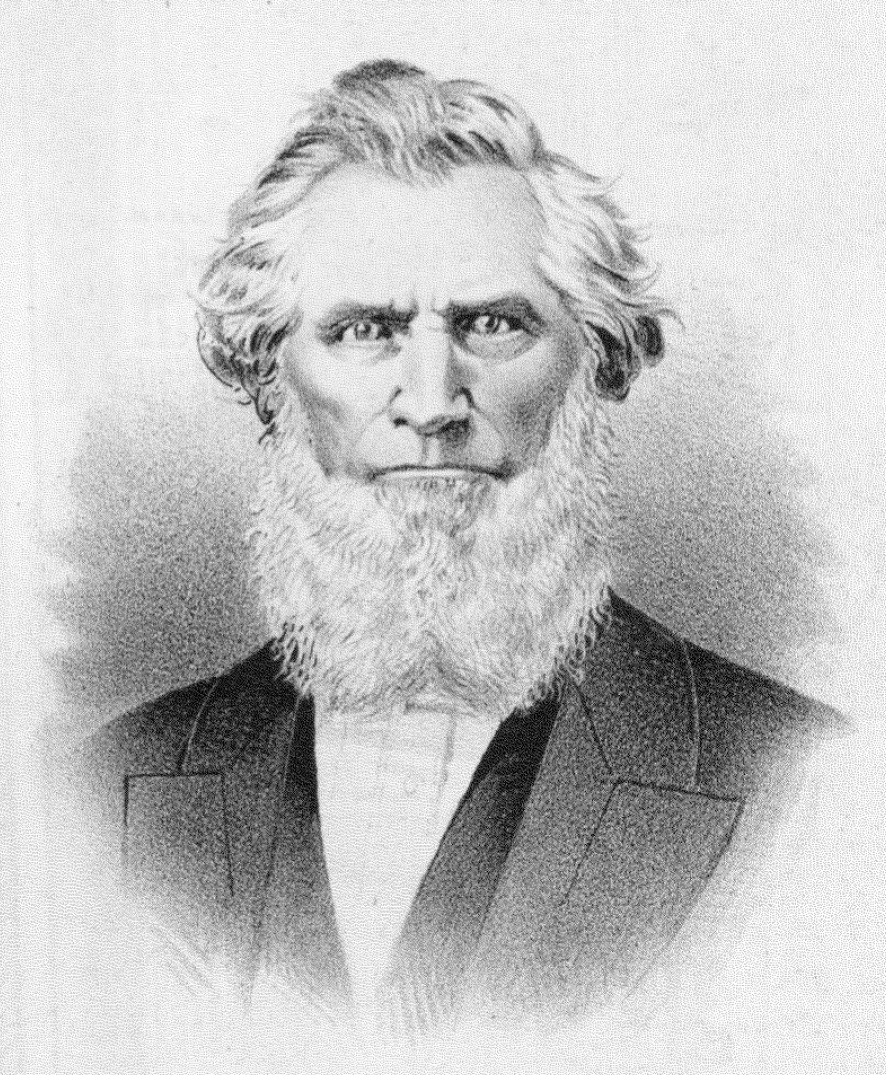

Member of the Michigan House of Representatives from the Oakland County district
- In office November 2, 1835 – January 1, 1837

Member of the Michigan Senate from the 6th district
- In office January 1, 1844 – January 4, 1846

Personal details
- Born: May 2, 1794 Richfield, New York
- Died: March 23, 1872 (aged 77) Troy, Michigan
- Party: Democratic

Johnson Niles (May 2, 1794 – March 23, 1872) was an American politician who served one term in the Michigan House of Representatives and two terms in the Michigan Senate in the early years of Michigan's statehood. He was an early settler of Oakland County, Michigan, and the founder of Troy, Michigan.

== Biography ==
Johnson Niles was born May 2, 1794, at Richfield, New York, the son of Samuel Niles, who was wounded fighting under General Nathanael Greene during the American Revolutionary War. Niles grew up in New York, eventually moving to Steuben County, where Governor DeWitt Clinton commissioned him as paymaster of a battalion in the state militia.

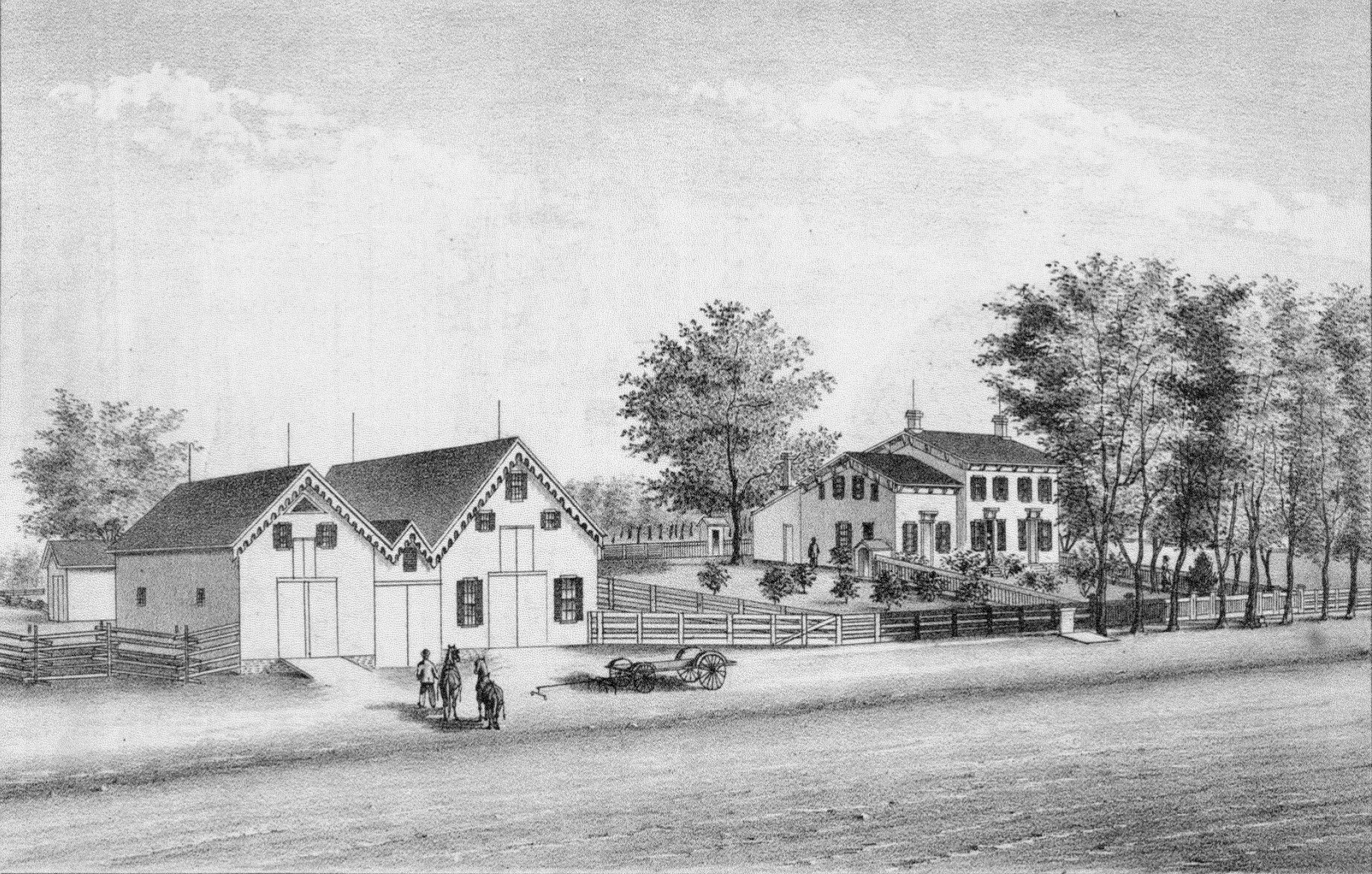
The Niles homestead c. 1877.

Niles purchased 160 acres (65 ha) in Oakland County, in the spring of 1821. He returned to New York to collect his family and brought them to Detroit on a 14-day schooner voyage from Dunkirk, New York. He went back to Oakland County, which had fourteen families living in it at the time, and helped erect a number of buildings. He built a log home for himself the following year, and moved his family into it. The settlement became known as Troy Corners, the site of present-day Troy, Michigan. The nearest other settlers were 13 miles away, and Niles cut his own road to the settlement, where he began trading with local Native Americans. He grew the business into a full store by 1830, and at that time opened a tavern as well, and later opened a large hotel, the Troy Hotel, on the Fourth of July in 1837.

He established a reputation as a leader in the state's Democratic Party, and a historian noted of him, "It was frequently remarked that no Democratic convention was complete without Johnson Niles". He was commissioned as the first postmaster in Troy in 1823, and held the post until 1840; President John Tyler re-appointed him and he served until the election of President Franklin Pierce, who appointed Niles's son George to succeed him. Governor Lewis Cass appointed him justice of the peace in 1823, and he was repeatedly re-appointed for several more terms. He was appointed a commissioner of Oakland County in 1826, and he held the office for several years. In the first election for the newly established Michigan House of Representatives in 1835, Niles was elected to represent Oakland County, serving one term. He was elected to the Michigan Senate and served from 1844 to 1845.

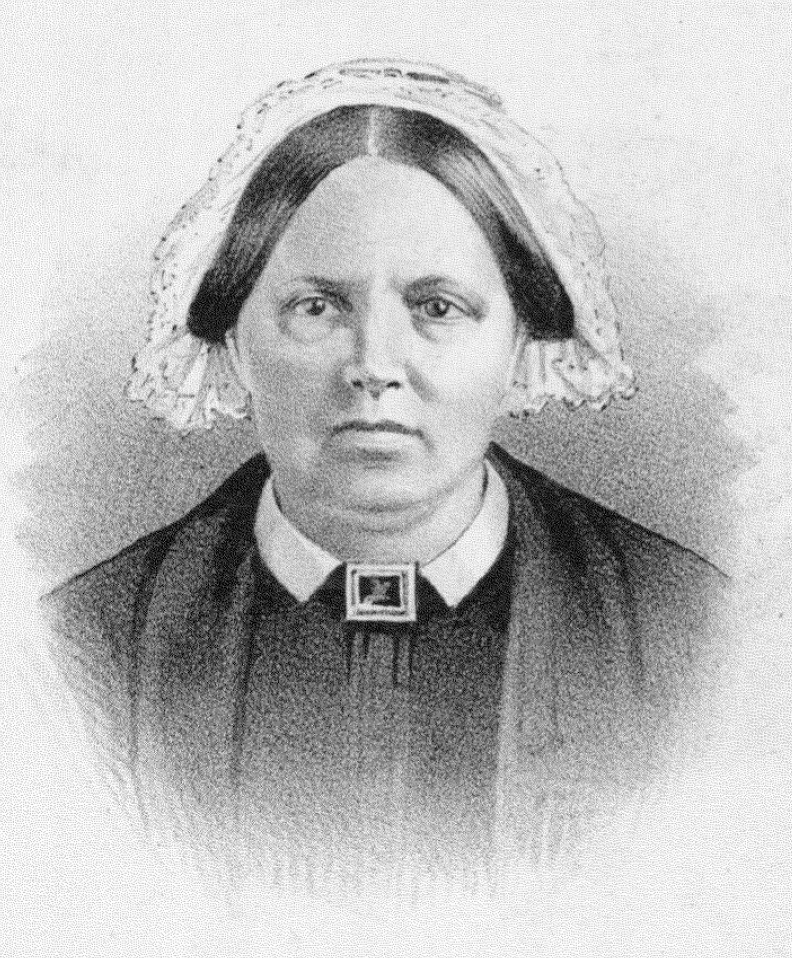
Rhoda Phelps Niles

Niles died on March 23, 1872.

=== Family ===
Niles and Rhoda Phelps were married on February 15, 1815, in Pittsfield, Massachusetts. They had three children: Julia Ann, Orange Jay, and George. Rhoda Niles died on August 7, 1864. George Johnson later returned to live in the family homestead beginning in 1870. Orange Johnson succeeded his father as postmaster in Troy.
