= Wayne County Commission =

Legislative organization

Type
- Type: Unicameral

Leadership
- Chair: Alisha Bell since 2019
- Vice Chair: Joseph Palamara since 2019
- Vice Chair Pro Tem: Sam Baydoun since 2021

Structure
- Seats: 15
- Political groups: Majority: Democratic (14); Minority: Republican (1)
- Length of term: 4 years (2 years prior to 2025)

Elections
- Last election: 2024
- Next election: 2028

Meeting place
- Guardian Building; 500 Griswold Street Mezzanine Level Detroit, Michigan

Website
- Commission website

The Wayne County Commission is the legislative body for Wayne County, Michigan. It is made up of 15 commissioners elected by district every four years. Wayne County, which includes the City of Detroit, is the most populous county in Michigan with roughly 1.8 million residents. The Wayne County Commission and its employees are the legislative branch of county government. The chief role of the commission is to adopt a budget and to enact ordinances. The commission also approves contracts, appointments and rules. The money is spent and ordinances are enforced through the administrative branch.

All Wayne County Commission meetings, as well as the budget sessions, are open to the public. The commission meets on the first and the third Thursday of the month at 10:00 a.m. in its chambers on the mezzanine level of the Guardian Building, 500 Griswold, Detroit. Meeting dates and agendas are published on the Commission website.

In addition to the full body, the Commission has eight standing committees, along with special committees and task forces. Standing committees include: Audit; Economic Development; Government Operations; Health & Human Services; Public Safety, Judiciary & Homeland Security; Public Services, Senior Citizens and Veterans Affairs and Ways and Means. Special committees includes those on Rules, which meets during the first month of each new commission term to set procedures for commission meetings, as well as and the Special Committee on the Criminal Justice Complex, which oversees the county jail and courthouse complex which opened in 2024.

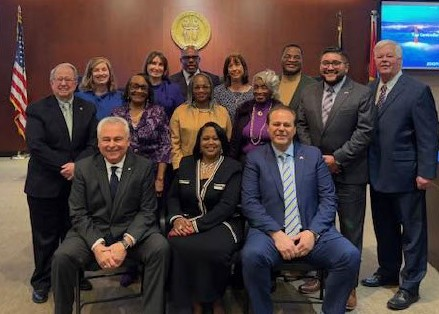
Wayne County Commission Members (2025)

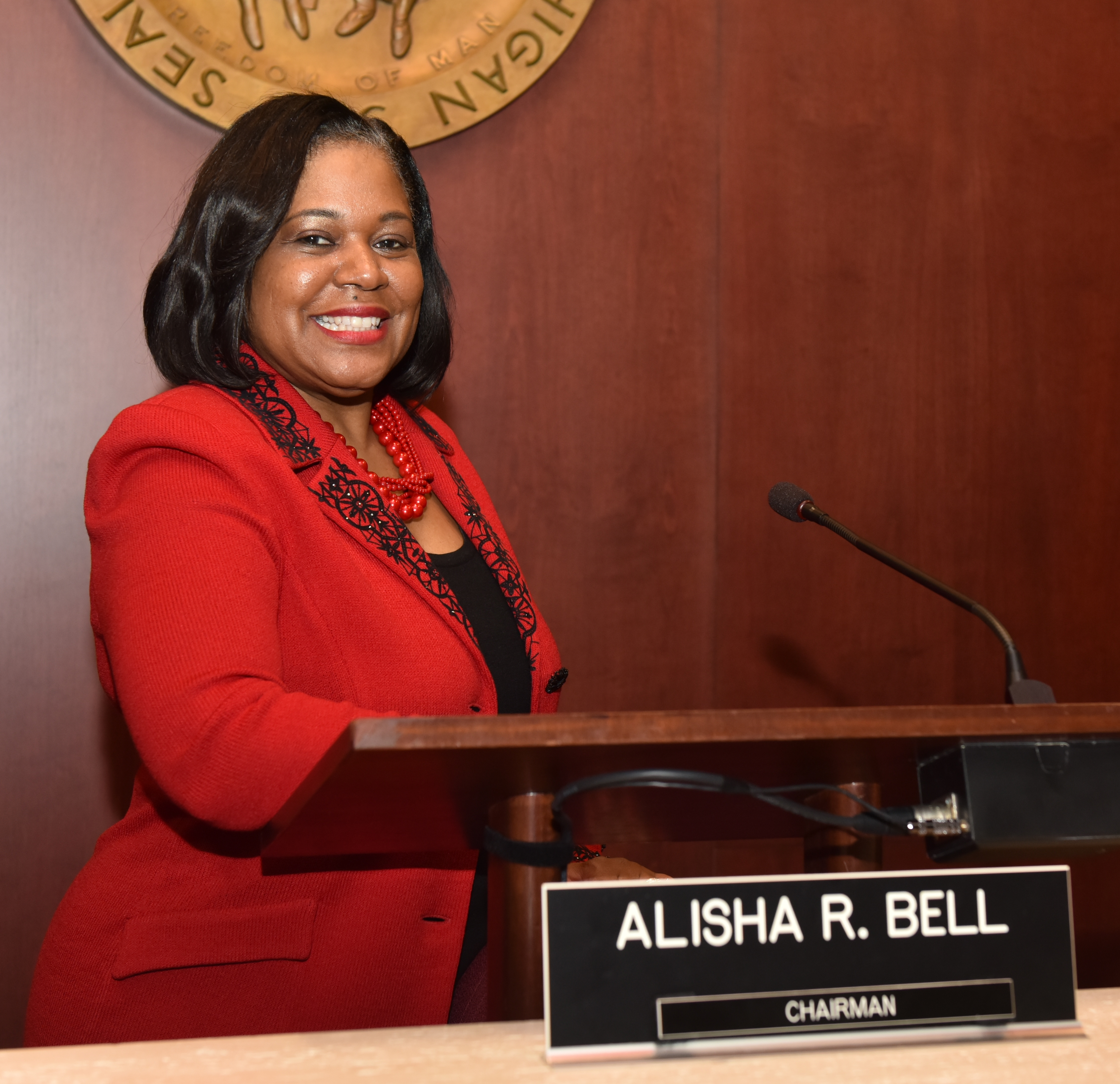
Wayne County Commission Chair Alisha Bell.

== List of Commissioners ==
This is a list of current Wayne County Commissioners in order by district. The 2025–2028 makeup of the commission is:

District	Communities included	Commissioner	Party	Residence	Since
1	Grosse Pointe, Grosse Pointe Farms, Grosse Pointe Park, Grosse Pointe Shores, Grosse Pointe Woods, Harper Woods, Detroit	Tim Killeen	Democratic	Detroit	2007
2	Detroit	Jonathan Kinloch	Democratic	Detroit	2021
3	Hamtramck, Highland Park, and Detroit	Martha Scott	Democratic	Highland Park	2011
4	Ecorse, Lincoln Park, Melvindale, River Rouge, and Detroit	Cara Clemente	Democratic	Lincoln Park	2023
5	Detroit	Angelique Peterson-Mayberry	Democratic	Detroit	2023
6	Detroit and Redford Township	Monique Baker McCormick	Democratic	Detroit	2019
7	Detroit	Alisha Bell	Democratic	Detroit	2003
8	Dearborn Heights, Garden City, and Inkster	Hassan Ahmad	Democratic	Dearborn Heights	2026 (Note: Incumbent commissioner David Knezek resigned in July 2026. Ahmad was appointed to fill the vacancy.)
9	Plymouth Township, Northville, Northville Township, and Livonia	Terry Marecki	Republican	Livonia	2015
10	Plymouth, Plymouth Township, and Canton Township	Melissa Daub	Democratic	Canton Township	2019
11	Belleville, Flat Rock, Wayne, Sumpter Township, Van Buren Township, Huron Township, and Romulus	Allen Wilson	Democratic	Romulus	2015
12	Westland and Livonia	Glenn Anderson	Democratic	Westland	2016
13	Dearborn and Allen Park	Sam Baydoun	Democratic	Dearborn	2019
14	Taylor, Brownstown Township, Woodhaven, Gibraltar, and Rockwood	Alex Garza	Democratic	Taylor	2024
15	Allen Park, Grosse Ile Township, Riverview, Southgate, Trenton, and Wyandotte	Joseph Palamara	Democratic	Grosse Ile Township	1999
