= Rashida Tlaib =

American politician and lawyer (born 1976)

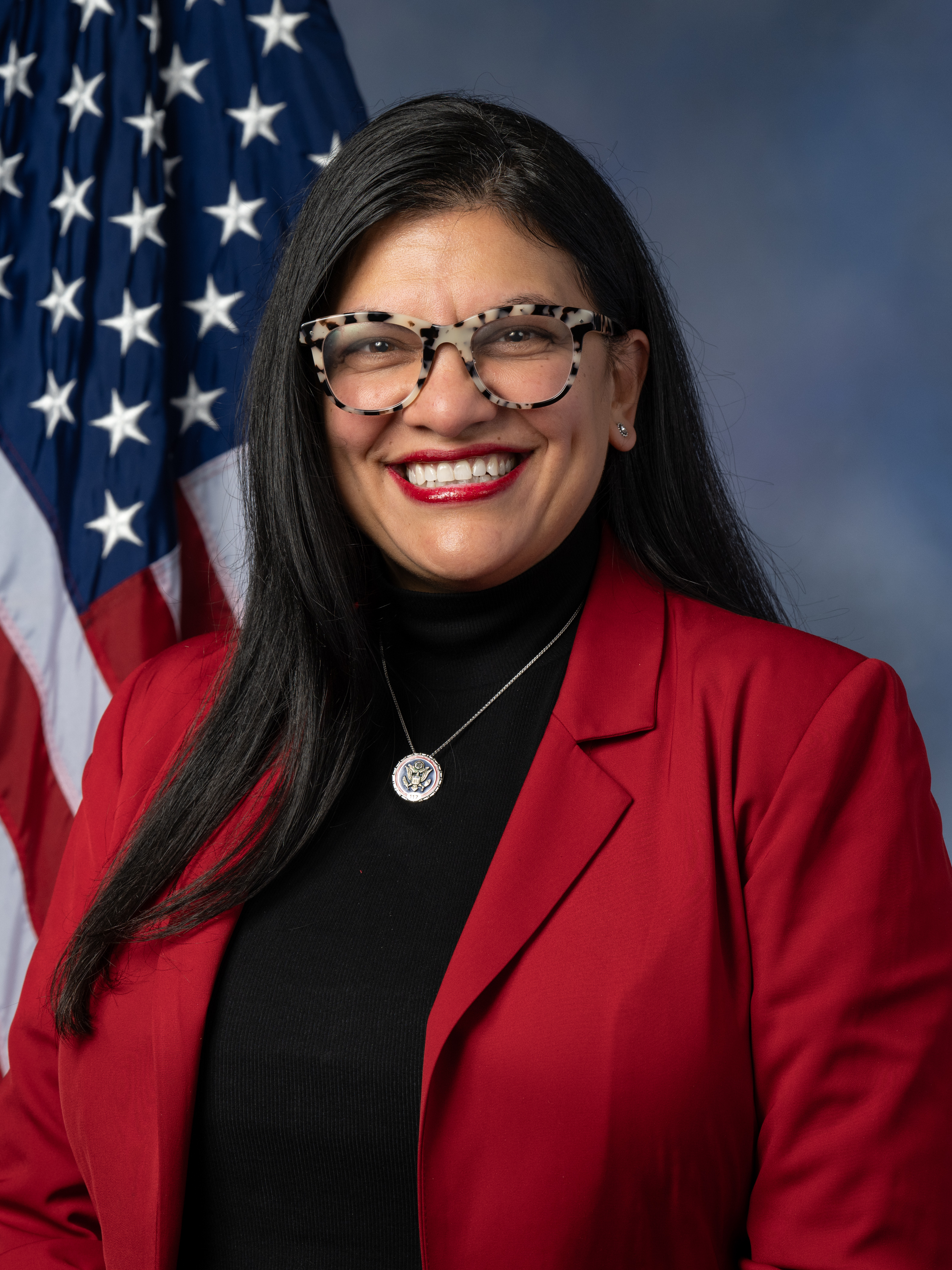
- Official portrait, 2024

Member of the U.S. House of Representatives from Michigan
- Incumbent
- Assumed office January 3, 2019
- Preceded by: Brenda Jones
- Constituency: 13th district (2019–2023); 12th district (2023–present)

Member of the Michigan House of Representatives
- In office January 1, 2009 – December 31, 2014
- Preceded by: Steve Tobocman
- Succeeded by: Stephanie Chang
- Constituency: 12th district (2009–2012); 6th district (2013–2014)

Personal details
- Born: Rashida Harbi Elabed; July 24, 1976 (age 50) Detroit, Michigan, U.S.
- Party: Democratic
- Other political affiliations: Democratic Socialists of America
- Spouse: Fayez Tlaib (m. 1998; div. 2015)
- Children: 2
- Education: Wayne State University (BA); Thomas M. Cooley Law School (JD)
- Website: House website Campaign website
- Tlaib's voice Tlaib at the 2019 MPAC conference Recorded November 2019

Rashida Harbi Tlaib (Note: /təˈliːb/ tə-LEEB Arabic: رشيدة حربي طليب, romanized: Rashīdah Ḥarbī Ṭulayyib) (née Elabed; born July 24, 1976) is an American lawyer and politician serving as a U.S. representative from Michigan since 2019, representing the state's 12th congressional district since 2023. A member of the Democratic Party, she is the first Palestinian American woman to serve in Congress and one of the first two Muslim women (along with Ilhan Omar) elected to Congress.

Tlaib was born to working-class Palestinian immigrants in Detroit in 1976 and is the oldest of 14 children. She graduated from Southwestern High School in Detroit in 1994, from Wayne State University with a Bachelor of Arts degree in political science in 1998, and from Thomas M. Cooley Law School with a Juris Doctor in 2004. She was admitted to the bar in the state of Michigan in 2007.

Tlaib's political career began in 2004, when she interned with State Representative Steve Tobocman, who hired her to his staff when he became majority floor leader in 2007. He encouraged her to run for his seat the next year. She did so, and won the 2008 election, becoming the first Muslim woman to serve in the state legislature. Tlaib represented the 6th and 12th districts in the Michigan House of Representatives.

In 2018, Tlaib won the Democratic nomination and the general election for the United States House of Representatives in Michigan's 13th congressional district. She and Alexandria Ocasio-Cortez are the first female members of Democratic Socialists of America to serve in Congress. Tlaib is a member of The Squad, an informal group of U.S. representatives on the left wing of the Democratic Party.

As a U.S. representative, Tlaib has been a vocal critic of both the Trump and Biden administrations. She has argued in favor of abolishing U.S. Immigration and Customs Enforcement and voted to impeach President Donald Trump in both 2019 and 2021. Tlaib has been sharply critical of Israel, viewing it as an apartheid state. She has called for an end to U.S. aid to Israel; she supports the Boycott, Divestment and Sanctions movement and a one-state solution to the Israeli–Palestinian conflict. On November 7, 2023, Tlaib was censured by the House of Representatives in response to her public statements following the October 7 attacks on Israel. She has criticized U.S. support of Israel in the Gaza war.

== Early life and education ==
Rashida Harbi Elabed (Note: In this Arabic-American name, Rashida is her given name, Harbi is her patronymic middle name, Elabed (also spelled Alabed, El-Abed, and Al-Abed) is her maiden surname, and Tlaib is her married surname.) was born in Detroit on July 24, 1976, the eldest of 14 children born to working-class Palestinian immigrants. Her mother, Fatima Elabed (née Tlaib), was born in Beit Ur al-Fauqa, near the West Bank city of Ramallah. Her father, Harbi Ahmad Elabed, was born in Beit Hanina, a neighborhood in East Jerusalem. He moved first to Nicaragua, then to Detroit. He worked on an assembly line in a Ford Motor Company plant. As the eldest, Tlaib played a role in raising her siblings while her parents worked.

Tlaib attended elementary school at Harms, Bennett Elementary, and Phoenix Academy. She graduated from Southwestern High School in Southwest Detroit in 1994. Tlaib received a Bachelor of Arts degree in political science from Wayne State University in 1998 and her Juris Doctor from Thomas M. Cooley Law School in 2004. Tlaib was admitted to the bar in the state of Michigan in 2007.

== Michigan House of Representatives ==
Tlaib began her political career in 2004 when she interned with State Representative Steve Tobocman. When Tobocman became Majority Floor Leader in 2007, he hired Tlaib to his staff. In 2008 Tobocman encouraged Tlaib to run for his seat, which he was vacating due to term limits. The urban district is 40% Hispanic, 25% African-American, 30% non-Hispanic white Americans, and 2% Arab American. Tlaib faced a crowded primary that included several Latinos, including former State Representative Belda Garza. She emerged victorious, carrying 44% of the vote in the eight-way Democratic primary and winning the general election with over 90% of the vote.

In 2010, Tlaib faced a primary election challenge from Jim Czachorowski in his first bid for office. Tlaib picked up 85% of the vote to Czachorowski's 15%, and won the general election with 92% of the vote against Republican challenger Darrin Daigle.

In 2012, Tlaib won reelection to the Michigan House in the newly redrawn 6th district. Tlaib faced fellow incumbent Maureen Stapleton in the Democratic primary and defeated her, 52%–45%. She won the general election with 92% of the vote against Republican nominee Darrin Daigle. Tlaib could not run for the Michigan House a fourth time in 2014 because of term limits; instead, she ran for the Michigan Senate, losing to incumbent Senator Virgil Smith Jr. in the 2014 Democratic primary, 50%–42%.

Tlaib is the first Muslim woman to serve as a member of the Michigan State Legislature. She is also the second Muslim woman (after Jamilah Nasheed of Missouri) to serve in a state legislature nationwide.

After leaving the state legislature, Tlaib worked at Sugar Law Center, a Detroit nonprofit that provides free legal representation for workers.

== U.S. House of Representatives ==
=== Elections ===
==== 2018 special ====
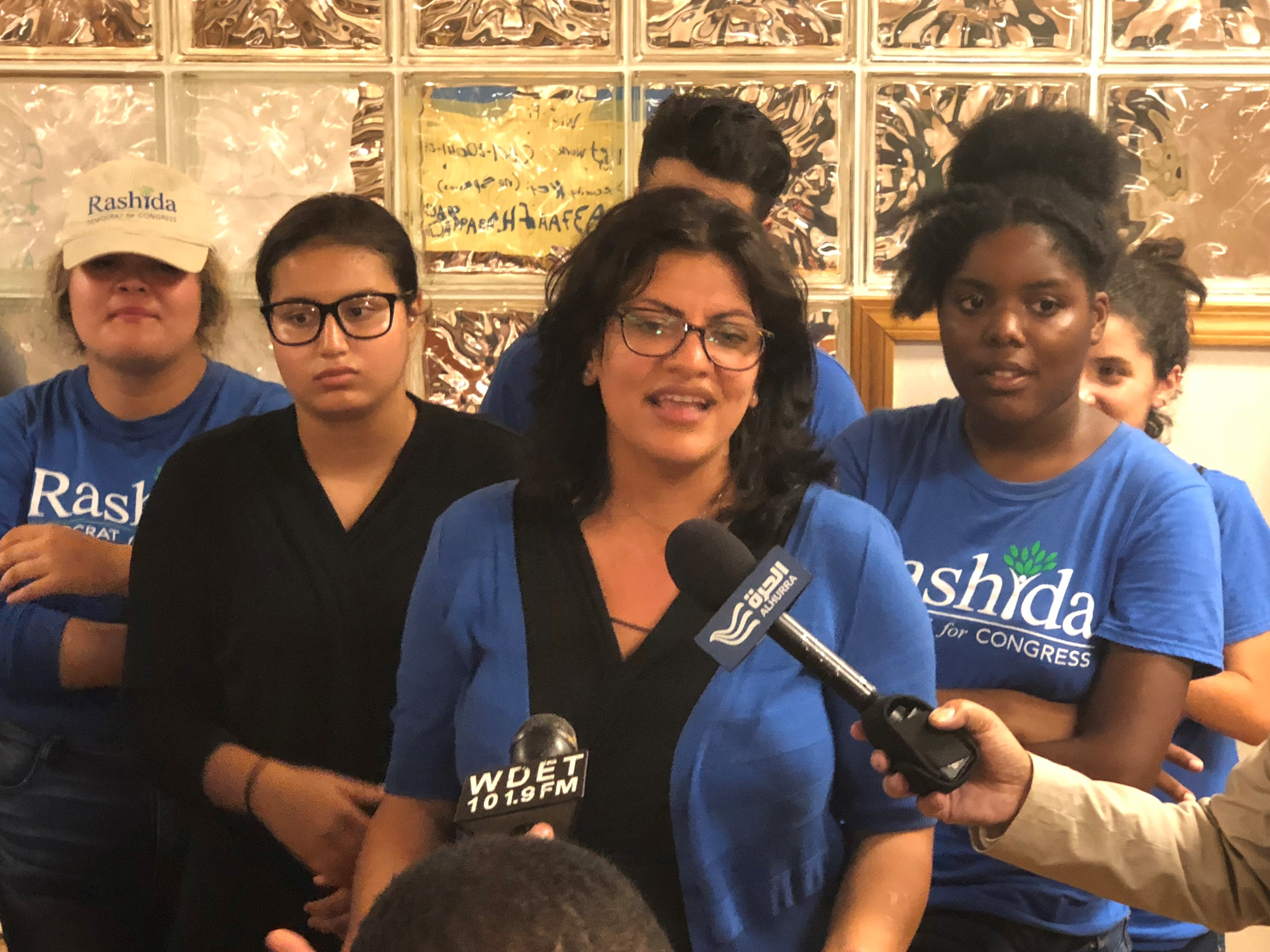
Tlaib at her campaign headquarters, 2018

In 2018, Tlaib announced her candidacy for the U.S. House of Representatives in Michigan's 13th congressional district. Longtime Representative John Conyers had resigned from Congress in December 2017 due to a sexual harassment scandal. Tlaib filed in both the Democratic primary in the special election for the balance of Conyers's 27th term and in the general election for a full two-year term.

As of July 16, 2018, Tlaib had raised $893,030 in funds, more than her five opponents in the August 7 Democratic primary. Tlaib, as a member of the Justice Democrats, made a guest appearance on the political interview show Rebel HQ of the progressive media network The Young Turks (TYT).

In the Democratic primary for the special election, Tlaib finished second to Detroit City Council president Brenda Jones, who received 32,727 votes (37.7% of the total) to Tlaib's 31,084 (35.9%). Bill Wild, mayor of Westland, received 13,152 votes (15.2%) and Ian Conyers, the great-nephew of former Congressman Conyers, took fourth with 9,740 (11.2%).

==== 2018 general ====
In the Democratic primary for the general election, Tlaib defeated five other candidates. She received 27,803 votes, or 31.2%.

Tlaib faced no major-party opposition in the November 2018 general election, although Brenda Jones mounted an eleventh-hour write-in bid. On Election Day, Tlaib became the first Palestinian-American woman to be elected to Congress.

==== 2020 ====
Brenda Jones challenged Tlaib in the 2020 Democratic primary. Tlaib won, 66%–34%, spending over $2,000,000 in campaign funds to Jones's $140,000.

==== 2022 ====
In 2022, following redistricting, Tlaib sought reelection in Michigan's newly drawn 12th congressional district. She won the Democratic primary with 64% of the vote over three challengers, and the general election with 71% of the vote over Republican Steven Elliott and Gary Walkowicz of the Working Class Party.

==== 2024 ====
In 2024, Tlaib was unopposed in the Democratic primary. In the general election she won a third term in Congress with over 69% of the vote, defeating Republican nominee James Hooper (25.4%), Green Party nominee Brenda K. Sanders (2.3%), and Working Class Party nominee Gary Walkowicz (2.6%).

=== Tenure ===
Along with fellow Democrat Ilhan Omar of Minnesota, Tlaib is one of the first two Muslim women to serve in Congress. She took the congressional oath of office on January 3, 2019, swearing in on an English-language translation of the Quran. She wore a thawb (thobe), a traditional embroidered Arab dress, to the swearing-in ceremony. This inspired a number of Palestinian and Palestinian-American women to share pictures on social media with the hashtag #TweetYourThobe.

==== Ban from entering Israel ====
On August 15, 2019, Israel announced that Tlaib and her colleague Ilhan Omar would be denied entry into the country. According to The Times of Israel, Deputy Israeli Foreign Minister Tzipi Hotovely said Israel would not "allow those who deny our right to exist in this world to enter" and called it a "very justified decision". It was reported that President Trump had pressed Benjamin Netanyahu's government to make such a decision. The next day, Israeli authorities granted a request by Tlaib to visit her relatives in the Israeli-occupied West Bank on humanitarian grounds and under certain restrictions on political statements. Tlaib declined to go, saying that she did not want to make the trip "under these oppressive conditions". The Israeli interior ministry stated that Tlaib had previously agreed to abide by any rules their government had set in exchange for being permitted to visit the country, and accused her of making a "provocative request aimed at bashing the State of Israel".

==== Campaign finance investigation ====
On November 14, 2019, the House Ethics Committee announced that it was investigating whether Tlaib used congressional campaign money for personal expenses in violation of House rules. In August 2020 the committee directed Tlaib to reimburse her campaign $10,800, stating that Tlaib has an "obligation to act in accordance with the strict technical requirements of federal campaign laws and regulations, including the restrictions on personal use of campaign funds".

==== Censure ====
On October 26, 2023, Representative Marjorie Taylor Greene proposed H.Res 829, which would have censured Tlaib for her criticism of Israel and for "leading an insurrection" after she participated in a protest at the Capitol. The resolution did not pass, with all Democrats and nearly two dozen Republicans voting against it over concerns that the language was "too incendiary". Tlaib called the resolution "deeply Islamophobic" and said it attacked "peaceful Jewish anti-war advocates".

On November 6, Tlaib issued a press release regarding Republicans' proposed censure resolutions against her. Tlaib said the proposed censure resolutions distorted her positions and were "filled with obvious lies". She added that she had "repeatedly denounced the horrific targeting and killing of civilians by Hamas and the Israeli government" and that she supported a ceasefire to end the conflict. Tlaib said the phrase "from the river to the sea" was "an aspirational call for freedom, human rights and peaceful coexistence, not death, destruction or hate."

The House of Representatives censured Tlaib on November 7, 2023. Representative Rich McCormick's censure resolution (H.Res 845) accused her of "promoting false narratives regarding the October 7, 2023, Hamas attack on Israel and for calling for the destruction of the state of Israel." The resolution stated that the phrase "from the river to the sea" is "a genocidal call to violence to destroy the state of Israel and its people to replace it with a Palestinian state extending from the Jordan River to the Mediterranean Sea". 212 Republicans and 22 Democrats voted for the resolution, and 188 representatives (184 Democrats and four Republicans) against it. During the debate on the House floor, Tlaib said that she wanted a ceasefire and "The cries of the Palestinian and Israeli children sound no different to me". Representative Brad Schneider said that Tlaib was "trying to gaslight the world" by defending the "river to the sea" slogan and voted for the resolution, while Representative Ken Buck argued that it was not Congress's job "to censure somebody because we don't agree with them".

On November 8, White House Press Secretary Karine Jean-Pierre condemned Tlaib's use of the slogan "from the river to the sea".

==== 2024 ====
In September 2024, several politicians and media figures, including Michigan Attorney General Dana Nessel, CNN personality Jake Tapper, Michigan State Senator Jeremy Moss, and Anti-Defamation League CEO Jonathan Greenblatt, criticized Tlaib for allegedly saying or insinuating that Nessel was prosecuting pro-Palestinian protesters because she is Jewish. A fact check by the Detroit Metro Times found that Tlaib never mentioned that Nessel is Jewish.

=== Committee assignments ===
- Committee on Financial Services
  - Subcommittee on Diversity and Inclusion
  - Subcommittee on Oversight and Investigations
- Committee on Natural Resources
  - Subcommittee on National Parks, Forests and Public Lands
- Committee on Oversight and Reform
  - Subcommittee on Civil Rights and Civil Liberties
  - Subcommittee on Environment

=== Caucus memberships ===
- Black Maternal Health Caucus
- Congressional Equality Caucus
- Congressional Progressive Caucus
- Congressional Freethought Caucus
- Congressional Caucus for the Equal Rights Amendment
- Rare Disease Caucus

== Political positions ==
Tlaib, a member of the Democratic Socialists of America, aligns with the left wing of the Democratic Party.

=== Foreign policy ===
==== Israeli–Palestinian conflict ====
Tlaib has said she opposes providing aid to a "Netanyahu Israel" and supported the Palestinian right of return and a one-state solution. In 2018, J Street, a mainstream pro-Israel Jewish organization, withdrew its endorsement of Tlaib due to her support for a one-state solution. J Street said she had misled it about her views on the issue during her primary campaign. Responding to criticism, Tlaib elaborated by saying that she believed a two-state solution under Benjamin Netanyahu's government was not possible without harming the Israeli people. Tlaib is one of the few members of Congress to openly support the Boycott, Divestment and Sanctions (BDS) movement against the Israeli government. She has defended her support of the boycott on free speech grounds and as a response to Israel's military occupation of the West Bank and settlement building, which the international community considers illegal under international law, though Israel disputes this.

In January 2019, Tlaib criticized anti-BDS legislation proposed by Senators Marco Rubio and Jim Risch. She argued that boycotting is a right and that Rubio and Risch "forgot what country they represent". Tlaib's comments were criticized by several groups, including the Anti-Defamation League (ADL), which said, "Though the legislation discussed is sponsored by four non-Jewish Senators, any charge of dual loyalty has special sensitivity and resonance for Jews, particularly in an environment of rising anti-Semitism." Tlaib responded that her comments were directed at Rubio and Risch, not the Jewish American community. She was one of 17 members of Congress to vote against a July 2019 House resolution condemning the BDS movement, which passed by a margin of 381 votes. Tlaib suggested boycotting HBO host Bill Maher after he denounced the BDS movement.

In December 2020, Tlaib deleted a retweet she had posted a few days earlier, on the International Day of Solidarity with the Palestinian People, containing the phrase "from the river to the sea".

On September 23, 2021, Tlaib called Israel an "apartheid state" on the House floor during a debate over funding for Israel's "Iron Dome" air defense system; Representative Ted Deutch responded by accusing Tlaib of antisemitism.

In 2022 and 2023, Tlaib introduced resolutions aimed at recognizing the Nakba that stated that "a just and lasting peace cannot be established without addressing the Nakba and remedying its injustices towards the Palestinian people" and endorsed the Palestinian right of return. The resolutions resulted in criticism from Senators Rosen and Kennedy, who said that calling the "establishment of the only Jewish state a 'catastrophe' is deeply offensive" and that "the Capitol grounds should not be a pedestal to legitimize anti-Semitic bigotry". Tlaib responded the criticism by noting that organizations such as Amnesty International and Human Rights Watch had concluded that Israel has imposed a system of apartheid on Palestinians.

On July 18, 2023, Tlaib and eight other progressive Democrats (Alexandria Ocasio-Cortez, Cori Bush, Jamaal Bowman, André Carson, Summer Lee, Ilhan Omar, Ayanna Pressley, and Delia Ramirez) voted against a congressional non-binding resolution proposed by August Pfluger that "the State of Israel is not a racist or apartheid state", that Congress rejects "all forms of antisemitism and xenophobia", and that "the United States will always be a staunch partner and supporter of Israel".

===== Gaza war =====
During the Gaza war, Tlaib released a statement grieving the loss of both Israeli and Palestinian life, saying the only way to end the cycle of violence was to "dismantle" the apartheid system in place, and calling for the end of unconditional U.S. support for Israel. Her statement was condemned by two representatives and the Israeli ambassador to the U.S. Tlaib repeatedly condemned Hamas's October 2023 attack on Israel. During the war, she has been the member of Congress most vehemently calling for a ceasefire. She has said that her criticism of Israel has always been directed at its government and its leadership under Netanyahu, saying: "It is important to separate people and governments. No government is beyond criticism. The idea that criticizing the government of Israel is antisemitic sets a very dangerous precedent, and it’s been used to silence diverse voices speaking up for human rights across our nation."

Tlaib criticized the United States' support for the Israeli bombing of the Gaza Strip that killed thousands of Palestinian civilians in Gaza, and accused President Biden of supporting the alleged genocide of the Palestinian people. On November 3, 2023, she tweeted an antiwar video, writing, ".@POTUS, the majority of the American people are not with you on this one. #CeasefireNow." The video ended with the words "Joe Biden supported the genocide of the Palestinian people. The American people won't forget. Biden, support a ceasefire now or don't count on us in 2024". The thread ended with the tweet, "From the river to the sea is an aspirational call for freedom, human rights, and peaceful coexistence, not death, destruction, or hate. My work and advocacy is always centered in justice and dignity for all people no matter faith or ethnicity."

Tlaib called for sanctions and an arms embargo against Israel after the March 2025 Israeli attacks on the Gaza Strip.

In November 2025, Tlaib introduced a resolution, co-sponsored by 20 other Democratic representatives, to recognize that "Israel has committed the crime of genocide against the Palestinian people in Gaza."

In June 2026, Tlaib introduced a measure to halt U.S. support for Israel in the 2026 Lebanon war.

In September 2026, Tlaib called on the US government to end what she called its "complicity" in Israel's military actions across the Gaza Strip. Her remarks came after reports emerged of an Israeli raid on a kindergarten in Gaza, where approximately 200 children were reportedly trapped inside the facility under active gunfire. In a post on X, Tlaib wrote, "the genocide is still happening" and "there was never a ceasefire". She asserted that minors continue to bear the brunt of military operations, writing that children are "being killed with American made bombs, and those that live are traumatized forever." Tlaib concluded that the administration "must end its complicity in these atrocious acts of ethnic cleansing."

==== Wars in Syria and Yemen ====
Tlaib has criticized Saudi Arabia's human rights violations and the Saudi Arabian-led intervention in Yemen.

In 2023, Tlaib was among 56 Democrats to vote for H.Con.Res. 21, which directed President Biden to remove U.S. troops from Syria within 180 days.

=== Domestic policy ===
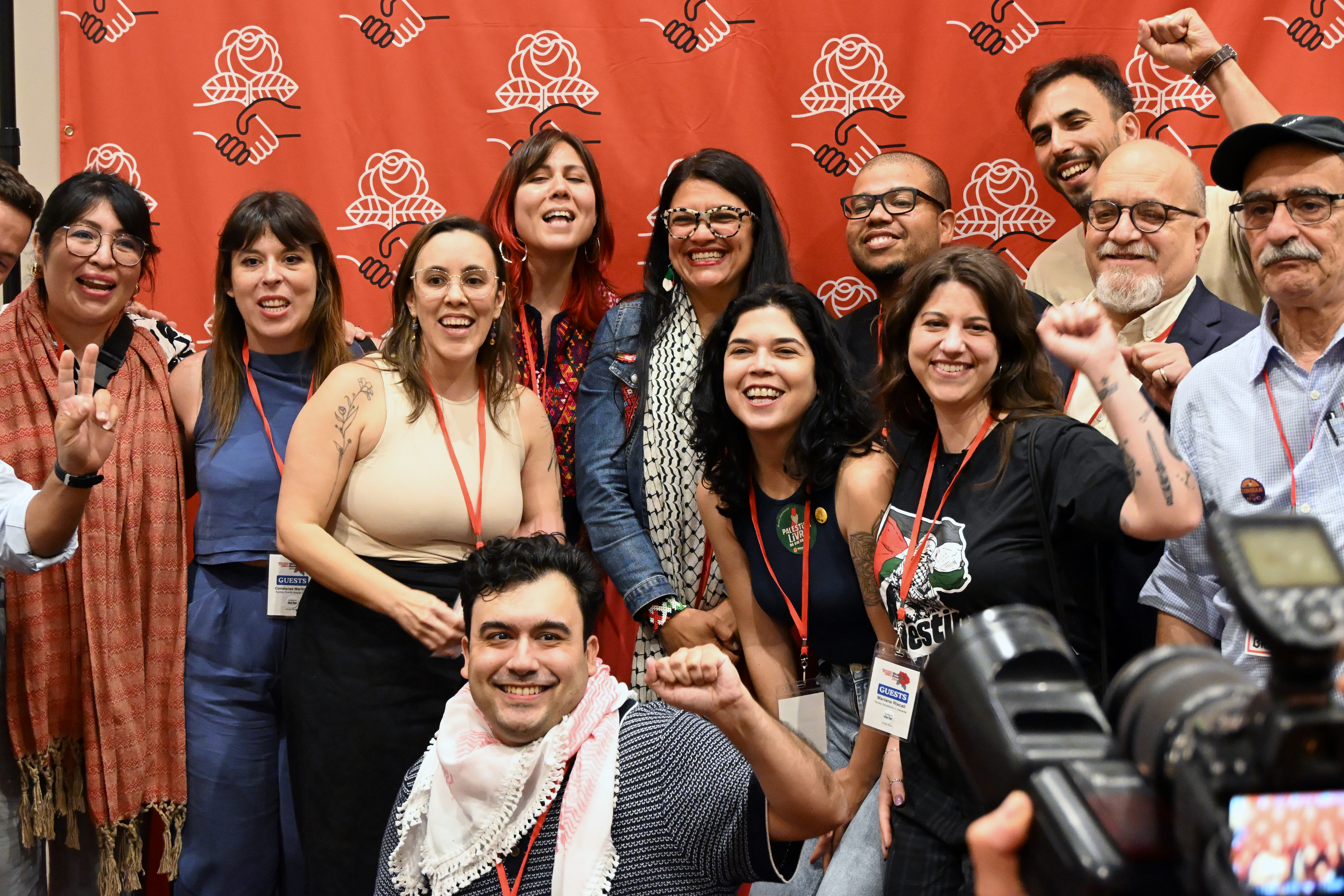
Tlaib with Latin American socialists and activists at the 2025 Democratic Socialists of America national convention

Tlaib supports domestic reforms, including Medicare for All and a $18 to $20 hourly minimum wage. On November 5, 2021, she was one of six House Democrats to break with their party and vote against the Infrastructure Investment and Jobs Act because it was decoupled from the social safety net provisions in the Build Back Better Act.

==== Abortion ====
Tlaib supports abortion rights and has criticized what she called "white men trying to force women to not have the right to seek legal abortions". She was endorsed by the abortion rights organization NARAL.

==== Drug law reform ====
Tlaib supports the descheduling of cannabis and has supported the MORE Act, which would deschedule the substance, expunge cannabis convictions, and implement various social reforms aimed at addressing communities impacted by the war on drugs.

==== Immigration ====
Tlaib was an early supporter of the movement to abolish the Immigration and Customs Enforcement agency. In June 2019 she was one of four Democratic representatives to vote against the Emergency Supplemental Appropriations for Humanitarian Assistance and Security at the Southern Border Act, a $4.5 billion border funding bill that required Customs and Border Protection enact health standards for individuals in custody such as forming standards for individuals for "medical emergencies; nutrition, hygiene, and facilities; and personnel training."

==== Police killings ====
Following the killing of Daunte Wright, Tlaib called American policing "inherently and intentionally racist", saying, "No more policing, incarceration, and militarization. It can't be reformed." In 2023, Tlaib and Congresswoman Cori Bush were the only two representatives to vote against a resolution recognizing National Police Week.

=== Impeachments of Donald Trump ===
Tlaib supported the efforts to impeach President Trump. In August 2016, she protested a speech Trump gave at Cobo Center and was ejected from the venue. On her first day in Congress, January 3, 2019, she published an op-ed with John Bonifaz in which she argued that it was not necessary to wait for Special Counsel Robert Mueller to complete his criminal investigation before proceeding with impeachment.

Later that day, Tlaib spoke at a reception for the MoveOn campaign, recounting a conversation with her son in which she expressed her resolve to "impeach the motherfucker". Trump retorted that her comments were "highly disrespectful to the United States of America".

In a radio interview with Mehdi Hasan of The Intercept, Tlaib reiterated her call for Trump's impeachment.

Tlaib voted for the second impeachment of Donald Trump after the January 6 United States Capitol attack.

== Personal life ==
In 1998, at the age of 22, Tlaib married Fayez Tlaib. They have two sons. The couple has since divorced. In 2018, a campaign spokesperson referred to Tlaib as a single mother.

In September 2018, The New York Times reported that Tlaib walked into her family's mosque to express her gratitude for the opportunity to run for Congress, articulating a belief that "my Allah is She". The Detroit Free Press reported that, although she recognizes that some in her faith community consider her not "Muslim enough", she believes that Allah understands that she deems her actions "reflective of Islam".

== Electoral history ==
2018 Michigan's 13th congressional district special election
Primary election
| Party | Candidate | Votes | % |
|---|---|---|---|
| Democratic | Brenda Jones | 32,769 | 37.8 |
| Democratic | Rashida Tlaib | 31,121 | 35.8 |
| Democratic | Bill Wild | 13,174 | 15.2 |
| Democratic | Ian Conyers | 9,749 | 11.2 |
| Democratic | Clyde Darnell Lynch (write-in) | 2 | 0.0 |
| Total votes | | 86,815 | 100.0 |

2018 Michigan's 13th congressional district regular election
Primary election
| Party | Candidate | Votes | % |
|---|---|---|---|
| Democratic | Rashida Tlaib | 27,841 | 31.2 |
| Democratic | Brenda Jones | 26,941 | 30.2 |
| Democratic | Bill Wild | 12,613 | 14.1 |
| Democratic | Coleman Young II | 11,172 | 12.5 |
| Democratic | Ian Conyers | 5,866 | 6.6 |
| Democratic | Shanelle Jackson | 4,853 | 5.4 |
| Democratic | Kimberly Hill Knott (write-in) | 33 | 0.0 |
| Democratic | Royce Kinniebrew (write-in) | 2 | 0.0 |
| Total votes | | 89,321 | 100.0 |
General election
| Democratic | Rashida Tlaib | 165,355 | 84.2 |
| Working Class | Sam Johnson | 22,186 | 11.3 |
| Green | D. Etta Wilcoxon | 7,980 | 4.1 |
| Independent | Brenda Jones (write-in) | 633 | 0.3 |
| N/A | Other write-ins | 145 | 0.1 |
| Total votes | | 196,299 | 100.0 |
| Democratic hold | | | |

2020 Michigan's 13th congressional district election
Primary election
| Party | Candidate | Votes | % |
|---|---|---|---|
| Democratic | Rashida Tlaib (incumbent) | 71,703 | 66.3 |
| Democratic | Brenda Jones | 36,493 | 33.7 |
| Total votes | | 108,196 | 100.0 |
General election
| Democratic | Rashida Tlaib (incumbent) | 223,205 | 78.1 |
| Republican | David Dudenhoefer | 53,311 | 18.7 |
| Working Class | Sam Johnson | 5,284 | 1.8 |
| Green | D. Etta Wilcoxon | 2,105 | 0.7 |
| U.S. Taxpayers' | Articia Bomer | 1,974 | 0.7 |
| Independent | Donald Eason (write-in) | 6 | 0.0 |
| Total votes | | 285,885 | 100.0 |
| Democratic hold | | | |

=== 2022 ===
Michigan's 12th congressional district, US House of Representatives, 2022
| Party | Candidate | Votes | % |
|---|---|---|---|
| Democratic | Rashida Tlaib (incumbent) | 196,643 | 70.8 |
| Republican | Steven Elliott | 72,888 | 26.2 |
| Working Class | Gary Walkowicz | 8,046 | 2.9 |
| Total votes | | 277,577 | 100.0 |
| Democratic hold | | | |

=== 2024 ===
Michigan's 12th congressional district, U.S. House of Representatives, 2024
| Party | Candidate | Votes | % |
|---|---|---|---|
| Democratic | Rashida Tlaib (incumbent) | 253,354 | 69.7 |
| Republican | James Hooper | 92,490 | 25.4 |
| Working Class | Gary Walkowicz | 9,401 | 2.6 |
| Green | Brenda K. Sanders | 8,254 | 2.3 |
| Total votes | | 363,499 | 100.0 |
| Democratic hold | | | |

== See also ==
- List of Arab and Middle Eastern Americans in the United States Congress
- List of Democratic Socialists of America public officeholders
- List of Muslim members of the United States Congress
- The Squad (United States Congress)
- Women in the United States House of Representatives
- List of United States representatives expelled, censured, or reprimanded

== Notes ==
U.S. House of Representatives
| Preceded by Brenda Jones | Member of the U.S. House Representatives from Michigan's 13th congressional district 2019–2023 | Succeeded by Shri Thanedar |
| Preceded by Debbie Dingell | Member of the U.S. House Representatives from Michigan's 12th congressional district 2023–present | Incumbent |
U.S. order of precedence (ceremonial)
| Preceded by William Timmons | United States representatives by seniority 231st | Succeeded by Lori Trahan |
