= Roseville, Michigan =

- City
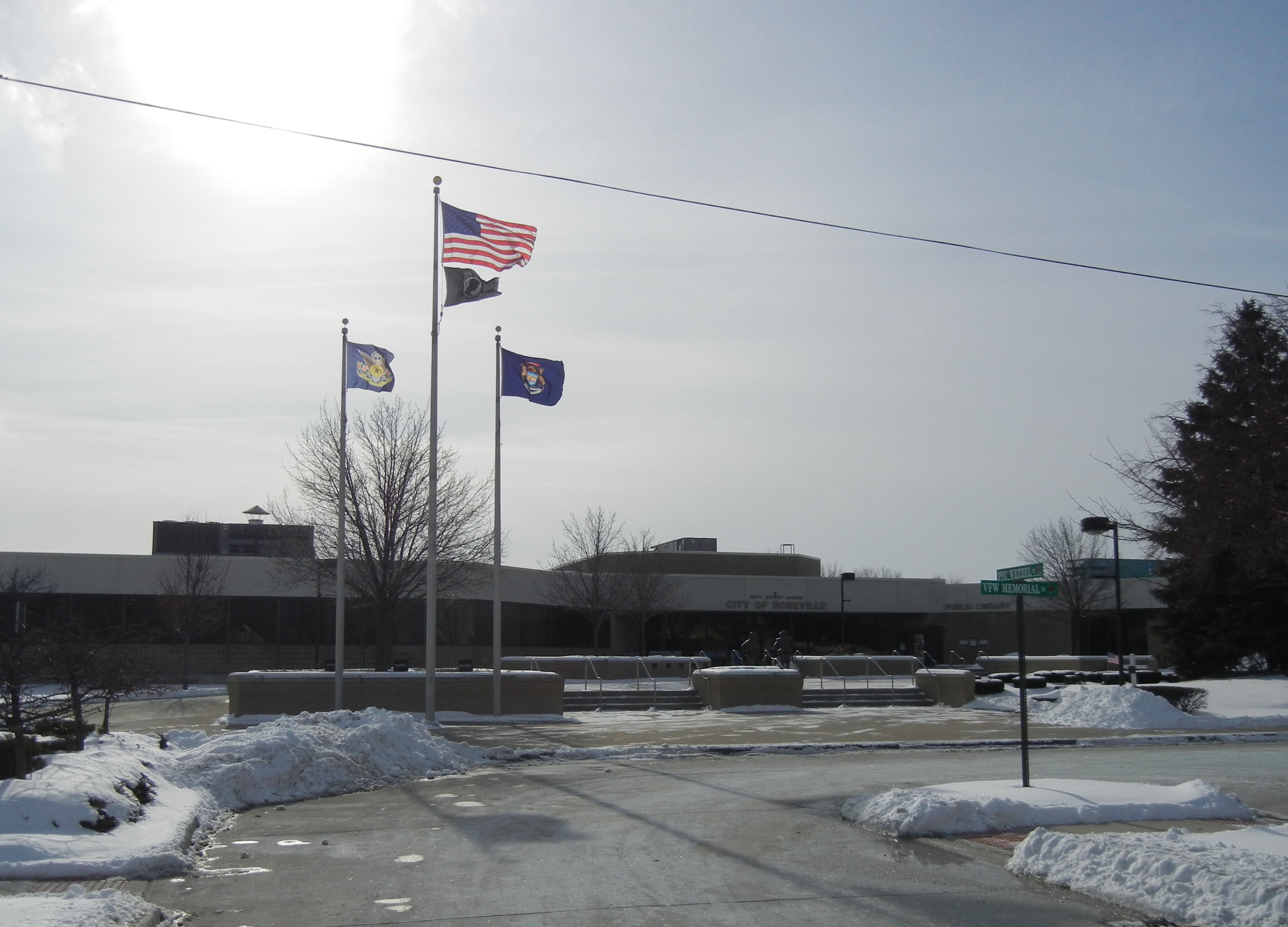
- Roseville City Hall

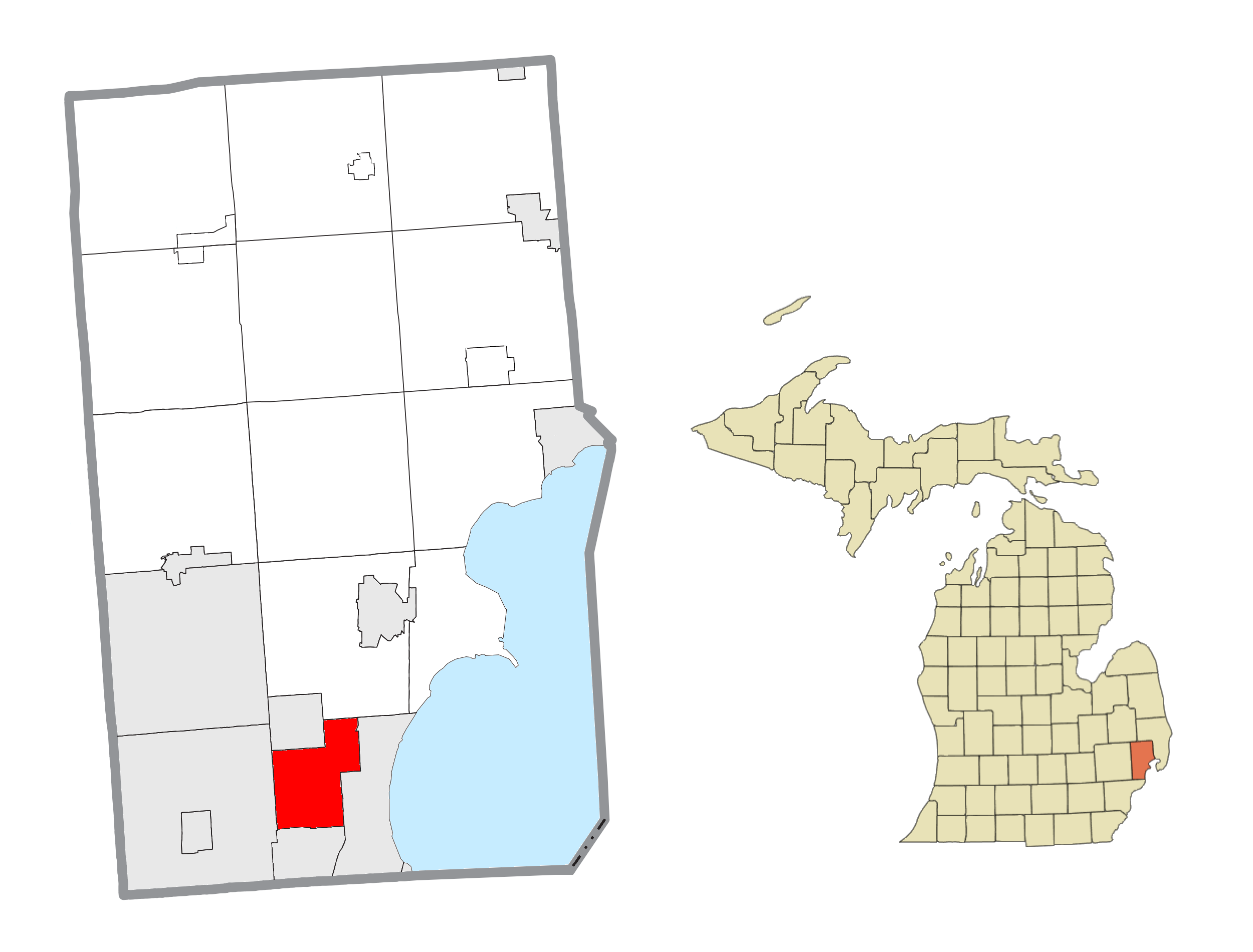
- Location within Macomb County

- Location within Michigan Location within the United States
- Coordinates: 42°30′12″N 82°56′19″W
- Country: United States
- State: Michigan
- County: Macomb
- Incorporated: 1926 (village); 1958 (city)

Government
  - Type: Council–manager
  - Mayor: Robert Taylor
  - City manager: Scott Adkins

Area
  - Total: 9.86 sq mi (25.55 km^{2})
  - Land: 9.84 sq mi (25.48 km^{2})
  - Water: 0.027 sq mi (0.07 km^{2})
- Elevation: 614 ft (187 m)

Population (2020)
  - Total: 47,710
  - Density: 4,850.4/sq mi (1,872.74/km^{2})
- Time zone: UTC-5 (Eastern (EST))
  - Summer (DST): UTC-4 (EDT)
- ZIP Code: 48066
- Area code: 586
- FIPS code: 26-69800
- GNIS feature ID: 0636239
- Website: www.roseville-mi.gov

Roseville is a city in Macomb County in the U.S. state of Michigan. A northern suburb of Detroit, Roseville is located roughly 13 miles (20.9 km) northeast of downtown Detroit. As of the 2020 census, the city had a population of 47,710.

== History ==
The first permanent post office in the area was established in 1840 by William Rose who named it "Roseville" in honor of his father Dennison Rose, a veteran of the War of 1812.

The village of Roseville was incorporated in 1926, and the municipal building was constructed in 1929 at Gratiot Avenue and Meier Road. This replaced the Erin Township Building that was built near the corner of 11 Mile Road and Gratiot in 1886. The 1929 building housed administrative offices as well as the police and fire departments until the 1960s, when separate police and fire stations were constructed. City offices remained in the building until 1974.

Michigan's first commercial airport, Packard Field, opened at Gratiot Avenue and Frazho Road in 1919. It was renamed Gratiot Airport in 1929, and later Hartung Field. The Eastgate Shopping Center was constructed on the site in the 1950s.

The Erin-Roseville Library was established in 1936 in one room of the municipal building. The library moved to its own building in the 1960s and into the newly constructed civic center in 1974. In 2010, it was circulating approximately 250,000 items annually.

In 1958, the village and remaining parts of Erin Township were incorporated as the City of Roseville.

An early regional mall, the Macomb Mall, opened in 1964 and is still open today, located west of Gratiot and Masonic.

== Geography ==
Roseville is in southern Macomb County, 14 miles (23 km) northeast of downtown Detroit. It is bordered to the east by St. Clair Shores, to the south by Eastpointe, to the west by Warren, and to the north by Fraser and Clinton Township. Mount Clemens, the Macomb county seat, is 7 miles (11 km) to the northeast.

According to the United States Census Bureau, Roseville has a total area of 9.86 square miles (25.54 km^{2}), of which 9.84 square miles (25.49 km^{2}) are land and 0.03 square miles (0.08 km^{2}), or 0.27%, are water.

=== Main highways ===
- I-94 runs north–south, though still signed east- and westbound, along the eastern edge of the city. Between 10 and 12 Mile Roads, it forms the boundary between Roseville and St. Clair Shores.
- I-696 (Walter P. Reuther Freeway) travels east and west through the middle of Roseville.
- M-3 (Gratiot Avenue) (/ˈɡræʃɪt/; named after engineer Charles Gratiot) runs northeast and southwest, and (roughly) bisects the city as it connects Detroit to Mount Clemens and points north.
- M-97 (Groesbeck Highway), named for Governor Alex Groesbeck, is near the western edge of Roseville. It extends northeast from Detroit and is a high-speed and broad diagonal connector to northern Macomb County.

=== Unnumbered roads ===
- East–west travel is mainly on the mile roads; that is, 10 Mile Road on the south (Eastpointe, formerly known as East Detroit) border through 14 Mile Road on the north border.
- Utica Road is an important diagonal connector that crosses the city from southeast to northwest, starting at Martin Road, near Gratiot Avenue, and extending to the city's northern boundary at 13 Mile, then to Fraser, Clinton Township, Sterling Heights and Utica beyond.

== Government ==
Roseville has a council-manager government. Voters elect the six council members, mayor, city clerk and treasurer for four-year terms. The terms are staggered so that only three council members are selected in odd-year general elections.

Roseville is located within the 39th Judicial District with the city of Fraser.

== Demographics ==
Historical population
Census	Pop.	Note	%±
1930	6,836		—
1940	9,023		32.0%
1950	15,816		75.3%
1960	50,195		217.4%
1970	60,529		20.6%
1980	54,311		−10.3%
1990	51,412		−5.3%
2000	48,129		−6.4%
2010	47,299		−1.7%
2020	47,710		0.9%
U.S. Decennial Census

=== 2020 census ===
As of the 2020 census, Roseville had a population of 47,710. The median age was 38.6 years. 21.1% of residents were under the age of 18 and 14.8% of residents were 65 years of age or older. For every 100 females there were 95.4 males, and for every 100 females age 18 and over there were 92.8 males age 18 and over.

100.0% of residents lived in urban areas, while 0.0% lived in rural areas.

There were 20,085 households in Roseville, of which 27.7% had children under the age of 18 living in them. Of all households, 31.5% were married-couple households, 24.0% were households with a male householder and no spouse or partner present, and 34.8% were households with a female householder and no spouse or partner present. About 33.9% of all households were made up of individuals and 12.4% had someone living alone who was 65 years of age or older.

There were 21,256 housing units, of which 5.5% were vacant. The homeowner vacancy rate was 1.8% and the rental vacancy rate was 5.8%.

Racial composition as of the 2020 census
Race	Number	Percentage
White	32,695	68.5%
Black or African American	9,989	20.9%
American Indian and Alaska Native	179	0.4%
Asian	886	1.9%
Native Hawaiian and Other Pacific Islander	13	0.0%
Some other race	443	0.9%
Two or more races	3,505	7.3%
Hispanic or Latino (of any race)	1,319	2.8%

=== 2010 census ===
As of the census of 2010, there were 47,299 people, 19,553 households, and 12,055 families living in the city. The population density was 4,811.7 inhabitants per square mile (1,857.8/km^{2}). There were 21,260 housing units at an average density of 2,162.8 per square mile (835.1/km^{2}). The racial makeup of the city was 83.1% White, 11.8% African American, 0.4% Native American, 1.6% Asian, 0.4% from other races, and 2.6% from two or more races; 2% of the population was Hispanic or Latino of any race.

There were 19,553 households, of which 30.9% had children under the age of 18 living with them, 38.3% were married couples living together, 17.4% had a female householder with no husband present, 6.0% had a male householder with no wife present, and 38.3% were non-families. 31.7% of all households were made up of individuals, and 11.6% had someone living alone who was 65 years of age or older. The average household size was 2.41 and the average family size was 3.03.

The median age in the city was 37.9 years. 23% of residents were under the age of 18; 8.9% were between the ages of 18 and 24; 28.3% were from 25 to 44; 26.7% were from 45 to 64; and 13.1% were 65 years of age or older. The gender makeup of the city was 48.4% male and 51.6% female.

=== 2000 census ===
As of the census of 2000, there were 48,129 people, 19,976 households, and 12,724 families living in the city. The population density was 4,905.6 inhabitants per square mile (1,894.1/km^{2}). There were 20,519 housing units at an average density of 2,091.4 per square mile (807.5/km^{2}). The racial makeup of the city was 93.43% White, 2.60% African American, 0.42% Native American, 1.63% Asian, 0.03% Pacific Islander, 0.32% from other races, and 1.57% from two or more races; 1.5% of the population was Hispanic or Latino of any race.

Of the 19,976 households, 28.6% had children under the age of 18 living with them, 46.4% were married couples living together, 12.7% had a female householder with no husband present, and 36.3% were non-families. 30.8% of all households were made up of individuals, and 12.6% had someone living alone who was 65 years of age or older. The average household size was 2.40 and the average family size was 3.02.

In the city, the population was varied widely, with 23.1% under the age of 18, 8.2% from 18 to 24, 33.0% from 25 to 44, 20.2% from 45 to 64, and 15.4% who were 65 years of age or older. The median age was 36 years. For every 100 females, there were 93.8 males. For every 100 females age 18 and over, there were 90.1 males.

The median income for a household in the city was $41,220, and the median income for a family was $49,244. Males had a median income of $40,113 versus $26,281 for females. The per capita income for the city was $19,823. About 6.1% of families and 7.9% of the population were below the poverty line, including 9.9% of those under age 18 and 5.8% of those age 65 or over.

== Education ==
Public schools are operated by Roseville Community Schools and Fraser Public Schools. Roseville Community Schools operates seven elementary schools, two middle schools and one high school. Fraser Public Schools operates two elementary schools in the city.

The charter school Conner Creek Academy East is in the city.

St. Angela School of the Roman Catholic Archdiocese of Detroit operated from approximately 1954 until the 2010s.

== Notable people ==
- Joe Block (born 1978), baseball broadcaster for Pittsburgh Pirates
- Crystal Reed (born 1985), actress
- Walter C. Wetzel (1919–1945), 1946 Medal of Honor recipient (posthumously, for actions on April 3, 1945)
- Eric Bischoff (born 1955), wrestling Promoter for WCW and WWE
- Eminem (born 1972), rapper, lived in Roseville during childhood
