= Shelby Public Schools =

School district in Michigan, United States

Address
- 525 North State Street Shelby, Oceana County, Michigan, 49455; United States

District information
- Grades: PreKindergarten–12
- Superintendent: Mark Olmstead
- Schools: 3
- Budget: $30,688,000 2022-2023 expenditures
- NCES District ID: 2631320

Students and staff
- Students: 1,059 (2024-2025)
- Teachers: 68.14 (on an FTE basis) (2024-2025)
- Staff: 184.04 FTE (2024-2025)
- Student–teacher ratio: 15.54 (2024-2025)

Other information
- Website: www.shelbypublicschools.net

Shelby Public Schools is a public school district in West Michigan. It serves Shelby, New Era, Benona Township, part of Rothbury, and parts of the townships of Claybanks, Ferry, Golden, Grant, Hart, Newfield, Otto, and Shelby.

== History ==
Shelby High School was established in 1881.

Shelby Public School was built in 1924 at 142 West Fifth Street. In 2001, the upper floors were demolished and the lower floors were renovated to become the Shelby Early Childhood Center.

Shelby Junior High opened in November 1962. It received additions in 1970 to become the high school, and the former high school building became a junior high.

The current Shelby High School opened in January 1998. At the time, the district had four elementary schools and about 1,800 students. The former middle school became part of Thomas Reed Elementary, and the former high school became the district's middle school.

Ferry Community School became a part of Shelby's district in 1995. Built in 1958, it closed at the end of the 2006-2007 school year. The district's three remaining elementary schools (Thomas Reed, New Era, and Benona) ultimately closed as well. The current Shelby Elementary School, paid for by a 2021 bond issue, opened in January 2024.

== Schools ==
Schools in Shelby Public Schools district
School	Address	Notes
Shelby High School	641 N State Street, Shelby	Grades 9–12. Built 1998.
Shelby Middle School	525 N State Street, Shelby	Grades 6-8. Built 1962, expanded 1970.
Shelby Elementary	1285 S Oceana Drive, Shelby	Grades K-5. Built 2024.
Oceana County Early Learning Center	568 N Oceana Drive, Hart	Preschool
Shelby Early Childhood Center	142 W 5th Street, Shelby	Preschool
