= Hesperia Community Schools =

School district in Michigan

Address
- 96 South Division Street Hesperia, Newaygo County, Michigan, 49421; United States

District information
- Grades: Kindergarten–12
- Superintendent: Bryan Mey
- Schools: 3
- Budget: $13,488,000 2022-2023 expenditures
- NCES District ID: 2618270

Students and staff
- Students: 799 (2024-2025)
- Teachers: 41.2 (on an FTE basis) (2024-2025)
- Staff: 100.31 FTE (2024-2025)
- Student–teacher ratio: 19.39 (2024-2025)
- District mascot: Panthers

Other information
- Website: www.hesp.net

Hesperia Community Schools is a public school district in West Michigan, headquartered in Hesperia. In Newaygo County, it serves parts of the townships of Beaver, Dayton, and Denver. In Oceana County, it serves parts of the townships of Ferry, Greenwood, Leavitt, and Newfield.

== History ==
The first class graduated from Hesperia High School in 1890. The Works Progress Administration helped fund a new school, which opened in fall 1939 on the site of the current campus and initially served all grades.

A new elementary school was dedicated on May 3, 1955. A new gymnasium was built in 1956 to serve the existing junior/senior high school on the site.

On September 25, 1962, voters turned down a bond issue to replace the 1939 school building. An inspection later that fall of the junior/senior high school by the state fire marshal raised concerns, and a structural engineering firm's inspection confirmed the district's fears: the building was in immediate danger of collapse. Cracks were found all over the building, and bowed walls, loose blocks, and separation between floors and walls meant the building was unsafe for students. Classes were cancelled until the district arranged for the junior and senior high students to share other district buildings in split-day sessions. In an effort known as "Operation Hesperia", the district closed on December 6 so that teachers could move belongings and equipment out of the condemned school, all in the midst of a snowstorm.

The district tried again to pass a bond issue on April 1, 1963. This time, it passed. Later that year, the 1939 school was demolished. The 1964 yearbook showed the crowded condition of the schools, as the gymnasium had been partitioned into temporary classrooms.

A larger elementary school opened in April 1964, followed by the junior/senior high school, connected to the 1956 gymnasium, five months later. The elementary school was ultimately named for Patricia St. Clair, an elementary school principal and kindergarten teacher.

The 1955 elementary school, known as the Butler building, was torn down and a new high school section was built around 1996, funded by a 1995 bond issue. The new addition connected the schools on the campus and the former high school section was renovated to become a dedicated middle school. Bond issues also passed in 2008 and 2025.

== Schools ==
Schools in the district share a building at 96 South Division Street in Hesperia. After the addition of the 1996 high school, the schools retain separate identities but are connected by hallways and share some rooms and spaces.

Schools in Hesperia Community Schools district
School	Notes
Hesperia High School	Grades 9–12. Built around 1996.
David C. Outwin Middle School	Grades 6–8; built 1964
Patricia St. Clair Elementary	Grades K-5; built 1964
