= M-82 (Michigan highway) =

State highway in Newaygo and Montcalm counties in Michigan, United States

M-82
- M-82 highlighted in red

Route information
- Maintained by MDOT
- Length: 31.492 mi (50.681 km)
- Existed: 1926–present

Major junctions
- West end: M-120 near Fremont
- M-37 at Newaygo
- East end: US 131 / M-46 at Howard City

Location
- Country: United States
- State: Michigan
- Counties: Newaygo, Montcalm

Highway system
- Michigan State Trunkline Highway System; Interstate; US; State; Byways
← M-81	→ M-83

M-82 is a state trunkline in the Lower Peninsula in the US state of Michigan that travels between Fremont and Howard City. The section between Newaygo and Howard City travels through Fremont and along the southern edge of Manistee National Forest. The current version of M-82 is actually the second in the state; the first usage appeared in the Upper Peninsula by 1919. The Lower Peninsula routing has been in use since the 1920s. Various extensions and truncations have shifted the terminus as far west as New Era or Hesperia in the past. The current route was finalized in the late 1970s

== Route description ==
M-82 begins at a junction with M-120 and B-86 west of Fremont. This junction is at a tripoint of county lines. M-120 forms the north–south Newaygo–Oceana and Newaygo–Muskegon county lines. B-86, which forms the east–west Oceana–Muskegon county line runs due west of the intersection. M-82 exits the intersection to the east. The highway runs along 48th Street through rural farms into the community of Fremont. The road, now called Main Street, passes through the downtown area and M-82 turns south along Stewart Avenue out of town. The highway rounds a curve and transitions to 72nd Street running eastward through more farm land. As the trunkline approaches Newaygo, the terrain becomes more wooded near the Muskegon River. M-82 follows Fremont Street east to a junction with M-37. The two highways merge and run concurrently over the river and into downtown on State Street. South of downtown, M-82 turns east again, independent of M-37, and runs along 82nd Street on the southern edge of the Manistee National Forest. The east end of M-82 is at exit 118 on US 131/M-46 west of Howard City.

The Michigan Department of Transportation (MDOT), as a part of its maintenance responsibilities, tracks the volume of traffic using its roadways. These levels are expressed in terms of a metric called average annual daily traffic (AADT), which is a calculation of the traffic along a segment of road for any average day of the year. In 2009, the department's measurements indicated that a segment of M-82 west of Fremont had the peak volume for the highway at 16,532 vehicles daily. The traffic nadir was 4,018 vehicles east of Newaygo. In addition, MDOT has not had any section of the highway listed on the National Highway System, a network of roads important to the country's economy, defense, and mobility.

== History ==
=== Previous designation ===
The first usage of M-82 was in the Upper Peninsula by July 1, 1919. The trunkline started at M-25 and ran north of Newberry to the vicinity of Eight Mile Corner. It was later replaced by M-48 in 1926.

=== Current designation ===
The current M-82 dates back to 1926. It ran from US 31 in Hart to the northern junction of US 131 and M-46 in Howard City. The highway was routed through Ferry, Hesperia and Fremont, replacing M-41. In late 1936, M-46 was extended along the section between Newaygo and Howard City, forming a M-46/M-82 concurrency to fill a gap in the M-46 routing. This concurrent section became just M-46 in 1938, shortening M-82 back to the northern M-37 junction in Newaygo. The highway was moved to a new alignment west of Ferry in late 1947 or early 1948. Instead of heading northwesterly to Hart, it was continued west to end in Shelby.

Two realignments in 1963 and 1964 rerouted the western end of the highway again. This time it was realigned to run from Hesperia to New Era, bypassing Ferry. A larger change around 1969 reconfigured the highway designations in Oceana County. M-20 replaced M-82 west of Hesperia, to end at New Era instead of Muskegon. The new M-120 designation replaced M-20 south of Hesperia. M-82 now ran from Hesperia to Newaygo only. The length of the highway was increased in 1973 when the eastern end was moved back to Howard City. M-46 was rerouted to follow the US 131 freeway south of Howard City to Cedar Springs, and replaced M-57 between Cedar Springs and Casnovia. This freed up the Newaygo to Howard City highway for a return to the M-82 designation. The last change came in 1978 when the concurrency with M-120 was eliminated in favor of M-120. The M-82 designation was truncated at this time to the junction west of Fremont, resulting in the current highway routing.

== Major intersections ==
County	Location	mi	km	Destinations	Notes
Muskegon–Oceana– Newaygo county tri-point	Holton^{a}–Greenwood^{b}– Dayton^{c}–Sheridan^{c} township quadri-point	0.000	0.000	M-120 – Muskegon, Hesperia B-86 west – Montague	Western terminus is at county tri-point; roadway continues west as B-86 along Muskegon–Oceana county line
Newaygo	Newaygo	15.025	24.180	M-37 north – White Cloud, Baldwin	Northern end of M-37 concurrency through town
Newaygo	Newaygo	16.673	26.833	M-37 south – Grand Rapids	Southern end of M-37 concurrency
Montcalm	Howard City	31.492	50.681	US 131 / M-46 – Grand Rapids, Cadillac	Exit 118 on US 131/M-46
1.000 mi = 1.609 km; 1.000 km = 0.621 mi: Concurrency terminus^{a}Muskegon County • ^{b}Oceana County • ^{c}Newaygo County
