= Hart Public School District =

School district in Michigan, United States

Address
- 301 Johnson St. W Hart, Oceana County, Michigan, 49420; United States

District information
- Grades: PreKindergarten - 12
- Superintendent: Mark Platt
- Schools: 3
- Budget: $20,593,000 2022-2023 expenditures
- NCES District ID: 2617860

Students and staff
- Students: 1,192 (2024-2025)
- Teachers: 79.87 (on an FTE basis) (2024-2025)
- Staff: 251.8 FTE (2024-2025)
- Student–teacher ratio: 14.92 (2024-2025)

Other information
- Website: www.hartschools.net

Hart Public School District is a public school district in West Michigan. In Oceana County, it serves Hart, Elbridge Township, and parts of the townships of Crystal, Ferry, Golden, Hart, Leavitt, and Shelby.

== History ==
The Hart school district was organized in 1867, but students were not separated into grades until 1878. Prior to 1893, two frame buildings were used as schools (a high school and an elementary). A new school building opened in 1893, and it would serve as Hart's only school until Spitler Elementary opened in fall 1955. Additions were built in 1902, 1912, and 1937.

In February 1959, the upper floors of the 1893 building were found to be structurally unsound. Voters approved construction of a replacement building in 1960. It opened in January 1962. It was designed by architecture firm VanderMeiden and Kotelles of Grand Haven.

The current middle school opened in fall 1997.

=== Normal school ===
From at least 1909 and into the 1940s, Hart High School operated the Oceana County Normal School, or teacher training school. Graduates of this one-year post-secondary program could be hired to teach in rural schools in the county on a probationary basis, and the credits could be transferred to a state university for the attainment of a teaching degree.

== Schools ==
Schools in Hart Public School District share a campus near the corner of S. Peach Avenue and W. Johnson Street in Hart.

Schools in Hanover-Horton School District
School	Address	Notes
Hart High School	300 W Johnson St., Hart	Grades 9–12; built 1962
Hart Middle School	308 W Johnson St., Hart	Grades 5–8; built 1997
Spitler Elementary	302 W Johnson St., Hart	Grades K–4; built 1955
Diman-Wolf Early Childhood Center	306 W Johnson St., Hart	Preschool
