= Holton Public Schools =

School district in Michigan

Address
- 6500 4th Street Holton, Muskegon County, Michigan, 49425; United States

District information
- Grades: PreKindergarten–12
- Superintendent: Dr. Adam Bayne
- Schools: 4
- Budget: $13,897,000 2022-2023 expenditures
- NCES District ID: 2618510

Students and staff
- Students: 780 (2024-2025)
- Teachers: 52.47 (on an FTE basis) (2024-2025)
- Staff: 113.27 FTE (2024-2025)
- Student–teacher ratio: 14.87 (2024-2025)

Other information
- Website: www.holtonschools.org

Holton Public Schools is a public school district in West Michigan. In Muskegon County, it serves parts of the townships of Blue Lake, Cedar Creek, and Holton. In Oceana County, it serves parts of the townships of Greenwood and Otto.

== History ==
In late 1956, construction began on a new elementary school, as Blue Lake school district had recently consolidated with Holton and a modestly higher enrollment was expected. A larger elementary school was dedicated on October 7, 1966.

The high school and junior high schools remained in the district's old school until 1973, when a new middle school opened. Guido A. Binda of Battle Creek was the architect. The school was described in the Muskegon Chronicle as having a central kitchen to serve the district's other schools, an 1,800-spectator gymnasium with a wooden floor, and a color palette of "browns, oranges, deep greens—instead of the usual pastels which have been such a cliche in institution-type buildings." The current high school, an addition to the middle school, opened in spring 1976. The school's completion was celebrated with an open house on May 9, 1976.

Around 2000, a dedicated middle school was built. It was paid for with a 1998 bond issue. In 2014, it became the district's elementary school as middle school students returned to attending class in the high school. The former elementary school became an administration building and preschool, and the former administration building and maintenance building were demolished. The reorganization came after a 20-percent decline in enrollment in the previous 13 years and the ensuing need to reduce costs.

Bond issues passed in 2005 and 2018 to fund facility improvements and school bus purchases.

== Schools ==
Schools in the district share a campus at 6500 4th Street in Holton. The middle and high schools are in the same building.

Schools in Holton Public Schools district
School	Notes
Holton High School	Grades 9–12
Holton Middle School	Grades 6–8
Holton Elementary	Grades PreK-5
Holton Virtual Academy	Grades 6-12; online school
