= Crystal Township, Michigan =

Crystal Township is the name of two locations in the U.S. state of Michigan:

- Crystal Township, Montcalm County, Michigan
- Crystal Township, Oceana County, Michigan

== See also ==
- Crystal Township (disambiguation)
