= Claybanks Township, Michigan =

- Township
- Location within the state of Michigan Claybanks Township, Michigan (the United States)
- Coordinates: 43°31′23″N 86°26′25″W
- Country: United States
- State: Michigan
- County: Oceana

Area
  - Total: 24.0 sq mi (62.2 km^{2})
  - Land: 23.9 sq mi (61.8 km^{2})
  - Water: 0.15 sq mi (0.4 km^{2})
- Elevation: 817 ft (249 m)

Population (2020)
  - Total: 855
  - Density: 32/sq mi (12.5/km^{2})
- Time zone: UTC-5 (Eastern (EST))
  - Summer (DST): UTC-4 (EDT)
- ZIP codes: 49437 (Montague), 49446 (New Era), 49455 (Shelby)
- FIPS code: 26-16200
- GNIS feature ID: 1626091
- Website: https://www.claybankstownship.org/

Claybanks Township is a civil township of Oceana County in the U.S. state of Michigan. The population was 855 at the 2020 census.

== History ==
Claybanks Township was established in 1855.

== Communities ==
- Flower Creek was a settlement centered around a sawmill built in 1863. It had a post office from 1863 until 1906.
- Stony Lake is an unincorporated community in the northwest corner of the township on the boundary with Benona Township at 43°33′35″N 86°30′00″W. Historically, the settlement was at the western end of the 272-acre (1.10 km^{2}) Stony Lake, but development now encircles much of the lake shore.
- The City of Montague is to the southeast and the southern portion of the township is served by the Montague ZIP code, 49437.
- The Village of New Era is to the east and much of the northern portion of the township is served by the New Era ZIP code, 49446.
- The Village of Shelby is to the northeast and the northwest corner of the township is served by the Shelby ZIP code, 49455.

== Geography ==
According to the United States Census Bureau, the township has a total area of 24.0 square miles (62 km^{2}), of which, 23.9 square miles (62 km^{2}) of it is land and 0.2 square miles (0.52 km^{2}) of it (0.62%) is water.

== Demographics ==
As of the 2010 census Claybanks Township had a population of 777. The ethnic and racial makeup of the population was 96.0% white, 1.3% African-American, 2.7% Native American, 2.1% from some other race and 5.5% Hispanic or Latino.

As of the census of 2000, there were 831 people, 313 households, and 240 families residing in the township. The population density was 34.8 inhabitants per square mile (13.4/km^{2}). There were 511 housing units at an average density of 21.4 units per square mile (8.3 units/km^{2}). The racial makeup of the township was 96.27% White, 0.24% African American, 0.48% Native American, 0.24% Asian, 1.32% from other races, and 1.44% from two or more races. Hispanic or Latino of any race were 3.97% of the population.

There were 313 households, out of which 28.4% had children under the age of 18 living with them, 67.7% were married couples living together, 5.4% had a female householder with no husband present, and 23.3% were non-families. 21.7% of all households were made up of individuals, and 8.0% had someone living alone who was 65 years of age or older. The average household size was 2.65 and the average family size was 3.07.

In the township the population was spread out, with 25.0% under the age of 18, 7.5% from 18 to 24, 24.4% from 25 to 44, 27.6% from 45 to 64, and 15.5% who were 65 years of age or older. The median age was 42 years. For every 100 females, there were 103.7 males. For every 100 females age 18 and over, there were 108.4 males.

The median income for a household in the township was $41,319, and the median income for a family was $45,833. Males had a median income of $35,652 versus $22,262 for females. The per capita income for the township was $17,351. About 4.4% of families and 7.3% of the population were below the poverty line, including 13.3% of those under age 18 and 2.8% of those age 65 or over.
