= Shelby, Michigan =

Shelby is the name of some places in the U.S. state of Michigan:

- Shelby Charter Township, Michigan in Macomb County
  - Shelby, Macomb County, Michigan, an unincorporated community
- Shelby Township, Michigan in Oceana County
  - Shelby, Oceana County, Michigan, a village
