= M-120 (Michigan highway) =

State highway in Michigan, United States

M-120
- M-120 highlighted in red

Route information
- Maintained by MDOT
- Length: 27.901 mi (44.902 km)
- Existed: 1969–present

Major junctions
- South end: Bus. US 31 in Muskegon
- US 31 near Muskegon; M-82 near Fremont
- North end: M-20 in Hesperia

Location
- Country: United States
- State: Michigan
- Counties: Muskegon, Oceana, Newaygo

Highway system
- Michigan State Trunkline Highway System; Interstate; US; State; Byways
← M-119	→ M-121

M-120 is a state trunkline highway in the US state of Michigan in the southwest Lower Peninsula. The highway runs northeast from Muskegon to Hesperia. In between, the road passes through suburban Muskegon, forests and farmland. Some 5,900–26,000 vehicles use the highway each day on average as it runs long a series of roads that follow county lines in the area.

The current highway to bear the M-120 designation is the third in the state. The first was a spur route in the Lansing area in the 1930s. The second was a route that connected to like-numbered state highways in both Ohio and Indiana. The current M-120 was originally part of M-20 until that highway was rerouted between New Era and US Highway 31 (US 31).

== Route description ==
The current route starts at Business US 31 (Bus. US 31) where Muskegon Lake and the Muskegon River meet in Muskegon. As it crosses the river, it is known as the Veterans Memorial Causeway, with a section of Veterans Memorial Park between the northbound and southbound sections of the road. This road continues north as Whitehall Road, which connects Muskegon to Whitehall. At Whitehall Road, M-120 turns east on Holton Road and continues in a northeastern direction through the suburb of North Muskegon. The south side of the roadway abuts residential areas and Reeths-Puffer High School; the north side is largely undeveloped. M-120 meets the US 31 freeway in Muskegon Township. Holton Road continues northeasterly past Oak Hill Cemetery and turns northerly at Bard Road. The highway curves to the northeast again through Twin Lake to avoid several lakes in the area. The landscape along the road between Twin Lake and Holton, like much of the overall route of the highway, is woodland. Northeast of Holton, those forests transition to farm land as M-120 turns to the north. The highway meets B-31 as it turns north to run along the Muskegon–Newaygo county line.

As M-120 continues north along the county line, it runs in Holton Township in Muskegon County to the west and Sheridan Township in Newaygo County to the east along Maple Island Road. West of Fremont, the highway meets an intersection with M-82 and B-86. B-86 runs along the Muskegon–Oceana county line, and M-82 runs along a township line in Newaygo County. North of this intersection, M-120 follows the Oceana–Newaygo county line that divides Greenwood Township from Dayton Township. Maple Island Road enters the south side of Hesperia on Division Street. M-120 terminates at an intersection with M-20 in the middle of the village, 27.901 miles (44.902 km) from its starting point.

The Michigan Department of Transportation (MDOT) maintains M-120, like all other components of the Michigan state trunkline highway system. As part of these responsibilities, the department tracks traffic volumes along the highway. MDOT uses a metric called average annual daily traffic, which is a calculation of the traffic along a roadway segment for any average day of the year. In 2009, the highest traffic levels were near the southern terminus at 26,736 vehicles each day. The lowest levels MDOT calculated were in Holton at 5,936 vehicles daily. The section between the south end and US 31, M-120 has been listed on the National Highway System, a network of roads important to the nation's economy, defense, and mobility. The remainder of the highway has not been listed.

== History ==
=== Previous routings ===
The M-120 designation was originally used on two different roadways in the state. In 1930, a road from US 16 for about a mile at the northwest corner of Lansing was numbered M-120. In early 1939, the M-174 designation replaced the M-120 moniker on the road. Later that year, the Michigan State Highway Department (MSHD) used the number for a road along the Michigan-Ohio state line. This highway connected to State Route 120 on its east end at the state line and ran west to US 127 at Meridian Road along the Hillsdale–Lenawee county line. By the end of 1940, M-120 was extended through Hillsdale County to connect to State Road 120 along the short north–south Michigan–Indiana border. By the middle of 1961, the M-120 designation was retired by the MSHD again. The Ohio and Indiana SR 120 highways are still in place today with only the county road in Michigan connecting them.

=== Current routing ===
The MSHD's successor, the Michigan Department of State Highways, realigned the route of M-20 through Western Michigan in 1969. In the aftermath of the reroute, the M-20 designation was moved from Muskegon to New Era. The former routing of M-20 south of Hesperia to Muskegon was renumbered M-120, including a segment that ran concurrently with M-82. That concurrency was removed in 1978.

== Major intersections ==
County	Location	mi	km	Destinations	Notes
Muskegon	Muskegon	0.000	0.000	Bus. US 31 (Seaway Drive/Skyway Drive) / LMCT – Downtown Muskegon	
Muskegon	Muskegon Township	4.134– 4.173	6.653– 6.716	US 31 / LMCT – Ludington, Grand Haven	Exit 118 on US 31
Muskegon–Newaygo county line	Brunswick	18.050	29.049	B-31 (Maple Island Road) – Nunica	M-120 follows the Muskegon–Newaygo county line here
Muskegon–Oceana– Newaygo county tri-point	Holton^{a}–Greenwood^{b}– Dayton^{c}–Sheridan^{c} township quadri-point	20.914	33.658	M-82 east (48th Street) – Fremont B-86 west (Skeets Road) – Montague	B-86 is located on the Muskegon–Oceana county line; M-120 is on the Muskegon–Newaygo county line south of the intersection and the Oceana–Newaygo county line north of the junction
Oceana–Newaygo county line	Hesperia	27.901	44.902	M-20 (South Street) – New Era, White Cloud	M-120 is located on the Oceana–Newaygo county line here
1.000 mi = 1.609 km; 1.000 km = 0.621 mi^{a}Muskegon County • ^{b}Oceana County • ^{c}Newaygo County
