= Mears, Michigan =

- Census-designated place (CDP) & unincorporated community
- Location within Michigan Location within the United States
- Coordinates: 43°40′54″N 86°25′5″W
- Country: United States
- State: Michigan
- County: Oceana
- Township: Golden

Area
  - Total: 1.14 sq mi (2.94 km^{2})
  - Land: 1.14 sq mi (2.94 km^{2})
  - Water: 0 sq mi (0.00 km^{2})
- Elevation: 776 ft (236.5 m)

Population (2020)
  - Total: 332
  - Density: 292.0/sq mi (112.75/km^{2})
- Time zone: UTC-5 (Eastern (EST))
  - Summer (DST): UTC-4 (EDT)
- ZIP Code: 49436
- Area code: 231
- FIPS code: 26-52720
- GNIS feature ID: 2806347

Mears is an unincorporated community and census-designated place (CDP) in Golden Township, Oceana County, Michigan, United States. As of the 2020 census, Mears had a population of 332.

== History ==
The community was founded by mill owner Charles Mears in 1873. A post office opened in May 1873.

== Geography ==
The Silver Lake Sand Dunes are the biggest attraction in Mears, bringing in over a million visitors in a year.

Mears is on the west side of the Lower Peninsula of Michigan, 3 miles (5 km) west of Hart, 23 miles (37 km) south of Ludington, and 39 miles (63 km) north of Muskegon.

The Mears ZIP code, 49436, includes most of Golden Township as well as small areas of Pentwater Township to the north, Hart Township to the east, and Benona Township to the south. 39 miles (63 km) Mears was first listed as a CDP prior to the 2020 census.

== Demographics ==
Historical population
| Census | Pop. | Note | %± |
|---|---|---|---|
| 2020 | 332 | | — |
U.S. Decennial Census

== See also ==
- The Mears Newz
