= Golden Township, Michigan =

- Township
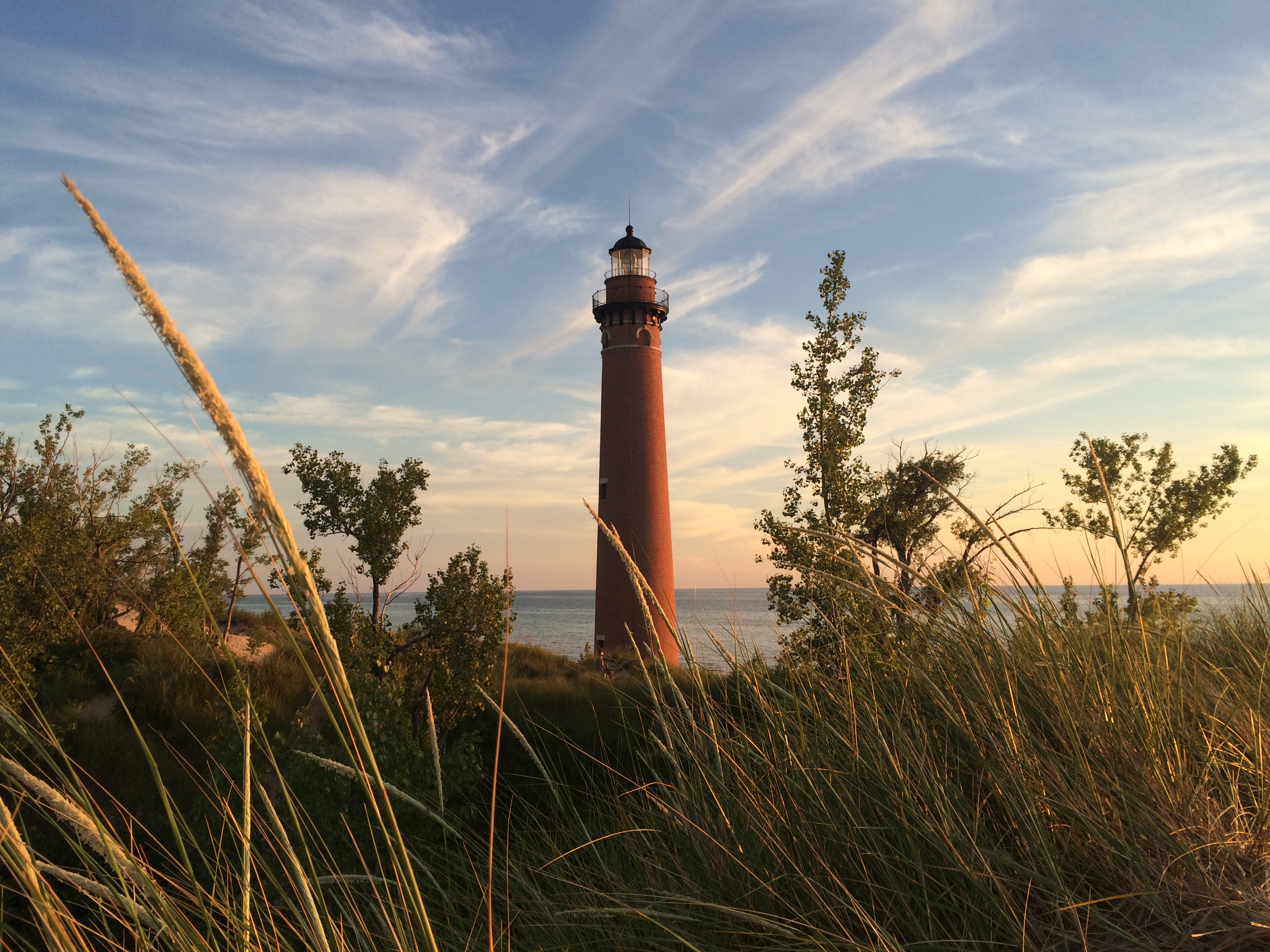
- Little Sable Point Light

- Location within the state of Michigan Golden Township, Michigan (the United States)
- Coordinates: 43°40′42″N 86°27′57″W
- Country: United States
- State: Michigan
- County: Oceana

Area
  - Total: 35.0 sq mi (90.6 km^{2})
  - Land: 33.6 sq mi (86.9 km^{2})
  - Water: 1.5 sq mi (3.8 km^{2})
- Elevation: 784 ft (239 m)

Population (2020)
  - Total: 1,660
  - Density: 50/sq mi (19.2/km^{2})
- Time zone: UTC-5 (Eastern (EST))
  - Summer (DST): UTC-4 (EDT)
- ZIP codes: 49420 (Hart, 49436 (Mears), 49449 (Pentwater), 49455 (Shelby)
- FIPS code: 26-32780
- GNIS feature ID: 1626361
- Website: https://goldentownshipmi.gov/

Golden Township is a civil township of Oceana County in the U.S. state of Michigan. The population was 1,660 at the 2020 census. The township is home to the Silver Lake Sand Dunes, and is located along the shore of Lake Michigan.

Golden Township was established in 1864.

== Communities ==
- Collinsville was an unincorporated community that grew up around a sawmill. It had a post office from 1872 until 1874.
- Mears is an unincorporated community and census-designated place in the eastern part of the township at 43°40′55″N 86°25′11″W. The community was founded by mill owner Charles Mears in 1873. A post office opened in May 1873. The Mears ZIP code, 49436, includes most of Golden Township as well as small areas of Pentwater Township to the north, Hart Township to the east, and Benona Township to the south.
- Hart is located to the east, and a small area in the northeast part of the township is served by the Hart ZIP code, 49420.
- Pentwater is located to the north, and a small area in the northeast part of the township is served by the Pentwater ZIP code, 49449.
- Upper Silver Lake Improvement Association is a homeowners association comprising over 600 parcels in and around the Upper Silver Lake Area http://www.uslia.org
- Shelby is to the southeast, and small areas in the southeast and southwest corners of the township are served by the Shelby ZIP code, 49455.

== Geography ==
According to the United States Census Bureau, the township has a total area of 35.0 square miles (91 km^{2}), of which, 33.5 square miles (87 km^{2}) of it is land and 1.5 square miles (3.9 km^{2}) of it (4.14%) is water.

The township is bounded on the west by Lake Michigan. A portion of the Lake Michigan shoreline and adjacent land is taken up by Silver Lake State Park.

== Demographics ==
As of the census of 2000, there were 1,810 people, 712 households, and 533 families residing in the township. The population density was 54.0 inhabitants per square mile (20.8/km^{2}). There were 2,203 housing units at an average density of 65.7 per square mile (25.4/km^{2}). The racial makeup of the township was 89.83% White, 0.39% African American, 0.94% Native American, 0.17% Asian, 6.69% from other races, and 1.99% from two or more races. Hispanic or Latino of any race were 11.05% of the population.

There were 712 households, out of which 26.3% had children under the age of 18 living with them, 65.4% were married couples living together, 6.9% had a female householder with no husband present, and 25.1% were non-families. 20.4% of all households were made up of individuals, and 7.6% had someone living alone who was 65 years of age or older. The average household size was 2.51 and the average family size was 2.88.

In the township the population was spread out, with 23.7% under the age of 18, 7.6% from 18 to 24, 23.1% from 25 to 44, 29.8% from 45 to 64, and 15.7% who were 65 years of age or older. The median age was 42 years. For every 100 females, there were 105.2 males. For every 100 females age 18 and over, there were 101.6 males.

The median income for a household in the township was $35,878, and the median income for a family was $41,250. Males had a median income of $32,321 versus $20,721 for females. The per capita income for the township was $17,934. About 9.3% of families and 14.5% of the population were below the poverty line, including 19.7% of those under age 18 and 1.7% of those age 65 or over.

== Recreation and tourism ==
Golden Township is home to many lakes, streams, and rivers. One of largest lakes in the area is Silver Lake. Silver Lake is a semi-circular lake with one side bordering the Silver Lake Sand Dunes. Silver Lake is an all sports lake where many people go kayaking, canoeing, boating, sailing, water skiing, wakeboarding, and more.

Silver Lake has a largely seasonal population due to its vast number of campgrounds, cottages, and summer homes.

The Sand Dunes are a state park and consist of a pedestrian area for hikers and visitors as well as a vehicle recreation area where dune buggies can drive up and down the hills. The Sand Dunes western border is Lake Michigan.

== See also ==
- The Mears Newz
