= Double JJ Resort Ranch Airport =

- IATA: none; ICAO: none; FAA LID: 42N

Summary
- Airport type: Public use
- Owner: Robert Lipsitz
- Serves: Rothbury, Michigan
- Elevation AMSL: 689 ft (210 m)
- Coordinates: 43°31′01″N 086°22′24″W
- Interactive map of Double JJ Resort Ranch Airport

Runways
Direction	Length		Surface
Direction	ft	m	Surface
9/27	3,600	1,097	Turf

Statistics (2006)
- Aircraft operations: 274
- Sources: FAA Michigan Airport Directory

Double JJ Resort Ranch Airport (FAA LID: 42N) was a privately owned, public use airport located two nautical miles (4 km) northwest of the central business district of Rothbury, in Oceana County, Michigan, United States.

The airport is closed, but Double JJ Resort continues to operate.

== Facilities and aircraft ==
Double JJ Resort Ranch Airport covered an area of 90 acres (36 ha) at an elevation of 689 feet (210 m) above mean sea level. It had one runway designated 9/27 with a turf surface measuring 3,600 by 100 feet (1,097 x 30 m). For the 12-month period ending December 31, 2006, the airport had 274 general aviation aircraft operations, an average of 22 per month.
