= Korean War Veterans Memorial Highway =

Korean War Veterans Memorial Highway can refer to:

- The portion of Interstate 5 in Oregon
- The portion of Interstate 59 in Georgia
- The portion of Interstate 69 in Indiana from Indianapolis north to the Michigan border
- The portion of Interstate 70 in Frederick County, Maryland
- The portion of Interstate 287 in New Jersey
- The portion of U.S. Route 51 in Wisconsin
- The toll portion of Delaware Route 1
- The portion of California State Route 58 in Kern County
- New York State Route 59
- The portion of M-82 from Newaygo to Howard City, Michigan

== See also ==
- Korean War Veterans Parkway in Staten Island, New York
