= Holton Township, Michigan =

- Township
- Location within Michigan Location within the United States
- Coordinates: 43°25′14″N 86°6′14″W
- Country: United States
- State: Michigan
- County: Muskegon

Area
  - Total: 35.7 sq mi (92 km^{2})
  - Land: 35.0 sq mi (91 km^{2})
  - Water: 0.7 sq mi (1.8 km^{2})
- Elevation: 735 ft (224 m)

Population (2020)
  - Total: 2,586
  - Density: 73.9/sq mi (28.5/km^{2})
- Time zone: UTC-5 (Eastern (EST))
  - Summer (DST): UTC-4 (EDT)
- ZIP codes: 49425 (Holton); 49457 (Twin Lake); 49412 (Fremont)
- Area code: 231
- FIPS code: 26-121-38820
- GNIS feature ID: 1626482
- Website: holtontownship.com

Holton Township is a civil township of Muskegon County in the U.S. state of Michigan. As of the 2020 census, the township population was 2,586.

== History ==
On November 14, 2023, Holton Township declared itself a Second Amendment Sanctuary in the State of Michigan. Concurrently, the township established the Holton Township militia.

== Geography ==
The township is in northern Muskegon County, bordered to the north by Oceana County and to the east by Newaygo County. It is 17 miles (27 km) northeast of Muskegon, the county seat, and 14 miles (23 km) east of Whitehall. State highway M-120 crosses the township, leading southwest to Muskegon and northeast to Fremont.

According to the U.S. Census Bureau, the township has a total area of 35.7 square miles (92 km^{2}), of which 35.0 square miles (91 km^{2}) are land and 0.7 square miles (1.8 km^{2}), or 2.08%, are water. The southern part of the township is drained by Cedar Creek, a southwest-flowing tributary of the Muskegon River, while the northern part is drained by Skeel Creek, a northwest-flowing tributary within the White River watershed.

=== Communities ===
- Holton is a small unincorporated community at the corners of sections 22, 23, 26 and 27 of the township at 43°24′48″N 86°04′46″W about 17 miles (27 km) by road northeast of Muskegon and about 18 miles (29 km) east of Lake Michigan. Holton was platted in 1871 and named for Henry H. Holt, a Muskegon County delegate to the State Constitutional Convention of 1867 and later Lieutenant Governor of Michigan, 1873–76. He donated the bell to the local Methodist church. A post office was established in February 1872. The Holton ZIP code, 49425, serves most of the township, as well as portions of surrounding townships.
- Brunswick is a small unincorporated community in section 13 of the township at 43°25′59″N 86°2′25″W on M-120 at the eastern boundary with section 18 of Sheridan Township in Newaygo County. It was founded about 1875 as the point where the stage coach road met the Pere Marquette Railway line between Muskegon and White Cloud. Passengers and mail were taken north from here to Hesperia. The settlement was first called "County Line" and later "Marionville", after the first postmaster, Isaac Marion. However, the post office, established May 1881, was called "Dash." It was renamed Brunswick, Muskegon County, in September 1897 and transferred to Newaygo County in April 1943. Originally there was a feed store in the community for farmers, and in the rear of that building there was a small post office. Both have since closed, and it is now served by the post office in neighboring Holton. St. Michaels Catholic Church and cemetery are located there. The community is located at the end of Brunswick Road. While the CSX rail line still runs through the town, the train station has closed.

== Demographics ==
Historical population
Census	Pop.	Note	%±
1880	892		—
1890	906		1.6%
1900	846		−6.6%
1910	915		8.2%
1920	809		−11.6%
1930	775		−4.2%
1940	925		19.4%
1950	1,075		16.2%
1960	1,449		34.8%
1970	1,499		3.5%
1980	2,022		34.9%
1990	2,318		14.6%
2000	2,532		9.2%
2010	2,515		−0.7%
2020	2,586		2.8%
U.S. Decennial Census

As of the census of 2000, there were 2,532 people, 903 households, and 682 families residing in the township. The population density was 71.9 inhabitants per square mile (27.8/km^{2}). There were 980 housing units at an average density of 27.8 per square mile (10.7/km^{2}). The racial makeup of the township was 96.01% White, 0.43% African American, 1.22% Native American, 0.24% Asian, 0.16% from other races, and 1.94% from two or more races. Hispanic or Latino of any race were 1.78% of the population.

There were 903 households, out of which 36.2% had children under the age of 18 living with them, 60.9% were married couples living together, 9.3% had a female householder with no husband present, and 24.4% were non-families. 18.7% of all households were made up of individuals, and 7.3% had someone living alone who was 65 years of age or older. The average household size was 2.80 and the average family size was 3.19.

In the township the population was spread out, with 29.9% under the age of 18, 7.3% from 18 to 24, 29.3% from 25 to 44, 23.4% from 45 to 64, and 10.1% who were 65 years of age or older. The median age was 36 years. For every 100 females, there were 110.0 males. For every 100 females age 18 and over, there were 103.9 males.

The median income for a household in the township was $37,813, and the median income for a family was $41,637. Males had a median income of $33,333 versus $22,857 for females. The per capita income for the township was $16,210. About 7.1% of families and 9.5% of the population were below the poverty line, including 14.5% of those under age 18 and none of those age 65 or over.

== Education ==
In 2000, Holton Public Schools was one of only seven school districts in the state of Michigan that would have been eligible for private school vouchers, on which there was a statewide referendum that year. Most residents were opposed to the measure, since they did not want competition for the local public school. The measure was defeated in Holton and across the state by about a 2:1 ratio.

The main festival of the year, Holton Days, is held in the last weekend of July.

The Holton Red Devils have a state title in volleyball in 1994. They were also runner-up in 1993. In baseball they were state runner-up in 2006, losing to #1 state ranked Homer 3–2.

Holton High School
