= Elbridge Township =

Elbridge Township may refer to the following places in the United States:

- Elbridge Township, Edgar County, Illinois
- Elbridge Township, Michigan
