= Lavender Labyrinth =

Garden in Shelby, Michigan

The Lavender Labyrinth is a three acre garden located 1.5 miles south of Silver Lake in Shelby, Michigan and 1.2 miles east of Lake Michigan. It is located at Cherry Point Farm & Market, which is owned by Barbara Bull.

== Design ==
The labyrinth was designed in 2001 by Bull and Conrad Heiderer, a landscape architect. The asymmetrical labyrinth integrates elements of time within its structure; one stone at the center represents the year, 12 interlocking circles represent the months in a year, 52 vertical posts on the arbor represent the weeks, and 7 cross pieces represent the days of the week. The circles in the labyrinth are seen to represent creation, due to the quality of having no beginning and no end. The flower-shaped design has allusions to the flower of life, which has interlocking circles surrounding one in the center.

The path to the stone circle center, which is the herb garden, is surrounded by a rock wall, earthy grounds, and lavender. It takes about an hour to reach the center of the labyrinth. The herb garden is filled with 150 types of herbs.

== Lavender ==
The lavender surrounding the labyrinth is planted in the spring, and it reaches its full bloom in mid-July through late-July. The lavender is collected and dried in late fall and sold in markets as an aromatherapy product.

== Visits ==
The lavender labyrinth is open and public for visitors. Many other labyrinths exist across the United States, such one in Monroe, Oregon.
