= Denver Township, Newaygo County, Michigan =

Denver Township, Michigan
- Township
- Location within the state of Michigan Denver Township, Michigan (the United States)
- Coordinates: 43°35′31″N 85°59′23″W
- Country: United States
- State: Michigan
- County: Newaygo

Area
  - Total: 35.8 sq mi (92.7 km^{2})
  - Land: 35.4 sq mi (91.6 km^{2})
  - Water: 0.42 sq mi (1.1 km^{2})
- Elevation: 784 ft (239 m)

Population (2020)
  - Total: 2,008
  - Density: 56.8/sq mi (21.9/km^{2})
- Time zone: UTC-5 (Eastern (EST))
  - Summer (DST): UTC-4 (EDT)
- FIPS code: 26-21700
- GNIS feature ID: 1626179
- Website: https://denvertownship.org/

Denver Township is a civil township of Newaygo County in the U.S. state of Michigan. The population was 2,008 at the 2020 census.

== Communities ==
- Hesperia is a village in the southwest corner of the township on the boundary with Newfield Township in Oceana County and is approximately evenly divided between them.

== Geography ==
According to the United States Census Bureau, the township has a total area of 35.8 square miles (93 km^{2}), of which 35.4 square miles (92 km^{2}) is land and 0.4 square miles (1.0 km^{2}) (1.20%) is water.

== Demographics ==
As of the census of 2000, there were 1,971 people, 743 households, and 523 families residing in the township. The population density was 55.7 inhabitants per square mile (21.5/km^{2}). There were 904 housing units at an average density of 25.6 per square mile (9.9/km^{2}). The racial makeup of the township was 96.09% White, 0.30% African American, 1.37% Native American, 0.05% Asian, 0.86% from other races, and 1.32% from two or more races. Hispanic or Latino of any race were 2.18% of the population.

There were 743 households, out of which 35.7% had children under the age of 18 living with them, 55.2% were married couples living together, 9.3% had a female householder with no husband present, and 29.6% were non-families. 25.6% of all households were made up of individuals, and 11.2% had someone living alone who was 65 years of age or older. The average household size was 2.65 and the average family size was 3.15.

In the township the population was spread out, with 29.8% under the age of 18, 7.3% from 18 to 24, 27.3% from 25 to 44, 22.6% from 45 to 64, and 13.0% who were 65 years of age or older. The median age was 36 years. For every 100 females, there were 96.5 males. For every 100 females age 18 and over, there were 94.1 males.

The median income for a household in the township was $33,365, and the median income for a family was $39,777. Males had a median income of $35,600 versus $23,214 for females. The per capita income for the township was $14,746. About 11.4% of families and 14.1% of the population were below the poverty line, including 15.7% of those under age 18 and 11.6% of those age 65 or over.
