= Walkerville, Michigan =

- Village
- Nickname: The Ville
- Location of Walkerville, Michigan
- Coordinates: 43°42′56″N 86°7′22″W
- Country: United States
- State: Michigan
- County: Oceana

Area
  - Total: 1.24 sq mi (3.22 km^{2})
  - Land: 1.24 sq mi (3.22 km^{2})
  - Water: 0 sq mi (0.00 km^{2})
- Elevation: 889 ft (271 m)

Population (2020)
  - Total: 246
  - Density: 197.8/sq mi (76.37/km^{2})
- Time zone: UTC-5 (Eastern (EST))
  - Summer (DST): UTC-4 (EDT)
- ZIP code: 49459
- Area code: 231
- FIPS code: 26-83020
- GNIS feature ID: 1622051

Walkerville is a village in Oceana County of the U.S. state of Michigan. The population was 247 at the 2010 census and 283 as of 2023. The village is located within Leavitt Township.

== History ==
Walkerville was founded by the Walker family in the 19th century. At one point, the village had a very busy railway passing through it. Walkerville suffered two major fires, which damaged the infrastructure greatly each time. Walkerville has not yet recovered to its post fire glory days. It currently is a community that helps in the cultivation of produce for which West Michigan is known, such as cherries, apples and asparagus.

In the summer of 2020, Camp Gan Israel of Michigan (based in Kalkaska Township, Michigan) expanded to a campgrounds in Walkerville, marking the first Jewish presence in the village with 100 staff and campers together resulting in the camp's residence comprising more than a third of the town's population.

At the climax of the summer, and to celebrate the 70th anniversary of the Rebbe's leadership, the camp printed 100 copies of the 7482nd edition of the Tanya (an early work of Hasidic philosophy, by Rabbi Shneur Zalman of Liadi, the founder of Chabad Hasidism, first published in 1797) on the grounds in Walkerville, based on a campaign The Lubavitcher Rebbe made in 1977/8 to print a Tanya in Every city.

== Geography ==
According to the United States Census Bureau, the village has a total area of 1.21 square miles (3.13 km^{2}), of which 1.08 square miles (2.80 km^{2}) is land and 0.13 square miles (0.34 km^{2}) is water.

== Demographics ==
Historical population
Census	Pop.	Note	%±
1910	371		—
1920	252		−32.1%
1930	250		−0.8%
1940	250		0.0%
1950	233		−6.8%
1960	261		12.0%
1970	319		22.2%
1980	296		−7.2%
1990	262		−11.5%
2000	254		−3.1%
2010	247		−2.8%
2020	246		−0.4%
U.S. Decennial Census

=== 2010 census ===
As of the census of 2010, there were 247 people, 84 households, and 63 families residing in the village. The population density was 228.7 inhabitants per square mile (88.3/km^{2}). There were 103 housing units at an average density of 95.4 per square mile (36.8/km^{2}). The racial makeup of the village was 83.4% White, 1.2% African American, 2.0% Native American, 0.4% Asian, 6.5% from other races, and 6.5% from two or more races. Hispanic or Latino of any race were 17.8% of the population.

There were 84 households, of which 36.9% had children under the age of 18 living with them, 57.1% were married couples living together, 10.7% had a female householder with no husband present, 7.1% had a male householder with no wife present, and 25.0% were non-families. 20.2% of all households were made up of individuals, and 7.2% had someone living alone who was 65 years of age or older. The average household size was 2.94 and the average family size was 3.30.

The median age in the village was 34.2 years. 27.5% of residents were under the age of 18; 9.8% were between the ages of 18 and 24; 26% were from 25 to 44; 25.2% were from 45 to 64; and 11.7% were 65 years of age or older. The gender makeup of the village was 49.8% male and 50.2% female.

=== 2000 census ===
As of the census of 2000, there were 254 people, 87 households, and 66 families residing in the village. The population density was 208.6 inhabitants per square mile (80.5/km^{2}). There were 104 housing units at an average density of 85.4 per square mile (33.0/km^{2}). The racial makeup of the village was 88.19% White, 2.36% African American, 1.97% Native American, 6.30% from other races, and 1.18% from two or more races. Hispanic or Latino of any race were 14.57% of the population.

There were 87 households, out of which 46.0% had children under the age of 18 living with them, 54.0% were married couples living together, 18.4% had a female householder with no husband present, and 24.1% were non-families. 20.7% of all households were made up of individuals, and 9.2% had someone living alone who was 65 years of age or older. The average household size was 2.92 and the average family size was 3.33.

In the village, the population was spread out, with 34.3% under the age of 18, 7.5% from 18 to 24, 32.7% from 25 to 44, 15.0% from 45 to 64, and 10.6% who were 65 years of age or older. The median age was 32 years. For every 100 females, there were 91.0 males. For every 100 females age 18 and over, there were 89.8 males.

The median income for a household in the village was $27,083, and the median income for a family was $31,429. Males had a median income of $31,083 versus $16,667 for females. The per capita income for the village was $9,305. About 25.0% of families and 32.5% of the population were below the poverty line, including 42.3% of those under the age of 18 and none of those ages 65 or older.
