= Rothbury, Michigan =

- Village
- Location of Rothbury, Michigan
- Coordinates: 43°30′23″N 86°20′45″W
- Country: United States
- State: Michigan
- County: Oceana

Area
  - Total: 2.57 sq mi (6.65 km^{2})
  - Land: 2.46 sq mi (6.37 km^{2})
  - Water: 0.92 sq mi (2.4 km^{2})
- Elevation: 702 ft (214 m)

Population (2020)
  - Total: 486
  - Density: 187.9/sq mi (72.53/km^{2})
- Time zone: UTC-5 (Eastern (EST))
  - Summer (DST): UTC-4 (EDT)
- ZIP code: 49452
- Area code: 231
- FIPS code: 26-69880
- GNIS feature ID: 1621442
- Website: https://villageofrothbury.org/

Rothbury is a general law village in Grant Township, Oceana County in the U.S. state of Michigan. As of the 2020 census, Rothbury had a population of 462.

== Geography ==
According to the United States Census Bureau, the village has a total area of 5.12 square miles (13.26 km^{2}), of which 4.20 square miles (10.88 km^{2}) is land and 0.92 square miles (2.38 km^{2}) is water.

== Demographics ==
=== 2010 census ===
Historical population
Census	Pop.	Note	%±
1970	394		—
1980	522		32.5%
1990	407		−22.0%
2000	416		2.2%
2010	432		3.8%
2020	462		6.9%
U.S. Decennial Census

As of the 2010 United States census, there were 432 people, 162 households, and 110 families living in the village. The population density was 480.0 inhabitants per square mile (185.3/km^{2}). There were 174 housing units at an average density of 193.3 per square mile (74.6/km^{2}). The racial makeup of the village was 86.1% White, 0.9% African American, 3.5% Native American, 1.9% from other races, and 7.6% from two or more races. Hispanic or Latino of any race were 14.8% of the population.

There were 162 households, of which 36.4% had children under the age of 18 living with them, 48.1% were married couples living together, 11.7% had a female householder with no husband present, 8.0% had a male householder with no wife present, and 32.1% were non-families. 27.2% of all households were made up of individuals, and 9.3% had someone living alone who was 65 years of age or older. The average household size was 2.63 and the average family size was 3.11.

The median age in the village was 34.5 years. 27.5% of residents were under the age of 18; 10.5% were between the ages of 18 and 24; 23.6% were from 25 to 44; 26.6% were from 45 to 64; and 11.8% were 65 years of age or older. The gender makeup of the village was 48.6% male and 51.4% female.

=== 2000 census ===
As of the 2000 United States census, there were 416 people, 157 households, and 118 families living in the village. The population density was 420.8 inhabitants per square mile (162.5/km^{2}). There were 167 housing units at an average density of 168.9 per square mile (65.2/km^{2}). The racial makeup of the village was 92.07% White, 1.92% Native American, 0.24% Asian, 5.05% from other races, and 0.72% from two or more races. Hispanic or Latino of any race were 9.13% of the population.

There were 157 households, out of which 34.4% had children under the age of 18 living with them, 51.6% were married couples living together, 14.0% had a female householder with no husband present, and 24.8% were non-families. 19.7% of all households were made up of individuals, and 7.0% had someone living alone who was 65 years of age or older. The average household size was 2.61 and the average family size was 2.88.

In the village, the population was spread out, with 28.4% under the age of 18, 10.6% from 18 to 24, 28.6% from 25 to 44, 21.6% from 45 to 64, and 10.8% who were 65 years of age or older. The median age was 33 years. For every 100 females, there were 105.9 males. For every 100 females age 18 and over, there were 109.9 males.

The median income for a household in the village was $30,357, and the median income for a family was $32,917. Males had a median income of $31,944 versus $23,750 for females. The per capita income for the village was $14,846. About 13.7% of families and 15.7% of the population were below the poverty line, including 14.6% of those under age 18 and 9.5% of those age 65 or over.

== See also ==
- Double JJ Resort Ranch Airport
- Electric Forest Festival—a three-day festival held in June
