= Crystal Township =

Crystal Township may refer to one of the following townships in the United States:

- Crystal Township, Hancock County, Iowa
- Crystal Township, Tama County, Iowa
- Crystal Township, Montcalm County, Michigan
- Crystal Township, Oceana County, Michigan
