= Shelby High School (Michigan) =

Location
- 641 North State Street; Shelby, Michigan 49455; United States; 43°37′12″N 86°21′43″W

Information
- Type: Public
- School district: Shelby Public Schools
- Principal: Zach Fricke
- Grades: 9–12
  - Grade 12: 94
- Colours: Purple and White
- Nickname: Tigers
- Rival: Hart
- Website: Shelby High School

Shelby High School is a high school in Shelby, Michigan. It is part of the Shelby Public Schools.

== Notable alumni ==
- Paul Griffin, NBA basketball player
- Wayne Static, musician
