= Newfield Township, Michigan =

- Township
- Location within the state of Michigan Newfield Township, Michigan (the United States)
- Coordinates: 43°35′45″N 86°5′11″W
- Country: United States
- State: Michigan
- County: Oceana

Area
  - Total: 35.7 sq mi (92.5 km^{2})
  - Land: 35.1 sq mi (90.8 km^{2})
  - Water: 0.66 sq mi (1.7 km^{2})
- Elevation: 791 ft (241 m)

Population (2020)
  - Total: 2,329
  - Density: 66.4/sq mi (25.6/km^{2})
- Time zone: UTC-5 (Eastern (EST))
  - Summer (DST): UTC-4 (EDT)
- FIPS code: 26-57300
- GNIS feature ID: 1626800
- Website: https://newfieldtownship.org/

Newfield Township is a civil township of Oceana County in the U.S. state of Michigan. As of the 2020 census, the township had a population of 2,329.

== Communities ==
- Hesperia is a village in the southeast corner of the township on the boundary with Denver township in Newaygo County and is approximately evenly divided between them.
- Gale was a post office here from 1899 until 1906.

== Geography ==
According to the United States Census Bureau, the township has a total area of 35.7 square miles (92 km^{2}), of which, 35.1 square miles (91 km^{2}) of it is land and 0.6 square miles (1.6 km^{2}) of it (1.82%) is water.

== Demographics ==
As of the census of 2000, there were 2,483 people, 949 households, and 692 families residing in the township. The population density was 70.8 inhabitants per square mile (27.3/km^{2}). There were 1,322 housing units at an average density of 37.7 per square mile (14.6/km^{2}). The racial makeup of the township was 95.65% White, 0.20% African American, 0.89% Native American, 0.64% Asian, 1.29% from other races, and 1.33% from two or more races. Hispanic or Latino of any race were 2.38% of the population.

There were 949 households, out of which 34.4% had children under the age of 18 living with them, 60.0% were married couples living together, 9.1% had a female householder with no husband present, and 27.0% were non-families. 22.4% of all households were made up of individuals, and 10.4% had someone living alone who was 65 years of age or older. The average household size was 2.62 and the average family size was 3.07.

In the township, the population was spread out, with 28.4% under the age of 18, 7.0% from 18 to 24, 26.7% from 25 to 44, 24.7% from 45 to 64, and 13.2% who were 65 years of age or older. The median age was 37 years. For every 100 females, there were 100.4 males. For every 100 females age 18 and over, there were 96.9 males.

The median income for a household in the township was $30,547, and the median income for a family was $35,762. Males had a median income of $30,855 versus $20,545 for females. The per capita income for the township was $14,054. About 12.1% of families and 15.5% of the population were below the poverty line, including 22.0% of those under age 18 and 7.4% of those age 65 or over.
