= Hart Township, Michigan =

- Township
- Location within the state of Michigan Hart Township, Michigan (the United States)
- Coordinates: 43°41′35″N 86°20′41″W
- Country: United States
- State: Michigan
- County: Oceana

Area
  - Total: 34.2 sq mi (88.7 km^{2})
  - Land: 33.9 sq mi (87.8 km^{2})
  - Water: 0.35 sq mi (0.9 km^{2})
- Elevation: 719 ft (219 m)

Population (2020)
  - Total: 2,028
  - Density: 59.8/sq mi (23.1/km^{2})
- Time zone: UTC-5 (Eastern (EST))
  - Summer (DST): UTC-4 (EDT)
- ZIP code: 49420
- Area code: 231
- FIPS code: 26-36940
- GNIS feature ID: 1626443
- Website: https://www.harttownship.org/

Hart Township is a civil township of Oceana County in the U.S. state of Michigan. The population was 2,028 at the 2020 census. The City of Hart is located within the township but is administratively autonomous.

== Geography ==
According to the United States Census Bureau, the township has a total area of 34.3 square miles (89 km^{2}), of which, 33.9 square miles (88 km^{2}) of it is land and 0.3 square miles (0.78 km^{2}) of it (0.99%) is water.

== Communities ==
- Corbin's Mill for a time beginning in 1865 this was the county seat of Oceana County.

== Demographics ==
As of the census of 2000, there were 2,026 people, 702 households, and 555 families residing in the township. The population density was 59.7 inhabitants per square mile (23.1/km^{2}). There were 853 housing units at an average density of 25.1 per square mile (9.7/km^{2}). The racial makeup of the township was 89.44% White, 0.39% African American, 0.79% Native American, 0.10% Asian, 5.92% from other races, and 3.36% from two or more races. Hispanic or Latino of any race were 13.38% of the population.

There were 702 households, out of which 36.3% had children under the age of 18 living with them, 65.1% were married couples living together, 9.8% had a female householder with no husband present, and 20.8% were non-families. 16.4% of all households were made up of individuals, and 8.0% had someone living alone who was 65 years of age or older. The average household size was 2.78 and the average family size was 3.11.

In the township the population was spread out, with 28.5% under the age of 18, 7.6% from 18 to 24, 25.9% from 25 to 44, 23.3% from 45 to 64, and 14.8% who were 65 years of age or older. The median age was 37 years. For every 100 females, there were 100.8 males. For every 100 females age 18 and over, there were 98.8 males.

The median income for a household in the township was $37,434, and the median income for a family was $41,053. Males had a median income of $33,333 versus $20,658 for females. The per capita income for the township was $15,625. About 10.6% of families and 14.2% of the population were below the poverty line, including 19.7% of those under age 18 and 7.0% of those age 65 or over.

== Education ==
Most of Hart Township is in Hart Public School District while small portions to the south are in Shelby Public Schools.
