= Elbridge Township, Michigan =

- Township
- Location within the state of Michigan Elbridge Township, Michigan (the United States)
- Coordinates: 43°40′45″N 86°13′41″W
- Country: United States
- State: Michigan
- County: Oceana

Area
  - Total: 36.3 sq mi (93.9 km^{2})
  - Land: 36.2 sq mi (93.7 km^{2})
  - Water: 0.077 sq mi (0.2 km^{2})
- Elevation: 942 ft (287 m)

Population (2020)
  - Total: 999
  - Density: 27.6/sq mi (10.7/km^{2})
- Time zone: UTC-5 (Eastern (EST))
  - Summer (DST): UTC-4 (EDT)
- FIPS code: 26-25200
- GNIS feature ID: 1626223
- Website: https://elbridgetownship.org/

Elbridge Township is a civil township of Oceana County in the U.S. state of Michigan. The population was 999 at the 2020 census.

== History ==
Elbridge Township was part of the Ottawa Indian Reservation created by treaty in 1855. The township was organized in 1858.

== Communities ==
- Elbridge was a community that had a post office from 1883 until 1905.
- Elwood was a lumber settlement in the township. It had a post office from 1898 until 1901.

== Geography ==
According to the United States Census Bureau, the township has a total area of 36.3 square miles (94 km^{2}), of which, 36.2 square miles (94 km^{2}) of it is land and 0.1 square miles (0.26 km^{2}) of it (0.22%) is water.

== Demographics ==
As of the 2010 census Elbridge Township had a population of 971. The ethnic and racial composition of the population was 82.3% non-Hispanic white, 0.3% African American, 0.7% Native American, 0.1% Asian, 16.1% Hispanic or Latino and 1.3% reporting two or more races.

As of the census of 2000, there were 1,233 people, 344 households, and 259 families residing in the township. The population density was 34.1 inhabitants per square mile (13.2/km^{2}). There were 451 housing units at an average density of 12.5 per square mile (4.8/km^{2}). The racial makeup of the township was 80.45% White, 0.41% African American, 0.89% Native American, 14.52% from other races, and 3.73% from two or more races. Hispanic or Latino of any race were 24.90% of the population.

There were 344 households, out of which 36.6% had children under the age of 18 living with them, 59.6% were married couples living together, 9.6% had a female householder with no husband present, and 24.7% were non-families. 19.5% of all households were made up of individuals, and 9.0% had someone living alone who was 65 years of age or older. The average household size was 2.95 and the average family size was 3.36.

In the township the population was spread out, with 28.5% under the age of 18, 9.7% from 18 to 24, 25.8% from 25 to 44, 19.1% from 45 to 64, and 16.9% who were 65 years of age or older. The median age was 35 years. For every 100 females, there were 106.2 males. For every 100 females age 18 and over, there were 100.2 males.

The median income for a household in the township was $31,838, and the median income for a family was $35,662. Males had a median income of $30,658 versus $23,750 for females. The per capita income for the township was $11,755. About 14.7% of families and 25.4% of the population were below the poverty line, including 24.3% of those under age 18 and 38.9% of those age 65 or over.
