= Grant Township, Oceana County, Michigan =

Grant Township, Michigan
- Township
- Location within the state of Michigan Grant Township, Michigan (the United States)
- Coordinates: 43°30′56″N 86°20′24″W
- Country: United States
- State: Michigan
- County: Oceana

Area
  - Total: 35.8 sq mi (92.7 km^{2})
  - Land: 35.4 sq mi (91.7 km^{2})
  - Water: 0.42 sq mi (1.1 km^{2})
- Elevation: 699 ft (213 m)

Population (2020)
  - Total: 3,002
  - Density: 84.8/sq mi (32.7/km^{2})
- Time zone: UTC-5 (Eastern (EST))
  - Summer (DST): UTC-4 (EDT)
- FIPS code: 26-34400
- GNIS feature ID: 1626386
- Website: Township website

Grant Township is a civil township of Oceana County in the U.S. state of Michigan. As of the 2020 census, the township population was 3,002.

== Communities ==
- Cranston was a rural post office in the township from 1886 until 1901.

== Geography ==
According to the United States Census Bureau, the township has a total area of 35.8 square miles (93 km^{2}), of which, 35.4 square miles (92 km^{2}) of it is land and 0.4 square miles (1.0 km^{2}) of it (1.15%) is water.

== Demographics ==
As of the census of 2000, there were 2,932 people, 1,034 households, and 801 families residing in the township. The population density was 82.9 inhabitants per square mile (32.0/km^{2}). There were 1,155 housing units at an average density of 32.6 per square mile (12.6/km^{2}). The racial makeup of the township was 91.03% White, 0.38% African American, 1.74% Native American, 0.75% Asian, 5.01% from other races, and 1.09% from two or more races. Hispanic or Latino of any race were 10.40% of the population.

There were 1,034 households, out of which 39.4% had children under the age of 18 living with them, 59.8% were married couples living together, 10.6% had a female householder with no husband present, and 22.5% were non-families. 18.3% of all households were made up of individuals, and 6.0% had someone living alone who was 65 years of age or older. The average household size was 2.81 and the average family size was 3.15.

In the township the population was spread out, with 30.4% under the age of 18, 7.5% from 18 to 24, 29.7% from 25 to 44, 21.9% from 45 to 64, and 10.4% who were 65 years of age or older. The median age was 35 years. For every 100 females, there were 104.3 males. For every 100 females age 18 and over, there were 102.0 males.

The median income for a household in the township was $37,594, and the median income for a family was $40,297. Males had a median income of $31,975 versus $25,724 for females. The per capita income for the township was $15,267. About 14.7% of families and 15.4% of the population were below the poverty line, including 23.1% of those under age 18 and 6.0% of those age 65 or over.
