= Leavitt Township, Michigan =

- Township
- Location within the state of Michigan Leavitt Township, Michigan (the United States)
- Coordinates: 43°42′2″N 86°6′32″W
- Country: United States
- State: Michigan
- County: Oceana

Area
  - Total: 35.9 sq mi (93.0 km^{2})
  - Land: 35.3 sq mi (91.3 km^{2})
  - Water: 0.62 sq mi (1.6 km^{2})
- Elevation: 827 ft (252 m)

Population (2020)
  - Total: 911
  - Density: 25.8/sq mi (9.98/km^{2})
- Time zone: UTC-5 (Eastern (EST))
  - Summer (DST): UTC-4 (EDT)
- FIPS code: 26-46560
- GNIS feature ID: 1626596
- Website: https://www.leavitttownship.org/

Leavitt Township is a civil township of Oceana County in the U.S. state of Michigan. The population was 911 at the 2020 census. It is a primarily agricultural area, with Walkerville being the only village within the township.

== Geography ==
According to the United States Census Bureau, the township has a total area of 35.9 square miles (93 km^{2}), of which, 35.3 square miles (91 km^{2}) of it is land and 0.6 square miles (1.6 km^{2}) of it (1.75%) is water.

== Communities ==
- Bird is an unincorporated community in Leavitt Township. It was settled by European Americans in 1866 and had a US post office from 1872 until 1890.

== Demographics ==
As of the census of 2000, there were 845 people, 309 households, and 232 families residing in the township. The population density was 24.0 inhabitants per square mile (9.3/km^{2}). There were 418 housing units at an average density of 11.9 per square mile (4.6/km^{2}). The racial makeup of the township was 89.59% White, 1.18% African American, 1.07% Native American, 5.68% from other races, and 2.49% from two or more races. Hispanic or Latino of any race were 11.72% of the population.

There were 309 households, out of which 38.5% had children under the age of 18 living with them, 58.6% were married couples living together, 11.0% had a female householder with no husband present, and 24.6% were non-families. 21.4% of all households were made up of individuals, and 7.4% had someone living alone who was 65 years of age or older. The average household size was 2.73 and the average family size was 3.12.

In the township the population was spread out, with 30.3% under the age of 18, 8.8% from 18 to 24, 28.5% from 25 to 44, 21.2% from 45 to 64, and 11.2% who were 65 years of age or older. The median age was 35 years. For every 100 females, there were 99.3 males. For every 100 females age 18 and over, there were 96.3 males.

The median income for a household in the township was $30,179, and the median income for a family was $33,750. Males had a median income of $31,761 versus $20,917 for females. The per capita income for the township was $13,570. About 13.1% of families and 17.8% of the population were below the poverty line, including 21.1% of those under age 18 and 11.1% of those age 65 or over.

== History ==
Originally part of Elbridge Township, Leavitt Township was separated and named for Hazen Leavitt, the first settler in the area, who arrived in 1864. A descendant of Thomas Leavitt, one of the first English settlers of New Hampshire, Hazen Leavitt was born in Percy, Coos County, New Hampshire. The following year settlers David Lampson and John Henning arrived, likely with their families.

By the 21st century, the rural area was known for its asparagus crops. It has attracted Hispanic workers in agriculture.
