= Shelby Township, Michigan =

Shelby, Michigan
- Township
- Location within the state of Michigan Shelby, Michigan (the United States)
- Coordinates: 43°36′18″N 86°21′22″W
- Country: United States
- State: Michigan
- County: Oceana

Area
  - Total: 36.1 sq mi (93 km^{2})
  - Land: 36.0 sq mi (93 km^{2})
  - Water: 0.1 sq mi (0.26 km^{2})
- Elevation: 994 ft (303 m)

Population (2020)
  - Total: 4,109
  - Density: 114/sq mi (44.1/km^{2})
- Time zone: UTC−5 (Eastern (EST))
  - Summer (DST): UTC−4 (EDT)
- ZIP Code: 49455
- Area code: 231
- FIPS code: 26-72860
- GNIS feature ID: 1627063
- Website: www.shelbytownshipoceana.com

Shelby is a civil township of Oceana County in the U.S. state of Michigan. The population was 4,109 at the 2020 census.

== Geography ==
According to the United States Census Bureau, the township has a total area of 36.1 square miles (93.5 km^{2}), of which, 36.0 square miles (93.2 km^{2}) is land and 0.1 square miles (0.3 km^{2}) is water.

== Demographics ==
As of the census of 2000, there were 3,951 people, 1,388 households, and 1,059 families residing in the township. The population density was 109.8 per square mile (42.4/km^{2}). There were 1,502 housing units at an average density of 41.7 per square mile (16.1/km^{2}). The racial makeup of the township was 86.84% White, 0.10% African American, 1.11% Native American, 0.08% Asian, 0.10% Pacific Islander, 9.64% from other races, and 2.13% from two or more races. Hispanic or Latino people of any race were 18.32% of the population.

There were 1,388 households, out of which 38.0% had children under the age of 18 living with them, 62.3% were married couples living together, 10.7% had a female householder with no husband present, and 23.7% were non-families. 20.7% of all households were made up of individuals, and 11.7% had someone living alone who was 65 years of age or older. The average household size was 2.82 and the average family size was 3.26.

By age, 30.5% of the population was under 18, 9.2% from 18 to 24, 25.8% from 25 to 44, 20.9% from 45 to 64, and 13.6% were 65 or older. The median age was 35 years. For every 100 females, there were 94.2 males. For every 100 females age 18 and over, there were 88.8 males.

The median income for a household in the township was $35,078, and the median income for a family was $43,835. Males had a median income of $31,568 versus $23,750 for females. The per capita income for the township was $15,501. About 8.6% of families and 11.9% of the population were below the poverty line, including 17.4% of those under age 18 and 6.3% of those age 65 or over.

== References and further reading ==
- Fisher, Dale (2003). Building Michigan: A Tribute to Michigan's Construction Industry. Grass Lake, MI: Eyry of the Eagle Publishing. ISBN 1-891143-24-7.
