= Crystal Township, Oceana County, Michigan =

Crystal Township, Michigan
- Township
- Location within the state of Michigan Crystal Township, Michigan (the United States)
- Coordinates: 43°46′30″N 86°13′25″W
- Country: United States
- State: Michigan
- County: Oceana

Area
  - Total: 36.0 sq mi (93.3 km^{2})
  - Land: 36.0 sq mi (93.3 km^{2})
  - Water: 0 sq mi (0.0 km^{2})
- Elevation: 814 ft (248 m)

Population (2020)
  - Total: 681
  - Density: 18.9/sq mi (7.30/km^{2})
- Time zone: UTC-5 (Eastern (EST))
  - Summer (DST): UTC-4 (EDT)
- FIPS code: 26-19100
- GNIS feature ID: 1626145

Crystal Township is a civil township of Oceana County in the U.S. state of Michigan. As of the 2020 census, the township population was 681.

== History ==
This area was one of the locations the Ottawa were moved to from Ionia County, Michigan in the late 1850s. The township was established in 1866.

== Communities ==
- Crystal Valley is an unincorporated community on Crystal Creek at 43°46′26″N 86°14′15″W. A post office opened July 14, 1871, and operated until February 28, 1954. The Jared H. Gay house (built in 1861), which is Michigan's the oldest continually occupied log cabin in its original location is in the Crystal Valley community.
- Elmwood is an area of the township that was first settled in 1873 and had a school built in 1876.
- Beanville was a former place in the township. It was founded in 1878 by John Bean, Jr. when he built a sawmill and general store there. The current mayor is Ryan Seil.

== Geography ==
According to the United States Census Bureau, the township has a total area of 36.0 square miles (93 km^{2}), of which, 36.0 square miles (93 km^{2}) of it is land and 0.03% is water.

== Demographics ==
As of the census of 2000, there were 832 people, 239 households, and 182 families residing in the township. The population density was 23.1 inhabitants per square mile (8.9/km^{2}). There were 404 housing units at an average density of 11.2 per square mile (4.3/km^{2}). The racial makeup of the township was 79.45% White, 0.24% African American, 1.80% Native American, 0.12% Asian, 0.12% Pacific Islander, 14.90% from other races, and 3.37% from two or more races. Hispanic or Latino of any race were 31.13% of the population.

There were 239 households, out of which 42.3% had children under the age of 18 living with them, 61.1% were married couples living together, 7.9% had a female householder with no husband present, and 23.8% were non-families. 18.4% of all households were made up of individuals, and 8.8% had someone living alone who was 65 years of age or older. The average household size was 3.03 and the average family size was 3.48.

In the township the population was spread out, with 34.0% under the age of 18, 10.2% from 18 to 24, 29.3% from 25 to 44, 18.8% from 45 to 64, and 7.7% who were 65 years of age or older. The median age was 28 years. For every 100 females, there were 108.0 males. For every 100 females age 18 and over, there were 118.7 males.

The median income for a household in the township was $31,719, and the median income for a family was $37,955. Males had a median income of $30,417 versus $17,813 for females. The per capita income for the township was $10,899. About 14.8% of families and 22.8% of the population were below the poverty line, including 20.9% of those under age 18 and 21.9% of those age 65 or over.
