= Hesperia, Michigan =

- Village
- Location of Hesperia, Michigan
- Coordinates: 43°34′08″N 86°02′22″W
- Country: United States
- State: Michigan
- Counties: Oceana, Newaygo

Area
  - Total: 0.86 sq mi (2.22 km^{2})
  - Land: 0.82 sq mi (2.12 km^{2})
  - Water: 0.039 sq mi (0.10 km^{2})
- Elevation: 745 ft (227 m)

Population (2020)
  - Total: 1,034
  - Density: 1,263.9/sq mi (487.99/km^{2})
- Time zone: UTC-5 (Eastern (EST))
  - Summer (DST): UTC-4 (EDT)
- ZIP code: 49421
- Area code: 231
- FIPS code: 26-37860
- GNIS feature ID: 1620176
- Website: Hesperia

Hesperia is a village in Newaygo and Oceana Counties in the U.S. state of Michigan; it is also the only village in Newaygo County. About half of the village lies in Newfield Township in Oceana County and half in Denver Township in Newaygo County. The population was determined to be 954 in both the 2000 and 2010 Census, rising to 967 in the 2020 census.

== Geography ==
According to the United States Census Bureau, the village has a total area of 0.86 square miles (2.23 km^{2}), of which 0.79 square miles (2.05 km^{2}) is land and 0.07 square miles (0.18 km^{2}) is water.

=== Major highways ===
- M-20 passes east–west through the village.
- M-120 runs along the Newaygo–Oceana county line to Hesperia, where it has its northern terminus at M-20.

== Climate ==
This climatic region is typified by large seasonal temperature differences, with warm to hot (and often humid) summers and cold (sometimes severely cold) winters. According to the Köppen Climate Classification system, Hesperia has a humid continental climate, abbreviated "Dfb" on climate maps.

== Demographics ==
Historical population
Census	Pop.	Note	%±
1880	147		—
1890	506		244.2%
1900	474		−6.3%
1910	462		−2.5%
1920	439		−5.0%
1930	467		6.4%
1940	535		14.6%
1950	760		42.1%
1960	822		8.2%
1970	877		6.7%
1980	876		−0.1%
1990	846		−3.4%
2000	954		12.8%
2010	954		0.0%
2020	1,034		8.4%
U.S. Decennial Census

The 2010 American Community Survey 5-year estimate indicates the median income for a household in the village was $30,104 and the median income for a family was $32,500. Males had a median income of $21,809 versus $12,083 for females. The per capita income for the village was $14,471. About 12.9% of families and 19.4% of the population were below the poverty line, including 21.1% of those under the age 18 and 7.3% of those age 65 or over.

=== 2010 census ===
The 2010 United States census indicates Hesperia had a 2010 population of 954. There was no change in the population from the 2000 United States census. In 2010 there were 382 households and 231 families in the village. The population density was 1,211.5 per square mile (467.8 square kilometers). There were 431 housing units at an average density of 547.3 per square mile (211.3 square kilometers). The racial and ethnic makeup of the village was 88.5% White, 0.0% Black or African American, 1.0% Native American, 0.1% Asian, 8.1% Hispanic or Latino, 0.0% from other races, and 2.3% from two or more races.

There were 382 households, of which 34.0% had children under the age of 18 living with them, 39.8% were husband and wife families, 13.4% had a female householder with no husband present, 39.5% were non-families, and 34.8% were made up of individuals. The average household size was 2.45 and the average family size was 3.14.

In the village, the population was spread out, with 27.0% under age of 18, 10.7% from 18 to 24, 21.3% from 25 to 44, 24.8% from 45 to 64, and 16.1% who were 65 years of age or older. The median age was 36 years. For every 100 females, there were 78.7 males. For every 100 females age 18 and over, there were 78 males.

== Government ==
The Village of Hesperia political body consists of a Village President, six Council members, a Clerk, and a Treasurer.

Elected and Appointed Officials:

- Michael Farber - Village President
- Vicki R. Burrell - Village Clerk
- Joann Borgman - Village Treasurer
- Joel Catts - Police Chief
- Todd Hren - DPW Supervisor

Trustees:

- Joyce McDonald
- Mike Farber
- Dan Herin
- Sheri Hunt
- Jackie Slocum
- Donald Bostrum
- Jennifer Nearanz
