= Benona Township, Michigan =

- Township
- Location within the state of Michigan Benona Township, Michigan (the United States)
- Coordinates: 43°35′57″N 86°27′48″W
- Country: United States
- State: Michigan
- County: Oceana

Area
  - Total: 41.3 sq mi (106.9 km^{2})
  - Land: 40.8 sq mi (105.6 km^{2})
  - Water: 0.50 sq mi (1.3 km^{2})
- Elevation: 709 ft (216 m)

Population (2020)
  - Total: 1,425
  - Density: 35/sq mi (13.4/km^{2})
- Time zone: UTC-5 (Eastern (EST))
  - Summer (DST): UTC-4 (EDT)
- FIPS code: 26-07300
- GNIS feature ID: 1625914
- Website: https://benonatownship.org/

Benona Township is a civil township of Oceana County in the U.S. state of Michigan. As of the 2020 census, the township population was 1,425.

== History ==
A sawmill was established here in 1849. Early on it was called New Stony Creek as it was located on a stream of that name. However, the postmaster Amos R. Wheeler convinced the legislature to rename the place Benona after a legendary Potawatamie lady.

== Geography ==
According to the United States Census Bureau, the township has a total area of 41.3 square miles (107 km^{2}), of which, 40.8 square miles (106 km^{2}) of it is land and 0.5 square miles (1.3 km^{2}) of it (1.19%) is water.

== Demographics ==
As of the 2010 census Benona Township had a population of 1,437. The ethnic and racial makeup of the population was 91.0% non-Hispanic white, 0.1% African American, 0.4% Native American, 0.6% Asian, 1.3% from two or more races and 7.2% Hispanic.

As of the census of 2000, there were 1,520 people, 583 households, and 429 families residing in the township. The population density was 37.3 inhabitants per square mile (14.4/km^{2}). There were 1,223 housing units at an average density of 30.0 units per square mile (11.6 units/km^{2}). The racial makeup of the township was 92.63% White, 0.46% African American, 0.13% Native American, 0.07% Asian, 6.18% from other races, and 0.53% from two or more races. Hispanic or Latino of any race were 10.13% of the population.

There were 583 households, out of which 29.2% had children under the age of 18 living with them, 63.0% were married couples living together, 6.5% had a female householder with no husband present, and 26.4% were non-families. 22.0% of all households were made up of individuals, and 8.9% had someone living alone who was 65 years of age or older. The average household size was 2.55 and the average family size was 2.97.

In the township the population was spread out, with 25.5% under the age of 18, 7.0% from 18 to 24, 24.7% from 25 to 44, 26.1% from 45 to 64, and 16.7% who were 65 years of age or older. The median age was 40 years. For every 100 females, there were 105.4 males. For every 100 females age 18 and over, there were 106.8 males.

The median income for a household in the township was $44,375, and the median income for a family was $48,750. Males had a median income of $33,563 versus $25,515 for females. The per capita income for the township was $24,724. About 8.8% of families and 11.1% of the population were below the poverty line, including 12.7% of those under age 18 and 4.0% of those age 65 or over.
