= Greenwood Township, Oceana County, Michigan =

Greenwood Township, Michigan
- Township
- Location within the state of Michigan Greenwood Township, Michigan (the United States)
- Coordinates: 43°31′5″N 86°5′22″W
- Country: United States
- State: Michigan
- County: Oceana

Area
  - Total: 36.0 sq mi (93.2 km^{2})
  - Land: 35.8 sq mi (92.7 km^{2})
  - Water: 0.15 sq mi (0.4 km^{2})
- Elevation: 696 ft (212 m)

Population (2020)
  - Total: 1,156
  - Density: 32.3/sq mi (12.5/km^{2})
- Time zone: UTC-5 (Eastern (EST))
  - Summer (DST): UTC-4 (EDT)
- FIPS code: 26-35160
- GNIS feature ID: 1626403
- Website: https://greenwoodoceanami.gov/

Greenwood Township is a civil township of Oceana County in the U.S. state of Michigan. As of the 2020 census, the township population was 1,156.

== Geography ==
According to the United States Census Bureau, the township has a total area of 36.0 square miles (93 km^{2}), of which, 35.8 square miles (93 km^{2}) of it is land and 0.2 square miles (0.52 km^{2}) of it (0.44%) is water.

== History ==
Greenwood Township was established in 1858.

== Communities ==
- Forest City is an unincorporated community first settled in 1855. It had a post office from 1859 until 1975.

== Demographics ==
As of the census of 2000, there were 1,154 people, 392 households, and 310 families residing in the township. The population density was 32.2 inhabitants per square mile (12.4/km^{2}). There were 461 housing units at an average density of 12.9 per square mile (5.0/km^{2}). The racial makeup of the township was 96.01% White, 0.09% African American, 0.69% Native American, 0.26% Asian, 1.82% from other races, and 1.13% from two or more races. Hispanic or Latino of any race were 2.60% of the population.

There were 392 households, out of which 41.3% had children under the age of 18 living with them, 63.3% were married couples living together, 10.7% had a female householder with no husband present, and 20.9% were non-families. 16.1% of all households were made up of individuals, and 6.9% had someone living alone who was 65 years of age or older. The average household size was 2.94 and the average family size was 3.29.

In the township the population was spread out, with 31.2% under the age of 18, 10.3% from 18 to 24, 28.5% from 25 to 44, 22.0% from 45 to 64, and 8.0% who were 65 years of age or older. The median age was 32 years. For every 100 females, there were 101.0 males. For every 100 females age 18 and over, there were 99.5 males.

The median income for a household in the township was $36,964, and the median income for a family was $40,729. Males had a median income of $31,793 versus $21,818 for females. The per capita income for the township was $13,910. About 15.2% of families and 16.7% of the population were below the poverty line, including 22.8% of those under age 18 and 8.0% of those age 65 or over.
