= New Era, Michigan =

- Village
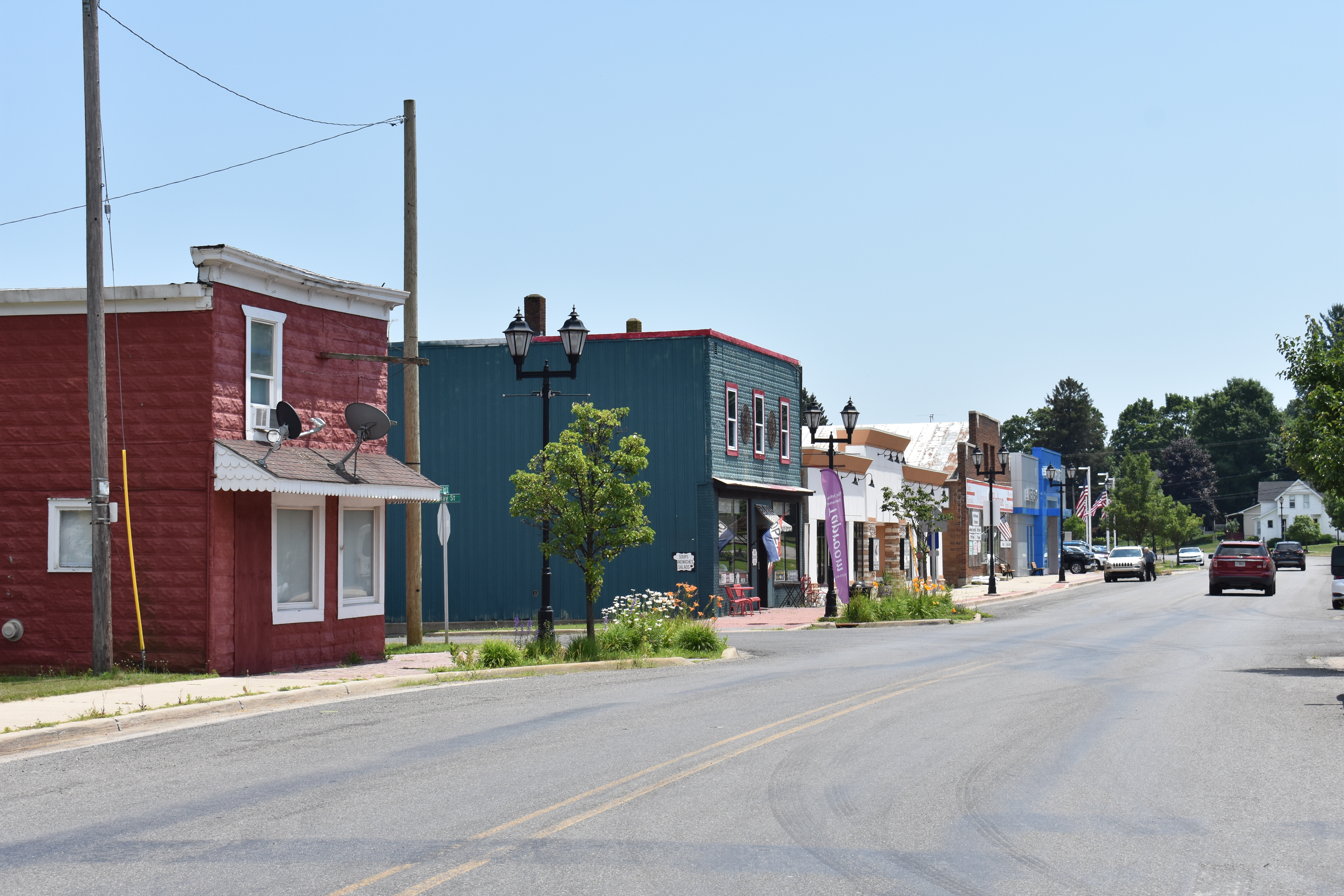
- New Era in July 2026

- Location of New Era, Michigan
- Coordinates: 43°33′34″N 86°20′45″W
- Country: United States
- State: Michigan
- County: Oceana

Area
  - Total: 0.84 sq mi (2.18 km^{2})
  - Land: 0.84 sq mi (2.17 km^{2})
  - Water: 0.0039 sq mi (0.01 km^{2})
- Elevation: 750 ft (230 m)

Population (2020)
  - Total: 446
  - Density: 531.8/sq mi (205.33/km^{2})
- Time zone: UTC-5 (Eastern (EST))
  - Summer (DST): UTC-4 (EDT)
- ZIP code: 49446
- Area code: 231
- FIPS code: 26-57280
- GNIS feature ID: 1621001
- Website: www.newerachamber.com

New Era is a village in Shelby Township, Oceana County in the U.S. state of Michigan. As of the 2020 census, New Era had a population of 446.

New Era is the birthplace of Caldecott Medal-winning children's author Verna Aardema. The village is near the halfway point on the Hart-Montague Trail, and local businesses woo visiting cyclists as they pass by along the trail. New Era is also home to dairy product manufacturer, Country Dairy.

== Geography ==
According to the United States Census Bureau, the village has a total area of 0.84 square miles (2.18 km^{2}), all land.

== Demographics ==
Historical population
Census	Pop.	Note	%±
1880	80		—
1950	247		—
1960	403		63.2%
1970	466		15.6%
1980	534		14.6%
1990	520		−2.6%
2000	461		−11.3%
2010	451		−2.2%
2020	446		−1.1%
U.S. Decennial Census

=== 2010 census ===
As of the census of 2010, there were 451 people, 173 households, and 129 families residing in the village. The population density was 536.9 inhabitants per square mile (207.3/km^{2}). There were 188 housing units at an average density of 223.8 per square mile (86.4/km^{2}). The racial makeup of the village was 96.2% White, 0.2% African American, 1.6% Native American, 0.4% Asian, 0.7% from other races, and 0.9% from two or more races. Hispanic or Latino of any race were 3.1% of the population.

There were 173 households, of which 32.9% had children under the age of 18 living with them, 65.3% were married couples living together, 7.5% had a female householder with no husband present, 1.7% had a male householder with no wife present, and 25.4% were non-families. 22.5% of all households were made up of individuals, and 9.2% had someone living alone who was 65 years of age or older. The average household size was 2.61 and the average family size was 3.06.

The median age in the village was 41.9 years. 27.1% of residents were under the age of 18; 7% were between the ages of 18 and 24; 20.4% were from 25 to 44; 27.7% were from 45 to 64; and 17.7% were 65 years of age or older. The gender makeup of the village was 50.1% male and 49.9% female.

=== 2000 census ===
As of the census of 2000, there were 461 people, 162 households, and 132 families residing in the village. The population density was 543.8 inhabitants per square mile (210.0/km^{2}). There were 169 housing units at an average density of 199.3 per square mile (77.0/km^{2}). The racial makeup of the village was 95.66% White, 0.22% Native American, 0.22% Asian, 1.52% from other races, and 2.39% from two or more races. Hispanic or Latino of any race were 4.34% of the population.

There were 162 households, out of which 37.7% had children under the age of 18 living with them, 71.6% were married couples living together, 7.4% had a female householder with no husband present, and 18.5% were non-families. 16.7% of all households were made up of individuals, and 10.5% had someone living alone who was 65 years of age or older. The average household size was 2.81 and the average family size was 3.20.

In the village, the population was spread out, with 29.9% under the age of 18, 6.9% from 18 to 24, 24.3% from 25 to 44, 24.1% from 45 to 64, and 14.8% who were 65 years of age or older. The median age was 37 years. For every 100 females, there were 99.6 males. For every 100 females age 18 and over, there were 92.3 males.

The median income for a household in the village was $45,909, and the median income for a family was $50,000. Males had a median income of $37,063 versus $25,000 for females. The per capita income for the village was $18,417. About 0.7% of families and 2.8% of the population were below the poverty line, including 4.1% of those under age 18 and 5.6% of those age 65 or over.
