= Shelby, Oceana County, Michigan =

Shelby, Michigan
- Village
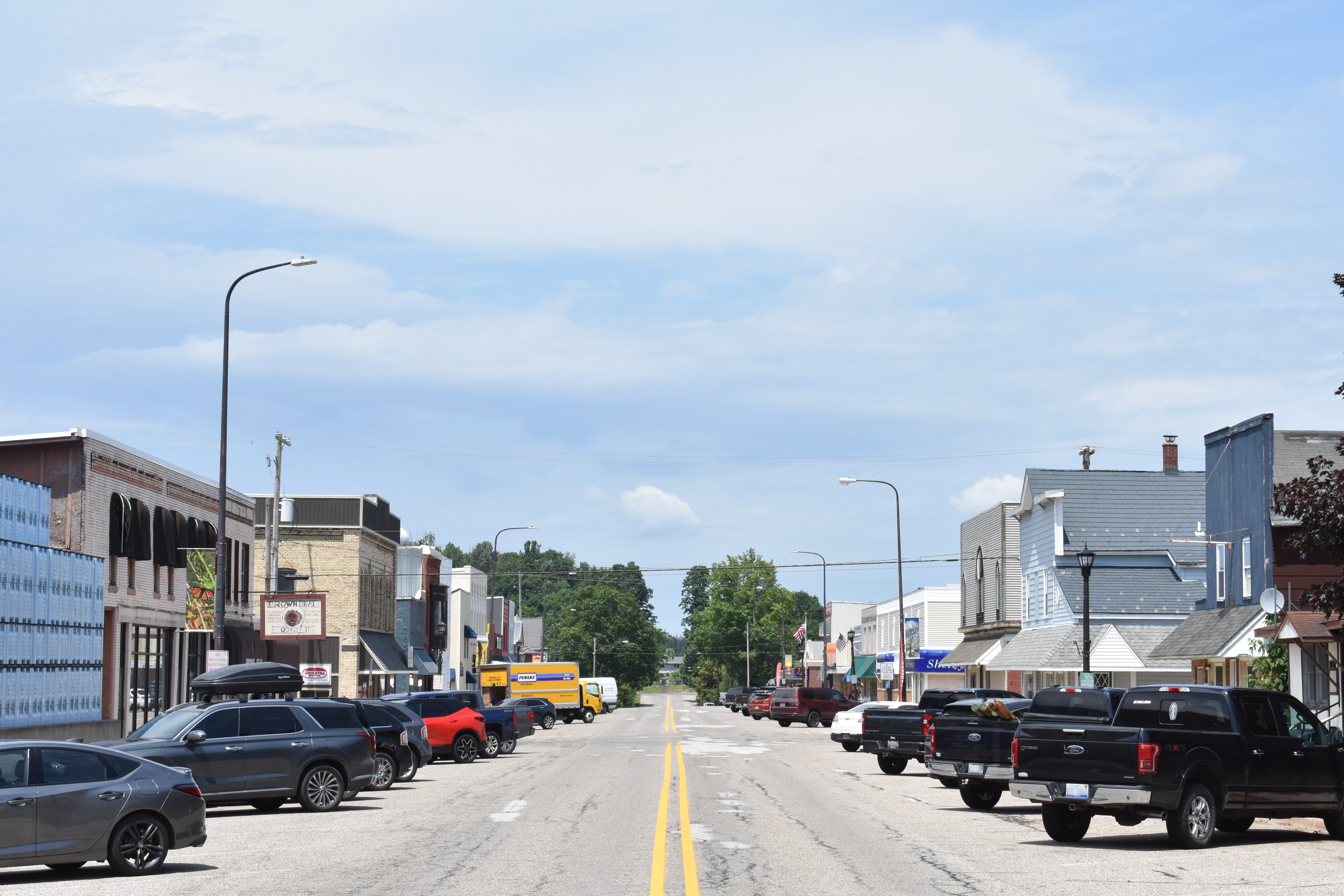
- Shelby in July 2026

- Location of Shelby, Michigan
- Coordinates: 43°36′42″N 86°21′52″W
- Country: United States
- State: Michigan
- County: Oceana

Area
  - Total: 1.64 sq mi (4.25 km^{2})
  - Land: 1.64 sq mi (4.25 km^{2})
  - Water: 0 sq mi (0.00 km^{2})
- Elevation: 817 ft (249 m)

Population (2020)
  - Total: 1,964
  - Density: 1,196/sq mi (461.8/km^{2})
- Time zone: UTC-5 (Eastern (EST))
  - Summer (DST): UTC-4 (EDT)
- ZIP code: 49455
- Area code: 231
- FIPS code: 26-72840
- GNIS feature ID: 1621579
- Website: Village website

Shelby is a village in Oceana County in the U.S. state of Michigan. The population was 2,065 at the 2010 census.

== Schools ==
Shelby Public Schools (Website) operate within the village boundaries. There are four schools which serve the village:

- Shelby High School (Website)
- Shelby Middle School
- Shelby Elementary School
- Shelby Early Childhood Center

== Geography ==
According to the United States Census Bureau, the village has a total area of 1.70 square miles (4.40 km^{2}), all land.

=== Major highways ===
- US 31 / LMCT is a freeway that runs west of the village.
- M-20 is a highway that runs and terminates south of the village

== Demographics ==
Historical population
Census	Pop.	Note	%±
1880	81		—
1890	994		1,127.2%
1900	1,081		8.8%
1910	1,260		16.6%
1920	1,288		2.2%
1930	1,152		−10.6%
1940	1,367		18.7%
1950	1,500		9.7%
1960	1,603		6.9%
1970	1,703		6.2%
1980	1,624		−4.6%
1990	1,871		15.2%
2000	1,914		2.3%
2010	2,065		7.9%
2020	1,964		−4.9%
U.S. Decennial Census

=== 2020 census ===
As of the 2020 United States census, there were 2,520 people living in the village. 42.7% were non-Hispanic White, 1.9% Black or African American, 0.1% Asian, 1.4% Native American, and 13.2% of two or more races. 51.6% were Hispanic or Latino (which makes it the highest percent and only community with a Hispanic-majority in the state).

=== 2010 census ===
As of the census of 2010, there were 2,065 people, 689 households, and 496 families living in the village. The population density was 1,214.7 inhabitants per square mile (469.0/km^{2}). There were 772 housing units at an average density of 454.1 per square mile (175.3/km^{2}). The racial makeup of the village was 68.7% White, 0.4% African American, 1.5% Native American, 0.2% Asian, 25.5% from other races, and 3.7% from two or more races. Hispanic or Latino of any race were 45.6% of the population.

There were 689 households, of which 41.8% had children under the age of 18 living with them, 51.8% were married couples living together, 13.6% had a female householder with no husband present, 6.5% had a male householder with no wife present, and 28.0% were non-families. 24.7% of all households were made up of individuals, and 13.8% had someone living alone who was 65 years of age or older. The average household size was 2.98 and the average family size was 3.56.

The median age in the village was 30.1 years. 33.2% of residents were under the age of 18; 10.1% were between the ages of 18 and 24; 24.7% were from 25 to 44; 19.5% were from 45 to 64; and 12.5% were 65 years of age or older. The gender makeup of the village was 47.9% male and 52.1% female.

=== 2000 census ===
As of the census of 2000, there were 1,914 people, 698 households, and 504 families living in the village. The population density was 1,098.8 inhabitants per square mile (424.2/km^{2}). There were 749 housing units at an average density of 430.0 per square mile (166.0/km^{2}). The racial makeup of the village was 81.35% White, 0.10% African American, 1.41% Native American, 0.05% Asian, 0.10% Pacific Islander, 15.41% from other races, and 1.57% from two or more races. Hispanic or Latino of any race were 27.27% of the population.

There were 698 households, out of which 38.3% had children under the age of 18 living with them, 55.0% were married couples living together, 13.6% had a female householder with no husband present, and 27.7% were non-families. 24.4% of all households were made up of individuals, and 14.6% had someone living alone who was 65 years of age or older. The average household size was 2.73 and the average family size was 3.26.

In the village, the population was spread out, with 31.5% under the age of 18, 10.3% from 18 to 24, 25.6% from 25 to 44, 17.9% from 45 to 64, and 14.7% who were 65 years of age or older. The median age was 33 years. For every 100 females, there were 88.0 males. For every 100 females age 18 and over, there were 80.6 males.

The median income for a household in the village was $28,710, and the median income for a family was $36,607. Males had a median income of $28,875 versus $21,300 for females. The per capita income for the village was $13,468. About 13.9% of families and 16.7% of the population were below the poverty line, including 24.1% of those under age 18 and 6.3% of those age 65 or over.

== Notable people ==
- Wayne Static

== See also ==
- Larry Paul Kelley
- Shelby Gem Factory
