= Oceana County, Michigan =

County in Michigan, United States

- County
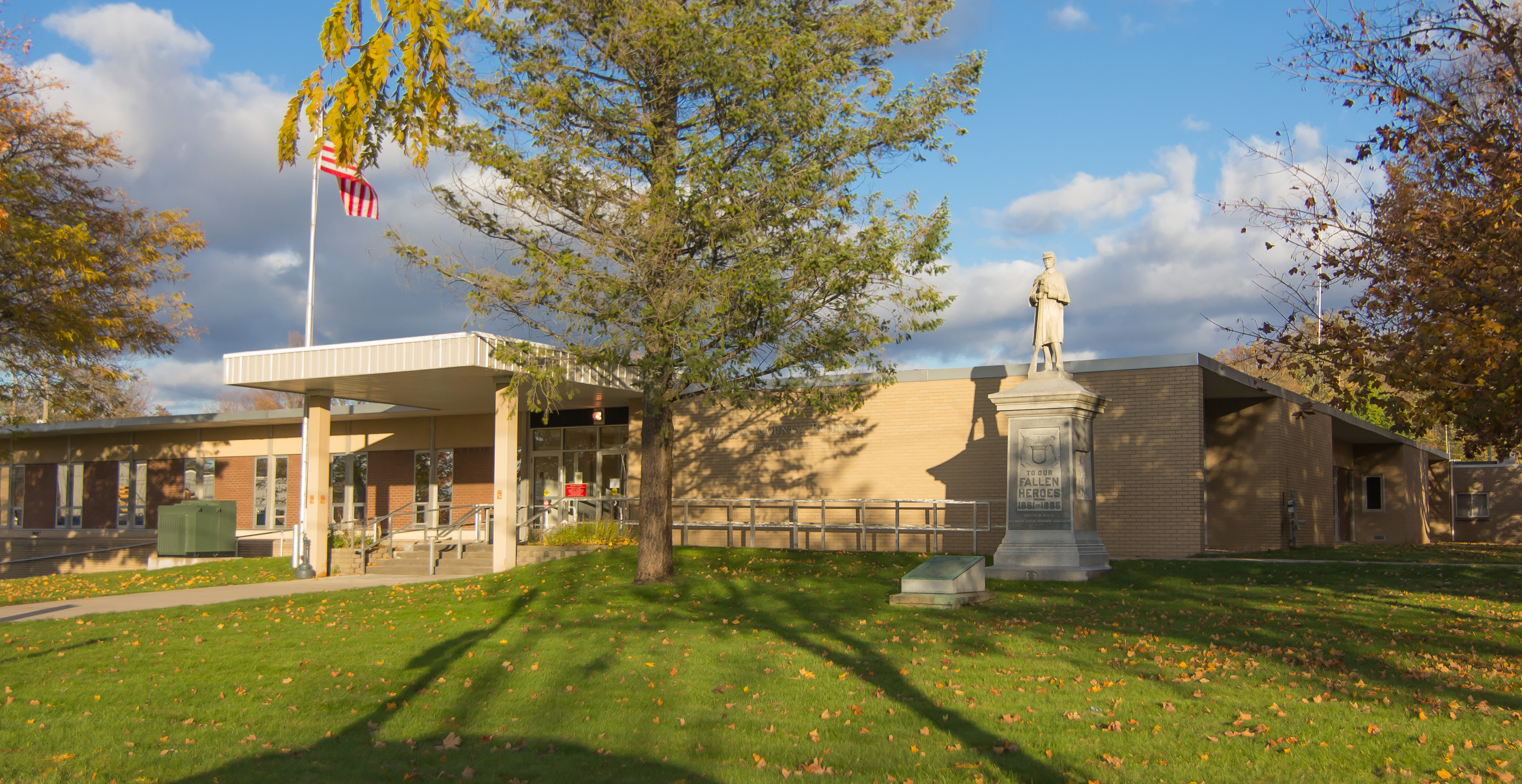
- Oceana County Courthouse

- Flag Seal

- Location within the U.S. state of Michigan
- Coordinates: 43°40′N 86°32′W
- Country: United States
- State: Michigan
- Created: 1840
- Organized: 1855
- Seat: Hart
- Largest city: Hart

Area
  - Total: 1,306 sq mi (3,380 km^{2})
  - Land: 512 sq mi (1,330 km^{2})
  - Water: 794 sq mi (2,060 km^{2}) 61%

Population (2020)
  - Total: 26,659
  - Estimate (2025): 27,177 ▲
  - Density: 53/sq mi (20/km^{2})
- Time zone: UTC−5 (Eastern)
  - Summer (DST): UTC−4 (EDT)
- Congressional district: 2nd
- Website: oceana.mi.us

Oceana County (/ˌoʊʃiˈænə/ OH-shee-AN-ə) is a county located in the U.S. state of Michigan. As of the 2020 Census, the population was 26,659. Its county seat and largest incorporated community is Hart. Oceana County is located in the West Michigan region of the state's Lower Peninsula. The county has a shoreline along Lake Michigan, which has allowed for agriculture and tourism to flourish within the county. The county is also known as the "Asparagus Capital of the World", and is home to the National Asparagus Festival, in Hart.

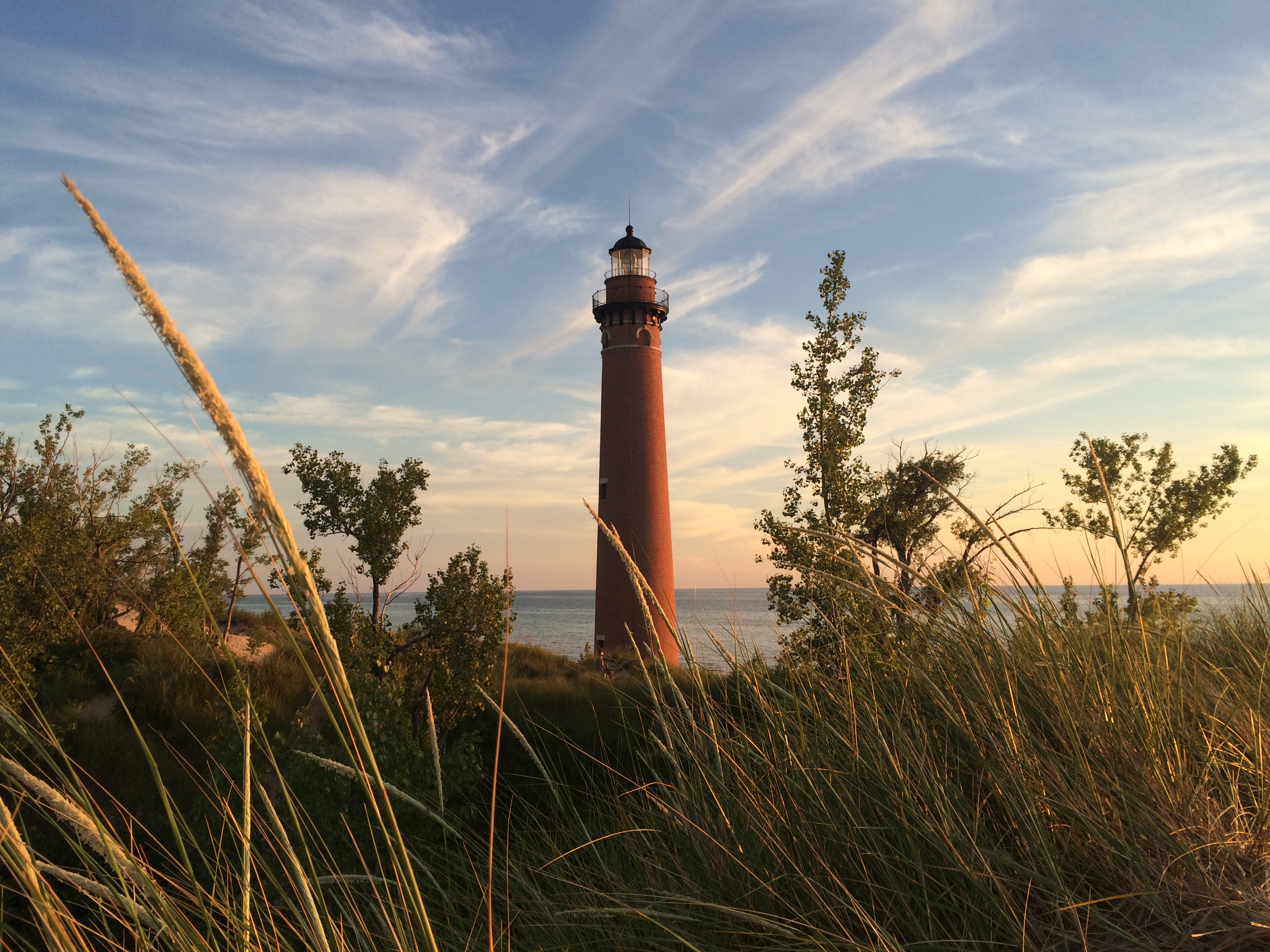
Little Sable Point Lighthouse

== History ==
Prior to European American settlement, Oceana County was part of the territory of the Ojibwe. Early European American settlers were attracted by access along the White River, which reaches its mouth on Lake Michigan in Muskegon County to the south.

The State of Michigan created the county of Oceana on April 1, 1840. The county was organized in 1855. The origin of the county's name is unclear, although there are two possibilities: the county may have been named for Lake Michigan, the freshwater "ocean," which forms its western border; or for the book Oceana, written by English author James Harrington in 1656.

In the 1850s about 1400 Odawa were relocated here from Ionia County, Michigan by the federal government.

The county economy was first built on the lumber trade, with logs floated downriver. It later was developed for agriculture. In the 21st century, it is known for its commodity crop of asparagus. Oceana County is famous as the "Asparagus Capital of the World" for its high production of asparagus. The annual Asparagus Festival includes a parade and crowning of the Asparagus Queen.

== Geography ==
According to the U.S. Census Bureau, the county has a total area of 1,306 square miles (3,380 km^{2}), of which 512 square miles (1,330 km^{2}) is land and 794 square miles (2,060 km^{2}) (61%) is water. The county is considered to be part of West Michigan. The county's western border is formed by Lake Michigan.

=== Adjacent counties ===
By land

- Mason County – north
- Lake County – northeast
- Newaygo County – east
- Muskegon County – south

By water

- Ozaukee County, Wisconsin – southwest
- Sheboygan County, Wisconsin – west

=== National protected area ===
- Manistee National Forest (part)

=== Major highways ===
- US 31 is a north–south freeway in the west of Oceana County. It passes Rothbury, New Era, Shelby, Mears, Hart, and Pentwater.
- Bus. US 31 is a business spur serving downtown Hart.
- M-20 is an east–west route in the south of the county. The highway's western terminus is at US 31 near New Era, and it continues easterly toward Hesperia, where it crosses into Newaygo County.
- M-120 is a north–south highway that runs due north from the county tri-point with Muskegon and Newaygo counties to an intersection with M-20 at Hesperia.

=== County-designated highways ===
- B-15 is a north–south county-designated highway that parallels the shoreline of Lake Michigan. The route enters the county from the south, and passes through Stony Lake and the Silver Lake area before ending at Pentwater.

== Demographics ==
This rural county reached a peak of population in 2000. It has attracted Hispanic or Latino immigrants who mostly work as farm laborers; in 2010 nearly 14% of the population was Hispanic.

Historical population
Census	Pop.	Note	%±
1840	496		—
1850	300		−39.5%
1860	1,816		505.3%
1870	7,222		297.7%
1880	11,699		62.0%
1890	15,698		34.2%
1900	16,644		6.0%
1910	18,379		10.4%
1920	15,601		−15.1%
1930	13,805		−11.5%
1940	14,812		7.3%
1950	16,105		8.7%
1960	16,547		2.7%
1970	17,984		8.7%
1980	22,002		22.3%
1990	22,454		2.1%
2000	26,873		19.7%
2010	26,570		−1.1%
2020	26,659		0.3%
2025 (est.)	27,177	▲	1.9%
US Decennial Census:

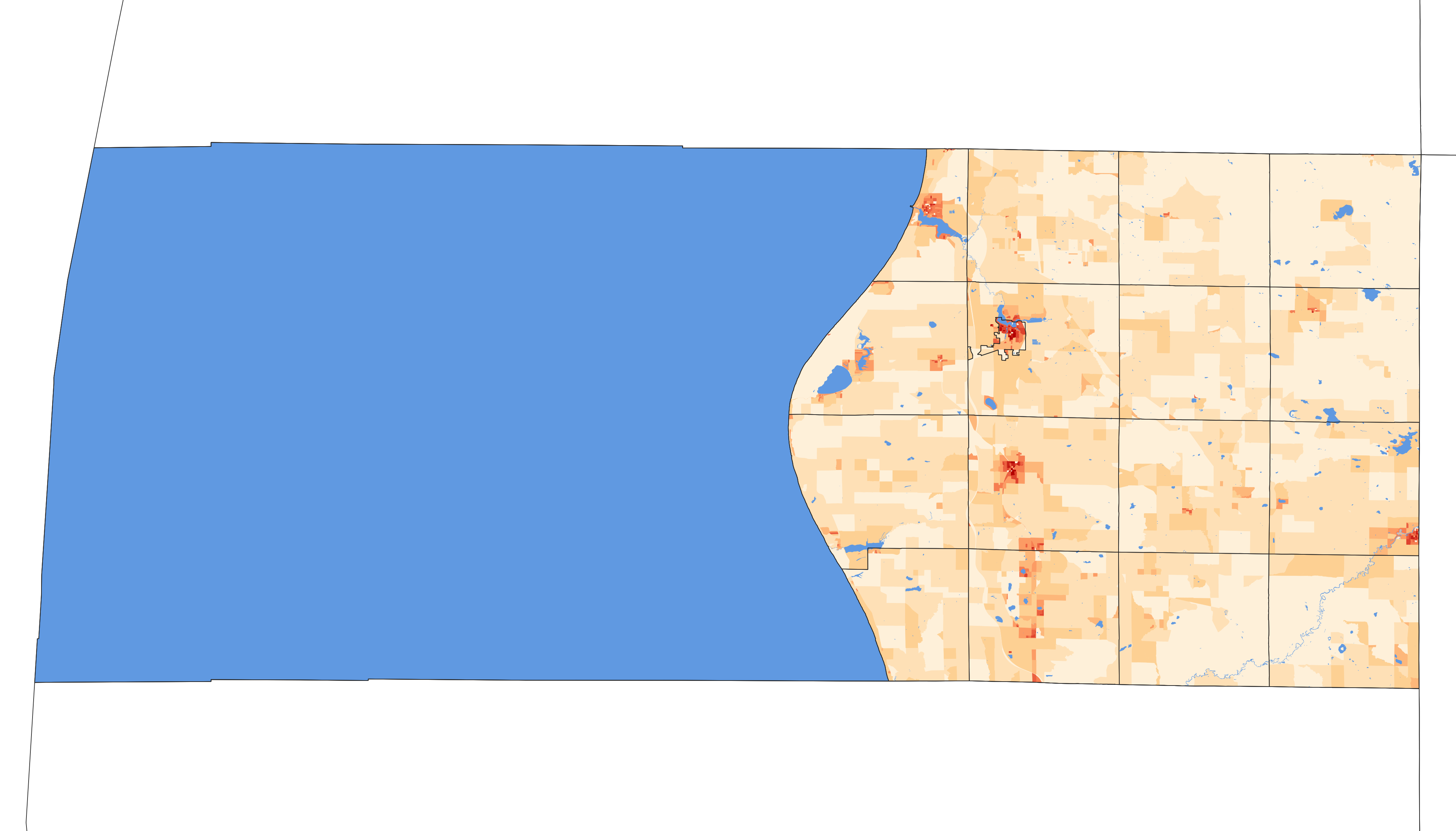
2020 population density of Oceana County MI by census block

=== Racial and ethnic composition ===
Oceana County, Michigan – Racial and ethnic composition Note: the US Census treats Hispanic/Latino as an ethnic category. This table excludes Latinos from the racial categories and assigns them to a separate category. Hispanics/Latinos may be of any race.
Race / Ethnicity (NH = Non-Hispanic)	Pop 1980	Pop 1990	Pop 2000	Pop 2010	Pop 2020	% 1980	% 1990	% 2000	% 2010	% 2020
White alone (NH)	20,563	20,729	23,066	22,227	21,191	93.46%	92.32%	85.83%	83.65%	79.49%
Black or African American alone (NH)	42	58	77	100	123	0.19%	0.26%	0.29%	0.38%	0.46%
Native American or Alaska Native alone (NH)	221	222	242	212	195	1.00%	0.99%	0.90%	0.80%	0.73%
Asian alone (NH)	33	39	66	60	69	0.15%	0.17%	0.25%	0.23%	0.26%
Native Hawaiian or Pacific Islander alone (NH)	x	x	8	4	4	x	x	0.03%	0.02%	0.02%
Other race alone (NH)	11	16	8	20	79	0.05%	0.07%	0.03%	0.08%	0.30%
Mixed race or Multiracial (NH)	x	x	287	318	890	x	x	1.07%	1.20%	3.34%
Hispanic or Latino (any race)	1,132	1,390	3,119	3,629	4,108	5.14%	6.19%	11.61%	13.66%	15.41%
Total	22,002	22,454	26,873	26,570	26,659	100.00%	100.00%	100.00%	100.00%	100.00%

=== 2020 census ===
As of the 2020 census, the county had a population of 26,659. The median age was 43.9 years. 22.6% of residents were under the age of 18 and 21.5% of residents were 65 years of age or older. For every 100 females there were 102.8 males, and for every 100 females age 18 and over there were 102.4 males age 18 and over.

The racial makeup of the county was 83.5% White, 0.5% Black or African American, 1.2% American Indian and Alaska Native, 0.3% Asian, <0.1% Native Hawaiian and Pacific Islander, 6.3% from some other race, and 8.2% from two or more races. Hispanic or Latino residents of any race comprised 15.4% of the population.

<0.1% of residents lived in urban areas, while 100.0% lived in rural areas.

There were 10,320 households in the county, of which 27.5% had children under the age of 18 living in them. Of all households, 52.3% were married-couple households, 19.0% were households with a male householder and no spouse or partner present, and 20.7% were households with a female householder and no spouse or partner present. About 25.7% of all households were made up of individuals and 12.6% had someone living alone who was 65 years of age or older.

There were 15,538 housing units, of which 33.6% were vacant. Among occupied housing units, 81.5% were owner-occupied and 18.5% were renter-occupied. The homeowner vacancy rate was 1.5% and the rental vacancy rate was 6.3%.

=== 2010 census ===
The 2010 United States census indicates Oceana County had a 2010 population of 26,570. This decrease of 303 people from the 2000 United States census represents a 1.1% population decrease in the decade. There were 10,174 households and 7,239 families in the county. The population density was 51.9 per square mile (20.0 square kilometers). There were 15,944 housing units at an average density of 31.1 per square mile (12.0 square kilometers). The racial and ethnic makeup of the county was 83.7% White, 0.4% Black or African American, 0.8% Native American, 0.2% Asian, 13.7% Hispanic or Latino, 0.1% from other races, and 1.2% from two or more races.

Of those households, 30.4% had children under the age of 18 living with them, 56.6% were husband and wife families, 9.5% had a female householder with no husband present, 28.8% were non-families, and 24.6% were made up of individuals. The average household size was 2.58 and the average family size was 3.04.

The county population contained 24.9% under age of 18, 7.5% from 18 to 24, 21.5% from 25 to 44, 29.0% from 45 to 64, and 17.0% who were 65 years of age or older. The median age was 42 years. For every 100 females there were 100.9 males. For every 100 females age 18 and over, there were 99.3 males.

=== 2010 American Community Survey ===
The 2010 American Community Survey 3-year estimate indicates the median income for a household in the county was $39,043 and the median income for a family was $46,816. Males had a median income of $21,774 versus $14,186 for females. The per capita income for the county was $18,065. About 1.9% of families and 19.0% of the population were below the poverty line, including 30.4% of those under the age 18 and 11.3% of those age 65 or over.

=== Religion ===
- Oceana County is part of the Roman Catholic Diocese of Grand Rapids.
- Oceana County is part of the Episcopal Diocese of Western Michigan.
- Several Christian denominations are represented in the county population.
- There is one meetinghouse of the Church of Jesus Christ of Latter-day Saints in Oceana County as of 2018.
- The Seventh-Day Adventist Church has only one church in Oceania County.

== Tourism ==
The Electric Forest Festival (formerly the Rothbury Music Festival) has been held annually in Rothbury, Michigan since 2008, except 2020 and 2021, due to COVID.

Camping is a popular summer activity in Oceana County. Areas on the lakeshore such as Silver Lake, Pentwater, and Stony Lake are popular tourist sites.

== Government ==
Oceana County has largely voted Republican through the years. Since 1884 its voters have selected the Republican Party nominee in 83% (30 of 36) of the national elections through 2024.

United States presidential election results for Oceana County, Michigan
Year	Republican		Democratic		Third party(ies)	
Year	No.	%	No.	%	No.	%
1884	1,637	51.04%	1,213	37.82%	357	11.13%
1888	1,726	47.82%	1,426	39.51%	457	12.66%
1892	1,635	47.38%	1,416	41.03%	400	11.59%
1896	2,534	58.09%	1,637	37.53%	191	4.38%
1900	2,407	63.08%	1,199	31.42%	210	5.50%
1904	2,653	75.65%	591	16.85%	263	7.50%
1908	2,445	68.51%	799	22.39%	325	9.11%
1912	857	23.00%	796	21.36%	2,073	55.64%
1916	1,957	54.27%	1,387	38.46%	262	7.27%
1920	3,535	77.85%	785	17.29%	221	4.87%
1924	3,335	74.94%	650	14.61%	465	10.45%
1928	3,555	79.55%	871	19.49%	43	0.96%
1932	2,481	43.47%	3,051	53.46%	175	3.07%
1936	2,663	45.44%	2,902	49.51%	296	5.05%
1940	3,711	60.57%	2,379	38.83%	37	0.60%
1944	3,534	66.24%	1,738	32.58%	63	1.18%
1948	2,943	60.07%	1,714	34.99%	242	4.94%
1952	4,704	71.04%	1,799	27.17%	119	1.80%
1956	4,479	70.29%	1,868	29.32%	25	0.39%
1960	4,418	62.38%	2,651	37.43%	13	0.18%
1964	2,958	43.87%	3,773	55.95%	12	0.18%
1968	3,911	56.22%	2,152	30.93%	894	12.85%
1972	4,992	64.20%	2,525	32.47%	259	3.33%
1976	5,236	59.51%	3,427	38.95%	135	1.53%
1980	5,465	57.14%	3,386	35.40%	713	7.46%
1984	6,405	68.69%	2,865	30.72%	55	0.59%
1988	5,693	62.46%	3,356	36.82%	65	0.71%
1992	3,944	37.36%	3,846	36.43%	2,767	26.21%
1996	3,947	40.52%	4,419	45.36%	1,376	14.12%
2000	5,913	54.89%	4,597	42.68%	262	2.43%
2004	6,677	54.30%	5,441	44.25%	179	1.46%
2008	5,860	46.85%	6,405	51.20%	244	1.95%
2012	6,239	54.49%	5,063	44.22%	148	1.29%
2016	7,228	60.59%	3,973	33.30%	729	6.11%
2020	8,892	63.15%	4,944	35.11%	244	1.73%
2024	9,547	64.20%	5,085	34.20%	238	1.60%

United States Senate election results for Oceana County, Michigan1
Year	Republican		Democratic		Third party(ies)	
Year	No.	%	No.	%	No.	%
2024	9,168	62.57%	5,066	34.57%	419	2.86%

Michigan Gubernatorial election results for Oceana County
Year	Republican		Democratic		Third party(ies)	
Year	No.	%	No.	%	No.	%
2022	7,012	58.02%	4,820	39.88%	254	2.10%

Oceana County operates the County jail, maintains rural roads, operates the major local courts, records deeds, mortgages, and vital records, administers public health regulations, and participates with the state in the provision of social services. The county board of commissioners controls the budget and has limited authority to make laws or ordinances. In Michigan, most local government functions – police and fire, building and zoning, tax assessment, street maintenance etc. – are the responsibility of individual cities and townships.

=== Elected officials ===
- Prosecuting attorney: Joseph J. Bizon
- Sheriff: Craig Mast
- County administrator: Tracy L Byard
- Animal control: Michael Garcia
- Building inspector: Randy Miller
- County clerk: Melanie A Coon
- Drain commissioner: Michelle Martin
- Economic alliance: Mr. Curtis Burdette
- Emergency management: Troy Maloney
- Equalization: Edward K. VanderVries, MMAO IV, PPE
- Medical examiner: Dr. Rudy Ochs DO
- Register of deeds: Richard A. Hodges
- County treasurer: Mary Lou Phillips

(information as of May 2021)

== Education ==
The West Shore Educational Service District, based in Ludington, services the districts in the county along with those of Mason and Lake counties. The intermediate school district offers regional special education and general education services, as well as technical career programs for its students.

Oceana County is served by the following regular public school districts:

- Hart Public School District
- Pentwater Public School District
- Shelby Public Schools
- Walkerville Public Schools

Oceana County has the following private schools:

- New Era Christian School
- Oceana Christian School (Baptist)

== Communities ==
=== City ===
- Hart (county seat)

=== Villages ===
- Hesperia (partially)
- New Era
- Pentwater
- Rothbury
- Shelby
- Walkerville

=== Census-designated place ===
- Mears

=== Unincorporated communities ===
- Bird
- Collinsville
- Corbin's Mill
- Cranston
- Crystal Valley
- Elbridge
- Elmwood
- Elwood
- Ferry
- Flower Creek
- Forest City
- Gale
- Silver Lake
- Stony Lake

=== Townships ===
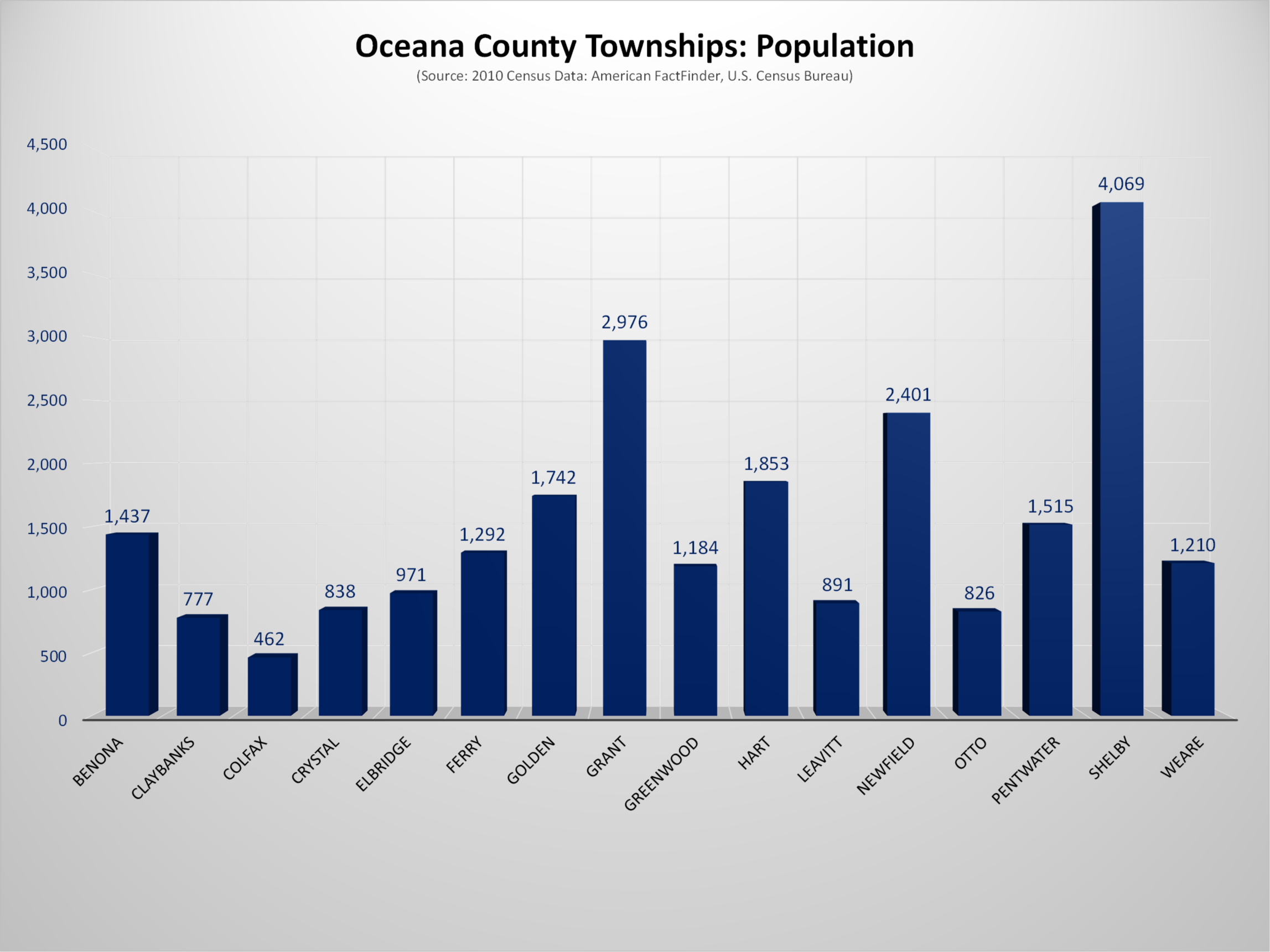
Oceana County, Michigan, Townships Population Chart

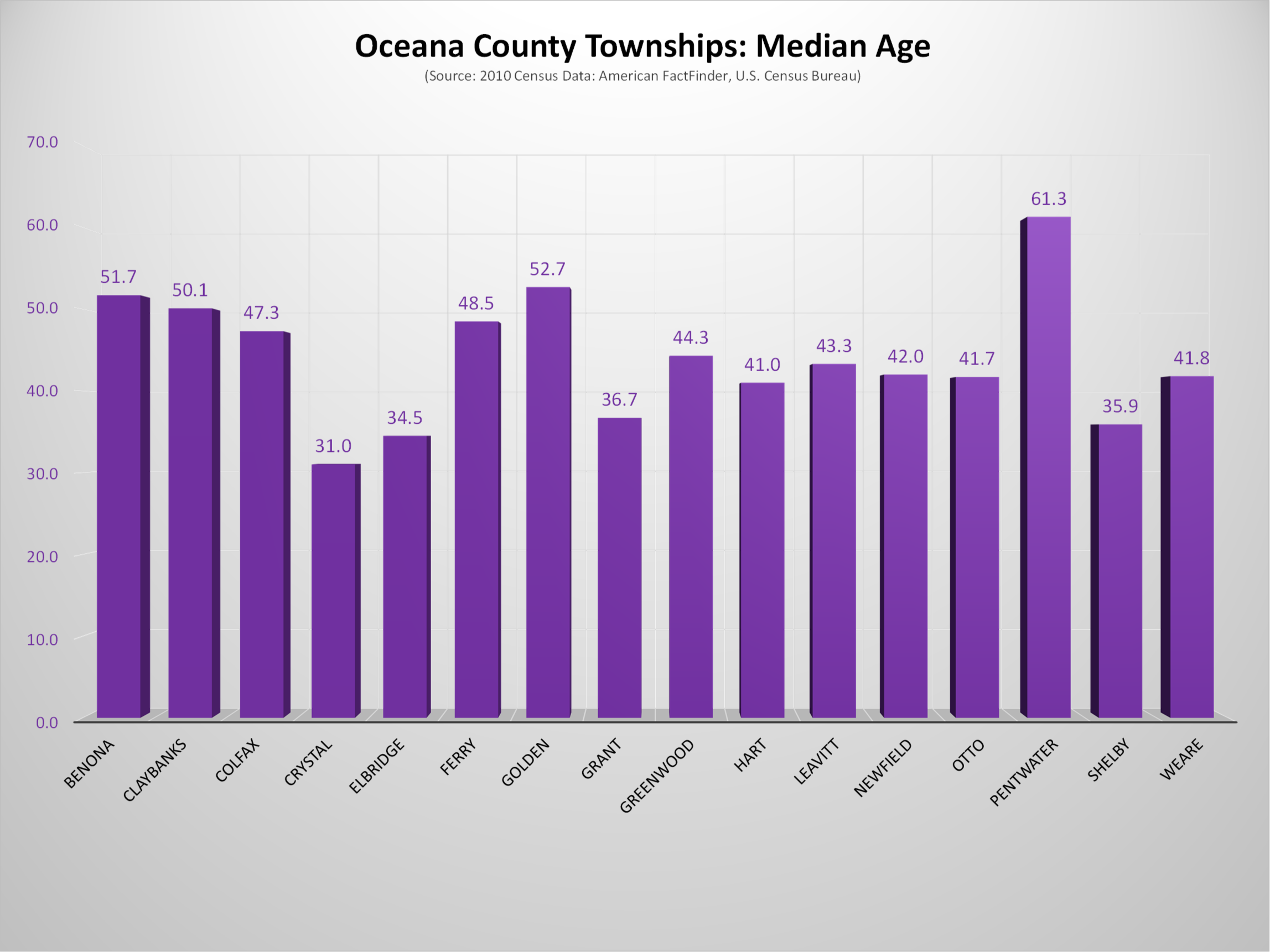
Oceana County, Michigan, Townships - Median Age Chart

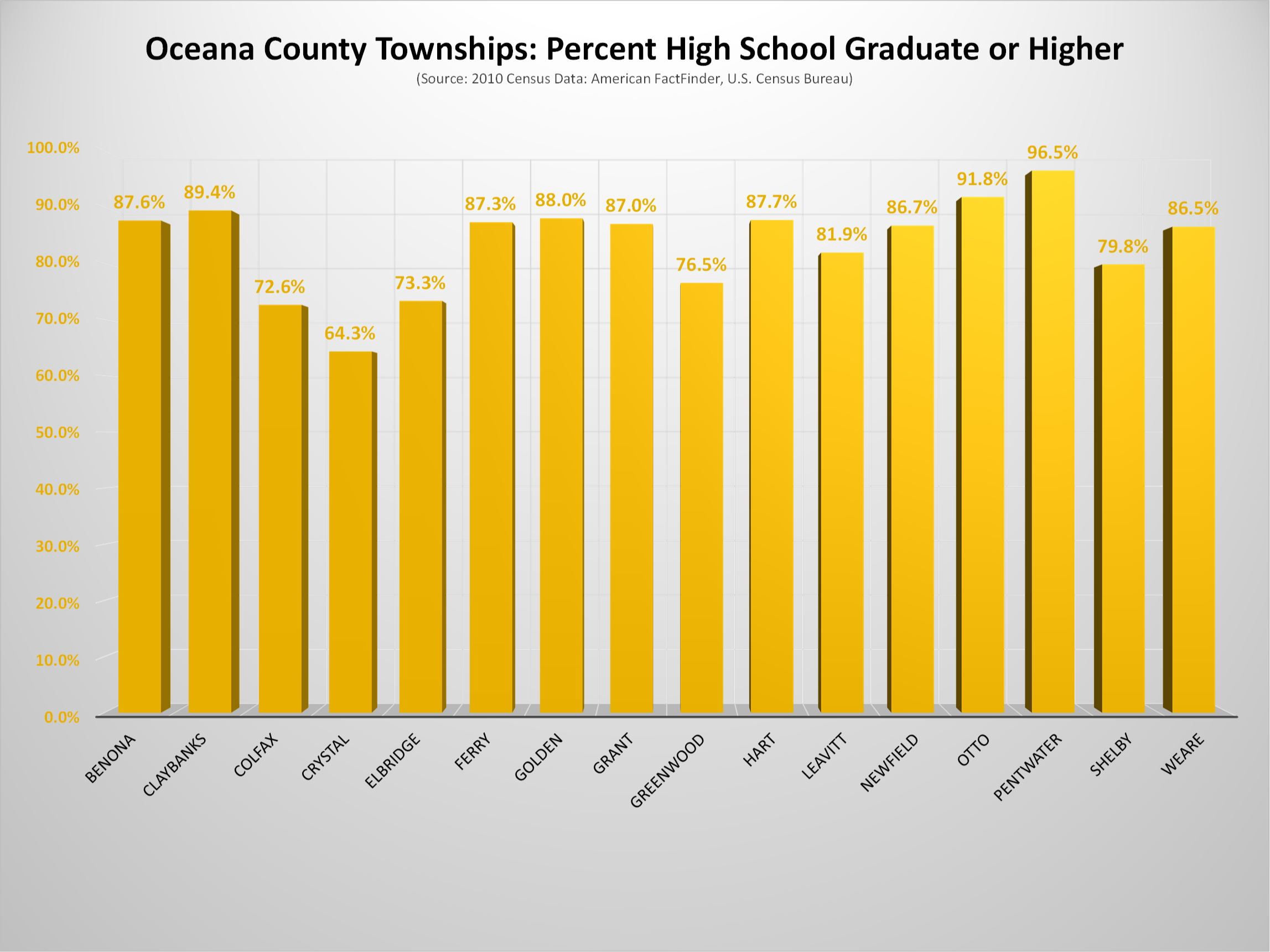
Oceana County, Michigan, Townships - High School Graduates or Higher Chart

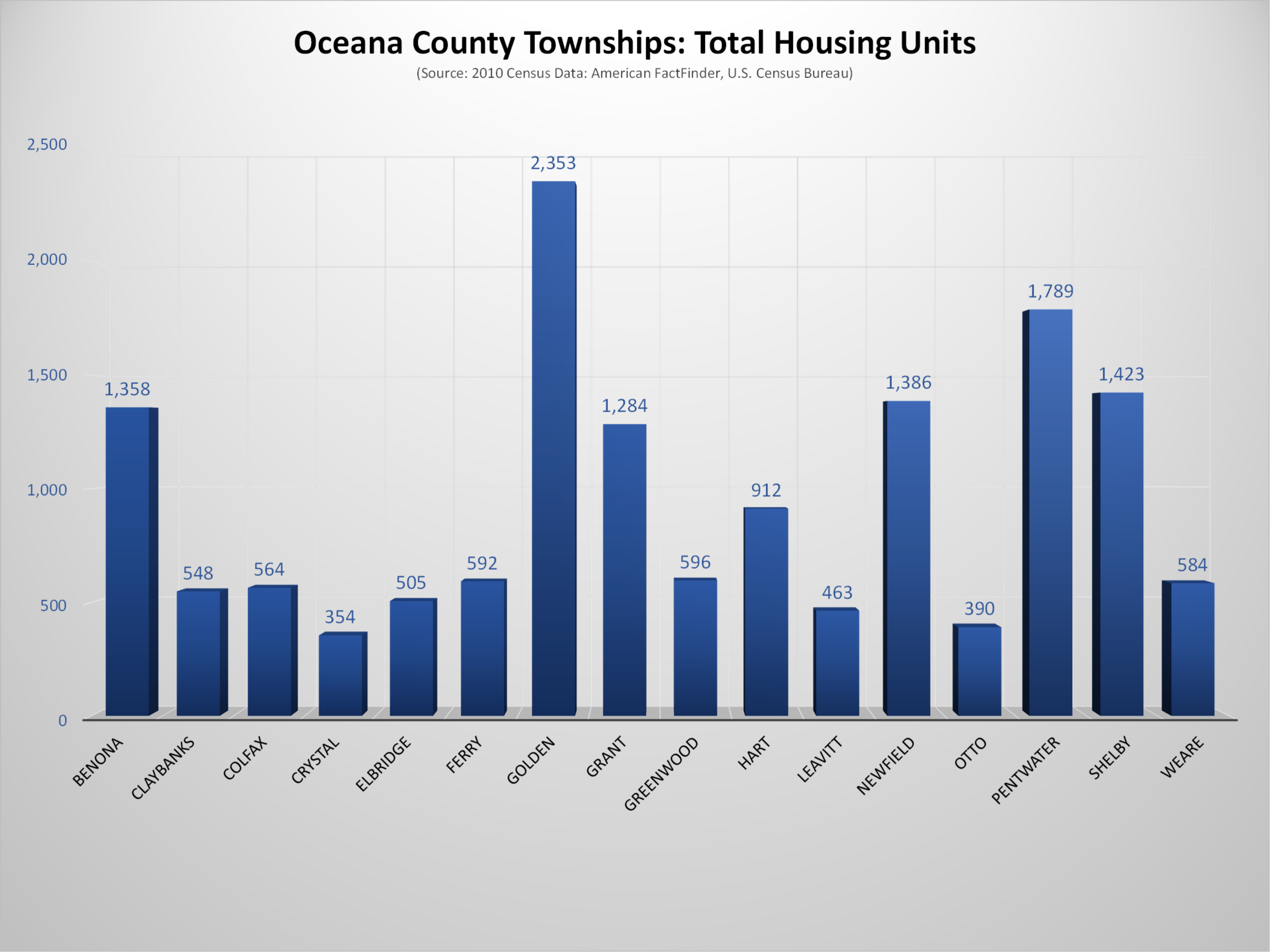
Oceana County, Michigan, Townships - Total Housing Units Chart

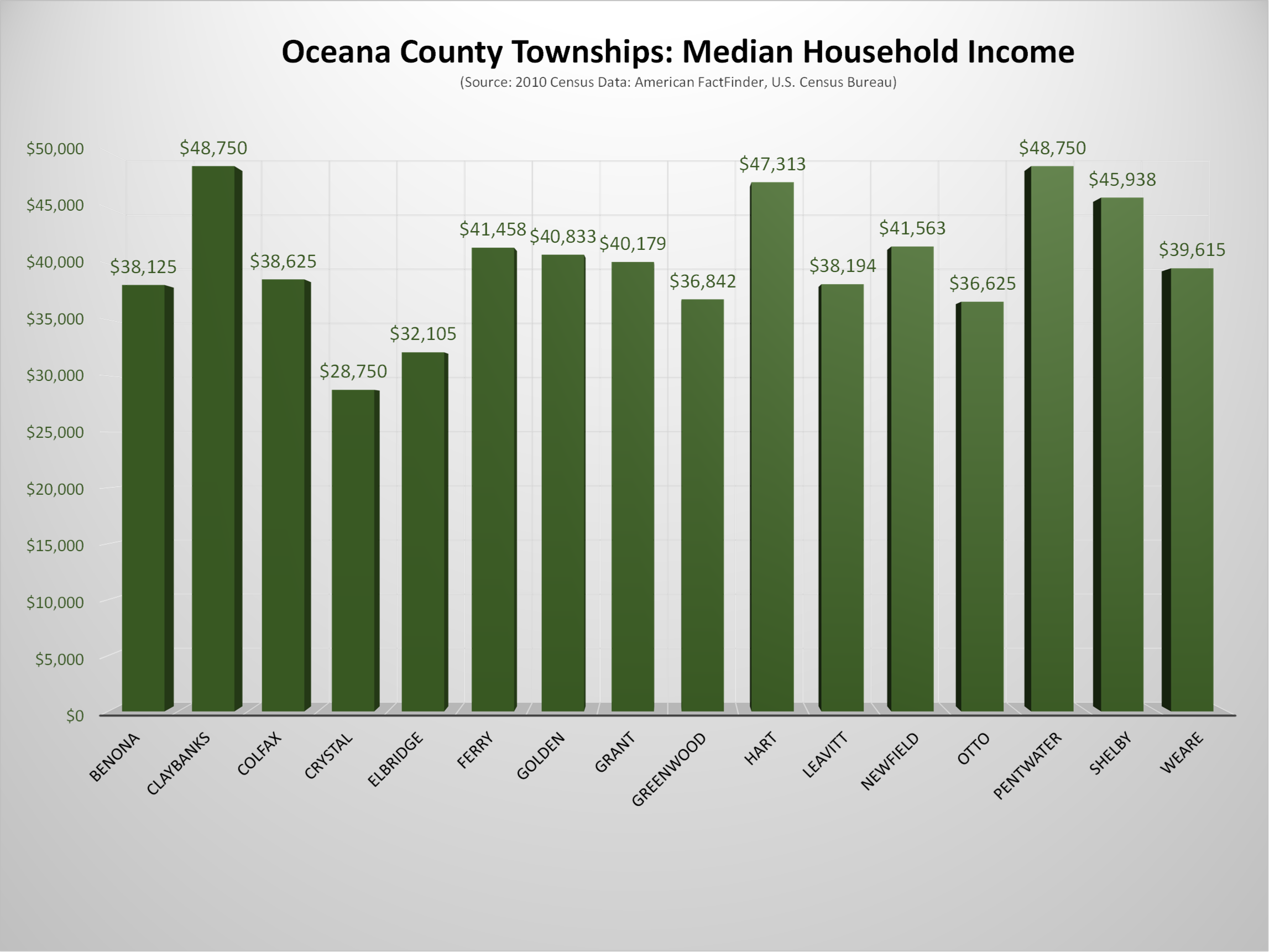
Oceana County, Michigan, Townships - Median House Income Chart

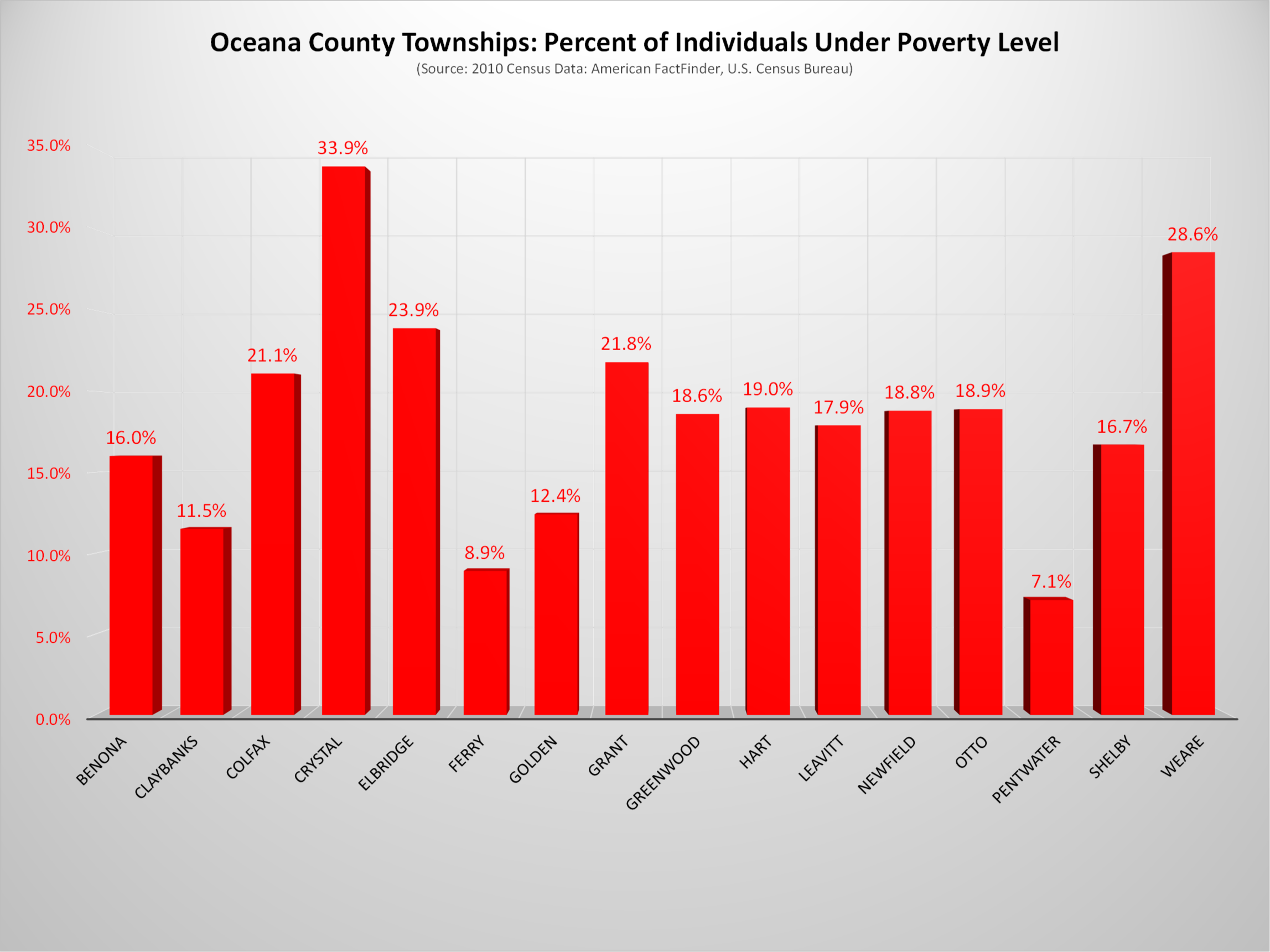
Oceana County Townships - Percent Individuals Under Poverty Level

- Benona Township
- Claybanks Township
- Colfax Township
- Crystal Township
- Elbridge Township
- Ferry Township
- Golden Township
- Grant Township
- Greenwood Township
- Hart Township
- Leavitt Township
- Newfield Township
- Otto Township
- Pentwater Township
- Shelby Township
- Weare Township

== See also ==
- List of Michigan State Historic Sites in Oceana County, Michigan
- National Register of Historic Places listings in Oceana County
