= 2018 United States Senate election in Michigan =

- November 6, 2018
- Turnout: 56.72%
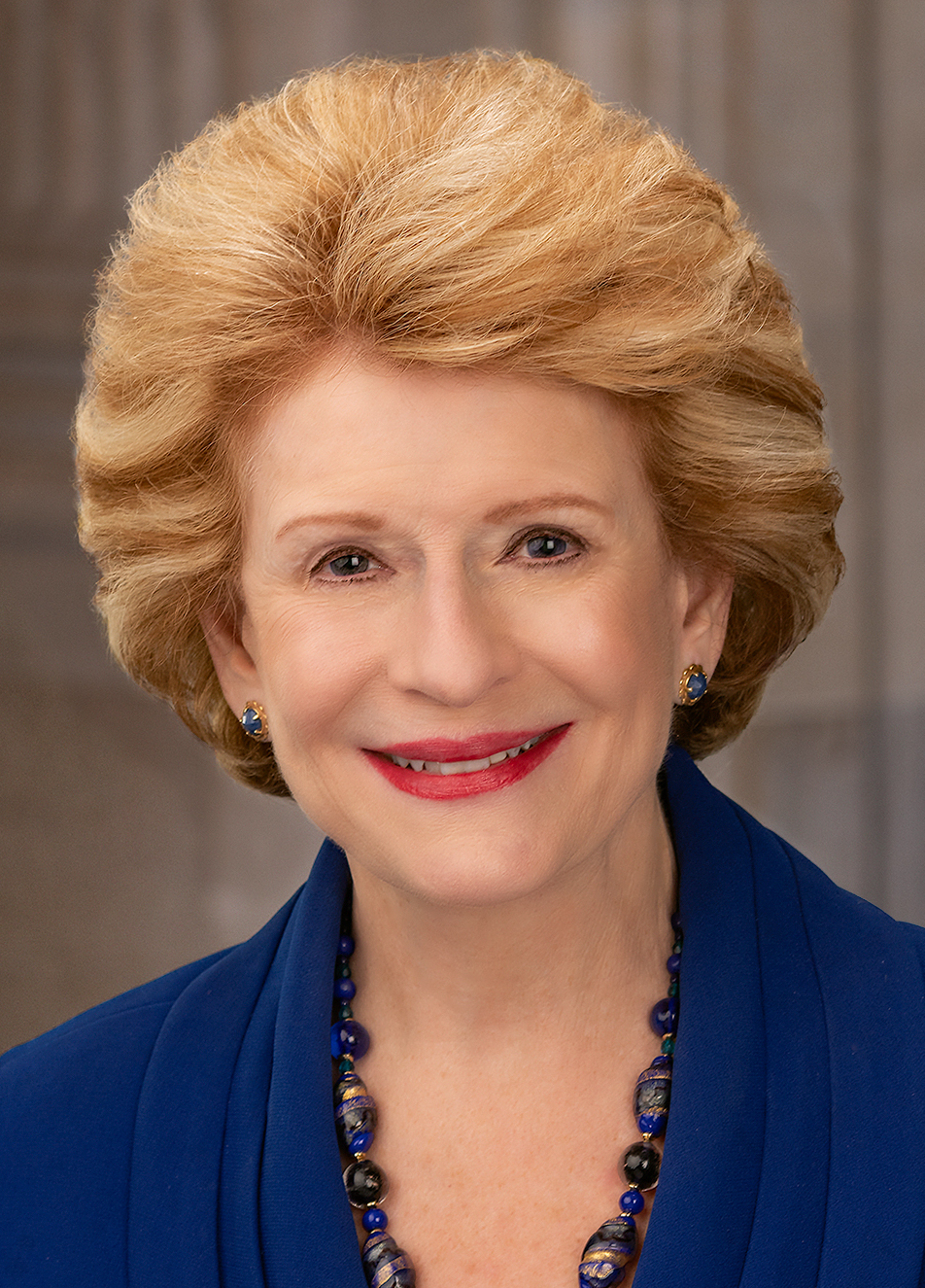

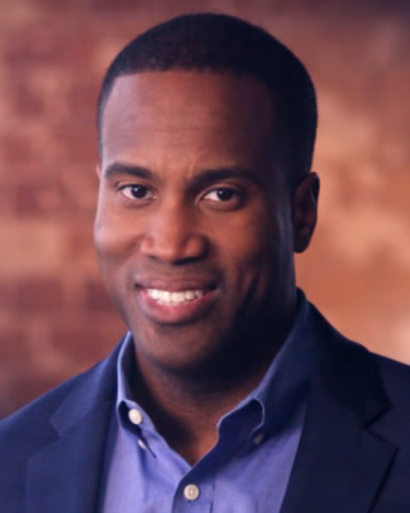
Nominee	Debbie Stabenow	John James
Party	Democratic	Republican
Popular vote	2,214,478	1,938,818
Percentage	52.26%	45.76%
- Stabenow: 40–50% 50–60% 60–70% 70–80% 80–90% >90% James: 40–50% 50–60% 60–70% 70–80% 80–90% Tie: 40–50% No data
U.S. senator before election
Debbie Stabenow
Democratic
Elected U.S. Senator
Debbie Stabenow
Democratic

The 2018 United States Senate election in Michigan took place on November 6, 2018, in order to elect the Class 1 U.S. Senator from the State of Michigan, concurrently with a gubernatorial election, as well as other elections to the U.S. House of Representatives. This was one of ten Democratic-held Senate seats up for election in a state that Donald Trump won in the 2016 presidential election.

Incumbent Democratic U.S. Senator Debbie Stabenow won reelection to a fourth term. On August 7, 2018, John James won the Republican nomination, defeating businessman Sandy Pensler. On May 5, 2018, Marcia Squier received the endorsement and nomination of the Green Party of Michigan at the state convention in Flint.

Stabenow was re-elected by a 6.5% margin and a difference of 275,660 votes, making this the second-closest U.S. Senate election in Michigan since Stabenow was first elected in 2000.

== Democratic primary ==
=== Candidates ===
==== Nominee ====
- Debbie Stabenow, incumbent U.S. Senator

==== Declined ====
- Mike Duggan, Mayor of Detroit

==== Withdrew ====
- Craig Allen Smith

=== Endorsements ===
Debbie Stabenow

Organizations

- EMILY's List
- League of Conservation Voters
- MI List
- National Committee to Preserve Social Security and Medicare
- Natural Resources Defense Council
- Sierra Club

Individuals

- Chelsea Handler, actress and television personality

=== Results ===
Democratic primary results
Party	Candidate	Votes	%
Democratic	Debbie Stabenow (incumbent)	1,045,450	100.00%
Total votes		1,045,450	100.00%

== Republican primary ==
=== Candidates ===
==== Nominee ====
- John James, businessman and Iraq veteran

==== Defeated in primary ====
- Sandy Pensler, former Wayne County Commissioner, businessman and candidate for MI-08 in 1992

==== Failed to qualify ====
- Bob Carr, historic preservationist, businessman and nominee for MI-01 in 1996

==== Declined ====
- John Engler, former governor
- Ted Nugent, musician and political activist (endorsed James)
- Robert Ritchie, better known as musician Kid Rock (endorsed James)
- Bill Schuette, Michigan Attorney General, former U.S. Representative and nominee for U.S. Senate in 1990 (ran for Governor)
- Fred Upton, U.S. Representative

==== Withdrew ====
- Lena Epstein, businesswoman (running for MI-11)
- Robert P. Young Jr., former chief justice of the Michigan Supreme Court (endorsed John James)

=== Endorsements ===
John James

U.S. President

- Donald Trump, 45th President of the United States

U.S. Vice President

- Mike Pence, 48th Vice President of the United States

U.S. Senators

- Marco Rubio, U.S. Senator from Florida

U.S. Representatives

- Jack Bergman, U.S. Representative
- Mike Bishop, U.S. Representative (R-MI 8)
- Bill Huizenga, U.S. Representative
- Paul Mitchell, U.S. Representative
- John Moolenaar, U.S. Representative
- Allen West, former U.S. Representative

U.S. Governors

- Rick Snyder, Governor of Michigan

State Senators

- Judy Emmons
- Joe Hune
- Rick Jones
- John Proos
- Wayne Schmidt
- Mike Shirkey
- Jim Stamas

State Representatives

- Julie Alexander
- Sue Allor
- Tom Barrett
- John Bizon
- Lee Chatfield
- Triston Cole
- Laura Cox
- Gary Glenn
- Joseph Graves
- Beth Griffin
- Roger Hauck
- Michele Hoitenga
- Pamela Hornberger
- Holly Hughes
- Steven Johnson
- Bronna Kahle
- Beau LaFave
- Dan Lauwers
- Eric Leutheuser
- James Lower
- Pete Lucido
- Aaron Miller
- Dave Pagel
- Jason Sheppard
- Jim Tedder
- Curt VanderWall
- Hank Vaupel
- Roger Victory
- Jason Wentworth
- Mary Whiteford

Judges

- Robert P. Young Jr., former Chief Justice of the Michigan Supreme Court

Cabinet-level officials

- John R. Bolton, former United States Ambassador to the United Nations, current National Security Advisor

Individuals

- Dean Cain, actor
- Diamond and Silk, talk show hosts
- Hugh Hewitt, talk show host
- Ted Nugent, musician and political activist
- Robert O'Neill, former U.S. Navy SEAL
- Sandy Pensler, businessman
- Kid Rock, musician
- Donald Trump Jr., businessman and son of U.S. President Donald Trump
- Wayne Wood, former president of the Michigan Farm Bureau

Local officials

- Bob Bezotte, former Sheriff of Livingston County
- Michael Borkovich, Sheriff of Leelanau County
- Tim Donnellon, Sheriff of St. Clair County
- Bob Gatt, Novi Mayor
- Howie Hanft, Sheriff of Ogemaw County
- Mike Murphy, Sheriff of Livingston County
- Mark Northrup, Hudsonville Mayor
- L. Brooks Patterson, Executive of Oakland County
- Michael Taylor, Sterling Heights Mayor

Organizations

- Associated Builders and Contractors of Michigan
- Family Research Council Action PAC
- Grand Rapids Area Chamber of Commerce
- Michigan Chamber of Commerce
- Michigan Cattlemen's Association
- National Right to Life
- Right to Life of Michigan
- Senate Conservatives Fund
- Susan B. Anthony List
- U.S. Chamber of Commerce

Newspapers

- The Detroit News
Sandy Pensler
- Jon Bumstead, state representative
- Rand Paul, U.S. Senator from Kentucky
- Chuck Yob, former Republican National Committeeman
Bob Young Jr. (endorsed James)

Individuals

- John Engler, former Governor
- Ted Nugent, singer/songwriter
- Peter F. Secchia, former Ambassador to Italy

=== Debates ===
A debate was held between John James and Sandy Pensler on July 6 and televised by WKAR-TV. It was the only televised debate scheduled between the two candidates.

=== Polling ===
Poll source	Date(s) administered	Sample size	Margin of error	John James	Sandy Pensler	Other	Undecided
Mitchell Research	July 30, 2018	413	± 5.0%	44%	30%	–	26%
EPIC-MRA	July 21–22, 2018	1,045	± 3.1%	39%	38%	–	23%
Emerson College	July 19–21, 2018	202	± 7.3%	28%	28%	–	44%
Marist College	July 15–19, 2018	337	± 6.3%	30%	23%	1%	46%
National Research Inc. (R-Outsider PAC)	July 11–14, 2018	600	± 4.0%	21%	28%	10%	41%
Target-Insyght	June 24–26, 2018	400	± 5.0%	29%	32%	–	39%
Strategic National (R)	June 16–21, 2018	1,000	± 3.1%	18%	33%	–	49%
Strategic National (R)	June 9–10, 2018	400	± 4.9%	16%	29%	–	54%
Marketing Resource Group (R-Pensler)	May 28–29, 2018	627	± 3.8%	26%	36%	–	38%
Strategic National (R)	April 21, 2018	350	± 5.2%	13%	26%	–	61%
Strategic National (R)	April 4–5, 2018	600	± 4.0%	12%	20%	–	68%
Denno Research	April 2–3, 2018	500	± 4.0%	12%	16%	–	72%
Strategic National (R)	March 19–20, 2018	400	± 4.9%	17%	21%	–	62%

Hypothetical polling

Poll source	Date(s) administered	Sample size	Margin of error	John James	Sandy Pensler	Fred Upton	Robert Young	Undecided
Strategic National (R)	December 16–17, 2017	600	± 4.0%	9%	5%	–	11%	75%
Target-Insyght	November 1–6, 2017	1,000	–	24%	–	19%	7%	–

Poll source	Date(s) administered	Sample size	Margin of error	Lena Epstein	Bob Young	John James	Robert Ritchie	Undecided
Zogby Analytics	September, 2017	– (Note: Not yet released, but is Republican primary subsample of full 800 voter sample in Michigan)	–	7%	3%	5%	29%	56%
Trafalgar Group (R)	July 25–27, 2017	1,078	± 3.1%	9%	6%	7%	50%	28%
Target-Insyght	July 25–27, 2017	344	± 5.35	8%	14%	16%	33%	29%

=== Results ===
Results by county: James: 50–60%; 60–70%; Pensler: 50–60%; 60–70%

Republican primary results
Party	Candidate	Votes	%
Republican	John James	518,564	54.67%
Republican	Sandy Pensler	429,885	45.32%
Write-in		57	<0.01%
Total votes		948,506	100.00%

== Green Party Convention ==
The Green Party of Michigan picked their candidates at a state convention on May 5, 2018.

=== Declared ===
- Marcia Squier, Green nominee for MI-14 in 2016

=== Withdrew ===
- Anita Belle, activist

== General election ==
=== Debates ===
- Complete video of debate, October 14, 2018
- Complete video of debate, October 15, 2018

=== Fundraising ===
Campaign finance reports as of October 17, 2018
Candidate (party)	Total receipts	Total disbursements	Cash on hand
Debbie Stabenow (D)	$17,449,325.17	$15,720,981.25	$2,842,613.58
John James (R)	$9,838,137.84	$7,953,403.16	$1,884,735.02
Source: Federal Election Commission

=== Predictions ===
Source	Ranking	As of
The Cook Political Report	Likely D	October 26, 2018
Inside Elections	Safe D	November 1, 2018
Sabato's Crystal Ball	Safe D	November 5, 2018
CNN	Likely D	November 5, 2018
RealClearPolitics	Lean D	November 5, 2018
Fox News (Note: The Fox News Midterm Power Rankings uniquely does not contain a category for Safe/Solid races)	Likely D	November 5, 2018

=== Endorsements ===
Debbie Stabenow (D)

U.S. Executive Branch officials

- Joe Biden, 47th Vice President of the United States
- Barack Obama, 44th President of the United States

U.S. Senators

- Gary Peters, U.S. Senator from Michigan

U.S. Representatives

- Joe Kennedy III, U.S. Representative
- Dan Kildee, U.S. Representative
- Brenda Lawrence, U.S. Representative

Organizations

- EMILY's List
- Feminist Majority Political Action Committee
- League of Conservation Voters
- MI List
- National Committee to Preserve Social Security and Medicare
- Natural Resources Defense Council
- Population Connection
- Sierra Club
- United Automobile Workers

Individuals

- Chelsea Handler, actress and television personality
John James (R)

U.S. Executive Branch officials

- Mike Pence, Vice President of the United States
- Donald Trump, President of the United States

U.S. Senators

- Marco Rubio, U.S. Senator from Florida

U.S. Representatives

- Jack Bergman, U.S. Representative (MI-1)
- Mike Bishop, U.S. Representative (MI-8)
- Bill Huizenga, U.S. Representative (MI-2)
- Paul Mitchell, U.S. Representative (MI-10)
- John Moolenaar, U.S. Representative (MI-4)
- Allen West, former U.S. Representative (FL-22)

U.S. Governors

- Rick Snyder, Governor of Michigan

State Senators

- Judy Emmons
- Joe Hune
- Rick Jones
- John Proos
- Wayne Schmidt
- Mike Shirkey
- Jim Stamas

State Representatives

- Julie Alexander
- Sue Allor
- Tom Barrett
- John Bizon
- Lee Chatfield
- Triston Cole
- Laura Cox
- Gary Glenn
- Joseph Graves
- Beth Griffin
- Roger Hauck
- Michele Hoitenga
- Pamela Hornberger
- Holly Hughes
- Steven Johnson
- Bronna Kahle
- Beau LaFave
- Dan Lauwers
- Eric Leutheuser
- James Lower
- Pete Lucido
- Aaron Miller
- Dave Pagel
- Jason Sheppard
- Jim Tedder
- Curt VanderWall
- Hank Vaupel
- Roger Victory
- Jason Wentworth
- Mary Whiteford

Judges

- Robert P. Young Jr., former Chief Justice of the Michigan Supreme Court

Cabinet-level officials

- John R. Bolton, former United States Ambassador to the United Nations, current National Security Advisor

Individuals

- Dean Cain, actor
- Diamond and Silk, talk show hosts
- Rudy Giuliani, former Mayor of New York City
- Hugh Hewitt, talk show host
- Mark Levin, lawyer, author, and radio personality
- Ted Nugent, musician and political activist
- Robert O'Neill, former U.S. Navy SEAL
- Sandy Pensler, businessman
- Jordan Peterson, clinical psychologist and professor of psychology at the University of Toronto
- Kid Rock, musician
- Donald Trump Jr., businessman and son of U.S. President Donald Trump
- Wayne Wood, former president of the Michigan Farm Bureau

Local officials

- Bob Bezotte, former Sheriff of Livingston County
- Michael Borkovich, Sheriff of Leelanau County
- Tim Donnellon, Sheriff of St. Clair County
- Bob Gatt, Novi Mayor
- Howie Hanft, Sheriff of Ogemaw County
- Mike Murphy, Sheriff of Livingston County
- Mark Northrup, Hudsonville Mayor
- L. Brooks Patterson, Executive of Oakland County
- Michael Taylor, Sterling Heights Mayor

Organizations

- American Conservative Union
- Associated Builders and Contractors of Michigan
- Family Research Council Action PAC
- Grand Rapids Area Chamber of Commerce
- Michigan Cattlemen's Association
- Michigan Chamber of Commerce
- National Right to Life
- Right to Life of Michigan
- Senate Conservatives Fund
- Susan B. Anthony List
- U.S. Chamber of Commerce

Newspapers

- Daily Press
- The Detroit News
- Iron Mountain Daily News

=== Polling ===
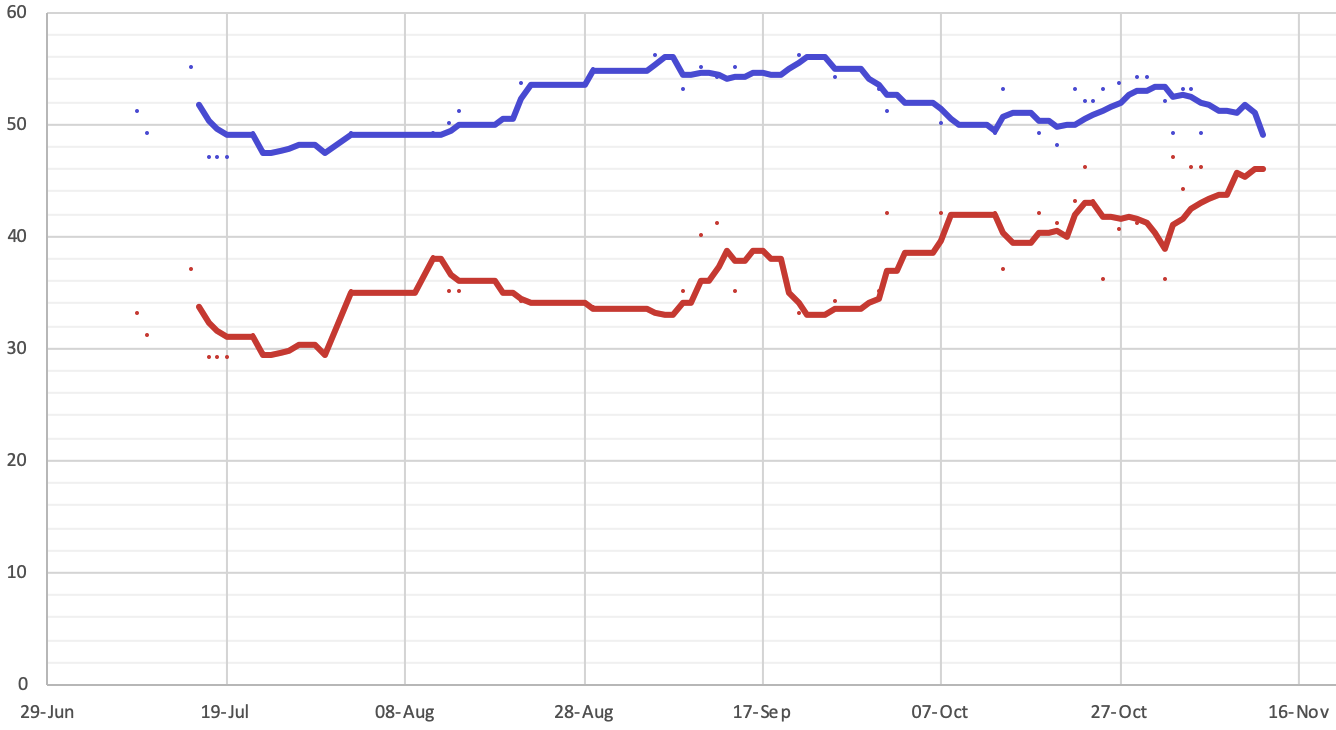

Poll source	Date(s) administered	Sample size	Margin of error	Debbie Stabenow (D)	John James (R)	Other	Undecided
Mitchell Research	November 5, 2018	827	± 3.4%	49%	46%	1%	4%
The Trafalgar Group (R)	November 2–5, 2018	1,817	± 2.3%	53%	44%	1%	2%
Mitchell Research	November 4, 2018	701	± 3.7%	53%	46%	0%	1%
Change Research	November 2–4, 2018	880	–	49%	47%	3%	–
Research Co.	November 1–3, 2018	450	± 4.6%	52%	36%	1%	11%
Gravis Marketing	October 29–30, 2018	764	± 3.6%	54%	41%	–	6%
Glengariff Group	October 25–27, 2018	600	± 4.0%	53%	36%	3%	8%
Emerson College	October 24–26, 2018	822	± 3.6%	52%	43%	1%	4%
Mitchell Research	October 25, 2018	400	± 5.0%	52%	46%	0%	2%
Target-Insyght	October 22–24, 2018	800	± 3.0%	53%	43%	4%	1%
EPIC-MRA	October 18–23, 2018	600	± 4.0%	49%	42%	5%	4%
The Tarrance Group (R) (Note: Poll conducted for James' campaign.)	October 20–22, 2018	605	± 4.1%	48%	41%	4%	7%
Michigan State University	October 13–22, 2018	169	–	49%	42%	–	–
Marketing Resource Group	October 14–18, 2018	600	± 4.0%	53%	37%	–	5%
Mitchell Research	September 30 – October 7, 2018	654	± 3.8%	51%	42%	–	8%
Glengariff Group	September 30 – October 2, 2018	600	± 4.0%	53%	35%	3%	10%
EPIC-MRA	September 21–25, 2018	600	± 4.0%	56%	33%	5%	6%
Ipsos	September 14–24, 2018	1,150	± 3.0%	55%	35%	4%	6%
Target-Insyght	September 10–14, 2018	800	± 3.0%	55%	40%	–	–
Mitchell Research	September 12–13, 2018	1,009	± 3.0%	54%	41%	–	5%
Strategic National (R)	September 8–9, 2018	1,000	± 3.1%	53%	35%	–	11%
Glengariff Group	September 5–7, 2018	600	± 4.0%	56%	33%	2%	10%
Gravis Marketing	August 14–16, 2018	647	± 3.9%	51%	35%	–	14%
Strategic National (R)	August 13–14, 2018	700	± 3.7%	50%	35%	2%	13%
The Tarrance Group (R)	August 11–14, 2018	602	± 4.1%	49%	38%	3%	9%
Emerson College	July 19–21, 2018	600	± 4.3%	47%	29%	8%	17%
Marist College	July 15–19, 2018	886	± 3.9%	55%	37%	1%	8%
SurveyMonkey/Axios	June 11 – July 2, 2018	978	± 5.0%	54%	42%	–	4%
Glengariff Group	January 16–19, 2018	600	± 4.0%	51%	30%	–	18%

Hypothetical polling

with Sandy Pensler

Poll source	Date(s) administered	Sample size	Margin of error	Debbie Stabenow (D)	Sandy Pensler (R)	Other	Undecided
Emerson College	July 19–21, 2018	600	± 4.3%	48%	32%	7%	13%
Marist College	July 15–19, 2018	886	± 3.9%	52%	37%	1%	10%
SurveyMonkey/Axios	June 11 – July 2, 2018	978	± 5.0%	53%	41%	–	5%
Glengariff Group	January 16–19, 2018	600	± 4.0%	51%	30%	–	18%

with generic Democrat and Republican

Poll source	Date(s) administered	Sample size	Margin of error	Debbie Stabenow (D)	Generic Republican	Undecided
SurveyMonkey/Axios	February 12 – March 5, 2018	2,012	± 3.8%	49%	45%	6%

with Robert Ritchie (a.k.a. Kid Rock)

Poll source	Date(s) administered	Sample size	Margin of error	Debbie Stabenow (D)	Robert Ritchie (R)	Undecided
Mitchell/Rosetta Stone	October 1, 2017	558	± 4.2%	46%	38%	16%
Zogby Analytics	September 19, 2017	800	± 3.4%	46%	36%	18%
Marketing Resource Group	September 13–18, 2017	600	± 4.0%	52%	34%	14%
Target-Insyght	July 25–27, 2017	822	± 3.5%	50%	42%	8%
Trafalgar Group (R)	July 25–27, 2017	1,078	± 3.1%	46%	49%	5%

=== Results ===
2018 United States Senate election in Michigan
Party	Candidate	Votes	%	±%
Democratic	Debbie Stabenow (incumbent)	2,214,478	52.26%	−6.54%
Republican	John James	1,938,818	45.76%	+7.78%
Green	Marcia Squier	40,204	0.95%	+0.35%
U.S. Taxpayers'	George Huffman III	27,251	0.65%	+0.09%
Natural Law	John Howard Wilhelm	16,502	0.39%	+0.15%
Write-in		18	<0.01%	N/A
Total votes		4,237,271	100.00%	N/A
Democratic hold				

==== By county ====
County	Debbie Stabenow Democratic		John James Republican		Various candidates Other parties		Margin		Total
County	#	%	#	%	#	%	#	%	Total
Alcona	1,915	34.47%	3,541	63.74%	99	1.78%	-1,626	-29.27%	5,555
Alger	1,911	45.92%	2,162	51.95%	89	2.14%	-251	-6.03%	4,162
Allegan	18,890	37.96%	29,834	59.95%	1,038	2.09%	-10,944	-21.99%	49,762
Alpena	5,412	41.37%	7,380	56.41%	290	2.22%	-1,968	-15.04%	13,082
Antrim	4,953	38.50%	7,629	59.30%	284	2.21%	-2,676	-20.80%	12,866
Arenac	2,582	38.34%	3,995	59.32%	158	2.35%	-1,413	-20.98%	6,735
Baraga	1,344	41.35%	1,825	56.15%	81	2.49%	-481	-14.80%	3,250
Barry	9,857	36.87%	16,260	60.81%	620	2.32%	-6,403	-23.95%	26,737
Bay	22,502	48.57%	22,752	49.11%	1,079	2.33%	-250	-0.54%	46,333
Benzie	4,484	45.88%	5,080	51.98%	209	2.14%	-596	-6.10%	9,773
Berrien	27,345	44.12%	33,229	53.61%	1,411	2.28%	-5,884	-9.49%	61,985
Branch	5,144	33.84%	9,666	63.60%	389	2.56%	-4,522	-29.75%	15,199
Calhoun	22,739	45.44%	25,950	51.85%	1,356	2.71%	-3,211	-6.42%	50,045
Cass	7,079	36.41%	11,811	60.74%	555	2.85%	-4,732	-24.34%	19,445
Charlevoix	5,596	40.96%	7,783	56.97%	283	2.07%	-2,187	-16.01%	13,662
Cheboygan	4,825	38.54%	7,384	58.97%	312	2.49%	-2,559	-20.44%	12,521
Chippewa	5,901	42.22%	7,767	55.57%	310	2.22%	-1,866	-13.35%	13,978
Clare	4,513	38.08%	7,048	59.47%	290	2.45%	-2,535	-21.39%	11,851
Clinton	17,564	47.38%	18,946	51.10%	564	1.52%	-1,382	-3.73%	37,074
Crawford	2,306	36.88%	3,751	59.99%	196	3.13%	-1,445	-23.11%	6,253
Delta	6,932	42.23%	9,197	56.02%	287	1.75%	-2,265	-13.80%	16,416
Dickinson	4,162	36.63%	6,982	61.45%	219	1.93%	-2,820	-24.82%	11,363
Eaton	26,147	51.32%	23,771	46.65%	1,034	2.03%	2,376	4.66%	50,952
Emmet	7,620	42.59%	9,875	55.20%	396	2.21%	-2,255	-12.60%	17,891
Genesee	95,903	56.99%	68,648	40.79%	3,727	2.21%	27,255	16.20%	168,278
Gladwin	4,160	37.80%	6,604	60.01%	241	2.19%	-2,444	-22.21%	11,005
Gogebic	3,311	50.73%	3,078	47.16%	138	2.11%	233	3.57%	6,527
Grand Traverse	22,757	46.70%	24,903	51.11%	1,068	2.19%	-2,146	-4.40%	48,728
Gratiot	5,764	40.31%	8,180	57.21%	355	2.48%	-2,416	-16.90%	14,299
Hillsdale	5,079	30.23%	11,310	67.32%	411	2.45%	-6,231	-37.09%	16,800
Houghton	6,533	45.62%	7,503	52.39%	285	1.99%	-970	-6.77%	14,321
Huron	5,087	37.20%	8,312	60.79%	274	2.00%	-3,225	-23.59%	13,673
Ingham	78,012	65.47%	38,870	32.62%	2,279	1.91%	39,142	32.85%	119,161
Ionia	9,259	39.02%	13,834	58.30%	637	2.68%	-4,575	-19.28%	23,730
Iosco	4,752	40.62%	6,694	57.22%	253	2.16%	-1,942	-16.60%	11,699
Iron	2,259	41.76%	3,000	55.45%	151	2.79%	-741	-13.70%	5,410
Isabella	11,304	50.42%	10,536	47.00%	578	2.58%	768	3.43%	22,418
Jackson	25,858	42.54%	33,490	55.10%	1,434	2.36%	-7,632	-12.56%	60,782
Kalamazoo	65,686	57.29%	46,243	40.33%	2,719	2.37%	19,443	16.96%	114,648
Kalkaska	2,737	32.87%	5,340	64.12%	251	3.01%	-2,603	-31.26%	8,328
Kent	137,089	49.05%	136,227	48.74%	6,158	2.20%	862	0.31%	279,474
Keweenaw	598	45.20%	704	53.21%	21	1.59%	-106	-8.01%	1,323
Lake	1,936	41.12%	2,633	55.93%	139	2.95%	-697	-14.80%	4,708
Lapeer	14,396	36.52%	24,206	61.41%	818	2.08%	-9,810	-24.89%	39,420
Leelanau	7,216	50.85%	6,775	47.74%	201	1.42%	441	3.11%	14,192
Lenawee	17,084	42.75%	21,981	55.01%	895	2.24%	-4,897	-12.25%	39,960
Livingston	37,450	38.62%	58,020	59.83%	1,510	1.56%	-20,570	-21.21%	96,980
Luce	811	33.76%	1,524	63.45%	67	2.79%	-713	-29.68%	2,402
Mackinac	2,325	40.70%	3,298	57.73%	90	1.58%	-973	-17.03%	5,713
Macomb	179,975	50.07%	173,369	48.23%	6,121	1.70%	6,606	1.84%	359,465
Manistee	5,242	44.76%	6,183	52.79%	287	2.45%	-941	-8.03%	11,712
Marquette	16,977	56.62%	12,348	41.18%	660	2.20%	4,629	15.44%	29,985
Mason	5,708	41.73%	7,625	55.75%	344	2.52%	-1,917	-14.02%	13,677
Mecosta	6,317	40.51%	8,857	56.80%	420	2.69%	-2,540	-16.29%	15,594
Menominee	3,653	41.47%	4,982	56.56%	174	1.98%	-1,329	-15.09%	8,809
Midland	15,959	41.62%	21,696	56.58%	689	1.80%	-5,737	-14.96%	38,344
Missaukee	1,783	27.20%	4,650	70.94%	122	1.86%	-2,867	-43.74%	6,555
Monroe	26,651	43.39%	33,607	54.71%	1,165	1.90%	-6,956	-11.32%	61,423
Montcalm	8,758	37.56%	13,878	59.52%	681	2.92%	-5,120	-21.96%	23,317
Montmorency	1,537	33.34%	2,978	64.60%	95	2.06%	-1,441	-31.26%	4,610
Muskegon	35,957	52.29%	30,831	44.84%	1,977	2.88%	5,126	7.45%	68,765
Newaygo	6,858	33.85%	12,870	63.53%	531	2.62%	-6,012	-29.68%	20,259
Oakland	338,986	56.14%	256,017	42.40%	8,812	1.46%	82,969	13.74%	603,815
Oceana	4,213	39.17%	6,263	58.22%	281	2.61%	-2,050	-19.06%	10,757
Ogemaw	3,280	36.01%	5,592	61.39%	237	2.60%	-2,312	-25.38%	9,109
Ontonagon	1,313	41.96%	1,752	55.99%	64	2.05%	-439	-14.03%	3,129
Osceola	2,934	31.24%	6,186	65.86%	272	2.90%	-3,252	-34.63%	9,392
Oscoda	1,221	32.85%	2,410	64.84%	86	2.31%	-1,189	-31.99%	3,717
Otsego	3,969	35.02%	7,092	62.57%	273	2.41%	-3,123	-27.55%	11,334
Ottawa	45,696	35.64%	80,318	62.65%	2,184	1.70%	-34,622	-27.01%	128,198
Presque Isle	2,760	41.28%	3,788	56.66%	138	2.06%	-1,028	-15.38%	6,686
Roscommon	4,643	39.32%	6,864	58.14%	300	2.54%	-2,221	-18.81%	11,807
Saginaw	41,472	51.32%	37,809	46.79%	1,533	1.90%	3,663	4.53%	80,814
Sanilac	5,418	32.95%	10,657	64.81%	368	2.24%	-5,239	-31.86%	16,443
Schoolcraft	1,547	41.40%	2,099	56.17%	91	2.44%	-552	-14.77%	3,737
Shiawassee	13,043	43.89%	15,865	53.38%	812	2.73%	-2,822	-9.50%	29,720
St. Clair	27,540	40.80%	38,329	56.78%	1,636	2.42%	-10,789	-15.98%	67,505
St. Joseph	7,278	35.67%	12,489	61.21%	636	3.12%	-5,211	-25.54%	20,403
Tuscola	8,197	36.82%	13,495	60.62%	568	2.55%	-5,298	-23.80%	22,260
Van Buren	13,191	44.80%	15,379	52.23%	873	2.97%	-2,188	-7.43%	29,443
Washtenaw	123,305	71.18%	47,380	27.35%	2,541	1.47%	75,925	43.83%	173,226
Wayne	455,176	69.13%	190,884	28.99%	12,331	1.87%	264,292	40.14%	658,391
Wexford	4,832	34.56%	8,745	62.54%	406	2.90%	-3,913	-27.98%	13,983
Totals	2,214,478	52.26%	1,938,818	45.76%	83,975 (Note: The county results exclude write-ins; 18 of these votes were recorded statewide.)	1.98%	275,660	6.51%	4,237,271

Counties that flipped from Democratic to Republican

- Alcona (largest city: Harrisville)
- Alger (largest city: Munising)
- Alpena (largest city: Alpena)
- Arenac (largest city: Standish)
- Baraga (largest city: Baraga)
- Bay (largest city: Bay City)
- Benzie (largest city: Frankfort)
- Calhoun (largest city: Battle Creek)
- Cheboygan (largest city: Cheboygan)
- Chippewa (largest city: Sault Ste. Marie)
- Clare (largest city: Clare)
- Clinton (largest city: St. Johns)
- Crawford (largest city: Grayling)
- Delta (largest city: Escanaba)
- Dickinson (largest city: Iron Mountain)
- Gladwin (largest city: Gladwin)
- Gratiot (largest city: Alma)
- Houghton (largest city: Houghton)
- Huron (largest city: Bad Axe)
- Ionia (largest city: Ionia)
- Iosco (largest city: East Tawas)
- Iron (largest city: Iron River)
- Jackson (largest city: Jackson)
- Keweenaw (largest city: Ahmeek)
- Lake (largest city: Baldwin)
- Lapeer (largest city: Lapeer)
- Lenawee (largest city: Adrian)
- Luce (largest city: Newberry)
- Mackinac (largest city: St. Ignace)
- Manistee (largest city: Manistee)
- Mason (largest city: Ludington)
- Mecosta (largest city: Big Rapids)
- Menominee (largest city: Menominee)
- Monroe (largest city: Monroe)
- Montcalm (largest city: Greenville)
- Montmorency (largest city: Lewiston)
- Ogemaw (largest city: West Branch)
- Ontonagon (largest city: Ontonagon)
- Oscoda (largest city: Mio)
- Presque Isle (largest city: Rogers City)
- Roscommon (largest city: Houghton Lake)
- Sanilac (largest city: Sandusky)
- Schoolcraft (largest city: Manistique)
- Shiawassee (largest city: Owosso)
- St. Clair (largest city: Port Huron)
- Tuscola (largest city: Caro)
- Van Buren (largest city: South Haven)
- Wexford (largest city: Cadillac)

Counties that flipped from Republican to Democratic

- Kent (largest city: Grand Rapids)

==== By congressional district ====
Stabenow and James each won seven of 14 congressional districts.

District	Stabenow	James	Representative
1st	43%	54%	Jack Bergman
2nd	43%	55%	Bill Huizenga
3rd	47%	51%	Justin Amash
4th	41%	57%	John Moolenaar
5th	55%	43%	Dan Kildee
6th	47%	50%	Fred Upton
7th	45%	53%	Tim Walberg
8th	49.4%	49.0%	Elissa Slotkin
9th	58%	40%	Andy Levin
10th	40%	58%	Paul Mitchell
11th	51%	48%	Haley Stevens
12th	66%	32%	Debbie Dingell
13th	80%	18%	Rashida Tlaib
14th	79%	20%	Brenda Lawrence

== Analysis ==
Although Stabenow ended up winning the election by 6.5 percent, the margin was smaller than expected, considering the polling and past results of Senate elections in Michigan. Part of the relative closeness of the race has been attributed to the Stabenow campaign having run no negative ads against James during the election. Although James won most of Michigan's smaller counties, Stabenow won large margins in urban areas and modest margins in suburban areas. Stabenow trounced James in Wayne County, home of Detroit, and also performed well in Detroit's suburbs. She also easily won in Washtenaw County, home of Ann Arbor and Ingham County, home of Lansing. Kent County, home of Grand Rapids, also narrowly flipped to Stabenow, making this the first Senate election of her career in which she carried the county, and also the only county to flip her direction in 2018, and only the second time (after Carl Levin in 2008) a Democrat had carried the county since Donald Riegle in 1982. In addition to Stabenow's win, Democrats won the previously Republican-held offices of governor, secretary of state, and attorney general, ensuring that as of January 1, 2019, all elected statewide officials would be Democrats. James ran unsuccessfully for the other Senate seat in 2020, losing to incumbent Gary Peters, and would later be elected as a representative in Michigan's 10th congressional district in 2022 and 2024.

== Notes ==
Partisan clients
