= 2018 Michigan gubernatorial election =

- November 6, 2018
- Turnout: 55.4% ▲13.8
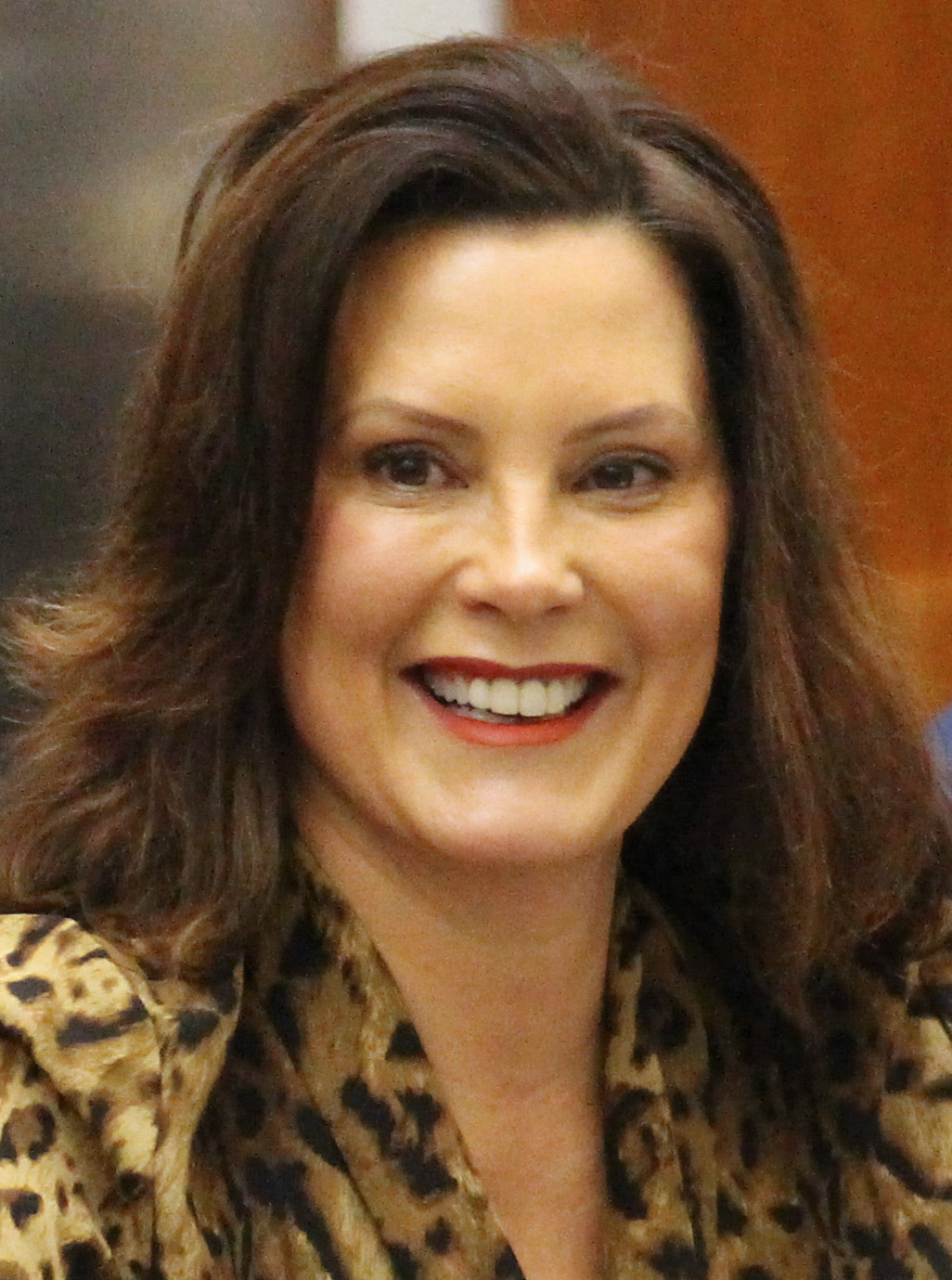

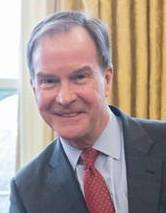
Nominee	Gretchen Whitmer	Bill Schuette
Party	Democratic	Republican
Running mate	Garlin Gilchrist	Lisa Posthumus Lyons
Popular vote	2,266,193	1,859,534
Percentage	53.31%	43.75%
- Whitmer: 40–50% 50–60% 60–70% 70–80% 80–90% >90% Schuette: 40–50% 50–60% 60–70% 70–80% 80–90% >90% Tie: 40–50% No data
Governor before election
Rick Snyder
Republican
Elected Governor
Gretchen Whitmer
Democratic

The 2018 Michigan gubernatorial election took place on November 6, 2018, to elect the next governor of Michigan, concurrently with the election of Michigan's Class I U.S. Senate seat, as well as other elections to the United States Senate in other states, elections to the United States House of Representatives, and various state and local elections.

Incumbent Republican Governor Rick Snyder and Lieutenant Governor Brian Calley were term-limited and were unable to seek a third term in office. The filing deadline was April 24, 2018. The Republican, Democratic and Libertarian parties chose their nominees in a partisan primary on August 7, 2018. 2018 was the first year the Libertarian Party held a gubernatorial primary alongside the two other major parties in the state of Michigan. The Working Class Party, U.S. Taxpayers Party, Green Party and Natural Law Party chose their nominees at state party conventions.

The race was not as close as expected, with Democrat Gretchen Whitmer being elected with 53.3% of the vote to Republican Bill Schuette's 43.8%. Schuette performed best in more sparsely populated areas, while Whitmer was supported by large margins in large and medium cities, such as Detroit, Ann Arbor, and Lansing. Whitmer also performed well in the Detroit suburbs. Whitmer carried former Republican stronghold Kent County (location of her hometown Grand Rapids), the first Democratic candidate to do so since James Blanchard's landslide 1986 reelection. Democrats swept the statewide races by also holding onto the Senate seat that was up for re-election, and picking up the positions of secretary of state and attorney general. They also captured every state university trustee seat that was up for election as well as the State Board of Education.

== Republican primary ==
=== Candidates ===
==== Nominated ====
- Bill Schuette, attorney general of Michigan

==== Eliminated in primary ====
- Brian Calley, lieutenant governor
- Patrick Colbeck, state senator
- Jim Hines, physician and president of the Christian Medical and Dental Associations

==== Declined ====
- David Agema, former Republican National Committeeman and former state representative (endorsed Colbeck)
- Jase Bolger, former speaker of the Michigan House of Representatives
- Larry C. Inman, state representative
- Ruth Johnson, Michigan secretary of state and nominee for lieutenant governor in 2006 (running for state senate)
- Arlan Meekhof, majority leader of the Michigan Senate
- Candice Miller, Macomb County public works commissioner and former U.S. representative (endorsed Schuette)

=== Endorsements ===
Bill Schuette

U.S. executive branch officials

- Mike Pence, 47th vice president of the United States (2017–2021), former governor of Indiana (2013–2017) and former U.S. representative (IN-6/IN-2) (2001–2013)
- Donald Trump, 45th president of the United States (2017–2021)

U.S. governors

- Scott Walker, governor of Wisconsin

U.S. representatives

- Tim Walberg, U.S. representative (MI-07)

Local politicians

- Mike Bouchard, Oakland County sheriff
- L. Brooks Patterson, Oakland County executive

Individuals

- Ted Nugent, guitarist, singer, songwriter, and political activist
Jim Hines

Organizations

- Right to Life of Michigan
Patrick Colbeck

U.S. senators

- Ted Cruz, U.S. senator from Texas (2013–present)

State officials

- David Agema, former Republican National Committeeman and former state representative

Individuals

- David Barton, founder of Wallbuilders
- Dawn Dodge, Speakers Bureau director for the Republican Women's Federation of Michigan
- Bob Dutko, Conservative Christian talk radio host
- Mark Gurley, co-director of the Michigan Oak Initiative, Grassroots vice-chair for the MIGOP
- Sean Hannity
- Jack Lousma, former NASA astronaut and retired USMC colonel
- Bob Lutz, former General Motors vice chairman and ex-Chrysler president
- Wes Nakagiri, Michigan Tea Party leader, one of the 17 Republican at-large delegates sent to the 2016 Republican National Convention
- Thayrone X, Metro Detroit talk radio host

Organizations

- Michigan Vaccine Freedom PAC
- Right to Life of Michigan
Brian Calley

U.S. governors

- Rick Snyder, governor of Michigan

U.S. representatives

- Justin Amash, U.S. representative (MI-03)

State and local officials

- Bryan Barnett, mayor of Rochester Hills
- Chris Barnett, supervisor of Orion Township
- Robert Cannon, supervisor of Clinton Township
- Donijo DeJonge, Kent County GOP chair
- Judy Emmons, state senator
- Kurt Heise, supervisor of Plymouth Township
- Patrick Kittle, supervisor of Independence Township
- Terri Lynn Land, former Michigan secretary of state
- James Lower, state representative
- Ken Massey, mayor of Farmington Hills
- Kevin McDaniel, mayor of Auburn Hills
- Steve Percival, mayor of Clarkston
- Leo Savoie, supervisor of Bloomfield Township
- Dane Slater, mayor of Troy
- Gary Wall, supervisor of Waterford Township
- Michael Webber, state representative

Individuals

- Dan DeVos, businessman and sports executive
- Chuck Yob, former Republican National Committee member

Organizations

- Detroit Regional Chamber of Commerce
- Grand Rapids Area Chamber of Commerce
- Home Builders Association of Michigan
- Michigan Vaccine Freedom PAC
- Right to Life of Michigan

Newspapers

- Detroit Free Press
- The Detroit News

=== Debates ===
Host network	Date	Link(s)	Participants			
Host network	Date	Link(s)	Bill Schuette	Patrick Colbeck	Brian Calley	Jim Hines
WOOD-TV	May 9, 2018		Invited	Invited	Invited	Invited
WDIV-TV	June 28, 2018		Invited	Invited	Invited	Invited

=== Polling ===
Poll source	Date(s) administered	Sample size	Margin of error	Brian Calley	Patrick Colbeck	Jim Hines	Bill Schuette	Other	Undecided
Mitchell Research	July 30, 2018	413	± 5.0%	18%	9%	10%	40%	–	23%
EPIC-MRA	July 21–22, 2018	1,045	± 3.1%	24%	11%	8%	42%	–	15%
Emerson College	July 19–21, 2018	202	± 7.3%	13%	7%	9%	35%	–	36%
Marist College	July 15–19, 2018	337	± 6.3%	26%	11%	–	33%	1%	30%
JMC Analytics	July 5–12, 2018	600	± 4.0%	17%	10%	4%	25%	–	45%
Target-Insyght	June 24–26, 2018	400	± 5.0%	16%	8%	4%	45%	–	21%
NMB Research (R-Better Jobs PAC)	June 18–21, 2018	–	–	23%	–	–	45%	–	29%
Public Opinion Strategies (R-Schuette)	May 22–24, 2018	500	± 4.4%	19%	6%	1%	42%	–	–
Public Opinion Strategies (R-Schuette)	April 29 – May 1, 2018	600	± 4.0%	20%	6%	2%	42%	–	–
Glengariff Group	April 19–21, 2018	400	± 4.9%	23%	4%	1%	36%	0%	34%
Denno Research	April 2–3, 2018	500	± 4.0%	13%	4%	1%	23%	–	59%
Strategic National (R)	March 19–20, 2018	400	± 4.9%	18%	7%	3%	27%	–	45%
Marketing Resource Group	March 13–17, 2018	600	± 4.0%	13%	2%	2%	29%	–	54%
Public Opinion Strategies (R-Schuette)	February 10–13, 2018	800	± 3.4%	15%	5%	2%	42%	–	–
Strategic National (R)	December 16–17, 2017	600	± 4.0%	19%	5%	2%	30%	–	44%
Target-Insyght	November 1–6, 2017	400	± 5.0%	14%	<5%	<5%	38%	–	–
Mitchell Research	September 21–24, 2017	400	± 5.0%	13%	–	–	52%	–	36%
Marketing Resource Group	September 13–18, 2017	216	± 4.0%	13%	3%	3%	33%	–	48%
Target-Insyght	July 25–27, 2017	344	± 5.4%	14%	4%	1%	42%	–	39%
Marketing Resource Group	May 8–11, 2017	216	± 4.0%	11%	–	7%	32%	–	51%

Hypothetical polling

Poll source	Date(s) administered	Sample size	Margin of error	Brian Calley	Jim Hines	Arlan Meekhof	Candice Miller	Bill Schuette	Undecided
Mitchell Research	May 31, 2017	435	± 4.7%	14%	1%	–	21%	18%	46%
Target-Insyght	February 2–4, 2016	400	± 5%	11%	–	3%	20%	21%	45%

=== Results ===
Results by county Schuette: 30–40%; 40–50%; 50–60%; 60–70%; Calley: 30–40%; 40–50%; 50–60%

Republican primary results
Party	Candidate	Votes	%
Republican	Bill Schuette	501,959	50.7
Republican	Brian Calley	249,185	25.2
Republican	Patrick Colbeck	129,646	13.1
Republican	Jim Hines	108,735	11.0
Total votes		989,525	100.0

== Democratic primary ==
=== Candidates ===
==== Nominated ====
- Gretchen Whitmer, former Ingham County prosecuting attorney and former minority leader of the Michigan Senate

==== Eliminated in primary ====
- Abdul El-Sayed, former executive director of the Detroit Department of Health and Wellness Promotion
- Shri Thanedar, author and entrepreneur

==== Write-In ====
- Bill C. Cobbs, businessman

==== Declined ====
- John Austin, former president of the Michigan Board of Education
- Mark Bernstein, member of University of Michigan Board of Regents
- Mike Duggan, mayor of Detroit
- Geoffrey Fieger, attorney and nominee for governor in 1998
- Mark Hackel, Macomb County executive
- Dan Kildee, U.S. representative
- Andy Levin, energy consultant and son of Congressman Sander Levin (ran for Congress in MI-9)
- Barbara McQuade, former U.S. attorney for the Eastern District of Michigan
- Gary Peters, U.S. senator
- Matt Simoncini, CEO of Lear Corporation
- Bart Stupak, former U.S. representative

=== Endorsements ===
Gretchen Whitmer

U.S. senators

- Carl Levin, former U.S. senator from Michigan (1979-2015)

U.S. representatives

- Debbie Dingell, U.S. representative (MI-12)
- Dan Kildee, U.S. representative (MI-05)
- Brenda Lawrence, U.S. representative (MI-14)
- Sander Levin, U.S. representative (MI-09)

State officials

- James Blanchard, former governor of Michigan (1983–1991)
- Frank J. Kelley, former attorney general of Michigan (1961–1999)

Local officials

- Mike Duggan, mayor of Detroit

Organizations

- AFL-CIO
- American Federation of Teachers-Michigan
- Emily's List
- Michigan Education Association
- Service Employees International Union
- Teamsters Local 43
- United Auto Workers

Newspapers

- The Detroit News
Abdul El-Sayed

U.S. senators

- Bernie Sanders, U.S. senator from Vermont (Independent)

U.S. representatives

- Ro Khanna, U.S. representative (CA-17)

State legislators

- Abdullah Hammoud, state representative

Organizations

- Ann Arbor for Revolution
- Democracy for America
- Grand Rapids United Progressives
- Justice Democrats
- Lansing for Revolution
- Michigan for Revolution
- Michigan Nurses Association
- Millennials for Revolution
- Oakland County for Revolution
- Our Revolution
- The People for Bernie Sanders
- Progressive Change Campaign Committee

Newspapers and publications

- Current Affairs
- The Nation

Political candidates

- Kerri Evelyn Harris, Democratic candidate for U.S. Senate, Delaware
- Alexandria Ocasio-Cortez, Democratic nominee for U.S. representative (NY-14)

Individuals

- Ben Affleck, actor
- Danny DeVito, actor
- Alex Ebert, musician
- Shaun King, activist
- Michael Moore, documentarian and activist
- Ameya Pawar, Chicago alderman
- Piper Perabo, actress
- Joseph Sanberg, entrepreneur and investor
- Nina Turner, former Ohio state senator and president of Our Revolution

=== Debates ===
Host network	Date	Participants		
Host network	Date	Abdul El-Sayed	Shri Thanedar	Gretchen Whitmer
WOOD-TV	June 20, 2018	Invited	Invited	Invited
WDIV-TV	July 19, 2018	Invited	Invited	Invited

=== Polling ===
Poll source	Date(s) administered	Sample size	Margin of error	Bill Cobbs	Abdul El-Sayed	Shri Thanedar	Gretchen Whitmer	Other	Undecided
EPIC-MRA	July 21–22, 2018	1,054	± 3.1%	–	19%	22%	49%	–	10%
Change Research (D-El-Sayed)	July 20–21, 2018	1,503	–	–	27%	15%	33%	–	24%
Emerson College	July 19–21, 2018	282	± 6.4%	–	12%	17%	39%	–	31%
Marist College	July 15–19, 2018	442	± 5.5%	–	22%	27%	31%	<1%	20%
Target-Insyght	June 24–26, 2018	400	± 5.0%	–	17%	19%	40%	2%	22%
Glengariff Group	April 20–22, 2018	400	± 4.9%	3%	7%	30%	26%	–	35%
Denno Research	April 6–7, 2018	500	± 4.0%	2%	2%	15%	17%	–	63%
Marketing Resource Group	March 13–17, 2018	233	± 6.4%	3%	10%	21%	18%	–	48%
Target-Insyght	March 6–8, 2018	500	± 4.5%	4%	6%	20%	34%	3%	33%
EPIC-MRA (D-Thanedar)	February 17–22, 2018	600	± 4.0%	3%	8%	24%	34%	–	31%
Target-Insyght	November 1–6, 2017	400	± 5.0%	4%	13%	2%	45%	8%	28%
Marketing Resource Group	September 13–18, 2017	255	± 4.0%	8%	4%	3%	27%	–	58%

Hypothetical polling

Poll source	Date(s) administered	Sample size	Margin of error	Mike Duggan	Abdul El-Sayed	Geoffrey Fieger	Mark Hackel	Dan Kildee	Andy Levin	Shri Thanedar	Gretchen Whitmer	Undecided
Target-Insyght	November 1–6, 2017	400	± 5.0%	29%	–	–	–	–	–	–	43%	–
Target-Insyght	November 1–6, 2017	400	± 5.0%	–	–	28%	–	–	–	–	41%	–
Target-Insyght	November 1–6, 2017	400	± 5.0%	–	–	–	–	–	19%	–	42%	–
Target-Insyght	February 2–4, 2016	400	± 5%	20%	–	–	9%	12%	–	–	16%	43%
Target-Insyght	July 25, 2017	377	± 5.4%	–	4%	35%	–	–	–	3%	35%	–
Marketing Resource Group	May 8–11, 2017	255	± 4.0%	–	9%	26%	–	–	–	–	24%	41%

=== Results ===
Results by county Whitmer: 40–50%; 50–60%; 60–70%

Democratic primary results
Party	Candidate	Votes	%
Democratic	Gretchen Whitmer	588,436	52.0
Democratic	Abdul El-Sayed	342,179	30.2
Democratic	Shri Thanedar	200,645	17.7
Total votes		1,131,447	100.0

== Libertarian primary ==
The Libertarian Party is one of three parties that have a primary in Michigan.

=== Candidates ===
==== Nominated ====
- Bill Gelineau

==== Eliminated in primary ====
- John Tatar

=== Endorsements ===
John Tatar

Organizations

- Michigan Vaccine Freedom PAC

=== Debates ===
Host network	Date	Participants	
Host network	Date	Bill Gelineau	John Tatar
WOOD-TV	July 15, 2018	Invited	Invited
WJBK-TV	July 22, 2018	Invited	Invited

=== Results ===
Libertarian primary results
Party	Candidate	Votes	%
Libertarian	Bill Gelineau	4,034	57.8
Libertarian	John Tatar	2,941	42.2
Total votes		6,975	100.0

== Green Convention ==
The Green Party chose candidates for the 2018 ballot at its state convention on May 5, 2018, at the University of Michigan-Flint.

=== Candidates ===
==== Declared and nominated ====
- Jennifer Kurland, president of the Redford Union School Board

== U.S. Taxpayers Party ==
=== Candidates ===
==== Declared and nominated ====
- Todd Schleiger

== Natural Law Party ==
=== Candidates ===
==== Declared and nominated ====
- Keith Butkovich

== General election ==
=== Predictions ===
Source	Ranking	As of
The Cook Political Report	Lean D (flip)	October 26, 2018
The Washington Post	Lean D (flip)	November 5, 2018
FiveThirtyEight	Likely D (flip)	November 5, 2018
Rothenberg Political Report	Lean D (flip)	November 1, 2018
Sabato's Crystal Ball	Likely D (flip)	November 5, 2018
RealClearPolitics	Lean D (flip)	November 4, 2018
Daily Kos	Likely D (flip)	November 5, 2018
Fox News (Note: The Fox News Midterm Power Rankings uniquely does not contain a category for Safe/Solid races.)	Likely D (flip)	November 5, 2018
Politico	Likely D (flip)	November 5, 2018
Governing	Lean D (flip)	November 5, 2018

=== Endorsements ===
Bill Schuette (R)

U.S. executive branch officials

- Mike Pence, 48th vice president of the United States (2017–2021), former governor of Indiana (2013–2017) and former U.S. representative (IN-6/IN-2) (2001–2013)
- Donald Trump, 45th president of the United States (2017–2021)

U.S. governors

- John Engler, former governor of Michigan (1991–2003)
- Scott Walker, governor of Wisconsin (2011–2019)

U.S. representatives

- Jack Bergman, U.S. representative (MI-1) (2017–present)
- Mike Bishop, U.S. representative (MI-8) (2015–2019)
- Candice Miller, Macomb County public works commissioner (2017–present) and former U.S. representative (MI-10) (2003–2016)
- Paul Mitchell, U.S. representative (MI-10) (2017–2021)
- John Moolenaar, U.S. representative (MI-4) (2015–present)
- Dave Trott, U.S. representative (MI-11) (2017–2019)
- Tim Walberg, U.S. representative (MI-7) (2011–present)

State representatives

- Julie Alexander
- Sue Allor
- Tom Barrett
- Lee Chatfield
- Triston Cole
- Laura Cox
- Diana Farrington
- Ben Frederick
- Gary Glenn
- Joseph Graves
- Roger Hauck
- Michele Hoitenga
- Pamela Hornberger
- Gary Howell
- Tim Kelly
- Klint Kesto
- Beau LaFave
- Daniel Lauwers
- Eric Leutheuser
- Peter Lucido
- Steve Marino
- Mike McCready
- Aaron Miller
- Daire Rendon
- Jim Runestad
- Jason Sheppard
- Jim Tedder
- Curt VanderWall
- Scott VanSingel
- Hank Vaupel
- Rob VerHeulen
- Jason Wentworth
- Mary Whiteford
- Jeff Yaroch

State senators

- Darwin Booher
- Jack Brandenburg
- Tom Casperson
- Mike Green
- Goeff Hansen
- Kenneth Horn
- Joe Hune
- Rick Jones
- Jim Marleau
- Phil Pavlov
- John Proos
- David B. Robertson
- Jim Stamas

Organizations

- Associated Builders and Contractors of Michigan
- Detroit Fire Fighters Association
- Detroit Police Officers Association
- Michigan Chamber of Commerce
- Michigan Farm Bureau
- Michigan Realtors
- Michigan Restaurant Association
- National Federation of Independent Business
- NRA Political Victory Fund
- Police Officers Association of Michigan
- Right to Life of Michigan
- Small Business Association of Michigan
- The Young Republicans Club of Dearborn High School

Local officials

- Mike Bouchard, sheriff of Oakland County and former Michigan state senator
- L. Brooks Patterson, county executive of Oakland County, Michigan

Individuals

- Pam Bondi, Florida attorney general (2011–2019)
- Donald Trump Jr., businessman and son of U.S. President Donald Trump
Gretchen Whitmer (D)

U.S. executive branch officials

- Joe Biden, 47th vice president of the United States (2009–2017) and former U.S senator from Delaware (1973–2009)
- Hillary Clinton, 67th United States secretary of state (2009–2013), former U.S. senator from New York (2001–2009), former First Lady of the United States (1993–2001), 2016 Democratic nominee for president
- Eric Holder, 82nd United States attorney general (2009–2015)
- Barack Obama, 44th president of the United States (2009–2017) and former U.S. senator from Illinois (2005–2008)

U.S. senators

- Kirsten Gillibrand, U.S. senator from New York (2009–present) and former U.S. representative (NY-20) (2007–2009)
- Gary Peters, U.S. senator from Michigan (2015–present) and former U.S. representative (MI-9/MI-14) (2009–2015)
- Bernie Sanders, U.S senator from Vermont (2007–present) and former U.S. representative (VT-AL) (1991–2007) (Independent)
- Debbie Stabenow, U.S. senator from Michigan (2001–present) and former U.S. representative (MI-8) (1997–2001)

U.S. representatives

- Debbie Dingell, U.S. representative (MI-12) (2015–present)
- Dan Kildee, U.S. representative (MI-5) (2013–present)
- Brenda Lawrence, U.S. representative (MI-14) (2015–present)
- Sander Levin, U.S. representative (MI-9) (1983–2019)
- Joe Schwarz, former Republican U.S. representative (MI-7) (2005–2007) (Independent)

Governors

- James Blanchard, former governor of Michigan (1983–1991)
- John D. Cherry, former lieutenant governor of Michigan (2003–2011)
- Jennifer Granholm, former governor of Michigan (2003–2011)
- Jay Inslee, governor of Washington (2013–present)

State officials

- Steve Bieda, state senator
- Warren Evans, Wayne County executive
- Pam Farris, state representative
- Sherry Gay-Dagnogo, state representative
- Erika Geiss, state representative
- Patrick Green, state representative
- Vincent Gregory, state senator
- Curtis Hertel, state senator
- Curtis Hertel Jr., state senator
- Morris Hood III, state senator
- Hoon-Yung Hopgood, state senator
- Frank Kelley, former Michigan attorney general
- Leslie Love, state representative
- Jeremy Moss, state representative
- Benny Napoleon, sheriff of Wayne County
- Ronnie Peterson, state representative
- Sam Singh, minority leader of the Michigan House of Representatives
- Tim Snelller, state representative
- Rebekah Warren, state senator
- Kym Worthy, Wayne County prosecutor

Local officials

- David Coulter, mayor of Ferndale
- Mike Duggan, mayor of Detroit

Labor unions

- American Federation of Teachers
- International Association of Bridge, Structural, Ornamental and Reinforcing Iron Workers Local 25
- Michigan AFL–CIO
- Michigan Building and Construction Trades Council
- Michigan Education Association
- Michigan Joint Council of the Retail, Wholesale and Department Store Union
- Michigan Pipe Trades Association
- Michigan Regional Council of Carpenters and Millwrights
- Michigan State Conference of International Brotherhood of Electrical Workers
- Michigan State Utility Workers Council
- Teamsters Local 299
- United Association of Journeymen and Apprentices of the Plumbing, Pipefitting and Sprinkler Fitting Industry of the United States and Canada Local 636 (UA)
- United Automobile Workers

Organizations

- EMILY's List
- MI List (MI chapter of EMILY's List)

Individuals

- Jan Bidwell, social worker and activist
- Abdul El Sayed, candidate for governor
- Chelsea Handler, actress
- Cecile Richards, activist
Bill Gelineau (L)

Individuals

- Mary Buzuma, 2014 candidate for governor
- Greg Creswell, 2006 candidate for governor
- Kenneth Proctor, 2010 candidate for governor
Todd Schleiger (USTP)

Organizations

- The Education Watchdogs
- The Modern Whig Party
- Protect OutStolen Treasures
Declined to endorse

State officials

- Rick Snyder, 48th governor of Michigan (2011–2019)

=== Polling ===
View source data.

Poll source	Date(s) administered	Sample size	Margin of error	Bill Schuette (R)	Gretchen Whitmer (D)	Bill Gelineau (L)	Other	Undecided
Mitchell Research	November 5, 2018	827	± 3.4%	41%	48%	–	5%	6%
Mitchell Research	November 4, 2018	701	± 3.7%	40%	54%	–	1%	1%
Change Research	November 2–4, 2018	880	–	43%	51%	2%	3%	–
Research Co.	November 1–3, 2018	450	± 4.6%	43%	47%	–	1%	9%
Glengariff Group	October 25–27, 2018	600	± 4.0%	38%	50%	2%	2%	9%
Emerson College	October 24–26, 2018	822	± 3.6%	41%	52%	–	3%	4%
Mitchell Research	October 25, 2018	400	± 5.0%	43%	48%	–	4%	4%
Target-Insyght	October 22–24, 2018	800	± 3.0%	44%	48%	1%	4%	4%
EPIC-MRA	October 18–23, 2018	600	± 4.0%	41%	46%	3%	3%	7%
Michigan State University	October 13–22, 2018	169	–	39%	47%	–	–	–
ALG Research (D) (Note: Poll conducted for Whitmer's campaign.)	October 15–21, 2018	906	± 3.3%	36%	47%	4%	6%	11%
ALG Research (D)	October 15–21, 2018	906	± 3.3%	38%	48%	–	–	13%
Marketing Resource Group	October 14–18, 2018	600	± 4.0%	36%	50%	2%	4%	7%
ALG Research (D)	October 8–14, 2018	800	± 3.5%	36%	46%	3%	2%	13%
Mitchell Research	September 30 – October 7, 2018	654	± 3.8%	38%	46%	–	6%	10%
Glengariff Group	September 30 – October 2, 2018	600	± 4.0%	35%	47%	–	5%	13%
ALG Research (D)	September 24–30, 2018	800	± 3.5%	37%	49%	2%	2%	10%
EPIC-MRA	September 21–25, 2018	600	± 4.0%	37%	45%	2%	5%	11%
Ipsos	September 14–24, 2018	1,150	± 3.0%	39%	52%	–	4%	6%
Target-Insyght	September 10–14, 2018	800	± 3.0%	41%	50%	–	–	–
Mitchell Research	September 12–13, 2018	1,009	± 3.0%	38%	48%	–	5%	9%
ALG Research (D)	September 8–13, 2018	798	± 3.5%	38%	45%	3%	3%	11%
Strategic National (R)	September 8–9, 2018	1,000	± 3.1%	39%	49%	–	–	12%
Glengariff Group	September 5–7, 2018	600	± 4.0%	36%	50%	2%	4%	10%
Gravis Marketing	August 14–16, 2018	647	± 3.9%	37%	52%	–	–	11%
Strategic National (R)	August 13–14, 2018	700	± 3.7%	36%	45%	–	2%	17%
Emerson College	July 19–21, 2018	600	± 4.3%	36%	43%	–	9%	12%
Marist College	July 15–19, 2018	886	± 3.9%	38%	47%	–	1%	14%
Target-Insyght	June 24–26, 2018	800	± 3.0%	37%	42%	–	–	20%
NMB Research (R)	June 18–21, 2018	800	± 3.5%	39%	40%	–	–	20%
EPIC-MRA	April 30 – May 3, 2018	600	± 4.0%	38%	43%	–	–	19%
Glengariff Group	January 16–19, 2018	600	± 4.0%	33%	40%	–	–	25%
Michigan State University	September 14, 2017 – January 18, 2018	963	± 3.2%	35%	41%	–	–	24%
EPIC-MRA	December 9–13, 2017	600	± 4.0%	38%	35%	–	–	27%
Target-Insyght	November 1–6, 2017	1,000	± 3.6%	40%	41%	–	–	19%
EPIC-MRA	August 27 – September 1, 2017	600	± 4.0%	37%	37%	–	–	26%

Hypothetical polling

with Bill Schuette and Abdul El-Sayed

Poll source	Date(s) administered	Sample size	Margin of error	Bill Schuette (R)	Abdul El-Sayed (D)	Other	Undecided
Emerson College	July 19–21, 2018	600	± 4.3%	38%	33%	12%	17%
Glengariff Group	January 16–19, 2018	600	± 4.0%	38%	34%	–	27%

with Bill Schuette and Shri Thanedar

Poll source	Date(s) administered	Sample size	Margin of error	Bill Schuette (R)	Shri Thanedar (D)	Other	Undecided
Emerson College	July 19–21, 2018	600	± 4.3%	35%	38%	12%	15%
Target-Insyght	June 24–26, 2018	800	± 3.0%	37%	40%	–	22%
NMB Research (R-Better Jobs PAC)	June 18–21, 2018	800	± 3.5%	40%	40%	–	19%
EPIC-MRA	April 30 – May 3, 2018	600	± 4.0%	38%	44%	–	18%

with Brian Calley and Gretchen Whitmer

Poll source	Date(s) administered	Sample size	Margin of error	Brian Calley (R)	Gretchen Whitmer (D)	Other	Undecided
Emerson College	July 19–21, 2018	600	± 4.3%	33%	44%	8%	16%
Michigan State University	September 14, 2017 – January 18, 2018	963	± 3.2%	34%	42%	–	24%

with Brian Calley and Shri Thanedar

Poll source	Date(s) administered	Sample size	Margin of error	Brian Calley (R)	Shri Thanedar (D)	Other	Undecided
Emerson College	July 19–21, 2018	600	± 4.3%	38%	36%	12%	14%

with Bill Schuette and Geoffrey Fieger

Poll source	Date(s) administered	Sample size	Margin of error	Bill Schuette (R)	Geoffrey Fieger (D)	Undecided
Target-Insyght	November 1–6, 2017	1,000	± 3.6%	42%	35%	23%
EPIC-MRA	August 27 – September 1, 2017	600	± 4%	43%	33%	24%

with Bill Schuette and Mike Duggan

Poll source	Date(s) administered	Sample size	Margin of error	Bill Schuette (R)	Mike Duggan (D)	Undecided
Target-Insyght	November 1–6, 2017	1,000	± 3.6%	32%	47%	21%

=== Fundraising ===
Campaign finance reports as of August 27, 2018
Candidate (party)	Total receipts	Total disbursements	Cash on hand
Gretchen Whitmer (D)	$7,134,218.66	$5,599,850.57	$1,534,368.09
Bill Schuette (R)	$6,175,889.09	$4,741,577.63	$1,434,311.46
Bill Gelineau (L)	$54,785.88	$51,267.71	$3,518.17
Source: Michigan Department of State

=== Debates ===
Two televised debates between Schuette and Whitmer were scheduled. The first was held on Friday, October 12, and hosted by Grand Rapids television station WOOD-TV. That debate mainly concentrated on issues and there were no surprises or major errors from either candidate. The second debate was hosted by Detroit television station WDIV, and was held on Wednesday, October 24. The two again clashed on various issues. Schuette made a gaffe when he mixed up Whitmer's name with that of former governor Jennifer Granholm.

=== Campaign ===
While Whitmer's Democratic primary opponents publicly endorsed Whitmer in the general election, Republican nominee Schuette left the party split after the acrimonious battle with Lieutenant Governor Calley, with outgoing Governor Rick Snyder refusing to endorse Schuette. Schuette also tried to hide his endorsement by Donald Trump from the primary in the general election. His actions as attorney general also came back to haunt him. Whitmer held consistent leads in polls over Schuette over the entire year.

=== Results ===
2018 Michigan gubernatorial election
Party	Candidate	Votes	%	±%
Democratic	Gretchen Whitmer	2,266,193	53.31%	+6.45%
Republican	Bill Schuette	1,859,534	43.75%	−7.17%
Libertarian	Bill Gelineau	56,606	1.33%	+0.20%
U.S. Taxpayers'	Todd Schleiger	29,219	0.69%	+0.08%
Green	Jennifer Kurland	28,799	0.68%	+0.21%
Natural Law	Keith Butkovich	10,202	0.24%	N/A
Write-in		32	0.00%	0.00%
Total votes		4,250,585	100.00%	N/A
Democratic gain from Republican				

==== By county ====
County	Gretchen Whitmer Democratic		Bill Schuette Republican		Various candidates Other parties		Margin		Total
County	#	%	#	%	#	%	#	%	Total
Alcona	1,982	35.8%	3,408	61.6%	144	2.6%	-1,426	-25.8%	5,534
Alger	1,950	46.9%	2,097	50.4%	112	2.7%	-147	-3.5%	4,159
Allegan	19,497	39.1%	28,648	57.5%	1,708	3.4%	-9,151	-18.4%	49,853
Alpena	5,595	42.8%	7,031	53.8%	446	3.4%	-1,436	-11.0%	13,072
Antrim	5,025	39.0%	7,480	58.0%	395	3.0%	-2,455	-19.0%	12,900
Arenac	2,631	38.9%	3,881	57.4%	246	3.7%	-1,250	-18.5%	6,758
Baraga	1,356	41.9%	1,789	55.3%	92	2.8%	-433	-13.4%	3,237
Barry	10,272	38.2%	15,573	58.0%	1,013	3.7%	-5,301	-21.8%	26,858
Bay	23,159	49.8%	21,847	47.0%	1,525	3.3%	1,312	2.8%	46,531
Benzie	4,551	46.5%	4,963	50.7%	279	2.8%	-412	-4.2%	9,793
Berrien	27,861	44.9%	32,161	51.8%	2,014	3.3%	-4,300	-6.9%	62,036
Branch	5,324	35.0%	9,381	61.7%	507	3.3%	-4,057	-26.7%	15,212
Calhoun	23,484	46.9%	24,711	49.4%	1,849	3.7%	-1,227	-2.5%	50,044
Cass	7,255	37.3%	11,538	59.3%	664	3.5%	-4,283	-22.0%	19,457
Charlevoix	5,720	41.8%	7,556	55.2%	401	3.0%	-1,836	-13.4%	13,677
Cheboygan	4,838	38.5%	7,249	57.7%	468	2.49%	-2,411	-19.2%	12,555
Chippewa	6,187	44.3%	7,381	52.8%	410	2.9%	-1,194	-8.5%	13,978
Clare	4,424	37.4%	6,955	58.8%	457	3.8%	-2,531	-21.4%	11,836
Clinton	18,495	49.8%	17,649	47.5%	1,013	2.7%	846	2.3%	37,157
Crawford	2,367	37.8%	3,613	57.7%	279	4.4%	-1,246	-19.9%	6,259
Delta	6,991	42.6%	9,061	55.1%	378	2.3%	-2,070	-12.5%	16,430
Dickinson	4,119	36.3%	6,914	61.0%	300	2.7%	-2,795	-25.7%	11,333
Eaton	27,003	52.8%	22,438	43.9%	1,665	3.2%	4,565	8.9%	51,106
Emmet	7,788	43.6%	9,539	53.3%	555	3.1%	-1,751	-9.7%	17,882
Genesee	100,073	59.4%	63,537	37.7%	4,935	2.9%	36,536	21.7%	168,545
Gladwin	4,155	37.8%	6,512	59.2%	338	3.1%	-2,357	-21.4%	11,005
Gogebic	3,312	50.9%	3,003	46.2%	192	2.9%	309	4.7%	6,507
Grand Traverse	23,220	47.6%	24,031	49.2%	1,550	3.1%	-811	-1.8%	48,801
Gratiot	6,170	43.0%	7,690	53.6%	493	3.4%	-1,520	-10.6%	14,353
Hillsdale	5,166	30.7%	11,088	65.9%	567	3.3%	-5,922	-35.2%	16,821
Houghton	6,539	45.7%	7,372	51.5%	400	2.7%	-833	-5.8%	14,311
Huron	4,828	35.2%	8,519	62.0%	385	2.8%	-3,691	-26.8%	13,732
Ingham	80,292	67.3%	35,579	29.8%	3,359	2.8%	44,713	37.5%	119,230
Ionia	9,929	41.7%	13,007	54.6%	894	3.8%	-3,078	-12.9%	23,830
Iosco	4,772	40.8%	6,534	55.9%	384	3.2%	-1,762	-15.1%	11,690
Iron	2,269	42.0%	2,970	55.0%	164	3.0%	-701	-13.0%	5,403
Isabella	11,656	51.8%	10,097	44.9%	732	3.2%	1,559	6.9%	22,485
Jackson	26,704	43.9%	32,021	52.6%	2,127	3.5%	-5,317	-8.7%	60,852
Kalamazoo	67,023	58.4%	44,183	38.5%	3,656	3.2%	22,840	19.9%	114,862
Kalkaska	2,782	33.3%	5,190	62.1%	385	4.6%	-2,408	-28.8%	8,357
Kent	141,629	50.5%	129,988	46.4%	8,674	3.1%	11,641	4.1%	280,291
Keweenaw	571	43.4%	707	53.7%	38	2.9%	-136	-10.3%	1,316
Lake	1,904	40.5%	2,602	55.4%	194	4.1%	-698	-14.9%	4,700
Lapeer	14,798	37.6%	23,209	58.9%	1,365	3.5%	-8,411	-19.3%	39,372
Leelanau	7,264	51.1%	6,630	46.7%	308	2.2%	634	4.4%	14,202
Lenawee	17,624	44.0%	21,225	53.0%	1,203	3.0%	-3,601	-9.0%	40,052
Livingston	39,187	40.2%	55,842	57.2%	2,549	2.6%	-16,655	-17.0%	97,578
Luce	851	35.2%	1,469	60.7%	100	4.1%	-618	-25.5%	2,420
Mackinac	2,345	41.0%	3,229	56.5%	142	2.5%	-884	-15.5%	5,716
Macomb	181,603	50.4%	169,073	46.9%	9,550	2.7%	12,530	3.5%	260,226
Manistee	5,420	46.3%	5,928	50.6%	369	3.2%	-508	-4.3%	11,717
Marquette	17,173	57.2%	11,963	39.9%	866	2.9%	5,210	17.3%	30,002
Mason	5,823	42.5%	7,420	54.1%	467	3.4%	-1,597	-11.6%	13,170
Mecosta	6,408	40.9%	8,686	55.5%	560	3.6%	-2,278	-14.6%	15,654
Menominee	3,528	40.2%	5,030	57.3%	226	2.5%	-1,502	-17.1%	8,784
Midland	16,238	42.2%	21,215	55.1%	1,052	2.7%	-4,977	-12.9%	38,505
Missaukee	1,759	26.8%	4,641	70.7%	166	2.5%	-2,882	-43.9%	6,556
Monroe	27,413	44.5%	32,336	52.5%	1,790	3.0%	-4,923	-8.0%	61,539
Montcalm	9,003	38.5%	13,408	57.4%	946	4.1%	-4,405	-18.9%	23,357
Montmorency	1,508	32.6%	2,976	64.3%	141	4.1%	-1,468	-31.7%	4,625
Muskegon	37,029	50.3%	29,665	40.3%	6,976	9.4%	7,374	10.0%	73,660
Newaygo	6,944	34.2%	12,621	62.1%	762	3.8%	-5,677	-27.9%	20,327
Oakland	347,080	57.3%	244,417	40.4%	13,770	2.3%	102,663	16.9%	605,267
Oceana	4,260	39.6%	6,151	57.2%	346	3.2%	-1,891	-17.6%	10,757
Ogemaw	3,335	36.5%	5,471	59.9%	328	3.6%	-2,136	-23.4%	9,134
Ontonagon	1,293	41.2%	1,741	55.4%	106	3.4%	-448	-14.2%	3,140
Osceola	2,901	30.9%	6,098	64.9%	392	4.2%	-3,197	-34.0%	9,391
Oscoda	1,226	32.9%	2,379	63.7%	127	3.4%	-1,153	-30.8%	3,732
Otsego	4,064	35.8%	6,903	60.8%	389	3.4%	-2,839	-25.0%	11,356
Ottawa	47,380	36.8%	77,691	60.4%	3,517	2.7%	-30,311	-23.6%	128,588
Presque Isle	2,704	40.5%	3,751	56.2%	222	3.3%	-1,047	-15.7%	6,677
Roscommon	4,561	38.7%	6,859	58.1%	380	3.2%	-2,298	-19.4%	11,800
Saginaw	42,693	52.7%	36,303	44.8%	1,999	2.4%	6,387	7.9%	80,998
Sanilac	5,383	32.8%	10,443	63.7%	576	3.4%	-5,060	-28.9%	16,402
Schoolcraft	1,533	41.0%	2,094	55.9%	116	3.0%	-561	-14.9%	3,743
Shiawassee	13,834	46.4%	14,943	50.2%	1,013	3.4%	-1,109	-3.8%	29,790
St. Clair	28,089	41.7%	36,840	54.6%	2,505	3.8%	-8,751	-12.9%	67,434
St. Joseph	7,611	37.2%	11,962	58.5%	865	4.2%	-4,351	-21.3%	20,438
Tuscola	8,272	37.1%	13,286	59.6%	733	3.3%	-5,014	-22.5%	22,291
Van Buren	13,580	46.0%	14,824	50.2%	1,140	2.9%	-1,244	-4.2%	29,544
Washtenaw	124,910	72.0%	44,850	25.8%	3,748	2.2%	80,060	44.2%	173,508
Wayne	463,703	70.3%	180,057	27.3%	16,099	2.5%	283,646	40.14%	659,859
Wexford	4,995	35.7%	8,419	60.2%	562	4.1%	-3,424	-24.5%	13,976
Totals	2,266,193	53.3%	1,859,534	43.7%	124,858	2.9%	406,659	9.6%	4,250,585

Counties that flipped from Democratic to Republican

- Alger (largest city: Munising)
- Baraga (largest village: Baraga)
- Manistee (largest city: Manistee)

Counties that flipped from Republican to Democratic

- Clinton (largest city: St. Johns)
- Isabella (largest city: Mount Pleasant)
- Kalamazoo (largest city: Kalamazoo)
- Kent (largest city: Grand Rapids)
- Leelanau (largest CDP: Greilickville)
- Macomb (largest city: Warren)
- Oakland (largest city: Troy)

==== By congressional district ====
Whitmer won seven of Michigan's 14 congressional districts.

District	Schuette	Whitmer	Representative
1st	53%	44%	Jack Bergman
2nd	53%	44%	Bill Huizenga
3rd	49%	48%	Justin Amash
4th	55%	42%	John Moolenaar
5th	40%	57%	Dan Kildee
6th	48.4%	48.2%	Fred Upton
7th	51%	46%	Tim Walberg
8th	46%	51%	Mike Bishop
8th	46%	51%	Elissa Slotkin
9th	38%	59%	Sander Levin
9th	38%	59%	Andy Levin
10th	57%	41%	
10th	57%	41%	Paul Mitchell
11th	46%	52%	Dave Trott
11th	46%	52%	Haley Stevens
12th	30%	67%	Debbie Dingell
13th	16%	81%	Brenda Jones
13th	16%	81%	Rashida Tlaib
14th	18%	80%	Brenda Lawrence

== Notes ==
Partisan clients
