= 2004 United States House of Representatives elections in Michigan =

- November 2, 2004

All 15 Michigan seats to the United States House of Representatives
	Majority party	Minority party
Party	Republican	Democratic
Last election	9	6
Seats won	9	6
Seat change	Steady	Steady
Popular vote	2,288,594	2,242,435
Percentage	49.41%	48.42%
Swing	▲1.17%	▼0.90%

Republican
50–60%
60–70%
70–80%
Democratic
40–50%
50–60%
60–70%
70–80%
80–90%

The 2004 congressional elections in Michigan were held on November 2, 2004, to determine who would represent the state of Michigan in the United States House of Representatives. Michigan had fifteen seats in the House, apportioned according to the 2000 United States census. Representatives are elected for two-year terms.

== Overview ==
United States House of Representatives elections in Michigan, 2004
Party	Votes	Percentage	Seats before	Seats after	+/–
Republican	2,288,594	49.41%	9	9	-
Democratic	2,242,435	48.42%	6	6	-
Libertarian	54,093	1.17%	0	0	-
U.S. Taxpayers	23,598	0.51%	0	0	-
Green	18,365	0.40%	0	0	-
Natural Law	2,153	0.05%	0	0	-
Independent	1,818	0.04%	0	0	
Write-in	273	0.01%	0	0	-
Total	4,631,329	100.00%	15	15	—

== District 1 ==
2004 Michigan's 1st congressional district election
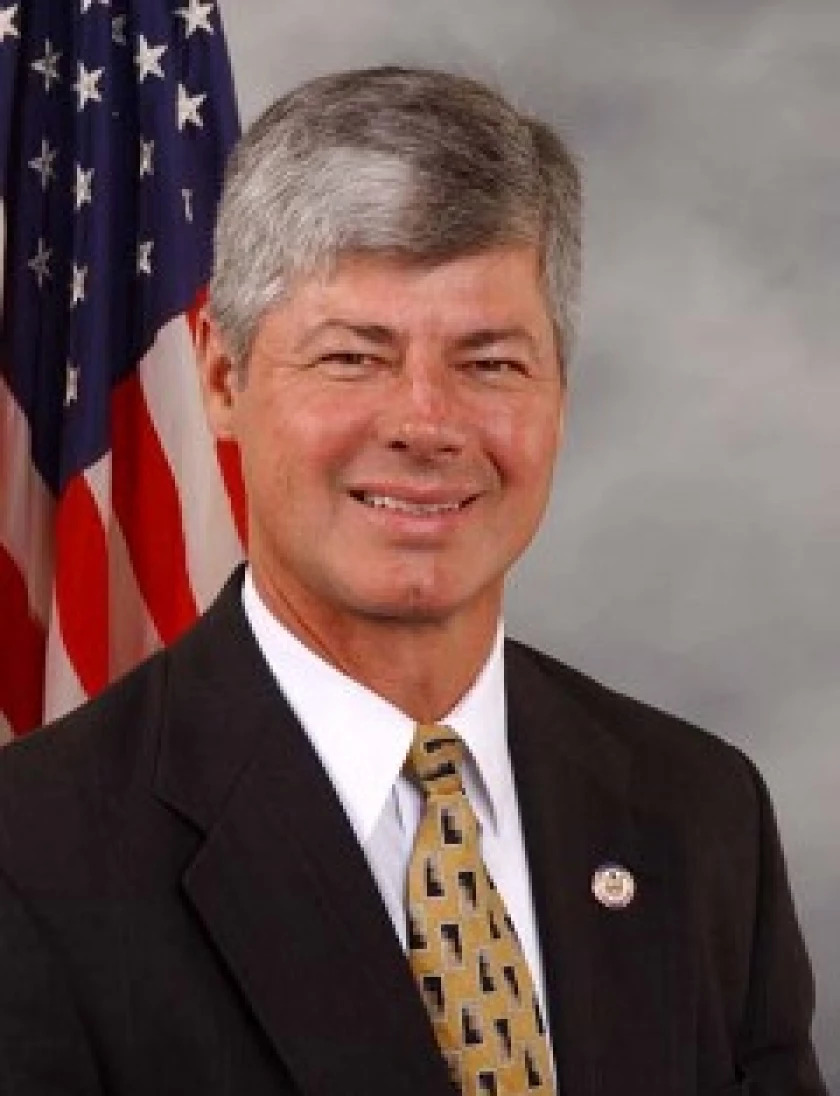

Nominee	Bart Stupak	Don Hooper
Party	Democratic	Republican
Popular vote	211,571	105,706
Percentage	65.6%	32.8%
- County results Stupak: 50–60% 60–70% 70–80%
U.S. Representative before election
Bart Stupak
Democratic
Elected U.S. Representative
Bart Stupak
Democratic

=== Predictions ===
Source	Ranking	As of
The Cook Political Report	Safe D	October 29, 2004
Sabato's Crystal Ball	Safe D	November 1, 2004

Results

Michigan's 1st congressional district election, 2004
Party	Candidate	Votes	%
Democratic	Bart Stupak	211,571	65.57%
Republican	Don Hooper	105,706	32.76%
Green	David J. Newland	3,105	0.96%
Libertarian	John W. Loosemore	2,292	0.71%
Total votes		322,674	100.00%

== District 2 ==
2004 Michigan's 2nd congressional district election
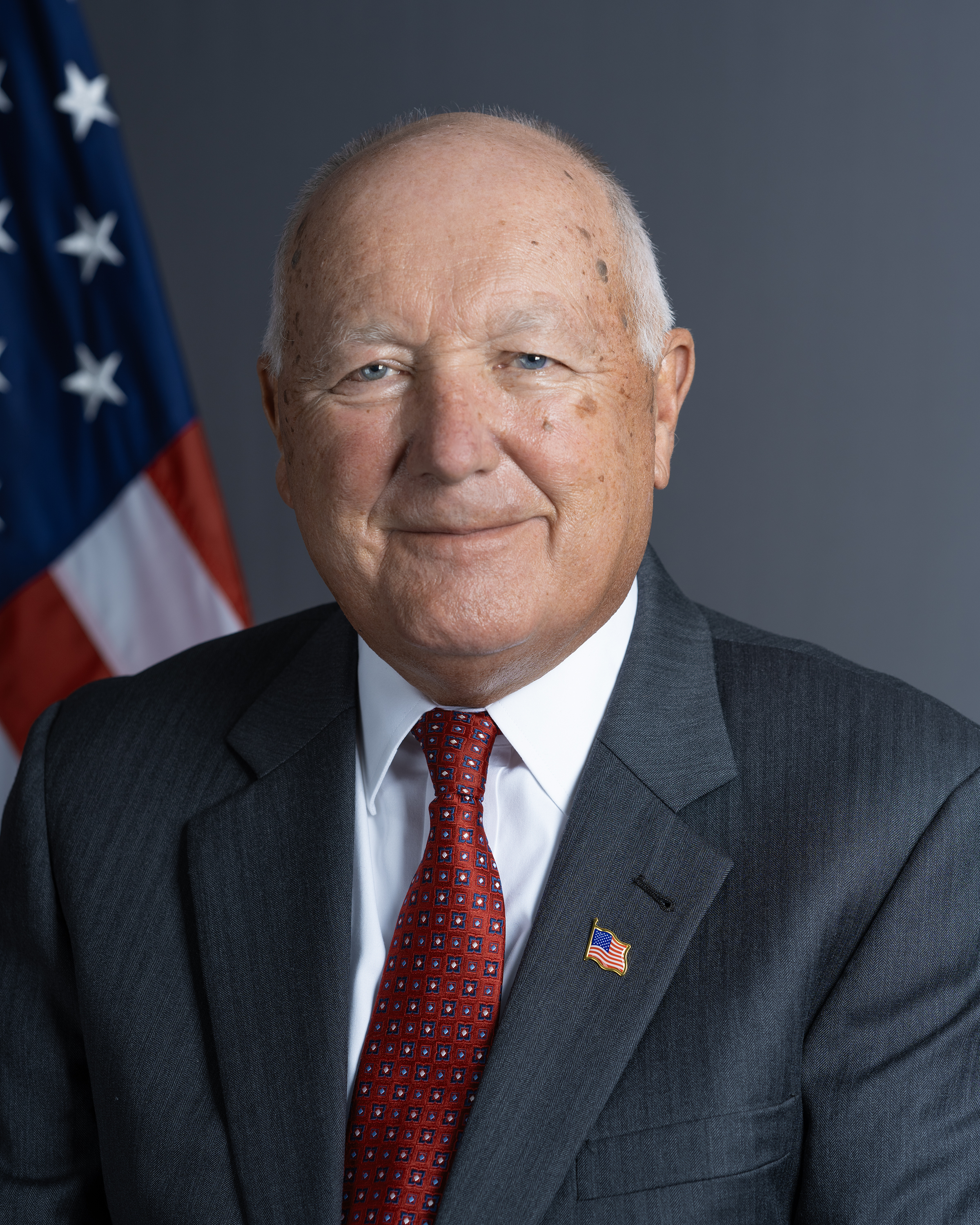

Nominee	Peter Hoekstra	Kimon Kotos
Party	Republican	Democratic
Popular vote	225,343	94,040
Percentage	69.3%	28.9%
- County results Hoekstra: 50–60% 60–70% 70–80%
U.S. Representative before election
Pete Hoekstra
Republican
Elected U.S. Representative
Peter Hoekstra
Republican

=== Predictions ===
Source	Ranking	As of
The Cook Political Report	Safe R	October 29, 2004
Sabato's Crystal Ball	Safe R	November 1, 2004

Results

Michigan's 2nd congressional district election, 2004
Party	Candidate	Votes	%
Republican	Peter Hoekstra	225,343	69.34%
Democratic	Kimon Kotos	94,040	28.93%
Libertarian	Steve VanTil	2,876	0.88%
Constitution	Ronald E. Graeser	2,746	0.84%
Total votes		325,005	100.00%

== District 3 ==
2004 Michigan's 3rd congressional district election
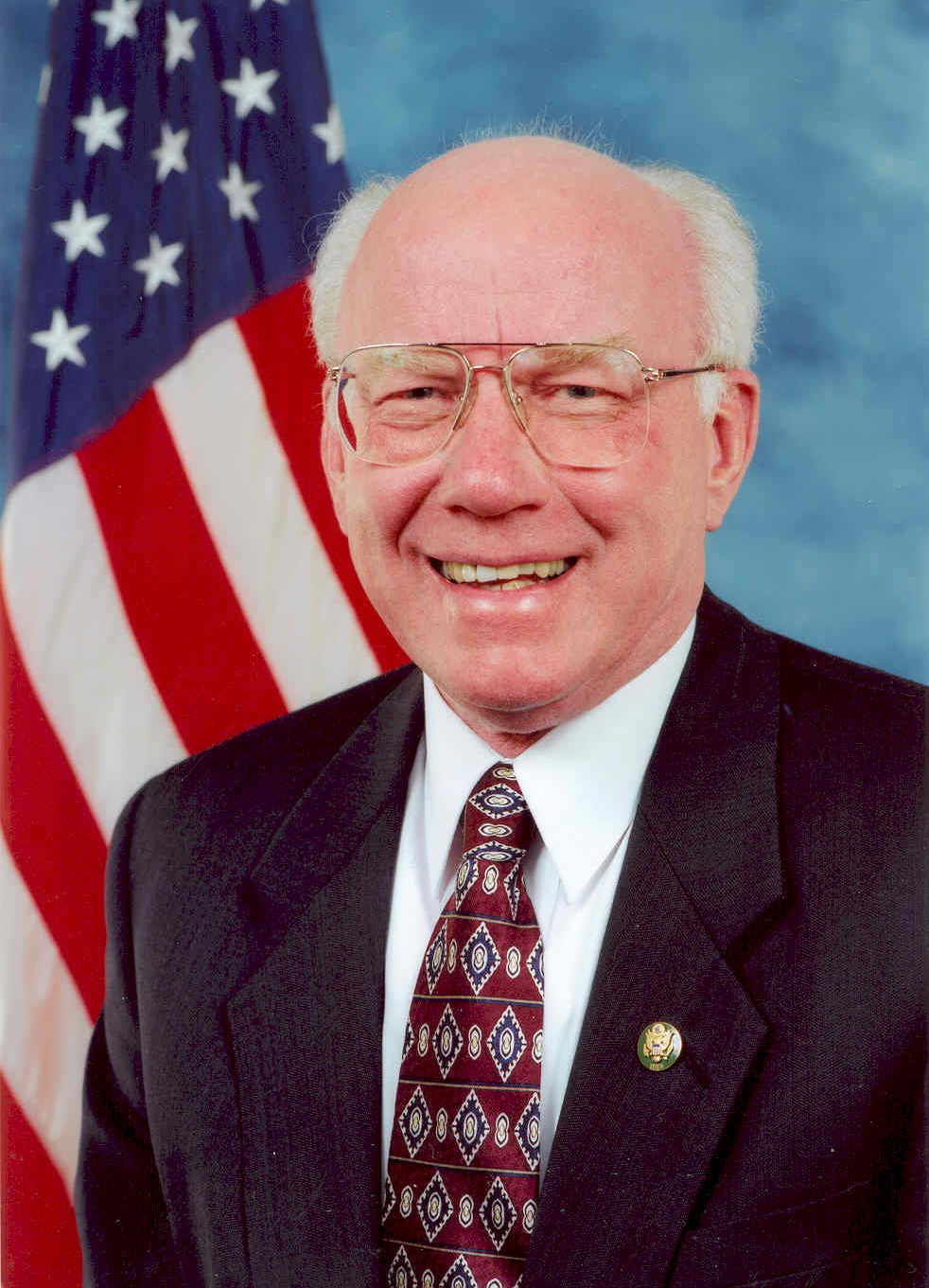

Nominee	Vernon J. Ehlers	Peter H. Hickey
Party	Republican	Democratic
Popular vote	214,465	101,395
Percentage	66.6%	31.5%
- County results Ehlers: 60–70%
U.S. Representative before election
Vern Ehlers
Republican
Elected U.S. Representative
Vernon J. Ehlers
Republican

=== Predictions ===
Source	Ranking	As of
The Cook Political Report	Safe R	October 29, 2004
Sabato's Crystal Ball	Safe R	November 1, 2004

Results

Michigan's 3rd congressional district election, 2004
Party	Candidate	Votes	%
Republican	Vernon J. Ehlers	214,465	66.58%
Democratic	Peter H. Hickey	101,395	31.48%
Libertarian	Warren Adams	3,695	1.15%
Constitution	Marcel J. Sales	2,548	0.79%
Total votes		322,103	100.00%

== District 4 ==
2004 Michigan's 4th congressional district election
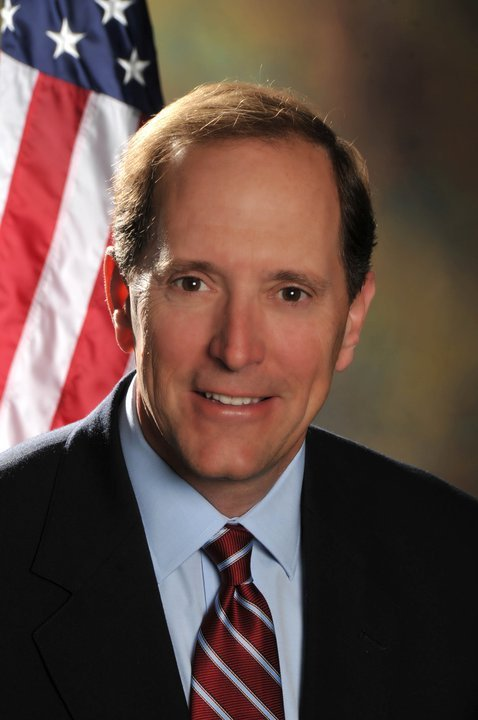

Nominee	Dave Camp	Mike Huckleberry
Party	Republican	Democratic
Popular vote	205,274	110,885
Percentage	64.4%	34.8%
- County results Camp: 50–60% 60–70% 70–80%
U.S. Representative before election
Dave Camp
Republican
Elected U.S. Representative
Dave Camp
Republican

=== Predictions ===
Source	Ranking	As of
The Cook Political Report	Safe R	October 29, 2004
Sabato's Crystal Ball	Safe R	November 1, 2004

Results

Michigan's 4th congressional district election, 2004
Party	Candidate	Votes	%
Republican	Dave Camp	205,274	64.36%
Democratic	Mike Huckleberry	110,885	34.77%
Libertarian	Albert Chia, Jr.	2,765	0.87%
Total votes		318,924	100.00%

== District 5 ==
2004 Michigan's 5th congressional district election
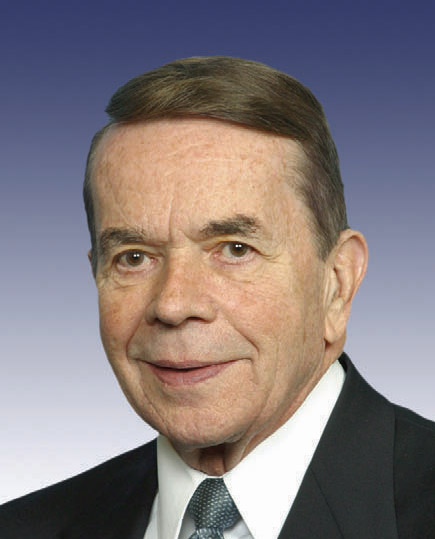

Nominee	Dale E. Kildee	Myrah Kirkwood
Party	Democratic	Republican
Popular vote	208,163	96,934
Percentage	67.2%	31.3%
- County results Kildee: 50–60% 60–70%
U.S. Representative before election
Dale Kildee
Democratic
Elected U.S. Representative
Dale E. Kildee
Democratic

=== Predictions ===
Source	Ranking	As of
The Cook Political Report	Safe D	October 29, 2004
Sabato's Crystal Ball	Safe D	November 1, 2004

Results

Michigan's 5th congressional district election, 2004
Party	Candidate	Votes	%
Democratic	Dale E. Kildee	208,163	67.17%
Republican	Myrah Kirkwood	96,934	31.28%
Green	Harley Mikkelson	2,468	0.80%
Libertarian	Clint Foster	2,350	0.76%
Total votes		309,915	100.00%

== District 6 ==
2004 Michigan's 6th congressional district election
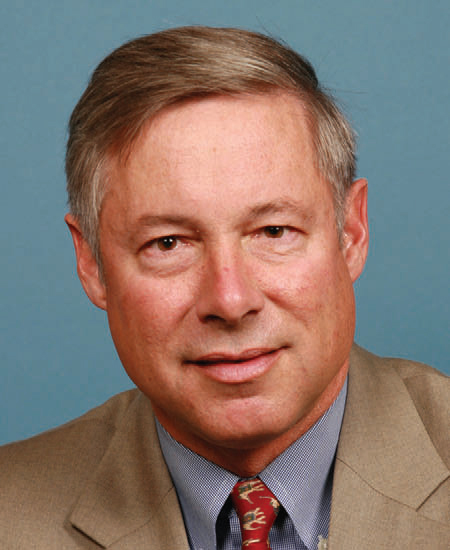

Nominee	Fred Upton	Scott Elliott
Party	Republican	Democratic
Popular vote	197,425	97,978
Percentage	65.3%	32.4%
- County results Upton: 60–70% 70–80%
U.S. Representative before election
Fred Upton
Republican
Elected U.S. Representative
Fred Upton
Republican

=== Predictions ===
Source	Ranking	As of
The Cook Political Report	Safe R	October 29, 2004
Sabato's Crystal Ball	Safe R	November 1, 2004

Results

Michigan's 6th congressional district election, 2004
Party	Candidate	Votes	%
Republican	Fred Upton	197,425	65.34%
Democratic	Scott Elliott	97,978	32.43%
Green	Randall MacPhee	2,311	0.76%
Libertarian	Erwin J. Haas	2,275	0.75%
Constitution	W. Dennis FitzSimons	2,169	0.72%
Total votes		302,158	100.00%

== District 7 ==
2004 Michigan's 7th congressional district election
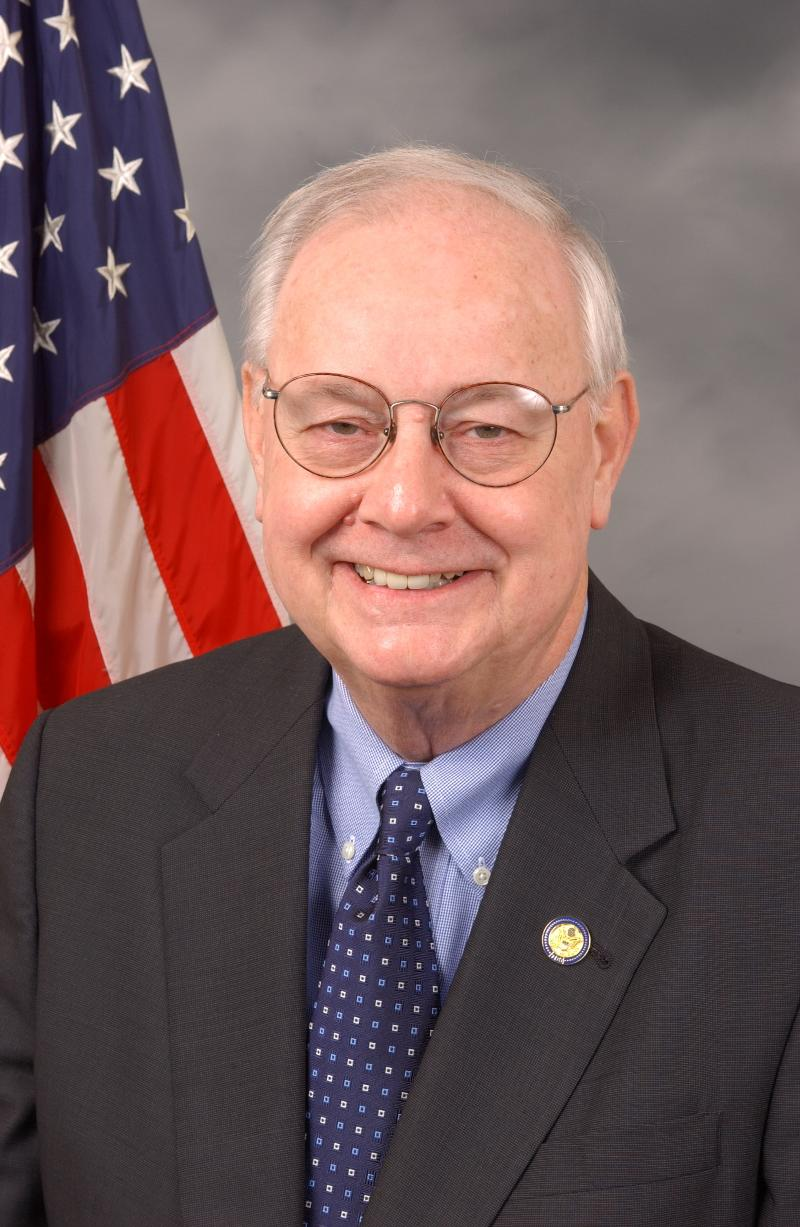

Nominee	Joe Schwarz	Sharon Marie Renier
Party	Republican	Democratic
Popular vote	176,053	109,527
Percentage	58.4%	36.3%
- County results Schwarz: 50–60% 60–70%
U.S. Representative before election
Nick Smith
Republican
Elected U.S. Representative
Joe Schwarz
Republican

=== Predictions ===
Source	Ranking	As of
The Cook Political Report	Safe R	October 29, 2004
Sabato's Crystal Ball	Safe R	November 1, 2004

Results

Michigan's 7th congressional district election, 2004
Party	Candidate	Votes	%
Republican	Joe Schwarz	176,053	58.36%
Democratic	Sharon Marie Renier	109,527	36.31%
Constitution	David Horn	9,032	2.99%
Green	Jason Seagraves	3,996	1.32%
Libertarian	Kenneth Proctor	3,034	1.01%
Total votes		301,642	100.00%

== District 8 ==
2004 Michigan's 8th congressional district election
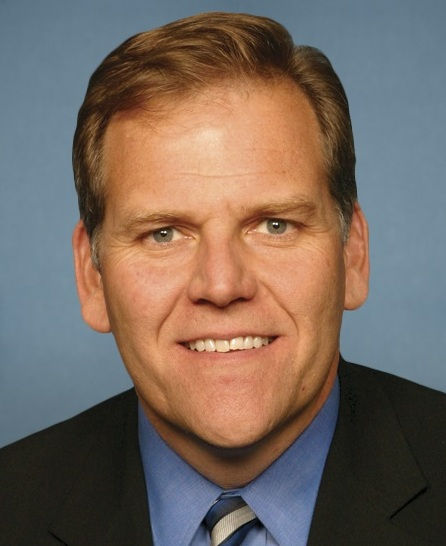

Nominee	Mike Rogers	Robert D. Alexander
Party	Republican	Democratic
Popular vote	207,925	125,619
Percentage	61.0%	36.9%
- County results Rogers: 60–70% 70–80% Alexander: 40–50%
U.S. Representative before election
Mike Rogers
Republican
Elected U.S. Representative
Mike Rogers
Republican

=== Predictions ===
Source	Ranking	As of
The Cook Political Report	Safe R	October 29, 2004
Sabato's Crystal Ball	Safe R	November 1, 2004

Results

Michigan's 8th congressional district election, 2004
Party	Candidate	Votes	%
Republican	Mike Rogers	207,925	61.03%
Democratic	Robert D. Alexander	125,619	36.87%
Libertarian	Will Tyler White	3,591	1.05%
Constitution	John Mangopoulos	3,288	0.97%
Write-in	Write-ins	271	0.08%
Total votes		340,694	100.00%

== District 9 ==
2004 Michigan's 9th congressional district election
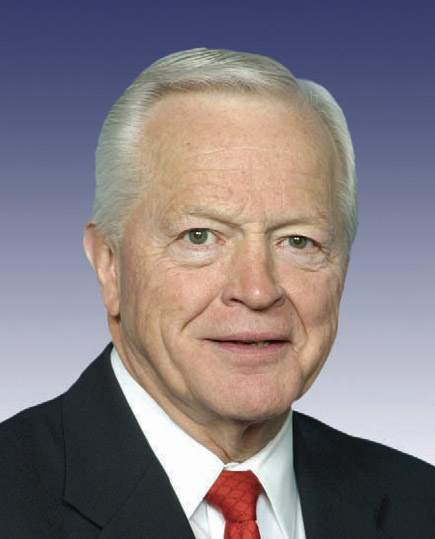

Nominee	Joe Knollenberg	Steven W. Reifman
Party	Republican	Democratic
Popular vote	199,210	134,764
Percentage	58.5%	39.5%
- County results Knollenberg: 50–60%
U.S. Representative before election
Joe Knollenberg
Republican
Elected U.S. Representative
Joe Knollenberg
Republican

=== Predictions ===
Source	Ranking	As of
The Cook Political Report	Safe R	October 29, 2004
Sabato's Crystal Ball	Safe R	November 1, 2004

Results

Michigan's 9th congressional district election, 2004
Party	Candidate	Votes	%
Republican	Joe Knollenberg	199,210	58.45%
Democratic	Steven W. Reifman	134,764	39.54%
Libertarian	Robert W. Schubring	6,825	2.00%
Total votes		340,799	100.00%

== District 10 ==
2004 Michigan's 10th congressional district election
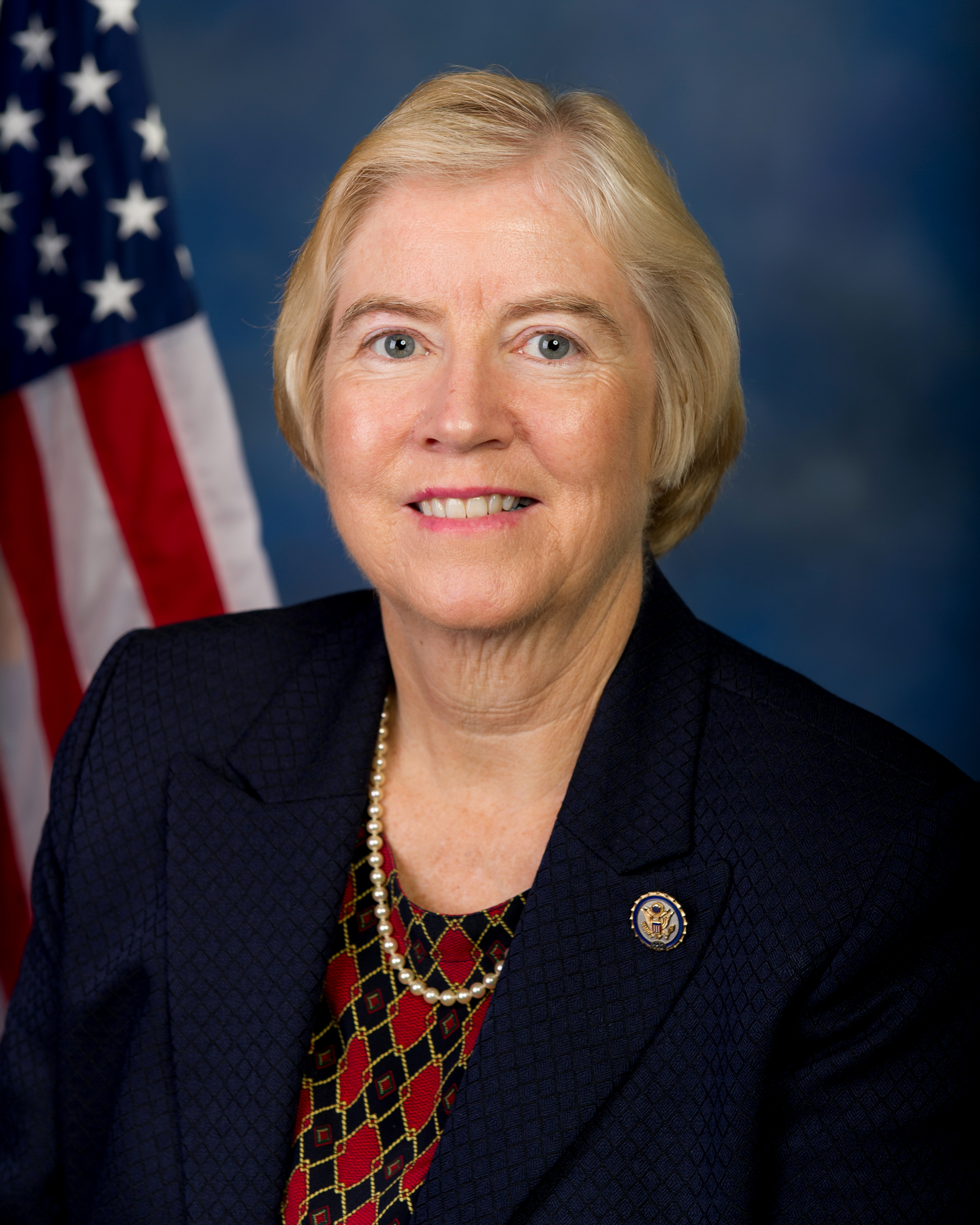

Nominee	Candice S. Miller	Rob Casey
Party	Republican	Democratic
Popular vote	227,720	98,029
Percentage	68.6%	29.5%
- County results Miller: 60–70% 70–80%
U.S. Representative before election
Candice Miller
Republican
Elected U.S. Representative
Candice S. Miller
Republican

=== Predictions ===
Source	Ranking	As of
The Cook Political Report	Safe R	October 29, 2004
Sabato's Crystal Ball	Safe R	November 1, 2004

Results

Michigan's 10th congressional district election, 2004
Party	Candidate	Votes	%
Republican	Candice S. Miller	227,720	68.62%
Democratic	Rob Casey	98,029	29.54%
Libertarian	Phoebe A. Basso	3,966	1.20%
Natural Law	Anthony America	2,153	0.65%
Total votes		331,868	100.00%

== District 11 ==
2004 Michigan's 11th congressional district election
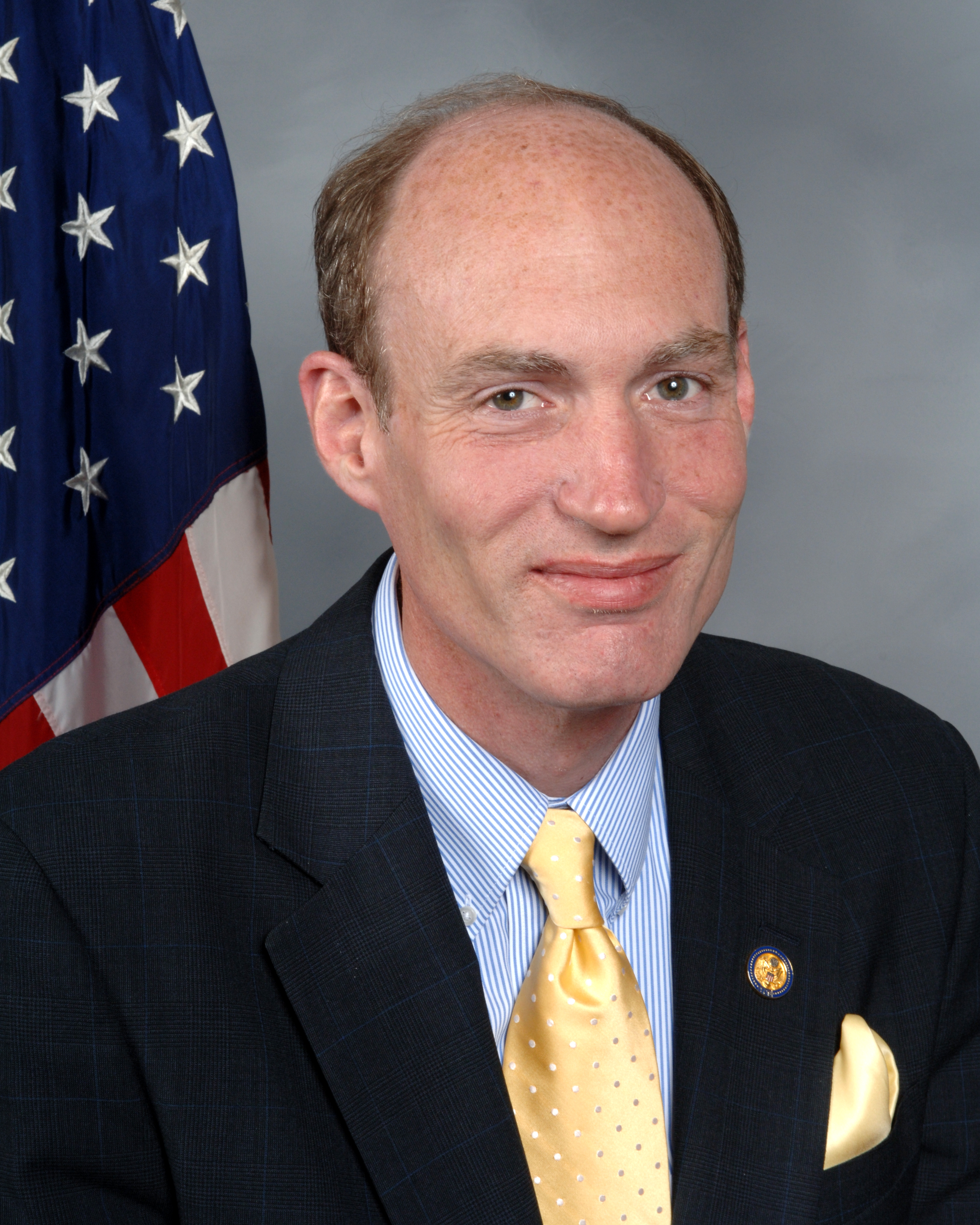

Nominee	Thaddeus G. McCotter	Phillip S. Truran
Party	Republican	Democratic
Popular vote	186,431	134,301
Percentage	57.0%	41.0%
- County results Mccotter: 50–60% 60–70%
U.S. Representative before election
Thad McCotter
Republican
Elected U.S. Representative
Thaddeus G. McCotter
Republican

=== Predictions ===
Source	Ranking	As of
The Cook Political Report	Safe R	October 29, 2004
Sabato's Crystal Ball	Safe R	November 1, 2004

Results

Michigan's 11th congressional district election, 2004
Party	Candidate	Votes	%
Republican	Thaddeus G. McCotter	186,431	56.97%
Democratic	Phillip S. Truran	134,301	41.04%
Libertarian	Charles L. Basso, Jr.	6,484	1.98%
Total votes		327,216	100.00%

== District 12 ==
2004 Michigan's 12th congressional district election
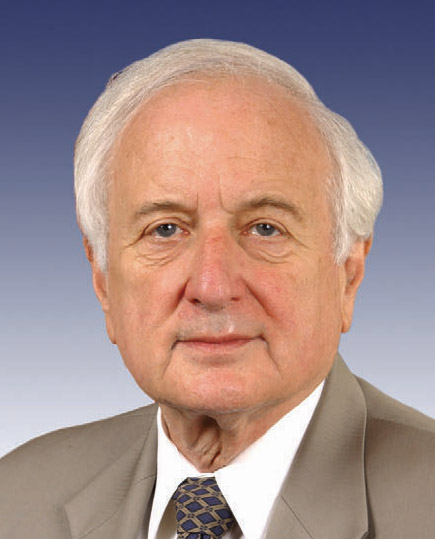

Nominee	Sander M. Levin	Randell J. Shafer
Party	Democratic	Republican
Popular vote	210,827	88,256
Percentage	69.3%	29.0%
- County results Levin: 60–70% 80–90%
U.S. Representative before election
Sander Levin
Democratic
Elected U.S. Representative
Sander M. Levin
Democratic

=== Predictions ===
Source	Ranking	As of
The Cook Political Report	Safe D	October 29, 2004
Sabato's Crystal Ball	Safe D	November 1, 2004

Results

Michigan's 12th congressional district election, 2004
Party	Candidate	Votes	%
Democratic	Sander M. Levin	210,827	69.32%
Republican	Randell J. Shafer	88,256	29.02%
Libertarian	Dick Gach	5,051	1.66%
Total votes		304,134	100.00%

== District 13 ==
2004 Michigan's 13th congressional district election
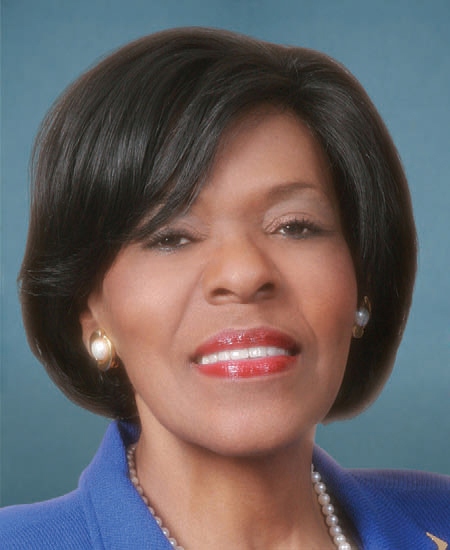

Nominee	Carolyn C. Kilpatrick	Cynthia Cassell
Party	Democratic	Republican
Popular vote	173,246	40,935
Percentage	78.2%	18.5%
- County results Kilpatrick: 70–80%
U.S. Representative before election
Carolyn Cheeks Kilpatrick
Democratic
Elected U.S. Representative
Carolyn C. Kilpatrick
Democratic

=== Predictions ===
Source	Ranking	As of
The Cook Political Report	Safe D	October 29, 2004
Sabato's Crystal Ball	Safe D	November 1, 2004

Results

Michigan's 13th congressional district election, 2004
Party	Candidate	Votes	%
Democratic	Carolyn C. Kilpatrick	173,246	78.16%
Republican	Cynthia Cassell	40,935	18.47%
Green	Thomas Lavigne	4,261	1.92%
Libertarian	Eric Gordon	3,211	1.45%
Write-in	Write-ins	1	0.00%
Total votes		221,654	100.00%

== District 14 ==
2004 Michigan's 14th congressional district election

Nominee	John Conyers	Veronica Pedraza
Party	Democratic	Republican
Popular vote	213,681	35,089
Percentage	83.9%	13.8%
- County results Conyers: 80–90%
U.S. Representative before election
John Conyers
Democratic
Elected U.S. Representative
John Conyers
Democratic

=== Predictions ===
Source	Ranking	As of
The Cook Political Report	Safe D	October 29, 2004
Sabato's Crystal Ball	Safe D	November 1, 2004

Results

Michigan's 14th congressional district election, 2004
Party	Candidate	Votes	%
Democratic	John Conyers	213,681	83.93%
Republican	Veronica Pedraza	35,089	13.78%
Libertarian	Michael Donahue	2,278	0.89%
Green	Lisa Weltman	2,224	0.87%
Constitution	Wilbert Sears	1,307	0.51%
Write-in	Write-ins	1	0.00%
Total votes		254,580	100.00%

== District 15 ==
2004 Michigan's 15th congressional district election
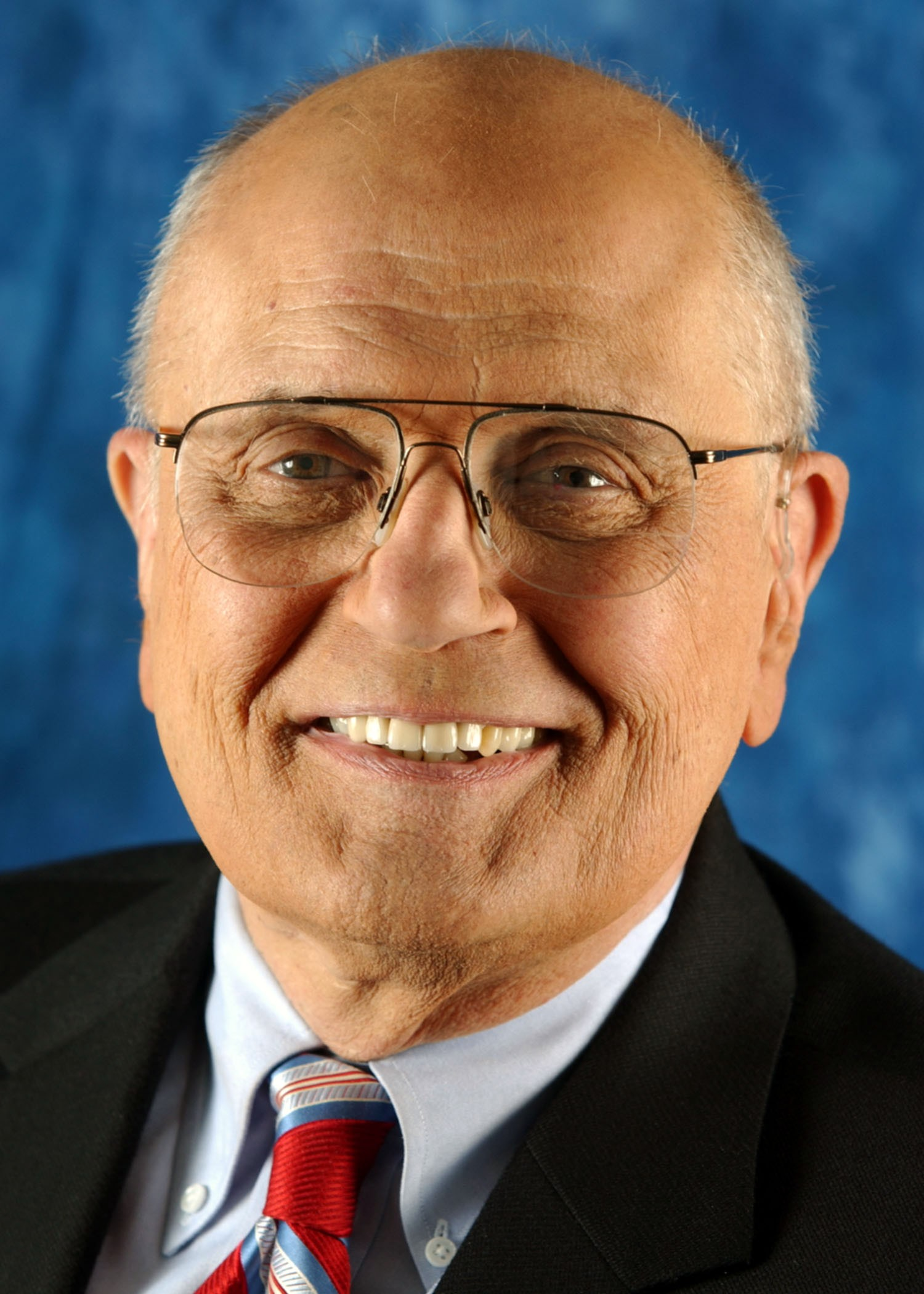

Nominee	John D. Dingell	Dawn Anne Reamer
Party	Democratic	Republican
Popular vote	218,409	81,828
Percentage	70.9%	26.6%
- County results Dingell: 60–70% 70–80%
U.S. Representative before election
John Dingell
Democratic
Elected U.S. Representative
John D. Dingell
Democratic

=== Predictions ===
Source	Ranking	As of
The Cook Political Report	Safe D	October 29, 2004
Sabato's Crystal Ball	Safe D	November 1, 2004

Results

Michigan's 15th congressional district election, 2004
Party	Candidate	Votes	%
Democratic	John D. Dingell	218,409	70.92%
Republican	Dawn Anne Reamer	81,828	26.57%
Libertarian	Gregory Scott Stempfle	3,400	1.10%
Constitution	Mike Eller	2,508	0.81%
Independent	Jerome S. White	1,818	0.59%
Total votes		307,963	100.00%
