= Rick Outman =

American politician (born 1963)

Member of the Michigan Senate from the 33rd district
- Incumbent
- Assumed office January 1, 2019
- Preceded by: Judy Emmons

Member of the Michigan House of Representatives from the 70th district
- In office January 1, 2011 – January 1, 2017
- Preceded by: Mike Huckleberry
- Succeeded by: Jim Lower

Personal details
- Born: December 15, 1963 (age 62) Lakeview, Michigan
- Party: Republican
- Relatives: Pat Outman (son)

Rick Outman (born December 15, 1963) is a Republican politician from the U.S. state of Michigan. Since 2019, he has been a member of the Michigan Senate, elected from the 33rd Senate district. He was a member of the Michigan House of Representatives, representing the 70th district, from 2011 to 2017. He was term limited out in 2017.

== Early life, education, and business career ==
Outman was born on December 15, 1963, in Lakeview, Michigan. He grew up in Montcalm County, Michigan. He received a bachelor's degree from Grand Valley State University. He is the owner and operator of Outman Excavating, a third-generation family business. He formerly was a member of the U.S. Army and Army National Guard, and a substitute teacher.

== Political career ==
=== State House ===
Outman unsuccessfully sought the Republican nomination for Michigan House of Representatives in the 70th district in 2008. He was defeated in the primary election, coming in fourth place among six candidates. Thomas A. Ginster won the Republican nomination, and was in turn defeated in the November 2008 general election by Mike Huckleberry, the first Democrat to hold the seat since 1932. Outman ran again in 2010 and defeated Huckleberry. Outman was elected to two additional terms in the state House, in 2012 and 2014. His campaign manager in 2012 and 2014 was James Lower, who in 2016 was elected to the state House from the 70th district, after Outman was term-limited out.

In 2012, Outman voted in favor of a "right-to-work law" that barred labor unions from collecting fees from workers represented under collective bargaining agreements. In 2013, he voted against Medicaid expansion bill, which passed on a 76–31 vote (original version) and then a 75–32 vote (final version). Medicaid expansion was supported by almost every Democrat, but Republican members were split, with a little more than half voting no and the rest voting yes. In 2014, Outman voted against a compromise bill to increase Michigan's minimum wage to $9.25 an hour by 2018. The bill passed the House on a 76–34 vote and the Senate on a 24–12 vote, and was signed into law by Governor Rick Snyder.

=== State Senate ===
He was ineligible to run for reelection to the House in 2016 due to term limits, and was hired as a legislative staffer (district liaison) by Republican state Senator Judy Emmons at the end of 2016. Emmons was ineligible to run for reelection to the Senate due to term limits. In 2018, Outman won election to fill her state Senate seat. The district is solidly Republican; Outman won the August 2018 Republican primary election with 72 percent of the vote, and won the 2018 general election by a margin of about 20 percentage points. He took office in 2019. Outman then hired Emmons to be his district liaison.

Outman cosponsored, with Senator Marshall Bullock, bipartisan legislation to ban minors from using electronic cigarettes (vaping).

During the COVID-19 pandemic in Michigan, Outman criticized Governor Gretchen Whitmer for coronavirus restrictions.

In the 2020 presidential election, Joe Biden defeated Donald Trump; Biden won by three percentage points in Michigan. Trump subsequently launched an effort to overturn the election result and remain in power. In January 2021, Outman was one of 11 Republican Michigan state senators who promoted Trump's false claims of fraud in the 2020 election; in a letter sent to Congress on January 6, 2021, ahead of the formal counting of the electoral votes, Outman and the other members of the group baselessly suggested that there were "credible allegations of election-related concerns surrounding fraud and irregularities."

As of 2022, Outman was chair of the Department of Health and Human Services sub-committee budget and the Environmental Quality Committee.

Outman's 33rd state Senate district originally encompassed Montcalm, Clare, Gratiot, Isabella, and Mecosta counties. In the 2020 redistricting cycle, the district was redrawn to cover seven counties in West Michigan: all of Montcalm and Newaygo counties and portions of Kent, Ionia, Lake, Muskegon, and Ottawa counties. Outman is seeking reelection in 2022 in the new district. During his campaign, he accused Whitmer of attempting "to centrally plan our society."

== Personal life ==
Outman lives in Six Lakes, Michigan. He is married and has three children. His son Pat Outman has been a member of the Michigan House since 2021, filling his father's old seat.
