= Pat Outman =

American politician

Member of the Michigan House of Representatives
- Incumbent
- Assumed office January 1, 2021
- Preceded by: Jim Lower
- Constituency: 70th district (2021–2022); 91st district (2023–present)

Personal details
- Born: Patrick Outman c. 1992 (age 33–34) Six Lakes, Michigan
- Party: Republican
- Relations: Rick Outman (father)
- Education: Ferris State University
- Website: Pat Outman

Patrick Outman (born c. 1992) is an American politician from Michigan. A member of the Republican, he is a member of the Michigan House of Representatives from the 91st district. First elected in 2020, he the state House on January 1, 2021.

== Early life, education, and career ==
Pat Outman was born around 1992 in Six Lakes, Michigan to father Rick Outman. In 2010, Pat graduated from Lakeview High School. Pat later earned a degree in business administration and legal studies from Ferris State University, where he graduated with honors. Outman worked for his family's excavating business and cattle farm.

== Political career ==
Before being elected to the Michigan House of Representatives, Outman was a staffer in the state legislature. He was elected to the state House as a Republican from 70th district in November 2020. He took office in January 2021. He replaced outgoing state Representative Jim Lower, and fills the seat formerly occupied by his father. At the time, the district covered all of Montcalm County and parts of Gratiot County.

In February 2021, Outman introduced a bill seeks to allow winners of multi-state lotteries to collect their winnings while staying anonymous.

In 2021, Outman was one of four representatives (all Republicans) to vote against HB 4856, which would allow government agencies to exempt from disclosure under the state Freedom of Information the names of victims of sexual misconduct who sue as anonymous plaintiffs. The legislation was one piece of a bipartisan package brought after the Larry Nasser scandal.

In 2021, Outman was one of eight Republican legislators to co-sponsor the "Fact Checker Registration Act" a bill that would require fact-checking organizations to register with the government and file proof of a $1 million fidelity bond. The bill was introduced by Republican Representative Matt Maddock, a prominent 2020 presidential election denier. The Michigan Press Association said that the bill infringed on the First Amendment freedom of the press, and Lasinski said it aimed to "intimidate and harass" journalists. In 2022, Outman was one of 17 Michigan Republican legislators who signed a letter urging the state attorney general to investigate debunked claims of "election fraud" in the 2020 election based on 2000 Mules, a debunked film pushed by Donald Trump and other election deniers.

In 2021, Outman was one of three House representatives who voted against a bipartisan ethics package that established a specific conflict of interest policy for the Michigan Legislature. The bill (HB 4011) prohibits state legislators from voting on bills that could personally benefit them, their families, or businesses. The bill passed the House on a 105–3 vote; the other "no" votes came from Republicans Beau LaFave and Steve Carra.

In 2022, Outman sponsored a nonbinding resolution, HB 210, that accused Michigan public schools of harboring "radical politics" and engaging in "political indoctrination." He offered no evidence for these claims. The resolution also criticized Democratic Governor Gretchen Whitmer for vetoing a bill to create a school voucher-type program for private school tuition. The resolution was approved by the state House Education Committee on a party-line vote.

In the 2022 election, redistricting put Outman in the 91st district. The new district covers northeastern Kent County; parts of northern Kent County (including Cedar Springs); and portions of Montcalm and Ionia counties, including Greenville and Belding. He defeated Democratic nominee Tammy L. DeVries with 68.2% of the vote.

Control of both chambers of the Michigan Legislature flipped in the 2022 election, with Democrats winning the majority in the new legislative session that began in 2023. Outman and his father (a state senator) opposed the labor-rights package of bills signed into law by Governor Gretchen Whitmer in March 2023; the legislation, which passed the House and Senate on party-line votes, repealed the "right-to-work law" enacted in 2012 under Governor Rick Snyder and reinstated the prevailing wage law.

He was reelected to the state House in 2024.

== Personal life ==
Outman is a member of the National Rifle Association of America.
