= Michigan's 70th House of Representatives district =

American legislative district

Michigan's 70th State House of Representatives district
Representative
Cynthia Neeley; D–Flint
- Demographics: 37% White; 51.4% Black; 5% Hispanic; 0.7% Asian; 0.4% Native American; 0.6% Other; 5% Multiracial
- Population (2024): 90,411

Michigan's 70th House of Representatives district (also referred to as Michigan's 70th House district) is a legislative district within the Michigan House of Representatives located in part of Genesee County. The district was created in 1965, when the Michigan House of Representatives district naming scheme changed from a county-based system to a numerical one.

== List of representatives ==
Representative	Party	Dates	Residence	Notes
John T. Kelsey	Democratic	1965–1982	Warren	
Lloyd F. Weeks	Democratic	1983–1992	Warren	
H. Lynn Jondahl	Democratic	1993–1994	Okemos	
Laura Baird	Democratic	1995–2000	Okemos	
Gretchen Whitmer	Democratic	2001–2002	East Lansing	
Judy Emmons	Republican	2003–2008	Sheridan	
Mike Huckleberry	Democratic	2009–2010	Greenville	
Rick Outman	Republican	2011–2016	Six Lakes	
Jim Lower	Republican	2017–2020	Cedar Lake	
Pat Outman	Republican	2021–2022	Six Lakes	
Cynthia Neeley	Democratic	2023–present	Flint	

== Recent elections ==
=== 2020s ===
2026 Michigan House of Representatives election
Party	Candidate	Votes	%
Democratic	Cynthia R. Neeley (incumbent)	23,133	81.8
Republican	Larry Hutchinson	5,147	18.2
Total votes		28,280	100
Democratic hold			

2018 Michigan House of Representatives election
Party	Candidate	Votes	%
Republican	James Lower	17,870	61.62
Democratic	Kresta Train	11,130	38.38
Total votes		29,000	100
Republican hold			

2016 Michigan House of Representatives election
Party	Candidate	Votes	%
Republican	James Lower	21,001	63.24%
Democratic	Ken Hart	10,625	31.99%
Green	Michael Anderson	1,584	4.77%
Total votes		33,210	100.00%
Republican hold			

2014 Michigan House of Representatives election
Party	Candidate	Votes	%
Republican	Rick Outman	13,372	61.75
Democratic	James Hoisington	8,282	38.25
Total votes		21,654	100.0
Republican hold			

2012 Michigan House of Representatives election
Party	Candidate	Votes	%
Republican	Rick Outman	17,709	54.46
Democratic	Mike Huckleberry	14,809	45.54
Total votes		32,518	100.0
Republican hold			

2010 Michigan House of Representatives election
Party	Candidate	Votes	%
Republican	Rick Outman	13,324	54.7
Democratic	Mike Huckleberry	10,487	43.05
Libertarian	Patty Hone	548	2.25
Total votes		24,359	100.0
Republican gain from Democratic			

2008 Michigan House of Representatives election
Party	Candidate	Votes	%
Democratic	Mike Huckleberry	21,212	54.35
Republican	Thomas Ginster	17,814	45.65
Total votes		39,026	100.0
Democratic gain from Republican			

== Historical district boundaries ==
Map	Description	Apportionment Plan	Notes
	Macomb County (part): Warren (part)	1964 Apportionment Plan	
	Macomb County (part): Center Line; Warren (part)	1972 Apportionment Plan	
	Macomb County (part): Center Line; Warren (part)	1982 Apportionment Plan	
	Ingham County (part): East Lansing; Meridian Township (part)	1992 Apportionment Plan	
	Ionia County (part): Belding; Berlin Township (part); Easton Township; Ionia (part); Ionia Township (part); Keene Township; Orleans Township; Otisco Township; Montcalm County	2001 Apportionment Plan	
	Gratiot County (part): Alma; Arcada Township (part); Bethany Township; Emerson Township (part); Pine River Township; St. Louis; Seville Township; Montcalm County	2011 Apportionment Plan	
