= Mike Huckleberry =

American politician

Member of the Michigan House of Representatives from the 70th district
- In office 2009–2010
- Preceded by: Judy Emmons
- Succeeded by: Rick Outman

Personal details
- Born: July 12, 1948 (age 78) Cedar Springs, Michigan
- Party: Democratic
- Spouse: Linda Huckleberry
- Children: 1
- Profession: Restaurateur

Michael "Huck" Huckleberry (born July 12, 1948) is a politician, restaurateur, and small business owner from Greenville, Michigan. In 2008, he was elected as a Democrat to the Michigan State House of Representatives. He represented the 70th House District, which includes all of Montcalm County and a portion of North-west Ionia County including the city of Ionia. In 2006 he unsuccessfully challenged incumbent Republican Congressman Dave Camp, who represents Michigan's 4th congressional district, located in central Michigan. In 2010 he was defeated by Rick Outman, 55%-43%.

== Biography ==
Mike Huckleberry was born on July 12, 1948, in Cedar Springs, Michigan. He graduated from Cedar Springs High School in 1966. From 1967 to 1968, Huckleberry attended Grand Rapids Community College. In 1969, he attended Davenport University, located in Michigan], in business studies. He has owned and operated Huckleberry's Restaurant in Greenville, Michigan since 1991. He is married to Linda Huckleberry and they have five children and three grandchildren.

== Political career ==
Huckleberry served on the Greenville Task Force to save the Electrolux refrigerator plant, as well as on the Greenville Chamber Board of Directors (unfortunately, the owners of Electrolux ultimately decided to move the plant to Mexico). He was elected as president of the Cedar Springs Chamber of Commerce twice. He has previously served as Chair of the Montcalm County Democratic Party. In 2006, Mike Huckleberry unsuccessfully challenged Republican Congressman Dave Camp for his seat in Congress. Camp represents the 4th Congressional District, located in the Central Lower Peninsula. He lost to Camp by a margin of 60%-38%.

In 2008, Huckleberry ran for the 70th State House District of Michigan. The seat was vacated by Republican Judy Emmons, who retired due to term limits, which prevent a member for serving longer than three terms. Huckleberry was unopposed in the Democratic Primary and faced Republican Thomas Ginster in the general election. He defeated Ginster by a 54%-46% margin. Huckleberry went on to lose his bid for reelection to that seat in 2010, and his bid to regain the seat in 2012. His opponent in both the 2010 and 2012 elections was Republican Rick Outman.

== Electoral history ==
- 2012 election for State House
  - Rick Outman (R), 54%
  - Mike Huckleberry (D), 46%
- 2010 election for State House
  - Rick Outman (R), 55%
  - Mike Huckleberry (D), 43%
- 2008 election for State House
  - Mike Huckleberry (D), 54%
  - Tom Ginster (R), 46%
- 2006 election for U.S. Congress
  - Dave Camp (R), 60%
  - Mike Huckleberry (D), 38%
