= Judy Emmons =

American politician

Member of the Michigan Senate from the 33rd district
- In office January 1, 2011 – January 1, 2019
- Preceded by: Alan Cropsey
- Succeeded by: Rick Outman

Member of the Michigan House of Representatives from the 70th district
- In office January 1, 2003 – January 1, 2009
- Preceded by: Gretchen Whitmer
- Succeeded by: Mike Huckleberry

Personal details
- Party: Republican
- Spouse: Jerry Emmons

Judy K. Emmons is a former Michigan state senator who represented District 33. She is the former chair of the Families, Seniors and Human Services Committee, and former vice-chair of Education.

== Michigan House of Representatives ==
Emmons' first campaign for the Michigan House of Representatives occurred in 2002, running the 70th District. Incumbent state Rep. Gretchen Whitmer chose to run for re-election in the 69th District rather than the 70th after her district was redrawn following the 2000 Census. Emmons ran in the Republican primary against Jon Aylsworth, who has served on the Greenville City Council. Emmons won the GOP nomination by taking nearly 63 percent of more than 6,700 votes. In the general election, she defeated Democratic nominee Henry Sanchez, taking nearly 66 percent of more than 22,000 votes. She would not face any Republican opposition for the GOP nomination in the 70th District in her two re-election campaigns, running unopposed in 2004 and 2006. In the 2004 general election she faced a re-match with Sanchez, winning re-election by again taking nearly 66 percent of more than 34,000 votes. She defeated 21-year-old Christopher Mahar by taking nearly 64 percent of almost 30,000 votes.

She was not eligible to run for a fourth term as the Michigan Constitution limits state Representatives to three terms.

== Michigan Senate ==
After Rick Snyder won the GOP nomination for governor in August 2010, he stunned political observes by picking then-state Rep. Brian Calley as his choice to be the GOP nominee for lieutenant governor on August 25, 2010.

Just weeks earlier, Calley had won the GOP nomination for the 33rd state Senate district. On September 3, 2010, Emmons was chosen as Calley's replacement by the 33rd District Republican Party Executive Committee, covering Clinton, Ionia, Isabella and Montcalm counties. The committee selected Emmons over Scott Hummel in an 82–37 vote. In the November general election, Emmons defeated Democratic nominee James Hoisington, capturing almost 65 percent of almost 78,000 votes.

Emmons officially filed for a second term on April 17, 2014. She won re-nomination uncontested in August 2014.

On November 4, 2014, Emmons won re-election to the state Senate defeating former educator and counselor Fred Sprague, taking 57 percent of the vote.

Emmons is prohibited from seeking re-election to the state Senate, as the state Constitution limits Senators to be elected to a maximum of two, four-year terms.

== Electoral history ==
2002 Republican Primary - Michigan's 70th state House District
Party	Candidate	Votes	%	±%
Republican	Judy Emmons	4,258	62.8	N/A
Republican	Jon Aylsworth	2,519	37.2	N/A

2002 General Election - Michigan's 70th state House District
Party	Candidate	Votes	%	±%
Republican	Judy Emmons	14,610	65.8	+22.2
Democratic	Henry Sanchez	7,588	34.2	−22.2

2004 General Election - Michigan's 70th state House District
Party	Candidate	Votes	%	±%
Republican	Judy Emmons (I)	22,744	66.0	+0.2
Democratic	Henry Sanchez	11,732	34.2	−0.2

2006 General Election - Michigan's 70th state House District
Party	Candidate	Votes	%	±%
Republican	Judy Emmons (I)	18,392	63.2	−2.8
Democratic	Christopher Mahar	10,704	36.8	+2.8

2010 General Election - Michigan's 33rd state Senate District
Party	Candidate	Votes	%	±%
Republican	Judy Emmons	50,222	64.5	+10.7
Democratic	James Hoisington	25,206	32.4	−11.7
Libertarian	Joshua Lillie	2,403	3.1	+1.0

2014 General Election - Michigan's 33rd state Senate District
Party	Candidate	Votes	%	±%
Republican	Judy Emmons (I)	36,420	57.2	−7.3
Democratic	Fred Sprague	27,235	42.8	+10.4
