= Jim Lower =

American politician

James Lower

Member of the Michigan House of Representatives from the 70th district
- In office January 1, 2017 – January 1, 2021
- Preceded by: Rick Outman
- Succeeded by: Pat Outman

Personal details
- Born: April 10, 1989 (age 37) Ionia, Michigan
- Party: Republican
- Spouse: Kristen
- Children: Aaron and Kate
- Education: Michigan State University (BS); Grand Valley State University (MBA)
- Website: State Rep. James Lower and Campaign website

James Lower (born April 10, 1989) is an American politician who has served as a Republican member of the Michigan House of Representatives representing the 70th district since 2017. Lower previously served on the Ionia County Board of Commissioners, was the Village Manager of Edmore, Michigan, and was the campaign manager for Brian Calley's state senate campaign in 2010.

== Elected office and political career ==
Lower was elected to the Ionia County Board of Commissioners in 2010, becoming one of the youngest elected officials in Michigan and the board's youngest member as a 21-year-old. In 2012, Lower ran an unsuccessful campaign for Ionia County Clerk. In 2014, Lower accepted a job as the Edmore Village Manager, earning an annual salary of $45,000. He resigned from this job after 18 months when he announced his candidacy for the Michigan House of Representatives.

Michigan state representative Rick Outman was term limited out of the 70th District House seat in 2016. Lower announced his candidacy for the seat in January 2016 and won the 2016 election with 63% of the vote, beating Democratic Party candidate Ken Hart and Green Party candidate Michael Anderson.

In December 2018, Lower sponsored a bill during the lame-duck session which would make it harder to get signatures for ballot initiatives. The Detroit Free Press noted that the bill came "on the heels of three successful ballot proposals that were overwhelmingly approved by voters... but were opposed by many Republicans." The bill would require that a ballot initiative cannot get more than 15 percent of total signatures from any one of Michigan's 14 districts. Lower said that the intention behind the bill was to "get more transparency in the process and more input from voters."

During 2019-2020 legislative session, Lower sponsored 15 bills of which only three became law. Lower was the only sponsor of a bill which eased restrictions on sex offenders, eliminating the requirement that they appear in person to update information and eliminating school safety zones which had previously prohibited sex offenders from living within 1,000 feet of a school.

Lower lives in Greenville, Michigan with his wife Kristen and two young children.

In May 2019, Lower announced that he was challenging independent U.S. Representative Justin Amash for Michigan's 3rd congressional district in the 2020 election. He withdrew from the race in November 2019. On December 7, 2020, speaker-designate Jason Wentworth announced that he had hired Lower to be a strategic advisor on his staff beginning in January 2021.

During the 2020 elections, Mr. Lower drew criticism that he was accepting unlawful payments through a shell company "Eureka RDC" in exchange for his endorsement.
