= Michigan's 36th Senate district =

American legislative district

Michigan's 36th State Senate district
Senator
| Michele Hoitenga; R–Manton |
- Demographics: 92.2% White; 0.7% Black; 2.3% Hispanic; 0.5% Asian; 0.2% Native American; 0.2% Other; 3.9% Multiracial
- Population (2024): 274,056

Michigan's 36th Senate district is one of 38 districts in the Michigan Senate. The 36th district was created with the adoption of the 1963 Michigan Constitution, as the previous 1908 state constitution only permitted 34 senatorial districts. It has been represented by Republican Michele Hoitenga since 2023, succeeding fellow Republican Jim Stamas.

== Geography ==
District 36 encompasses the entirety of Alcona, Alpena, Arenac, Crawford, Iosco, Kalkaska, Missaukee, Montmorency, Ogemaw, Oscoda, Otsego, Presque Isle, Roscommon, and Wexford counties, as well as parts of Bay and Manistee counties.

=== 2011 Apportionment Plan ===
District 36, as dictated by the 2011 Apportionment Plan, stretched from Midland to the northern end of the Lower Peninsula, where it covered all of Alcona, Alpena, Arenac, Gladwin, Iosco, Midland, Montmorency, Oscoda, Otsego, and Presque Isle Counties. Other communities in the district included Alpena, Gladwin, Standish, Tawas City, East Tawas, Harrisville, Mio, Lewiston, Gaylord, Rogers City, and Alpena Township.

The district overlapped with Michigan's 1st, 4th, and 5th congressional districts, and with the 97th, 98th, 99th, 105th, and 106th districts of the Michigan House of Representatives. Most of the district lied along Lake Huron and Saginaw Bay.

== List of senators ==
| Senator | Party | Dates | Residence | Notes |
|---|---|---|---|---|
| Guy Vander Jagt | Republican | 1965–1966 | Cadillac | Resigned. |
| John Toepp | Republican | 1967–1978 | Cadillac | |
| John Engler | Republican | 1979–1982 | Mount Pleasant | |
| Connie Binsfeld | Republican | 1983–1990 | Maple City | |
| John Pridnia | Republican | 1991–1994 | Hubbard Lake | |
| George A. McManus Jr. | Republican | 1995–2002 | Traverse City | |
| Tony Stamas | Republican | 2003–2010 | Midland | |
| John Moolenaar | Republican | 2011–2014 | Midland | |
| Jim Stamas | Republican | 2015–2022 | Midland | |
| Michele Hoitenga | Republican | 2023–present | Manton | |

== Recent election results ==
=== 2020s ===
2026 Michigan Senate election
Primary election
| Party | Candidate | Votes | % |
General election
| Republican | Michele Hoitenga (incumbent) | 89,679 | 66.07 |
| Democratic | Mark W. Yonkman | 46,047 | 33.93 |
| Total votes | | 135,726 | 100 |
| Republican hold | | | |

2022 Michigan Senate election, District 36
| Party | Candidate | Votes | % |
|---|---|---|---|
| Republican | Michele Hoitenga | 87,453 | 66.3 |
| Democratic | Joel A. Sheltrown | 44,529 | 33.7 |
| Total votes | | 131,982 | 100 |
| Republican hold | | | |

=== 2018 ===
2018 Michigan Senate election, District 36
| Party | Candidate | Votes | % |
|---|---|---|---|
| Republican | Jim Stamas (incumbent) | 71,013 | 64.3 |
| Democratic | Joe Weir | 39,440 | 35.7 |
| Total votes | | 110,453 | 100 |
| Republican hold | | | |

=== 2014 ===
2014 Michigan Senate election, District 36
| Party | Candidate | Votes | % |
|---|---|---|---|
| Republican | Jim Stamas | 51,849 | 61.3 |
| Democratic | Joe Lucasiewicz | 32,788 | 38.7 |
| Total votes | | 84,637 | 100 |
| Republican hold | | | |

=== Federal and statewide results ===
| Year | Office | Results |
|---|---|---|
| 2020 | President | Trump 62.8 – 35.6% |
| 2018 | Senate | James 58.7 – 39.3% |
| 2018 | Governor | Schuette 57.2 – 39.7% |
| 2016 | President | Trump 61.9 – 32.7% |
| 2014 | Senate | Land 48.7 – 47.0% |
| 2014 | Governor | Snyder 56.1 – 40.9% |
| 2012 | President | Romney 55.4 – 43.5% |
| 2012 | Senate | Stabenow 52.1 – 44.5% |

== Historical district boundaries ==
| Map | Description | Apportionment Plan | Notes |
|---|---|---|---|
| | Antrim County (part); Custer Township; Elk Rapids Township; Helena Township; Milton Township; Benzie County; Clare County; Crawford County; Grand Traverse County; Isabella County; Kalkaska County; Leelanau County; Manistee County (part); Arcadia Township; Bear Lake Township; Brown Township; Cleon Township; Dickson Township; Maple Grove Township; Marilla Township; Norman Township; Onekama Township; Pleasanton Township; Springdale Township; Stronach Township; Mecosta County; Missaukee County; Newaygo County (part); Ashland Township; Barton Township; Beaver Township; Big Prairie Township; Bridgeton Township; Brooks Township; Dayton Township; Denver Township; Everett Township; Fremont; Garfield Township; Goodwell Township; Grant Township; Home Township; Lilley Township; Lincoln Township; Merrill Township; Monroe Township; Norwich Township; Sheridan Township; Sherman Township; Troy Township; White Cloud; Wilcox Township; Osceola County; Roscommon County; Wexford County | 1964 Apportionment Plan | |
| | Antrim County (part); Custer Township; Benzie County; Clare County; Grand Traverse County; Isabella County; Kalkaska County (part); Excluding; Bear Lake Township; Garfield Township; Lake County (part); Chase Township; Leelanau County; Mecosta County; Missaukee County; Montcalm County (part); Belvidere Township; Cato Township; Day Township; Douglass Township; Evergreen Township; Home Township; Maple Valley Township; Montcalm Township (part); Pierson Township; Pine Township; Reynolds Township; Richland Township; Sidney Township (part); Stanton; Winfield Township; Newaygo County (part); Ashland Township; Barton Township; Bridgeton Township; Brooks Township; Croton Township; Ensley Township; Fremont; Garfield Township; Grant Township; Home Township; Newaygo; Sheridan Township; Osceola County; Wexford County | 1972 Apportionment Plan | |
| | Alcona County; Alpena County; Benzie County; Crawford County; Iosco County; Kalkaska County; Lake County; Leelanau County; Manistee County; Missaukee County; Montmorency County; Ogemaw County; Oscoda County; Presque Isle County; Roscommon County; Wexford County | 1982 Apportionment Plan | |
| | Antrim County; Benzie County; Crawford County; Grand Traverse County; Kalkaska County; Leelanau County; Manistee County; Missaukee County; Otsego County; Roscommon County; Wexford County | 1992 Apportionment Plan | |
| | Alcona County; Alpena County; Crawford County; Gladwin County; Iosco County; Midland County; Montmorency County; Ogemaw County; Oscoda County; Otsego County | 2001 Apportionment Plan | |
| | Alcona County; Alpena County; Arenac County; Gladwin County; Iosco County; Midland County; Montmorency County; Oscoda County; Otsego County; Presque Isle County | 2011 Apportionment Plan | |
