= Michigan's 33rd Senate district =

American legislative district

Michigan's 33rd State Senate district
Senator
Rick Outman; R–Six Lakes
- Demographics: 87% White; 2.1% Black; 5.2% Hispanic; 0.5% Asian; 0.3% Native American; 0.7% Other; 4.3% Multiracial
- Population (2024): 270,738

Michigan's 33rd Senate district is one of 38 districts in the Michigan Senate. The 33rd district was created in 1953 due to the adoption of a state constitutional amendment via ballot initiative in November 1952. The 1908 state constitution initially only allowed for 32 senate districts. It has been represented by Republican Rick Outman since 2019, succeeding fellow Republican Judy Emmons.

== Geography ==
District 33 encompasses all of Newaygo and Montcalm counties, as well as parts of Ionia, Kent, Lake, Muskegon, and Ottawa counties.

=== 2011 Apportionment Plan ===
District 33, as dictated by the 2011 Apportionment Plan, covered all of Clare, Gratiot, Isabella, Mecosta, and Montcalm Counties in the dead center of the state. Communities in the district included Mount Pleasant, Big Rapids, Alma, St. Louis, Greenville, Clare, Harrison, Ithaca, Canadian Lakes, and Union Township.

The district was located almost entirely within Michigan's 4th congressional district, also slightly extending into the 3rd district. It overlapped with the 70th, 93rd, 97th, 99th, and 102nd districts of the Michigan House of Representatives.

== List of senators ==
Senator	Party	Dates	Residence	Notes
Lewis G. Christman	Republican	1955–1960	Ann Arbor	
Stanley G. Thayer	Republican	1961–1964	Ann Arbor	
Jan B. Vanderploeg	Democratic	1965–1966	North Muskegon	
Oscar E. Bouwsma	Republican	1967–1974	Muskegon	
Anthony A. Derezinski	Democratic	1975–1978	Muskegon	
Phillip J. Arthurhultz	Republican	1979–1994	Whitehall	
Jon Cisky	Republican	1995–1998	Thomas Township	
Michael Goschka	Republican	1999–2002	Brant	
Alan Cropsey	Republican	2003–2010	DeWitt	
Judy Emmons	Republican	2011–2018	Sheridan	
Rick Outman	Republican	2019–present	Six Lakes	

== Recent election results ==
=== 2020s ===
2026 Michigan Senate election
Primary election
Party	Candidate	Votes	%
General election
Republican	Gina Johnsen	79,983	65.51
Democratic	Stan Opal	42,115	34.49
Total votes		122,098	100
Republican hold			

2022 Michigan Senate election, District 33
Party	Candidate	Votes	%
Republican	Rick Outman (incumbent)	77,239	66.2
Democratic	Mark Bignell	36,757	31.7
Libertarian	Jay Gillotte	2,438	2.1
Total votes		116,592	100
Republican hold			

=== 2018 ===
2018 Michigan Senate election, District 33
Primary election
Party	Candidate	Votes	%
Republican	Rick Outman	16,681	71.8
Republican	Gregory Alexander	6,554	28.2
Total votes		23,235	100
Democratic	Mark Bignell	8,293	57.9
Democratic	John Hoppough	6,025	42.1
Total votes		14,318	100
General election
Republican	Rick Outman	49,856	58.7
Democratic	Mark Bignell	32,375	38.1
Constitution	Christopher Comden	2,633	3.1
Total votes		84,864	100
Republican hold			

=== 2014 ===
2014 Michigan Senate election, District 33
Party	Candidate	Votes	%
Republican	Judy Emmons (incumbent)	36,420	57.2
Democratic	Fred Sprague	27,235	42.8
Total votes		63,655	100
Republican hold			

=== Federal and statewide results ===
Year	Office	Results
2020	President	Trump 61.7 – 36.4%
2018	Senate	James 55.4 – 41.9%
2018	Governor	Schuette 53.4 – 43.0%
2016	President	Trump 58.6 – 35.4%
2014	Senate	Peters 49.1 – 45.4%
2014	Governor	Snyder 53.0 – 43.7%
2012	President	Romney 50.9 – 47.9%
2012	Senate	Stabenow 55.3 – 41.1%

== Historical district boundaries ==
Map	Description	Apportionment Plan	Notes
	Lake County; Manistee County (part); Filer Township; Manistee; Manistee Township; Mason County; Muskegon County; Oceana County	1964 Apportionment Plan	
	Lake County (part); Excluding; Chase Township; Manistee County; Mason County; Muskegon County; Newaygo County (part); Beaver Township; Big Prairie Township; Dayton Township; Denver Township; Everett Township; Goodwell Township; Lilley Township; Lincoln Township; Merrill Township; Monroe Township; Norwich Township; Sherman Township; Troy Township; White Cloud; Wilcox Township; Oceana County	1972 Apportionment Plan	
	Mason County; Muskegon County; Newaygo County; Oceana County	1982 Apportionment Plan	
	Gratiot County; Saginaw County	1992 Apportionment Plan	
	Clinton County; Ionia County; Isabella County; Montcalm County	2001 Apportionment Plan	
	Clare County; Gratiot County; Isabella County; Mecosta County; Montcalm County	2011 Apportionment Plan	
