= White Cloud Public Schools =

School district in Michigan

Address
- 555 East Wilcox Avenue White Cloud, Newaygo County, Michigan, 49349; United States

District information
- Grades: Kindergarten–12
- Superintendent: Ed Canning
- Schools: 3
- Budget: $14,702,000 2022-2023 expenditures
- NCES District ID: 2636060

Students and staff
- Students: 908 (2024-2025)
- Teachers: 51.87 (on an FTE basis) (2024-2025)
- Staff: 130.93 FTE (2024-2025)
- Student–teacher ratio: 17.51 (2024-2025)
- District mascot: Indians

Other information
- Website: www.whitecloud.net

White Cloud Public Schools is a public school district in Newaygo County, in West Michigan. It serves White Cloud, Wilcox Township, and parts of the townships of Big Prairie, Denver, Everett, Goodwell, Lincoln, Merrill, Monroe, Norwich, and Sherman.

== History ==
A 1952 newspaper article reported that the district enrolled 729 students, including 105 attending small rural schools. The remaining students were divided between a four-room elementary school and the main school building, originally constructed in 1880 with additions completed in 1922 and 1936. That year, overcrowding prompted district officials to seek a millage increase to fund construction of a new elementary school.

The new elementary school was built in 1954. A new high school opened in 1961. The current high school, constructed as an addition to the former high school building, was completed in fall 1992. At that time, the former high school was converted into the middle school.

A bond issue passed in 2001 to build a school for grades four through six. It is currently used as the district's elementary school.

== Schools ==
Schools in White Cloud Public Schools district share a campus on East Wilcox Street, west of the town of White Cloud.

Schools in White Cloud Public Schools district
School	Address	Notes
White Cloud High School	555 E Wilcox Avenue, White Cloud	Grades 9–12
White Cloud Junior High School	555 E Wilcox, White Cloud	Grades 6–8
White Cloud Elementary	585 E Pine Hill Avenue, White Cloud	Grades K-5
