= List of Michigan State Historic Sites in Newaygo County =

Location of Newaygo County in Michigan

The following is a list of Michigan State Historic Sites in Newaygo County, Michigan. Sites marked with a dagger (†) are also listed on the National Register of Historic Places in Newaygo County, Michigan.

== Current listings ==
Name	Image	Location	City	Listing date
Big Prairie Grange No. 935 Hall (demolished)	Big Prairie Grange Hall	1968 Elm Avenue	Big Prairie	March 28, 1985
Birch Grove School	Birch Grove School	3962 North Felch, intersection of Five Mile Road	White Cloud	October 2, 1980
Croton Congregational Church	Croton Congregational Church	Southeast corner of Croton-Hardy Drive and Division Street	Croton	January 22, 1987
Croton Hydroelectric Dam Commemorative Designation†	Croton Hydroelectric Plant	Croton Dam Road	Croton	August 16, 1979
Ensley Windmill Tower		4634 South Luce Avenue	Fremont	July 26, 1978
First Christian Reformed Church (Demolished)		201 North Decker Avenue	Fremont	January 20, 1984
Cornelius Gerber Cottage	Cornelius Gerber Cottage	6480 West Cottage Grove	Fremont	October 23, 1979
Grand Rapids, Newaygo, and Lake Shore Railroad Company Depot and Water Tower	Grant Water Tower	East of Front Street between Lincoln and Pine streets	Grant	June 10, 1980
Hardy Hydroelectric Plant†		6928 East 36th Street	Newaygo	2004
Lilley District No. 5 School	Lilley District No. 5 School	Northeast corner Bingham and Main		July 15, 1999
Oak Grove District No. 3 Schoolhouse		6382 East 80th	Newaygo vicinity	June 30, 1988
Penoyer's Sawmill	Pennoyer's Sawmill	Penoyer Creek, near the M-37 bridge	Newaygo	August 22, 1985
Saint Mark's Episcopal Church	Mark's Episcopal Church	30 Justice Street	Newaygo	September 21, 1983
Daniel Weaver House	Daniel Weaver House	NW Corner of Michigan Avenue and Cook Street	Hesperia	September 26, 1987
White Cloud Village Hall (Demolished)		1084 Wilcox	White Cloud	March 16, 1982
John F. Woods Residence	John F. Woods House	59 Bridge Street	Newaygo	June 10, 1980

== See also ==
- National Register of Historic Places listings in Newaygo County, Michigan

== Sources ==
- Historic Sites Online – Newaygo County. Michigan State Housing Developmental Authority. Accessed January 23, 2011.
