= Dayton Township, Michigan =

Dayton Township is the name of some places in the U.S. state of Michigan:

- Dayton Township, Newaygo County, Michigan
- Dayton Township, Tuscola County, Michigan

== See also ==
- Dayton Township (disambiguation)
