= Dayton Township, Iowa =

Dayton Township in the U.S. state of Iowa may refer to:

- Dayton Township, Bremer County
- Dayton Township, Butler County
- Dayton Township, Cedar County
- Dayton Township, Chickasaw County
- Dayton Township, Iowa County
- Dayton Township, Webster County
- Dayton Township, Wright County

== See also ==
- Dayton Township (disambiguation)
