= Brooks, Michigan =

Brooks, Michigan may refer to:

- Brooks, Bay County, Michigan
- Brooks, Newaygo County, Michigan
