= White Cloud Airport =

Airport in Michigan, United States

- IATA: none; ICAO: none; FAA LID: 42C

Summary
- Airport type: Public
- Owner: City of White Cloud
- Serves: White Cloud, Michigan
- Elevation AMSL: 914 ft / 279 m
- Coordinates: 43°33′35″N 85°46′27″W

Map
- Location of airport in Michigan 42C (the United States)

Runways
Direction	Length		Surface
Direction	ft	m	Surface
18/36	2,917	889	Asphalt

Statistics (2020)
- Aircraft operations: 996

White Cloud Airport (FAA LID: 42C) is a public airport owned and operated by the City of White Cloud located 1m (1.6 km) north of White Cloud, a city in Newaygo County, Michigan, United States. The airport is uncontrolled, and is used for general aviation purposes. It is included in the Federal Aviation Administration (FAA) National Plan of Integrated Airport Systems for 2017–2021, in which it is categorized as a basic general aviation facility. .The airport covers an area of 72 acres (29 ha).

The airport has one runway, designated as runway 18/36 and paved with asphalt. It measures 2916 x 60 ft (889 x 18 m).

There is a fixed-base operator at the airport that sells fuel.

For the 12-month period ending December 31, 2020, the airport had 996 aircraft operations, an average of 83 per month. It was composed entirely of general aviation. For the same time period, 11 aircraft were based on the field, all airplanes: 10 single-engine and 1 multi-engine.

== Accidents and incidents ==
- On July 15, 2004, a Mooney M20 sustained substantial damage on impact with terrain during a forced landing at the White Cloud Airport. The probable cause was found to be a loss of engine power during cruise flight due to the mechanic's improper maintenance, the disconnected oil line, the oil leak from the disconnected line, and the unsuitable terrain the pilot encountered during the forced landing.

== See also ==
- List of airports in Michigan
