= Goodwell =

Goodwell may refer to:

- Goodwell, Oklahoma
- Goodwell Township, Michigan
- Goodwell Clothing Company, "looking good, living well"
