= Norwich Township, Michigan =

Norwich Township may refer to the following places in the U.S. state of Michigan:

- Norwich Township, Missaukee County, Michigan
- Norwich Township, Newaygo County, Michigan
