= Woodville, Michigan =

Woodville, Michigan may refer to one of the following places:

- Woodville, Bay County, Michigan, an unincorporated community Pinconning Township
- Woodville, Newaygo County, Michigan, an unincorporated community in Monroe and Norwich townships
