= Dayton Township =

Dayton Township may refer to the following places in the United States:

- Dayton Township, LaSalle County, Illinois
- Dayton Township, Bremer County, Iowa
- Dayton Township, Butler County, Iowa
- Dayton Township, Cedar County, Iowa
- Dayton Township, Chickasaw County, Iowa
- Dayton Township, Wright County, Iowa
- Dayton Township, Saline County, Kansas
- Dayton Township, Newaygo County, Michigan
- Dayton Township, Tuscola County, Michigan
- Dayton Township, Newton County, Missouri
