= 1884 United States presidential election in Michigan =

- November 4, 1884

All 13 Michigan votes to the Electoral College
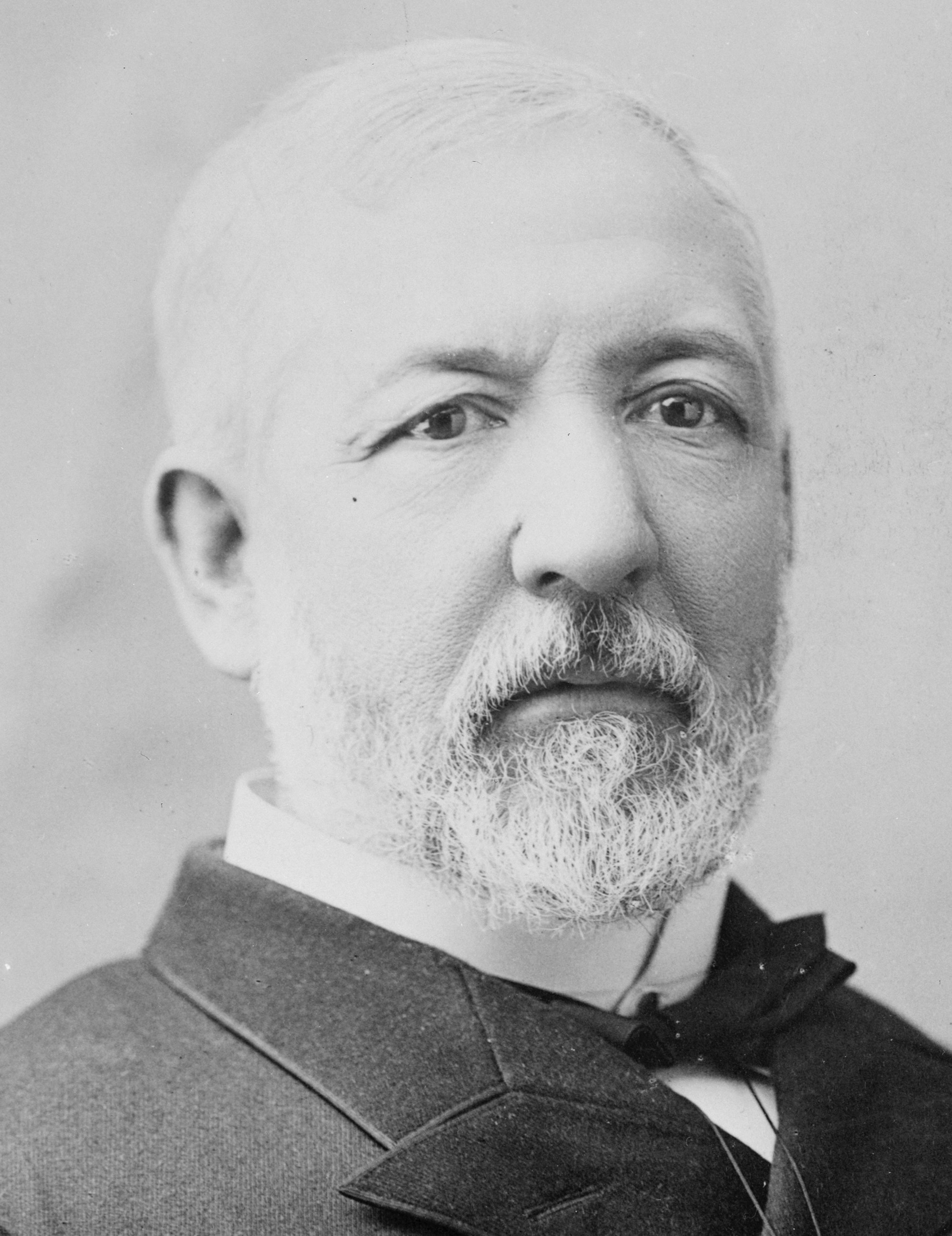

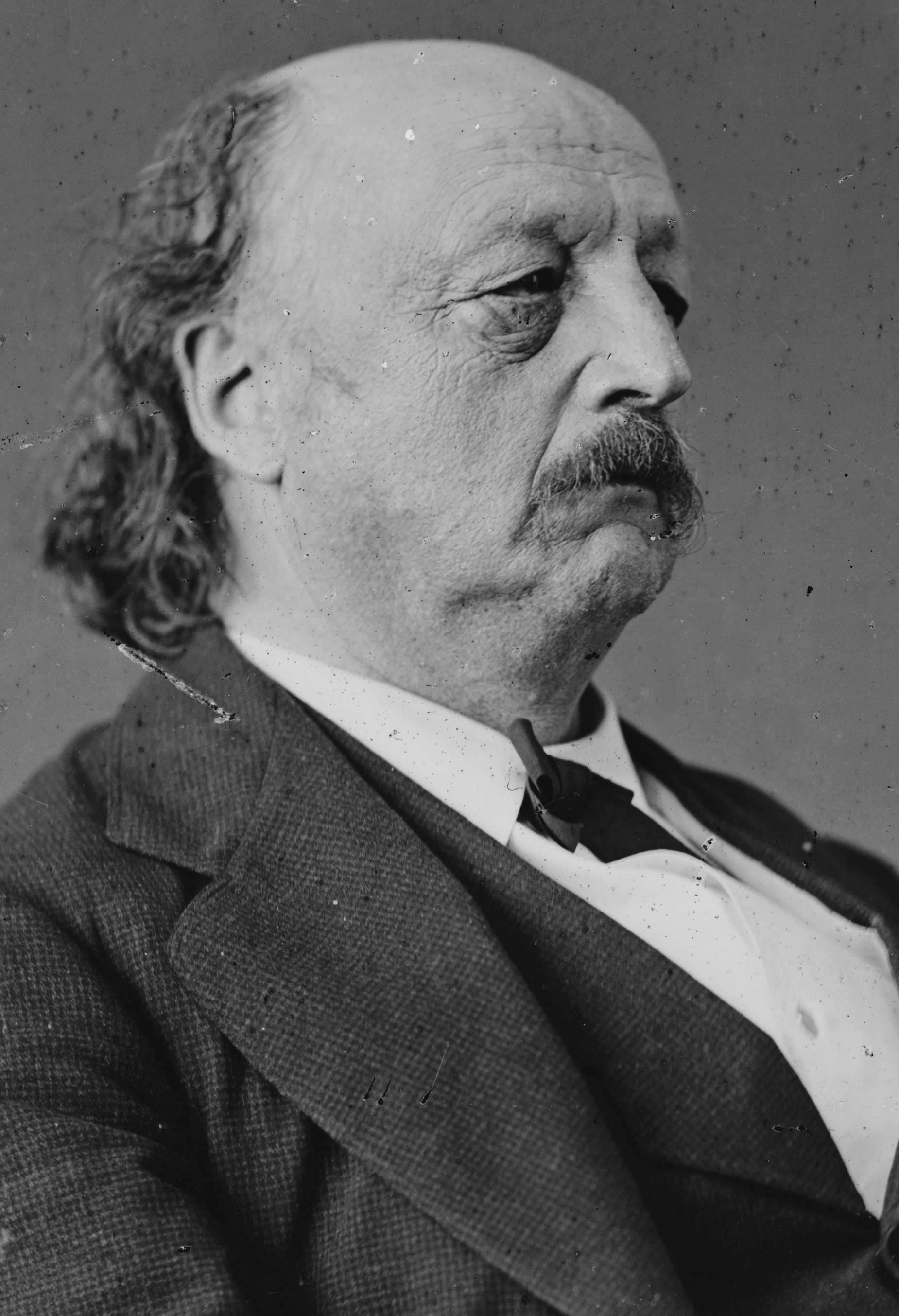
Nominee	James G. Blaine	Grover Cleveland	Benjamin Butler
Party	Republican	Democratic	Greenback
Alliance			Anti-Monopoly Party
Home state	Maine	New York	Massachusetts
Running mate	John A. Logan	Thomas A. Hendricks	Absolom M. West
Electoral vote	13	0	0
Popular vote	192,669	149,835 (Note: This is the total for the single Democratic elector would did not also appear on the Greenback ticket, see detailed elector results.)	41,390 (Note: This is the total for the single Greenback elector would did not also appear on the Democratic ticket, see detailed elector results.)
Percentage	47.79%	37.17%	10.27%
County results
Blaine
40–50%
50–60%
60–70%
70–80%
Cleveland
40–50%
50–60%
60–70%
80–90%
Butler
100%
President before election
Chester A. Arthur
Republican
Elected President
Grover Cleveland
Democratic

The 1884 United States presidential election in Michigan took place on November 4, 1884, as part of the 1884 United States presidential election. Voters chose 13 representatives, or electors, to the Electoral College, who voted for president and vice president.

Benjamin Butler received the nominations of both the Greenback and Anti-Monopoly parties in Michigan. Butler initially hoped to organize fusion tickets with the minority party in each state in the election, a strategy designed to capitalize on the cross-partisan popularity of many elements of the candidate's program. The Greenbacks succeeded in negotiating fusion arrangements with the Democratic Party in Michigan, wherein they were balloted separately but shared 12 of the state's 13 electors. The fusion electors agreed to divide their votes between Butler and Democratic candidate Grover Cleveland in proportion to the statewide popular vote for each candidate, had their combined vote been sufficient to achieve a plurality in the state.

Michigan was won by the Republican nominee James G. Blaine over Cleveland and Butler in a close race by only 3,308 votes, a margin of less than 1%.

Barry and Newaygo counties have voted Democratic only once since this election, in 1964.

== Results ==
General Election Results
Party	Pledged to	Elector	Votes
Republican Party	James G. Blaine	Dwight Cutler	192,669
Republican Party	James G. Blaine	James McMillan	192,641
Republican Party	James G. Blaine	George H. French	192,625
Republican Party	James G. Blaine	Lorenzo A. Barker	192,623
Republican Party	James G. Blaine	Charles W. Wells	192,621
Republican Party	James G. Blaine	Josephus Smith	192,618
Republican Party	James G. Blaine	George W. Jenks	192,613
Republican Party	James G. Blaine	Seth McLean	192,613
Republican Party	James G. Blaine	Joseph B. Moore	192,597
Republican Party	James G. Blaine	William S. Wilcox	192,565
Republican Party	James G. Blaine	John Duncan	192,522
Republican Party	James G. Blaine	J. Eastman Johnson	192,336
Republican Party	James G. Blaine	George G. Steketee	192,128
Fusion	Grover Cleveland (Note: The Fusion electors were, in a sense, unpledged, as they planned to apportion themselves between Cleveland and Butler based on the proportion of Democratic and Greenbacker votes to the total Fusion vote.)	Andrew Harshaw	189,361
Fusion	Grover Cleveland	Herman Goeschel	189,294
Fusion	Grover Cleveland	Aaron S. Dykeman	189,290
Fusion	Grover Cleveland	Wildman Mills	189,244
Fusion	Grover Cleveland	Frederick H. Carnahan	189,152
Fusion	Grover Cleveland	John R. Savage	188,654
Fusion	Grover Cleveland	Hiram O. Rose	188,574
Fusion	Grover Cleveland	Alfred L. Millard	188,554
Fusion	Grover Cleveland	William D. Thompson	188,554
Fusion	Grover Cleveland	Alexander K. Kelsey	188,479
Fusion	Grover Cleveland	William B. Moran	187,924
Fusion	Grover Cleveland	John J. Watkins	186,927
Democratic Party	Grover Cleveland	Jonathan W. Flanders	149,835 (Note: This represents approximately the proportion of Democratic voters within the Fusion ticket.)
Greenback Party	Benjamin Butler	Moses W. Field	41,490 (Note: Field was a well-known Greenbacker and would have voted for Butler in the Electoral College. His votes represent approximately the proportion of Greenback voters within the Fusion ticket.)
Prohibition Party	John St. John	John Russell	18,403
Prohibition Party	John St. John	Oscar M. Brownson	18,403
Prohibition Party	John St. John	Thomas A. Granger	18,403
Prohibition Party	John St. John	Emory A. Richards	18,402
Prohibition Party	John St. John	Samuel Dickey	18,400
Prohibition Party	John St. John	Brent Harding	18,400
Prohibition Party	John St. John	Darius H. Stone	18,400
Prohibition Party	John St. John	Henry Davis	18,398
Prohibition Party	John St. John	Frank B. Cressey	18,389
Prohibition Party	John St. John	Guernsey P. Waring	18,376
Prohibition Party	John St. John	Benjah W. Warren	18,104
Prohibition Party	John St. John	George Atchison	17,982
Prohibition Party	John St. John	Moses Mix	17,740
Straight Butler	Benjamin Butler	Charles Benton	753
Straight Butler	Benjamin Butler	Charles Benton	746
Straight Butler	Benjamin Butler	Charles H. Stone	716
Straight Butler	Benjamin Butler	Charles H. Williams	706
Straight Butler	Benjamin Butler	John D. Cotharin	550
Straight Butler	Benjamin Butler	Jonathan P. Hinshaw	540
Write-in		Scattering	40
		Blank	46
Votes cast (Note: Based on highest elector on each ticket)			401,272

=== Results by county ===
The fusion between the Democrats and Greenbackers presents difficulties when interpreting the results. On one hand, it would be easy to use the votes for Flanders and Field separately for Cleveland and Butler, respectively. This does cause Butler to appear to have run ahead of both Cleveland and Blaine in Arenac County, for instance. However, splitting the Cleveland and Butler votes in this manner masks how close the election actually was; the Republican electors only narrowly ran ahead of the 12 Fusion electors by about 3,300 votes. Using Flanders' figures for Cleveland makes it falsely appear that Blaine easily won the state by double digits. Additionally, the combined total for Flanders and Field exceeds that of the highest fusion elector (Harshaw), although it is still less than that of the lowest Republican elector (Steketee). The 1885 Michigan Manual lists the county results for all three of Harshaw, Flanders, and Field, with a note implying that the results for the latter two are to be interpreted separately from the rest. Based on the split between Democratic and Greenbacker vote, had the Fusion ticket been elected, the electoral votes from Michigan likely would have been nine for Cleveland, three for Butler, and one for Blaine. (Note: Blaine would have received an electoral vote from Michigan in this case because with all electors being chosen individually at large, the top 13 candidates would be elected. With the Fusion ticket running only 12 electors, Flanders and Field would have both run well behind the Republican electors. Given the closeness of election, it would also not have been out of the realm of possibility that in a Fusion victory scenario, one or more Republican electors actually could have run ahead of the lowest Fusion electors, resulting in an even more chaotic split in Michigan's Electoral College delegation.)

County	James G. Blaine Republican		Grover Cleveland Fusion		John St. John Prohibition		Benjamin Butler Greenback		Margin		Total votes cast
County	#	%	#	%	#	%	#	%	#	%	Total votes cast
Alcona	545	61.51%	339	38.26%	1	0.11%	1	0.11%	206	23.25%	886
Allegan	4,080	48.27%	3,445	40.75%	927	10.97%	1	0.01%	635	7.51%	8,453
Alpena	927	43.87%	1,127	53.34%	59	2.79%	0	0.00%	-200	-9.47%	2,113
Antrim	1,066	58.44%	721	39.53%	37	2.03%	0	0.00%	345	18.91%	1,824
Arenac	323	31.95%	607	60.04%	44	4.35%	37	3.66%	-284	-28.09%	1,011
Baraga	396	56.33%	307	43.67%	0	0.00%	0	0.00%	89	12.66%	703
Barry	2,699	44.71%	2,937	48.65%	401	6.64%	0	0.00%	-238	-3.94%	6,037
Bay	2,916	35.15%	4,963	59.83%	161	1.94%	255	3.07%	-2,047	-24.68%	8,295
Benzie	556	54.89%	380	37.51%	77	7.60%	0	0.00%	176	17.37%	1,013
Berrien	4,445	48.02%	4,458	48.16%	345	3.73%	0	0.00%	-13	-0.14%	9,256 (Note: Includes 8 Scattering votes)
Branch	3,671	52.08%	2,958	41.96%	419	5.94%	1	0.01%	713	10.11%	7,049
Calhoun	5,113	51.20%	4,309	43.15%	564	5.65%	0	0.00%	804	8.05%	9,986
Cass	2,764	48.25%	2,744	47.90%	216	3.77%	5	0.09%	20	0.35%	5,729
Charlevoix	1,043	54.21%	825	42.88%	56	2.91%	0	0.00%	218	11.33%	1,924
Cheboygan	777	45.33%	897	52.33%	40	2.33%	0	0.00%	-120	-7.00%	1,714
Chippewa	686	51.12%	635	47.32%	21	1.56%	0	0.00%	51	3.80%	1,342
Clare	622	46.21%	685	50.89%	34	2.53%	5	0.37%	-63	-4.68%	1,346
Clinton	2,782	44.03%	3,220	50.96%	315	4.98%	2	0.03%	-438	-6.93%	6,319
Crawford	304	56.72%	223	41.60%	9	1.68%	0	0.00%	81	15.11%	536
Delta	1,201	66.13%	609	33.54%	6	0.33%	0	0.00%	592	32.60%	1,816
Eaton	4,106	49.37%	3,717	44.69%	494	5.94%	0	0.00%	389	4.68%	8,317
Emmet	779	43.79%	895	50.31%	105	5.90%	0	0.00%	-116	-6.52%	1,779
Genesee	4,328	48.14%	3,657	40.68%	1,005	11.18%	0	0.00%	671	7.46%	8,990
Gladwin	288	55.49%	213	41.04%	0	0.00%	18	3.47%	75	14.45%	519
Grand Traverse	1,645	64.59%	808	31.72%	94	3.69%	0	0.00%	837	32.86%	2,547
Gratiot	2,676	46.99%	2,736	48.04%	283	4.97%	0	0.00%	-60	-1.05%	5,695
Hillsdale	4,315	52.80%	3,222	39.43%	629	7.70%	6	0.07%	1,093	13.37%	8,172
Houghton	2,383	57.90%	1,694	41.16%	39	0.95%	0	0.00%	689	16.74%	4,116
Huron	1,355	39.48%	1,898	55.30%	179	5.22%	0	0.00%	-543	-15.82%	3,432
Ingham	3,709	42.36%	4,562	52.11%	472	5.39%	12	0.14%	-853	-9.74%	8,755
Ionia	3,552	45.10%	3,814	48.43%	503	6.39%	7	0.09%	-262	-3.33%	7,876
Iosco	1,016	52.83%	864	44.93%	43	2.24%	0	0.00%	152	7.90%	1,923
Isabella	1,617	48.78%	1,610	48.57%	83	2.50%	5	0.15%	7	0.21%	3,315
Jackson	4,804	43.86%	5,452	49.78%	645	5.89%	51	0.47%	-648	-5.92%	10,952
Kalamazoo	4,515	51.78%	3,750	43.00%	455	5.22%	0	0.00%	765	8.77%	8,720
Kalkaska	630	60.93%	369	35.69%	35	3.38%	0	0.00%	261	25.24%	1,034
Kent	9,007	45.74%	9,639	48.95%	1,040	5.28%	5	0.03%	-632	-3.21%	19,691
Keweenaw	620	74.43%	201	24.13%	12	1.44%	0	0.00%	419	50.30%	833
Lake	951	55.42%	656	38.23%	109	6.35%	0	0.00%	295	17.19%	1,716
Lapeer	3,062	50.15%	2,741	44.89%	276	4.52%	27	0.44%	321	5.26%	6,106
Leelanau	811	57.80%	571	40.70%	21	1.50%	0	0.00%	240	17.11%	1,403
Lenawee	5,827	46.63%	5,572	44.59%	1,097	8.78%	1	0.01%	255	2.04%	12,497
Livingston	2,597	44.72%	2,938	50.59%	272	4.68%	0	0.00%	-341	-5.87%	5,807
Mackinac	479	46.06%	558	53.65%	3	0.29%	0	0.00%	-79	-7.60%	1,040
Macomb	2,782	42.98%	3,464	53.51%	223	3.45%	4	0.06%	-682	-10.54%	6,473
Manistee	1,305	38.46%	1,926	56.76%	162	4.77%	0	0.00%	-621	-18.30%	3,393
Manitou	18	10.84%	148	89.16%	0	0.00%	0	0.00%	-130	-78.31%	166
Marquette	4,230	73.49%	1,478	25.68%	48	0.83%	0	0.00%	2,752	47.81%	5,756
Mason	1,299	50.49%	1,217	47.30%	57	2.22%	0	0.00%	82	3.19%	2,573
Mecosta	2,365	53.76%	1,847	41.99%	187	4.25%	0	0.00%	518	11.78%	4,399
Menominee	2,614	73.12%	936	26.18%	25	0.70%	0	0.00%	1,678	46.94%	3,575
Midland	1,071	53.36%	883	44.00%	44	2.19%	9	0.45%	188	9.37%	2,007
Missaukee	470	54.09%	373	42.92%	26	2.99%	0	0.00%	97	11.16%	869
Monroe	3,025	41.89%	3,920	54.29%	224	3.10%	51	0.71%	-895	-12.39%	7,221 (Note: Includes 1 Scattering vote)
Montcalm	3,857	49.32%	3,788	48.43%	173	2.21%	3	0.04%	69	0.88%	7,821
Montmorency	93	38.91%	137	57.32%	9	3.77%	0	0.00%	-44	-18.41%	239
Muskegon	3,483	49.79%	3,171	45.33%	317	4.53%	25	0.36%	312	4.46%	6,996
Newaygo	1,971	46.65%	2,051	48.54%	203	4.80%	0	0.00%	-80	-1.89%	4,225
Oakland	4,842	45.03%	5,386	50.09%	522	4.85%	3	0.03%	-544	-5.06%	10,753
Oceana	1,637	51.04%	1,213	37.82%	357	11.13%	0	0.00%	424	13.22%	3,207
Ogemaw	478	49.48%	472	48.86%	16	1.66%	0	0.00%	6	0.62%	966
Ontonagon	301	53.94%	233	41.76%	24	4.30%	0	0.00%	68	12.19%	558
Osceola	1,497	58.43%	792	30.91%	273	10.66%	0	0.00%	705	27.52%	2,562
Oscoda	199	68.62%	87	30.00%	4	1.38%	0	0.00%	112	38.62%	290
Otsego	485	52.95%	410	44.76%	21	2.29%	0	0.00%	75	8.19%	916
Ottawa	3,758	53.25%	3,049	43.21%	231	3.27%	5	0.07%	709	10.05%	7,057 (Note: Includes 14 Scattering votes)
Presque Isle	394	63.65%	225	36.35%	0	0.00%	0	0.00%	169	27.30%	619
Roscommon	427	48.80%	435	49.71%	2	0.23%	11	1.26%	-8	-0.91%	875
Saginaw	5,939	44.68%	7,047	53.02%	205	1.54%	100	0.75%	-1,108	-8.34%	13,291
Sanilac	1,923	48.88%	1,817	46.19%	165	4.19%	12	0.31%	106	2.69%	3,934 (Note: Includes 17 Scattering votes)
Schoolcraft	518	62.48%	289	34.86%	22	2.65%	0	0.00%	229	27.62%	829
Shiawassee	2,705	41.71%	3,141	48.43%	623	9.61%	17	0.26%	-436	-6.72%	6,486
St. Clair	4,017	43.99%	4,668	51.12%	348	3.81%	53	0.58%	-651	-7.13%	9,132 (Note: Includes 46 Blank votes)
St. Joseph	3,261	46.89%	3,554	51.11%	133	1.91%	6	0.09%	-293	-4.21%	6,954
Tuscola	2,914	49.73%	2,624	44.78%	322	5.49%	0	0.00%	290	4.95%	5,860
Van Buren	4,219	56.11%	2,933	39.01%	361	4.80%	6	0.08%	1,286	17.10%	7,519
Washtenaw	4,049	40.53%	5,315	53.20%	617	6.18%	9	0.09%	-1,266	-12.67%	9,990
Wayne	17,315	44.46%	20,930	53.74%	703	1.80%	0	0.00%	-3,615	-9.28%	38,948
Wexford	1,220	54.81%	876	39.35%	130	5.84%	0	0.00%	344	15.45%	2,226
Total	192,669	48.01%	189,361	47.19%	18,403	4.59%	753	0.19%	3,308	0.82%	401,272

==== Counties that flipped from Democratic to Republican ====
- Baraga
- Gladwin

==== Counties that flipped from Republican to Democratic ====
- Alpena
- Barry
- Bay
- Berrien
- Cheboygan
- Clare
- Clinton
- Emmet
- Gratiot
- Huron
- Ingham
- Ionia
- Jackson
- Kent
- Livingston
- Manistee
- Newaygo
- Oakland
- Shiawassee
- St. Clair
- St. Joseph
- Wayne

== See also ==
- United States presidential elections in Michigan
