= Croton Township, Michigan =

- Civil township
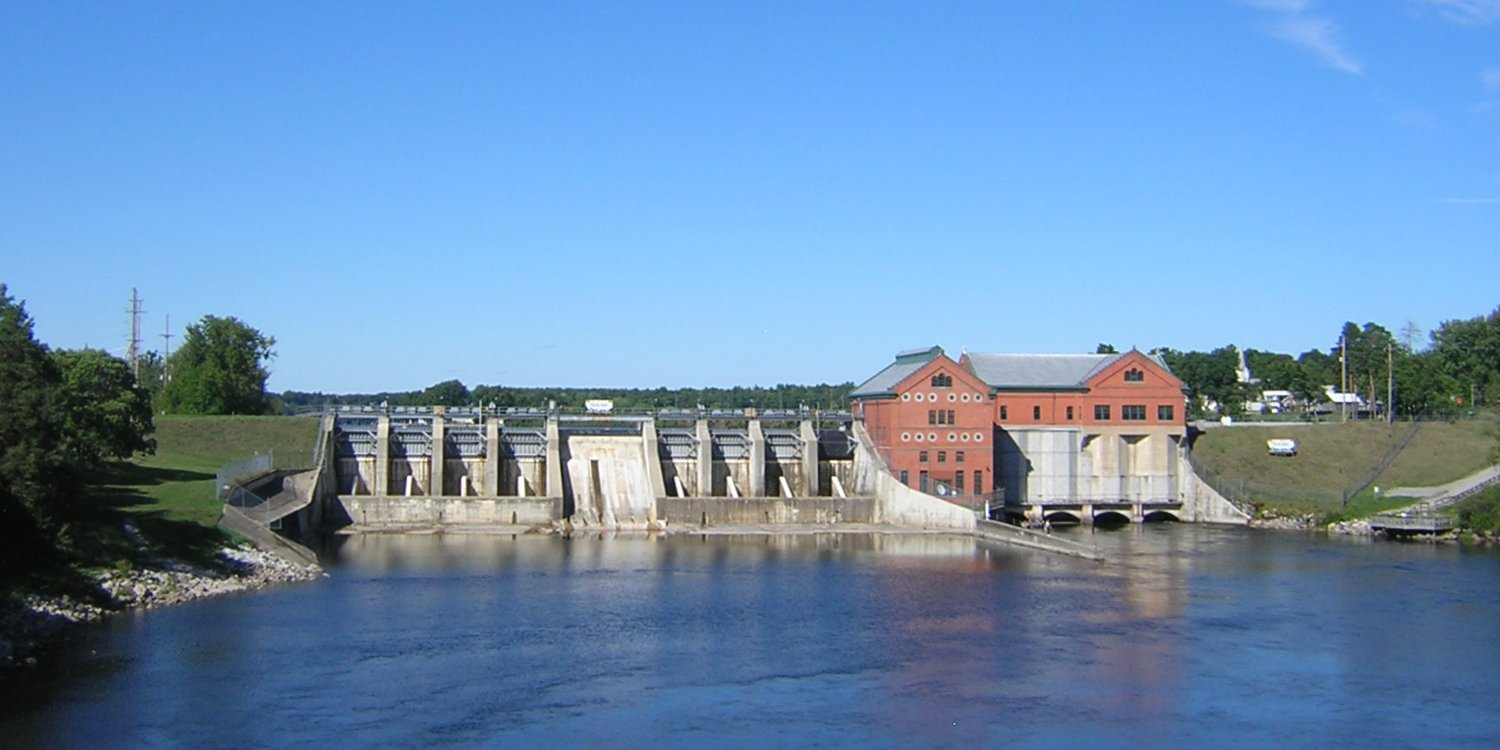
- The Croton Dam along the Muskegon River

- Location within the state of Michigan Location within the United States
- Coordinates: 43°25′03″N 85°37′25″W
- Country: United States
- State: Michigan
- County: Newaygo
- Established: 1840

Government
  - Supervisor: Morgan Heinzman
  - Clerk: Debbra Wright

Area
  - Total: 36.38 sq mi (94.22 km^{2})
  - Land: 33.70 sq mi (87.28 km^{2})
  - Water: 2.68 sq mi (6.94 km^{2})
- Elevation: 906 ft (276 m)

Population (2020)
  - Total: 3,368
  - Density: 99.9/sq mi (38.6/km^{2})
- Time zone: UTC-5 (Eastern (EST))
  - Summer (DST): UTC-4 (EDT)
- ZIP code(s): 49239 (Howard City); 49337 (Newaygo)
- Area code: 231
- FIPS code: 26-18980
- GNIS feature ID: 1626143
- Website: Official website

Croton Township is a civil township of Newaygo County in the U.S. state of Michigan. The population was 3,368 at the 2020 census.

== Communities ==
- Croton is an unincorporated community located within the township at 43°26′20″N 85°39′39″W. The community was first settled in 1840 and centered around a new sawmill. Originally known as Muskegon Fork, it was given a post office under the name Stearns Mill on December 30, 1847. It was renamed to Croton on September 15, 1850. Croton was platted in 1854 and incorporated as a village in 1870. The post office closed on January 31, 1908, and the village soon after disincorporated.
- Croton Heights is an unincorporated community located along the Muskegon River at 43°27′23″N 85°38′05″W.
- Riverview is an unincorporated community located just northeast of Croton along the Muskegon River at 43°26′53″N 85°39′09″W.
- Tift Corner is an unincorporated community located along M-82 in the southern portion of the township at 43°23′45″N 85°37′22″W.

== Geography ==
According to the U.S. Census Bureau, the township has a total area of 36.38 square miles (94.22 km^{2}), of which 33.70 square miles (87.28 km^{2}) is land and 2.68 square miles (6.94 km^{2}) (7.37%) is water.

The Croton Dam on the Muskegon River is located in the township.

=== Major highways ===
- M-82 (88th Street) runs east–west through the southern portion of the township.

== Demographics ==
As of the census of 2000, there were 3,042 people, 1,222 households, and 874 families residing in the township. The population density was 89.4 inhabitants per square mile (34.5/km^{2}). There were 1,696 housing units at an average density of 49.8 per square mile (19.2/km^{2}). The racial makeup of the township was 96.84% White, 0.39% African American, 0.79% Native American, 0.13% Asian, 0.85% from other races, and 0.99% from two or more races. Hispanic or Latino of any race were 1.64% of the population.

There were 1,222 households, out of which 29.7% had children under the age of 18 living with them, 60.6% were married couples living together, 7.0% had a female householder with no husband present, and 28.4% were non-families. 24.2% of all households were made up of individuals, and 8.8% had someone living alone who was 65 years of age or older. The average household size was 2.49 and the average family size was 2.94.

In the township the population was spread out, with 25.2% under the age of 18, 6.4% from 18 to 24, 28.3% from 25 to 44, 25.6% from 45 to 64, and 14.5% who were 65 years of age or older. The median age was 39 years. For every 100 females, there were 104.6 males. For every 100 females age 18 and over, there were 103.0 males.

The median income for a household in the township was $41,596, and the median income for a family was $48,229. Males had a median income of $40,219 versus $22,717 for females. The per capita income for the township was $21,036. About 5.2% of families and 7.4% of the population were below the poverty line, including 7.9% of those under age 18 and 5.0% of those age 65 or over.
