= Dayton Township, Iowa County, Iowa =

Township in Iowa County, Iowa, U.S.

Coordinates: 41.5617°N 92.2469°W

Dayton Township is a township in Iowa County, Iowa, USA.

== History ==
Dayton Township was established in 1857.
