= Home Township, Newaygo County, Michigan =

Home Township, Michigan
- Township
- Location within the state of Michigan Home Township, Michigan (the United States)
- Coordinates: 43°46′1″N 85°44′38″W
- Country: United States
- State: Michigan
- County: Montcalm

Area
  - Total: 35.6 sq mi (92.2 km^{2})
  - Land: 35.6 sq mi (92.1 km^{2})
  - Water: 0.039 sq mi (0.1 km^{2})
- Elevation: 912 ft (278 m)

Population (2020)
  - Total: 238
  - Density: 6.69/sq mi (2.58/km^{2})
- Time zone: UTC-5 (Eastern (EST))
  - Summer (DST): UTC-4 (EDT)
- FIPS code: 26-38860
- GNIS feature ID: 1626484

Home Township is a civil township of Newaygo County in the U.S. state of Michigan. The population was 238 at the 2020 census.

== Geography ==
According to the United States Census Bureau, the township has a total area of 35.6 square miles (92 km^{2}), of which 35.6 square miles (92 km^{2}) is land and 0.04 square miles (0.10 km^{2}) (0.06%) is water.

== Demographics ==
As of the census of 2000, there were 261 people, 100 households, and 74 families residing in the township. The population density was 7.3 per square mile (2.8/km^{2}). There were 220 housing units at an average density of 6.2 per square mile (2.4/km^{2}). The racial makeup of the township was 94.25% White, 0.38% African American, 1.92% Asian, 1.53% from other races, and 1.92% from two or more races. Hispanic or Latino of any race were 2.68% of the population.

There were 100 households, out of which 31.0% had children under the age of 18 living with them, 65.0% were married couples living together, 6.0% had a female householder with no husband present, and 26.0% were non-families. 19.0% of all households were made up of individuals, and 3.0% had someone living alone who was 65 years of age or older. The average household size was 2.61 and the average family size was 3.00.

In the township the population was spread out, with 26.8% under the age of 18, 4.6% from 18 to 24, 26.4% from 25 to 44, 30.3% from 45 to 64, and 11.9% who were 65 years of age or older. The median age was 38 years. For every 100 females, there were 112.2 males. For every 100 females age 18 and over, there were 112.2 males.

The median income for a household in the township was $31,964, and the median income for a family was $36,250. Males had a median income of $31,250 versus $21,875 for females. The per capita income for the township was $14,244. About 2.6% of families and 3.7% of the population were below the poverty line, including 2.7% of those under the age of eighteen and none of those 65 or over.
