= Dayton Township, Newton County, Missouri =

Township in Newton County, Missouri, U.S.

Coordinates: 36.8850°N 94.5131°W

Dayton Township is an inactive township in Newton County, in the U.S. state of Missouri.

Dayton Township derives its name from Dayton, Ohio.
