= Merrill Township, Michigan =

- Township
- Location within the state of Michigan Merrill Township, Michigan (the United States)
- Coordinates: 43°42′3″N 85°50′59″W
- Country: United States
- State: Michigan
- County: Newaygo

Area
  - Total: 35.8 sq mi (92.8 km^{2})
  - Land: 34.9 sq mi (90.4 km^{2})
  - Water: 0.93 sq mi (2.4 km^{2})
- Elevation: 850 ft (259 m)

Population (2020)
  - Total: 741
  - Density: 21.2/sq mi (8.20/km^{2})
- Time zone: UTC-5 (Eastern (EST))
  - Summer (DST): UTC-4 (EDT)
- FIPS code: 26-53160
- GNIS feature ID: 1626728
- Website: https://www.merrilltownship.com/

Merrill Township is a civil township of Newaygo County in the U.S. state of Michigan. The population was 741 at the 2020 census.

== Communities ==
Brohman is a small unincorporated community in the eastern part of the township, between sections 13 and 24 at 43°41′07″N 85°48′56″W, on M-37, about eight miles north of White Cloud and about 15 miles west of Big Rapids. It was established in 1882 under the name of Otia, after Otia Dingman who operated a hotel here. It was also for a time known as Dingman. The ZIP code for the community (which also serves the surrounding area) is 49312.

Woodland Park (also known as "Woodland Park Resort") is an unincorporated community in the northern part of the township, situated mostly between sections three and four on the north side of Woodland Lake (also known as Brookings or Crooked Lake), although settlement extends around the south side of the lake into sections nine and ten. It is at 43°42′52″N 85°51′41″W, about two miles south of Bitely and about two and a half miles northwest of Brohman. The Bitely ZIP code 49309 also includes the Woodland Park area. The community is approximately four square miles and contains a few hundred small parcels; however many of them are undeveloped.

African-American realtors Marion E. Arthur of Cleveland, Ohio, and Alvin E. Wright of Chicago, Illinois, platted the community as an all black resort town in 1923. Woodland Park began when the Brookings Lumber Company sold the remnants of its old lumbering village in Newaygo County. The site, 15 miles south of Idlewild and 37 miles north of Grand Rapids, was first put up for sale in 1920. Marion and his wife Ella Auther used earnings from commissions on the lots they sold at Idlewild to make a down payment on the village's 200 acre lake. By 1921, the Authers purchased most of the Brooking Lumber Company's parcels but still lacked enough money to finalize the deal. Wilbur Lemon, a white businessman from Chicago, Illinois and one of the founders of the Idlewild Resort Company, aided them by purchasing the last remaining Brookings parcel. This allowed the Authers to launch their new resort and rename it Woodland Park. The area experienced a relative decline after the Civil Rights Act of 1964 opened previously all-white resort facilities to African-Americans. The area last had its passenger rail access to Grand Rapids and other mid-western cities in 1966 when the Chesapeake & Ohio Railway terminated service through nearby Bitely and other towns on the route from Traverse City to Grand Rapids.

== Geography ==
According to the United States Census Bureau, the township has a total area of 35.8 square miles (93 km^{2}), of which 34.9 square miles (90 km^{2}) is land and 0.9 square miles (2.3 km^{2}) (2.59%) is water.

== Demographics ==
As of the census of 2000, there were 590 people, 262 households, and 162 families residing in the township. The population density was 16.9 inhabitants per square mile (6.5/km^{2}). There were 782 housing units at an average density of 22.4 per square mile (8.6/km^{2}). The racial makeup of the township was 72.71% White, 20.00% African American, 1.86% Native American, 0.34% from other races, and 5.08% from two or more races. Hispanic or Latino of any race were 3.22% of the population.

There were 262 households, out of which 22.5% had children under the age of 18 living with them, 46.9% were married couples living together, 10.7% had a female householder with no husband present, and 37.8% were non-families. 34.0% of all households were made up of individuals, and 15.3% had someone living alone who was 65 years of age or older. The average household size was 2.25 and the average family size was 2.85.

In the township the population was spread out, with 25.6% under the age of 18, 5.8% from 18 to 24, 21.0% from 25 to 44, 27.1% from 45 to 64, and 20.5% who were 65 years of age or older. The median age was 43 years. For every 100 females, there were 96.7 males. For every 100 females age 18 and over, there were 97.7 males.

The median income for a household in the township was $22,917, and the median income for a family was $26,625. Males had a median income of $24,792 versus $18,125 for females. The per capita income for the township was $13,526. About 16.0% of families and 19.8% of the population were below the poverty line, including 33.0% of those under age 18 and 12.1% of those age 65 or over.
