= Brooks Township, Michigan =

- Township
- Location within the state of Michigan Brooks Township, Michigan (the United States)
- Coordinates: 43°25′35″N 85°45′11″W
- Country: United States
- State: Michigan
- County: Newaygo

Area
  - Total: 34.1 sq mi (88.2 km^{2})
  - Land: 31.7 sq mi (82.2 km^{2})
  - Water: 2.3 sq mi (6.0 km^{2})
- Elevation: 653 ft (199 m)

Population (2020)
  - Total: 3,705
  - Density: 117/sq mi (45.1/km^{2})
- Time zone: UTC-5 (Eastern (EST))
  - Summer (DST): UTC-4 (EDT)
- FIPS code: 26-11060
- GNIS feature ID: 1625989
- Website: https://brookstownshipmi.gov/

Brooks Township is a civil township of Newaygo County in the U.S. state of Michigan. As of the 2020 census, the township population was 3,705.

== Communities ==
- Brooks was established in 1860. It had a post office from 1881 until 1890.

== Geography ==
According to the United States Census Bureau, the township has a total area of 34.0 square miles (88 km^{2}), of which 31.8 square miles (82 km^{2}) is land and 2.3 square miles (6.0 km^{2}) (6.75%) is water.

== Demographics ==
As of the census of 2000, there were 3,671 people, 1,441 households, and 1,050 families residing in the township. The population density was 115.6 inhabitants per square mile (44.6/km^{2}). There were 1,978 housing units at an average density of 62.3 per square mile (24.1/km^{2}). The racial makeup of the township was 96.21% White, 0.19% African American, 0.46% Native American, 0.27% Asian, 0.03% Pacific Islander, 1.72% from other races, and 1.12% from two or more races. Hispanic or Latino of any race were 3.60% of the population.

There were 1,441 households, out of which 32.8% had children under the age of 18 living with them, 61.3% were married couples living together, 6.8% had a female householder with no husband present, and 27.1% were non-families. 22.8% of all households were made up of individuals, and 7.8% had someone living alone who was 65 years of age or older. The average household size was 2.54 and the average family size was 2.99.

In the township the population was spread out, with 27.1% under the age of 18, 5.4% from 18 to 24, 27.2% from 25 to 44, 26.3% from 45 to 64, and 14.1% who were 65 years of age or older. The median age was 39 years. For every 100 females, there were 102.4 males. For every 100 females age 18 and over, there were 103.1 males.

The median income for a household in the township was $42,434, and the median income for a family was $50,440. Males had a median income of $40,882 versus $27,073 for females. The per capita income for the township was $19,088. About 9.6% of families and 11.1% of the population were below the poverty line, including 13.4% of those under age 18 and 9.4% of those age 65 or over.
