= Troy Township, Michigan =

- Township
- Location within the state of Michigan Troy Township, Michigan (the United States)
- Coordinates: 43°47′17″N 85°59′8″W
- Country: United States
- State: Michigan
- County: Newaygo

Area
  - Total: 36.3 sq mi (93.9 km^{2})
  - Land: 36.2 sq mi (93.7 km^{2})
  - Water: 0.077 sq mi (0.2 km^{2})
- Elevation: 843 ft (257 m)

Population (2020)
  - Total: 254
  - Density: 7.02/sq mi (2.71/km^{2})
- Time zone: UTC-5 (Eastern (EST))
  - Summer (DST): UTC-4 (EDT)
- FIPS code: 26-80680
- GNIS feature ID: 1627175

Troy Township is a civil township of Newaygo County in the U.S. state of Michigan. The population was 254 at the 2020 census.

== Geography ==
According to the United States Census Bureau, the township has a total area of 36.2 square miles (94 km^{2}), of which 36.2 square miles (94 km^{2}) is land and 0.1 square miles (0.26 km^{2}) (0.22%) is water.

== Demographics ==
As of the census of 2000, there were 243 people, 97 households, and 67 families residing in the township. The population density was 6.7 per square mile (2.6/km^{2}). There were 184 housing units at an average density of 5.1 per square mile (2.0/km^{2}). The racial makeup of the township was 93.00% White, 2.06% African American, 4.94% from other races. Hispanic or Latino of any race were 4.94% of the population.

There were 97 households, out of which 34.0% had children under the age of 18 living with them, 54.6% were married couples living together, 10.3% had a female householder with no husband present, and 29.9% were non-families. 24.7% of all households were made up of individuals, and 4.1% had someone living alone who was 65 years of age or older. The average household size was 2.51 and the average family size was 2.96.

In the township the population was spread out, with 26.7% under the age of 18, 12.3% from 18 to 24, 22.2% from 25 to 44, 29.6% from 45 to 64, and 9.1% who were 65 years of age or older. The median age was 36 years. For every 100 females, there were 118.9 males. For every 100 females age 18 and over, there were 111.9 males.

The median income for a household in the township was $26,250, and the median income for a family was $32,500. Males had a median income of $28,333 versus $19,375 for females. The per capita income for the township was $12,665. About 18.6% of families and 19.8% of the population were below the poverty line, including 29.3% of those under the age of eighteen and none of those 65 or over.
