= Lincoln Township, Newaygo County, Michigan =

Lincoln Township, Michigan
- Township
- Location within the state of Michigan Lincoln Township, Michigan (the United States)
- Coordinates: 43°36′15″N 85°51′53″W
- Country: United States
- State: Michigan
- County: Newaygo

Area
  - Total: 35.6 sq mi (92.2 km^{2})
  - Land: 35.1 sq mi (90.9 km^{2})
  - Water: 0.46 sq mi (1.2 km^{2})
- Elevation: 961 ft (293 m)

Population (2020)
  - Total: 1,292
  - Density: 36.8/sq mi (14.2/km^{2})
- Time zone: UTC-5 (Eastern (EST))
  - Summer (DST): UTC-4 (EDT)
- FIPS code: 26-47700
- GNIS feature ID: 1626624
- Website: https://lincolntownship.net/

Lincoln Township is a civil township of Newaygo County in the U.S. state of Michigan. The population was 1,292 at the 2020 census.

== Communities ==
- Aetna is an unincorporated community on M-20 in the southwest corner of the township along the boundary with Denver Township at 43°34′04″N 85°55′15″W. Aetna was founded in 1867 by a group of sawmill operators. It had a post office from 1870 to 1914.

== Geography ==
According to the United States Census Bureau, the township has a total area of 35.6 square miles (92.2 km^{2}), of which 35.1 square miles (90.9 km^{2}) is land and 0.5 square mile (1.2 km^{2}) (1.35%) is water.

== Demographics ==
As of the census of 2000, there were 1,338 people, 505 households, and 374 families residing in the township. The population density was 38.1 inhabitants per square mile (14.7/km^{2}). There were 850 housing units at an average density of 24.2 per square mile (9.3/km^{2}). The racial makeup of the township was 92.15% White, 2.62% African American, 0.97% Native American, 0.30% Asian, 2.02% from other races, and 1.94% from two or more races. Hispanic or Latino of any race were 2.99% of the population.

There were 505 households, out of which 32.9% had children under the age of 18 living with them, 60.4% were married couples living together, 9.3% had a female householder with no husband present, and 25.9% were non-families. 22.0% of all households were made up of individuals, and 9.1% had someone living alone who was 65 years of age or older. The average household size was 2.65 and the average family size was 3.06.

In the township the population was spread out, with 29.1% under the age of 18, 5.7% from 18 to 24, 28.3% from 25 to 44, 23.5% from 45 to 64, and 13.3% who were 65 years of age or older. The median age was 38 years. For every 100 females, there were 107.1 males. For every 100 females age 18 and over, there were 102.1 males.

The median income for a household in the township was $35,739, and the median income for a family was $40,677. Males had a median income of $31,842 versus $19,808 for females. The per capita income for the township was $15,697. About 10.4% of families and 12.3% of the population were below the poverty line, including 16.9% of those under age 18 and 7.1% of those age 65 or over.
