= Everett Township, Michigan =

- Township
- Location within the state of Michigan Everett Township, Michigan (the United States)
- Coordinates: 43°31′0″N 85°44′52″W
- Country: United States
- State: Michigan
- County: Newaygo

Area
  - Total: 35.8 sq mi (92.7 km^{2})
  - Land: 35.6 sq mi (92.1 km^{2})
  - Water: 0.23 sq mi (0.6 km^{2})
- Elevation: 866 ft (264 m)

Population (2020)
  - Total: 1,978
  - Density: 55.6/sq mi (21.5/km^{2})
- Time zone: UTC-5 (Eastern (EST))
  - Summer (DST): UTC-4 (EDT)
- FIPS code: 26-26700
- GNIS feature ID: 1626256
- Website: http://www.everetttownship.com/

Everett Township is a civil township of Newaygo County in the U.S. state of Michigan. As of the 2020 census, the township population was 1,978.

== Geography ==
According to the United States Census Bureau, the township has a total area of 35.8 square miles (93 km^{2}), of which 35.6 square miles (92 km^{2}) is land and 0.2 square miles (0.52 km^{2}) (0.67%) is water.

== Demographics ==
As of the census of 2000, there were 1,985 people, 706 households, and 537 families residing in the township. The population density was 55.8 inhabitants per square mile (21.5/km^{2}). There were 894 housing units at an average density of 25.1 per square mile (9.7/km^{2}). The racial makeup of the township was 93.50% White, 3.12% African American, 0.60% Native American, 0.05% Asian, 1.11% from other races, and 1.61% from two or more races. Hispanic or Latino of any race were 2.72% of the population.

There were 706 households, out of which 37.0% had children under the age of 18 living with them, 59.2% were married couples living together, 11.9% had a female householder with no husband present, and 23.8% were non-families. 18.3% of all households were made up of individuals, and 5.2% had someone living alone who was 65 years of age or older. The average household size was 2.80 and the average family size was 3.17.

In the township the population was spread out, with 31.4% under the age of 18, 7.0% from 18 to 24, 27.6% from 25 to 44, 25.7% from 45 to 64, and 8.4% who were 65 years of age or older. The median age was 36 years. For every 100 females, there were 101.3 males. For every 100 females age 18 and over, there were 97.7 males.

The median income for a household in the township was $35,000, and the median income for a family was $36,067. Males had a median income of $31,667 versus $20,508 for females. The per capita income for the township was $14,164. About 13.7% of families and 16.2% of the population were below the poverty line, including 18.0% of those under age 18 and 13.1% of those age 65 or over.
