= Newaygo County, Michigan =

County in Michigan, United States

- County
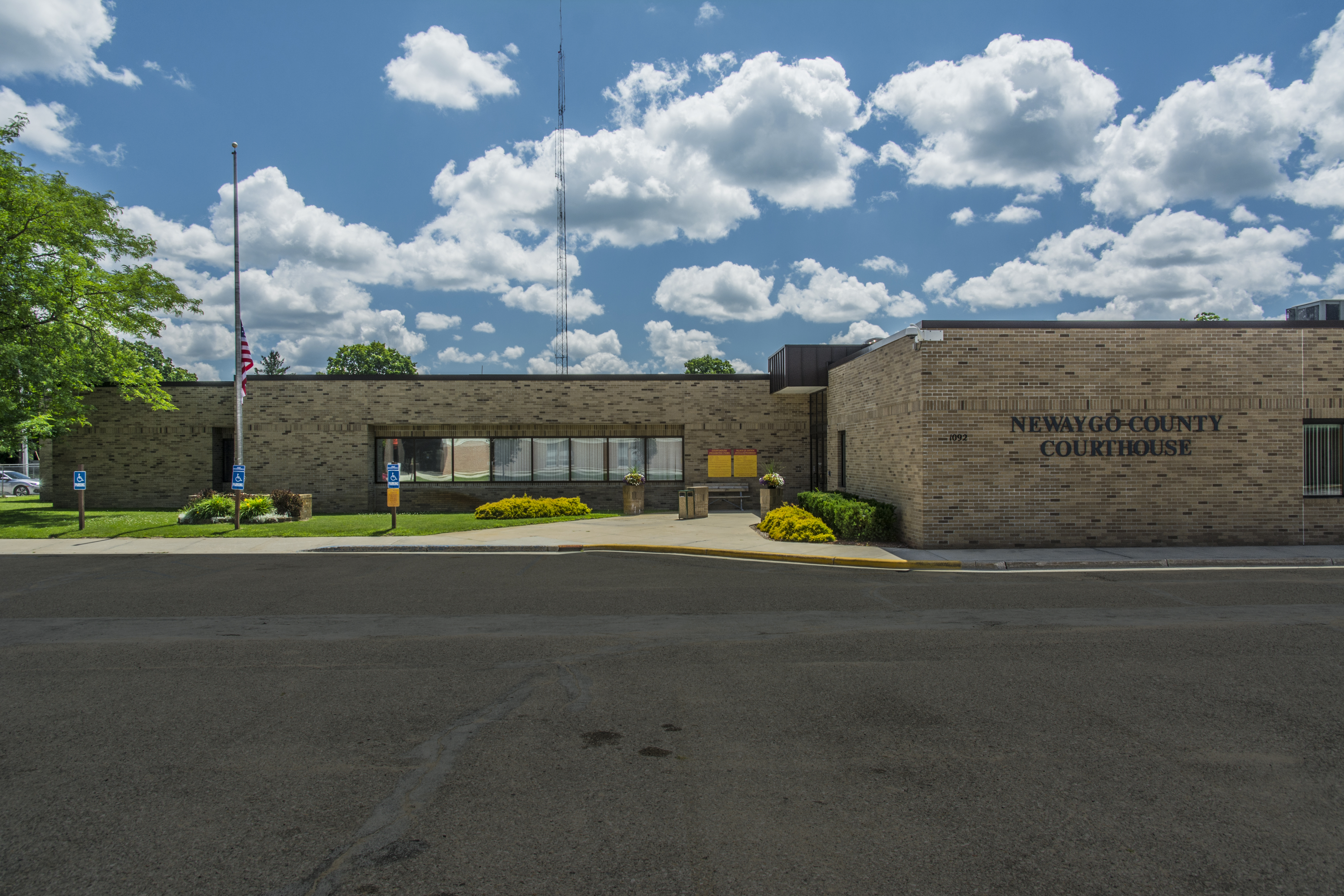
- Newaygo County Courthouse

- Seal

- Location within the U.S. state of Michigan
- Coordinates: 43°33′N 85°48′W
- Country: United States
- State: Michigan
- Established: 1840
- Organized: 1851
- Seat: White Cloud
- Largest city: Fremont

Area
  - Total: 862 sq mi (2,230 km^{2})
  - Land: 813 sq mi (2,110 km^{2})
  - Water: 48 sq mi (120 km^{2}) 5.6%

Population (2020)
  - Total: 49,978
  - Estimate (2025): 51,622 ▲
  - Density: 57/sq mi (22/km^{2})
- Time zone: UTC−5 (Eastern)
  - Summer (DST): UTC−4 (EDT)
- Congressional district: 2nd
- Website: newaygocountymi.gov

Newaygo County (/nəweɪɡoʊ/ nə-WAY-goh) is a county in the U.S. state of Michigan. As of the 2020 United States census, the population was 49,978. The county seat is White Cloud. The county was created in 1840, and was organized in 1851. It was either named for an Ojibwe leader who signed the Treaty of Saginaw in 1819 or for an Algonquian word meaning "much water".

== Geography ==
According to the US Census Bureau, the county has an area of 862 square miles (2,230 km^{2}), of which 813 square miles (2,110 km^{2}) is land and 48 square miles (120 km^{2}) (5.6%) is covered by water. The county is considered to be part of West Michigan.

The county has more than 230 natural lakes. The combined total length of all the county's rivers and streams exceeds 350 miles (560 km). Three large dams—Croton, Hardy, and Newaygo—were built at the beginning of the 20th century. The Hardy Dam is the largest earthen dam east of the Mississippi River. Over half of the county is in the Manistee National Forest.

=== Rivers ===
- Muskegon River
- Pere Marquette River
- Rogue River
- White River

=== Major highways ===
- M-20 runs east–west through center of county. Passes Hesperia, Aetna, and White Cloud.
- M-37 runs north–south through center of county. Passes Bitely, Brohman, White Cloud, Newaygo, Grant, and Ashland.
- M-82 runs east–west through southern part of county. Goes through Newaygo. Ends at county line tri-point of Muskegon, Oceana, and Newaygo Counties.
- M-120 runs the length of county's west line. Terminates in Hesperia.

=== County designated highways ===
- B-96

=== Adjacent counties ===
- Mason County – northwest
- Lake County – north
- Osceola County - northeast
- Mecosta County – east
- Montcalm County – southeast
- Kent County – south
- Muskegon County – southwest
- Oceana County – west

=== National protected area ===
- Manistee National Forest (part)

== Demographics ==
Historical population
Census	Pop.	Note	%±
1850	510		—
1860	2,760		441.2%
1870	7,294		164.3%
1880	14,688		101.4%
1890	20,476		39.4%
1900	17,673		−13.7%
1910	19,220		8.8%
1920	17,378		−9.6%
1930	17,029		−2.0%
1940	19,286		13.3%
1950	21,567		11.8%
1960	24,160		12.0%
1970	27,992		15.9%
1980	34,917		24.7%
1990	38,202		9.4%
2000	47,874		25.3%
2010	48,460		1.2%
2020	49,978		3.1%
2025 (est.)	51,622	▲	3.3%
US Decennial Census; 1790-1960 1900-1990; 1990-2000 2010-2018

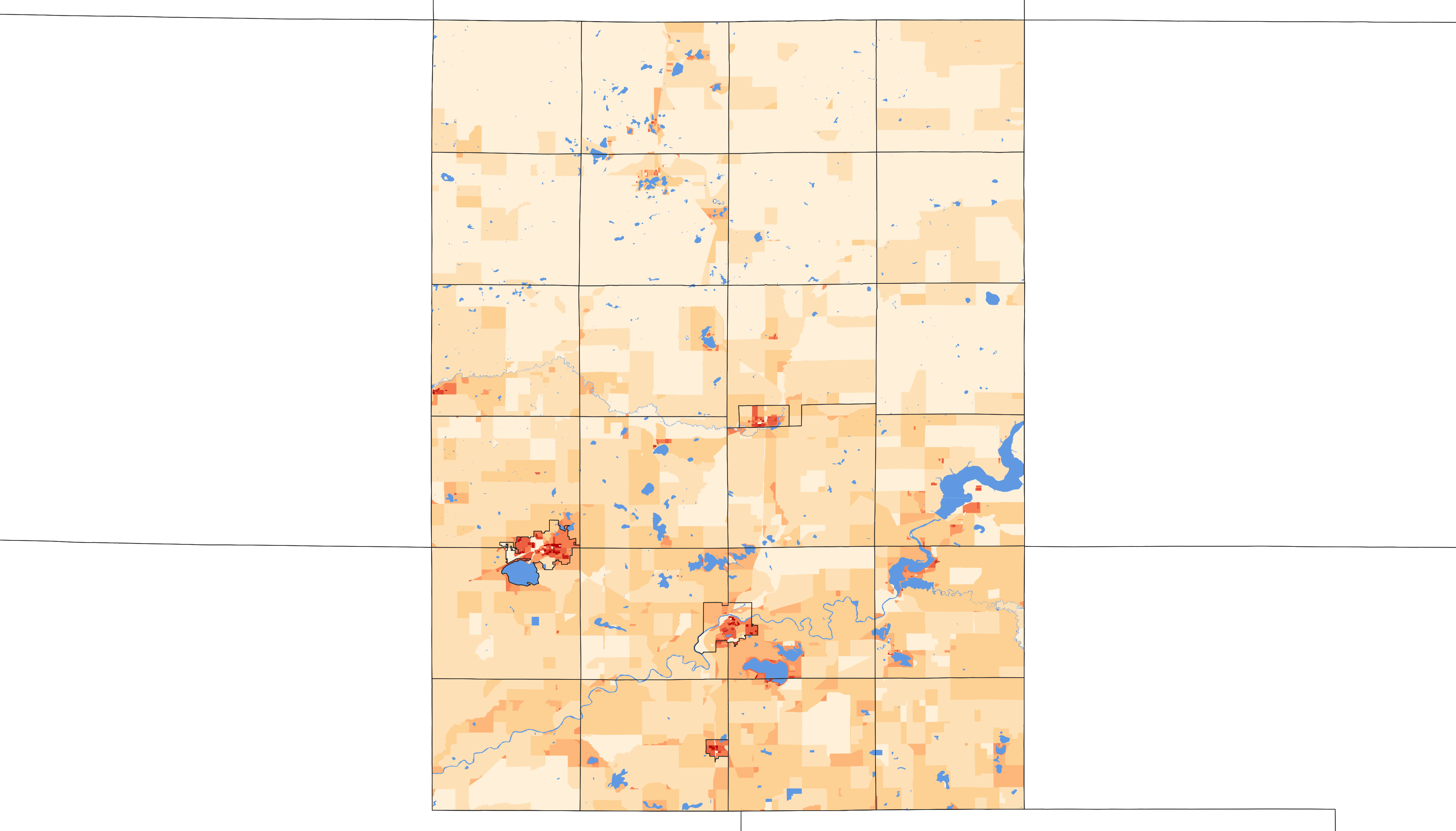
2020 population density of Newaygo County MI by census block

=== Racial and ethnic composition ===
Newaygo County, Michigan – Racial and ethnic composition Note: the US Census treats Hispanic/Latino as an ethnic category. This table excludes Latinos from the racial categories and assigns them to a separate category. Hispanics/Latinos may be of any race.
Race / Ethnicity (NH = Non-Hispanic)	Pop 1980	Pop 1990	Pop 2000	Pop 2010	Pop 2020	% 1980	% 1990	% 2000	% 2010	% 2020
White alone (NH)	33,469	36,433	44,508	44,119	43,915	95.85%	95.37%	92.97%	91.04%	87.87%
Black or African American alone (NH)	555	465	519	474	424	1.59%	1.22%	1.08%	0.98%	0.85%
Native American or Alaska Native alone (NH)	142	229	286	331	256	0.41%	0.60%	0.60%	0.68%	0.51%
Asian alone (NH)	59	91	138	184	189	0.17%	0.24%	0.29%	0.38%	0.38%
Native Hawaiian or Pacific Islander alone (NH)	x	x	10	11	14	x	x	0.02%	0.02%	0.03%
Other race alone (NH)	12	16	38	32	126	0.03%	0.04%	0.08%	0.07%	0.25%
Mixed race or Multiracial (NH)	x	x	530	646	2,085	x	x	1.11%	1.33%	4.17%
Hispanic or Latino (any race)	680	968	1,845	2,663	2,969	1.95%	2.53%	3.85%	5.50%	5.94%
Total	34,917	38,202	47,874	48,460	49,978	100.00%	100.00%	100.00%	100.00%	100.00%

=== 2020 census ===
As of the 2020 census, the county had a population of 49,978. The median age was 43.0 years. 22.5% of residents were under the age of 18 and 20.1% of residents were 65 years of age or older. For every 100 females there were 101.7 males, and for every 100 females age 18 and over there were 102.1 males age 18 and over.

The racial makeup of the county was 89.7% White, 0.9% Black or African American, 0.7% American Indian and Alaska Native, 0.4% Asian, <0.1% Native Hawaiian and Pacific Islander, 2.2% from some other race, and 6.1% from two or more races. Hispanic or Latino residents of any race comprised 5.9% of the population.

10.3% of residents lived in urban areas, while 89.7% lived in rural areas.

There were 19,414 households in the county, of which 28.4% had children under the age of 18 living in them. Of all households, 52.9% were married-couple households, 18.6% were households with a male householder and no spouse or partner present, and 20.8% were households with a female householder and no spouse or partner present. About 25.4% of all households were made up of individuals and 12.3% had someone living alone who was 65 years of age or older.

There were 24,542 housing units, of which 20.9% were vacant. Among occupied housing units, 83.3% were owner-occupied and 16.7% were renter-occupied. The homeowner vacancy rate was 1.3% and the rental vacancy rate was 5.4%.

=== 2010 census ===
According to the 2010 American Community Survey, 21.5% of residents were of English ancestry, 20.5% were of German ancestry, 14.4% were of Dutch ancestry, 8.1% were of Irish ancestry, and 5.0% were of Polish ancestry. 95.7% spoke English and 3.2% spoke Spanish as their first language.

=== 2000 census ===
As of the 2000 United States census, there were 47,874 people, 17,599 households, and 12,935 families in the county. The population density was 57 inhabitants per square mile (22/km^{2}). There were 23,202 housing units at an average density of 28 per square mile (11/km^{2}). The racial makeup of the county was 94.80% White, 1.12% Black or African American, 0.65% Native American, 0.29% Asian, 0.03% Pacific Islander, 1.63% from other races, and 1.48% from two or more races. 3.85% of the population were Hispanic or Latino of any race.

There were 17,599 households, out of which 35.20% had children under the age of 18 living with them, 60.20% were married couples living together, 9.00% had a female householder with no husband present, and 26.50% were non-families. 22.20% of all households were made up of individuals, and 9.00% had someone living alone who was 65 years of age or older. The average household size was 2.68 and the average family size was 3.13.

The county population contained 29.10% under the age of 18, 7.40% from 18 to 24, 27.50% from 25 to 44, 23.20% from 45 to 64, and 12.80% who were 65 years of age or older. The median age was 36 years. For every 100 females, there were 99.60 males. For every 100 females age 18 and over, there were 97.20 males.

The median income for a household in the county was $37,130, and the median income for a family was $42,498. Males had a median income of $35,549 versus $22,738 for females. The per capita income for the county was $16,976. About 9.00% of families and 11.60% of the population were below the poverty line, including 14.60% of those under age 18 and 8.50% of those age 65 or over.

=== Religion ===
- The Catholic church – 3,242 members
- The Christian Reformed Church in North America – 7 congregations and 2,056 members
- The United Methodist Church – 7 congregations and 1,600 members
- The Reformed Church in America – 3 congregations and 1,000 members
- The Church of Jesus Christ of Latter-day Saints - 1 meetinghouse in the county.
- The Seventh-day Adventist Church has only one church in Newaygo County.

Newaygo County is part of the Roman Catholic Diocese of Grand Rapids.

== Economy ==
Tourism is the most important economic activity in Newaygo County. Secondly is a blend of agricultural and small manufacturing. International baby food manufacturer Gerber Products Company is currently the county's largest employer with approximately 1,300 employees.

Newaygo County also has a large number of summer cottage residents. Fishermen can find many steelhead in the spring and salmon in the fall within the county's rivers and streams. Camping, hunting, cross country skiing, bicycling, birding and ORVing is common in the Manistee National Forest.

=== Notable companies ===
- County of Newaygo - White Cloud
- Dura Automotive Systems - Fremont
- Gerber Memorial Health Services - Fremont
- Gerber Products Company - Fremont
- Magna Donnelly - Newaygo
- North American Refractories - White Cloud
- Valspar Corporation - Fremont
- Wilbur Ellis - Grant
- Newaygo Brewing - Newaygo

== Government ==
Newaygo County has been strongly Republican since the Civil War era. Since 1884, the Republican Party nominee has carried the county vote in 92% of the national presidential elections (33 of 36). It has only supported a Democrat for president once in that time, in 1964. The Democrats have managed even 40 percent of the county's vote only five other times.

United States presidential election results for Newaygo County, Michigan
Year	Republican		Democratic		Third party(ies)	
Year	No.	%	No.	%	No.	%
1884	1,971	46.65%	2,051	48.54%	203	4.80%
1888	2,448	51.85%	1,932	40.92%	341	7.22%
1892	2,106	51.02%	1,531	37.09%	491	11.89%
1896	2,650	56.53%	1,943	41.45%	95	2.03%
1900	2,607	62.68%	1,424	34.24%	128	3.08%
1904	2,966	75.86%	790	20.20%	154	3.94%
1908	2,677	69.37%	956	24.77%	226	5.86%
1912	964	24.59%	776	19.80%	2,180	55.61%
1916	2,417	58.27%	1,625	39.18%	106	2.56%
1920	4,188	78.91%	929	17.51%	190	3.58%
1924	4,243	79.22%	720	13.44%	393	7.34%
1928	4,552	83.29%	888	16.25%	25	0.46%
1932	3,458	49.73%	3,275	47.10%	220	3.16%
1936	3,930	51.41%	3,288	43.01%	426	5.57%
1940	5,418	66.52%	2,693	33.06%	34	0.42%
1944	5,250	70.62%	2,156	29.00%	28	0.38%
1948	4,394	66.92%	2,027	30.87%	145	2.21%
1952	6,715	71.81%	2,541	27.17%	95	1.02%
1956	7,088	71.48%	2,808	28.32%	20	0.20%
1960	7,453	68.55%	3,404	31.31%	15	0.14%
1964	4,931	47.42%	5,457	52.48%	11	0.11%
1968	6,626	59.97%	3,369	30.49%	1,053	9.53%
1972	8,245	65.62%	3,978	31.66%	342	2.72%
1976	8,258	58.78%	5,622	40.01%	170	1.21%
1980	8,918	58.58%	5,236	34.40%	1,069	7.02%
1984	10,636	69.95%	4,496	29.57%	73	0.48%
1988	9,896	64.32%	5,389	35.03%	100	0.65%
1992	7,333	40.93%	6,455	36.03%	4,128	23.04%
1996	7,868	44.58%	7,614	43.14%	2,169	12.29%
2000	11,399	58.29%	7,677	39.25%	481	2.46%
2004	13,608	59.49%	9,057	39.60%	208	0.91%
2008	11,862	51.14%	10,790	46.52%	544	2.35%
2012	12,457	58.00%	8,728	40.64%	293	1.36%
2016	15,173	66.60%	6,212	27.27%	1,397	6.13%
2020	18,857	69.33%	7,873	28.95%	467	1.72%
2024	20,630	70.65%	8,131	27.84%	440	1.51%

United States Senate election results for Newaygo County, Michigan1
Year	Republican		Democratic		Third party(ies)	
Year	No.	%	No.	%	No.	%
2024	19,932	69.12%	8,066	27.97%	839	2.91%

Michigan Gubernatorial election results for Newaygo County
Year	Republican		Democratic		Third party(ies)	
Year	No.	%	No.	%	No.	%
2022	14,879	65.37%	7,417	32.59%	465	2.04%

Newaygo County operates the County jail, maintains rural roads, operates the major local courts, records deeds, mortgages, and vital records, administers public health regulations, and participates with the state in the provision of social services. The county board of commissioners controls the budget and has limited authority to make laws or ordinances. In Michigan, most local government functions – police and fire, building and zoning, tax assessment, street maintenance etc. – are the responsibility of individual cities and townships.

=== Elected officials ===
- Prosecuting Attorney: Worth Stay
- Sheriff: Robert "Bob" Mendham
- County Clerk: Jason VanderStelt
- County Treasurer: Jason O'Connell
- Register of Deeds: Stewart K. Sanders
- Drain Commissioner: Dale Twing

(information as of May 2023)

== Festivals and events ==
- Memorial Weekend Arts & Crafts Festival - Newaygo
- River Country Home & Garden Show - Newaygo Middle School
- Newaygo County Kids' Day - Downtown Newaygo
- Trail Town Celebration - Celebrating White Clouds Trails & Waterways
- City-Wide Yard Sales - Grant
- Harvest Celebration - Grant
- Harvest Festival - Fremont
- Logging Festival - Mid-Michigan Lumberjack Competition in Newaygo
- Bitely Homecoming - Bitely
- National Baby Food Festival - Fremont
- Pow Wow - White Cloud
- Santa Parade - Fremont
- West Michigan's Longest Yard Sale - Grant, Newaygo, White Cloud, Bitely
- Winterfest - Newaygo
- Christmas in Newaygo
- Christmas in Grant
- Christmas in White Cloud
- Newaygo County Agricultural Fair - Fremont

== Historic sites ==
In Newaygo County there are 16 locations that the State Historic Preservation Office has designated as historical. Two of the sixteen have been listed with the National Register of Historic Places:

- Big Prairie Grange Hall No. 935 - Goodwell Twp
- Birch Grove School - Lincoln Twp
- Croton Congregational Church - Croton Twp
- Croton Hydroelectric Plant - Croton Twp
- Ensley Windmill Tower
- First Christian Reformed Church (Demolished) - Fremont
- Gerber, Cornelius, Cottage - Sheridan Charter Twp
- Grant Depot and Water Tower - Grant
- Hardy Hydroelectric Plant - Big Prairie - Twp
- Lilley District No. 5 School - Lilley Twp
- Oak Grove District No. 3 Schoolhouse - Croton Twp
- Penoyer's Sawmill - Newaygo
- Saint Mark's Episcopal Church - Newaygo
- Weaver, Daniel, House - Denver Twp
- White Cloud Village Hall (Demolished) - White Cloud
- Woods, John F., Residence - Newaygo

== Communities ==
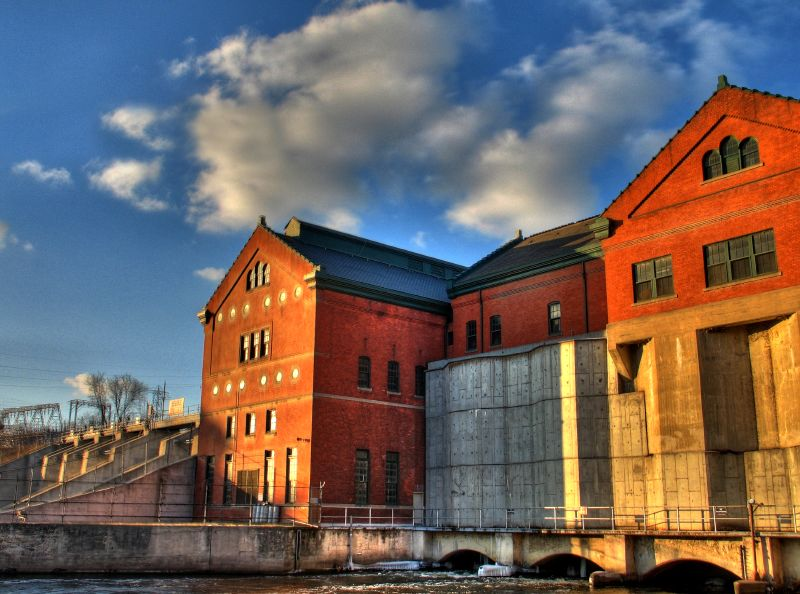
Croton Hydroelectric Plant

=== Cities ===
- Fremont
- Grant
- Newaygo
- White Cloud (county seat)

=== Village ===
- Hesperia (partially)

=== Unincorporated communities ===
- Aetna
- Big Prairie
- Bitely
- Brohman
- Brunswick (partially)
- Croton
- Ensley Center
- Lilley
- Riverview
- Woodland Park
- Woodville
- Wooster

=== Charter township ===
- Sheridan Charter Township

=== Civil townships ===
- Ashland Township
- Barton Township
- Beaver Township
- Big Prairie Township
- Bridgeton Township
- Brooks Township
- Croton Township
- Dayton Township
- Denver Township
- Ensley Township
- Everett Township
- Garfield Township
- Goodwell Township
- Grant Township
- Home Township
- Lilley Township
- Lincoln Township
- Merrill Township
- Monroe Township
- Norwich Township
- Sherman Township
- Troy Township
- Wilcox Township

== Education ==
The Newaygo County Regional Educational Service Agency, based in Fremont, services the districts in the county. The intermediate school district offers regional special education services and technical career programs for its students.

Newaygo County is served by the following regular public school districts:

- Big Jackson School District
- Fremont Public School District
- Grant Public Schools
- Hesperia Community Schools
- Newaygo Public Schools
- White Cloud Public Schools

Newaygo County has the following private schools:

- Cornerstone Christian Academy
- Fremont Christian School
- Grant Christian School

== See also ==
- List of Michigan State Historic Sites in Newaygo County
- National Register of Historic Places listings in Newaygo County
