= Newaygo, Michigan =

- City
- Location of Newaygo, Michigan
- Coordinates: 43°25′1″N 85°47′55″W
- Country: United States
- State: Michigan
- County: Newaygo

Area
  - Total: 3.92 sq mi (10.16 km^{2})
  - Land: 3.76 sq mi (9.75 km^{2})
  - Water: 0.15 sq mi (0.40 km^{2})
- Elevation: 692 ft (211 m)

Population (2020)
  - Total: 2,471
  - Density: 656.2/sq mi (253.35/km^{2})
- Time zone: UTC-5 (Eastern (EST))
  - Summer (DST): UTC-4 (EDT)
- ZIP code: 49337
- Area code: 231
- FIPS code: 26-57080
- GNIS feature ID: 1621003
- Website: newaygo.gov

Newaygo (/nəweɪɡoʊ/ nə-WAY-goh) is a rural city in Newaygo County in the U.S. state of Michigan. The population was 2,471 at the 2020 census.

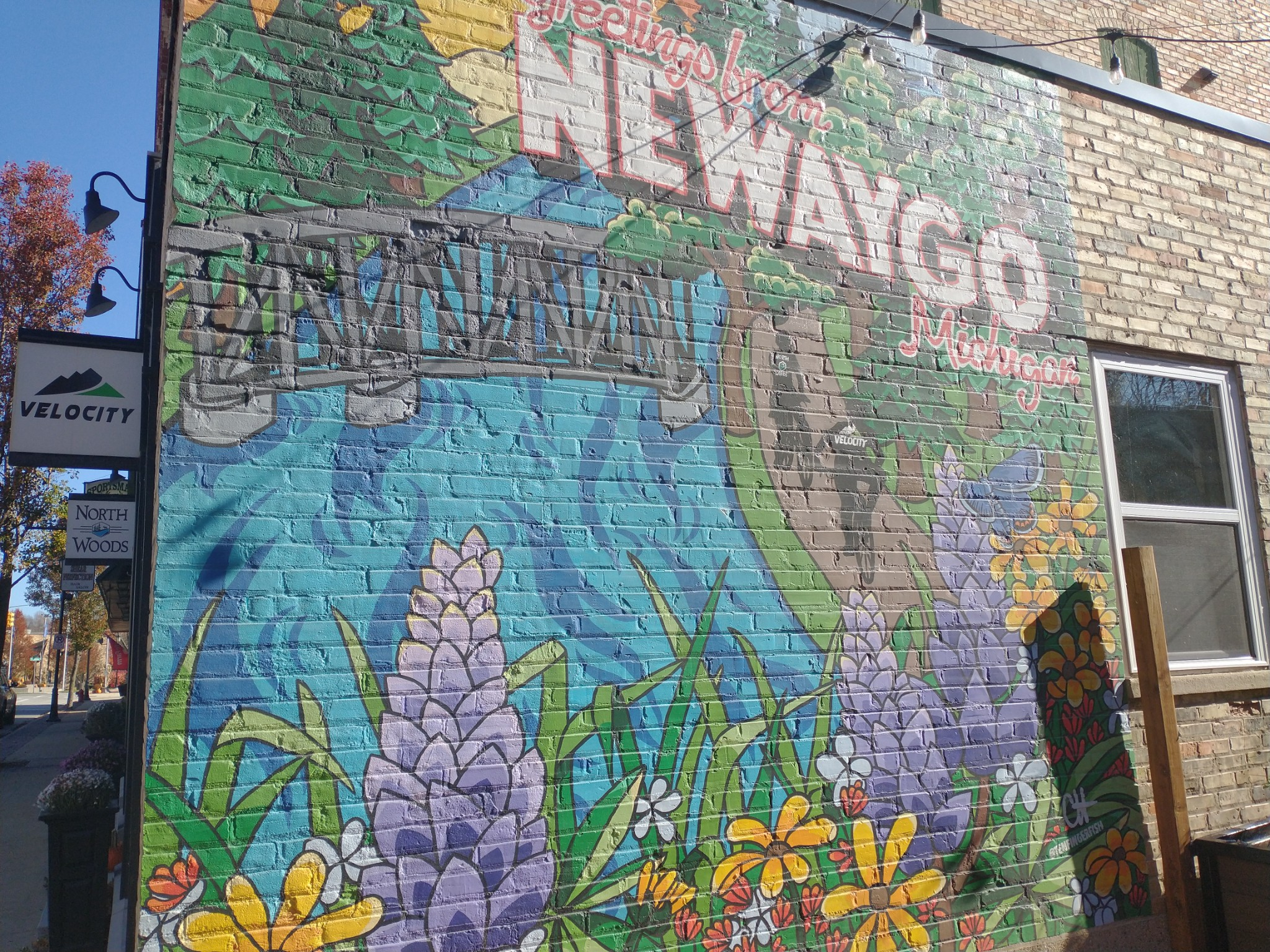
A mural in downtown Newaygo

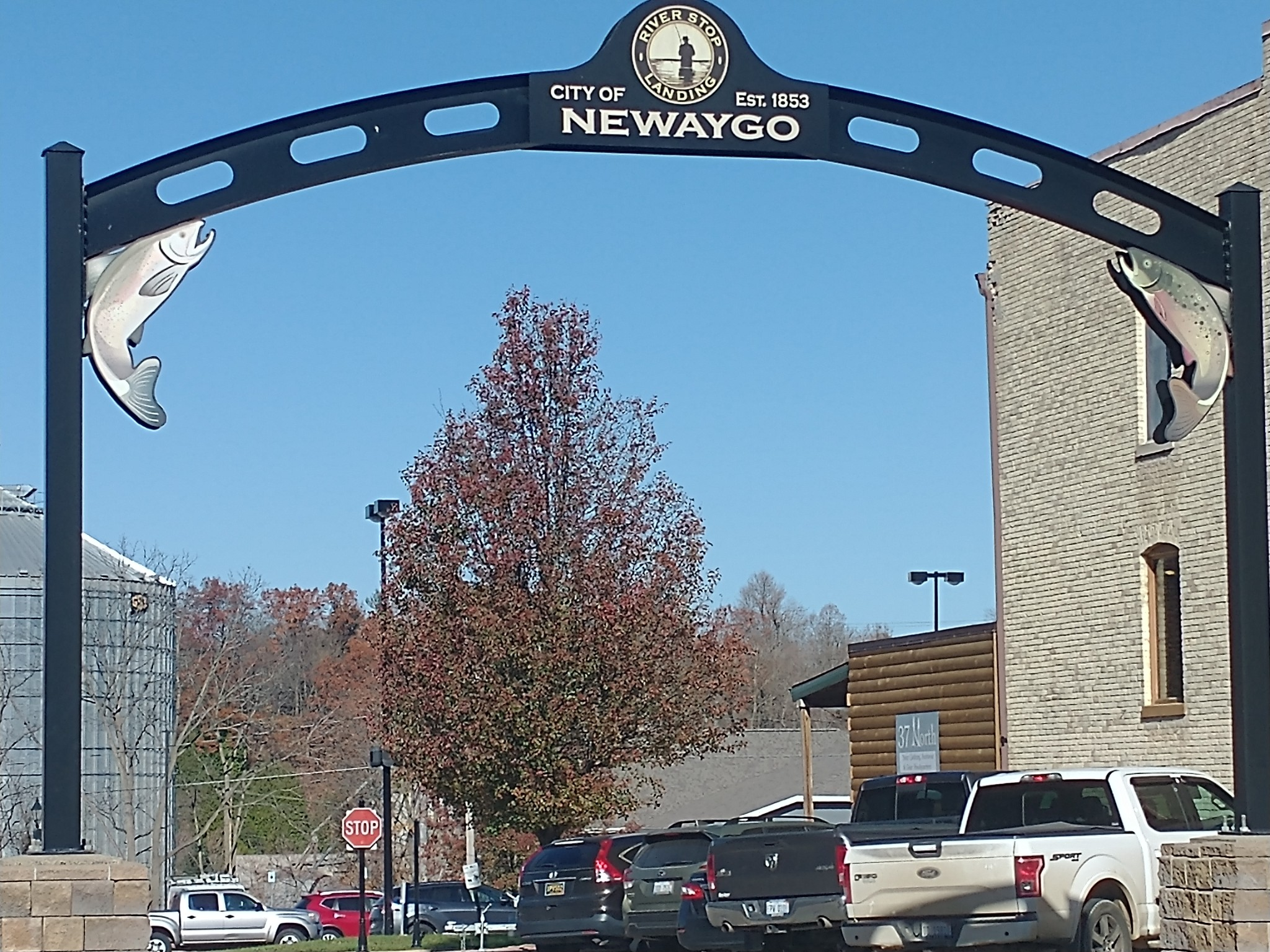
An archway in Newaygo

== Geography ==
According to the United States Census Bureau, the city has a total area of 3.90 square miles (10.10 km^{2}), of which 3.74 square miles (9.69 km^{2}) is land and 0.16 square miles (0.41 km^{2}) is water. including the Muskegon River, which runs through the town and is often used for canoe trips, tubing, and fishing. The county is considered part of West Michigan. Newaygo is part of the Roman Catholic Diocese of Grand Rapids.

=== Geographic features ===
The Muskegon River flows through the north side of the town beneath M-37 and a train bridge.

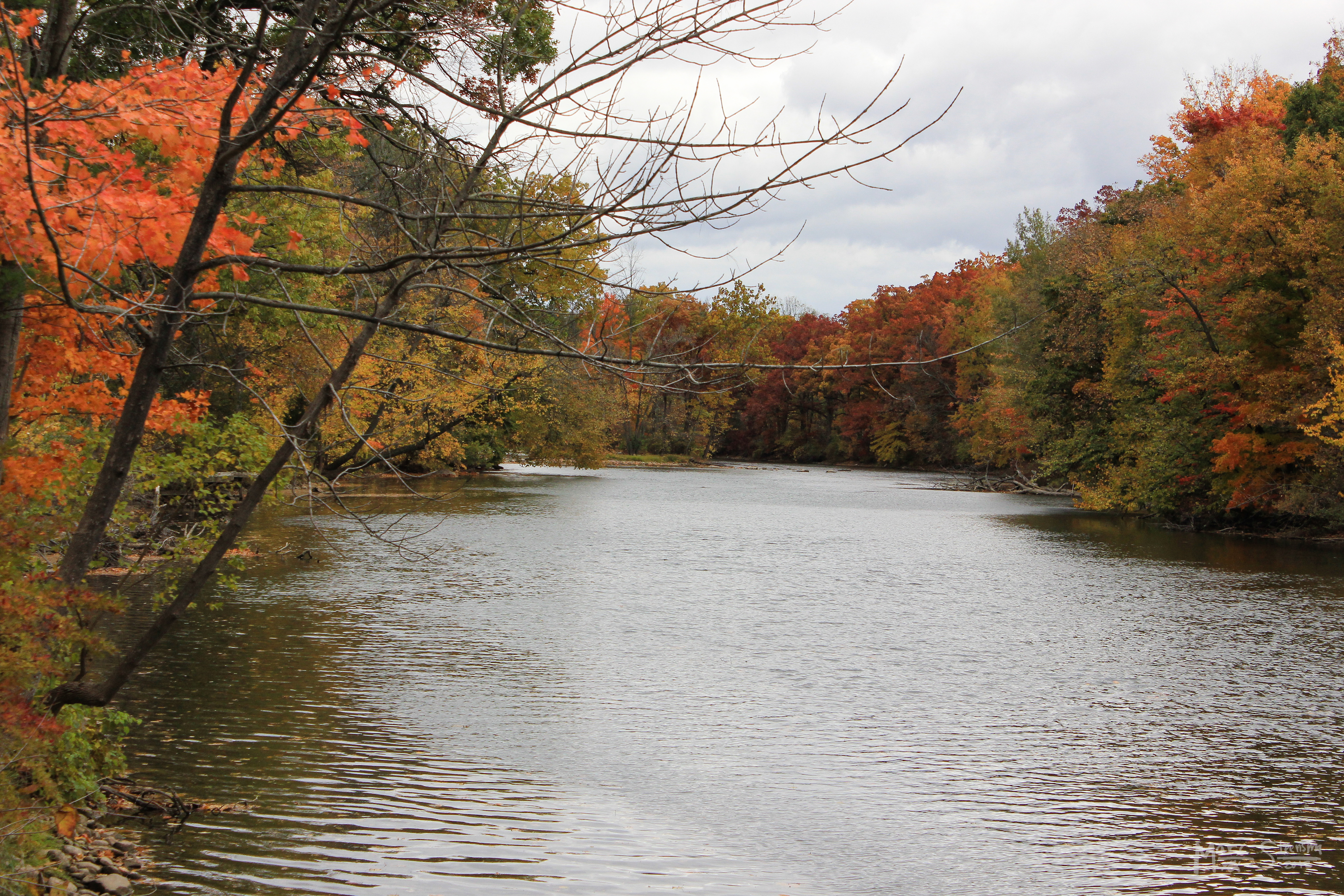
The Muskegon River flowing near Newaygo

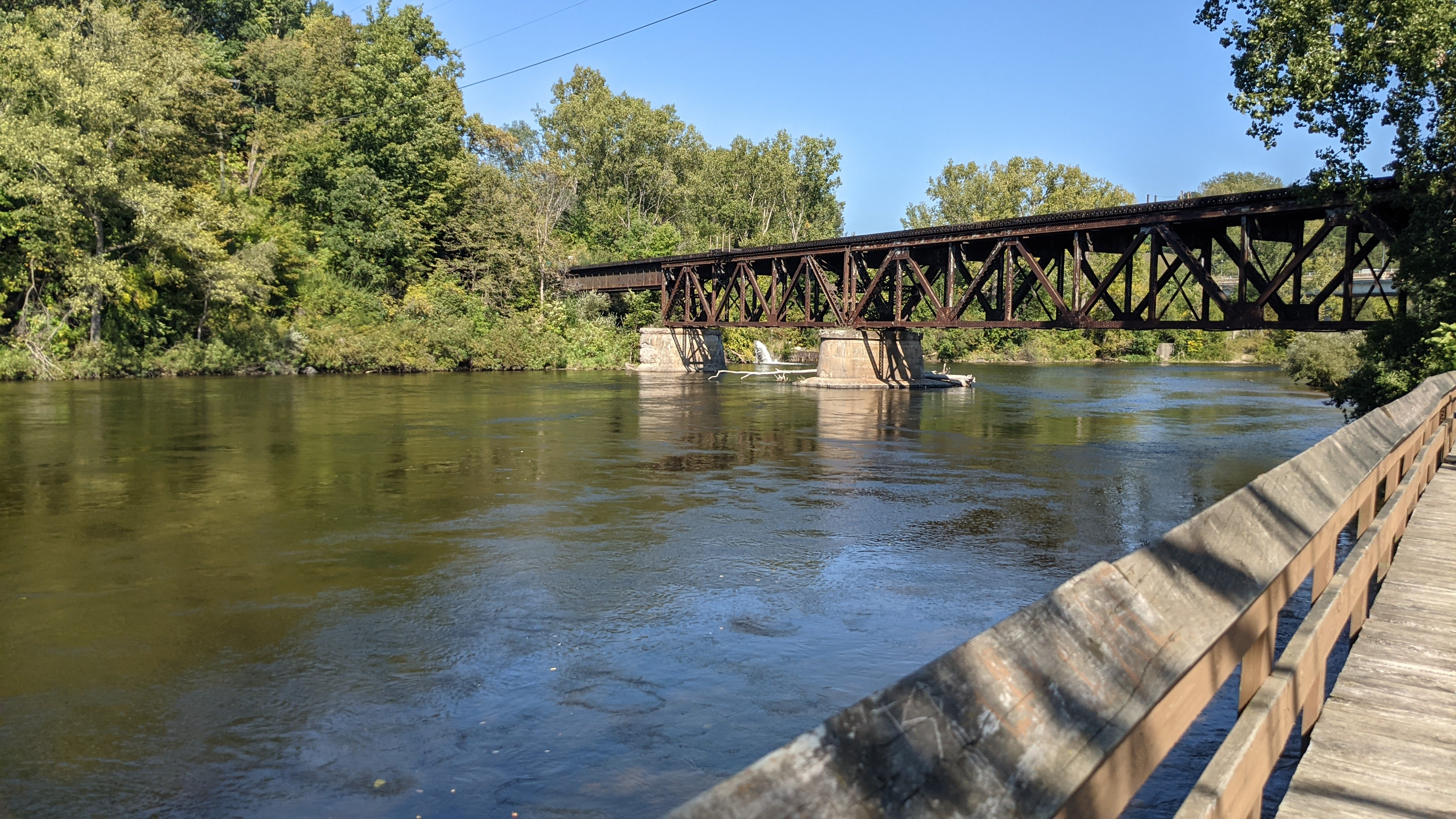
Train bridge in Newaygo

=== Major highways ===
- M-37
- M-82

== History ==
Newaygo's recorded history goes back to the 1600s and the French coureur des bois (independent trappers) and, later, fur company voyageurs that travelled by canoe via the Muskegon River. It was ostensibly named after Chief Nuwagon, an Ojibwe leader who signed the Treaty of Saginaw in 1819, or for an Algonquian word meaning "much water". John Brooks came to harvest lumber in 1836, and was the town's first postmaster in 1847. Proximity to the river made it a center for floating logs to the mills in Muskegon during the lumber boom of the late 1800s.

== Demographics ==
Historical population
Census	Pop.	Note	%±
1870	703		—
1880	1,097		56.0%
1890	1,330		21.2%
1900	1,172		−11.9%
1910	1,207		3.0%
1920	1,160		−3.9%
1930	1,227		5.8%
1940	1,282		4.5%
1950	1,385		8.0%
1960	1,447		4.5%
1970	1,381		−4.6%
1980	1,271		−8.0%
1990	1,336		5.1%
2000	1,670		25.0%
2010	1,976		18.3%
2020	2,471		25.1%
U.S. Decennial Census

=== 2020 census ===
As of the 2020 census, Newaygo had a population of 2,471. The median age was 33.8 years. 26.1% of residents were under the age of 18 and 17.1% of residents were 65 years of age or older. For every 100 females there were 88.8 males, and for every 100 females age 18 and over there were 86.2 males age 18 and over.

0.0% of residents lived in urban areas, while 100.0% lived in rural areas.

There were 951 households in Newaygo, of which 33.5% had children under the age of 18 living in them. Of all households, 38.2% were married-couple households, 17.2% were households with a male householder and no spouse or partner present, and 35.9% were households with a female householder and no spouse or partner present. About 32.4% of all households were made up of individuals and 16.1% had someone living alone who was 65 years of age or older.

There were 1,039 housing units, of which 8.5% were vacant. The homeowner vacancy rate was 1.4% and the rental vacancy rate was 2.9%.

Racial composition as of the 2020 census
Race	Number	Percent
White	2,186	88.5%
Black or African American	13	0.5%
American Indian and Alaska Native	28	1.1%
Asian	15	0.6%
Native Hawaiian and Other Pacific Islander	1	0.0%
Some other race	62	2.5%
Two or more races	166	6.7%
Hispanic or Latino (of any race)	215	8.7%

=== 2010 census ===
As of the census of 2010, there were 1,976 people, 786 households, and 502 families living in the city. The population density was 528.3 inhabitants per square mile (204.0/km^{2}). There were 892 housing units at an average density of 238.5 per square mile (92.1/km^{2}). The racial makeup of the city was 93.6% White, 0.9% African American, 1.2% Native American, 0.7% Asian, 0.1% Pacific Islander, 1.6% from other races, and 2.0% from two or more races. Hispanic or Latino of any race were 7.3% of the population.

There were 786 households, of which 36.8% had children under the age of 18 living with them, 39.7% were married couples living together, 20.2% had a female householder with no husband present, 3.9% had a male householder with no wife present, and 36.1% were non-families. 30.7% of all households were made up of individuals, and 14.7% had someone living alone who was 65 years of age or older. The average household size was 2.51 and the average family size was 3.10.

The median age in the city was 32.4 years. 29.3% of residents were under the age of 18; 10.5% were between the ages of 18 and 24; 24.7% were from 25 to 44; 21.3% were from 45 to 64; and 14.2% were 65 years of age or older. The gender makeup of the city was 46.1% male and 53.9% female.

=== 2000 census ===
As of the census of 2000, there were 1,670 people, 620 households, and 450 families living in the city. The population density was 501.2 inhabitants per square mile (193.5/km^{2}). There were 707 housing units at an average density of 212.2 per square mile (81.9/km^{2}). The racial makeup of the city was 95.87% White, 0.24% African American, 0.24% Native American, 0.12% Asian, 2.34% from other races, and 1.20% from two or more races. Hispanic or Latino of any race were 4.79% of the population.

There were 620 households, out of which 41.6% had children under the age of 18 living with them, 50.8% were married couples living together, 17.9% had a female householder with no husband present, and 27.4% were non-families. 23.7% of all households were made up of individuals, and 7.7% had someone living alone who was 65 years of age or older. The average household size was 2.69 and the average family size was 3.16.

In the city, the population was spread out, with 33.1% under the age of 18, 10.7% from 18 to 24, 26.1% from 25 to 44, 18.6% from 45 to 64, and 11.5% who were 65 years of age or older. The median age was 30 years. For every 100 females, there were 89.1 males. For every 100 females age 18 and over, there were 84.9 males.

The median income for a household in the city was $32,273, and the median income for a family was $36,023. Males had a median income of $32,763 versus $21,385 for females. The per capita income for the city was $14,643. About 15.2% of families and 16.5% of the population were below the poverty line, including 22.5% of those under age 18 and 6.3% of those age 65 or over.

== Climate ==
The Köppen Climate Classification subtype for this climate is "Dfb". (Warm Summer Continental Climate).

== Notable people ==
- Ella H. Brockway Avann (born 1853), educator
- Roy Bargy, composer and pianist
- Joe Berger, lineman with the Minnesota Vikings of the NFL
- Jack Nitzsche, musician and arranger
- Bertha Yerex Whitman, architect
