= Wilcox Township, Michigan =

- Township
- Location within the state of Michigan Wilcox Township, Michigan (the United States)
- Coordinates: 43°36′33″N 85°44′51″W
- Country: United States
- State: Michigan
- County: Newaygo

Area
  - Total: 34.0 sq mi (88.0 km^{2})
  - Land: 33.9 sq mi (87.8 km^{2})
  - Water: 0.077 sq mi (0.2 km^{2})
- Elevation: 879 ft (268 m)

Population (2020)
  - Total: 1,133
  - Density: 33.4/sq mi (12.9/km^{2})
- Time zone: UTC-5 (Eastern (EST))
  - Summer (DST): UTC-4 (EDT)
- FIPS code: 26-87200
- GNIS feature ID: 1627272

Wilcox Township is a civil township of Newaygo County in the U.S. state of Michigan. The population was 1,133 at the 2020 census.

== Geography ==
According to the United States Census Bureau, the township has a total area of 34.0 square miles (88 km^{2}), of which 33.9 square miles (88 km^{2}) is land and 0.1 square miles (0.26 km^{2}) (0.26%) is water.

== Demographics ==
As of the census of 2000, there were 1,145 people, 408 households, and 308 families residing in the township. The population density was 33.8 inhabitants per square mile (13.1/km^{2}). There were 577 housing units at an average density of 17.0 per square mile (6.6/km^{2}). The racial makeup of the township was 93.62% White, 2.01% African American, 1.57% Native American, 0.09% Asian, 0.79% from other races, and 1.92% from two or more races. Hispanic or Latino of any race were 1.66% of the population.

There were 408 households, out of which 39.5% had children under the age of 18 living with them, 57.1% were married couples living together, 9.8% had a female householder with no husband present, and 24.5% were non-families. 19.9% of all households were made up of individuals, and 8.1% had someone living alone who was 65 years of age or older. The average household size was 2.81 and the average family size was 3.18.

In the township the population was spread out, with 31.3% under the age of 18, 6.6% from 18 to 24, 29.3% from 25 to 44, 22.9% from 45 to 64, and 10.0% who were 65 years of age or older. The median age was 35 years. For every 100 females, there were 106.7 males. For every 100 females age 18 and over, there were 106.6 males.

The median income for a household in the township was $32,039, and the median income for a family was $35,250. Males had a median income of $32,143 versus $20,950 for females. The per capita income for the township was $13,564. About 14.1% of families and 18.1% of the population were below the poverty line, including 19.4% of those under age 18 and 11.5% of those age 65 or over.
