= Sherman Township, Newaygo County, Michigan =

Sherman Township, Michigan
- Township
- Location within the state of Michigan Sherman Township, Michigan (the United States)
- Coordinates: 43°31′1″N 85°51′49″W
- Country: United States
- State: Michigan
- County: Newaygo

Area
  - Total: 35.8 sq mi (92.8 km^{2})
  - Land: 34.6 sq mi (89.7 km^{2})
  - Water: 1.2 sq mi (3.2 km^{2})
- Elevation: 863 ft (263 m)

Population (2020)
  - Total: 2,105
  - Density: 60.8/sq mi (23.5/km^{2})
- Time zone: UTC-5 (Eastern (EST))
  - Summer (DST): UTC-4 (EDT)
- FIPS code: 26-73260
- GNIS feature ID: 1627076
- Website: https://shermantownship.org/

Sherman Township is a civil township of Newaygo County in the U.S. state of Michigan. The population was 2,105 at the 2020 census.

== Geography ==
According to the United States Census Bureau, the township has a total area of 35.8 square miles (92.8 km^{2}), of which 34.6 square miles (89.7 km^{2}) is land and 1.2 square miles (3.2 km^{2}) (3.40%) is water.

== Demographics ==
As of the census of 2000, there were 2,159 people, 749 households, and 558 families residing in the township. The population density was 62.4 inhabitants per square mile (24.1/km^{2}). There were 997 housing units at an average density of 28.8 per square mile (11.1/km^{2}). The racial makeup of the township was 96.85% White, 0.60% African American, 0.97% Native American, 0.74% from other races, and 0.83% from two or more races. Hispanic or Latino of any race were 2.08% of the population.

There were 749 households, out of which 34.0% had children under the age of 18 living with them, 62.3% were married couples living together, 8.1% had a female householder with no husband present, and 25.5% were non-families. 21.9% of all households were made up of individuals, and 9.1% had someone living alone who was 65 years of age or older. The average household size was 2.71 and the average family size was 3.14.

In the township the population was spread out, with 27.2% under the age of 18, 7.3% from 18 to 24, 24.3% from 25 to 44, 23.7% from 45 to 64, and 17.5% who were 65 years of age or older. The median age was 39 years. For every 100 females, there were 89.4 males. For every 100 females age 18 and over, there were 87.8 males.

The median income for a household in the township was $40,163, and the median income for a family was $46,736. Males had a median income of $37,063 versus $22,500 for females. The per capita income for the township was $16,195. About 7.6% of families and 10.2% of the population were below the poverty line, including 12.2% of those under age 18 and 3.7% of those age 65 or over.
