= Monroe Township, Michigan =

- Civil township
- Location within the state of Michigan Monroe Township, Michigan (the United States)
- Coordinates: 43°41′37″N 85°43′51″W
- Country: United States
- State: Michigan
- County: Newaygo

Area
  - Total: 36.0 sq mi (93.3 km^{2})
  - Land: 35.8 sq mi (92.8 km^{2})
  - Water: 0.15 sq mi (0.4 km^{2})
- Elevation: 915 ft (279 m)

Population (2020)
  - Total: 328
  - Density: 9.15/sq mi (3.53/km^{2})
- Time zone: UTC-5 (Eastern (EST))
  - Summer (DST): UTC-4 (EDT)
- FIPS code: 26-55060
- GNIS feature ID: 1626756
- Website: http://www.monroemitwp.com/

Monroe Township is a civil township of Newaygo County in the U.S. state of Michigan. As of the 2020 census, the township population was 328.

== Geography ==
According to the United States Census Bureau, the township has a total area of 36.0 square miles (93 km^{2}), of which 35.8 square miles (93 km^{2}) is land and 0.2 square miles (0.52 km^{2}) (0.47%) is water.

== Demographics ==
As of the census of 2000, there were 324 people, 133 households, and 94 families residing in the township. The population density was 9.0 per square mile (3.5/km^{2}). There were 289 housing units at an average density of 8.1 per square mile (3.1/km^{2}). The racial makeup of the township was 95.37% White, 1.54% African American, 0.31% Native American, and 2.78% from two or more races. Hispanic or Latino of any race were 0.62% of the population.

There were 133 households, out of which 27.8% had children under the age of 18 living with them, 60.2% were married couples living together, 5.3% had a female householder with no husband present, and 29.3% were non-families. 23.3% of all households were made up of individuals, and 10.5% had someone living alone who was 65 years of age or older. The average household size was 2.44 and the average family size was 2.87.

In the township the population was spread out, with 25.3% under the age of 18, 5.2% from 18 to 24, 24.1% from 25 to 44, 27.5% from 45 to 64, and 17.9% who were 65 years of age or older. The median age was 43 years. For every 100 females, there were 101.2 males. For every 100 females age 18 and over, there were 108.6 males.

The median income for a household in the township was $30,156, and the median income for a family was $33,750. Males had a median income of $32,083 versus $20,000 for females. The per capita income for the township was $16,214. About 10.0% of families and 11.3% of the population were below the poverty line, including 14.7% of those under age 18 and 10.5% of those age 65 or over.
