= Norwich Township, Newaygo County, Michigan =

Norwich Township, Michigan
- Township
- Location within the state of Michigan Norwich Township, Michigan (the United States)
- Coordinates: 43°41′31″N 85°37′16″W
- Country: United States
- State: Michigan
- County: Newaygo

Area
  - Total: 35.4 sq mi (91.8 km^{2})
  - Land: 35.3 sq mi (91.3 km^{2})
  - Water: 0.19 sq mi (0.5 km^{2})
- Elevation: 1,053 ft (321 m)

Population (2020)
  - Total: 547
  - Density: 15.5/sq mi (5.99/km^{2})
- Time zone: UTC-5 (Eastern (EST))
  - Summer (DST): UTC-4 (EDT)
- FIPS code: 26-59300
- GNIS feature ID: 1626824
- Website: https://norwichtwp.org/

Norwich Township is a civil township of Newaygo County in the U.S. state of Michigan. The population was 547 at the 2020 census.

== Geography ==
According to the United States Census Bureau, the township has a total area of 35.4 square miles (91.8 km^{2}), of which 35.2 square miles (91.3 km^{2}) is land and 0.2 square mile (0.5 km^{2}) (0.51%) is water.

== Demographics ==
As of the census of 2000, there were 557 people, 191 households, and 157 families residing in the township. The population density was 15.8 per square mile (6.1/km^{2}). There were 235 housing units at an average density of 6.7 per square mile (2.6/km^{2}). The racial makeup of the township was 97.13% White, 0.72% African American, 0.36% Native American, 0.18% Asian, 0.72% Pacific Islander, 0.18% from other races, and 0.72% from two or more races. Hispanic or Latino of any race were 0.90% of the population.

There were 191 households, out of which 34.0% had children under the age of 18 living with them, 67.5% were married couples living together, 9.9% had a female householder with no husband present, and 17.3% were non-families. 12.0% of all households were made up of individuals, and 5.2% had someone living alone who was 65 years of age or older. The average household size was 2.92 and the average family size was 3.10.

In the township the population was spread out, with 27.3% under the age of 18, 11.1% from 18 to 24, 24.4% from 25 to 44, 27.8% from 45 to 64, and 9.3% who were 65 years of age or older. The median age was 37 years. For every 100 females, there were 104.0 males. For every 100 females age 18 and over, there were 103.5 males.

The median income for a household in the township was $36,250, and the median income for a family was $39,688. Males had a median income of $32,031 versus $23,889 for females. The per capita income for the township was $17,054. About 7.0% of families and 13.8% of the population were below the poverty line, including 17.5% of those under age 18 and 7.7% of those age 65 or over.
