= Dayton Township, Newaygo County, Michigan =

Dayton Township, Michigan
- Township
- Location within the state of Michigan Dayton Township, Michigan (the United States)
- Coordinates: 43°30′12″N 85°59′22″W
- Country: United States
- State: Michigan
- County: Newaygo

Area
  - Total: 34.2 sq mi (88.5 km^{2})
  - Land: 33.8 sq mi (87.6 km^{2})
  - Water: 0.39 sq mi (1.0 km^{2})
- Elevation: 856 ft (261 m)

Population (2020)
  - Total: 1,994
  - Density: 59.0/sq mi (22.8/km^{2})
- Time zone: UTC-5 (Eastern (EST))
  - Summer (DST): UTC-4 (EDT)
- FIPS code: 26-19960
- GNIS feature ID: 1626162

Dayton Township is a civil township of west central Newaygo County in the U.S. state of Michigan. The population was 1,994 at the 2020 census.

The City of Fremont is located partially within the township and is the only incorporated municipality.

Dayton Center is an unincorporated community located just a few miles north and west of Fremont at 43°30′38″N 85°58′48″W.

== Geography ==
According to the United States Census Bureau, the township has a total area of 34.2 square miles (88.5 km^{2}), of which 33.8 square miles (87.6 km^{2}) is land and 0.4 square mile (1.0 km^{2}) (1.08%) is water.

== Demographics ==
As of the census of 2000, there were 2,002 people, 687 households, and 564 families residing in the township. The population density was 59.2 inhabitants per square mile (22.9/km^{2}). There were 739 housing units at an average density of 21.9 per square mile (8.5/km^{2}). The racial makeup of the township was 96.50% White, 0.80% African American, 0.25% Native American, 0.65% Asian, 0.95% from other races, and 0.85% from two or more races. Hispanic or Latino of any race were 2.05% of the population.

There were 687 households, out of which 37.6% had children under the age of 18 living with them, 75.0% were married couples living together, 5.7% had a female householder with no husband present, and 17.9% were non-families. 15.9% of all households were made up of individuals, and 6.3% had someone living alone who was 65 years of age or older. The average household size was 2.89 and the average family size was 3.22.

In the township the population was spread out, with 29.7% under the age of 18, 7.5% from 18 to 24, 26.2% from 25 to 44, 25.7% from 45 to 64, and 10.9% who were 65 years of age or older. The median age was 38 years. For every 100 females, there were 103.2 males. For every 100 females age 18 and over, there were 98.7 males.

The median income for a household in the township was $44,770, and the median income for a family was $51,771. Males had a median income of $37,188 versus $26,111 for females. The per capita income for the township was $19,433. About 3.6% of families and 8.5% of the population were below the poverty line, including 12.2% of those under age 18 and 4.0% of those age 65 or over.
