= Big Prairie Township, Michigan =

- Township
- Location within the state of Michigan Big Prairie Township, Michigan (the United States)
- Coordinates: 43°30′43″N 85°37′42″W
- Country: United States
- State: Michigan
- County: Newaygo

Area
  - Total: 36.2 sq mi (93.8 km^{2})
  - Land: 31.5 sq mi (81.6 km^{2})
  - Water: 4.7 sq mi (12.2 km^{2})
- Elevation: 912 ft (278 m)

Population (2020)
  - Total: 2,436
  - Density: 77.3/sq mi (29.9/km^{2})
- Time zone: UTC-5 (Eastern (EST))
  - Summer (DST): UTC-4 (EDT)
- FIPS code: 26-08280
- GNIS feature ID: 1625933

Big Prairie Township is a civil township of Newaygo County in the U.S. state of Michigan. As of the 2020 census, the township population was 2,436.

== History ==
Big Prairie Township was organized in 1852.

== Geography ==
The Hardy Dam on the Muskegon River is located in the township.

According to the United States Census Bureau, the township has a total area of 36.2 square miles (94 km^{2}), of which 31.5 square miles (82 km^{2}) is land and 4.7 square miles (12 km^{2}) (13.03%) is water.

== Demographics ==
As of the census of 2000, there were 2,465 people, 980 households, and 677 families residing in the township. The population density was 78.2 inhabitants per square mile (30.2/km^{2}). There were 1,474 housing units at an average density of 46.8 per square mile (18.1/km^{2}). The racial makeup of the township was 96.59% White, 0.45% African American, 0.57% Native American, 0.20% Asian, 0.04% Pacific Islander, 0.69% from other races, and 1.46% from two or more races. Hispanic or Latino of any race were 1.74% of the population.

There were 980 households, out of which 31.3% had children under the age of 18 living with them, 55.3% were married couples living together, 7.7% had a female householder with no husband present, and 30.9% were non-families. 23.7% of all households were made up of individuals, and 9.0% had someone living alone who was 65 years of age or older. The average household size was 2.52 and the average family size was 2.97.

In the township the population was spread out, with 26.6% under the age of 18, 6.8% from 18 to 24, 27.8% from 25 to 44, 25.8% from 45 to 64, and 13.0% who were 65 years of age or older. The median age was 38 years. For every 100 females, there were 111.2 males. For every 100 females age 18 and over, there were 108.0 males.

The median income for a household in the township was $32,879, and the median income for a family was $36,935. Males had a median income of $33,309 versus $21,667 for females. The per capita income for the township was $14,900. About 9.8% of families and 12.2% of the population were below the poverty line, including 9.6% of those under age 18 and 20.9% of those age 65 or over.
