= White Cloud, Michigan =

- City
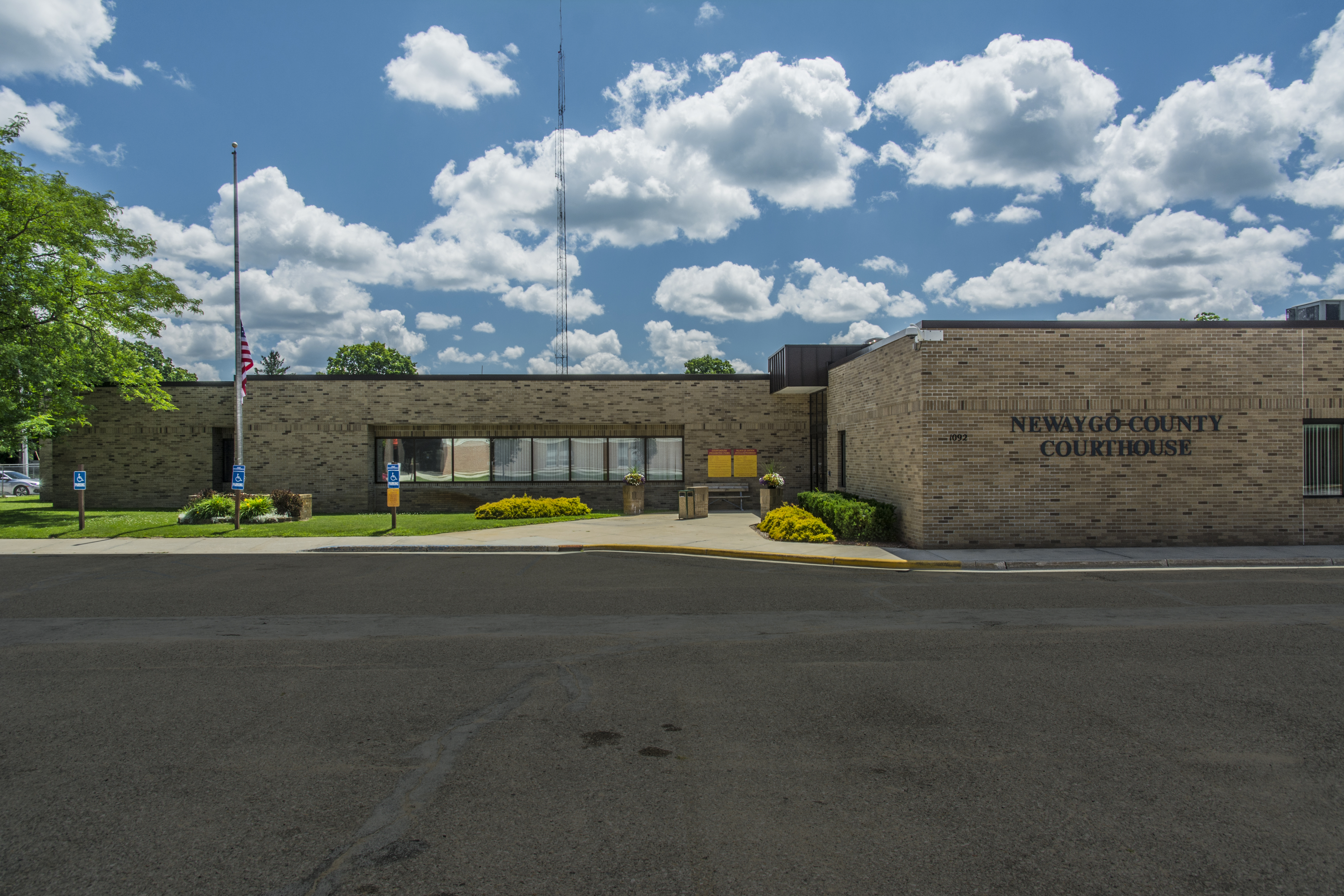
- Newaygo County Courthouse

- Location of White Cloud, Michigan
- Coordinates: 43°33′4″N 85°46′21″W
- Country: United States
- State: Michigan
- County: Newaygo

Area
  - Total: 1.99 sq mi (5.15 km^{2})
  - Land: 1.93 sq mi (5.01 km^{2})
  - Water: 0.054 sq mi (0.14 km^{2})
- Elevation: 873 ft (266 m)

Population (2020)
  - Total: 1,479
  - Density: 765.0/sq mi (295.38/km^{2})
- Time zone: UTC-5 (Eastern (EST))
  - Summer (DST): UTC-4 (EDT)
- ZIP code: 49349
- Area code: 231
- FIPS code: 26-86680
- GNIS feature ID: 1622135
- Website: www.cityofwhitecloud.org

White Cloud is a city in the U.S. state of Michigan, a small town on the bank of the White River. As of the 2020 census, the city population was 1,479. It is the county seat of Newaygo County. Being designated a trail town, the outdoors are a big part of life in White Cloud, with the 4,600 mile North Country Trail stretching nearby, the Mill Pond Park with a beach and playground, and the White Cloud County Park and Campground, being major draws to the area. White Cloud was recognized by the North Country Trail Association as a "Trail Town".

== Geography ==
According to the United States Census Bureau, the city has a total area of 2.00 square miles (5.18 km^{2}), of which 1.95 square miles (5.05 km^{2}) is land and 0.05 square miles (0.13 km^{2}) is water.

== Economy ==
The Newaygo County government, White Cloud Public schools, and the North American Refractories Co. NARCO are the major employers in White Cloud.

The $13 million state-of-the-art White Cloud Feed Mill opened in April 2018 to serve as the area's leader in supplying nutritional products and technologies. Ceres Solutions Cooperative chose to build the mill in the White Cloud Industrial Park given its proximity to the airport, major highway access, as well as access to Marquette Rail.

== Arts and culture ==
The Purple Heart Pow Wow is held in White Cloud every August for families sponsored by the Military Order of the Purple Heart.

== Library ==
The White Cloud Community Library serves as a center of civic, cultural, educational, and recreational information. The library maintains a local history department providing research assistance for patrons as well as many non-residents including genealogy research for Newaygo County. An extensive range of events for adults and children are put on for the community.

== Major highways ==
- M-20 - running east and west
- M-37 - running north and south

== Airport ==
White Cloud Airport is a publicly owned and operated airport with a single 2,917 foot runway. As of 2019 it has a new terminal building, self-service fuel terminal, and is walking distance to downtown White Cloud. Also, it is located next to a new industrial park.

== Demographics ==
Historical population
Census	Pop.	Note	%±
1880	440		—
1890	743		68.9%
1900	595		−19.9%
1910	648		8.9%
1920	618		−4.6%
1930	615		−0.5%
1940	811		31.9%
1950	977		20.5%
1960	1,001		2.5%
1970	1,044		4.3%
1980	1,101		5.5%
1990	1,147		4.2%
2000	1,420		23.8%
2010	1,408		−0.8%
2020	1,479		5.0%
U.S. Decennial Census

=== 2010 census ===
As of the census of 2010, there were 1,408 people, 467 households, and 294 families residing in the city. The population density was 722.1 inhabitants per square mile (278.8/km^{2}). There were 537 housing units at an average density of 275.4 per square mile (106.3/km^{2}). The racial makeup of the city was 83.7% White, 7.0% African American, 0.6% Native American, 0.5% Asian, 3.1% from other races, and 5.2% from two or more races. Hispanic or Latino of any race were 6.5% of the population.

There were 467 households, of which 34.5% had children under the age of 18 living with them, 38.5% were married couples living together, 18.4% had a female householder with no husband present, 6.0% had a male householder with no wife present, and 37.0% were non-families. 30.2% of all households were made up of individuals, and 12.7% had someone living alone who was 65 years of age or older. The average household size was 2.59 and the average family size was 3.20.

The median age in the city was 32.5 years. 25.9% of residents were under the age of 18; 11.3% were between the ages of 18 and 24; 29.1% were from 25 to 44; 22.1% were from 45 to 64; and 11.6% were 65 years of age or older. The gender makeup of the city was 53.8% male and 46.2% female.

=== 2000 census ===
As of the census of 2000, there were 1,420 people, 494 households, and 320 families residing in the city. The population density was 736.7 inhabitants per square mile (284.4/km^{2}). There were 553 housing units at an average density of 286.9 per square mile (110.8/km^{2}). The racial makeup of the city was 86.41% White, 7.25% African American, 1.06% Native American, 0.28% Asian, 0.14% Pacific Islander, 1.90% from other races, and 2.96% from two or more races. Hispanic or Latino of any race were 4.65% of the population.

There were 494 households, out of which 33.0% had children under the age of 18 living with them, 42.7% were married couples living together, 17.4% had a female householder with no husband present, and 35.2% were non-families. 30.8% of all households were made up of individuals, and 14.8% had someone living alone who was 65 years of age or older. The average household size was 2.47 and the average family size was 3.07.

In the city, the population was spread out, with 26.9% under the age of 18, 11.1% from 18 to 24, 29.5% from 25 to 44, 19.1% from 45 to 64, and 13.4% who were 65 years of age or older. The median age was 34 years. For every 100 females, there were 104.9 males. For every 100 females age 18 and over, there were 111.0 males.

The median income for a household in the city was $2,313, and the median income for a family was $31,797. Males had a median income of $2,417 versus $1,417 for females. The per capita income for the city was $11,369. About 19.1% of families and 21.8% of the population were below the poverty line, including 29.7% of those under age 18 and 13.0% of those age 65 or over.
