= Kent City Community Schools =

School district in Michigan, United States

Address
- 200 North Clover Street Kent City, Kent County, Michigan, 49330; United States

District information
- Grades: Pre-Kindergarten-12
- Superintendent: Bill Crane
- Schools: 4
- Budget: $25,290,000 2022-2023 expenditures
- NCES District ID: 2620310

Students and staff
- Students: 1,242 (2024-2025)
- Teachers: 66.2 (on an FTE basis) (2024-2025)
- Staff: 179.36 FTE (2024-2025)
- Student–teacher ratio: 18.76 (2024-2025)

Other information
- Website: www.kentcityschools.org

Kent City Community Schools is a public school district in the Grand Rapids, Michigan area. In Kent County, it serves Kent City, Casnovia, and parts of the townships of Solon, Sparta, and Tyrone. In Muskegon County, it serves part of Casnovia Township. In Ottawa County, it serves part of Chester Township. In Newaygo County, it serves part of Grant Township.

== History ==
Kent City Elementary School contained the high school prior to 1974. The building was built in stages, with the wing facing Muskegon Street opening in January 1952 as an addition to buildings built at an earlier date. In 1958, a bond issue passed to expand the building and build a new elementary school on the site. The district was growing quickly at the time, with a 25 percent increase in enrollment between fall 1958 and fall 1959.

At the time of the 1952 high school's construction, an older building with a pitched roof was also on the site. It was built in 1905 after the previous school burned down from a faulty furnace on January 9, 1905.

The current Kent City High School opened in fall 1974 and was dedicated on March 6, 1975.

In fall 2005, Kent City Middle School opened to house grades six through eight. Moving grades seven and eight from the high school and grade six from the elementary school to the new middle school freed up space in those schools.

== Schools ==
Schools in Kent City Community Schools district
School	Address	Notes
Kent City High School	351 N Main St., Kent City	Grades 9-12. Built 1974.
Kent City Middle School	285 N Main St., Kent City	Grades 6-8. Built 2005.
Kent City Elementary	29 College St., Kent City	Grades PreK-5
Kent City Virtual Academy	351 N Main St., Kent City	Grades 6-12. Online alternative school
