= Newaygo Public Schools =

School district in Michigan, United States

Address
- 360 South Mill Street Newaygo, Newaygo County, Michigan, 49337; United States

District information
- Grades: Pre-Kindergarten-12
- Superintendent: Ben Gilpin
- Schools: 3
- Budget: $22,248,000 2022-2023 expenditures
- NCES District ID: 2625320

Students and staff
- Students: 1,567 (2024-2025)
- Teachers: 88.29 (on an FTE basis) (2024-2025)
- Staff: 189.73 FTE (2024-2025)
- Student–teacher ratio: 17.75 (2024-2025)

Other information
- Website: www.newaygo.net

Newaygo Public Schools is a public school district in the West Michigan county of Newaygo. It serves Newaygo, Brooks Township, and parts of the townships of Ashland, Big Prairie, Croton, Everett, Garfield, and Grant.

== History ==
A new school building (currently Newaygo Elementary) was dedicated on June 3, 1926. The previous school building was then demolished.

In 1952, Vera Wilsie Elementary was built, making more space available in the older school for secondary grades.

The current high school opened in February 1964. A bond issue passed in 2000 funded construction of the current middle school, and the 1926 school became an elementary building called Velma Matson Elementary.

In 2022, voters passed a $22.96 million bond issue to improve district facilities. The elementary schools were consolidated in a newly renovated Velma Matson school, now called Newaygo Elementary, and Vera Wilsie Elementary was demolished.

== Schools ==
Schools in Newaygo Public Schools district
School	Address	Notes
Newaygo High School	360 S. Mill St., Newaygo	Grades 9–12. Built 1964.
Newaygo Middle School	850 E. 76th Street, Newaygo	Grades 5–8
Newaygo Elementary	29 E. Post, Newaygo	Grades PreK-4. Built 1926.
