= Bridgeton Township =

Bridgeton Township may refer to:

- Bridgeton Township, Michigan
- Bridgeton Township, Pennsylvania
