= Sparta High School =

Sparta High School may refer to:

- Sparta High School (Illinois) in Sparta, Illinois
- Sparta High School (Michigan) in Sparta, Michigan
- Sparta High School (Missouri) in Sparta, Missouri
- Sparta High School (New Jersey) in Sparta, New Jersey
- Sparta High School (Wisconsin) in Sparta, Wisconsin

Schools with similar names include:

- High Point Charter School in Sparta, Wisconsin
