= M-37 (Michigan highway) =

State highway in Michigan, United States

M-37
- M-37 highlighted in red

Route information
- Maintained by MDOT
- Length: 221.27 mi (356.10 km)
- Existed: c. July 1, 1919–present
- Tourist routes: Old Mission Peninsula Scenic Heritage Route; Lake Michigan Circle Tour

Major junctions
- South end: I-94 / BL I-94 at Battle Creek
- M-43 in Hastings; M-6 in Kentwood; M-11 in Kentwood; I-96 in Grand Rapids to Walker; M-46 near Casnovia; M-20 in White Cloud; US 10 near Baldwin; M-55 near Cadillac; M-115 in Mesick; US 31 / M-72 / M-22 in Traverse City
- North end: Cul-de-sac at Mission Point Light, Old Mission Peninsula

Location
- Country: United States
- State: Michigan
- Counties: Calhoun, Barry, Kent, Muskegon, Newaygo, Lake, Wexford, Grand Traverse

Highway system
- Michigan State Trunkline Highway System; Interstate; US; State; Byways
← M-36	→ M-38

M-37 is a north–south state trunkline highway in the US state of Michigan. The southern terminus is near the border between Kalamazoo and Calhoun counties at exit 92 of Interstate 94 (I-94) southwest of Battle Creek. The northern terminus is at the Mission Point Light on Old Mission Point in Grand Traverse County. In between, the highway connects Battle Creek, Grand Rapids, and Traverse City. Motorists will travel through agricultural land, forests, suburbs, and large cities along the way. The section of M-37 on the Old Mission Peninsula was designated what is now a Pure Michigan Scenic Byway in 2008.

Originally named the Muskegon, Grand Traverse and Northport State Road, and later the Newaygo and Northport State Road, today's modern highway can be traced back to the 19th century and earlier. The southernmost section between Grand Rapids and Battle Creek parallels an early Indian trail. The modern highway was formed by July 1, 1919, along this segment. By the 1940s, a second section of highway was designated M-37, creating a gap between it and the original section. This gap was eliminated in the 1950s, completing the M-37 corridor in the state. Additional changes to the routing were made through the Grand Rapids area into the 1970s.

== Route description ==
M-37 runs for 221.27 miles (356.10 km) through the western side of the Lower Peninsula of Michigan, connecting Battle Creek, Grand Rapids, and Traverse City. Segments of it have been listed on the National Highway System (NHS), a network of roads important to the nation's economy, defense, and mobility. Through the Grand Rapids area, M-37 is on the NHS along Broadmoor and East Beltline avenues north of M-6 and the concurrency with I-96. The second segment on the NHS runs from M-115 in Mesick to Traverse City. The road has also been designated what is now a Pure Michigan Byway through the Old Mission Peninsula. The trunkline is maintained by the Michigan Department of Transportation (MDOT). As part of this responsibility, the department tracks the traffic volumes along M-37. MDOT uses a metric called average annual daily traffic, which is a calculation of the average traffic level for a segment of roadway on any average day of the year. Along M-37, the volume varies from the peak 49,173 vehicles on a section of I-96/M-37 in Grand Rapids to the 718 vehicles at the northern terminus by the Mission Point Light.

=== West Michigan ===
M-37 starts joined with Business Loop I-94 (BL I-94) as the two highway designations run concurrently at exit 92 on I-94 southwest of Battle Creek. They follow Columbia Avenue and pass around the southern side of the W. K. Kellogg Airport. When the roadway meets M-96, BL I-94/M-37 turns northward, joining M-96 around the eastern end of the airport to Dickman Road. M-37 jogs westerly onto Dickman Road before continuing northward on Helmer Road through suburban residential areas in Springfield and across the Kalamazoo River into Level Park-Oak Park. There, the highway intersects M-89, passes through more residential areas, and exits the Battle Creek metro area.

North of Bedford, M-37 meanders through rural Barry County. The road passes through mixed agricultural and forest lands near several small lakes in the area. On its path to Hastings, the trunkline runs through Dowling and meets the western terminus of M-79. The highway follows Hanover Street through the south side of Hastings into downtown, where it turns west on Green Street and north on Broadway Street. At the intersection of Broadway and State streets, M-37 meets and joins M-43. West of Hastings, M-43 separates and heads south toward Kalamazoo while M-37 turns northwesterly and runs parallel to the Thornapple River. The highway follows the river west and north to the community of Middleville through mixed farms and forests.

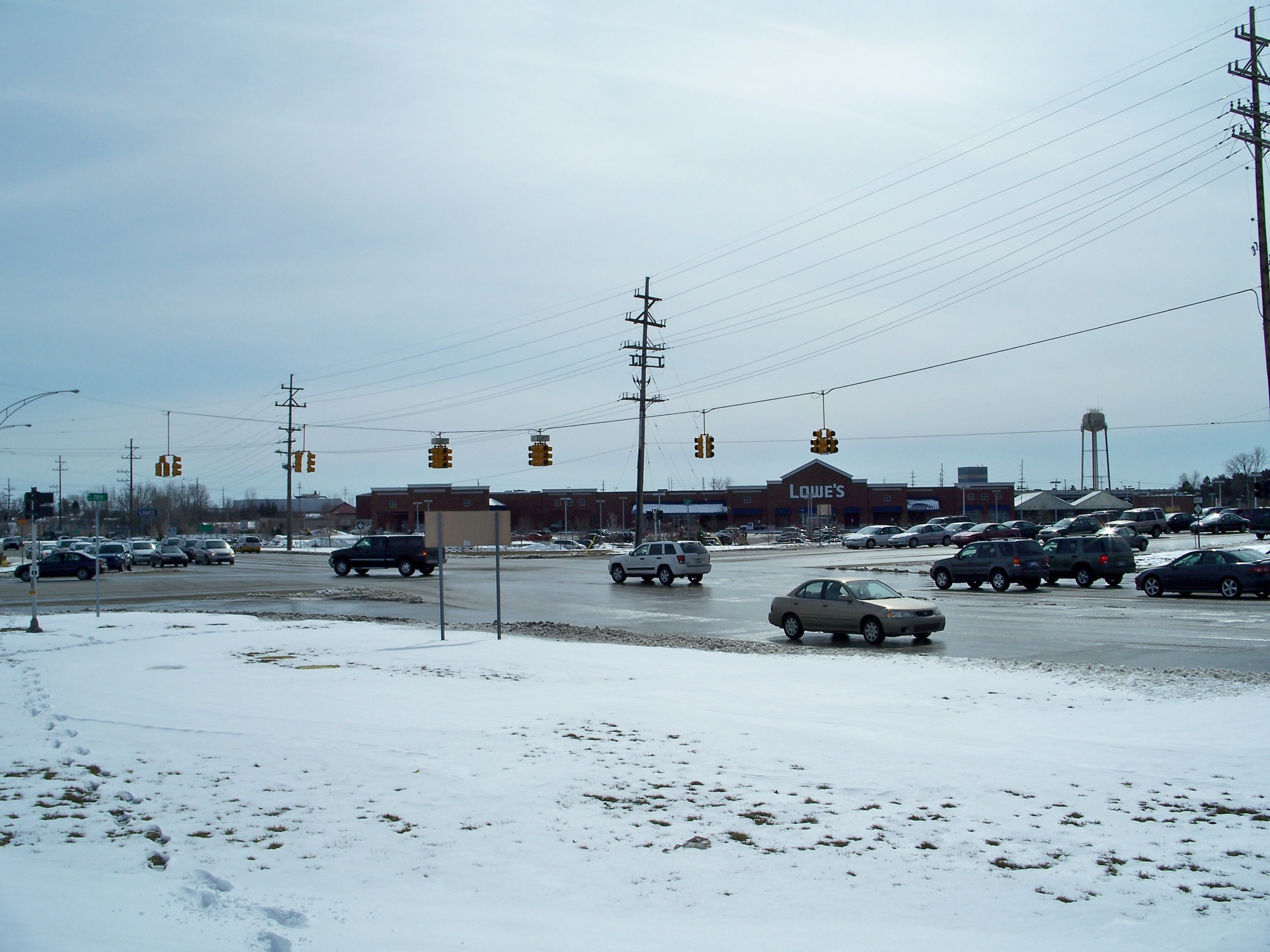
Intersection of 28th Street and East Beltline Avenue in Kentwood looking southwest

In southern Kent County, M-37 follows Cherry Valley Road through Caledonia. As the highway transitions to Broadmoor Avenue, the landscape also transitions from rural to suburban. North of 76th Street, Broadmoor widens to a four-lane boulevard which passes a campus of Davenport University near the M-6 freeway on the outskirts of the Grand Rapids area. This section is dominated by light industrial complexes west of the Gerald R. Ford International Airport in the suburb of Kentwood. These complexes change over to retail establishments north of 32nd Street. At 28th Street, Broadmoor Avenue ends, and East Beltline Avenue begins. M-37 follows East Beltline Avenue between the Woodland Mall and the Centerpointe Mall. North of the malls, M-37 passes through the campus of Calvin University and along residential areas at the east end of Reeds Lake. The intersection of East Beltine Avenue and Fulton Street is the western terminus for M-21, a highway that runs east across the state to Flint. North of this junction, M-37 meets I-96 and M-44

M-37 parts East Beltline Avenue and turns west along I-96. The freeway runs west and then north around the edge of Grand Rapids. Near 3 Mile Road, I-96/M-37 runs west again, continuing across the Grand River and meeting the US Highway 131 (US 131) freeway. The next interchange immediately west of US 131 is for Alpine Avenue, which M-37 follows north. This road runs through a commercial and retail corridor in the communities of Walker and Comstock Park. South of 6 Mile Road, Alpine Avenue widens into a four-lane divided highway. This highway splits from Alpine Avenue north of 8 Mile Road and turns to the northwest as the surroundings transition to rural farmland again. M-37 transitions back to a two-lane road south of Sparta. The trunkline passes to the west of Kent City and crosses into Muskegon County at Casnovia. Through this area, the highway parallels a line of the Marquette Rail that runs north from Grand Rapids.

West of the county line, M-37 meets and merges with M-46 along Apple Avenue. The two highways separate at a roundabout junction where M-37 turns north on Newaygo Road. M-37 passes Half Moon Lake and through Bailey. In recent years the highway has served as the location of West Michigan's Longest Yard Sale which spans about 75 miles (121 km) of the route starting in the Bailey–Grant area of Newaygo County through northern Lake County. Between |Grant and Newaygo, the farms transition to forest. M-82 follows M-37 through downtown and across the Muskegon River. The highway continues north along Evergreen Drive between Emerald, Sylvan, and Twinwood lakes. This area is where M-37 crosses into the Manistee National Forest. M-20 follows M-37 through downtown White Cloud and over the White River. Further north, the road passes through Brohman and Lilley in the northern end of the county.

=== Northern Michigan ===
As M-37 crosses into Lake County, the highway crosses the Pere Marquette River. US 10 follows M-37 through Baldwin. The Marquette Rail line turns westward on the edge of town, and north of Baldwin, the highway forms the dividing line between the Manistee National Forest to the west and the Pere Marquette State Forest to the east. The road crosses the Little Manistee River near Peacock and the Pine River in southwest Wexford County. M-37 curves to the northeast along the edge of the Hodenpyl Dam Pond near Mesick. M-37 turns east to follow M-115 through the community and then returns to a northward course into Sherman and on to Buckley. North of the latter community, the highway crosses into Grand Traverse County. The area around Buckley transitions to agricultural use again. This landscape continues past the M-113 to the area known as Chums Corners. There, M-37 merges with US 31, and the two run through a small unincorporated community that is host to Turtle Creek Stadium, home of the Traverse City Pit Spitters, a minor league baseball team.

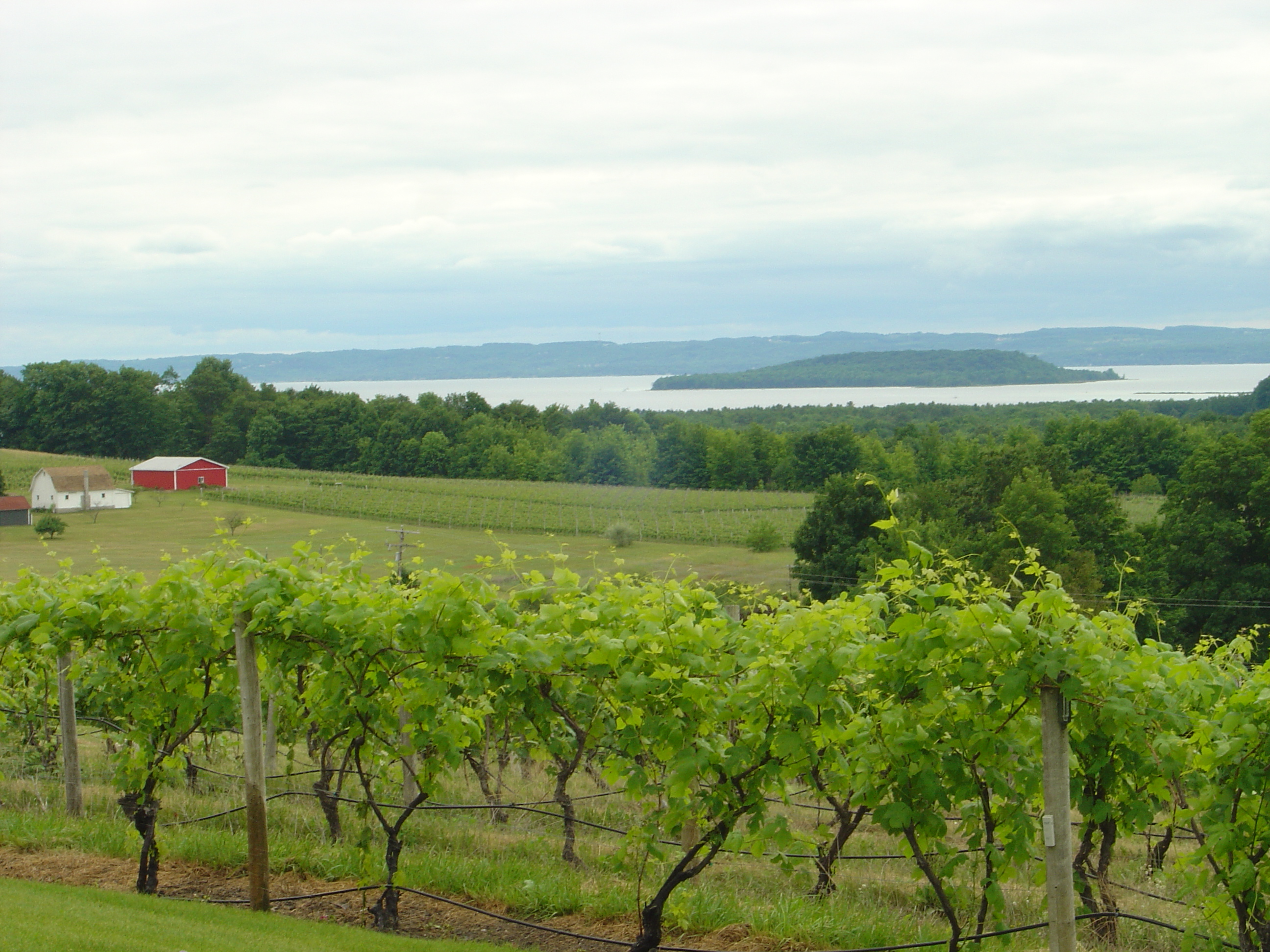
Power Island in West Grand Traverse Bay from a ridge on the Old Mission Peninsula

US 31/M-37 enters the south side of Traverse City near the intersection with South Airport Road and the Grand Traverse Mall. As the highway heads towards Grand Traverse Bay and downtown, it passes several car dealerships, an outlet mall, and other retailers. After the city limits, the roadway is also given the name Division Street. North of 14th Street, US 31/M-37 passes the former Traverse City State Hospital, a Kirkbride Plan former mental asylum. This section of town is mostly residential except for the old state hospital and Munson Medical Center. North of Front Street, Division Street meets Grandview Parkway. This roadway runs along the bay from the northwest carrying M-22/M-72. When the two streets meet, M-22 ends, and US 31/M-37 and M-72 merge into a triple concurrency along the bay north of downtown Traverse City. Grandview Parkway passes the Open Space park, the marina, the former Clinch Park Zoo, and runs along a narrow piece of land between the Boardman River and the bay. Grandview Parkway ends east of the mouth of the river, and the highway continues along Front Street past the Great Lakes Maritime Academy and the home berth of the TS State of Michigan to Garfield Avenue near the campus of Northwestern Michigan College. M-37 turns north along Garfield Avenue to Peninsula Drive, leaving US 31/M-72.

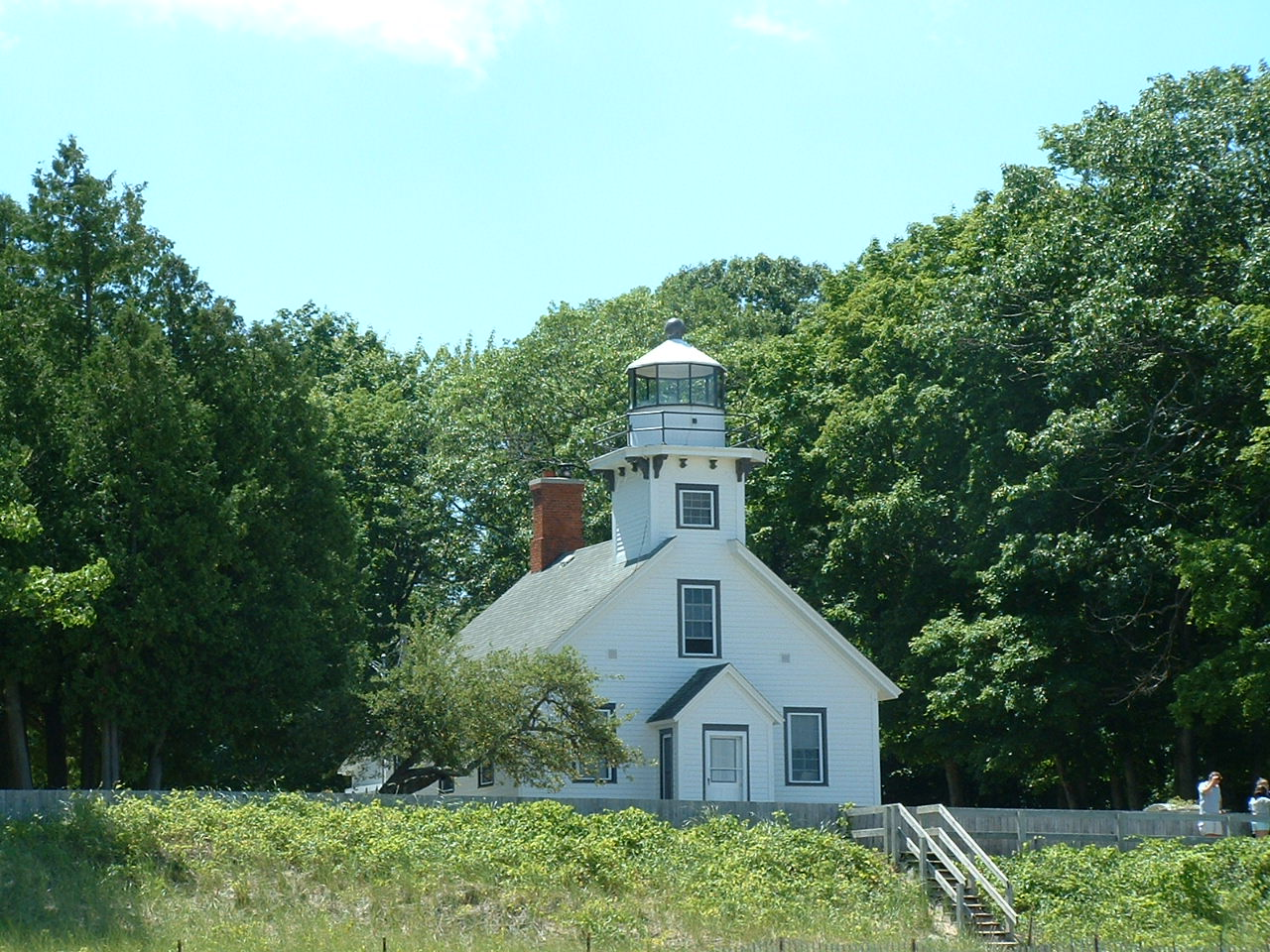
The Mission Point Light at the northern end of M-37 on Old Mission Point

M-37 follows Center Road up the middle of the Old Mission Peninsula. This landform divides Grand Traverse Bay into its east and west arms. The highway runs along a ridge at the center of the peninsula, offering views of each arm of the bay. This area contains the greatest concentration of cherry trees in the US. These trees are said to "explode in a filigree of creamy pink blossoms in May" by the editors of Reader's Digest magazine. The area is also famous for its vineyards and wineries. The peninsula's seven wineries produce Rieslings, pinot grigios and chardonnays. The first grapes were introduced to the region in 1983. In the fall, the area is renowned for its colors in addition to the harvest. Besides cherries and grapes, apples are also grown in the area, contributing to the bounty each year. At the tip of the peninsula is the Mission Point Light, a lighthouse that dates back to 1870. M-37 ends at a cul-de-sac in front of the building which is located near the 45th Parallel, halfway between the North Pole and the Equator.

== History ==
=== Early history ===
The southern section of M-37 follows the path of an early Indian trail that connected the St. Joseph Trail near Kalamazoo and Battle Creek to the Grand River Trail near present-day Alto. These trails "were narrow and permitted only single-file travel." In the Grand Rapids area, Alpine Avenue was originally constructed as a plank road. These roads were at least 8 feet (2.4 m) wide, covered with wood planks 3 inches (76 mm) thick.

A portion of M-37 follows the route of the Muskegon, Grand Traverse, and Northport State Road, which was later renamed the Newaygo and Northport State Road. The road was authorized by the state legislature in 1857, and it was intended to connect the settlements in Muskegon and Newaygo counties, which at the time were "most northerly on the south side of the 'Big Woods'", with the growing settlements around the Grand Traverse Bay. Construction progressed slowly and was only opened through Wexford County in 1863. and the bridge over the Manistee River in 1864 at what is now Sherman.

The Custer Trail, named for General George Armstrong Custer, was created in 1917 along a series of roads between Grand Rapids and Ft. Wayne, Indiana that included the modern M-37. Custer commanded the Michigan Cavalry Bridge during the Civil War, and he was wildly popular in the state after the war. The road that bears his name never achieved that level of popularity. By 1930, the name had already fallen out of use.

=== State highway era ===
The Michigan State Highway Department (MSHD) signed M-37 initially as part of the state trunkline highway system by July 1, 1919. This section of highway ran from Battle Creek to Grand Rapids, roughly along the modern routing. By 1929, the highway was extended north to Peacock in Lake County, replacing the contemporary M-54 in the process. A group of local leaders formed an organization to lobby for the completion of the highway in 1928 when state efforts to do stalled. The Grand Rapids–Leelanau Association named their roadway the Paradise Trail and promoted it as an alternative to both US 31 and US 131. They convinced local landowners to donate land to build the road. Backers named the road for the "divine scenic and recreational delights" in the area.

An unnumbered section of gravel highway was opened in 1937 west of Cadillac; the roadway extended south from M-55 to the Wexford–Lake county line. Later, in 1940, the MSHD renumbered the north–south leg of M-42 from Mesick north to Traverse City and Old Mission. As a result, M-37 was then a discontinuous highway with a gap between M-63 in Peacock to M-115 at Mesick. The spur in Wexford County is shown after 1941 as an "earthen" highway, before disappearing from state maps completely in 1945. A section of M-37 through Newaygo County was renamed in 1945 for Stevens T. Mason, the first governor of the State of Michigan. At the time, Consumers Power Company recommended that all north–south roads in the county bear the name of a state governor as part of a plan to rename the major roads in the county. The company wanted to simplify directions for their employees looking for customers' homes in the area. In the middle of 1948, M-37 was extended to M-55 on a gravel highway that followed the previously unnumbered highway in Wexford County and a new roadway in Lake County. As a result, M-37 still had a gap, but only between M-55 and M-115.

M-37 through the south side of the Grand Rapids area was realigned in late 1949 or early 1950. After the change, the highway follows Broadmoor Avenue to 28th Street and 28th Street west to its former routing along Kalamazoo Avenue. In 1953, this routing was shifted further when M-37 was rerouted to run north on East Beltline Avenue concurrent with US 131 and M-21 to Cascade Road. There it turned west along Cascade Road and Fulton Street into downtown, back to its existing alignment. During that same time frame, the gap in the routing between M-55 and Mesick was eliminated. The highway was moved to bypass Sparta, Kent City, and Casnovia to the southwest in 1962. Another change around the same time frame shifted M-37's routing through Grand Rapids again. This time, M-37 was rerouted to follow M-11/M-21 along 28th Street to the US 131 freeway north to I-96 and back to Alpine Avenue. The final Grand Rapids routing change was made in 1969 when M-37 was moved to its current course along East Beltline Avenue and I-96. This change resulted in a concurrency with the southernmost end of M-44 that was later removed in 1977 when M-44 was truncated northward. A proposed new routing near Comstock Park in the 1970s would have removed M-37 from Alpine Avenue. The new highway, if built, would have run southeastward from the Alpine Avenue split to US 131 near 6 Mile Road. In 2008, the northernmost 18 miles (29 km) on the Old Mission Peninsula were designated what is now a Pure Michigan Scenic Byway by MDOT. In 2013, the hairpin curve on a hill north of Mesick was straightened and the hill slightly leveled.

To expand the blast radius for ammunition testing at Fort Custer, MDOT rerouted the BL I-94/M-37 to run along the southern and eastern edges of the airport in Battle Creek instead of following roads on the opposite sides. This change was completed in 2015.

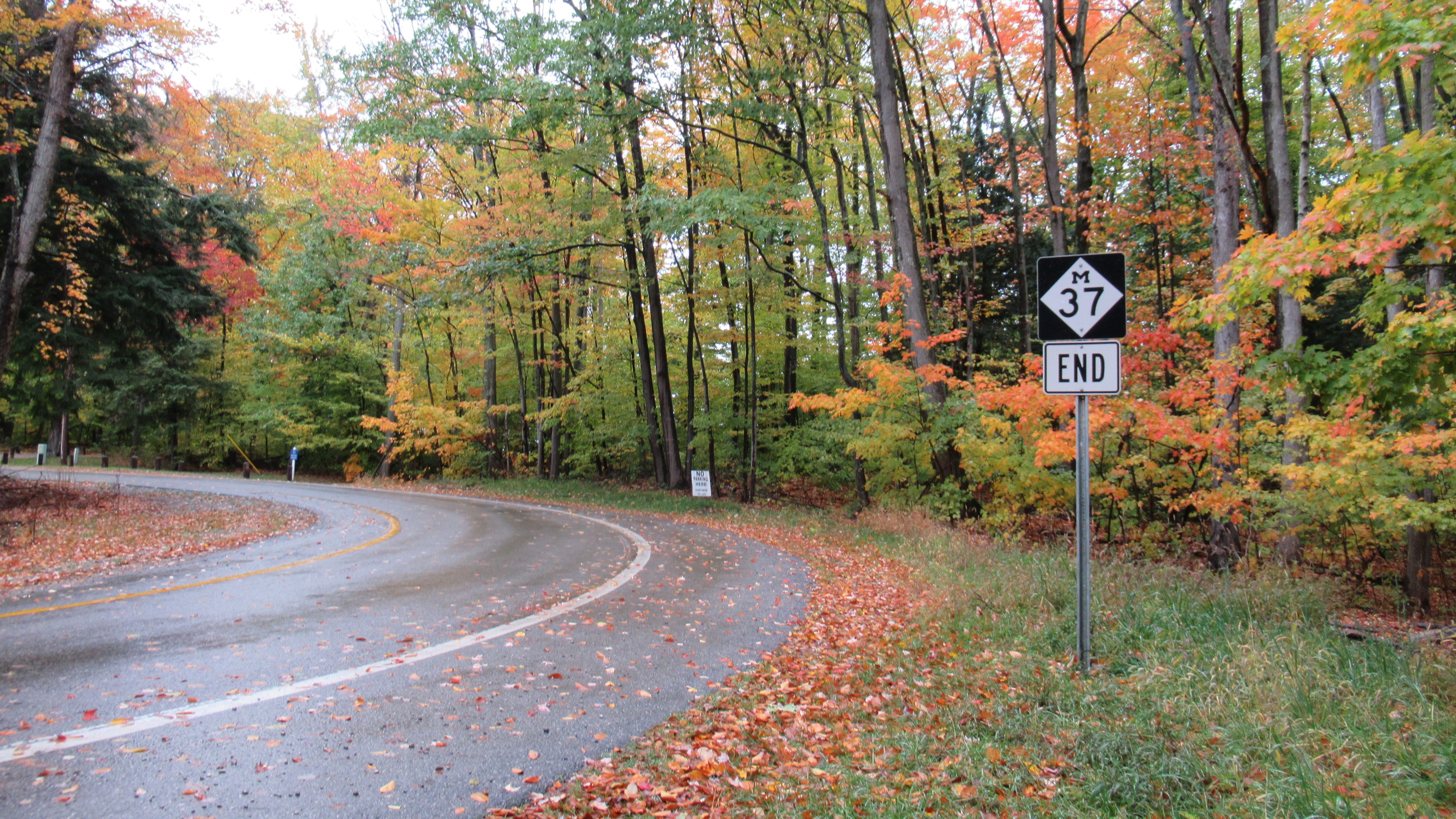
Northern terminus of M-37 just before Old Mission Point

MDOT and the Grand Traverse County Road Commission (GTCRC) announced in August 2019 that the GTCRC would take over ownership of M-37 on the Old Mission Peninsula north of Traverse City effective May 1, 2020. If the change were completed, MDOT would have removed M-37 from the US 31 concurrency through Traverse City, truncating the highway to terminate in Chums Corners. In November 2019, Peninsula Township officials went on record in opposition to the transfer. The City of Traverse City supported accepting jurisdiction of a 0.74-mile (1.19 km) section of M-37 north of US 31/M-72 to the city limits in February 2020. MDOT announced a public hearing for May 21, 2020, to take public comment on the transfer. Because only state trunkline highways are eligible for Pure Michigan Byway status and that section of M-37 has that status, the department is required to conduct at 30-day review of the transfer and removal of byway status. In May 2021, the department announced that it had cancelled plans to transfer M-37 to the local jurisdictions.

== Major intersections ==
County	Location	mi	km	Exit	Destinations	Notes
Calhoun	Battle Creek	0.00	0.00		I-94 – Chicago, Detroit BL I-94 east (Columbia Avenue) – Downtown Battle Creek	Southern end of BL I-94 concurrency; exit 92 on I-94; roadway continues past southern terminus as Mercury Drive
Calhoun	Springfield	4.06	6.53		M-96 east (Columbia Avenue) – Augusta, Kalamazoo; Helmer Road south	Western end of M-96 concurrency
Calhoun	Springfield	4.95	7.97		M-96 west / BL I-94 east (Dickman Road) – Downtown Battle Creek	Northern end of BL I-94/M-96 concurrency; short concurrency with M-96 only
Calhoun	Battle Creek	6.83	10.99		M-89 (Michigan Avenue) – Richland	
Barry	Hastings Township	26.09	41.99		M-79 east – Nashville	Western terminus of M-79
Barry	Hastings	29.23	47.04		M-43 east (Broadway Street) – Woodland; State Street east	Eastern end of M-43 concurrency
Barry	Rutland Township	31.53	50.74		M-43 south to M-179 west – Kalamazoo	M-179 is former county road A-42; western end of M-43 concurrency
Kent	Kentwood	51.45	82.80		M-6 – Lansing, Holland	Exit 15 on M-6
Kent	Kentwood	56.28	90.57		M-11 (28th Street) – Wyoming, Lansing	
Kent	Grand Rapids	59.79	96.22		M-21 east (Fulton Street) – Lowell	
Kent	Grand Rapids	60.50	97.37	38	I-96 east – Lansing M-44 east (East Beltline Avenue)	Western terminus of M-44; eastern end of I-96 concurrency
Kent	Grand Rapids	61.14	98.40	37	I-196 (Ford Freeway) – Downtown Grand Rapids, Holland	Westbound exit and eastbound entrance
Kent	Grand Rapids	61.73	99.34	36	Leonard Street	
Kent	Grand Rapids	65.20	104.93	33	Conn. M-44 east (Plainfield Avenue)	Western terminus of Conn. M-44
Kent	Grand Rapids	66.84	107.57	31	US 131 (I-296 south) – Grand Rapids, Kalamazoo, Big Rapids, Cadillac	Signed as exits 31A (south) and 31B (north); exit 89 on US 131
Kent	Grand Rapids	68.01	109.45		I-96 west – Muskegon	Western end of I-96 concurrency; signed as exit 30B (M-37 north) westbound
Kent	Tyrone Township	83.40	134.22		M-46 east (Muskegon Street) – Cedar Springs; 17 Mile road west	Southeastern end of M-46 concurrency
Muskegon	Casnovia Township	85.97	138.36		M-46 west (Apple Avenue) – Muskegon; Newaygo Road south	Northwestern end of M-46 concurrency; roundabout intersection
Newaygo	Newaygo	98.09	157.86		M-82 east (82nd Street) – Howard City	Southern end of M-82 concurrency
Newaygo	Newaygo	99.74	160.52		M-82 west (Curve Street) – Fremont; Croton Drive east	Northern end of M-82 concurrency
Newaygo	White Cloud	110.08	177.16		M-20 east (Wilcox Avenue) – Big Rapids	Southern end of M-20 concurrency
Newaygo	Wilcox Township	111.57	179.55		M-20 west (1 Mile Road) – Hesperia	Northern end of M-20 concurrency
Newaygo	Lilley Township	125.29	201.63		B-96 east (14 Mile Road)	Western terminus of B-96
Lake	Baldwin	135.44	217.97		US 10 east (Washington Street) – Reed City, Clare	Southern end of US 10 concurrency
Lake	Webber Township	138.39	222.72		US 10 west – Ludington	Northern end of US 10 concurrency
Wexford	South Branch Township	158.32	254.79		M-55 – Manistee, Cadillac	
Wexford	Mesick	173.00	278.42		M-115 west (Mesick Avenue) – Frankfort	Southern end of M-115 concurrency
Wexford	Antioch Township	174.07	280.14		M-115 east – Cadillac; 13 Road south	Northern end of M-115 concurrency
Grand Traverse	Mayfield Township	188.34	303.10		M-113 east – Kingsley	Western terminus of M-113
Grand Traverse	Blair Township	194.35	312.78		US 31 south – Manistee, Ludington; Beitner Road east	Southern end of US 31 concurrency
Grand Traverse	Traverse City	201.29	323.94		M-72 west / M-22 north / LMCT (Grandview Parkway) – Empire, Northport	Western end of M-72/LMCT concurrency; southern terminus of M-22
Grand Traverse	Traverse City	203.27	327.13		US 31 north / M-72 east / LMCT north (Front Street) – Charlevoix, Grayling; Garfield Avenue south	Northern end of US 31/M-72/LMCT concurrency
Grand Traverse	Peninsula Township	221.27	356.10		Cul-de-sac at Mission Point Lighthouse	
1.000 mi = 1.609 km; 1.000 km = 0.621 mi: Concurrency terminus; Incomplete access
