= Sparta Township, Michigan =

- Civil township
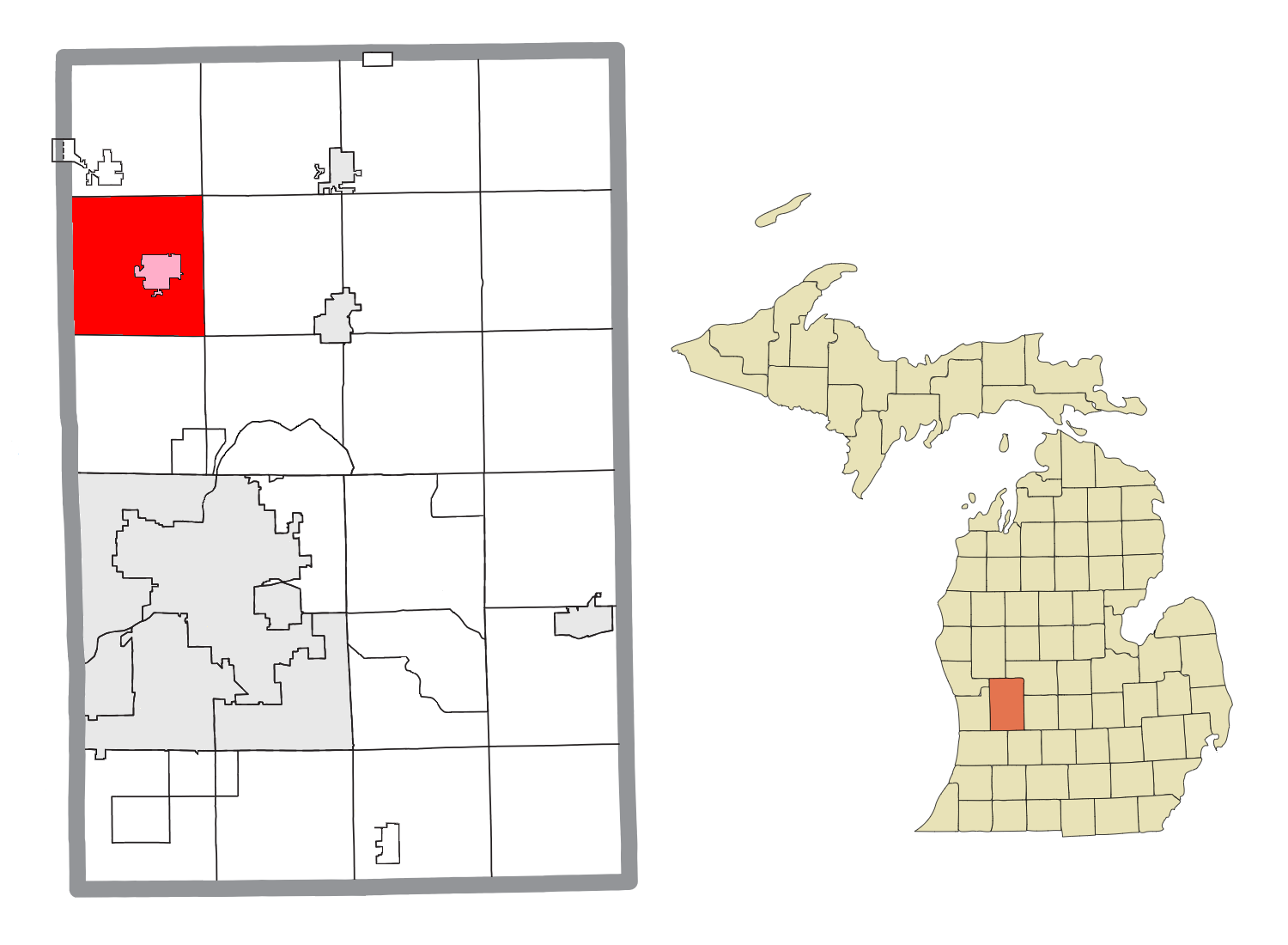
- Location within Kent County

- Location within the state of Michigan Location within the United States
- Coordinates: 43°09′41″N 85°43′40″W
- Country: United States
- State: Michigan
- County: Kent
- Established: 1846

Government
  - Supervisor: Dale Bergman
  - Clerk: Marcy Savage

Area
  - Total: 36.48 sq mi (94.48 km^{2})
  - Land: 36.43 sq mi (94.35 km^{2})
  - Water: 0.050 sq mi (0.13 km^{2})
- Elevation: 758 ft (231 m)

Population (2020)
  - Total: 9,395
  - Density: 250.1/sq mi (96.6/km^{2})
- Time zone: UTC-5 (Eastern (EST))
  - Summer (DST): UTC-4 (EDT)
- ZIP code(s): 49330 (Kent City); 49345 (Sparta)
- Area code: 616
- FIPS code: 26-081-75440
- GNIS feature ID: 1627102
- Website: Official website

Sparta Township is a civil township of Kent County in the U.S. state of Michigan. The population was 9,395 at the 2020 census.

It is part of the Grand Rapids metropolitan area and is located about 10 miles (16 km) northeast of the city of Grand Rapids. The village of Sparta is located within the township.

== Geography ==
According to the U.S. Census Bureau, the township has a total area of 36.48 square miles (94.48 km^{2}), of which 36.43 square miles (94.35 km^{2}) is land and 0.05 square miles (0.13 km^{2}) (0.14%) are water.

=== Major highways ===
- M-37 runs south–north through the center of the township.

== Demographics ==
As of the census of 2000, there were 8,938 people, 3,301 households, and 2,409 families residing in the township. The population density was 244.7 inhabitants per square mile (94.5/km^{2}). There were 3,449 housing units at an average density of 94.4 per square mile (36.4/km^{2}). The racial makeup of the township was 96.13% White, 0.47% African American, 0.26% Native American, 0.30% Asian, 0.01% Pacific Islander, 1.54% from other races, and 1.29% from two or more races. Hispanic or Latino of any race were 3.58% of the population.

There were 3,301 households, out of which 38.7% had children under the age of 18 living with them, 56.7% were married couples living together, 11.8% had a female householder with no husband present, and 27.0% were non-families. 22.6% of all households were made up of individuals, and 9.5% had someone living alone who was 65 years of age or older. The average household size was 2.68 and the average family size was 3.14.

In the township the population was spread out, with 29.5% under the age of 18, 8.6% from 18 to 24, 30.4% from 25 to 44, 19.9% from 45 to 64, and 11.6% who were 65 years of age or older. The median age was 34 years. For every 100 females, there were 94.3 males. For every 100 females age 18 and over, there were 91.3 males.

The median income for a household in the township was $42,992, and the median income for a family was $49,491. Males had a median income of $36,498 versus $24,186 for females. The per capita income for the township was $18,345. About 3.6% of families and 5.5% of the population were below the poverty line, including 5.4% of those under age 18 and 6.3% of those age 65 or over.

== Education ==
Sparta Township is served by two separate school districts. The majority of the township is served by Sparta Area Schools, while a small northern portion is served by Kent City Community Schools.

== Notable people ==
- Ahmed Fareed, American studio host and sports reporter for American television network NBCSN
