= Pat Peppler =

American football coach and executive (1922–2015)

Personal information
- Born: April 16, 1922; Baltimore, Maryland, U.S.
- Died: June 23, 2015 (aged 93); Stuart, Florida, U.S.

Career information
- College: Michigan State

Career history

Coaching
- East Lansing HS (MI) (1949–1953) Head coach; NC State (1954–1961) Assistant coach; Wake Forest (1962) Assistant coach; Atlanta Falcons (1976) Interim head coach

Operations
- Green Bay Packers (1963–1971) Director of player personnel; Green Bay Packers (1971–1972) Assistant general manager; Miami Dolphins (1972–1974) Director of professional scouting; Atlanta Falcons (1975–1976) General manager; Houston Oilers (1977–1980) Assistant general manager; New Orleans Saints (1981–1985) Administrative assistant

Head coaching record
- Regular season: 3–6 (.333)
- Coaching profile at Pro Football Reference
- Executive profile at Pro Football Reference

Albert Patterson Peppler (April 16, 1922 – June 23, 2015) was an American football coach and executive who worked for teams that won five National Football League (NFL) titles. He may be best remembered for serving as head coach of the NFL's Atlanta Falcons during the final nine games of the 1976 NFL season.

== Early life ==
Peppler was born in Baltimore, Maryland in 1922, but was a native of Shorewood, Wisconsin. During his time at Michigan State University, he played not only football, but baseball and basketball as well.

== Career ==
After graduating from Michigan State, Peppler tried playing minor league baseball and became a head football coach at the high school level, winning state championships at both East Lansing High School and Grant High School in Michigan. That success led to an eight-year tenure as an assistant at North Carolina State University beginning in 1954, followed by one year at Wake Forest University in 1962. On January 28, 1963, one month after winning their second straight NFL title, the Green Bay Packers hired Peppler as director of player personnel, where he worked with head coach Vince Lombardi in helping continue a talent pipeline that won three more championships, including their first two Super Bowls.

Even before Lombardi left following the 1967 NFL season, however, Peppler's talent for player procurement stumbled as the team failed to replace the host of future Pro Football Hall of Famers that dotted the roster. On March 24, 1972, Peppler resigned to become director of professional scouting for the Miami Dolphins, replacing Joe Thomas.

In his first two years with Miami, Peppler was part of consecutive Super Bowl championships, a stretch that included a perfect 17–0 campaign during the 1972 NFL season. On February 26, 1975, he accepted the position of general manager for the Atlanta Falcons. Looking to build around the first pick in that year's draft, quarterback Steve Bartkowski, Peppler saw the team finish 4–10 under Marion Campbell during the 1975 NFL season. When Campbell won only one of the first five games the following year, he was fired and Peppler finished out the year, compiling a 3–6 record including back-to-back wins against the San Francisco 49ers and the Dallas Cowboys.

Despite the promise shown in the final two months of the season, which included the upset of the Dallas Cowboys, Peppler's uncertain future forced him to look for other job openings. On February 2, 1977, he was named assistant general manager of the Houston Oilers, a post he held for four seasons. During that time, the Oilers competed in two AFC Championship Games against the Pittsburgh Steelers, but when head coach Bum Phillips was fired after a disappointing end to the 1980 NFL season, and accepted the head coaching position with the New Orleans Saints. Peppler followed him, taking a front office job on January 27, 1981.

The Saints, coming off a 1–15 campaign in 1980, spent the next few years rebuilding, but after nearly five years of struggles, Phillips resigned on November 25, 1985, with Peppler also being asked to resign at the same time. The move marked the end of Peppler's NFL career. Peppler died on June 23, 2015, in Stuart, Florida, at the age of 93.
