= Newaygo County Regional Educational Service Agency =

Coordinates: 43°28′04.75″N 85°55′01.15″W

The Newaygo County Regional Educational Service Agency (NCRESA) is an Intermediate School District in Michigan serving the school districts that are primarily within Newaygo County. NCRESA provides services to six local public districts and five non-public schools within its boundaries. Directly or indirectly, NCRESA serves about 30 schools, with approximately 10,000 students.

== Public School Districts ==
- Big Jackson School District
- Fremont Public School District
- Grant Public School District
- Hesperia Community Schools
- Newaygo Public Schools
- White Cloud Public Schools

== Non-Public Schools ==
- Cornerstone Christian Academy
- Faith Baptist Academy
- Fremont Christian School
- Grant Christian School
- Providence Christian High School

== Other ==
- Newaygo County Career Technical Education Center
