= Casnovia Township, Michigan =

- Township
- Location within Michigan Location within the United States
- Coordinates: 43°15′11″N 85°50′50″W
- Country: United States
- State: Michigan
- County: Muskegon

Area
  - Total: 35.75 sq mi (92.6 km^{2})
  - Land: 35.60 sq mi (92.2 km^{2})
  - Water: 0.16 sq mi (0.41 km^{2})
- Elevation: 890 ft (270 m)

Population (2020)
  - Total: 2,793
  - Density: 78.5/sq mi (30.3/km^{2})
- Time zone: UTC-5 (Eastern (EST))
  - Summer (DST): UTC-4 (EDT)
- ZIP codes: 49318 (Casnovia); 49303 (Bailey); 49451 (Ravenna); 49327 (Grant); 49330 (Kent City)
- Area code: 616
- FIPS code: 26-13840
- GNIS feature ID: 1626042
- Website: casnoviatownshipmi.gov

Casnovia Township is a civil township of Muskegon County in the U.S. state of Michigan. The population was 2,793 at the 2020 census.

== Geography ==
The township is the easternmost in Muskegon County, bordered to the north by Newaygo County, to the east by Kent County, and to the south by Ottawa County. The center of the township is 20 miles (32 km) east of Muskegon, the county seat, and 25 miles (40 km) north-northwest of Grand Rapids.

According to the U.S. Census Bureau, the township has a total area of 35.8 square miles (93 km^{2}), of which 35.6 square miles (92 km^{2}) are land and 0.2 square miles (0.5 km^{2}), or 0.44%, are water. The township is drained by Crockery Creek, which flows southward across the west side of the township, running to the Grand River south of Nunica.

== Communities ==
- The village of Casnovia lies partially within the township on M-46 and M-37 at the eastern edge of the township.
- Bailey is an unincorporated community on M-37 in the northeast corner of the township at 43°16′40″N 85°48′37″W. The ZIP code is 49303. Nearly all of northern Casnovia Township (which includes Bailey) is part of the Grant Public School District. A post office was established here in 1872.

== Demographics ==
Historical population
Census	Pop.	Note	%±
1860	604		—
1870	1,094		81.1%
1880	1,715		56.8%
1890	1,734		1.1%
1900	1,940		11.9%
1910	1,686		−13.1%
1920	1,485		−11.9%
1930	1,292		−13.0%
1940	1,478		14.4%
1950	1,595		7.9%
1960	1,578		−1.1%
1970	1,879		19.1%
1980	2,158		14.8%
1990	2,361		9.4%
2000	2,652		12.3%
2010	2,805		5.8%
2020	2,793		−0.4%
U.S. Decennial Census

As of the census of 2000, there were 2,652 people, 881 households, and 702 families residing in the township. The population density was 74.3 inhabitants per square mile (28.7/km^{2}). There were 955 housing units at an average density of 26.8 per square mile (10.3/km^{2}). The racial makeup of the township was 94.34% White, 0.38% Native American, 0.11% Asian, 3.39% from other races, and 1.77% from two or more races. Hispanic or Latino of any race were 5.58% of the population.

There were 881 households, out of which 40.9% had children under the age of 18 living with them, 68.8% were married couples living together, 5.7% had a female householder with no husband present, and 20.3% were non-families. 15.4% of all households were made up of individuals, and 6.4% had someone living alone who was 65 years of age or older. The average household size was 2.97 and the average family size was 3.32.

In the township the population was spread out, with 30.8% under the age of 18, 8.4% from 18 to 24, 31.2% from 25 to 44, 21.6% from 45 to 64, and 8.0% who were 65 years of age or older. The median age was 33 years. For every 100 females, there were 106.2 males. For every 100 females age 18 and over, there were 106.4 males.

The median income for a household in the township was $41,711, and the median income for a family was $46,875. Males had a median income of $37,458 versus $26,029 for females. The per capita income for the township was $16,880. About 7.0% of families and 7.9% of the population were below the poverty line, including 10.1% of those under age 18 and 11.7% of those age 65 or over.
