= Kent High School =

Kent High School could refer to the following schools:

== United States ==
- Kent-Meridian High School in Kent, Washington, originally known as Kent High School
- Theodore Roosevelt High School in Kent, Ohio, originally known as Kent High School
- Kent City High School in Kent City, Michigan
- Kent Island High School in Stevensville, Maryland
- New Kent High School in New Kent, Virginia

== Australia ==
- Kent Street Senior High School in Kensington, Western Australia
