= Casnovia, Michigan =

- Village
- Location of Casnovia in Kent County and the state of Michigan
- Coordinates: 43°14′5″N 85°47′18″W
- Country: United States
- State: Michigan
- Counties: Kent, Muskegon
- Townships: Tyrone, Casnovia

Area
  - Total: 1.07 sq mi (2.78 km^{2})
  - Land: 1.06 sq mi (2.75 km^{2})
  - Water: 0.0077 sq mi (0.02 km^{2})
- Elevation: 899 ft (274 m)

Population (2020)
  - Total: 316
  - Density: 297/sq mi (114.8/km^{2})
- Time zone: UTC-5 (Eastern (EST))
  - Summer (DST): UTC-4 (EDT)
- ZIP code: 49318
- Area code: 616
- FIPS code: 26-13820
- GNIS feature ID: 0622844
- Website: https://villageofcasnovia.org/

Casnovia is a village in the U.S. state of Michigan. It is situated on the boundary between Muskegon and Kent counties and lies partially within each. The population was 316 at the 2020 census.

== History ==
Casnovia was founded in 1850 by Lot Fulkerson and gained a post office in 1851. It was platted in 1862 and incorporated as a village in 1875. The name is derived from the Latin words case for home and nova for new.

== Geography ==
The village is in western Michigan, in the eastern part of Muskegon County and the northwest part of Kent County. The village is in eastern Casnovia Township and western Tyrone Township. The village's Main Street, running north-south, follows the county line. State highways M-46 and M-37 pass together through the southern part of the village, leading southeast 2 miles (3 km) to Kent City. M-37 leads south 22 miles (35 km) to Grand Rapids and north 14 miles (23 km) to Newaygo, while M-46 leads west 23 miles (37 km) to Muskegon and east 12 miles (19 km) to Cedar Springs.

According to the U.S. Census Bureau, Casnovia has a total area of 1.07 square miles (2.77 km^{2}), of which 0.01 square miles (0.03 km^{2}), or 0.84%, are water.

== Demographics ==
Historical population
Census	Pop.	Note	%±
1880	196		—
1890	275		40.3%
1900	277		0.7%
1910	308		11.2%
1920	333		8.1%
1930	254		−23.7%
1940	289		13.8%
1950	312		8.0%
1960	371		18.9%
1970	403		8.6%
1980	348		−13.6%
1990	376		8.0%
2000	315		−16.2%
2010	319		1.3%
2020	316		−0.9%
U.S. Decennial Census

=== 2020 census ===
As of the 2020 United States census, the village had a population of 316 people. The racial makeup was 70.6% White, 0.5% Black, 2.5% Asian, 5.5% Native American, and 18.3% from two or more races. Hispanic or Latino people of any race were 22.7% of the population.

=== 2010 census ===
As of the census of 2010, there were 319 people, 121 households, and 94 families living in the village. The population density was 295.4 inhabitants per square mile (114.1/km^{2}). There were 131 housing units at an average density of 121.3 per square mile (46.8/km^{2}). The racial makeup of the village was 88.4% White, 0.3% African American, 1.9% Native American, 4.4% from other races, and 5.0% from two or more races. Hispanic or Latino of any race were 11.6% of the population.

There were 121 households, of which 28.1% had children under the age of 18 living with them, 65.3% were married couples living together, 7.4% had a female householder with no husband present, 5.0% had a male householder with no wife present, and 22.3% were non-families. 15.7% of all households were made up of individuals, and 3.3% had someone living alone who was 65 years of age or older. The average household size was 2.64 and the average family size was 2.97.

The median age in the village was 41.9 years. 22.3% of residents were under the age of 18; 8.6% were between the ages of 18 and 24; 23.8% were from 25 to 44; 32.3% were from 45 to 64; and 12.9% were 65 years of age or older. The gender makeup of the village was 50.8% male and 49.2% female.

=== 2000 census ===
As of the census of 2000, there were 315 people, 122 households, and 91 families living in the village. The population density was 287.6 inhabitants per square mile (111.0/km^{2}). There were 126 housing units at an average density of 115.0 per square mile (44.4/km^{2}). The racial makeup of the village was 98.73% White, 0.32% Native American, and 0.95% from two or more races. Hispanic or Latino of any race were 0.32% of the population.

There were 122 households, out of which 33.6% had children under the age of 18 living with them, 60.7% were married couples living together, 8.2% had a female householder with no husband present, and 25.4% were non-families. 19.7% of all households were made up of individuals, and 8.2% had someone living alone who was 65 years of age or older. The average household size was 2.58 and the average family size was 2.98.

In the village, the population was spread out, with 25.4% under the age of 18, 8.6% from 18 to 24, 33.3% from 25 to 44, 21.9% from 45 to 64, and 10.8% who were 65 years of age or older. The median age was 35 years. For every 100 females, there were 107.2 males. For every 100 females age 18 and over, there were 99.2 males.

The median income for a household in the village was $42,019, and the median income for a family was $47,188. Males had a median income of $36,563 versus $26,250 for females. The per capita income for the village was $18,962. About 1.2% of families and 4.7% of the population were below the poverty line, including 5.8% of those under age 18 and 5.1% of those age 65 or over.

== Notable people ==
- Bion J. Arnold, electrical engineer; born in Casnovia
- Floyd R. Newman (1890–1990), oil man
