= Grant Depot and Water Tower =

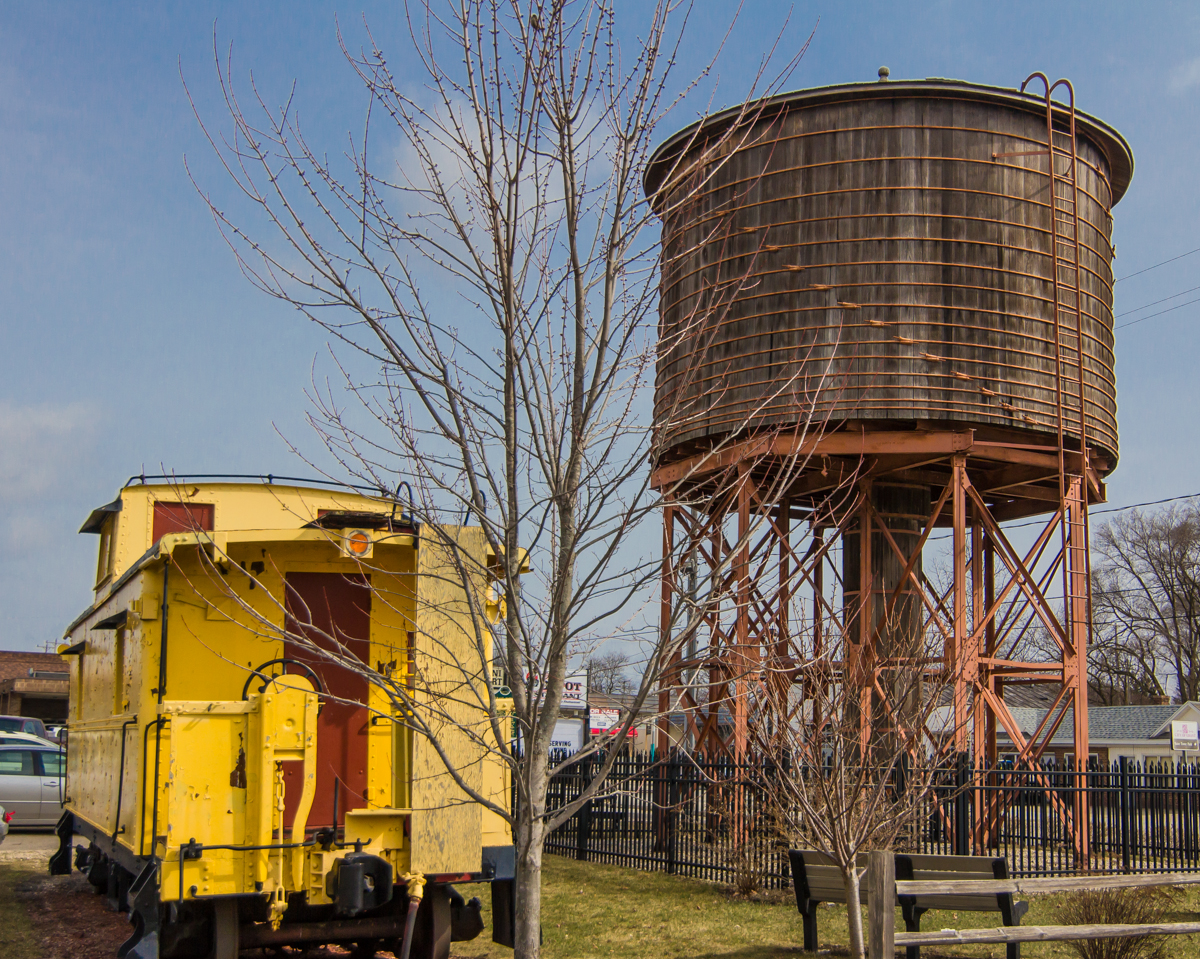

- Location within the state of Michigan
- 43°20′03″N 85°48′40″W
- Location: Grant, Newaygo County, Michigan

History
- Built: 1891

Site notes
- Governing body: Depot: Private; Tower: Municipal Govt

Michigan State Historic Site

The Grant Depot and Water Tower (or The Grand Rapids, Newaygo and Lake Shore Railroad Company Depot and Water Tower) is a state historical site in Grant, Michigan. The railroad depot and water tower were built in 1891 by the Chicago and West Michigan Railroad, and within a few years became part of the Pere Marquette System. The water tower is believed to be the last original wooden water tower in the State of Michigan, and the site was added to the Michigan State Historical Registry on June 10, 1980.

== History ==
After being built in 1891, the station quickly became a very important part of the local economy. In terms of agriculture, around this time, Grant shipped a lot of produce by rail. In 1915, 10 to 12 cars of peaches a day were shipped, and later in the 1930s carloads of onions were shipped out from this station, earning Grant the title of "Onion Capital of the World."

This station was also very important in regards to the lumbering industry. During the seasons of 1872–73, 9,000,000 board feet (20,000 m^{3}) of logs came of out of Newaygo County, mostly from the Grant Station, at the rate of 100,000 a day. This was one of the first log trains in Michigan. By 1885 Andrew T. Squire, owner of the local saw mill and founder of Grant, was producing 1,000,000 board feet (2,000 m^{3}) of lumber per year.

Until the late 1940s, there were two passenger trains, (each way) running everyday between Grand Rapids and Traverse City, through the Grant Depot. The last passenger train ran in 1963.

In 1979 the depot was rebuilt to serve as a restaurant. The agents office and waiting room became a dining room. The freight room, became a kitchen, and an addition on the east side serves as an additional dining room. This restaurant is still operational today.

== Water Tower Move ==
Up until June 26, 2008, the City-owned water tower sat on 0.004 acres (20 m^{2}) of CSX owned land. The City of Grant had been paying a lease for that land for many years and CSX railroad was not interested in allowing for a state historical marker to be placed. Therefore, it was decided to move the water tower 128 feet (39 m) to the east, in front of the city-owned caboose. This would allow the city to stop paying the lease, a historical marker to be place, and a small park to be created at the site. This move cost the city $60,000, of which the Fremont Area Community Foundation awarded $50,000 in grants. The move attracted hundreds of on-lookers to the city including local television, and newspaper media. Prior to the move, The State Historical Commission was contacted, and they gave their approval and support for the project.

== State Historical Registry ==
This site was added to the Michigan State Historical Registry on June 10, 1980. It was assigned ID# P24311.
