= Sparta High School (Michigan) =

Public secondary school in Sparta, Michigan, US

Location
- 475 West Spartan Drive; Sparta, Michigan 49345; United States; 43.151°N 85.718°W

Information
- Type: Public secondary school
- School district: Sparta Area Schools
- Superintendent: Joel Stoner
- Principal: Stacey Rumsey
- Teaching staff: 39.53 (on an FTE basis)
- Grades: 9-12
- Enrollment: 778 (2024–2025)
- Student to teacher ratio: 19.68
- Colors: Blue and white
- Athletics conference: River City Alliance
- Nickname: Spartans
- Website: www.spartaschools.org/schools/highschool/

Sparta High School is a public high school located in Sparta, Michigan, United States. It serves grades 9-12 for the Sparta Area Schools.

== Academics ==
Sparta High School was ranked 195th in Michigan and 5,886th nationally in the 2021 U.S. News & World Report's annual survey of US public high schools. Spatra offers Advanced Placement and honors programs; duel enrollment through Ferris State University; and vocational education programs through the Kent Career Technical Center.

== Athletics ==
The Sparta Spartans compete in the River City Alliance (Silver division). School colors are blue and white. The following Michigan High School Athletic Association (MHSAA) sanctioned sports are offered:

- Baseball (boys)
- Basketball (girls and boys)
- Bowling (girls and boys)
- Competitive cheer (girls)
- Cross country (girls and boys)
  - Boys state champion - 1962
- Football (boys)
- Golf (girls and boys)
- Gymnastics (girls) (coop team with Rockford)
  - State champion - 2015, 2016
- Ice hockey (boys)
- Soccer (girls and boys)
- Softball (girls)
- Tennis (girls and boys)
- Track and field (girls and boys)
- Volleyball (girls)
- Wrestling (boys)
