= Sparta Area Schools =

School district in Michigan

Address
- 465 South Union Street Sparta, Kent, Michigan, 49345; United States

District information
- Grades: Pre-Kindergarten-12
- Superintendent: Joel Stoner
- Schools: 4
- Budget: $43,472,000 2022-2023 expenditures
- NCES District ID: 2632370

Students and staff
- Students: 2,371 (2024-2025)
- Teachers: 140.92 (on an FTE basis) (2024-2025)
- Staff: 326.69 FTE (2024-2025)
- Student–teacher ratio: 16.83 (2024-2025)
- District mascot: Spartans

Other information
- Website: www.spartaschools.org

Sparta Area Schools is a public school district in the Grand Rapids, Michigan area. In Kent County, it serves Sparta and parts of the townships of Algoma, Alpine, Sparta, and Tyrone. In Ottawa County, it serves parts of Chester Township and Wright Township.

== History ==
The first school in Sparta was an informal classroom in Harriet Symes' log cabin. The next year, 1847, Sparta's public school district was organized, and it built Nash School in 1849. As enrollment grew, a two-story white brick building was built in 1875 to house the public school. It was located on the west side of North Union Street between Alma and Grove Streets—a site that would be used for schooling until 2008. The first high school class graduated in 1881, but the high school didn't go to grade twelve until 1894.

A new school was built in 1901 on the site of the 1875 school. It was expanded several times over the next five decades, and housed the high school until 1959. Elementary school wings were added in 1949 and 1954 and were known as Central Elementary. In 1970, the older sections of the building were demolished, leaving the elementary wings, which closed in 2008 and were torn down in 2009.

In fall 1959, a new high school opened at 480 South State Street. Guido Binda was the architect.

Appleview Elementary was built in 1968 and was originally the district's middle school. McMiller and Palmer of Grand Rapids was the architecture firm.

Ridgeview Elementary opened in fall 1990. The school’s architect, The Design Forum, Inc., received an award from the American Institute of Architects, which praised the design for its "Lego-like quality of the masonry."

As part of a bond issue passed in 2004, the high school was converted to a middle school and the middle school was converted to Appleview Elementary. It also funded construction of the current high school, which opened in fall 2007. A new middle school opened in fall 2020. The former middle school (the 1959 high school building) became the Early Childhood Center.

Defunct schools in the district include Myers School, built in 1952 and closed in 1999. It replaced an older Myers School that, as of 2015, was used as a museum. Englishville Alternative High School, at 8285 Vinton Ave. in Plainfield Township, closed in 2013.

== Schools ==
Schools in Sparta Area Schools district
| School | Address | Notes |
|---|---|---|
| Sparta High School | 475 W. Spartan Drive, Sparta | Grades 9-12. Opened 2007. |
| Sparta Middle School | 235 E Spartan Drive, Sparta | Grades 6-8. Opened 2020. |
| Appleview Elementary | 240 E. Spartan Drive, Sparta | Grades 3-5. Opened 1968. |
| Ridgeview Elementary | 560 W. Spartan Drive, Sparta | Grades K-2. Opened 1990. |
| Early Childhood Center | 480 S State St, Sparta | Preschool. Opened 1959. |
