= Garfield Township, Newaygo County, Michigan =

Garfield Township, Michigan
- Township
- Location within the state of Michigan Garfield Township, Michigan (the United States)
- Coordinates: 43°25′38″N 85°50′47″W
- Country: United States
- State: Michigan
- County: Newaygo

Area
  - Total: 34.1 sq mi (88.2 km^{2})
  - Land: 33.0 sq mi (85.4 km^{2})
  - Water: 1.0 sq mi (2.7 km^{2})
- Elevation: 820 ft (250 m)

Population (2020)
  - Total: 2,486
  - Density: 75.4/sq mi (29.1/km^{2})
- Time zone: UTC-5 (Eastern (EST))
  - Summer (DST): UTC-4 (EDT)
- FIPS code: 26-31640
- GNIS feature ID: 1626340
- Website: https://www.garfieldtownship.org/

Garfield Township is a civil township of Newaygo County in the U.S. state of Michigan. The population was 2,486 at the 2020 census.

== Geography ==
According to the United States Census Bureau, the township has a total area of 34.0 square miles (88 km^{2}), of which 33.0 square miles (85 km^{2}) is land and 1.0 square mile (2.6 km^{2}) (3.08%) is water.

== Communities ==
- Bishop was a village founded in 1898. It was named for Roswell P. Bishop, who represented the area in Congress at that time.

== Demographics ==
As of the census of 2000, there were 2,464 people, 844 households, and 629 families residing in the township. The population density was 74.7 inhabitants per square mile (28.8/km^{2}). There were 1,096 housing units at an average density of 33.2 per square mile (12.8/km^{2}). The racial makeup of the township was 93.43% White, 0.28% African American, 0.65% Native American, 0.77% Asian, 0.04% Pacific Islander, 3.49% from other races, and 1.34% from two or more races. Hispanic or Latino of any race were 7.31% of the population.

There were 844 households, out of which 32.5% had children under the age of 18 living with them, 62.9% were married couples living together, 7.3% had a female householder with no husband present, and 25.4% were non-families. 21.9% of all households were made up of individuals, and 10.7% had someone living alone who was 65 years of age or older. The average household size was 2.77 and the average family size was 3.25.

In the township the population was spread out, with 27.4% under the age of 18, 6.8% from 18 to 24, 23.2% from 25 to 44, 25.0% from 45 to 64, and 17.6% who were 65 years of age or older. The median age was 40 years. For every 100 females, there were 95.1 males. For every 100 females age 18 and over, there were 92.1 males.

The median income for a household in the township was $38,548, and the median income for a family was $44,453. Males had a median income of $36,048 versus $23,816 for females. The per capita income for the township was $16,410. About 5.8% of families and 9.8% of the population were below the poverty line, including 12.5% of those under age 18 and 10.0% of those age 65 or over.

== See also ==
- Grant Public School District (Garfield Township, South of Muskegon River)
