= Tyrone Township, Kent County, Michigan =

Tyrone Township, Michigan
- Civil township
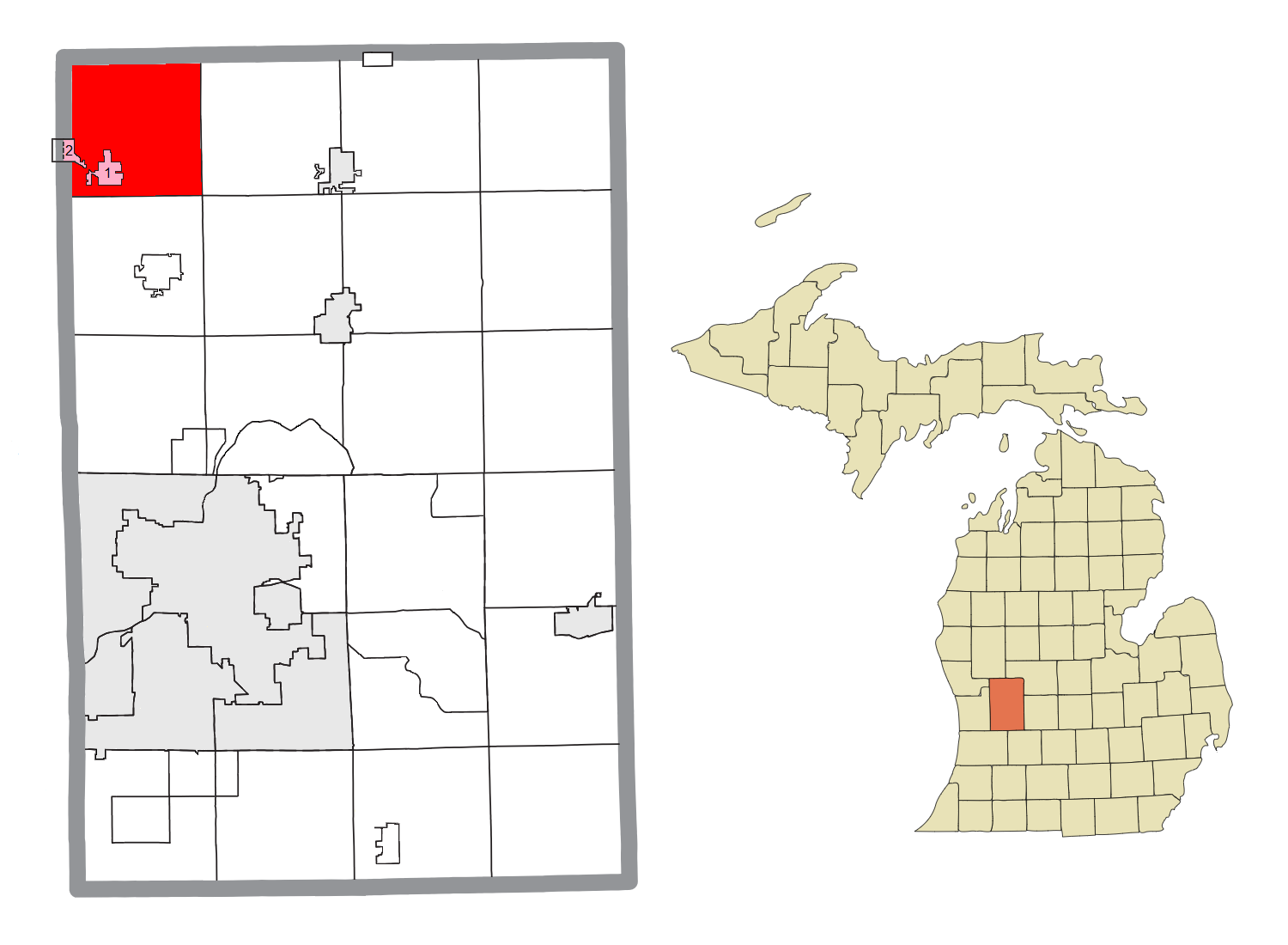
- Location within Kent County (red) and the administered villages of Kent City (1) and portion of Casnovia (2) (pink)

- Location within the state of Michigan Location within the United States
- Coordinates: 43°14′30″N 85°44′12″W
- Country: United States
- State: Michigan
- County: Kent
- Settled: 1849
- Established: 1855

Government
  - Supervisor: Dave Ignasiak
  - Clerk: Dolan Bair

Area
  - Total: 36.36 sq mi (94.17 km^{2})
  - Land: 36.12 sq mi (93.55 km^{2})
  - Water: 0.24 sq mi (0.62 km^{2})
- Elevation: 797 ft (243 m)

Population (2020)
  - Total: 5,021
  - Density: 139.0/sq mi (53.67/km^{2})
- Time zone: UTC-5 (Eastern (EST))
  - Summer (DST): UTC-4 (EDT)
- ZIP code(s): 49318 (Casnovia); 49319 (Cedar Springs); 49330 (Kent City)
- Area code: 616
- FIPS code: 26-081-81140
- GNIS feature ID: 1627181
- Website: Official website

Tyrone Township is a civil township of Kent County, Michigan, United States. As of the 2020 census, the township had a total population of 5,021.

It is part of the Grand Rapids metropolitan area and is located about 20 miles (32 km) north of the city of Grand Rapids. The village of Kent City is located within the township, as is the eastern portion of the village of Casnovia.

== History ==
The area was first settled as early as 1849 and formally organized as a civil township in 1855.

== Geography ==
According to the U.S. Census Bureau, the township has a total area of 36.36 square miles (94.17 km^{2}), of which 36.12 square miles (93.55 km^{2}) is land and 0.24 square miles (0.62 km^{2}) (0.66%) is water.

The Rogue River flows through the township and also includes the Rogue River State Game Area.

=== Major highways ===
- M-37 runs briefly through the southwestern corner of the township before merging concurrent with M-46.
- M-46 (17 Mile Road) runs east–west through the southern portion of the township.

== Demographics ==
=== 2020 census ===
As of the 2020 United States census, the township had a population of 5,021 people. The racial makeup was 85.8% Non-Hispanic White, 0.5% Black or African American, 0.3% Asian, 0.3% Native American, and 3.5% from two or more races. Hispanic or Latino people of any race were 11.4% of the population.

=== 2000 census ===
At the census of 2000, there were 4,304 people, 1,449 households, and 1,185 families residing in the township. The population density was 118.3 inhabitants per square mile (45.7/km^{2}). There were 1,503 housing units at an average density of 41.3 units per square mile (15.9 units/km^{2}). The racial makeup of the township was 96.98% White, 0.12% African American, 0.28% Native American, 0.21% Asian, 0.00% Pacific Islander, 1.53% from other races, and 0.88% from two or more races. 4.93% of the population were Hispanic or Latino of any race.

There were 1,449 households, out of which 43.8% had children under the age of 18 living with them, 66.9% were married couples living together, 10.3% had a female householder with no husband present, and 18.2% were non-families. 14.7% of all households were made up of individuals, and 4.3% had someone living alone who was 65 years of age or older. The average household size was 2.96 and the average family size was 3.26.

In the township the population was spread out, with 31.7% under the age of 18, 9.1% from 18 to 24, 30.9% from 25 to 44, 20.5% from 45 to 64, and 7.8% who were 65 years of age or older. The median age was 32 years. For every 100 females, there were 99.8 males. For every 100 females aged 18 and over, there were 99.9 males.

The median income for a household in the township was $48,006, and the median income for a family was $51,750. Males had a median income of $37,429 versus $27,381 for females. The per capita income for the township was $18,879. 9.4% of the population and 6.1% of families were below the poverty line. Out of the total population, 11.0% of those under the age of 18 and 11.6% of those 65 and older were living below the poverty line.

== Education ==
Almost the entire township is served by Kent City Community Schools. A very small portion of the southeast corner of the township is served by Sparta Area Schools, and a very small northern portion is served by Grant Public School District to the north in Newaygo County.
