= Floyd R. Newman =

American oil man and founder of Allied Oil Company, Inc. of Cleveland

Floyd Roy Newman (May 4 1890 – October 10, 1990), known to his friends as F. R. or Flood, was an American oil man, founder of the Allied Oil Company, Inc. of Cleveland, and its senior partner and secretary-treasurer until it merged with the Ashland Oil and Refining Company and he joined the Board of Ashland.

An alumnus of Cornell University, Newman became one of its major benefactors, establishing four professorships and other facilities.

== Early life ==
Born in Casnovia, Michigan, on May 4 1890, Newman spent his early years in Churchville, New York. He entered Cornell University in 1908, majoring in chemistry and spending much of his time on athletics. In February 1912 he skated the whole length of the frozen Cayuga Lake, just under forty miles. He was a member of the Bandhu Fraternity, later Phi Kappa Tau, and graduated in the Class of 1912.

== Career ==
On leaving Cornell, Newman became a Standard Oil Company trainee and was posted to Shanghai, China. He joined the Shanghai Volunteer Corps and was promoted to first lieutenant. During World War I, Newman was commissioned into the United States Army and was an organizer of petroleum distribution to US armed forces in France. In 1919, he was still a serving officer and was in charge of the gasoline distribution for the Third Army, the Army of Occupation.

In 1925 Newman was a founding partner of the Allied Oil Company, Inc. of Cleveland, and was its secretary-treasurer until 1948, when it was taken over by the Ashland Oil and Refining Company. He then became a director of Ashland.

== Philanthropist ==
Newman was a significant benefactor of Cornell, giving it millions of dollars which paid for a variety of buildings, endowed professorships, and supported the university's geological sciences faculty and its athletics facilities.

The Floyd R. Newman Laboratory for Nuclear Studies was built in 1947 and contained Cornell's first particle accelerator. In 1949, Newman gave the university one million dollars for its nuclear research, and in October 1951 he was elected as a Trustee of Cornell, succeeding Franklin W. Olin, founder of the Olin Corporation. In 1963 Newman donated the Helen Newman Hall, on the Cornell North Campus, a building of 65,000 square feet serving as the women's gymnasium and housing the women's physical education program, in honor of his wife. An endowment of the post of Helen Newman Director of Women's Athletics was also named for her. Among Newman's other gifts to Cornell were four endowed professorships.

In 1982, the 150-acre Arboretum of the Cornell Botanic Gardens was named in Newman's honor. He was an emeritus trustee and volunteer leader at Cornell until his death in 1990, aged almost 100, and left a trust for his daughter which endowed the position of Elizabeth Newman Wilds Director of the Botanic Gardens.
