= Grant, Michigan =

- City
- Location of Grant within Newaygo County, Michigan
- Coordinates: 43°20′10.00″N 85°48′39.00″W
- Country: United States
- State: Michigan
- County: Newaygo
- Village incorporation: 1893
- City incorporation: 1969

Government
  - Mayor: Julie Hallman
  - City Manager: Kasey Jernberg

Area
  - Total: 0.68 sq mi (1.77 km^{2})
  - Land: 0.66 sq mi (1.72 km^{2})
  - Water: 0.019 sq mi (0.05 km^{2})
- Elevation: 837 ft (255 m)

Population (2020)
  - Total: 952
  - Density: 1,431.0/sq mi (552.51/km^{2})
- Time zone: UTC-5 (EST)
  - Summer (DST): UTC-4 (EDT)
- ZIP code: 49327
- Area code: 231
- FIPS code: 26-34360
- GNIS feature ID: 0627144
- Website: www.cityofgrantmi.com

Grant is a city in Newaygo County in the U.S. state of Michigan. The population was 952 at the 2020 census. The city is adjacent to Grant Township and Ashland Township. It is part of the Grand Rapids-Muskegon-Holland, Michigan combined statistical area.

== History ==
The history of Grant began in 1882, when Andrew J. Squier built the first sawmill. Soon afterward, a railroad station was built on the Chicago and Western Michigan Railroad. Squier named the station Grant Station after President and Civil War general Ulysses S. Grant. The community was also called Grant Center because of its location within the township.

On May 14, 1892, a post office was established under the name Grant Station. Grant Center was incorporated in 1893 as the village of Grant. The post office name was shortened to Grant in 1899.

At the peak of the lumber era, the sawmills shipped one million feet of lumber per year. The village of Grant was reincorporated as a city in 1969.

== Geography ==
According to the United States Census Bureau, the city has a total area of 0.67 square miles (1.74 km^{2}), of which 0.65 square miles (1.68 km^{2}) is land and 0.02 square miles (0.05 km^{2}) is water.

== Demographics ==
Historical population
Census	Pop.	Note	%±
1880	90		—
1900	214		—
1910	428		100.0%
1920	473		10.5%
1930	483		2.1%
1940	552		14.3%
1950	646		17.0%
1960	732		13.3%
1970	772		5.5%
1980	683		−11.5%
1990	764		11.9%
2000	881		15.3%
2010	894		1.5%
2020	952		6.5%
U.S. Decennial Census

=== 2010 census ===
As of the census of 2010, there were 894 people, 361 households, and 229 families living in the city. The population density was 1,375.4 inhabitants per square mile (531.0/km^{2}). There were 416 housing units at an average density of 640.0 per square mile (247.1/km^{2}). The racial makeup of the city was 93.8% White, 0.1% African American, 0.4% Native American, 0.3% Asian, 4.5% from other races, and 0.8% from two or more races. Hispanic or Latino of any race were 13.3% of the population.

There were 361 households, of which 37.7% had children under the age of 18 living with them, 41.0% were married couples living together, 17.2% had a female householder with no husband present, 5.3% had a male householder with no wife present, and 36.6% were non-families. 31.9% of all households were made up of individuals, and 18.5% had someone living alone who was 65 years of age or older. The average household size was 2.46, and the average family size was 3.06.

The median age in the city was 31.9 years. 29.5% of residents were under the age of 18; 9.2% were between the ages of 18 and 24; 24.8% were from 25 to 44; 20.9% were from 45 to 64; and 15.7% were 65 years of age or older. The gender makeup of the city was 46.2% male and 53.8% female.

=== 2000 census ===
As of the census of 2000, there were 881 people, 323 households, and 214 families living in the city. The population density was 1,350.1 inhabitants per square mile (521.3/km^{2}). There were 344 housing units at an average density of 527.2 per square mile (203.6/km^{2}). The racial makeup of the city was 95.12% White, 0.23% African American, 0.23% Native American, 0.11% Asian, 2.04% from other races, and 2.27% from two or more races. Hispanic or Latino of any race were 10.33% of the population.

There were 323 households, out of which 37.5% had children under the age of 18 living with them, 48.0% were married couples living together, 14.6% had a female householder with no husband present, and 33.7% were non-families. 29.1% of all households were made up of individuals, and 19.2% had someone living alone who was 65 years of age or older. The average household size was 2.59, and the average family size was 3.22.

In the city, the population was spread out, with 29.6% under the age of 18, 11.2% from 18 to 24, 24.6% from 25 to 44, 16.2% from 45 to 64, and 18.3% who were 65 years of age or older. The median age was 32 years. For every 100 females, there were 86.3 males. For every 100 females age 18 and over, there were 76.1 males.

The median income for a household in the city was $50,972, and the median income for a family was $44,583. Males had a median income of $41,250 versus $26,696 for females. The per capita income for the city was $15,308. About 11.1% of families and 20.8% of the population were below the poverty line, including 26.1% of those under age 18 and 19.9% of those age 65 or over.

== Government ==
The city is served by Grant Public School District and the Grant Area District Library.

== Historical sites ==
- Grant Depot and Water Tower

=== Major highways ===
- M-37
