= Gerald R. Ford Freeway =

The Gerald R. Ford Freeway refers to Interstate Highways named for former President Gerald R. Ford in Omaha (where he was born) and Michigan (where he grew up and was a Congressman):

- Interstate 480 (Nebraska–Iowa)
- Interstate 196 (Michigan)
