= Kent City High School =

Location
- 351 North Main Street; Kent City, Michigan 49330; United States; 43.2261°N 85.7536°W

Information
- Type: Public high school
- School district: Kent City Community Schools
- Superintendent: Bill Crane
- Principal: Jordan Stuhan
- Teaching staff: 28 (Full Time) (2025-2026)
- Enrollment: 384 (2025-2026)
- Student to teacher ratio: 24:1(2025-2026)
- Colors: Scarlet and white
- Athletics conference: Central State Athletic Association
- Nickname: Eagles
- Website: kentcityschools.org/highschool/

Kent City High School is a public high school located in Kent City, Michigan (U.S.). The principal of the school is Jordan Stuhan. The athletic teams are known as the Eagles. They compete in the Central State Activities Association in its White Division.

The first graduating class was 1909.

== Student Demographics ==
Kent City High School had 384 students enrolled in the 2025-2026 school year. 43.8% of the students were econonomically disadvantaged, resulting in free school breakfast and lunch for all students.

== Extracurriculars and Sports ==
Kent City High School has a large pool of extracurriculars for students to choose from.

Extracurricular options for high school students include band, drama, and National Honor Society.

For athletics, they offer both men's and women's basketball, golf, and soccer. Specific for men, they offer baseball and football. Specific for women, they offer sideline cheer, softball, and volleyball. Coed options include bowling, cross country, marching band, track, and wrestling.

In the 2025 season, the Kent City High School football team went 4-0 (W-L) in conference play, and 12-1 (W-L) in overall play. They were eliminated in the semi-finals game against Kingsley High School.

The Kent City Marching Eagles placed 4th in Flight 5 competition in the MCBA in the 2025 season. They have previously won state championships in this division in 2019, 2021, and 2022.
