= Bridgeton Township, Michigan =

- Township
- Location within the state of Michigan Bridgeton Township, Michigan (the United States)
- Coordinates: 43°20′8″N 85°58′14″W
- Country: United States
- State: Michigan
- County: Newaygo

Area
  - Total: 35.9 sq mi (93.1 km^{2})
  - Land: 35.5 sq mi (91.9 km^{2})
  - Water: 0.46 sq mi (1.2 km^{2})
- Elevation: 679 ft (207 m)

Population (2020)
  - Total: 2,224
  - Density: 62.7/sq mi (24.2/km^{2})
- Time zone: UTC-5 (Eastern (EST))
  - Summer (DST): UTC-4 (EDT)
- FIPS code: 26-10500
- GNIS feature ID: 1625978
- Website: bridgetontownshipmi.gov

Bridgeton Township is a civil township of Newaygo County in the U.S. state of Michigan. As of the 2020 census, the township population was 2,224.

== Geography ==
According to the United States Census Bureau, the township has a total area of 36.0 square miles (93 km^{2}), of which 35.5 square miles (92 km^{2}) is land and 0.5 square miles (1.3 km^{2}) (1.34%) is water.

== History ==
Bridgeton, Township was established in 1852.

== Demographics ==
As of the census of 2000, there were 2,098 people, 737 households, and 558 families residing in the township. The population density was 59.1 inhabitants per square mile (22.8/km^{2}). There were 812 housing units at an average density of 22.9 per square mile (8.8/km^{2}). The racial makeup of the township was 95.66% White, 0.24% African American, 0.57% Native American, 0.19% Asian, 0.86% from other races, and 2.48% from two or more races. Hispanic or Latino of any race were 1.95% of the population.

There were 737 households, out of which 39.6% had children under the age of 18 living with them, 61.3% were married couples living together, 9.0% had a female householder with no husband present, and 24.2% were non-families. 18.7% of all households were made up of individuals, and 5.7% had someone living alone who was 65 years of age or older. The average household size was 2.85 and the average family size was 3.23.

In the township the population was spread out, with 31.0% under the age of 18, 8.3% from 18 to 24, 32.2% from 25 to 44, 20.3% from 45 to 64, and 8.2% who were 65 years of age or older. The median age was 33 years. For every 100 females, there were 102.3 males. For every 100 females age 18 and over, there were 101.1 males.

The median income for a household in the township was $38,750, and the median income for a family was $43,317. Males had a median income of $34,148 versus $24,853 for females. The per capita income for the township was $17,173. About 9.1% of families and 11.8% of the population were below the poverty line, including 15.0% of those under age 18 and 11.0% of those age 65 or over.

== See also ==
- Grant Public School District
