= Michigan's Longest Garage Sale =

Annual yard sale event in Michigan, US

Michigan's Longest Garage Sale is an annual event that occurs along a 180-mile (290 km) stretch of U.S. Highway 12 from New Buffalo to Detroit, Michigan. In 2022, 280 locations such as homes, farms, and businesses were registered and participating in the event. The event began in 2003.
