= Ashland Township, Michigan =

- Township
- Location within the state of Michigan Ashland Township, Michigan (the United States)
- Coordinates: 43°20′33″N 85°51′43″W
- Country: United States
- State: Michigan
- County: Newaygo

Area
  - Total: 35.3 sq mi (91.4 km^{2})
  - Land: 34.9 sq mi (90.4 km^{2})
  - Water: 0.39 sq mi (1.0 km^{2})
- Elevation: 771 ft (235 m)

Population (2020)
  - Total: 2,764
  - Density: 79.2/sq mi (30.6/km^{2})
- Time zone: UTC-5 (Eastern (EST))
  - Summer (DST): UTC-4 (EDT)
- FIPS code: 26-03700
- GNIS feature ID: 1625854

Ashland Township is a civil township of Newaygo County in the U.S. state of Michigan. As of the 2020 census, the township population was 2,764. The city of Grant is adjacent to the township. The township was established in 1854.

== Communities ==
- Dickinson was an unincorporated place in this township. It had a post office from 1888 until 1901.

== Geography ==
According to the United States Census Bureau, the township has a total area of 35.3 square miles (91 km^{2}), of which 34.9 square miles (90 km^{2}) is land and 0.4 square miles (1.0 km^{2}) (1.11%) is water.

== Demographics ==
As of the census of 2000, there were 2,570 people, 839 households, and 665 families residing in the township. The population density was 73.6 inhabitants per square mile (28.4/km^{2}). There were 944 housing units at an average density of 27.0 per square mile (10.4/km^{2}). The racial makeup of the township was 93.50% White, 0.54% African American, 0.51% Native American, 0.23% Asian, 3.58% from other races, and 1.63% from two or more races. Hispanic or Latino of any race were 9.42% of the population.

There were 839 households, out of which 42.9% had children under the age of 18 living with them, 67.5% were married couples living together, 8.2% had a female householder with no husband present, and 20.7% were non-families. 16.3% of all households were made up of individuals, and 5.6% had someone living alone who was 65 years of age or older. The average household size was 3.05 and the average family size was 3.42.

In the township the population was spread out, with 33.7% under the age of 18, 8.0% from 18 to 24, 31.0% from 25 to 44, 19.4% from 45 to 64, and 7.9% who were 65 years of age or older. The median age was 32 years. For every 100 females, there were 100.9 males. For every 100 females age 18 and over, there were 101.1 males.

The median income for a household in the township was $42,151, and the median income for a family was $46,098. Males had a median income of $36,369 versus $25,347 for females. The per capita income for the township was $18,232. About 8.6% of families and 12.5% of the population were below the poverty line, including 16.5% of those under age 18 and 1.9% of those age 65 or over.

== See also ==
- Grant Public School District
