= Grant Township, Newaygo County, Michigan =

Grant Township, Michigan
- Township
- Location within the state of Michigan Grant Township, Michigan (the United States)
- Coordinates: 43°20′52″N 85°44′47″W
- Country: United States
- State: Michigan
- County: Newaygo

Area
  - Total: 36.1 sq mi (93.4 km^{2})
  - Land: 35.9 sq mi (93.0 km^{2})
  - Water: 0.15 sq mi (0.4 km^{2})
- Elevation: 807 ft (246 m)

Population (2020)
  - Total: 3,298
  - Density: 91.8/sq mi (35.5/km^{2})
- Time zone: UTC-5 (Eastern (EST))
  - Summer (DST): UTC-4 (EDT)
- ZIP code: 49327
- Area code: 231
- FIPS code: 26-34380
- GNIS feature ID: 1626385

Grant Township is a civil township of Newaygo County in the U.S. state of Michigan. As of the 2020 census, the township population was 3,298. The city of Grant is adjacent to the township.

== Geography ==
According to the United States Census Bureau, the township has a total area of 36.1 square miles (93 km^{2}), of which 35.9 square miles (93 km^{2}) is land and 0.2 square miles (0.52 km^{2}) (0.47%) is water.

== Demographics ==
As of the census of 2000, there were 3,130 people, 1,015 households, and 830 families residing in the township. The population density was 87.2 inhabitants per square mile (33.7/km^{2}). There were 1,113 housing units at an average density of 31.0 per square mile (12.0/km^{2}). The racial makeup of the township was 92.27% White, 0.35% African American, 0.42% Native American, 0.13% Asian, 5.11% from other races, and 1.73% from two or more races. Hispanic or Latino of any race were 11.60% of the population.

There were 1,015 households, out of which 42.3% had children under the age of 18 living with them, 69.9% were married couples living together, 7.9% had a female householder with no husband present, and 18.2% were non-families. 14.8% of all households were made up of individuals, and 4.8% had someone living alone who was 65 years of age or older. The average household size was 3.05 and the average family size was 3.39.

In the township the population was spread out, with 32.6% under the age of 18, 8.0% from 18 to 24, 30.1% from 25 to 44, 21.6% from 45 to 64, and 7.8% who were 65 years of age or older. The median age was 33 years. For every 100 females, there were 105.1 males. For every 100 females age 18 and over, there were 99.2 males.

The median income for a household in the township was $41,295, and the median income for a family was $50,545. Males had a median income of $45,750 versus $22,099 for females. The per capita income for the township was $15,910. About 4.1% of families and 4.3% of the population were below the poverty line, including 4.4% of those under age 18 and 4.9% of those age 65 or over.

== See also ==
- Grant Public School District
