= Grant Public Schools =

School district in Michigan

Address
- 148 South Elder Avenue Grant, Newaygo County, Michigan, 49327; United States
- Coordinates: 43°20′02.00″N 85°48′07.95″W

District information
- Type: Public school district
- Grades: Pre-Kindergarten-12
- Superintendent: Kevin Akin
- Schools: 5
- Budget: $23,604,000 2022-2023 expenditures
- NCES District ID: 2616500

Students and staff
- Students: 1,438 (2024-2025)
- Teachers: 85.11 (on an FTE basis) (2024-2025)
- Staff: 192.7 FTE (2024-2025)
- Student–teacher ratio: 16.9 (2024-2025)
- District mascot: Tigers
- Colors: Orange & Black

Other information
- Website: www.grantps.net

Grant Public Schools is a public school district in West Michigan. In Newaygo County, it serves Grant and parts of the townships of Ashland, Bridgeton, Ensley, and Grant. In Kent County, it serves parts of Solon Township and Tyrone Township. In Muskegon County, it serves parts of Casnovia Township and Moorland Township. It is a constituent of the Newaygo County Regional Educational Service Agency, (NCRESA) which is Newaygo County's Intermediate School District.

== History ==
The former Grant High School building was constructed around 1921.

The current Grant High School opened in fall 1963. The Grant Performing Arts Center, a 794-seat auditorium, was added to it in 2004. The district's middle school opened in fall 1991.

== Schools ==
Grant Public Schools' buildings are located on a campus at the intersection of East State Road and South Elder Avenue. Grant's public library shares the site. The primary school and elementary school share an address, although they are in separate buildings.

Schools in Grant Public Schools district
School	Address	Notes
Grant High School	331 E. State St., Grant	Grades 9–12. Built 1963.
Grant Middle School	96 E. 120th St., Grant	Grades 5–8. Built 1991.
Grant Elementary School	160 E. State St., Grant	Grades 2-4
Grant Primary Center	160 E. State St., Grant	Grades PreK–1
