= Kent City, Michigan =

- Village
- Village of Kent City
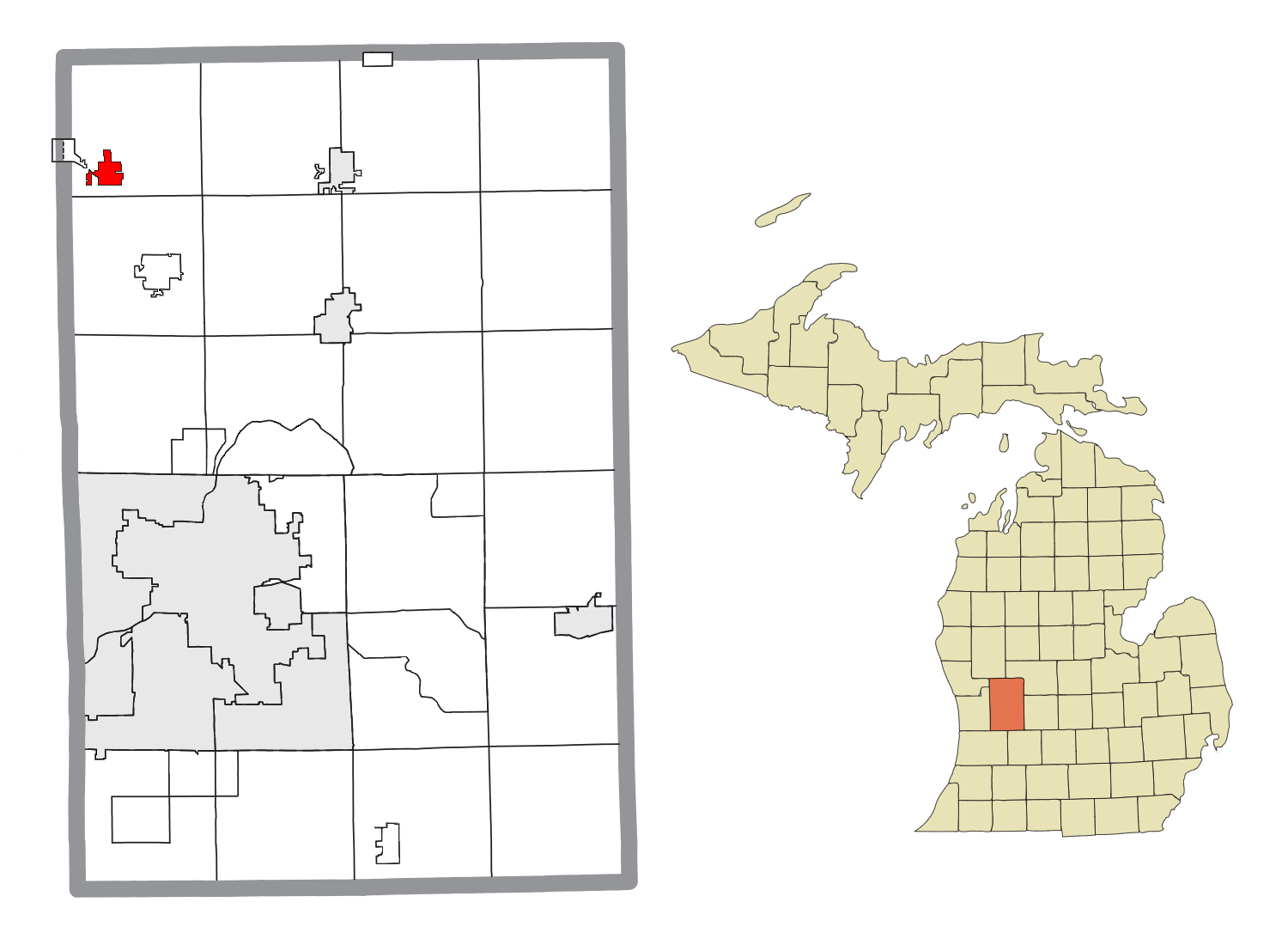
- Location within Kent County

- Location within the state of Michigan Location within the United States
- Coordinates: 43°13′09″N 85°45′13″W
- Country: United States
- State: Michigan
- County: Kent
- Township: Tyrone
- Incorporated: 1908

Government
  - Type: Village council
  - President: Bert Rose
  - Clerk: Ashley Scudder

Area
  - Total: 1.34 sq mi (3.47 km^{2})
  - Land: 1.34 sq mi (3.47 km^{2})
  - Water: 0 sq mi (0.00 km^{2})
- Elevation: 810 ft (247 m)

Population (2020)
  - Total: 1,262
  - Density: 942.2/sq mi (363.79/km^{2})
- Time zone: UTC-5 (Eastern (EST))
  - Summer (DST): UTC-4 (EDT)
- ZIP code(s): 49330
- Area code: 616
- FIPS code: 26-42780
- GNIS feature ID: 0629599
- Website: Official website

Kent City is a village in Kent County in the U.S. state of Michigan. The population was 1,262 at the 2020 census. The village is located within Tyrone Township.

The village is part of the Grand Rapids metropolitan area and is located about 20 miles (32.2 km) north of the city of Grand Rapids.

== Geography ==
According to the U.S. Census Bureau, the village has a total area of 1.34 square miles (3.47 km^{2}), all land.

=== Major highways ===
- M-37 passes northwest through the southwestern portion of the village.
- M-46 (Muskegon Street) runs west–east through the center of the village and briefly runs concurrently with M-37.

=== Climate ===
This climatic region is typified by large seasonal temperature differences, with warm to hot (and often humid) summers and cold (sometimes severely cold) winters. According to the Köppen Climate Classification system, Kent City has a humid continental climate, abbreviated "Dfb" on climate maps.

== Education ==
The village of Kent City is served by Kent City Community Schools, which serves a much larger area including several townships in Kent County and smaller areas extending west into Muskegon County and Ottawa County. The district is headquartered in Kent City and includes Kent City High School, Kent City Middle School, and Kent City Elementary School within its boundaries.

The Tyrone Township Branch of the Kent District Library is located in Kent City.

== Demographics ==
Historical population
Census	Pop.	Note	%±
1910	467		—
1920	428		−8.4%
1930	484		13.1%
1940	440		−9.1%
1950	506		15.0%
1960	617		21.9%
1970	686		11.2%
1980	860		25.4%
1990	899		4.5%
2000	1,061		18.0%
2010	1,057		−0.4%
2020	1,262		19.4%
U.S. Decennial Census

=== 2020 census ===
As of the 2020 United States census, the village had a population of 1,262 people. The racial makeup was 90.5% White, 1.3% Black, 0% Asian, 0% Native American, and 5.6% from two or more races. Hispanic or Latino people of any race were 22.6% of the population.

=== 2010 census ===
As of the census of 2010, there were 1,057 people, 373 households, and 268 families living in the village. The population density was 800.8 inhabitants per square mile (309.2/km^{2}). There were 407 housing units at an average density of 308.3 per square mile (119.0/km^{2}). The racial makeup of the village was 88.8% White, 0.9% African American, 0.3% Native American, 0.2% Asian, 7.7% from other races, and 2.1% from two or more races. Hispanic or Latino of any race were 17.8% of the population.

There were 373 households, of which 43.7% had children under the age of 18 living with them, 49.9% were married couples living together, 14.2% had a female householder with no husband present, 7.8% had a male householder with no wife present, and 28.2% were non-families. 23.6% of all households were made up of individuals, and 7% had someone living alone who was 65 years of age or older. The average household size was 2.83 and the average family size was 3.33.

The median age in the village was 30.6 years. 30.7% of residents were under the age of 18; 9.8% were between the ages of 18 and 24; 28.9% were from 25 to 44; 22.8% were from 45 to 64; and 7.7% were 65 years of age or older. The gender makeup of the village was 48.2% male and 51.8% female.

=== 2000 census ===
As of the census of 2000, there were 1,061 people, 373 households, and 270 families living in the village. The population density was 969.2 inhabitants per square mile (374.2/km^{2}). There were 392 housing units at an average density of 358.1 per square mile (138.3/km^{2}). The racial makeup of the village was 94.82% White, 0.28% African American, 0.19% Native American, 3.20% from other races, and 1.51% from two or more races. Hispanic or Latino of any race were 11.88% of the population.

There were 373 households, out of which 46.1% had children under the age of 18 living with them, 50.9% were married couples living together, 15.8% had a female householder with no husband present, and 27.6% were non-families. 23.9% of all households were made up of individuals, and 8.6% had someone living alone who was 65 years of age or older. The average household size was 2.84 and the average family size was 3.33.

In the village, the population was spread out, with 34.0% under the age of 18, 11.5% from 18 to 24, 29.6% from 25 to 44, 16.2% from 45 to 64, and 8.7% who were 65 years of age or older. The median age was 28 years. For every 100 females, there were 90.5 males. For every 100 females age 18 and over, there were 87.2 males.

The median income for a household in the village was $35,341, and the median income for a family was $42,375. Males had a median income of $33,750 versus $24,167 for females. The per capita income for the village was $13,084. About 11.1% of families and 12.0% of the population were below the poverty line, including 15.0% of those under age 18 and 14.1% of those age 65 or over.

== Superfund site ==
The Kent City Mobile Home Park was listed as a federal Superfund Site. A buried 55-gallon drum containing dry cleaning chemicals contaminated both the surrounding soil and groundwater, including the well servicing the mobile home park. Cleanup efforts began in 1984 and included replacing the contaminated well, removing the drum and the contaminated soil, and ongoing groundwater monitoring. The United States Environmental Protection Agency removed the site's Superfund status in 1995.
