= 2026 Michigan House of Representatives election =

- November 5, 2026

All 110 seats in the Michigan House of Representatives 56 seats needed for a majority

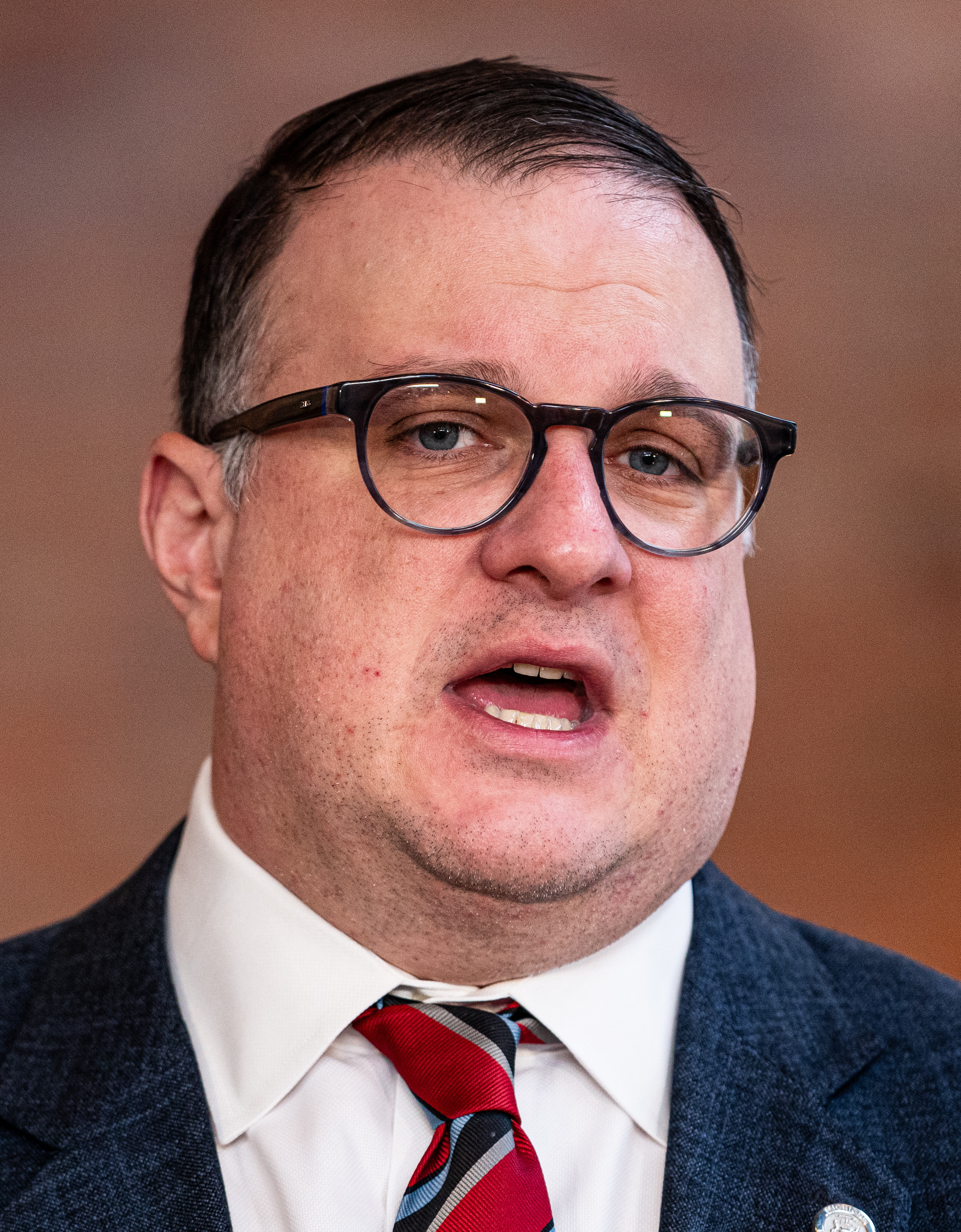
	Majority party	Minority party
Leader	Ranjeev Puri	Matt Hall
Party	Democratic	Republican
Leader since	January 8, 2025	January 11, 2023
Leader's seat	24th–Canton	42nd–Richland Township
Last election	52 seats, 48.52%	58 seats, 51.04%
Seats won	63 seats	47 seats
Seat change	▲11	▼11
- Democratic hold Democratic gain Republican hold Democratic: 50–60% 60–70% 70–80% 80–90% >90% Republican: 50–60% 60–70% 70–80%
Speaker before election
Matt Hall
Republican
Elected Speaker
TBD

The 2026 Michigan House of Representatives elections were held on November 3, 2026, alongside the 2026 United States elections.

All 110 seats in the Michigan House of Representatives were elected.

== Predictions ==
Source	Ranking	As of
Sabato's Crystal Ball	Tossup	January 22, 2026
State Navigate	Solid D (flip)	August 27, 2026

== Generic ballot polling ==
Poll source	Date(s) administered	Sample size (Note: Key: A – all adults RV – registered voters LV – likely voters V – unclear)	Margin of error	Republican	Democratic	Undecided
Cygnal (R)/Beacon Research (D) (Note: Poll sponsored by Michigan Enjoyer)	September 18–21, 2026	600 (LV)	± 4.0%	40%	46%	14%

== Retirements ==
=== Democrats ===
1. 2nd district: Tullio Liberati retired
2. 4th district: Karen Whitsett retired
3. 5th distrcit: Regina Weiss retired
4. 6th district: Natalie Price retired and ran for the state senate
5. 9th district: Joe Tate retired
6. 11th district: Donavan McKinney retired and ran for the U.S. House of Representatives
7. 15th district: Erin Byrnes retired and ran for the state senate
8. 18th District: Jason Hoskins retired and ran for the state senate
9. 22nd district: Matt Koleszar retired and ran for the state senate
10. 31st district: Reggie Miller retired
11. 41st district: Julie Rogers retired and ran for the state senate
12. 74th district: Kara Hope retired
13. 80th district: Phil Skaggs retired and ran for the state senate
14. 84th district: Carol Glanville retired and ran for the state senate

=== Republicans ===
1. 54th district: Donni Steele retired and ran for the state senate
2. 59th district: Doug Wozniak retired and ran for the state senate
3. 63rd district: Jay DeBoyer retired and ran for lieutenant governor
4. 78th district: Gina Johnsen retired and ran for the state senate
5. 89th district: Luke Meerman retired
6. 90th district: Bryan Posthumus retired
7. 97th district: Matthew Bierlein retired and ran for the state senate
8. 101st district: Joseph Fox retired and ran for the state senate
9. 108th district: David Prestin retired and ran for the state senate

== Incumbents defeated ==
=== In primary election ===
One Democrat lost renomination.

==== Democratic ====
1. 8th district: Helena Scott lost renomination to Chris Gilmer-Hill

=== In general election ===
10 Republicans lost re-election.

==== Republican ====
1. 27th district: Rylee Linting lost re-election to Jaime Churches
2. 28th district: Jamie Thompson lost re-election to Sherry Berecz
3. 44th district: Steve Frisbie lost re-election to Jim Haadsma
4. 46th district: Kathy Schmaltz lost re-election to Jan Maino
5. 55th district: Mark Tisdel lost re-election to Alex Hawkins
6. 57th district: Thomas Kuhn lost re-election to Tom Turner
7. 58th district: Ron Robinson lost re-election to Katrina Manetta
8. 68th district: David Martin lost re-election to Matt Schlinker
9. 86th district: Nancy DeBoer lost re-election to Joseph McClusky
10. 109th district: Karl Bohnak lost re-election to Anna Aho Rink

== Results summary ==
Italics denote an open seat held by the incumbent party; bold text denotes a gain for a party.

† - Incumbent not seeking re-election or term-limited

District	2024 Pres.	Incumbent	Party	Elected Representative	Outcome
1	D+58.5	Tyrone Carter	Dem	Tyrone Carter	Dem Hold
2	D+1.5	Tullio Liberati†	Dem	Joanna Whaley	Dem Hold
3	R+5.1	Alabas Farhat	Dem	Alabas Farhat	Dem Hold
4	D+86.3	Karen Whitsett†	Dem	Regina Ross	Dem Hold
5	D+75.8	Regina Weiss†	Dem	Candace Calloway	Dem Hold
6	D+32.3	Natalie Price†	Dem	Melanie Macey	Dem Hold
7	D+57.3	Tonya Myers Phillips	Dem	Tonya Myers Phillips	Dem Hold
8	D+76.8	Helena Scott	Dem	Chris Gilmer-Hill	Dem Hold
9	D+83.6	Joe Tate†	Dem	Willie Burton	Dem Hold
10	D+37.8	Veronica Paiz	Dem	Veronica Paiz	Dem Hold
11	D+61.6	Donavan McKinney†	Dem	Kimberly Fisher	Dem Hold
12	D+35.9	Kimberly Edwards	Dem	Kimberly Edwards	Dem Hold
13	R+1.9	Mai Xiong	Dem	Mai Xiong	Dem Hold
14	D+11.2	Mike McFall	Dem	Mike McFall	Dem Hold
15	R+2.1	Erin Byrnes†	Dem	Jalal Abdallah	Dem Hold
16	D+49.1	Stephanie Young	Dem	Stephanie Young	Dem Hold
17	D+33.4	Laurie Pohutsky	Dem	Laurie Pohutsky	Dem Hold
18	D+53.7	Jason Hoskins†	Dem	Kelly Garrett	Dem Hold
19	D+32.0	Samantha Steckloff	Dem	Samantha Steckloff	Dem Hold
20	D+4.7	Noah Arbit	Dem	Noah Arbit	Dem Hold
21	D+12.3	Kelly Breen	Dem	Kelly Breen	Dem Hold
22	D+3.3	Matt Koleszar†	Dem	Lisa McIntyre	Dem Hold
23	D+26.1	Jason Morgan	Dem	Jason Morgan	Dem Hold
24	D+15.5	Ranjeev Puri	Dem	Ranjeev Puri	Dem Hold
25	D+13.6	Peter Herzberg	Dem	Peter Herzberg	Dem Hold
26	D+25.5	Dylan Wegela	Dem	Dylan Wegela	Dem Hold
27	R+8.4	Rylee Linting	Rep	**Jaime Churches**	**Dem Gain**
28	R+12.3	Jamie Thompson	Rep	**Sherry Berecz**	**Dem Gain**
29	R+12.5	James DeSana	Rep	James DeSana	Rep Hold
30	R+25.3	William Bruck	Rep	William Bruck	Rep Hold
31	R+2.8	Reggie Miller†	Dem	Shannon Dare Wayne	Dem Hold
32	D+51.3	Jimmie Wilson Jr.	Dem	Jimmie Wilson Jr.	Dem Hold
33	D+48.0	Morgan Foreman	Dem	Morgan Foreman	Dem Hold
34	R+21.8	Nancy Jenkins-Arno	Rep	Nancy Jenkins-Arno	Rep Hold
35	R+47.0	Jennifer Wortz	Rep	Jennifer Wortz	Rep Hold
36	R+34.4	Steve Carra	Rep	Steve Carra	Rep Hold
37	R+23.1	Brad Paquette	Rep	Brad Paquette	Rep Hold
38	D+9.1	Joey Andrews	Dem	Joey Andrews	Dem Hold
39	R+23.2	Pauline Wendzel	Rep	Pauline Wendzel	Rep Hold
40	D+18.1	Matthew Longjohn	Dem	Matthew Longjohn	Dem Hold
41	D+51.6	Julie Rogers†	Dem	Jen Strebs	Dem Hold
42	R+8.9	Matt Hall	Rep	Matt Hall	Rep Hold
43	R+40.9	Rachelle Smit	Rep	Rachelle Smit	Rep Hold
44	R+3.9	Steve Frisbie	Rep	**Jim Haadsma**	**Dem Gain**
45	R+34.6	Sarah Lightner	Rep	Sarah Lightner	Rep Hold
46	R+2.2	Kathy Schmaltz	Rep	**Jan Maino**	**Dem Gain**
47	D+23.9	Carrie Rheingans	Dem	Carrie Rheingans	Dem Hold
48	D+6.7	Jennifer Conlin	Dem	Jennifer Conlin	Dem Hold
49	R+9.8	Ann Bollin	Rep	Ann Bollin	Rep Hold
50	R+31.7	Jason Woolford	Rep	Jason Woolford	Rep Hold
51	R+19.8	Matt Maddock	Rep	Matt Maddock	Rep Hold
52	R+16.8	Mike Harris	Rep	Mike Harris	Rep Hold
53	D+28.8	Brenda Carter	Dem	Brenda Carter	Dem Hold
54	R+1.0	Donni Steele†	Rep	**Sarah Pounds**	**Dem Gain**
55	R+0.7	Mark Tisdel	Rep	**Alex Hawkins**	**Dem Gain**
56	D+13.3	Sharon MacDonell	Dem	Sharon MacDonell	Dem Hold
57	R+17.6	Thomas Kuhn	Rep	**Tom Turner**	**Dem Gain**
58	R+12.9	Ron Robinson	Rep	**Katrina Manetta**	**Dem Gain**
59	R+32.0	Doug Wozniak†	Rep	Sylvia Grot	Rep Hold
60	R+22.6	Joseph Aragona	Rep	Joseph Aragona	Rep Hold
61	R+5.2	Denise Mentzer	Dem	Denise Mentzer	Dem Hold
62	R+10.9	Alicia St. Germaine	Rep	Alicia St. Germaine	Rep Hold
63	R+33.1	Jay DeBoyer†	Rep	Pamela Hornberger	Rep Hold
64	R+24.3	Joseph Pavlov	Rep	Joseph Pavlov	Rep Hold
65	R+46.9	Jaime Greene	Rep	Jaime Greene	Rep Hold
66	R+31.9	Josh Schriver	Rep	Josh Schriver	Rep Hold
67	R+26.3	Phil Green	Rep	Phil Green	Rep Hold
68	R+9.2	David Martin	Rep	**Matt Schlinker**	**Dem Gain**
69	D+8.1	Jasper Martus	Dem	Jasper Martus	Dem Hold
70	D+55.4	Cynthia Neeley	Dem	Cynthia Neeley	Dem Hold
71	R+23.9	Brian BeGole	Rep	Brian BeGole	Rep Hold
72	R+14.0	Mike Mueller	Rep	Mike Mueller	Rep Hold
73	D+9.4	Julie Brixie	Dem	Julie Brixie	Dem Hold
74	D+33.8	Kara Hope†	Dem	Harold Pope	Dem Hold
75	D+19.1	Penelope Tsernoglou	Dem	Penelope Tsernoglou	Dem Hold
76	R+0.4	Angela Witwer	Dem	Angela Witwer	Dem Hold
77	D+22.7	Emily Dievendorf	Dem	Emily Dievendorf	Dem Hold
78	R+30.6	Gina Johnsen†	Rep	Brandon Strong	Rep Hold
79	R+27.4	Angela Rigas	Rep	Angela Rigas	Rep Hold
80	D+17.9	Phil Skaggs†	Dem	Lily Cheng-Schulting	Dem Hold
81	D+14.4	Stephen Wooden	Dem	Stephen Wooden	Dem Hold
82	D+51.1	Kristian Grant	Dem	Kristian Grant	Dem Hold
83	D+8.5	John Fitzgerald	Dem	John Fitzgerald	Dem Hold
84	D+11.1	Carol Glanville†	Dem	Khristian Silvis	Dem Hold
85	R+33.4	Bradley Slagh	Rep	Bradley Slagh	Rep Hold
86	R+0.3	Nancy De Boer	Rep	**Joseph McClusky**	**Dem Gain**
87	D+17.0	Will Snyder	Dem	Will Snyder	Dem Hold
88	R+8.2	Greg VanWoerkom	Rep	Greg VanWoerkom	Rep Hold
89	R+33.2	Luke Meerman†	Rep	Joe Moss	Rep Hold
90	R+18.4	Bryan Posthumus†	Rep	Lynn Afendoulis	Rep Hold
91	R+37.0	Pat Outman	Rep	Pat Outman	Rep Hold
92	R+12.2	Jerry Neyer	Rep	Jerry Neyer	Rep Hold
93	R+31.8	Tim Kelly	Rep	Tim Kelly	Rep Hold
94	D+30.6	Amos O'Neal	Dem	Amos O'Neal	Dem Hold
95	R+17.3	Bill G. Schuette	Rep	Bill G. Schuette	Rep Hold
96	R+12.0	Timothy Beson	Rep	Timothy Beson	Rep Hold
97	R+29.7	Matthew Bierlein†	Rep	Briar Bearss	Rep Hold
98	R+46.4	Gregory Alexander	Rep	Gregory Alexander	Rep Hold
99	R+38.5	Mike Hoadley	Rep	Mike Hoadley	Rep Hold
100	R+37.0	Tom Kunse	Rep	Tom Kunse	Rep Hold
101	R+37.2	Joseph Fox†	Rep	Jaxon Deur	Rep Hold
102	R+19.9	Curt VanderWall	Rep	Curt VanderWall	Rep Hold
103	D+7.1	Betsy Coffia	Dem	Betsy Coffia	Dem Hold
104	R+25.1	John Roth	Rep	John Roth	Rep Hold
105	R+38.9	Ken Borton	Rep	Ken Borton	Rep Hold
106	R+33.8	Cam Cavitt	Rep	Cam Cavitt	Rep Hold
107	R+15.4	Parker Fairbairn	Rep	Parker Fairbairn	Rep Hold
108	R+32.2	David Prestin†	Rep	Larry Johnson	Rep Hold
109	R+0.6	Karl Bohnak	Rep	**Anna Aho Rink**	**Dem Gain**
110	R+23.9	Gregory Markkanen	Rep	Gregory Markkanen	Rep Hold

== Election results by district ==
All results below are from the certified election results posted by the Secretary of State.

=== District 1 ===
The incumbent Democrat Tyrone Carter, who was re-elected with 81.64% of the vote in 2024, ran for re-election and defeated primary challenges from disability rights advocate Teddy Dorsette III and Jermaine Tobey. Valerie Whittaker ran unopposed for the Republican nomination. This was a rematch of the 2024 election.

Democratic primary results
Party	Candidate	Votes	%
Democratic	Tyrone Carter (incumbent)	5,248	69.62
Democratic	Teddy Dorsette III	1,345	17.84
Democratic	Jermaine Tobey	945	12.54
Total votes		7,538	100.0

Republican primary results
Party	Candidate	Votes	%
Republican	Valerie Whittaker	487	100.0
Total votes		487	100.0

General election results
Party	Candidate	Votes	%
Democratic	Tyrone Carter (incumbent)	18,521	89.86
Republican	Valerie Whittaker	2,089	10.14
Total votes		20,610	100.0
Democratic hold			

=== District 2 ===
The incumbent Democrat Tullio Liberati Jr., who was re-elected with 51.82% of the vote in 2024, retired. Frank Liberati, the incumbent's brother and a former state representative, as well as Gary Schlack, an Allen Park city councilor, ran to succeed him. Joanna Whaley, an LGBTQIA+ activist and former pastor, defeated both candidates in the August 4th primary. Whaley had received endorsements from Michigan state legislators Stephanie Chang and Laurie Pohutsky, as well as U.S. representative Sarah McBride, the organizations Run for Something and LGBTQ Victory Fund, and multiple caucuses in the Michigan Democratic Party. Ron Kokinda defeated Zacharia Ortiz in the Republican primary. Whaley defeated Kokinda in the general election and will become Michigan's first transgender state legislator.

Democratic primary results
Party	Candidate	Votes	%
Democratic	Joanna Whaley	6,484	56.36
Democratic	Frank Liberati	3,944	34.29
Democratic	Gary Schlack	1,075	9.35
Total votes		11,503	100.0

Republican primary results
Party	Candidate	Votes	%
Republican	Ron Kokinda	3,177	74.37
Republican	Zacharia Ortiz	1,095	25.63
Total votes		4,272	100.0

General election results
Party	Candidate	Votes	%
Democratic	Joanna Whaley	22,356	62.49
Republican	Ron Kokinda	13,417	37.51
Total votes		35,773	100.0
Democratic hold			

=== District 3 ===
The incumbent Democrat Alabas Farhat, who was re-elected with 67.91% of the vote in 2024, ran for re-election. Farhat defeated primary challenges from 2025 Dearborn City Council candidate Othman Ali Alaansi and former Dearborn Board of Education member Hussein Berry. Gus Tarraf ran unopposed in the Republican primary.

Democratic primary results
Party	Candidate	Votes	%
Democratic	Alabas Farhat (incumbent)	8,214	63.22
Democratic	Hussein Berry	3,097	23.83
Democratic	Othman Ali Alaansi	1,683	12.95
Total votes		12,994	100.0

Republican primary results
Party	Candidate	Votes	%
Republican	Gus Tarraf	1,261	100
Total votes		1,261	100.0

General election results
Party	Candidate	Votes	%
Democratic	Alabas Farhat (incumbent)	25,062	85.38
Republican	Gus Tarraf	4,293	14.62
Total votes		29,355	100.0
Democratic hold			

=== District 4 ===
The incumbent Democrat Karen Whitsett, who was unopposed in her bid for re-election in 2024, retired. Regina Ross defeated police officer Tyus Monroe, Krystal Larsosa, and Anthony McDonald in the Democratic primary. Everett Davis ran unopposed in the Republican primary.

Democratic primary results
Party	Candidate	Votes	%
Democratic	Regina Ross	6,399	55.49
Democratic	Krystal Larsosa	3,571	30.97
Democratic	Anthony McDonald	765	6.63
Democratic	Tyus Monroe	685	5.94
Write-in		112	.97
Total votes		11,532	100.0

Republican primary results
Party	Candidate	Votes	%
Republican	Everett Davis	261	100
Total votes		261	100.0

General election results
Party	Candidate	Votes	%
Democratic	Regina Ross	27,192	96.17
Republican	Everett Davis	1,082	3.83
Total votes		28,274	100.0
Democratic hold			

=== District 5 ===
The incumbent Democrat Regina Weiss, who was re-elected with 90.57% of the vote in 2024, retired. Candace Calloway, the daughter of Detroit city councilor Angela Whitfield-Calloway, won the Democratic primary against Crystal Bailey and Soummer Moore-Crawford. Calloway had received an endorsement from Mary Sheffield, who has served as the mayor of Detroit since 2026. Chris Venable ran unopposed in the Republican primary.

Democratic primary results
Party	Candidate	Votes	%
Democratic	Candace Calloway	10,986	55.95
Democratic	Crystal Bailey	7,725	39.35
Democratic	Soummer Moore-Crawford	923	4.70
Total votes		19,634	100.0

Republican primary results
Party	Candidate	Votes	%
Republican	Chris Venable	564	100
Total votes		564	100.0

General election results
Party	Candidate	Votes	%
Democratic	Candace Calloway	36,511	92.44
Republican	Chris Venable	2,987	7.56
Total votes		39,498	100.0
Democratic hold			

=== District 6 ===
The incumbent Democrat Natalie Price, who was re-elected with 66.20% of the vote in 2024, retired and ran for the state senate. Melanie Macey defeated David Lauer and Charlie Gandy-Thompson in the Democratic primary to replace Price. Mike Steger ran unopposed for the Republican nomination.

Democratic primary results
Party	Candidate	Votes	%
Democratic	Melanie Macey	15,558	65.36
Democratic	David Lauer	6,918	29.06
Democratic	Charlie Gandy-Thompson	1,329	5.58
Total votes		23,805	100.0

Republican primary results
Party	Candidate	Votes	%
Republican	Mike Steger	5,305	100
Total votes		5,305	100.0

General election results
Party	Candidate	Votes	%
Democratic	Melanie Macey	37,775	69.49
Republican	Mike Steger	16,587	30.51
Total votes		54,362	100.0
Democratic hold			

=== District 7 ===
The incumbent Democrat Tonya Myers Phillips, who was elected with 78.91% of the vote in 2024, ran for re-election and defeated primary challenges from Seema Ahmad and Oliver Gantt. Myers Phillips had received an endorsement from Detroit mayor Mary Sheffield. Reginald Moorer ran unopposed in the Republican primary.

Democratic primary results
Party	Candidate	Votes	%
Democratic	Tonya Myers Phillips (incumbent)	7,256	63.24
Democratic	Seema Ahmad	3,517	30.65
Democratic	Oliver Gantt	701	6.11
Total votes		11,474	100.0

Republican primary results
Party	Candidate	Votes	%
Republican	Reginald Moorer	344	100
Total votes		344	100.0

General election results
Party	Candidate	Votes	%
Democratic	Tonya Myers Phillips (incumbent)	25,261	95.13
Republican	Reginald Moorer	1,294	4.87
Total votes		26,555	100.0
Democratic hold			

=== District 8 ===
The incumbent Democrat Helena Scott, who was re-elected with 87.53% of the vote in 2024, ran for re-election but was defeated by Chris Gilmer-Hill in the primary. Scott received an endorsement from Detroit mayor Mary Sheffield, while Gilmer-Hill was endorsed by the Metro Detroit Democratic Socialists of America and Michigan's Working Families Party. Also eliminated in the primary were Deanne Austin and Fedor Kinaya, who suspended his campaign after ballots had been printed.

Bruce Langran defeated Tonya Wells in the Republican primary. The Green Party selected Stephen Boyle as their nominee for the district.

Democratic primary results
Party	Candidate	Votes	%
Democratic	Chris Gilmer-Hill	9,713	48.80
Democratic	Helena Scott (incumbent)	8,556	42.99
Democratic	Deanne Austin	1,253	6.30
Democratic	Fedor Kinaya (suspended campaign)	380	1.91
Total votes		19,902	100.0

Republican primary results
Party	Candidate	Votes	%
Republican	Bruce Langran	620	72.68
Republican	Tonya Wells	233	27.32
Total votes		853	100.0

General election results
Party	Candidate	Votes	%
Democratic	Chris Gilmer-Hill	34,333	90.97
Republican	Bruce Langran	2,871	7.61
Green	Stephen Boyle	537	1.42
Total votes		37,741	100.0
Democratic hold			

=== District 9 ===
The incumbent Democrat Joe Tate, who was re-elected with 93% of the vote in 2024, was originally retiring to run for U.S. Senate but dropped out. While eligible to seek re-election after dropping out of the Senate race, Tate announced in March 2026 that he would officially retire.

Multiple Democrats announced campaigns to succeed Tate, including Darryl Ervin, a previous legislative staffer, Arthur Harrington, a law student and previous staffer for Detroit city councilor Mary Waters, and Toni Mua, a previous state legislative candidate. Several more filed paperwork, including Anthony Eid, a former member of the state's redistricting commission. Notably, Harrington received endorsements from Tate and multiple other state legislators. Michele Lundgren, who ran for this district in 2022 and 2024, is the only Republican to have filed. Willie Burton won the primary with 23% of the vote.

The Green Party chose Jahdante John Elijah Smith and the Working Class Party chose Logan Ausherman as their nominees for this district in their respective conventions. Danetta L. Simpson has also filed paperwork to run as an independent but was disqualified.

Democratic primary results
Party	Candidate	Votes	%
Democratic	Willie Burton	3,496	23.06
Democratic	Rick Silva	3,456	22.79
Democratic	Arthur Harrington	2,714	17.90
Democratic	Patricia Hurt	1,764	11.63
Democratic	Darryl Ervin	1,024	6.75
Democratic	Toni Mua	909	6.00
Democratic	Anthony Eid	813	5.36
Democratic	Karriem Holman	595	3.92
Democratic	Bryant Hepp	391	2.58
Total votes		15,162	100.0

Republican primary results
Party	Candidate	Votes	%
Republican	Michele Lundgren	363	100
Total votes		363	100.0

General election results
Party	Candidate	Votes	%
Democratic	Willie Burton	28,815	92.12
Republican	Michele Lundgren	1,511	4.83
Working Class	Logan Ausherman	512	1.64
Green	Jahdante John Elijah Smith	440	1.41
Total votes		31,278	100.0
Democratic hold			

=== District 10 ===
The incumbent Democrat Veronica Paiz, who was re-elected with 67.44% of the vote in 2024, ran for re-election. Other candidates who filed paperwork include Democrats Andrew Cyburt and Ryan Nelson, though Paiz defeated both in the primary. Republican Peter Ochs won his primary unopposed. The Working Class Party nominated Piper Willow Smith as their nominee in this district at a convention.

Democratic primary results
Party	Candidate	Votes	%
Democratic	Veronica Paiz (incumbent)	12,049	73.60
Democratic	Ryan Nelson	2,814	17.19
Democratic	Andrew Cyburt	1,508	9.21
Total votes		16,371	100.0

Republican primary results
Party	Candidate	Votes	%
Republican	Peter Ochs	4,304	100
Total votes		4,304	100.0

General election results
Party	Candidate	Votes	%
Democratic	Veronica Paiz (incumbent)	30,901	69.21
Republican	Peter Ochs	12,868	28.82
Working Class	Piper Willow Smith	880	1.97
Total votes		44,649	100.0
Democratic hold			

=== District 11 ===
The incumbent Democrat Donavan McKinney, who was re-elected with 82.31% of the vote in 2024, retired to run for the U.S House. Macomb County commissioner Michael Howard, Kimberly Fisher, and Cranstana Brown Anderson were all seeking the Democratic nomination to succeed McKinney. Fisher later won the primary with 63% of the vote. Republican Dale Walker, who was the nominee for this district in 2024, ran again, as well as Matthew Stafford and former Warren city councilor Eddie Kabacinski. Stafford later won the primary with 54% of the vote.

Democratic primary results
Party	Candidate	Votes	%
Democratic	Kimberly Fisher	6,037	63.18
Democratic	Michael Howard	2,273	23.78
Democratic	Cranstana Brown Anderson	1,246	13.04
Total votes		9,555	100.0

Republican primary results
Party	Candidate	Votes	%
Republican	Matthew Stafford	581	54.20
Republican	Eddie Kabacinski	290	27.05
Republican	Dale Walker	201	18.75
Total votes		1,072	100.0

General election results
Party	Candidate	Votes	%
Democratic	Kimberly Fisher	23,867	86.39
Republican	Matthew Stafford	3,759	13.61
Total votes		27,626	100.0
Democratic hold			

=== District 12 ===
The incumbent Democrat Kimberly Edwards, who was re-elected with 69.67% of the vote in 2024, ran for re-election. Republicans who filed for this district include Brian Hakola and Randell Shafer, with Shafer winning the primary with 58% of the vote .

Democratic primary results
Party	Candidate	Votes	%
Democratic	Kimberly Edwards (incumbent)	11,762	100
Total votes		11,762	100.0

Republican primary results
Party	Candidate	Votes	%
Republican	Randell Shafer	2,001	57.78
Republican	Bryan Hakola	1,462	42.22
Total votes		3,463	100.0

General election results
Party	Candidate	Votes	%
Democratic	Kimberly Edwards (incumbent)	27,396	73.18
Republican	Randell Shafer	10,038	26.82
Total votes		37,434	100.0
Democratic hold			

=== District 13 ===
The incumbent Democrat Mai Xiong, who was re-elected with 50.82% of the vote in 2024, ran for re-election. School bus driver Julie Leonardi ran for the Republican nomination, as well as Mark Foster and Casey Armitage, the president of Michigan Open Carry Inc. Foster won the primary with 36% of the vote.

Democratic primary results
Party	Candidate	Votes	%
Democratic	Mai Xiong (incumbent)	11,236	100
Total votes		11,236	100.0

Republican primary results
Party	Candidate	Votes	%
Republican	Mark Foster	2,229	36.39
Republican	Julie Leonardi	2,174	35.49
Republican	Casey Armitage	1,722	28.11
Total votes		6,125	100.0

General election results
Party	Candidate	Votes	%
Democratic	Mai Xiong (incumbent)	24,431	60.02
Republican	Mark Foster	16,275	39.98
Total votes		40,706	100.0
Democratic hold			

=== District 14 ===
The incumbent Democrat Mike McFall, who was re-elected with 59.06% of the vote in 2024, ran for re-election. McFall was being challenged in the primary by Minhaj Chowdhury, with him later winning the primary with 71% of the vote. Republican Larry Szyska won his primary unopposed. Jeff Sparling was chosen as the Green Party's nominee for this district at a convention.

Democratic primary results
Party	Candidate	Votes	%
Democratic	Mike McFall (incumbent)	9,877	70.79
Democratic	Minhaj Chowdhury	4,075	29.21
Total votes		13,952	100.0

Republican primary results
Party	Candidate	Votes	%
Republican	Larry Syzska	4,314	100
Total votes		4,314	100.0

General election results
Party	Candidate	Votes	%
Democratic	Mike McFall (incumbent)	27,047	67.40
Republican	Larry Syzska	12,350	30.77
Green	Jeff Sparling	734	1.83
Total votes		40,131	100.0
Democratic hold			

=== District 15 ===
The incumbent Democrat Erin Byrnes, who was re-elected with 56.29% of the vote in 2024, retired to run for the state senate. Democratic candidates seeking to succeed Byrnes included Jalal Abdallah, Leslie Herrick, and Gary Woronchak. Abdallah won the primary with 51% of the vote. Hassan Nehme, an electrical engineer and disqualified candidate for Michigan's 12th congressional district in 2024, won the Republican nomination unopposed.

Democratic primary results
Party	Candidate	Votes	%
Democratic	Jalal Abdallah	8,380	51.33
Democratic	Gary Woronchak	4,253	26.04
Democratic	Leslie Herrick	3,694	22.63
Total votes		16,327	100.0

Republican primary results
Party	Candidate	Votes	%
Republican	Hassan Nehme	2,471	100
Total votes		2,471	100.0

General election results
Party	Candidate	Votes	%
Democratic	Jalal Abdallah	26,215	72.44
Republican	Hassan Nehme	9,972	27.56
Total votes		36,187	100.0
Democratic hold			

=== District 16 ===
The incumbent Democrat Stephanie Young, who was re-elected with 73.52% of the vote in 2024, ran for re-election. Brian Duggan filed for this district and won the Republican primary unopposed.

Democratic primary results
Party	Candidate	Votes	%
Democratic	Stephanie Young (incumbent)	16,597	100
Total votes		16,597	100.0

Republican primary results
Party	Candidate	Votes	%
Republican	Brian Duggan	3,151	100
Total votes		3,151	100.0

General election results
Party	Candidate	Votes	%
Democratic	Stephanie Young (incumbent)	33,585	80.08
Republican	Brian Duggan	8,353	19.92
Total votes		41,938	100.0
Democratic hold			

=== District 17 ===
The incumbent Democrat Laurie Pohutsky, who was re-elected with 69.75% of the vote in 2024, ran for re-election. Republican Ken Crider won the primary unopposed.

Democratic primary results
Party	Candidate	Votes	%
Democratic	Laurie Pohutsky (incumbent)	13,365	100
Total votes		13,365	100.0

Republican primary results
Party	Candidate	Votes	%
Republican	Ken Crider	4,191	100
Total votes		4,191	100.0

General election results
Party	Candidate	Votes	%
Democratic	Laurie Pohutsky (incumbent)	28,182	72.13
Republican	Ken Crider	10,887	27.87
Total votes		39,069	100.0
Democratic hold			

=== District 18 ===
The incumbent Democrat Jason Hoskins, who was re-elected with 78.93% of the vote in 2024, retired to run for the state senate. The only candidate seeking the Democratic nomination was Kelly Garrett, and the candidates seeking the Republican nomination were Ryan Foster and Ronald Ulmer-Paul, with Foster winning 72% of the vote.

Democratic primary results
Party	Candidate	Votes	%
Democratic	Kelly Garrett	19,246	100
Total votes		19,246	100.0

Republican primary results
Party	Candidate	Votes	%
Republican	Ryan Foster	1,886	71.71
Republican	Ronald Ulmer-Paul	744	28.29
Total votes		2,630	100.0

General election results
Party	Candidate	Votes	%
Democratic	Kelly Garrett	38,445	81.24
Republican	Ryan Foster	8,878	18.76
Total votes		47,323	100.0
Democratic hold			

=== District 19 ===
The incumbent Democrat Samantha Steckloff, who was re-elected with 65.28% of the vote in 2024, ran for re-election and was being challenged by Brandon Young in the primary. Steckloff won 73% of the vote in the primary. Republican candidates include Kevin Hammer and Mitch Swoboda. Hammer later won the primary with 66% of the vote.

Democratic primary results
Party	Candidate	Votes	%
Democratic	Samantha Steckloff (incumbent)	15,826	73.84
Democratic	Brandon Young	5,607	26.16
Total votes		21,433	100.0

Republican primary results
Party	Candidate	Votes	%
Republican	Kevin Hammer	3,223	65.63
Republican	Mitch Swoboda	1,688	34.37
Total votes		4,911	100.0

General election results
Party	Candidate	Votes	%
Democratic	Samantha Steckloff (incumbent)	34,875	69.41
Republican	Kevin Hammer	15,368	30.59
Total votes		50,243	100.0
Democratic hold			

=== District 20 ===
The incumbent Democrat Noah Arbit, who was re-elected with 53.23% of the vote in 2024, ran for re-election. Republican candidates include Hermon Barbe and S. David Sullivan. Sullivan won the primary with 58% of the vote.

Democratic primary results
Party	Candidate	Votes	%
Democratic	Noah Arbit (incumbent)	17,179	100
Total votes		17,179	100.0

Republican primary results
Party	Candidate	Votes	%
Republican	S. David Sullivan	3,353	57.94
Republican	Hermon Barbe	2,434	42.06
Total votes		5,787	100.0

General election results
Party	Candidate	Votes	%
Democratic	Noah Arbit (incumbent)	30,818	59.38
Republican	S. David Sullivan	21,078	40.62
Total votes		51,896	100.0
Democratic hold			

=== District 21 ===
The incumbent Democrat Kelly Breen, who was re-elected with 55.51% of the vote in 2024, ran for re-election. Ross Barranco is the only Republican who filed for this district and won the primary unopposed.

Democratic primary results
Party	Candidate	Votes	%
Democratic	Kelly Breen (incumbent)	12,790	100
Total votes		12,790	100.0

Republican primary results
Party	Candidate	Votes	%
Republican	Ross Barranco	6,463	100
Total votes		6,463	100.0

General election results
Party	Candidate	Votes	%
Democratic	Kelly Breen (incumbent)	26,378	61.05
Republican	Ross Barranco	16,827	38.95
Total votes		43,205	100.0
Democratic hold			

=== District 22 ===
The incumbent Democrat Matt Koleszar, who was re-elected with 52.50% of the vote in 2024, retired and ran for the state senate. Lisa McIntyre, the treasurer of the Northville Public Schools Board of Education, won the Democratic primary unopposed. McIntyre had been endorsed by Ranjeev Puri, minority leader of the state House, and the Michigan Education Association. Republican Casey Noce won his primary unopposed.

Democratic primary results
Party	Candidate	Votes	%
Democratic	Lisa McIntyre	18,046	100
Total votes		18,046	100.0

Republican primary results
Party	Candidate	Votes	%
Republican	Casey Noce	9,929	100
Total votes		9,929	100.0

General election results
Party	Candidate	Votes	%
Democratic	Lisa McIntyre	30,245	55.79
Republican	Casey Noce	23,966	44.21
Total votes		54,211	100.0
Democratic hold			

=== District 23 ===
The incumbent Democrat Jason Morgan, who was re-elected 61.51% of the vote in 2024, ran for re-election. Challenging Morgan is Republican Miriam Corvino, who won her primary unopposed. Christina Marudas was selected as the Green Party nominee for this district at a convention.

Democratic primary results
Party	Candidate	Votes	%
Democratic	Jason Morgan (incumbent)	11,938	100
Total votes		11,938	100.0

Republican primary results
Party	Candidate	Votes	%
Republican	Miriam Corvino	4,503	100
Total votes		4,503	100.0

General election results
Party	Candidate	Votes	%
Democratic	Jason Morgan (incumbent)	28,373	66.67
Republican	Miriam Corvino	13,673	32.12
Green	Christina Marudas	516	1.21
Total votes		42,562	100.0
Democratic hold			

=== District 24 ===
The incumbent Democrat Ranjeev Puri, who was re-elected 59.82% of the vote in 2024, ran for re-election. Republican Allison Fuller has also filed to run for this district and won the primary unopposed.

Democratic primary results
Party	Candidate	Votes	%
Democratic	Ranjeev Puri (incumbent)	16,599	100
Total votes		16,599	100.0

Republican primary results
Party	Candidate	Votes	%
Republican	Allison Fuller	5,735	100
Total votes		5,735	100.0

General election results
Party	Candidate	Votes	%
Democratic	Ranjeev Puri (incumbent)	31,043	66.19
Republican	Allison Fuller	15,859	33.81
Total votes		46,902	100.0
Democratic hold			

=== District 25 ===
The incumbent Democrat Peter Herzberg, who was re-elected with 58.93% of the vote in 2024, ran for re-election. Republican Dawn Udell has also filed to run for this district and won the primary unopposed.

Democratic primary results
Party	Candidate	Votes	%
Democratic	Peter Herzberg (incumbent)	11,405	100
Total votes		11,405	100.0

Republican primary results
Party	Candidate	Votes	%
Republican	Dawn Udell	4,407	100
Total votes		4,407	100.0

General election results
Party	Candidate	Votes	%
Democratic	Peter Herzberg (incumbent)	24,635	66.39
Republican	Dawn Udell	12,473	33.61
Total votes		37,108	100.0
Democratic hold			

=== District 26 ===
The incumbent Democrat Dylan Wegela, who was re-elected 65.72% of the vote in 2024, ran for re-election. Republican Chris Dobis has also filed to run for this district and won the primary unopposed.

Democratic primary results
Party	Candidate	Votes	%
Democratic	Dylan Wegela (incumbent)	10,715	100
Total votes		10,715	100.0

Republican primary results
Party	Candidate	Votes	%
Republican	Chris Dobis	3,123	100
Total votes		3,123	100.0

General election results
Party	Candidate	Votes	%
Democratic	Dylan Wegela (incumbent)	24,265	70.96
Republican	Chris Dobis	9,928	29.04
Total votes		34,193	100.0
Democratic hold			

=== District 27 ===
The incumbent Republican Rylee Linting, who was elected with 52.16% of the vote in 2024, ran for re-election. The Democratic nominee in this district is Jaime Churches, a former representative of this district who was first elected in 2022 and lost to Linting in 2024.

Republican primary results
Party	Candidate	Votes	%
Republican	Rylee Linting (incumbent)	8,475	100
Total votes		8,475	100.0

Democratic primary results
Party	Candidate	Votes	%
Democratic	Jaime Churches	13,321	100
Total votes		13,321	100.0

General election results
Party	Candidate	Votes	%
Democratic	Jaime Churches	23,122	51.85
Republican	Rylee Linting (incumbent)	21,472	48.15
Total votes		44,594	100.0
Democratic gain from Republican			

=== District 28 ===
The incumbent Republican Jamie Thompson, who was re-elected with 54.36% of the vote in 2024, ran for re-election. Democrat Sherry Berecz filed paperwork to run in this district and won the primary unopposed.

Republican primary results
Party	Candidate	Votes	%
Republican	Jamie Thompson (incumbent)	6,930	100
Total votes		6,930	100.0

Democratic primary results
Party	Candidate	Votes	%
Democratic	Sherry Berecz	10,223	100
Total votes		10,223	100.0

General election results
Party	Candidate	Votes	%
Democratic	Sherry Berecz	20,937	50.88
Republican	Jamie Thompson (incumbent)	20,211	49.12
Total votes		41,148	100.0
Democratic gain from Republican			

=== District 29 ===
The incumbent Republican James DeSana, who was re-elected with 55.03% of the vote in 2024, ran for re-election. Democrats Darian Counts and Rich Li have also filed paperwork to run for this district. Counts later won the primary with 56% of the vote.

Republican primary results
Party	Candidate	Votes	%
Republican	James DeSana (incumbent)	6,623	100
Total votes		6,623	100.0

Democratic primary results
Party	Candidate	Votes	%
Democratic	Darian Counts	4,729	55.52
Democratic	Rich Li	3,789	44.48
Total votes		8,518	100.0

General election results
Party	Candidate	Votes	%
Republican	James DeSana (incumbent)	19,467	51.47
Democratic	Darian Counts	18,358	48.53
Total votes		37,825	100.0
Republican hold			

=== District 30 ===
The incumbent Republican William Bruck, who was re-elected with 64.54% of the vote in 2024, ran for re-election. The only Democrat who filed for this district is Omar Ferdin, with him winning the primary unopposed.

Republican primary results
Party	Candidate	Votes	%
Republican	William Bruck (incumbent)	8,645	100
Total votes		8,645	100.0

Democratic primary results
Party	Candidate	Votes	%
Democratic	Omar Ferdin	7,842	100
Total votes		7,842	100.0

General election results
Party	Candidate	Votes	%
Republican	William Bruck (incumbent)	25,745	60.52
Democratic	Omar Ferdin	16,794	39.48
Total votes		42,539	100.0
Republican hold			

=== District 31 ===
The incumbent Democrat Reggie Miller, who was re-elected with 50.64% of the vote in 2024, retired. Shannon Dare Wayne, a Milan city councilor, was endorsed by Miller and ran to succeed her. Businesswoman Laura Perry was seeking the Republican nomination. Both won their primaries unopposed.

Democratic primary results
Party	Candidate	Votes	%
Democratic	Shannon Dare Wayne	12,572	100
Total votes		12,572	100.0

Republican primary results
Party	Candidate	Votes	%
Republican	Laura Perry	7,720	100
Total votes		7,720	100.0

General election results
Party	Candidate	Votes	%
Democratic	Shannon Dare Wayne	24,612	53.48
Republican	Laura Perry	21,408	46.52
Total votes		46,020	100.0
Democratic hold			

=== District 32 ===
The incumbent Democrat Jimmie Wilson Jr., who was re-elected with 75.08% of the vote in 2024, ran for re-election. William Riney challenged Wilson in the Democratic primary, and Martin Church and Mike Eller ran for the Republican nomination. Wilson and Eller won their respective primaries. The U.S. Taxpayers Party, known nationally as the Constitution Party, selected John R. Tatar as their candidate for this race, and the Green Party selected Ryan Sample as theirs.

Democratic primary results
Party	Candidate	Votes	%
Democratic	Jimmie Wilson Jr. (incumbent)	14,799	79.30
Democratic	William Riney	3,863	20.70
Total votes		18,662	100.0

Republican primary results
Party	Candidate	Votes	%
Republican	Mike Eller	1,361	58.04
Republican	Martin Church	984	41.96
Total votes		2,345	100.0

General election results
Party	Candidate	Votes	%
Democratic	Jimmie Wilson Jr. (incumbent)	32,899	80.77
Republican	Mike Eller	7,030	17.26
Green	Ryan Sample	480	1.18
U.S. Taxpayers	John R. Tatar	321	0.79
Total votes		40,730	100.0
Democratic hold			

=== District 33 ===
The incumbent Democrat Morgan Foreman, who was elected with 74.22% of the vote in 2024, ran for re-election. Catherine Rogers was the only Republican who filed for this district. Both won their primaries unopposed.

Democratic primary results
Party	Candidate	Votes	%
Democratic	Morgan Foreman (incumbent)	21,594	100
Total votes		21,594	100.0

Republican primary results
Party	Candidate	Votes	%
Republican	Catherine Rogers	3,622	100
Total votes		3,622	100.0

General election results
Party	Candidate	Votes	%
Democratic	Morgan Foreman (incumbent)	40,477	78.63
Republican	Catherine Rogers	11,003	21.37
Total votes		51,480	100.0
Democratic hold			

=== District 34 ===
The incumbent Republican Nancy Jenkins-Arno, who was elected with 64.07% of the vote in 2024, ran for re-election. Both Democrats who filed for this district were either disqualified or withdrew. One of the candidates, 2024 nominee John E. Dahlgren, decided to run a write-in campaign and got enough votes to win the nomination and move on to the general election. Jenkins-Arno won her primary unopposed. This is a rematch of the 2024 election.

Republican primary results
Party	Candidate	Votes	%
Republican	Nancy Jenkins-Arno (incumbent)	8,236	100
Total votes		8,236	100.0

Democratic primary results
Party	Candidate	Votes	%
Democratic	John E. Dahlgren (write-in)	482	100
Total votes		482	100.0

General election results
Party	Candidate	Votes	%
Republican	Nancy Jenkins-Arno (incumbent)	23,444	58.07
Democratic	John E. Dahlgren	16,927	41.93
Total votes		40,371	100.0
Republican hold			

=== District 35 ===
The incumbent Republican Jennifer Wortz, who was elected 74.07% of the vote in 2024, ran for re-election. Democrat Jeff Cooley filed to run for this district as well. Both won their primaries unopposed.

Republican primary results
Party	Candidate	Votes	%
Republican	Jennifer Wortz (incumbent)	9,403	100
Total votes		9,403	100.0

Democratic primary results
Party	Candidate	Votes	%
Democratic	Jeff Cooley	5,029	100
Total votes		5,029	100.0

General election results
Party	Candidate	Votes	%
Republican	Jennifer Wortz (incumbent)	25,610	70.89
Democratic	Jeff Cooley	10,515	29.11
Total votes		36,125	100.0
Republican hold			

=== District 36 ===
The incumbent Republican Steve Carra, who was re-elected with 68.35% of the vote in 2024, ran for re-election. Constantine Township trustee Max Coon and Luke Lori challenged Carra in the Republican primary, and Democrat Cole Slaski filed for this district as well. Carra won his primary with 58% of the vote, and Slaski won unopposed.

Republican primary results
Party	Candidate	Votes	%
Republican	Steve Carra (incumbent)	5,945	58.47
Republican	Luke Lori	3,579	35.20
Republican	Max Coon	643	6.33
Total votes		10,167	100.0

Democratic primary results
Party	Candidate	Votes	%
Democratic	Cole Slaski	5,859	100
Total votes		5,859	100.0

General election results
Party	Candidate	Votes	%
Republican	Steve Carra (incumbent)	22,161	63.08
Democratic	Cole Slaski	12,872	36.64
Write-in		100	0.28
Total votes		35,133	100.0
Republican hold			

=== District 37 ===
The incumbent Republican Brad Paquette, who was re-elected with 64.89% of the vote in 2024, ran for re-election. Republican Steve Bury challenged Paquette in the primary, with Paquette winning it with 89% of the vote. Democrat Angela Jones filed for this district and won the primary unopposed.

Republican primary results
Party	Candidate	Votes	%
Republican	Brad Paquette (incumbent)	8,021	88.81
Republican	Steve Bury	1,011	11.19
Total votes		9,032	100.0

Democratic primary results
Party	Candidate	Votes	%
Democratic	Angela Jones	7,036	100
Total votes		7,036	100.0

General election results
Party	Candidate	Votes	%
Republican	Brad Paquette (incumbent)	21,908	58.82
Democratic	Angela Jones	15,338	41.18
Total votes		37,246	100.0
Republican hold			

=== District 38 ===
The incumbent Democrat Joey Andrews, who was re-elected with 53.15% of the vote in 2024, ran unopposed in the primary. Mark Krieger also ran unopposed for the Republican nomination, and the Green Party nominated Jett Newton as their candidate.

Democratic primary results
Party	Candidate	Votes	%
Democratic	Joey Andrews (incumbent)	13,819	100
Total votes		13,819	100.0

Republican primary results
Party	Candidate	Votes	%
Republican	Mark Krieger	8,617	100
Total votes		8,617	100.0

General election results
Party	Candidate	Votes	%
Democratic	Joey Andrews (incumbent)	25,955	56.75
Republican	Mark Krieger	19,212	42.01
Green	Jett Newton	569	1.24
Total votes		45,736	100.0
Democratic hold			

=== District 39 ===
The incumbent Republican Pauline Wendzel, who was re-elected with 63.09% of the vote in 2024, ran for re-election. Wendzel was being challenged by Bill Sage in the Republican primary. Democrats Kerry Tapper, who was the 2024 nominee for this district, and Zachary Shinabargar also filed to run in this district. Wendzel and Tapper won their respective primaries and faced each other in the general election.

Republican primary results
Party	Candidate	Votes	%
Republican	Pauline Wendzel (incumbent)	6,970	70.80
Republican	Bill Sage	2,875	29.20
Total votes		9,845	100.0

Democratic primary results
Party	Candidate	Votes	%
Democratic	Kerry Tapper	5,869	68.60
Democratic	Zachary Shinabargar	2,686	31.40
Total votes		8,555	100.0

General election results
Party	Candidate	Votes	%
Republican	Pauline Wendzel (incumbent)	22,390	57.02
Democratic	Kerry Tapper	16,225	41.31
Green	Jared Polonowski	655	1.67
Total votes		39,270	100.0
Republican hold			

=== District 40 ===
The incumbent Democrat Matt Longjohn, who was elected with 57.4% of the vote in 2024, ran for re-election. Republican Robert Sitarski filed to run for this district as well. Both won their primaries unopposed.

Democratic primary results
Party	Candidate	Votes	%
Democratic	Matt Longjohn (incumbent)	16,737	100
Total votes		16,737	100.0

Republican primary results
Party	Candidate	Votes	%
Republican	Robert Sitarski	7,000	100
Total votes		7,000	100.0

General election results
Party	Candidate	Votes	%
Democratic	Matt Longjohn (incumbent)	30,745	64.22
Republican	Robert Sitarski	17,128	35.78
Total votes		47,873	100.0
Democratic hold			

=== District 41 ===
The incumbent Democrat Julie Rogers, who was re-elected with 75.64% of the vote in 2024, retired to run for the state senate. Democrats seeking to succeed Rogers included Jen Strebs, the chairwoman of the Kalamazoo County Commission, and Jessica Swarts, an attorney who previously ran for Michigan's 4th congressional district in 2024. Strebs defeated Swartz with 56% of the vote. The only Republican who filed paperwork for this district was Nicole Sabel. The Libertarian Party nominated Rafael Wolf at convention.

Democratic primary results
Party	Candidate	Votes	%
Democratic	Jen Strebs	8,220	55.60
Democratic	Jessica Swartz	6,563	44.40
Total votes		14,783	100.0

Republican primary results
Party	Candidate	Votes	%
Republican	Nicole Sabel	2,116	100
Total votes		2,116	100.0

General election results
Party	Candidate	Votes	%
Democratic	Jen Strebs	27,728	80.59
Republican	Nicole Sabel	5,973	17.36
Libertarian	Rafael Wolf	703	2.04
Write-in		1	0.00
Total votes		34,405	100.0
Democratic hold			

=== District 42 ===
The incumbent Republican Matt Hall, who was re-elected with 57.46% of the vote in 2024, ran for re-election. Democrats running for this seat included Nick Rowe, an Air Force veteran, and Bill Korb, a U.S. Army veteran. Rowe defeated Korb with 59% of the vote, while Hall won his primary unopposed.

Republican primary results
Party	Candidate	Votes	%
Republican	Matt Hall (incumbent)	9,443	100
Total votes		9,443	100.0

Democratic primary results
Party	Candidate	Votes	%
Democratic	Nick Rowe	7,092	58.75
Democratic	Bill Korb	4,979	41.25
Total votes		12,071	100.0

General election results
Party	Candidate	Votes	%
Republican	Matt Hall (incumbent)	23,908	51.60
Democratic	Nick Rowe	22,424	48.40
Total votes		46,332	100.0
Republican hold			

=== District 43 ===
The incumbent Republican Rachelle Smit, who was elected with 72.07% of the vote in 2024, ran for re-election. The only Democrat who filed for this district was Alan Swank. Both won their primaries unopposed.

Republican primary results
Party	Candidate	Votes	%
Republican	Rachelle Smit (incumbent)	13,487	100
Total votes		13,487	100.0

Democratic primary results
Party	Candidate	Votes	%
Democratic	Alan Swank	7,493	100
Total votes		7,493	100.0

General election results
Party	Candidate	Votes	%
Republican	Rachelle Smit (incumbent)	31,847	68.71
Democratic	Alan Swank	14,502	31.29
Total votes		46,349	100.0
Republican hold			

=== District 44 ===
The incumbent Republican Steve Frisbie, who was elected with 50.07% of the vote in 2024, ran for re-election. The only Democrat who ran was Jim Haadsma, a former state representative for this district from 2019 to 2025. This was a rematch of the 2024 election.

Republican primary results
Party	Candidate	Votes	%
Republican	Steve Frisbie (incumbent)	5,382	100
Total votes		5,382	100.0

Democratic primary results
Party	Candidate	Votes	%
Democratic	Jim Haadsma	8,156	100
Total votes		8,156	100.0

General election results
Party	Candidate	Votes	%
Democratic	Jim Haadsma	17,939	53.43
Republican	Steve Frisbie (incumbent)	15,634	46.57
Total votes		33,573	100.0
Democratic gain from Republican			

=== District 45 ===
The incumbent Republican Sarah Lightner, who was re-elected with 69.59% of the vote in 2024, ran for re-election. The only Democrat who filed for this district was Randy Davis. Both won their primaries unopposed.

Republican primary results
Party	Candidate	Votes	%
Republican	Sarah Lightner (incumbent)	10,560	100
Total votes		10,560	100.0

Democratic primary results
Party	Candidate	Votes	%
Democratic	Randy Davis	7,617	100
Total votes		7,617	100.0

General election results
Party	Candidate	Votes	%
Republican	Sarah Lightner (incumbent)	27,590	65.73
Democratic	Randy Davis	14,387	34.27
Total votes		41,977	100.0
Republican hold			

=== District 46 ===
The incumbent Republican Kathy Schmaltz, who was re-elected with 52.07% of the vote in 2024, ran for re-election. The only Democrat who ran for this district was Jan Maino, a therapist and president of the East Jackson School Board.

Republican primary results
Party	Candidate	Votes	%
Republican	Kathy Schmaltz (incumbent)	6,236	100
Total votes		6,236	100.0

Democratic primary results
Party	Candidate	Votes	%
Democratic	Jan Maino	9,438	100
Total votes		9,438	100.0

General election results
Party	Candidate	Votes	%
Democratic	Jan Maino	18,645	54.11
Republican	Kathy Schmaltz (incumbent)	15,813	45.89
Total votes		34,458	100.0
Democratic gain from Republican			

=== District 47 ===
The incumbent Democrat Carrie Rheingans, who was re-elected with 60.13% of the vote in 2024, ran for re-election. The only Republican running for this district was Justin Griffis.

Democratic primary results
Party	Candidate	Votes	%
Democratic	Carrie Rheingans (incumbent)	20,014	100
Total votes		20,014	100.0

Republican primary results
Party	Candidate	Votes	%
Republican	Justin Griffis	6,525	100
Total votes		6,525	100.0

General election results
Party	Candidate	Votes	%
Democratic	Carrie Rheingans (incumbent)	34,961	65.81
Republican	Justin Griffis	18,160	34.19
Total votes		53,121	100.0
Democratic hold			

=== District 48 ===
The incumbent Democrat Jennifer Conlin, who was re-elected with 51.50% of the vote in 2024, ran for re-election. The only Republican running for this district was Brian Ignatowski, the nominee for this district in 2024. This was a rematch of the 2024 election.

Democratic primary results
Party	Candidate	Votes	%
Democratic	Jennifer Conlin (incumbent)	17,051	100
Total votes		17,051	100.0

Republican primary results
Party	Candidate	Votes	%
Republican	Brian Ignatowski	9,464	100
Total votes		9,464	100.0

General election results
Party	Candidate	Votes	%
Democratic	Jennifer Conlin (incumbent)	29,797	55.43
Republican	Brian Ignatowski	23,957	44.57
Total votes		53,754	100.0
Democratic hold			

=== District 49 ===
The incumbent Republican Ann Bollin, who was re-elected with 58.86% of the vote in 2024, ran for re-election. The only Democrat running for this district was Dan Pelchat, who previously served as the mayor of South Lyon. The Libertarian Party nominated Trevor Step at convention.

Republican primary results
Party	Candidate	Votes	%
Republican	Ann Bollin (incumbent)	9,325	100
Total votes		9,325	100.0

Democratic primary results
Party	Candidate	Votes	%
Democratic	Dan Pelchat	10,777	100
Total votes		10,777	100.0

General election results
Party	Candidate	Votes	%
Republican	Ann Bollin (incumbent)	25,529	52.98
Democratic	Dan Pelchat	21,952	45.56
Libertarian	Trevor Step	702	1.46
Total votes		48,183	100.0
Republican hold			

=== District 50 ===
The incumbent Republican Jason Woolford, who was elected with 67.64% of the vote in 2024, ran for re-election. The only Democrat who filed for this district was Cassie Canedo. Both won their primaries unopposed.

Republican primary results
Party	Candidate	Votes	%
Republican	Jason Woolford (incumbent)	12,578	100
Total votes		12,578	100.0

Democratic primary results
Party	Candidate	Votes	%
Democratic	Cassie Canedo	9,376	100
Total votes		9,376	100.0

General election results
Party	Candidate	Votes	%
Republican	Jason Woolford (incumbent)	32,456	64.26
Democratic	Cassie Canedo	18,049	35.74
Total votes		50,505	100.0
Republican hold			

=== District 51 ===
The incumbent Republican Matt Maddock, who was re-elected with 59.52% of the vote in 2024, ran for re-election. Democrats who filed for this district included Stacey McDuffie and Gary Murrell. McDuffie won the primary with 65% of the vote.

Republican primary results
Party	Candidate	Votes	%
Republican	Matt Maddock (incumbent)	11,866	100
Total votes		11,866	100.0

Democratic primary results
Party	Candidate	Votes	%
Democratic	Stacey McDuffie	7,974	65.19
Democratic	Gary Murrell	4,257	34.81
Total votes		12,231	100.0

General election results
Party	Candidate	Votes	%
Republican	Matt Maddock (incumbent)	28,326	55.87
Democratic	Stacey McDuffie	22,376	44.13
Total votes		50,702	100.0
Republican hold			

=== District 52 ===
The incumbent Republican Mike Harris, who was re-elected with 62.03% of the vote in 2024, ran for re-election. Democrats who filed for this district included Brendan Leddy and Tom Owensby. Leddy won the primary with 55% of the vote.

Republican primary results
Party	Candidate	Votes	%
Republican	Mike Harris (incumbent)	11,471	100
Total votes		11,471	100.0

Democratic primary results
Party	Candidate	Votes	%
Democratic	Brendan Leddy	6,136	55.15
Democratic	Tom Owensby	4,991	44.85
Total votes		11,127	100.0

General election results
Party	Candidate	Votes	%
Republican	Mike Harris (incumbent)	27,672	56.99
Democratic	Brendan Leddy	20,884	43.01
Total votes		48,556	100.0
Republican hold			

=== District 53 ===
The incumbent Democrat Brenda Carter, who was re-elected with 65.85% of the vote in 2024, ran for re-election. Carter was being challenged by Democrat Robert Anderlie in the primary, with her winning 93% of the vote. Melissa Schultz, the 2024 Republican nominee for this district, is running again. This is a rematch of the 2024 election.

Democratic primary results
Party	Candidate	Votes	%
Democratic	Brenda Carter (incumbent)	10,133	93.01
Democratic	Robert Anderlie	762	6.99
Total votes		10,895	100.0

Republican primary results
Party	Candidate	Votes	%
Republican	Melissa Schultz	3,307	100
Total votes		3,307	100.0

General election results
Party	Candidate	Votes	%
Democratic	Brenda Carter (incumbent)	23,243	71.52
Republican	Melissa Schultz	9,255	28.48
Total votes		32,498	100.0
Democratic hold			

=== District 54 ===
The incumbent Republican Donni Steele, who was re-elected with 52.41% of the vote in 2024, retired to run for the state senate. Republicans Roman Gaskey and Jeffrey Omtvedt filed to succeed Steele. The only Democrat who filed for this district was Sarah Pounds. Gaskey narrowly won his primary with 50% of the vote, while Pounds was unopposed.

Republican primary results
Party	Candidate	Votes	%
Republican	Roman Gaskey	4,850	50.31
Republican	Jeffrey Omtvedt	4,790	49.69
Total votes		9,640	100.0

Democratic primary results
Party	Candidate	Votes	%
Democratic	Sarah Pounds	12,285	100
Total votes		12,285	100.0

General election results
Party	Candidate	Votes	%
Democratic	Sarah Pounds	25,881	52.92
Republican	Roman Gaskey	23,023	47.08
Total votes		48,904	100.0
Democratic gain from Republican			

=== District 55 ===
The incumbent Republican Mark Tisdel, who was re-elected with 53.73% of the vote in 2024, ran for re-election. The only Democrat running for this district was Alex Hawkins, a bomb disposal officer in the Michigan Army National Guard.

Republican primary results
Party	Candidate	Votes	%
Republican	Mark Tisdel (incumbent)	9,426	100
Total votes		9,426	100.0

Democratic primary results
Party	Candidate	Votes	%
Democratic	Alex Hawkins	12,619	100
Total votes		12,619	100.0

General election results
Party	Candidate	Votes	%
Democratic	Alex Hawkins	24,902	51.83
Republican	Mark Tisdel (incumbent)	23,139	48.17
Total votes		48,041	100.0
Democratic gain from Republican			

=== District 56 ===
The incumbent Democrat Sharon MacDonell, who was re-elected with 57.19% of the vote in 2024, ran for re-election. The only Republican running for this district was Ashok Baddi.

Democratic primary results
Party	Candidate	Votes	%
Democratic	Sharon MacDonell (incumbent)	14,315	100
Total votes		14,315	100.0

Republican primary results
Party	Candidate	Votes	%
Republican	Ashok Baddi	5,562	100
Total votes		5,562	100.0

General election results
Party	Candidate	Votes	%
Democratic	Sharon MacDonell (incumbent)	28,661	62.98
Republican	Ashok Baddi	16,847	37.02
Total votes		45,468	100.0
Democratic hold			

=== District 57 ===
The incumbent Republican Thomas Kuhn, who was re-elected with 57.24% of the vote in 2024, ran for re-election. The only Democrat running for this district was attorney Tom Turner.

Republican primary results
Party	Candidate	Votes	%
Republican	Thomas Kuhn (incumbent)	5,408	100
Total votes		5,408	100.0

Democratic primary results
Party	Candidate	Votes	%
Democratic	Tom Turner	8,914	100
Total votes		8,914	100.0

General election results
Party	Candidate	Votes	%
Democratic	Tom Turner	19,870	50.39
Republican	Thomas Kuhn (incumbent)	19,566	49.61
Total votes		39,436	100.0
Democratic gain from Republican			

=== District 58 ===
The incumbent Republican Ron Robinson, who was elected with 53.19% of the vote in 2024, ran for re-election. The only Democrat running for this district was Katrina Manetta.

Republican primary results
Party	Candidate	Votes	%
Republican	Ron Robinson (incumbent)	6,066	100
Total votes		6,066	100.0

Democratic primary results
Party	Candidate	Votes	%
Democratic	Katrina Manetta	9,676	100
Total votes		9,676	100.0

General election results
Party	Candidate	Votes	%
Democratic	Katrina Manetta	21,070	52.65
Republican	Ron Robinson (incumbent)	18,952	47.35
Total votes		40,022	100.0
Democratic gain from Republican			

=== District 59 ===
The incumbent Republican Doug Wozniak, who was re-elected with 68.58% of the vote in 2024, retired the run for the state senate. Multiple Republicans ran to succeed Wozniak, including Macomb County commissioner Sylvia Grot, Matt Grubb, and accountant Jean Zott. Grot won the primary with 49% of the vote. The only Democrat running for this district was Jason Robbins.

Republican primary results
Party	Candidate	Votes	%
Republican	Sylvia Grot	5,513	48.72
Republican	Jean Zott	3,677	32.50
Republican	Matt Grubb	2,125	18.78
Total votes		11,315	100.0

Democratic primary results
Party	Candidate	Votes	%
Democratic	Jason Robbins	8,692	100
Total votes		8,692	100.0

General election results
Party	Candidate	Votes	%
Republican	Sylvia Grot	28,532	61.41
Democratic	Jason Robbins	17,932	38.59
Total votes		46,464	100.0
Republican hold			

=== District 60 ===
The incumbent Republican Joseph Aragona, who was re-elected with 62.17% of the vote in 2024, ran for re-election. The only Democrat running for this district was Amy Gray.

Republican primary results
Party	Candidate	Votes	%
Republican	Joseph Aragona (incumbent)	8,840	100
Total votes		8,840	100.0

Democratic primary results
Party	Candidate	Votes	%
Democratic	Amy Gray	10,160	100
Total votes		10,160	100.0

General election results
Party	Candidate	Votes	%
Republican	Joseph Aragona (incumbent)	25,438	54.78
Democratic	Amy Gray	21,001	45.22
Total votes		46,439	100.0
Republican hold			

=== District 61 ===
The incumbent Democrat Denise Mentzer, who was re-elected with 50.72% of the vote in 2024, ran for re-election. Mentzer was being challenged by Mahbube Khan in the primary, defeating him with 84% of the vote. Republicans running for this district included Chippewa Valley Schools trustee Robert Wojtowicz and businessman John Grossenbacher, both of whom ran for this district in 2024. Wojtowicz won the primary with 72% of the vote, making the general election a rematch of 2024.

Democratic primary results
Party	Candidate	Votes	%
Democratic	Denise Mentzer (incumbent)	9,912	84.21
Democratic	Mahbube Khan	1,858	15.79
Total votes		11,770	100.0

Republican primary results
Party	Candidate	Votes	%
Republican	Robert Wojtowicz	4,935	72.39
Republican	John Grossenbacher	1,882	27.61
Total votes		6,817	100.0

General election results
Party	Candidate	Votes	%
Democratic	Denise Mentzer (incumbent)	23,397	56.03
Republican	Robert Wojtowicz	18,361	43.97
Total votes		41,758	100.0
Democratic hold			

=== District 62 ===
The incumbent Republican Alicia St. Germaine, who was re-elected with 55.99% of the vote in 2024, ran for re-election. Democrats who filed for this district included Phil Anosike, Craig Plesco, and Matthew Smith. Smith won the primary with 61% of the vote.

Republican primary results
Party	Candidate	Votes	%
Republican	Alicia St. Germaine (incumbent)	8,273	100
Total votes		8,273	100.0

Democratic primary results
Party	Candidate	Votes	%
Democratic	Matthew Smith	5,865	61.23
Democratic	Craig Plesco	2,128	22.22
Democratic	Phil Anosike	1,585	16.55
Total votes		9,578	100.0

General election results
Party	Candidate	Votes	%
Republican	Alicia St. Germaine (incumbent)	21,563	50.91
Democratic	Matthew Smith	20,795	49.09
Total votes		42,358	100.0
Republican hold			

=== District 63 ===
The incumbent Republican Jay DeBoyer, who was re-elected with 67.70% of the vote in 2024, retired to run for lieutenant governor. DeBoyer was chosen by John James as his running mate in the 2026 Michigan gubernatorial election. DeBoyer was not officially chosen until after the primaries took place, leaving the district's Republican committee members to decide who would be the nominee in the general election. Former state representative Pamela Hornberger was chosen, winning six of ten votes. Democrats who filed for this district included Robert Kelly-McFarland, the 2024 nominee for this district, and Jamie Sonneberger. Sonneberger won the primary with 65% of the vote.

Republican primary results
Party	Candidate	Votes	%
Republican	Jay DeBoyer (incumbent)	12,180	100
Total votes		12,180	100.0

Democratic primary results
Party	Candidate	Votes	%
Democratic	Jamie Sonneberger	5,817	64.52
Democratic	Robert Kelly-McFarland	3,199	35.48
Total votes		9,016	100.0

General election results
Party	Candidate	Votes	%
Republican	Pamela Hornberger	28,889	62.82
Democratic	Jamie Sonneberger	17,097	37.18
Total votes		45,978	100.0
Republican hold			

=== District 64 ===
The incumbent Republican Joseph G. Pavlov, who was elected with 61.04% of the vote in 2024, ran for re-election. The only Democrat who filed for this district was Ken Heuvelman.

Republican primary results
Party	Candidate	Votes	%
Republican	Joseph G. Pavlov (incumbent)	9,913	100
Total votes		9,913	100.0

Democratic primary results
Party	Candidate	Votes	%
Democratic	Ken Heuvelman	8,944	100
Total votes		8,944	100.0

General election results
Party	Candidate	Votes	%
Republican	Joseph G. Pavlov (incumbent)	24,858	59.60
Democratic	Ken Heuvelman	16,853	40.40
Total votes		41,711	100.0
Republican hold			

=== District 65 ===
The incumbent Republican Jaime Greene, who was re-elected with 74.27% of the vote in 2024, ran for re-election. Democrats who filed for this district included James Andonoff and James O'Brien. O'Brien won the primary with 59% of the vote.

Republican primary results
Party	Candidate	Votes	%
Republican	Jaime Greene (incumbent)	12,639	100
Total votes		12,639	100.0

Democratic primary results
Party	Candidate	Votes	%
Democratic	James O'Brien	3,831	58.56
Democratic	James Andonoff	2,711	41.44
Total votes		6,542	100.0

General election results
Party	Candidate	Votes	%
Republican	Jaime Greene (incumbent)	32,526	70.82
Democratic	James O'Brien	13,402	29.18
Total votes		45,928	100.0
Republican hold			

=== District 66 ===
The incumbent Republican Josh Schriver, who was re-elected with 68.04% of the vote in 2024, ran for re-election. The only Democrat who ran for this district was Ned Zimmer.

Republican primary results
Party	Candidate	Votes	%
Republican	Josh Schriver (incumbent)	12,973	100
Total votes		12,973	100.0

Democratic primary results
Party	Candidate	Votes	%
Democratic	Ned Zimmer	9,415	100
Total votes		9,415	100.0

General election results
Party	Candidate	Votes	%
Republican	Josh Schriver (incumbent)	32,014	62.89
Democratic	Ned Zimmer	18,892	37.11
Total votes		50,906	100.0
Republican hold			

=== District 67 ===
The incumbent Republican Phil Green, who was re-elected with 63.83% of the vote in 2024, ran for re-election. Republican Sherri Cross filed for this district as well, challenging Green, while Leslie Getz was the only Democrat to have filed. Green won the Republican primary with 82% of the vote.

Republican primary results
Party	Candidate	Votes	%
Republican	Phil Green (incumbent)	8,990	82.21
Republican	Sherri Cross	1,946	17.79
Total votes		10,936	100.0

Democratic primary results
Party	Candidate	Votes	%
Democratic	Leslie Getz	9,584	100
Total votes		9,584	100.0

General election results
Party	Candidate	Votes	%
Republican	Phil Green (incumbent)	25,496	58.61
Democratic	Leslie Getz	18,006	41.39
Total votes		43,502	100.0
Republican hold			

=== District 68 ===
The incumbent Republican David Martin, who was re-elected with 54.49% of the vote in 2024, ran for re-election. Democrats who filed for this district included Isaiah Grays, a former congressional intern, and Matt Schlinker, the 2024 nominee for this district. Schlinker went on to with the Democratic primary with 67% of the vote. The Libertarian Party nominated Deanna L Martin at a convention. Joe McHugh has also filed to run for this district as an independent. The general election was a rematch of 2024.

Republican primary results
Party	Candidate	Votes	%
Republican	David Martin (incumbent)	8,049	100
Total votes		8,049	100.0

Democratic primary results
Party	Candidate	Votes	%
Democratic	Matt Schlinker	8,648	67.40
Democratic	Isaiah Grays	4,182	32.60
Total votes		12,830	100.0

General election results
Party	Candidate	Votes	%
Democratic	Matt Schlinker	22,833	50.17
Republican	David Martin (incumbent)	21,554	47.36
Libertarian	Deanna L. Martin	698	1.53
Independent	Joe McHugh	429	0.94
Total votes		45,514	100.0
Democratic gain from Republican			

=== District 69 ===
The incumbent Democrat Jasper Martus, who was re-elected with 56.25% of the vote in 2024, ran for re-election. The only Republican who filed for this district was Patrick Duvendeck. The Libertarian Party nominated Adam Blake Childress at a convention.

Democratic primary results
Party	Candidate	Votes	%
Democratic	Jasper Martus (incumbent)	12,896	100
Total votes		12,896	100.0

Republican primary results
Party	Candidate	Votes	%
Republican	Patrick Duvendeck	5,248	100
Total votes		5,248	100.0

General election results
Party	Candidate	Votes	%
Democratic	Jasper Martus (incumbent)	24,019	60.18
Republican	Patrick Duvendeck	15,103	37.84
Libertarian	Adam Blake Childress	790	1.98
Total votes		39,912	100.0
Democratic hold			

=== District 70 ===
The incumbent Democrat Cynthia Neeley, who was re-elected with 79.35% of the vote in 2024, ran for re-election. The Republicans who filed for this district were Larry Hutchinson and Rob Waskoviak. Hutchinson won the primary with 61% of the vote.

Democratic primary results
Party	Candidate	Votes	%
Democratic	Cynthia Neeley (incumbent)	9,915	93.42
Write-in		699	6.58
Total votes		10,617	100.0

Republican primary results
Party	Candidate	Votes	%
Republican	Larry Hutchinson	872	60.77
Republican	Rob Waskoviak	563	39.23
Total votes		1,435	100.0

General election results
Party	Candidate	Votes	%
Democratic	Cynthia Neeley (incumbent)	23,138	81.80
Republican	Larry Hutchinson	5,148	18.20
Total votes		28,286	100.0
Democratic hold			

=== District 71 ===
The incumbent Republican Brian BeGole, who was re-elected with 62.63% of the vote in 2024, ran for re-election. The only Democrat who filed for this district was Stephen Schlaack, a member of the Owosso planning commission.

Republican primary results
Party	Candidate	Votes	%
Republican	Brian BeGole (incumbent)	10,460	100
Total votes		10,460	100.0

Democratic primary results
Party	Candidate	Votes	%
Democratic	Stephen Schlaack	11,005	100
Total votes		11,005	100.0

General election results
Party	Candidate	Votes	%
Republican	Brian BeGole (incumbent)	26,647	59.69
Democratic	Stephen Schlaack	17,997	40.31
Total votes		44,644	100.0
Republican hold			

=== District 72 ===
The incumbent Republican Mike Mueller, who was re-elected with 60.80% of the vote in 2024, ran for re-election. The only Democrat who filed for this district was Thomas Ryan.

Republican primary results
Party	Candidate	Votes	%
Republican	Mike Mueller (incumbent)	9,183	100
Total votes		9,183	100.0

Democratic primary results
Party	Candidate	Votes	%
Democratic	Thomas Ryan	11,808	100
Total votes		11,808	100.0

General election results
Party	Candidate	Votes	%
Republican	Mike Mueller (incumbent)	26,494	54.61
Democratic	Thomas Ryan	22,023	45.39
Total votes		48,517	100.0
Republican hold			

=== District 73 ===
The incumbent Democrat Julie Brixie, who was re-elected with 54.78% of the vote in 2024, ran for re-election. Republicans who filed for this district included Daniel Ewart, Norm Grant, and Joshua Rockey. Rockey won their primary with 40% of the vote.

Democratic primary results
Party	Candidate	Votes	%
Democratic	Julie Brixie (incumbent)	12,710	100
Total votes		12,710	100.0

Republican primary results
Party	Candidate	Votes	%
Republican	Joshua Rockey	2,270	39.69
Republican	Daniel Ewart	1,962	34.31
Republican	Norm Grant	1,487	26.00
Total votes		5,719	100.0

General election results
Party	Candidate	Votes	%
Democratic	Julie Brixie (incumbent)	24,565	60.76
Republican	Joshua Rockey	15,866	39.24
Total votes		40,431	100.0
Democratic hold			

=== District 74 ===
The incumbent Democrat Kara Hope, who was re-elected with 64.25% of the vote in 2024, retired. Democrats running to succeed Hope included teacher Aaron Iturralde and Harold Pope, the president of the Lansing NAACP. Democrat Tyjuan Thirdgill also filed for this district, and the only Republican who filed is Clinton Tarver. Pope won the Democratic primary with 47% of the vote, while Tarver won the Republican primary unopposed.

Democratic primary results
Party	Candidate	Votes	%
Democratic	Harold Pope	7,186	46.62
Democratic	TyJuan Thirdgill	4,397	28.52
Democratic	Aaron Iturralde	3,833	24.86
Total votes		15,416	100.0

Republican primary results
Party	Candidate	Votes	%
Republican	Clinton Tarver	3,997	100
Total votes		3,997	100.0

General election results
Party	Candidate	Votes	%
Democratic	Harold Pope	28,909	73.11
Republican	Clinton Tarver	10,633	26.89
Total votes		39,542	100.0
Democratic hold			

=== District 75 ===
The incumbent Democrat Penelope Tsernoglou, who was re-elected with 59.11% of the vote in 2024, ran for re-election. The only Republican who filed for this district was Frank Lambert.

Democratic primary results
Party	Candidate	Votes	%
Democratic	Penelope Tsernoglou (incumbent)	17,391	100
Total votes		17,391	100.0

Republican primary results
Party	Candidate	Votes	%
Republican	Frank Lambert	6,385	100
Total votes		6,385	100.0

General election results
Party	Candidate	Votes	%
Democratic	Penelope Tsernoglou (incumbent)	30,647	64.58
Republican	Frank Lambert	16,807	35.42
Total votes		47,454	100.0
Democratic hold			

=== District 76 ===
The incumbent Democrat Angela Witwer, who was re-elected with 54.78% of the vote in 2024, ran for re-election. Republicans who filed for this district included Bill Kaiser and John Ludtke. Kaiser won the primary with 69% of the vote.

Democratic primary results
Party	Candidate	Votes	%
Democratic	Angela Witwer (incumbent)	14,084	100
Total votes		14,084	100.0

Republican primary results
Party	Candidate	Votes	%
Republican	Bill Kaiser	5,239	69.24
Republican	John Ludtke	2,327	30.76
Total votes		7,566	100.0

General election results
Party	Candidate	Votes	%
Democratic	Angela Witwer (incumbent)	26,525	57.07
Republican	Bill Kaiser	19,955	42.93
Total votes		46,480	100.0
Democratic hold			

=== District 77 ===
The incumbent Democrat Emily Dievendorf, who was re-elected with 60.20% of the vote in 2024, ran for re-election. The only Republican who filed for this district was Sally Nelton. The Libertarian Party nominated Jennifer Long at a convention.

Democratic primary results
Party	Candidate	Votes	%
Democratic	Emily Dievendorf (incumbent)	15,735	100
Total votes		15,735	100.0

Republican primary results
Party	Candidate	Votes	%
Republican	Sally Nelton	5,306	100
Total votes		5,306	100.0

General election results
Party	Candidate	Votes	%
Democratic	Emily Dievendorf (incumbent)	29,019	65.02
Republican	Sally Nelton	14,388	32.24
Libertarian	Jennifer Long	1,222	2.74
Total votes		44,629	100.0
Democratic hold			

=== District 78 ===
The incumbent Republican Gina Johnsen, who was re-elected with 68.59% of the vote in 2024, retired to run for the state senate. Republican Ionia County commissioner Terence Frewen announced a campaign to succeed Johnsen, while Kaleb Hudson, Miguel Pilar, and Brandon Strong all filed paperwork for this district. Strong won the primary with 50% of the vote. The only Democrat who filed for this district was nurse Rachel Gross. The Libertarian Party nominated Ben DeJong at convention.

Republican primary results
Party	Candidate	Votes	%
Republican	Brandon Strong	5,743	50.26
Republican	Terence Frewen	3,027	26.49
Republican	Miguel Pilar	1,341	11.73
Republican	Kaleb Hudson	1,317	11.52
Total votes		11,428	100.0

Democratic primary results
Party	Candidate	Votes	%
Democratic	Rachel Gross	8,062	100
Total votes		8,062	100.0

General election results
Party	Candidate	Votes	%
Republican	Brandon Strong	24,212	59.76
Democratic	Rachel Gross	15,299	37.76
Libertarian	Ben DeJong	1,003	2.48
Total votes		40,514	100.0
Republican hold			

=== District 79 ===
The incumbent Republican Angela Rigas, who was re-elected with 66.21% of the vote in 2024, ran for re-election. The only Democrat who filed for this district was Zach Abbott.

Republican primary results
Party	Candidate	Votes	%
Republican	Angela Rigas (incumbent)	12,266	100
Total votes		12,266	100.0

Democratic primary results
Party	Candidate	Votes	%
Democratic	Zach Abbott	9,252	100
Total votes		9,252	100.0

General election results
Party	Candidate	Votes	%
Republican	Angela Rigas (incumbent)	29,659	61.29
Democratic	Zach Abbott	18,730	38.71
Total votes		48,389	100.0
Republican hold			

=== District 80 ===
The incumbent Democrat Phil Skaggs, who was re-elected with 57.14% of the vote in 2024, retired to run for the state senate. Kent County commissioner Kris Pachla announced a campaign for this district, while Lily Cheng-Schulting and Kristen Fauson both filed paperwork. Cheng-Schulting won the primary with 40% of the vote. The only Republican who filed for this district was Doug Lee.

Democratic primary results
Party	Candidate	Votes	%
Democratic	Lily Cheng-Schulting	6,823	40.40
Democratic	Kris Pachla	5,344	31.64
Democratic	Kristen Fauson	4,723	27.96
Total votes		16,890	100.0

Republican primary results
Party	Candidate	Votes	%
Republican	Doug Lee	7,254	100
Total votes		7,254	100.0

General election results
Party	Candidate	Votes	%
Democratic	Lily Cheng-Schulting	29,074	63.19
Republican	Doug Lee	16,937	36.81
Total votes		46,011	100.0
Democratic hold			

=== District 81 ===
The incumbent Democrat Stephen Wooden, who was elected with 55.71% of the vote in 2024, ran for re-election. The only Republican who filed for this district was Holly DeBoer.

Democratic primary results
Party	Candidate	Votes	%
Democratic	Stephen Wooden (incumbent)	16,540	100
Total votes		16,540	100.0

Republican primary results
Party	Candidate	Votes	%
Republican	Holly DeBoer	8,081	100
Total votes		8,081	100.0

General election results
Party	Candidate	Votes	%
Democratic	Stephen Wooden (incumbent)	30,038	61.01
Republican	Holly DeBoer	19,199	38.99
Total votes		49,237	100.0
Democratic hold			

=== District 82 ===
The incumbent Democrat Kristian Grant, who was re-elected with 75.07% of the vote in 2024, ran for re-election. Another Democrat, Robert Womack, filed for this district, but Grant won the primary with 74% of the vote. The only Republican who filed for this district was Ryan Malinoski, the nominee for this district in 2024. This will be a rematch of the 2024 election.

Democratic primary results
Party	Candidate	Votes	%
Democratic	Kristian Grant (incumbent)	12,065	74.04
Democratic	Robert Womack	4,230	25.96
Total votes		16,295	100.0

Republican primary results
Party	Candidate	Votes	%
Republican	Ryan Malinoski	2,737	100
Total votes		2,737	100.0

General election results
Party	Candidate	Votes	%
Democratic	Kristian Grant (incumbent)	29,563	80.19
Republican	Ryan Malinoski	7,301	19.81
Total votes		36,864	100.0
Democratic hold			

=== District 83 ===
The incumbent Democrat John Wesley Fitzgerald, who was re-elected with 53.12% of the vote in 2024, ran for re-election. The only Republican who filed for this district was Cindy Ramirez.

Democratic primary results
Party	Candidate	Votes	%
Democratic	John Wesley Fitzgerald (incumbent)	8,646	100
Total votes		8,646	100.0

Republican primary results
Party	Candidate	Votes	%
Republican	Cindy Ramirez	4,671	100
Total votes		4,671	100.0

General election results
Party	Candidate	Votes	%
Democratic	John Wesley Fitzgerald (incumbent)	20,500	62.47
Republican	Cindy Ramirez	12,317	37.53
Total votes		32,817	100.0
Democratic hold			

=== District 84 ===
The incumbent Democrat Carol Glanville, who was re-elected with 55.06% of the vote in 2024, retired to run for the state senate. Democrats Khristian Silvis, a U.S. Army veteran, and Justin Rackham ran to succeed Glanville, who endorsed Silvis. Silvis won the primary with 79% of the vote. The only Republican running for this district was Drew Jake Robbins, a former president of the Grand Rapids City Commission.

Democratic primary results
Party	Candidate	Votes	%
Democratic	Khristian Silvis	11,252	78.91
Democratic	Justin Rackham	3,007	21.09
Total votes		14,259	100.0

Republican primary results
Party	Candidate	Votes	%
Republican	Drew Jake Robbins	6,962	100
Total votes		6,962	100.0

General election results
Party	Candidate	Votes	%
Democratic	Khristian Silvis	26,618	60.52
Republican	Drew Jake Robbins	17,363	39.48
Total votes		43,981	100.0
Democratic hold			

=== District 85 ===
The incumbent Republican Bradley Slagh, who was re-elected with 70.39% of the vote in 2024, ran for re-election. Slagh defeated a primary challenger, John O'Brien, with 84% of the vote. The only Democrat who filed for this district was Richard Abraham.

Republican primary results
Party	Candidate	Votes	%
Republican	Bradley Slagh (incumbent)	12,891	83.69
Republican	John O'Brien	2,513	16.31
Total votes		15,404	100.0

Democratic primary results
Party	Candidate	Votes	%
Democratic	Richard Abraham	7,337	100
Total votes		7,337	100.0

General election results
Party	Candidate	Votes	%
Republican	Bradley Slagh (incumbent)	32,908	67.49
Democratic	Richard Abraham	15,849	32.51
Total votes		48,757	100.0
Republican hold			

=== District 86 ===
The incumbent Republican Nancy DeBoer, who was re-elected with 56.10% of the vote in 2024, ran for re-election. The only Democrat running for this district was Joseph McClusky.

Republican primary results
Party	Candidate	Votes	%
Republican	Nancy DeBoer (incumbent)	10,363	100
Total votes		10,363	100.0

Democratic primary results
Party	Candidate	Votes	%
Democratic	Joseph McClusky	11,172	100
Total votes		11,172	100.0

General election results
Party	Candidate	Votes	%
Democratic	Joseph McClusky	22,751	51.72
Republican	Nancy DeBoer (incumbent)	21,241	48.28
Total votes		43,992	100.0
Democratic gain from Republican			

=== District 87 ===
The incumbent Democrat Will Snyder, who was re-elected with 59.33% of the vote in 2024, ran for re-election. The only Republican who filed for this district was Cody Chipman.

Democratic primary results
Party	Candidate	Votes	%
Democratic	Will Snyder (incumbent)	10,453	100
Total votes		10,453	100.0

Republican primary results
Party	Candidate	Votes	%
Republican	Cody Chipman	4,447	100
Total votes		4,447	100.0

General election results
Party	Candidate	Votes	%
Democratic	Will Snyder (incumbent)	22,683	65.55
Republican	Cody Chipman	11,919	34.45
Total votes		34,602	100.0
Democratic hold			

=== District 88 ===
The incumbent Republican Greg VanWoerkom, who was re-elected with 56.97% of the vote in 2024, ran for re-election. Another Republican, Ethan Frasier, filed for this district as well. VanWoerkom defeated Frasier in the primary with 90% of the vote. The only Democrat who ran for this district was Kiel Reid, a small business owner.

Republican primary results
Party	Candidate	Votes	%
Republican	Greg VanWoerkom (incumbent)	11,482	90.06
Republican	Ethan Frasier	1,267	9.94
Total votes		12,749	100.0

Democratic primary results
Party	Candidate	Votes	%
Democratic	Kiel Reid	13,148	100
Total votes		13,148	100.0

General election results
Party	Candidate	Votes	%
Republican	Greg VanWoerkom (incumbent)	27,679	53.94
Democratic	Kiel Reid	23,639	46.06
Total votes		51,318	100.0
Republican hold			

=== District 89 ===
The incumbent Republican Luke Meerman, who was re-elected with 69.31% of the vote in 2024, retired. Republicans seeking to succeed Meerman included Patrick Kapenga and Joe Moss, an Ottawa County commissioner and co-founder of Ottawa Impact. Moss won the primary with 55% of the vote. The only Democrat who filed for this district was Meegan Zickus.

Republican primary results
Party	Candidate	Votes	%
Republican	Joe Moss	7,216	54.85
Republican	Patrick Kapenga	5,941	45.15
Total votes		13,157	100.0

Democratic primary results
Party	Candidate	Votes	%
Democratic	Meegan Zickus	7,235	100
Total votes		7,235	100.0

General election results
Party	Candidate	Votes	%
Republican	Joe Moss	26,907	62.42
Democratic	Meegan Zickus	16,200	37.58
Total votes		43,107	100.0
Republican hold			

=== District 90 ===
The incumbent Republican Bryan Posthumus, who was re-elected with 63.52% of the vote in 2024, retired. Republicans who filed for this district included former state representative Lynn Afendoulis, Susannah Watts, Andrew Willis, and Jordan Youngquist. Afendoulis won the primary with 49% of the vote. The only Democrat running for this district was Courtland Township trustee Rachel Crowther.

Republican primary results
Party	Candidate	Votes	%
Republican	Lynn Afendoulis	6,648	49.47
Republican	Susannah Watts	4,219	31.40
Republican	Andrew Willis	1,831	13.63
Republican	Jordan Youngquist	739	5.50
Total votes		13,436	100.0

Democratic primary results
Party	Candidate	Votes	%
Democratic	Rachel Crowther	12,027	100
Total votes		12,027	100.0

General election results
Party	Candidate	Votes	%
Republican	Lynn Afendoulis	29,216	57.30
Democratic	Rachel Crowther	21,772	42.70
Total votes		50,988	100.0
Republican hold			

=== District 91 ===
The incumbent Republican Pat Outman, who was re-elected with 71.45% of the vote in 2024, ran for re-election. The only Democrat who filed for this district was carpenter Frank Lafata.

Republican primary results
Party	Candidate	Votes	%
Republican	Pat Outman (incumbent)	10,961	100
Total votes		10,961	100.0

Democratic primary results
Party	Candidate	Votes	%
Democratic	Frank Lafata	7,291	100
Total votes		7,291	100.0

General election results
Party	Candidate	Votes	%
Republican	Pat Outman (incumbent)	27,442	66.14
Democratic	Frank Lafata	14,049	33.86
Total votes		41,491	100.0
Republican hold			

=== District 92 ===
The incumbent Republican Jerry Neyer, who was re-elected with 57.52% of the vote in 2024, ran for re-election. The only Democrat who filed for this district was Luke Del Castillo.

Republican primary results
Party	Candidate	Votes	%
Republican	Jerry Neyer (incumbent)	7,185	100
Total votes		7,185	100.0

Democratic primary results
Party	Candidate	Votes	%
Democratic	Luke Del Castillo	8,082	100
Total votes		8,082	100.0

General election results
Party	Candidate	Votes	%
Republican	Jerry Neyer (incumbent)	18,949	54.03
Democratic	Luke Del Castillo	16,122	45.97
Total votes		35,071	100.0
Republican hold			

=== District 93 ===
The incumbent Republican Tim Kelly, who was elected with 68.97% of the vote in 2024, ran for re-election. The only Democrat who filed for this district was Serenity Hope Salak, a substitute teacher and candidate for Michigan's 35th Senate district's special election in 2026.

Republican primary results
Party	Candidate	Votes	%
Republican	Tim Kelly (incumbent)	10,687	100
Total votes		10,687	100.0

Democratic primary results
Party	Candidate	Votes	%
Democratic	Serenity Hope Salak	8,431	100
Total votes		8,431	100.0

General election results
Party	Candidate	Votes	%
Republican	Tim Kelly (incumbent)	26,923	64.66
Democratic	Serenity Hope Salak	14,716	35.34
Total votes		41,639	100.0
Republican hold			

=== District 94 ===
The incumbent Democrat Amos O'Neal, who was re-elected with 68.87% of the vote in 2024, ran for re-election. The only Republican who filed for this district was Don Sugg.

Democratic primary results
Party	Candidate	Votes	%
Democratic	Amos O'Neal (incumbent)	11,929	100
Total votes		11,929	100.0

Republican primary results
Party	Candidate	Votes	%
Republican	Don Sugg	3,571	100
Total votes		3,571	100.0

General election results
Party	Candidate	Votes	%
Democratic	Amos O'Neal (incumbent)	24,586	72.54
Republican	Don Sugg	9,308	27.46
Total votes		33,894	100.0
Democratic hold			

=== District 95 ===
The incumbent Republican Bill G. Schuette, who was re-elected with 64.29% of the vote in 2024, ran for re-election. Democrats who filed for this district included teacher AnnMarie Horseman and mechanic Gary VanBlaricum. Horseman won their primary with 80% of the vote.

Republican primary results
Party	Candidate	Votes	%
Republican	Bill G. Schuette (incumbent)	10,094	100
Total votes		10,094	100.0

Democratic primary results
Party	Candidate	Votes	%
Democratic	AnnMarie Horseman	8,777	79.60
Democratic	Gary VanBlaricum	2,249	20.40
Total votes		11,026	100.0

General election results
Party	Candidate	Votes	%
Republican	Bill G. Schuette (incumbent)	26,568	58.56
Democratic	AnnMarie Horseman	18,802	41.44
Total votes		45,370	100.0
Republican hold			

=== District 96 ===
The incumbent Republican Timothy Beson, who was re-elected with 60.33% of the vote in 2024, ran for re-election. The only Democrat running for this district was Bay City mayor Chris Girard.

Republican primary results
Party	Candidate	Votes	%
Republican	Timothy Beson (incumbent)	8,577	100
Total votes		8,577	100.0

Democratic primary results
Party	Candidate	Votes	%
Democratic	Chris Girard	12,297	100
Total votes		12,297	100.0

General election results
Party	Candidate	Votes	%
Republican	Timothy Beson (incumbent)	22,607	52.91
Democratic	Chris Girard	20,119	47.09
Total votes		42,726	100.0
Republican hold			

=== District 97 ===
The incumbent Republican Matthew Bierlein, who was re-elected with 70.36% of the vote in 2024, retired to run for the state senate. Republicans running for this district included U.S. Army veteran Briar Bearss and Saginaw County commissioner Mike Piotrowski. The Democrats who filed for this district were Jack Bader and Kandie Sherman. Bearss and Bader won their respective primaries and will face each other in the general election.

Republican primary results
Party	Candidate	Votes	%
Republican	Briar Bearss	8,889	68.44
Republican	Mark Piotrowski	4,099	31.56
Total votes		12,988	100.0

Democratic primary results
Party	Candidate	Votes	%
Democratic	Jack Bader	5,031	56.38
Democratic	Kandie Sherman	3,893	43.62
Total votes		8,924	100.0

General election results
Party	Candidate	Votes	%
Republican	Briar Bearss	27,030	62.84
Democratic	Jack Bader	15,985	37.16
Total votes		43,015	100.0
Republican hold			

=== District 98 ===
The incumbent Republican Gregory Alexander, who was re-elected with 74.02% of the vote in 2024, ran for re-election. The only Democrat who filed for this district was Keith Brusseau.

Republican primary results
Party	Candidate	Votes	%
Republican	Gregory Alexander (incumbent)	13,308	100
Total votes		13,308	100.0

Democratic primary results
Party	Candidate	Votes	%
Democratic	Keith Brusseau	6,545	100
Total votes		6,545	100.0

General election results
Party	Candidate	Votes	%
Republican	Gregory Alexander (incumbent)	30,020	72.01
Democratic	Keith Brusseau	11,670	27.99
Total votes		41,690	100.0
Republican hold			

=== District 99 ===
The incumbent Republican Mike Hoadley, who was re-elected with 71.09% of the vote in 2024, ran for re-election. The only Democrat who filed for this district was David Forgione. The Libertarian Party nominated Steven Jacob Lull at a convention.

Republican primary results
Party	Candidate	Votes	%
Republican	Mike Hoadley (incumbent)	12,798	100
Total votes		12,798	100.0

Democratic primary results
Party	Candidate	Votes	%
Democratic	David Forgione	8,228	100
Total votes		8,228	100.0

General election results
Party	Candidate	Votes	%
Republican	Mike Hoadley (incumbent)	28,841	66.72
Democratic	David Forgione	13,647	31.57
Libertarian	Steven Jacob Lull	738	1.71
Total votes		43,226	100.0
Republican hold			

=== District 100 ===
The incumbent Republican Tom Kunse, who was re-elected with 69.29% of the vote in 2024, ran for re-election. The only Democrat who filed for this district was businesswoman Tracy Ruell.

Republican primary results
Party	Candidate	Votes	%
Republican	Tom Kunse (incumbent)	11,625	100
Total votes		11,625	100.0

Democratic primary results
Party	Candidate	Votes	%
Democratic	Tracy Ruell	7,482	100
Total votes		7,482	100.0

General election results
Party	Candidate	Votes	%
Republican	Tom Kunse (incumbent)	27,530	65.57
Democratic	Tracy Ruell	14,454	34.43
Total votes		41,984	100.0
Republican hold			

=== District 101 ===
The incumbent Republican Joseph Fox, who was re-elected with 70.44% of the vote in 2024, retired to run for the state senate. Republicans who filed for this district included farmer Luke Eising, Gary Anderson, Jaxon Deur, Ben Townsend, and Rich Vance. Deur went on to win the primary with 26% of the vote. The only Democrat who filed for this district was Christopher Crain.

Republican primary results
Party	Candidate	Votes	%
Republican	Jaxon Deur	3,523	26.47
Republican	Rich Vance	3,415	25.66
Republican	Luke Eising	3,350	25.17
Republican	Gary Anderson	1,877	14.10
Republican	Ben Townsend	1,144	8.60
Total votes		13,309	100.0

Democratic primary results
Party	Candidate	Votes	%
Democratic	Christopher Crain	7,489	100
Total votes		7,489	100.0

General election results
Party	Candidate	Votes	%
Republican	Jaxon Deur	28,074	66.28
Democratic	Christopher Crain	14,282	33.72
Total votes		42,356	100.0
Republican hold			

=== District 102 ===
The incumbent Republican Curt VanderWall, who was re-elected with 63.79% of the vote in 2024, ran for re-election. The only Democrat who filed for this district was Angel Coon. The Libertarian Party nominated Shawn Orton at a convention.

Republican primary results
Party	Candidate	Votes	%
Republican	Curt VanderWall (incumbent)	11,629	100
Total votes		11,629	100.0

Democratic primary results
Party	Candidate	Votes	%
Democratic	Angel Coon	10,566	100
Total votes		10,566	100.0

General election results
Party	Candidate	Votes	%
Republican	Curt VanderWall (incumbent)	27,044	58.64
Democratic	Angel Coon	18,409	39.92
Libertarian	Shawn Orton	662	1.44
Total votes		46,115	100.0
Republican hold			

=== District 103 ===
the incumbent Democrat Betsy Coffia, who was re-elected with 52.09% of the vote in 2024, ran for re-election. The only Republican who filed for this district was Edwin Dean. The Libertarian Party nominated Michael Gorbe at a convention.

Democratic primary results
Party	Candidate	Votes	%
Democratic	Betsy Coffia (incumbent)	20,622	100
Total votes		20,622	100.0

Republican primary results
Party	Candidate	Votes	%
Republican	Edwin Dean	10,686	100
Total votes		10,686	100.0

General election results
Party	Candidate	Votes	%
Democratic	Betsy Coffia (incumbent)	32,823	57.19
Republican	Edwin Dean	23,780	41.43
Libertarian	Michael Gorbe	789	1.37
Total votes		57,392	100.0
Democratic hold			

=== District 104 ===
The incumbent Republican John Roth, who was re-elected with 62.93% of the vote in 2024, ran for re-election. The only Democrat who filed for this district was Mitchell Distin. The Libertarian Party nominated Alexander Jarvis at a convention.

Republican primary results
Party	Candidate	Votes	%
Republican	John Roth (incumbent)	13,046	100
Total votes		13,046	100.0

Democratic primary results
Party	Candidate	Votes	%
Democratic	Mitchell Distin	11,035	100
Total votes		11,035	100.0

General election results
Party	Candidate	Votes	%
Republican	John Roth (incumbent)	29,726	59.61
Democratic	Mitchell Distin	19,218	38.54
Libertarian	Alexander Jarvis	923	1.85
Total votes		49,867	100.0
Republican hold			

=== District 105 ===
The incumbent Republican Ken Borton, who was re-elected with 71.73% of the vote in 2024, ran for re-election. The only Democrat who filed for this district was Rachel Longendyke-Teeter. The Libertarian Party nominated Frank Tillman at convention.

Republican primary results
Party	Candidate	Votes	%
Republican	Ken Borton (incumbent)	13,960	100
Total votes		13,960	100.0

Democratic primary results
Party	Candidate	Votes	%
Democratic	Rachel Longendyke-Teeter	8,518	100
Total votes		8,518	100.0

General election results
Party	Candidate	Votes	%
Republican	Ken Borton (incumbent)	30,628	66.04
Democratic	Rachel Longendyke-Teeter	14,975	32.29
Libertarian	Frank Tillman	773	1.67
Total votes		46,376	100.0
Republican hold			

=== District 106 ===
The incumbent Republican Cam Cavitt, who was re-elected with 69.58% of the vote in 2024, ran for re-election. Democrats who filed for this district included Phillip Aderhold and Mary Hamilton. Hamilton defeated Aderhold in the primary with 63% of the vote.

Republican primary results
Party	Candidate	Votes	%
Republican	Cam Cavitt (incumbent)	13,886	100
Total votes		13,886	100.0

Democratic primary results
Party	Candidate	Votes	%
Democratic	Mary Hamilton	5,940	62.70
Democratic	Phillip Aderhold	3,534	37.30
Total votes		9,474	100.0

General election results
Party	Candidate	Votes	%
Republican	Cam Cavitt (incumbent)	31,872	68.64
Democratic	Mary Hamilton	14,561	31.36
Total votes		46,433	100.0
Republican hold			

=== District 107 ===
The incumbent Republican Parker Fairbairn, who was elected with 60.67% of the vote in 2024, ran for re-election. Democrats who filed for this district included Melissa Perron and Brendan Ryan. Perron won the primary with 62% of the vote.

Republican primary results
Party	Candidate	Votes	%
Republican	Parker Fairbairn (incumbent)	12,070	100
Total votes		12,070	100.0

Democratic primary results
Party	Candidate	Votes	%
Democratic	Melissa Perron	7,835	62.57
Democratic	Brendan Ryan	4,686	36.43
Total votes		12,521	100.0

General election results
Party	Candidate	Votes	%
Republican	Parker Fairbairn (incumbent)	28,127	57.42
Democratic	Melissa Perron	20,855	42.58
Total votes		48,982	100.0
Republican hold			

=== District 108 ===
The incumbent Republican David Prestin, who was re-elected with 66.36% of the vote in 2024, retired to run for the state senate.

Republicans running to succeed Prestin included Menominee mayor Casey Hoffman, Menominee County commissioner Larry Johnson, teacher Christopher Reynolds, Mackinac County commissioner Daryl Schroeder, and Steven Viau. One more Republican, Kurt Perron, also filed to run in this district. Johnson went on to win the primary with 30% of the vote. The only Democrat who filed for this district was Rachel Keys.

Republican primary results
Party	Candidate	Votes	%
Republican	Larry Johnson	3,470	29.60
Republican	Casey Hoffman	2,283	19.48
Republican	Daryl Schroeder	2,017	17.21
Republican	Christopher Reynolds	1,606	13.70
Republican	Steven Viau	1,291	11.01
Republican	Kurt Perron	1,054	8.99
Total votes		11,721	100.0

Democratic primary results
Party	Candidate	Votes	%
Democratic	Rachel Keys	7,981	100
Total votes		7,981	100.0

General election results
Party	Candidate	Votes	%
Republican	Larry Johnson	25,051	62.81
Democratic	Rachel Keys	14,833	37.19
Total votes		39,884	100.0
Republican hold			

=== District 109 ===
The incumbent Republican Karl Bohnak, who was elected with 51.61% of the vote in 2024, ran for re-election. The only Democrat running for this district was physician assistant Anna Aho Rink.

Republican primary results
Party	Candidate	Votes	%
Republican	Karl Bohnak (incumbent)	9,604	100
Total votes		9,604	100.0

Democratic primary results
Party	Candidate	Votes	%
Democratic	Anna Aho Rink	13,778	100
Total votes		13,778	100.0

General election results
Party	Candidate	Votes	%
Democratic	Anna Aho Rink	23,811	53.61
Republican	Karl Bohnak (incumbent)	20,602	46.39
Total votes		44,413	100.0
Democratic gain from Republican			

=== District 110 ===
The incumbent Republican Gregory Markkanen, who was re-elected with 63.07% of the vote in 2024, ran for re-election. The only Democrat who filed for this district is Houghton city councilor Brian Irizarry.

Republican primary results
Party	Candidate	Votes	%
Republican	Gregory Markkanen (incumbent)	9,909	100
Total votes		9,909	100.0

Democratic primary results
Party	Candidate	Votes	%
Democratic	Brian Irizarry	9,159	100
Total votes		9,159	100.0

General election results
Party	Candidate	Votes	%
Republican	Gregory Markkanen (incumbent)	24,237	58.95
Democratic	Brian Irizarry	16,876	41.05
Total votes		41,113	100.0
Republican hold			
