= Harold Pope =

Harold Pope may refer to:

- Harold Pope (cricketer), English cricketer
- Harold Pope Jr., member of the New Mexico Senate
- Harold Pope (Michigan politician), member-elect of the Michigan House of Representatives
- Harold Pope (soldier), Australian Army officer
