= Joe Moss (Michigan politician) =

American politician

Member-elect of the Michigan House of Representatives from the 89th district
- Assuming office January 1, 2027
- Succeeding: Luke Meerman

Personal details
- Born: Hudsonville, Michigan
- Party: Republican
- Education: Cedarville University
- Website: Campaign website

Joe Moss is an American politician who is the member-elect for the 89th district of the Michigan House of Representatives. He was elected at the 2026 election. He is an Ottawa County commissioner. In 2024, he ran for mayor of Hudsonville, Michigan.
