= Kimberly Fisher =

American politician

Member-elect of the Michigan House of Representatives from the 11th district
- Assuming office January 1, 2027
- Succeeding: Donavan McKinney

Personal details
- Party: Democratic
- Website: votekimberlyfisher.com

Kimberly Fisher is an American politician who is the member-elect for the 11th district of the Michigan House of Representatives. She was elected at the 2026 election. She attended Detroit Public Schools.
