= Michigan's 68th House of Representatives district =

American legislative district

Michigan's 68th State House of Representatives district
Representative
David Martin; R–Davison
- Demographics: 81.9% White; 6.3% Black; 4% Hispanic; 1.9% Asian; 0.1% Native American; 0.4% Other; 5.3% Multiracial
- Population (2024): 94,011

Michigan's 68th House of Representatives district (also referred to as Michigan's 68th House district) is a legislative district within the Michigan House of Representatives located in parts of Genesee and Oakland counties. The district was created in 1965, when the Michigan House of Representatives district naming scheme changed from a county-based system to a numerical one.

== List of representatives ==
Representative	Party	Dates	Residence	Notes
William Hayward	Republican	1965–1976	Royal Oak	
David L. Campbell	Republican	1977–1980	Clawson	
Shirley Johnson	Republican	1981–1992	Royal Oak	
Dianne Byrum	Democratic	1993–1994	Holt	
Lingg Brewer	Democratic	1995–2000	Holt	
Virgil Bernero	Democratic	2001–2002	Lansing	
Michael C. Murphy	Democratic	2003–2006	Lansing	
Joan Bauer	Democratic	2007–2012	Lansing	
Andy Schor	Democratic	2013–2018	Lansing	Resigned
Sarah Anthony	Democratic	2018–2022	Lansing	
David Martin	Republican	2023–present	Davison	
Matt Schlinker	Democratic	(Note: Member-elect.)	Goodrich	

== Recent elections ==
=== 2020s ===
2026 Michigan House of Representatives election
Party	Candidate	Votes	%
Democratic	Matt Schlinker	22,822	50.16
Republican	David W. Martin (incumbent)	21,548	47.36
Libertarian	Deanna L Martin	698	1.53
Independent	Joe McHugh	429	0.94
Total votes		45,497	100
Democratic gain from Republican			

2024 Michigan House of Representatives election
Party	Candidate	Votes	%
Republican	David W. Martin (incumbent)	29,402	54.5
Democratic	Matt Schlinker	24,554	45.5
Total votes		53,956	100
Republican hold			

2022 Michigan House of Representatives election
Party	Candidate	Votes	%
Republican	David W. Martin	23,145	54.7
Democratic	Cheri Hardmon	19,149	45.3
Total votes		42,249	100
Republican hold			

2020 Michigan House of Representatives election
Party	Candidate	Votes	%
Democratic	Sarah Anthony	33,760	75.9
Republican	Robert Atkinson	10,714	24.1
Total votes		44,474	100
Democratic hold			

2018 Michigan House of Representatives election
Party	Candidate	Votes	%
Democratic	Sarah Anthony	26,664	74.9
Republican	Rosalinda Hernandez	8,210	23.1
Green	Robin Lea Laurain	724	2.0
Total votes		35,598	100
Democratic hold			

2016 Michigan House of Representatives election
Party	Candidate	Votes	%
Democratic	Andy Schor	28,373	73.0
Republican	Randy Pilon	8,365	21.5
Libertarian	Robert Powell	2,132	5.5
Total votes		38,870	100
Democratic hold			

2014 Michigan House of Representatives election
Party	Candidate	Votes	%
Democratic	Andy Schor	18,471	76.6
Republican	Rob Secaur	5,629	23.4
Total votes		24,100	100
Democratic hold			

2012 Michigan House of Representatives election
Party	Candidate	Votes	%
Democratic	Andy Schor	29,023	76.6
Republican	Timothy Moede	8,861	23.4
Total votes		37,884	100
Democratic hold			

2010 Michigan House of Representatives election
Party	Candidate	Votes	%
Democratic	Joan Bauer	18,588	72.9
Republican	Timothy Moede	6,909	27.1
Total votes		25,497	100.0
Democratic hold			

2008 Michigan House of Representatives election
Party	Candidate	Votes	%
Democratic	Joan Bauer	33,866	77.8
Republican	David Irons	8,797	20.2
Constitution	DelRae Finnerty	889	2.0
Total votes		43,552	100
Democratic hold			

== Historical district boundaries ==
Map	Description	Apportionment Plan	Notes
	Oakland County (part): Royal Oak (part)	1964 Apportionment Plan	
	Oakland County (part): Berkley; Clawson; Royal Oak (part)	1972 Apportionment Plan	
	Oakland County (part): Clawson; Royal Oak; Pleasant Ridge	1982 Apportionment Plan	
	Ingham County (part): Alaiedon Township; Aurelius Township; Delhi Charter Township; Lansing (part); Lansing Township (part)	1992 Apportionment Plan	
	Ingham County (part): Lansing (part); Lansing Township	2001 Apportionment Plan	
	Ingham County (part): Lansing (part); Lansing Township (part)	2011 Apportionment Plan	
