= Brandon Strong =

American politician

Member-elect of the Michigan House of Representatives from the 78th district
- Assuming office January 1, 2027
- Succeeding: Gina Johnsen

Personal details
- Party: Republican
- Education: South Dakota State University
- Website: brandonstrong.org

Brandon L. Strong is an American politician who is the member-elect for the 78th district of the Michigan House of Representatives. He was elected at the 2026 election. He defeated four Republican candidates in the primary election.
