= Lisa McIntyre =

American politician

Member-elect of the Michigan House of Representatives from the 22nd district
- Assuming office January 1, 2027
- Succeeding: Matt Koleszar

Personal details
- Party: Democratic
- Education: University of Michigan
- Website: Campaign website

Lisa McIntyre is an American politician who is the member-elect for the 22nd district of the Michigan House of Representatives. She was elected at the 2026 election. She is a former president and treasurer of the Northville Board of Education. She is a school board member.
