= David Martin (Michigan politician) =

American politician

Member of the Michigan House of Representatives
- Incumbent
- Assumed office January 1, 2021
- Preceded by: Sheryl Kennedy
- Succeeded by: Matt Schlinker (elect)
- Constituency: 48th district (2021–2022); 68th district (2023–present)

Personal details
- Born: May 12, 1961 (age 65)
- Party: Republican

David Martin (born May 12, 1961) is an American Republican politician from Michigan. He was elected to the Michigan House of Representatives from the 48th district in 2020, defeating incumbent representative Sheryl Kennedy.

== Career ==
Prior to his role as state representative, Martin served on the Davison City Council, and was the director of Security and Facilities at the Pontiac Silver Dome.

In 2020, Martin became the first GOP candidate to win the seat since the 1990s.

After redistricting, in 2022, Martin was elected to the 68th district. He was reelected in 2024. He defeated Democrat Matt Schlinker.

Rep. Martin secured $4.4 million for Road investment in the Michigan budget for Davison after a $11.7 million water system improvement project in Davison. Rep. Martin stated about the road investment “This funding will allow Davison to complete these projects the right way — fixing the roads and the water system at the same time,” Martin said. “Without this support, the city would have been left with a patchwork of repairs that would only make things worse down the road. By working together, we’re delivering safe, reliable water service and smooth, safer streets for Davison residents.”

In 2026, he was unseated by Democrat Matt Schlinker.
