= Willie Burton (politician) =

American politician

Member-elect of the Michigan House of Representatives from the 9th district
- Assuming office January 1, 2027
- Succeeding: Joe Tate

Personal details
- Party: Democratic
- Website: willieburton.com

Willie Burton is an American politician who is the member-elect for the 9th district of the Michigan House of Representatives. He was elected at the 2026 election. He is a Detroit police commissioner.
