= Briar Bearss =

American politician

Member-elect of the Michigan House of Representatives from the 97th district
- Assuming office January 1, 2027
- Succeeding: Matthew Bierlein

Personal details
- Party: Republican
- Education: United States Military Academy
- Website: www.bearssformichigan.com

Briar J. Bearss is an American politician who is the member-elect for the 97th district of the Michigan House of Representatives. He was elected at the 2026 election. He was born at Marquette General Hospital. He is a military veteran and a 2022 West Point graduate.
