= Khristian Silvis =

American politician

Member-elect of the Michigan House of Representatives from the 84th district
- Assuming office January 1, 2027
- Succeeding: Carol Glanville

Personal details
- Party: Democratic
- Website: Campaign website

Khristian Silvis is an American politician who is the member-elect for the 84th district of the Michigan House of Representatives. She was elected in the 2026 election.

She is a veteran of the United States Army. She was district director for Michigan Congresswoman Hillary Scholten. She also worked for New York Congressman Sean Patrick Maloney.
