= David L. Campbell =

American politician (born 1944)

Member of the Michigan House of Representatives from the 68th district
- In office January 1, 1977 – December 31, 1980
- Preceded by: William Hayward
- Succeeded by: Shirley Johnson

Personal details
- Born: March 15, 1944 (age 82)
- Party: Republican
- Education: Michigan State University; University of Detroit

David L. Campbell (born March 15, 1944) was a Michigan politician.

== Early life ==
Campbell was born on March 15, 1944.

== Education ==
Campbell earned a B.A in political science from Michigan State University and a J.D from the University of Detroit.

== Career ==
Campbell was an attorney, and a member of multiple bar associations, including the American Bar Association, Michigan Bar Association, and Oakland County Bar Association. On November 2, 1976, Campbell was elected to the Michigan House of Representatives where he represented the 68th district from January 12, 1977 to December 31, 1980. In 1982, Campbell was an unsuccessful candidate in the Republican primary for the Michigan Senate seat representing the 16th district.

== Personal life ==
Campbell married in 1972 and had three children. Campbell lived in Clawson, Michigan during his time in the legislature. Campbell is Protestant.
