= Nancy DeBoer =

American politician from Michigan

Nancy R. DeBoer

Member of the Michigan House of Representatives from the 86th district
- Incumbent
- Assumed office January 1, 2023
- Preceded by: Thomas Albert
- Succeeded by: Joseph McClusky (elect)

Mayor of Holland
- In office November 9, 2015 – November 1, 2019
- Preceded by: Bob Vande Vusse
- Succeeded by: Nathan Bocks

Personal details
- Born: Grand Rapids, Michigan, U.S.
- Party: Republican
- Education: Calvin College

Nancy R. DeBoer is an American politician from Michigan. A member of the Republican Party, she was elected to the Michigan House of Representatives in the 2022 election from 86th district.

== Early life and career ==
DeBoer has a bachelor's degree in secondary education from Calvin University.

Before entering local politics, DeBoer was a high school educator, teaching English at Holland Christian High School.

She was also a local morning radio talk show host at 1260 “The Pledge” for two years and for 17 years served as the executive director of the West Michigan Character Council.

== City politics ==
DeBoer was a part of city government for 14 years on the Holland, Michigan city council, the first ten years as an at-large councilmember (2005–2015) and served two terms as mayor (2015–2019).

== Michigan House of Representatives ==
In 2022, DeBoer ran for state House in District 86, an open seat created during the 2020 redistricting cycle. District 86 encompasses all of the City of Holland, as well as all of Park Township and most of Holland Charter Township in Ottawa County and all of Laketown Township in Allegan County.

In the 2022 Republican primary, DeBoer defeated Seth Getz 62% to 38%.

In the 2022 general election, she defeated Democrat Larry Jackson 56.2% to 43.8%.

In the 2024 Michigan House of Representatives election, DeBoer defeated Democrat Abby Klomparens 56.3% to 43.7%.

In the 2026 Michigan House of Representatives election, she was unseated by Democrat Joseph McClusky.
