= Kara Hope =

American politician

Member of the Michigan House of Representatives
- Incumbent
- Assumed office January 1, 2019
- Preceded by: Tom Cochran
- Succeeded by: Harold Pope (elect)
- Constituency: 67th district (2019–2022); 74th district (2023–present)

Personal details
- Party: Democratic
- Education: Michigan State University (BA); Cooley Law School (JD)
- Website: Vote Kara Hope

Kara Hope is an American politician. A member of the Democratic Party, Hope has represented the 74th district in the Michigan House of Representatives since 2023, previously representing the 67th district. She was reelected in 2024.

Before being elected to the state legislature, she served as an Ingham County Commissioner from 2013 to 2018. Prior to that she worked as a defense attorney and as an adjunct professor at her alma mater Cooley Law School. She also wrote for the Ionia Daily News.

Political offices
Preceded by Tom Cochran	Michigan Representatives; 67th District; 2019–2022	Succeeded by Phil Green
Preceded by Carol Glanville	Michigan Representatives; 74th District; 2023–present	Succeeded by Harold Pope (elect)
