= Alex Hawkins (politician) =

American politician from Michigan

Member of the Michigan House of Representatives from the 55th district
- Elect
- Assuming office January 1, 2027
- Succeeding: Mark Tisdel

Personal details
- Party: Democratic

Military service
- Allegiance: United States
- Branch/service: United States Army; Army National Guard
- Unit: Explosive ordnance disposal

Alex Hawkins is an American politician and military officer who was elected to the Michigan House of Representatives from the 55th district in 2026. A member of the Democratic Party, he defeated three-term Republican incumbent Mark Tisdel in the November 3, 2026, general election. Hawkins is a United States Army veteran and an explosive ordnance disposal officer in the Army National Guard.

== Early life and education ==
Hawkins grew up in Waterford Township in Oakland County and attended Oakland County public schools. His father died by suicide when Hawkins was eight years old, and he was raised by a single mother. His grandfather, a Vietnam War veteran, later served in the Florida Legislature.

As of 2026, Hawkins was completing a master's degree in public administration.

== Military and public service ==
Hawkins served in the United States Army and is an explosive ordnance disposal officer in the Army National Guard. He is also a reserve deputy with the Oakland County Sheriff's Office.

After active duty, Hawkins was a congressional fellow for then-U.S. Representative Elissa Slotkin through a veterans fellowship, working as a field representative in Lansing and handling constituent services and veterans' casework. He also worked briefly in the office of U.S. Senator Gary Peters.

== Political career ==
=== 2024 state House campaign ===
Hawkins first ran for the 55th district seat in 2024. He lost the Democratic primary on August 6, 2024, to Trevis Harrold, receiving 4,347 votes (47.2%) to Harrold's 4,859 (52.8%). Harrold lost the general election to Tisdel.

=== 2025 congressional campaign ===
In early 2025, Hawkins announced a campaign for Michigan's 10th congressional district, challenging Republican U.S. Representative John James. In September 2025, he ended that campaign and returned to the 55th state House district race.

=== 2026 state House election ===
Hawkins and Tisdel were each unopposed in their party primaries on August 4, 2026. The district, which covers Rochester, Rochester Hills and part of Oakland Township, had split its ticket in 2024, supporting Slotkin for U.S. Senate and Tisdel for the state House, and the race was considered one of several that could decide control of the chamber.

During the campaign, Hawkins focused on public school funding, health care access, housing affordability and government accountability. He opposed Republican proposals to eliminate property taxes, arguing they would cut school funding, and supported local resolutions urging police departments and sheriff's offices not to enter contracts with U.S. Immigration and Customs Enforcement absent a judicial warrant. He also supported public financing of election campaigns. He was endorsed by Planned Parenthood Advocates of Michigan, VoteVets, former U.S. Representative Mark Schauer and U.S. Representative Jason Crow.

In the November 3, 2026, general election, Hawkins defeated Tisdel with 24,858 votes (51.8%) to 23,130 (48.2%), according to unofficial results with all 25 precincts reporting. His term is scheduled to begin on January 1, 2027.

== Electoral history ==
2024 Michigan House of Representatives 55th district Democratic primary
Party	Candidate	Votes	%
Democratic	Trevis Harrold	4,859	52.8
Democratic	Alex Hawkins	4,347	47.2
Total votes		9,206	100.0

2026 Michigan House of Representatives 55th district election (unofficial)
Party	Candidate	Votes	%
Democratic	Alex Hawkins	24,858	51.8
Republican	Mark Tisdel (incumbent)	23,130	48.2
Total votes		47,988	100.0
Democratic gain from Republican			

== Personal life ==
Hawkins lives in the Rochester area and has no children.
