= Kelly Garrett =

Kelly Garrett may refer to:

- Kelly Garrett (Charlie's Angels), a character on the TV series Charlie's Angels
- Kelly Garrett (actress) (1944–2013), American actress and singer
- Kelly Garrett (politician), American politician
