= Jen Strebs =

American politician

Member-elect of the Michigan House of Representatives from the 41st district
- Assuming office January 1, 2027
- Succeeding: Julie Rogers

Personal details
- Party: Democratic
- Education: Western Michigan University
- Website: Campaign website

Jen Strebs is an American politician who is the member-elect for the 41st district of the Michigan House of Representatives. She was elected at the 2026 election. She was chairwoman of the Kalamazoo County Board of Commissioners.
