= Joanna Whaley =

American politician (born 1980s)

Member-elect of the Michigan House of Representatives from the 2nd district
- Assuming office January 2027
- Succeeding: Tullio Liberati

Personal details
- Born: 1987 or 1988 (age 38–39)
- Party: Democratic
- Education: Eastern Michigan University
- Website: Campaign website

Joanna Whaley (born 1987 or 1988) is an American politician. She is the Democratic member-elect of the Michigan House of Representatives from the 2nd district. She is Michigan's first openly transgender state legislator. Prior to her victory, she was an evangelical megachurch pastor and podcaster.

== Biography ==
Joanna Whaley was born in either 1987 or 1988. She grew up in Trenton, in a Catholic family. She underwent Christian conversion therapy for 15 years due to her gender identity. She worked as a pastor at an evangelical megachurch for almost two decades before she was forced to resign in the winter of 2022, when her thoughts of gender transition where discovered by church leaders. Whaley lives in Lincoln Park.

Whaley came out as transgender and started publicly transitioning at age 34. After leaving the megachurch, she completed her degree at Eastern Michigan University. She also studied at Wartburg Theological Seminary, and has a master's degree in theology. She then began working for a more progressive church, and as a hospital chaplain. She also launched a podcast. Whaley legally changed her name in 2025.

Whaley ran to represent Michigan's 2nd House of Representatives district, which is based in the Downriver region, in the 2026 election. In April, one of her Democratic primary opponents, Frank Liberati, attempted to disqualify her from the race, as she was not running under her deadname, though the complaint was dismissed the county clerk's office in May. She successfully campaigned against the construction of an AI data center in Allen Park. She went on to win the primary on August 4. Whaley supported single-payer healthcare during her campaign. Endorsements of her campaign included Sarah McBride, the first openly transgender congresswoman, and Abdul El-Sayed. In the general election, she defeated Republican nominee Ron Kokinda with 63% of the vote. Whaley's victory was part of wave of Democratic victories all around the United States in the 2026 general election. Her victory made her Michigan's first openly transgender state legislator.
