= Luke Meerman =

American politician

Member of the Michigan House of Representatives
- Incumbent
- Assumed office January 1, 2019
- Preceded by: Roger Victory
- Succeeded by: Joe Moss (elect)
- Constituency: 88th district (2019–2022); 89th district (2023–present)

Personal details
- Born: c. 1975
- Party: Republican
- Spouse: Vicky
- Children: 5

Luke A. Meerman (born c. 1975) is an American politician who is a Republican member of the Michigan House of Representatives.

== Career ==
Meerman is fifth-generation farmer. During his 2018 run, Meerman was endorsed by AgriPac.

On October 10, 2021, Meerman co-sponsored a failed bill entitled House Bill 5444 also known as the "fetal heartbeat protection act."

Following redistricting, Meerman ran in the 89th district in 2022, winning reelection. He was reelected in 2024. He retired in 2026.

Political offices
Preceded by Roger Victory	Michigan Representatives; 88th District; 2019–present	Succeeded by Incumbent
