= Matt Schlinker =

American politician

Member-elect of the Michigan House of Representatives from the 68th district
- Assuming office January 1, 2027
- Succeeding: David Martin

Personal details
- Born: Flint, MI
- Party: Democratic
- Spouse: Sherry Schlinker
- Children: Jonathan Schlinker
- Education: Flint Northern High School
- Website: mattschlinker4rep.com

Matt Schlinker is an American politician who is the member-elect for the 68th district of the Michigan House of Representatives. He was elected at the 2026 election. He was a candidate in 2024. He is a retired General Motors worker from Flint, Michigan.
