= Melanie Macey =

American politician

Member-elect of the Michigan House of Representatives from the 6th district
- Assuming office January 1, 2027
- Succeeding: Natalie Price

Personal details
- Party: Democratic
- Education: University of Michigan
- Website: Campaign website

Melanie Macey is an American politician who is the member-elect for the 6th district of the Michigan House of Representatives. She was elected at the 2026 election. She was mayor pro tem of Royal Oak, Michigan.
