= Sherry Berecz =

American politician

Member-elect of the Michigan House of Representatives from the 28th district
- Assuming office January 1, 2027
- Succeeding: Jamie Thompson

Personal details
- Party: Democratic
- Website: Campaign website

Sherry A. Berecz is an American politician who is the member-elect for the 28th district of the Michigan House of Representatives. She was elected at the 2026 election. She was raised in Brownstown. She is a Brownstown Township Supervisor.
