= Lily Cheng-Schulting =

American politician

Member-elect of the Michigan House of Representatives from the 80th district
- Assuming office January 1, 2027
- Succeeding: Phil Skaggs

Personal details
- Party: Democratic
- Education: Syracuse University College of Law; University of California, Berkeley
- Website: Campaign website

Lily Cheng-Schulting is an American politician who is the member-elect for the 80th district of the Michigan House of Representatives.

== Biography ==
Cheng-Schulting is the daughter of Asian immigrants. She is a graduate of Syracuse University College of Law and University of California, Berkeley.

She is a disability advocate and founder and president of Disability A-TEAM of West Michigan. She supports term limits. She was elected to the Michigan Legislature at the 2026 election.
