= Helena Scott (politician) =

American politician (born 1961)

Member of the Michigan House of Representatives
- Incumbent
- Assumed office January 1, 2021
- Preceded by: LaTanya Garrett
- Constituency: 7th district (2021–2025); 8th district (2025–present)

Personal details
- Born: February 26, 1961 (age 65)
- Party: Democratic

Harriet Helena Scott (born February 26, 1961) is an American politician serving as a member of the Michigan House of Representatives since 2021, currently representing the 8th district. She is a member of the Democratic Party.

== Political career ==
Scott was elected to the 7th district in the 2020 Michigan House of Representatives election. She won reelection in 2022.

Following court-mandated redistricting of the Detroit area, Scott ran in the 8th district for the 2024 election, winning reelection.

In 2025, Scott ran for the Detroit City Council in District 2. She placed third with 25.44% of the vote in the nonpartisan blanket primary, behind incumbent councilwoman Angela Whitfield-Calloway's 44.39% and Roy McCalister, Jr.'s 29.79% of the vote, respectively.

Scott ran for reelection in 2026, but lost the Democratic primary to Chris Gilmer-Hill.
