= Joseph McClusky =

American politician

Member-elect of the Michigan House of Representatives from the 86th district
- Assuming office January 1, 2027
- Succeeding: Nancy De Boer

Personal details
- Party: Democratic
- Website: www.mccluskyformi.com

Joseph McClusky is an American politician who is the member-elect for the 86th district of the Michigan House of Representatives. He was elected at the 2026 election. He is from Holland, Michigan. He is LGBTQ.
