= Regina Ross =

Regina Ross may refer to:

- Regina Ross (politician)
- Regina Ross (American Horror Story)

== See also ==
- Regina Rossa
