= Gina Johnsen =

American politician

Member of the Michigan House of Representatives from the 78th district
- Incumbent
- Assumed office January 1, 2023
- Preceded by: Brad Paquette (redistricting)
- Succeeded by: Brandon Strong (elect)

Personal details
- Born: Lansing, Michigan
- Party: Republican
- Education: Wellesley College

Gina Johnsen is an American politician from Michigan who has represented the 78th district in the Michigan House of Representatives since the 2022 election. She was reelected in 2024. Johnsen is a business professional in the healthcare industry.

== See also ==
- Official website
- Campaign website
