= Ron Robinson (politician) =

American politician

Member of the Michigan House of Representatives from the 58th district
- Incumbent
- Assumed office January 1, 2025
- Preceded by: Nate Shannon
- Succeeded by: Katrina Manetta (elect)

Utica City Councilor
- In office January 1, 2023 – January 1, 2025

Personal details
- Born: Utica, Michigan, U.S.
- Party: Republican
- Spouse: Janice
- Education: Specs Howard School of Media Arts

Ron Robinson is an American businessman, veteran, and politician serving as a member of the Michigan House of Representatives since January 2025, representing the 58th district. A member of the Republican Party, Robinson previously served as a member of the Utica City Council from 2023 to 2025.

== Political career ==
Robinson was elected in 2025, defeating incumbent Nate Shannon. He is a veteran having served in the United States Marine Corps during the First Gulf War. He is also a small business owner running both a real estate company and a photography company and was a member of the Utica City Council.
