= Candace Calloway =

American politician

Member-elect of the Michigan House of Representatives from the 5th district
- Assuming office January 2027
- Succeeding: Regina Weiss

Personal details
- Party: Democratic

Candace Calloway is an American politician. A member of the Democratic Party, she is the member-elect for the 5th district of the Michigan House of Representatives.
