= Katrina Manetta =

American politician

Member-elect of the Michigan House of Representatives from the 58th district
- Assuming office January 2027
- Succeeding: Rob Robinson

Personal details
- Party: Democratic

Katrina Manetta is an American politician. A member of the Democratic Party, she is the member-elect for the 58th district of the Michigan House of Representatives.
