= Harold Pope (Michigan politician) =

American politician

Member-elect of the Michigan House of Representatives from the 74th district
- Assuming office January 1, 2027
- Succeeding: Kara Hope

Personal details
- Party: Democratic
- Website: Campaign website

Harold A. Pope is an American politician who is the member-elect for the 74th district of the Michigan House of Representatives. He was elected at the 2026 election. He was president of the NAACP in Lansing, Michigan.
