= Chris Gilmer-Hill =

American politician

Christopher Gilmer-Hill

Member-elect of the Michigan House of Representatives from the 8th district
- Assuming office January 1, 2027
- Succeeding: Helena Scott

Personal details
- Party: Democratic
- Other political affiliations: Democratic Socialists of America (Note: The Democratic Socialists of America (DSA) are not a registered political party. Instead, they are a political organization for those with democratic socialist ideologies.)
- Education: Harvard University (BA, MS)

Christopher Gilmer-Hill is an American politician and policy manager. A member of the Democratic Party, he is the member-elect for the 8th district in the Michigan House of Representatives. He is a member of the Democratic Socialists of America (DSA).

== Early life and education ==
Gilmer-Hill attended Detroit Country Day School. He then graduated from Harvard University, earning a Bachelor of Arts in neuroscience with a secondary focus on East Asian studies as well as a Master of Science. Upon graduating with his undergraduate degree in June 2022, Gilmer-Hill was one of three students to receive the Taliesin Prize in the Art of Learning.

== Political career ==
In 2024, Gilmer-Hill challenged incumbent Helena Scott in the Democratic primary election for the Michigan House of Representatives' 8th district. He was defeated by 44 points.

In 2026, Gilmer-Hill challenged Scott again. He was endorsed by the Detroit chapter of the Democratic Socialists of America and Working Families Party. Gilmer-Hill defeated Scott in an upset during the August 14th primary.

== Personal life ==
Gilmer-Hill is openly gay.
