= Phil Skaggs =

American politician

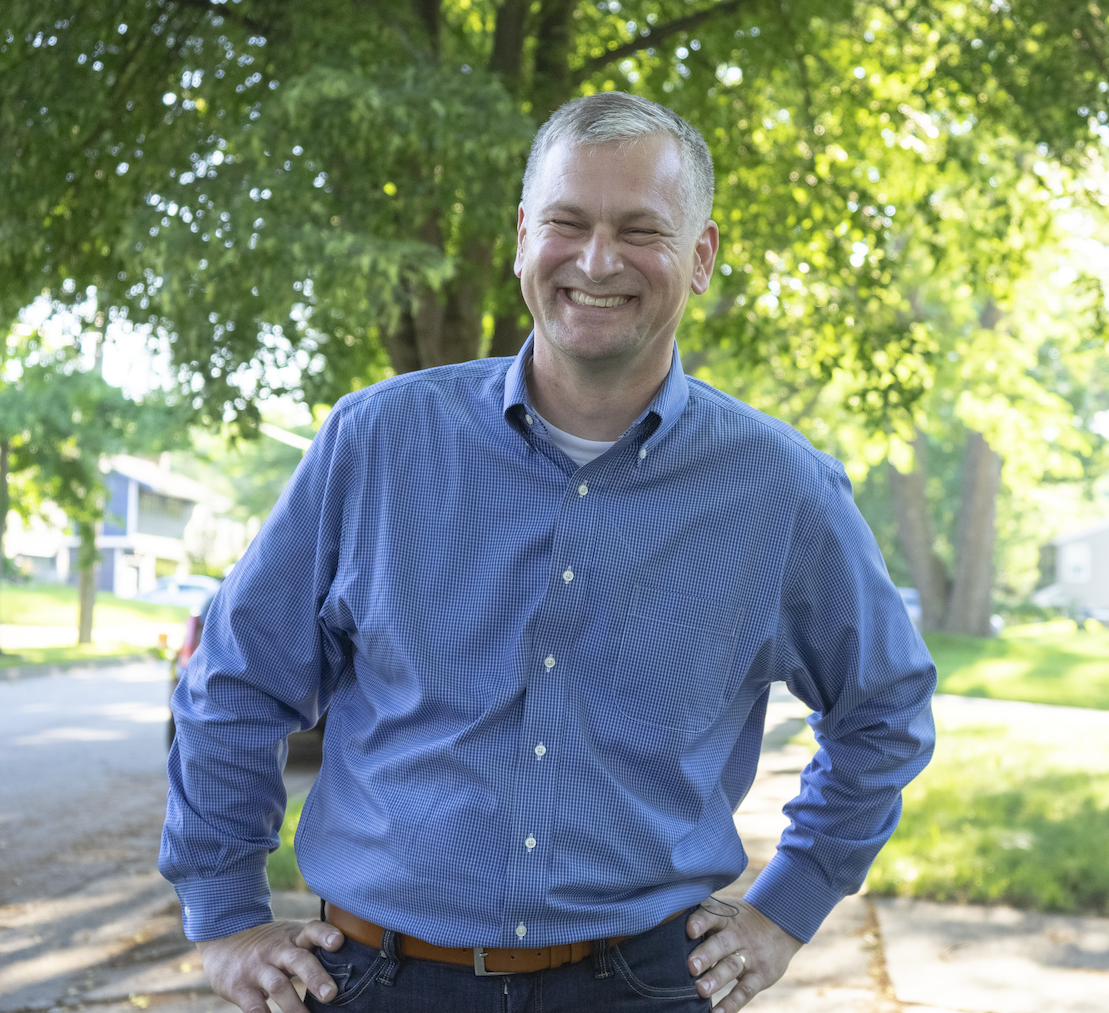
- Phil Skaggs in 2021

Member of the Michigan House of Representatives from the 80th district
- Incumbent
- Assumed office January 1, 2023
- Preceded by: Mary Whiteford
- Succeeded by: Lily Cheng-Schulting (elect)

Personal details
- Born: Philip C. Skaggs; May 1, 1968 (age 58) Grand Rapids, Michigan, US
- Party: Democratic
- Education: University of Michigan (BA, MA)
- Website: https://philskaggs.com

Philip Skaggs (born May 1, 1968) is an American politician who serves as the State Representative for Michigan's 80th House District in the Michigan House of Representatives. The 80th District includes the city of East Grand Rapids, Michigan, city of Kentwood, Michigan, portion of the city of Grand Rapids, Michigan, a portion of Grand Rapids Township, Michigan and Cascade Township, Michigan. He was elected to the Michigan House of Representatives in the newly drawn 80th district in the 2022 Michigan House of Representatives election. He was reelected in 2024.

== Early life and education ==
Skaggs is a graduate of the University of Michigan, where he received a Bachelor of Arts degree in History in 1990 and a Master of Arts degree in History in 1994.. After graduation, Skaggs worked as a professor of history and then as a legislative and campaign staffer. Before his election to the State House, Skaggs was a Kent County Commissioner (2017–2021) and an East Grand Rapids City Commissioner (2012–2016).

== State representative ==
Skaggs serves as a member of the House Appropriations Committee and as the Chair of the Appropriations Subcommittee on Licensing and Regulatory Affairs and Department of Insurance and Financial Services. Skaggs has introduced legislation to prohibit assault weapons from being openly carried within 1000 feet of government buildings, establish a statewide septic inspection code, and requiring oral health screenings to enter kindergarten. In 2023 he proposed changing the state flag, citing that the Michigan flag is similar to many other states in that it is merely the Michigan state seal on a blue flag.
