= Jamie Thompson (politician) =

American politician from Michigan

Member of the Michigan House of Representatives from the 28th district
- Incumbent
- Assumed office January 1, 2023
- Preceded by: Lori Stone (redistricting)
- Succeeded by: Sherry Berecz (elect)

Personal details
- Born: Dearborn, Michigan
- Party: Republican
- Education: Detroit Business Institute

Jamie Thompson is an American nurse and politician serving as a member of the Michigan House of Representatives since 2023, representing the 28th district. A Mississauga Ojibwe citizen of the Hiawatha First Nation and member of the Republican Party, Thompson hails from Brownstown Charter Township and is a licensed practical nurse. In 2025, Thompson's campaign payments of more than $24,000 to her son, Jackson, were criticized. She was also a part of a feud with Republican state lawmaker James DeSana, with Thompson at one point refusing to show up to House session as a result.

She lost her re-election campaign in 2026 to Sherry Berecz, the Supervisor of Brownstown Township which is located in the house district.

== See also ==
- List of Native American politicians
- Native American women in politics

== See also ==
- Official website
- Campaign website
