= Ottawa Impact =

Conservative advocacy organization

- Formation: 2021; 5 years ago
- Founders: Joe Moss and Sylvia Rhodea
- Type: Not-for-Profit; Political Action Committee
- Location: Ottawa County, Michigan
- Region served: United States
- Website: ottawaimpact.com

Ottawa Impact is a Conservative advocacy organization and political action committee formed in 2021, aimed at influencing conservative politics in and around Ottawa County, Michigan. The group was founded by Joe Moss and Sylvia Rhodea, who both currently serve on the Ottawa County Board of Commissioners.

The group consists of a 501(c)(4) non-profit organization, two PACs, and a legal defense fund. Ottawa Impact primarily targets local races, having run candidates for the Board of Commissioners and local school boards in the county. In addition to electoral politics, the organization has also backed various lawsuits and petitions aimed at furthering their beliefs.

Ottawa Impact has garnered national attention for their controversial form of governance on the Ottawa County board of commissioners and their influence over the Michigan Republican Party.

== Ideology ==
According to the group's website they "recognize our nation’s Judeo-Christian heritage and celebrate America as an exceptional nation blessed by God."

In addition to their Christian themes, Ottawa Impact had also advocated for vaccine skepticism, gun rights, The group has also recently appeared with Christian nationalist militia activists to endorse a "Doctrine of Lesser Magistrates" stating that counties should have the power to nullify state laws if they impose on Christians.

== History ==
During the COVID-19 pandemic the Ottawa County Health Department closed multiple schools, including private religious institutions, in an attempt to slow the spread of the virus. Christian activists responded by drafting a resolution calling on the Ottawa County Board of Commissioners to end enforcement of all pandemic health measures. The chair of the board declined to adopt the resolution, stating that "commissioners cannot control local health departments". The activists, led by Joe Moss, responded by formally organizing into Ottawa Impact in early 2021.

Ottawa Impact continued to advocate against public health measures. The group rallied and petitioned throughout 2021. These actions culminated in an unsuccessful lawsuit against the county health department. As frustration grew with the county's refusal to adopt their policies, the group announced that they would oust those who "fail to defend people's rights".

Ottawa Impact then ran numerous candidates for local office in the 2022 United States elections, eventually gaining 7 out of 11 seats on the Ottawa County Board of Commissioners.

== Influence ==
Following the 2022 United States elections, Ottawa Impact gained significant influence over West Michigan politics. Members of the group held a majority on the Ottawa County Board of Commissioners from 2023 to 2024. Several appointed members of the county government, including administrator John Gibbs, are affiliated with Ottawa Impact. In addition to this, Ottawa Impact also has ties with school board members throughout Ottawa County, Allegan County, and Kent County.

Ottawa Impact also influences statewide Republican politics in Michigan, with the group successfully backing Kristina Karamo for chair of the Michigan Republican Party. Karamo was introduced at the party chair convention by Ottawa Impact founder, Joe Moss.

An article on Simply American, a news site founded by Joe Moss and affiliated with Ottawa Impact, states that "some of the present (unnamed) commissioners plan to go on to bigger and better things" after their two-year term expires.
