= Carol Glanville =

American politician

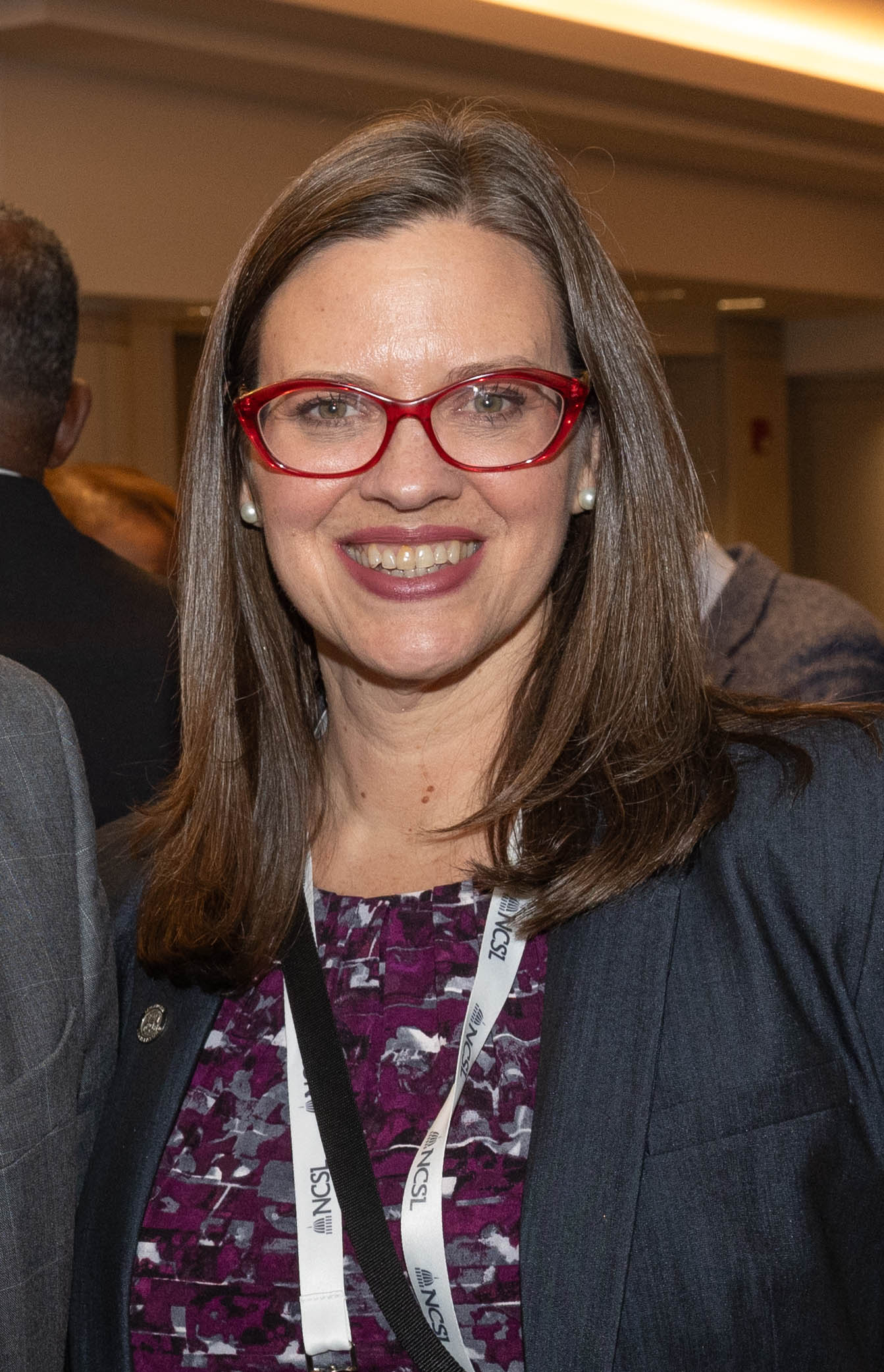

Member of the Michigan House of Representatives
- Incumbent
- Assumed office May 13, 2022
- Preceded by: Mark Huizenga
- Succeeded by: Khristian Silvis (elect)
- Constituency: 74th district (2022); 84th district (2023–present)

Personal details
- Born: Michigan, U.S.
- Party: Democratic
- Education: Western Michigan University (BA); University of Phoenix (MA)

Carol Glanville is an American politician who has served in the Michigan House of Representatives since May 2022 after winning a special election. She represents the 84th district, which covers part of Kent County. Glanville served on the Walker City Commission from 2019 until her election to the legislature. In September 2025, she declared her candidacy for Michigan's 30th Senate district in the 2026 election.

== Early life and education ==
Glanville was born and raised in Michigan. She earned a Bachelor of Arts degree in Spanish and translation from Western Michigan University and a Master of Arts in Education in curriculum and technology from the University of Phoenix.

== Career ==
Outside of politics, Glanville works as a program manager at the Dorothy A. Johnson Center for Philanthropy.

On January 7, 2019, Glanville was one of four candidates considered by the City Commission of Walker, Michigan, to fill a vacancy in the city's second electoral ward. Glanville was unanimously selected by the six commissioners to fill the vacancy, and she was sworn in on January 14. On November 3, 2020, Glanville was elected to a full term on the Commission, winning 55% of the vote.

=== Michigan House of Representatives ===
A Democrat, Glanville's victory over Republican candidate Robert Regan was considered an upset, as the 74th House district in northwest Kent County was typically a Republican stronghold. It had voted for Trump by 16 points in 2020. Glanville won the seat, which had been in Republican hands since 1993, by 52%-40%.

Glanville's surprise victory has been attributed to a series of controversial comments made by her opponent, Regan, who said that he told his daughters "if rape is inevitable, lie back and enjoy it." He also spread conspiracy theories on the 2022 Russian invasion of Ukraine, called COVID-19 a "fake pandemic," and shared an opinion that "feminism...is a Jewish program to degrade and subjugate white men.”

Glanville's House term expired on December 31, 2022. She was elected to a full term in the newly-drawn, significantly more compact and Democratic-leaning 84th district, covering Walker, Grandville and part of northwest Grand Rapids, in the 2022 election. She was reelected in 2024.

In the 2026 state senate election, Granville is facing incumbent Republican and fellow Walker resident Mark Huizenga, her predecessor in the state house.
