= Mark Tisdel =

American politician and member of Michigan House of Representatives

Member of the Michigan House of Representatives
- Incumbent
- Assumed office January 1, 2021
- Preceded by: Michael Webber
- Constituency: 45th district (2021–2022); 55th district (2023–present)

Personal details
- Party: Republican
- Website: Official website

Mark Tisdel (born September 21, 1955) is an American politician serving as a member of the Michigan House of Representatives since 2021, currently representing the 55th district. He is a member of the Republican Party.

== Career ==
For 22 years, Tisdel worked as principal with Backus Payne & Associates, specializing in medical-liability insurance.

== Political career ==
Prior to his service in the Legislature, Tisdel served on the Rochester Hills City Council for eight years — four of those years as council president.

He was elected to the Michigan House of Representatives from the 45th district in 2020.

For the 2022 election cycle, he was redistricted into 55th district where he won a second term in office. He was reelected in 2024.

Tisdel has been an active advocate for bipartisan legislation during his tenure in the Michigan House of Representatives. Several of his bipartisan bills have been enacted into law. Notably, he was instrumental in passing legislation aimed at protecting online shoppers from fraud. As the Majority Vice Chair of the House Tax Policy Committee, Tisdel sponsored successful initiatives to provide tax relief for small businesses and streamline tax collection processes.

In 2021, Tisdel played a key role in securing state funding for Innovation Hills, an inclusive, all-abilities park in Rochester Hills. Additionally, he has introduced bipartisan proposals to promote gun safety and end the revolving door within Michigan's state government.

== Recognition ==
Tisdel has been recognized as Legislator of the Year on four occasions during his tenure. He received this honor from the Michigan Restaurant and Lodging Association in 2021, the Small Business Association of Michigan in 2022, the Michigan Retailers Association in 2023, and the Michigan Municipal League in 2024.
