= 2014 Michigan House of Representatives election =

- November 4, 2014

All 110 seats in the Michigan House of Representatives 56 seats needed for a majority
- Turnout: 2,984,320 (40.07%)
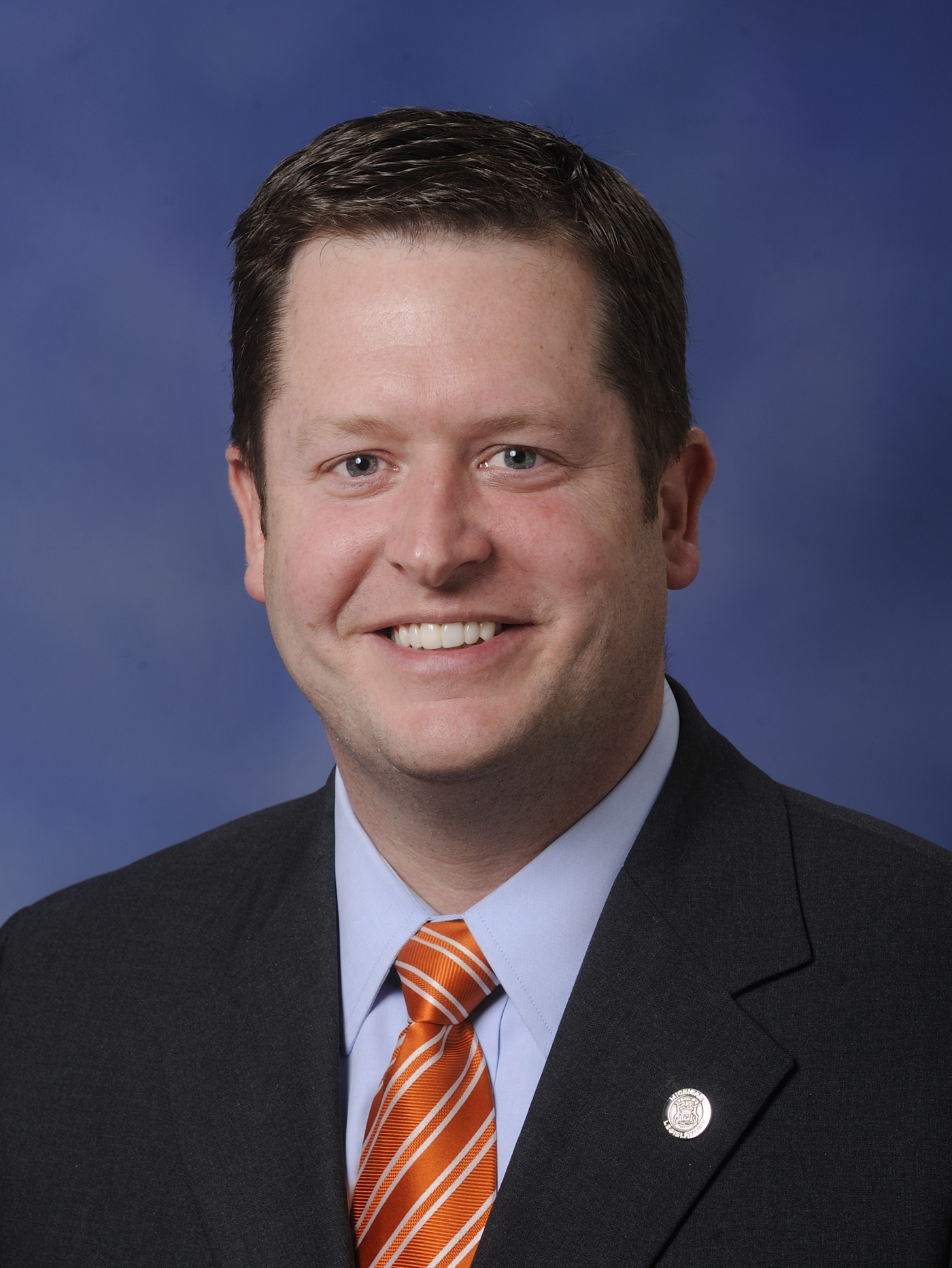

	Majority party	Minority party
Leader	Jase Bolger (Term limited)	Tim Greimel
Party	Republican	Democratic
Leader since	January 12, 2011	January 9, 2013
Leader's seat	63rd District	29th District
Last election	59	51
Seats after	63	47
Seat change	▲4	▼4
Popular vote	1,457,867	1,526,453
Percentage	48.85%	51.15%
- Republican gain Democratic hold Republican hold Republican: 40–50% 50–60% 60–70% 70–80% Democratic: 50–60% 60–70% 70–80% 80–90% >90%
Speaker before election
Jase Bolger
Republican
Elected Speaker
Kevin Cotter
Republican

The 2014 Michigan House of Representatives elections were held on November 4, 2014, with partisan primaries to select the parties' nominees in the various districts on August 5, 2014. Members elected at the 2014 election served in the 98th Michigan Legislature, which convened on January 7, 2015.

== Term-limited members ==
Under the Michigan Constitution, members of the state Senate are only able to serve two four-years terms, and members of the House of Representatives are limited to three two-years terms. The following members were term-limited from seeking re-election to the House in 2014.

=== Democrats (12) ===
- 5th District: Fred Durhal, Jr. (Detroit)
- 6th District: Rashida Tlaib (Detroit)
- 8th District: David Nathan (Detroit)
- 12th District: Douglas Geiss (Taylor)
- 13th District: Andrew Kandrevas (Southgate)
- 21st District: Dian Slavens (Canton)
- 22nd District: Harold Haugh (Roseville)
- 27th District: Ellen Cogen Lipton (Huntington Woods)
- 34th District: Woodrow Stanley (Flint)
- 37th District: Vicki Barnett (Farmington Hills)
- 62nd District: Kate Segal (Battle Creek)
- 84th District: Terry Brown (Pigeon)

=== Republicans (14) ===
- 19th District: John J. Walsh (Livonia)
- 36th District: Pete Lund (Shelby Township)
- 38th District: Hugh Crawford (Novi)
- 42nd District: Bill Rogers (Brighton)
- 43rd District: Gail Haines (Waterford)
- 44th District: Eileen Kowall (White Lake)
- 45th District: Tom McMillin (Rochester Hills)
- 47th District: Cindy Denby (Handy Township)
- 58th District: Kenneth Kurtz (Coldwater)
- 59th District: Matt Lori (Constantine)
- 63rd District: James "Jase" Bolger (Marshall)
- 80th District: Robert Genetski (Saugatuck)
- 82nd District: Kevin Daley (Lum)
- 90th District: Joseph Haveman (Holland)
- 98th District: Jim Stamas (Midland)
- 104th District: Wayne Schmidt (Traverse City)

== Predictions ==
Source	Ranking	As of
Governing	Lean R	October 20, 2014

== Results ==
The election resulted in Republicans gaining four seats, and Democrats losing four seats.

On November 6, Kevin Cotter, Republican from the 99th District, was elected Speaker of the House, Tom Leonard, Republican from the 93rd District, was elected Speaker pro tempore, and Tim Greimel, Democrat from the 29th District, was re-elected Minority Leader.

=== Districts 1–28 ===
1st District (Wayne (Harper Woods, Grosse Pointe Woods, Grosse Pointe Township, far northeast Detroit))
Party	Candidate	Votes	%
Democratic	Brian Banks (incumbent)	15,992	67.27
Republican	John Hauler	7,782	32.73
Total votes		23,774	100.0
Democratic hold			

2nd District (Wayne (southeast Detroit, Grosse Pointe, Grosse Pointe Park, Grosse Pointe Farms))
Party	Candidate	Votes	%
Democratic	Alberta Tinsley-Talabi (incumbent)	17,385	69.40
Republican	Daniel Lamar	7,664	30.60
Total votes		25,049	100.0
Democratic hold			

3rd District (Wayne (north central Detroit))
Party	Candidate	Votes	%
Democratic	Wendell Byrd	19,313	97.08
Republican	Dolores Brodersen	581	2.92
Total votes		19,894	100.0
Democratic hold			

4th District (Wayne (central Detroit, Hamtramck))
Party	Candidate	Votes	%
Democratic	Rose Mary Robinson (incumbent)	15,609	94.57
Republican	Edith Floyd	896	5.43
Total votes		16,505	100.0
Democratic hold			

5th District (Wayne (southwest Detroit))
Party	Candidate	Votes	%
Democratic	Fred Durhal III	11,795	94.82
Republican	Dorothy Patterson	645	5.18
Total votes		12,440	100.0
Democratic hold			

6th District (Wayne (southwest Detroit, downtown Detroit, near eastside of Detroit, Ecorse, River Rouge))
Party	Candidate	Votes	%
Democratic	Stephanie Chang	17,930	93.98
Republican	Tairia Bridges	1,149	6.02
Total votes		19,079	100.0
Democratic hold			

7th District (Wayne (north-central Detroit, Highland Park))
Party	Candidate	Votes	%
Democratic	LaTanya Garrett	22,207	97.81
Republican	David Bradley	497	2.19
Total votes		22,704	100.0
Democratic hold			

8th District (Wayne (northwest Detroit))
Party	Candidate	Votes	%
Democratic	Sherry Gay-Dagnogo	23,016	96.76
Republican	Christopher Ewald	770	3.24
Total votes		23,786	100.0
Democratic hold			

9th District (Wayne (west Detroit, Dearborn (part)))
Party	Candidate	Votes	%
Democratic	Harvey Santana (incumbent)	17,623	95.52
Republican	James Stephens	827	4.48
Total votes		18,450	100.0
Democratic hold			

10th District (Wayne (far northwest Detroit, Redford Township))
Party	Candidate	Votes	%
Democratic	Leslie Love	21,606	82.26
Republican	Matthew Hauser	4,658	17.74
Total votes		26,264	100.0
Democratic hold			

11th District (Wayne (Garden City, Inkster, Dearborn Heights (part), Livonia (part), Westland (part))
Party	Candidate	Votes	%
Democratic	Julie Plawecki	15,160	70.49
Republican	Jim Rhoades	6,346	29.51
Total votes		21,506	100.0
Democratic hold			

12th District (Wayne (Romulus, Taylor, Van Buren Township (part))
Party	Candidate	Votes	%
Democratic	Erika Geiss	15,334	69.61
Republican	Kelly Thompson	6,696	30.39
Total votes		22,030	100.0
Democratic hold			

13th District (Wayne (Allen Park, Southgate, Dearborn Heights (part))
Party	Candidate	Votes	%
Democratic	Frank Liberati	15,282	61.02
Republican	Harry Sawicki	9,762	38.98
Total votes		25,044	100.0
Democratic hold			

14th District (Wayne (Lincoln Park, Melvindale, Riverview, Wyandotte))
Party	Candidate	Votes	%
Democratic	Paul Clemente (incumbent)	14,661	70.20
Republican	Nathan Inks	6,223	29.80
Total votes		20,884	100.0
Democratic hold			

15th District (Wayne (Dearborn—excluding northeast portions))
Party	Candidate	Votes	%
Democratic	George Darany (incumbent)	15,009	67.53
Republican	Johnnie Salemassi	7,216	32.47
Total votes		22,225	100.0
Democratic hold			

16th District (Wayne (Wayne, Westland (all but northeast corner))
Party	Candidate	Votes	%
Democratic	Robert Kosowski (incumbent)	15,346	68.19
Republican	Steve Boron	7,160	31.81
Total votes		22,506	100.0
Democratic hold			

17th District (Monroe (Monroe, Ash Township, Berlin Township, Exeter Township, Frenchtown Township, London Township), Wayne (Flat Rock, Rockwood, Sumpter Township))
Party	Candidate	Votes	%
Democratic	Bill LaVoy (incumbent)	14,623	59.62
Republican	Charles Londo	9,903	40.38
Total votes		24,526	100.0
Democratic hold			

18th District (Macomb (Eastpointe, St. Clair Shores))
Party	Candidate	Votes	%
Democratic	Sarah Roberts (incumbent)	18,853	62.06
Republican	Roland Fraschetti	11,524	37.94
Total votes		30,377	100.0
Democratic hold			

19th District (Wayne (Livonia, excluding southeast tip))
Party	Candidate	Votes	%
Republican	Laura Cox	21,614	61.77
Democratic	Stacey Dogonski	13,377	38.23
Total votes		34,991	100.0
Republican hold			

20th District (Wayne (Northville -- portion within county, Northville Township, Plymouth, Plymouth Township, east Canton Township))
Party	Candidate	Votes	%
Republican	Kurt Heise (incumbent)	18,127	60.09
Democratic	Nate Smith-Tyge	12,037	39.91
Total votes		30,164	100.0
Republican hold			

21st District (Wayne (Belleville, Van Buren Township -- excluding northeast portion, Canton Township -- excluding eastern portion))
Party	Candidate	Votes	%
Democratic	Kristy Pagan	15,796	54.95
Republican	Carol Fausone	12,951	45.05
Total votes		28,747	100.0
Democratic hold			

22nd District (Macomb (Roseville, Warren -- eastern portion))
Party	Candidate	Votes	%
Democratic	John Chirkun	13,461	63.96
Republican	Jeff Bonnell	6,704	31.85
U.S. Taxpayers'	Les Townsend	882	4.19
Total votes		21,047	100.0
Democratic hold			

23rd District (Wayne (Brownstown Township, Gibraltar, Grosse Ile Township, Huron Township, Trenton, Woodhaven))
Party	Candidate	Votes	%
Republican	Pat Somerville (incumbent)	16,060	52.12
Democratic	David Haener	14,754	47.88
Total votes		30,814	100.0
Republican hold			

24th District (Macomb (Harrison Township, northern Clinton Township, southwest Macomb Township))
Party	Candidate	Votes	%
Republican	Anthony Forlini (incumbent)	16,358	58.54
Democratic	Philip Kurczewski	10,893	38.99
U.S. Taxpayers'	Daryl Smith	690	2.47
Total votes		27,941	100.0
Republican hold			

25th District (Macomb (east Sterling Heights, northeast Warren))
Party	Candidate	Votes	%
Democratic	Henry Yanez (incumbent)	14,970	53.48
Republican	Nick Hawatmeh	13,024	46.52
Total votes		27,994	100.0
Democratic hold			

26th District (Oakland (Madison Heights, Royal Oak))
Party	Candidate	Votes	%
Democratic	Jim Townsend (incumbent)	17,751	60.94
Republican	Greg Dildilian	11,377	39.06
Total votes		29,128	100.0
Democratic hold			

27th District (Oakland (Berkley, Ferndale, Hazel Park, Huntington Woods, Oak Park, Pleasant Ridge, Royal Oak Township))
Party	Candidate	Votes	%
Democratic	Robert Wittenberg	23,756	75.59
Republican	Michael Ryan	7,672	24.41
Total votes		31,428	100.0
Democratic hold			

28th District (Macomb (west and central Warren, Center Line))
Party	Candidate	Votes	%
Democratic	Derek E. Miller	13,362	64.29
Republican	Beth Foster	7,423	35.71
Total votes		20,785	100.0
Democratic hold			

=== Districts 29–55 ===
29th District (Oakland (Auburn Hills, Pontiac, Keego Harbor, Sylvan Lake, Orchard Lake))
Party	Candidate	Votes	%
Democratic	Tim Greimel (incumbent)	15,042	73.66
Republican	David Lonier	5,380	26.34
Total votes		20,422	100.0
Democratic hold			

30th District (Macomb (west Sterling Heights, Utica, southeast Shelby Township))
Party	Candidate	Votes	%
Republican	Jeff Farrington (incumbent)	12,654	54.76
Democratic	Bo Karpinsky	10,455	45.24
Total votes		23,109	100.0
Republican hold			

31st District (Macomb (south Clinton Township, Fraser, Mount Clemens))
Party	Candidate	Votes	%
Democratic	Marilyn Lane (incumbent)	15,769	61.07
Republican	Phil Rode	10,054	38.93
Total votes		25,823	100.0
Democratic hold			

32nd District (Macomb (Chesterfield Township, New Baltimore), St. Clair (Casco Township, Columbus Township, Ira Township, Kenockee Township, Kimball Township, Riley Township, Wales Township))
Party	Candidate	Votes	%
Republican	Andrea LaFontaine (incumbent)	16,218	62.07
Democratic	Pamela Kraft	9,911	37.93
Total votes		26,129	100.0
Republican hold			

33rd District (Macomb (Armada Township, Lenox Township, Macomb Township -- all but southwest portion, Ray Township, Richmond -- portion within county, Memphis -- portion within county))
Party	Candidate	Votes	%
Republican	Ken Goike (incumbent)	18,148	65.88
Democratic	Joe Ruffin	9,398	34.12
Total votes		27,546	100.0
Republican hold			

34th District (Genesee (Flint -- excluding southeast and central portions))
Party	Candidate	Votes	%
Democratic	Sheldon Neeley	17,129	91.11
Republican	Bruce Rogers	1,671	8.89
Total votes		18,800	100.0
Democratic hold			

35th District (Oakland (Lathrup Village, Southfield, Southfield Township))
Party	Candidate	Votes	%
Democratic	Jeremy Moss	31,659	83.02
Republican	Robert Brim	6,473	16.98
Total votes		38,132	100.0
Democratic hold			

36th District (Macomb (Bruce Township, Shelby Township -- excluding southeast portion, Washington Township))
Party	Candidate	Votes	%
Republican	Peter Lucido	20,845	69.93
Democratic	Robert Murphy	8,965	30.07
Total votes		29,810	100.0
Republican hold			

37th District (Oakland (Farmington, Farmington Hills))
Party	Candidate	Votes	%
Democratic	Christine Greig	19,148	57.15
Republican	Richard Lerner	14,359	42.85
Total votes		33,507	100.0
Democratic hold			

38th District (Oakland (Lyon Township, Northville-portion within county, Novi, Novi Township, South Lyon, Walled Lake))
Party	Candidate	Votes	%
Republican	Kathy Crawford	19,232	62.57
Democratic	Jasper Catanzaro	11,507	37.43
Total votes		30,739	100.0
Republican hold			

39th District (Oakland (Commerce Township, western West Bloomfield Township, Wixom))
Party	Candidate	Votes	%
Republican	Klint Kesto (incumbent)	16,741	52.25
Democratic	Sandy Colvin	15,299	47.75
Total votes		32,040	100.0
Republican hold			

40th District (Oakland (Birmingham, Bloomfield Hills, Bloomfield Township, eastern West Bloomfield Township))
Party	Candidate	Votes	%
Republican	Michael McCready (incumbent)	23,678	57.63
Democratic	Mary Belden	17,408	42.37
Total votes		41,086	100.0
Republican hold			

41st District (Oakland (Clawson, Troy))
Party	Candidate	Votes	%
Republican	Martin Howrylak (incumbent)	18,356	55.77
Democratic	Mary Kerwin	14,555	44.23
Total votes		32,911	100.0
Republican hold			

42nd District (Livingston (Brighton, Brighton Township, Genoa Township, Green Oak Township, Hamburg Township, Putnam Township))
Party	Candidate	Votes	%
Republican	Lana Theis	23,477	65.18
Democratic	Timothy Johnson	12,544	34.82
Total votes		36,021	100.0
Republican hold			

43rd District (Oakland (Clarkston, Lake Angelus, Independence Township, Waterford Township -- excluding southwest portion))
Party	Candidate	Votes	%
Republican	Jim Tedder	18,661	58.24
Democratic	Dennis Ritter	13,380	41.76
Total votes		32,041	100.0
Republican hold			

44th District (Oakland (Highland Township, Milford Township, Springfield Township, southwest Waterford Township, White Lake Township))
Party	Candidate	Votes	%
Republican	Jim Runestad	21,840	67.83
Democratic	Mark Venie	10,359	32.17
Total votes		32,199	100.0
Republican hold			

45th District (Oakland (southwest Oakland Township, Rochester Hills, Rochester))
Party	Candidate	Votes	%
Republican	Michael Webber	18,370	56.16
Democratic	Joanna VanRaaphorst	14,338	43.84
Total votes		32,708	100.0
Republican hold			

46th District (Oakland (Addison Township, Brandon Township, Oakland Township -- all but southwest portion, Orion Township, Oxford Township))
Party	Candidate	Votes	%
Republican	Bradford Jacobsen (incumbent)	21,513	69.15
Democratic	David Lillis	9,597	30.85
Total votes		31,110	100.0
Republican hold			

47th District (Livingston (Cohoctah Township, Conway Township, Deerfield Township, Handy Township, Hartland Township, Howell, Howell Township, Iosco Township, Marion Township, Tyrone Township, Unadilla Township))
Party	Candidate	Votes	%
Republican	Henry Vaupel	20,995	69.11
Democratic	Jordan Genso	8,086	26.62
Libertarian	Rodger Young	1,300	4.28
Total votes		30,381	100.0
Republican hold			

48th District (Genesee (Clio, Davison, Davison Township, Forest Township, Genesee Township, Montrose, Montrose Township, Richfield Township, Thetford Township, Vienna Township))
Party	Candidate	Votes	%
Democratic	Pam Faris (incumbent)	17,628	62.33
Republican	Stephanie Stikovich	10,652	37.67
Total votes		28,280	100.0
Democratic hold			

49th District (Genesee (southwest Flint, Flint Township, Flushing, Mount Morris, Mount Morris Township, Swartz Creek))
Party	Candidate	Votes	%
Democratic	Phil Phelps (incumbent)	18,211	73.63
Republican	Lu Penton	6,522	26.37
Total votes		24,733	100.0
Democratic hold			

50th District (Genesee (Burton, Grand Blanc, Grand Blanc Township, Mundy Township))
Party	Candidate	Votes	%
Democratic	Charles Smiley (incumbent)	17,018	58.74
Republican	Craig Withers	11,952	41.26
Total votes		28,970	100.0
Democratic hold			

51st District (Genesee (Argentine Township, Atlas Township, Clayton Township, Fenton, Fenton Township, Flushing Township, Gaines Township, Linden), Oakland (Groveland Township, Holly Township, Rose Township))
Party	Candidate	Votes	%
Republican	Joseph Graves (incumbent)	19,433	57.93
Democratic	Ken Thomas	14,115	42.07
Total votes		33,548	100.0
Republican hold			

52nd District (Washtenaw (Bridgewater Township, Chelsea, Dexter Township, Freedom Township, Lima Township, Lodi Township, Lyndon Township, Manchester Township, Northfield Township, Salem Township, Saline, Saline Township, Scio Township, Sharon Township, Sylvan Township
Party	Candidate	Votes	%
Democratic	Gretchen Driskell (incumbent)	20,844	56.17
Republican	John Hochstetler	16,263	43.83
Total votes		37,107	100.0
Democratic hold			

53rd District (Washtenaw (south Ann Arbor))
Party	Candidate	Votes	%
Democratic	Jeff Irwin (incumbent)	20,997	82.34
Republican	John Spisak	4,504	17.66
Total votes		25,501	100.0
Democratic hold			

54th District (Washtenaw (Superior Township, Ypsilanti, Ypsilanti Township))
Party	Candidate	Votes	%
Democratic	David Rutledge (incumbent)	18,608	75.33
Republican	Ed Moore	6,093	24.67
Total votes		24,701	100.0
Democratic hold			

55th District (Washtenaw (north Ann Arbor, Ann Arbor Township, Augusta Township, Milan -- portion within county, Pittsfield Township, York Township))
Party	Candidate	Votes	%
Democratic	Adam Zemke (incumbent)	19,085	67.88
Republican	Leonard Burk	9,030	32.12
Total votes		28,115	100.0
Democratic hold			

=== Districts 56–83 ===
56th District (Monroe (Bedford Township, Berlin Township, Dundee Township, Erie Township, Ida Township, LaSalle Township, London Township, Luna Pier, Milan -- portion within county, Milan Township, Monroe Township, Petersberg, Raisinville Township, Summerfield Township
Party	Candidate	Votes	%
Republican	Jason Sheppard	13,600	50.33
Democratic	Tom Redmond	12,726	47.09
U.S. Taxpayers'	Al Bain	697	2.58
Total votes		27,023	100.0
Republican hold			

57th District (Lenawee (excluding Cambridge Township))
Party	Candidate	Votes	%
Republican	Nancy Jenkins (incumbent)	15,421	58.52
Democratic	Sharon Wimple	10,932	41.48
Total votes		26,353	100.0
Republican hold			

58th District (Branch, Hillsdale)
Party	Candidate	Votes	%
Republican	Eric Leutheuser	17,010	71.49
Democratic	Amaryllis Thomas	6,783	28.51
Total votes		23,793	100.0
Republican hold			

59th District (Cass (excluding Howard Township, Milton Township, Niles, Ontwa Township, Silver Creek Township), St. Joseph)
Party	Candidate	Votes	%
Republican	Aaron Miller	14,141	62.25
Democratic	Mike Moroz	8,574	37.75
Total votes		22,715	100.0
Republican hold			

60th District (Kalamazoo (Kalamazoo, Kalamazoo Township -- most))
Party	Candidate	Votes	%
Democratic	Jon Hoadley	15,514	70.12
Republican	Michael Perrin	6,611	29.88
Total votes		22,125	100.0
Democratic hold			

61st District (Kalamazoo (Alamo Township, north Kalamazoo Township, Oshtemo Township, Parchment, Portage, Prairie Ronde Township, Texas Township))
Party	Candidate	Votes	%
Republican	Brandt Iden	16,015	48.38
Democratic	John Fischer	14,145	42.73
Libertarian	Michael Stampfler	2,941	8.88
Total votes		33,101	100.0
Republican hold			

62nd District (Calhoun (Albion, Albion Township, Battle Creek, Bedford Township, Clarence Township, Convis Township, Lee Township, Pennfield Township, Sheridan Township, Springfield))
Party	Candidate	Votes	%
Republican	John Bizon	11,875	51.18
Democratic	Andy Helmboldt	11,328	48.82
Total votes		23,203	100.0
Republican gain from Democratic			

63rd District (Calhoun (Athens Township, Burlington Township, Clarendon Township, Eckford Township, Emmet Township, Fredonia Township, Homer Township, Leroy Township, Marengo Township, Marshall, Marshall Township, Newton Township, Tekonsha Township), Kalamazoo (Brady T
Party	Candidate	Votes	%
Republican	David Maturen	16,718	56.21
Democratic	Bill Farmer	13,023	43.79
Total votes		29,741	100.0
Republican hold			

64th District (Jackson (Concord Township, Hanover Township, Jackson, Napoleon Township, Parma Township, Pulaski Township, Sandstone Township, Spring Arbor Township, Summit Township))
Party	Candidate	Votes	%
Republican	Earl Poleski (incumbent)	13,617	61.11
Democratic	Brenda Pilgrim	8,666	38.89
Total votes		22,283	100.0
Republican hold			

65th District (Eaton (Brookfield Township, Eaton Township, Eaton Rapids, Hamlin Township), Jackson (Blackman Township, Columbia Township, Grass Lake Township, Henrietta Township, Leoni Township, Liberty Township, Norvell Township, Rives Township, Springport Township, T
Party	Candidate	Votes	%
Republican	Brett Roberts	15,955	56.98
Democratic	Bonnie Johnson	11,077	39.56
Libertarian	Ronald Muszynski	971	3.47
Total votes		28,003	100.0
Republican hold			

66th District (Van Buren, Kalamazoo (Alamo Township, Cooper Township, Parchment))
Party	Candidate	Votes	%
Republican	Aric Nesbitt (incumbent)	15,753	57.49
Democratic	Annie Brown	11,646	42.51
Total votes		27,399	100.0
Republican hold			

67th District (Ingham (Alaiedon Township, Aurelius Township, Bunker Hill Township, Delhi Township, Ingham Township, central and southeast Lansing, Leroy Township, Leslie, Leslie Township, Mason, Onondaga Township, Stockbridge Township, Vevay Township, Wheatfield Townsh
Party	Candidate	Votes	%
Democratic	Tom Cochran (incumbent)	16,975	54.31
Republican	John Hayhoe	14,280	45.69
Total votes		31,255	100.0
Democratic hold			

68th District (Ingham (Lansing—excluding southeast and central portions and portion in Eaton County, Lansing Township))
Party	Candidate	Votes	%
Democratic	Andy Schor (incumbent)	18,471	76.64
Republican	Rob Secaur	5,629	23.36
Total votes		24,100	100.0
Democratic hold			

69th District (Ingham (East Lansing -- portion within county), Locke Township, Meridian Township, Williamstown Township))
Party	Candidate	Votes	%
Democratic	Sam Singh (incumbent)	18,475	67.84
Republican	Frank Lambert	8,759	32.16
Total votes		27,234	100.0
Democratic hold			

70th District (Gratiot (Alma, Bethany Township, Emerson Township, Pine River Township, Seville Township, St. Louis), Montcalm)
Party	Candidate	Votes	%
Republican	Rick Outman (incumbent)	13,372	61.75
Democratic	James Hoisington	8,282	38.25
Total votes		21,654	100.0
Republican hold			

71st District (Eaton (excluding Brookfield Township, Eaton Rapids, Eaton Township, Hamlin Township))
Party	Candidate	Votes	%
Republican	Tom Barrett	17,715	50.44
Democratic	Theresa Abed	17,405	49.56
Total votes		35,120	100.0
Republican gain from Democratic			

72nd District (Allegan (Dorr Township, Leighton Township, Wayland, Wayland Township), Kent (Gaines Township, Kentwood))
Party	Candidate	Votes	%
Republican	Ken Yonker (incumbent)	17,884	68.23
Democratic	Kemal Hamulic	8,329	31.77
Total votes		26,213	100.0
Republican hold			

73rd District (Kent (Cannon Township, Courtland Township, East Grand Rapids, Grand Rapids Township, Nelson Township, Oakfield Township, Plainfield Township, Spencer Township))
Party	Candidate	Votes	%
Republican	Chris Afendoulis	24,255	67.72
Democratic	Mary Polonowski	11,561	32.28
Total votes		35,816	100.0
Republican hold			

74th District (Kent (Algoma Township, Alpine Township, Cedar Springs, Grandville, Rockford, Solon Township, Sparta Township, Tyrone Township, Walker))
Party	Candidate	Votes	%
Republican	Robert VerHeulen (incumbent)	18,787	68.83
Democratic	Richard Erdman	8,507	31.17
Total votes		27,294	100.0
Republican hold			

75th District (Kent (southwest and central Grand Rapids))
Party	Candidate	Votes	%
Democratic	Brandon Dillon (incumbent)	12,393	73.77
Republican	John Lohrstorfer	4,406	26.23
Total votes		16,799	100.0
Democratic hold			

76th District (Kent (north and southeast Grand Rapids))
Party	Candidate	Votes	%
Democratic	Winnie Brinks (incumbent)	15,803	52.13
Republican	Donijo DeJonge	13,824	45.60
U.S. Taxpayers'	William Mohr	689	2.27
Total votes		30,316	100.0
Democratic hold			

77th District (Kent (Byron Township, Wyoming))
Party	Candidate	Votes	%
Republican	Thomas Hooker (incumbent)	16,117	67.0
Democratic	Jessica Hanselman	7,940	33.0
Total votes		24,057	100.0
Republican hold			

78th District (Berrien (Baroda Township, Berrien Township, Bertrand Township, Buchanan, Buchanan Township, Chikaming Township, Galien Township, New Buffalo, New Buffalo Township, Niles, Niles Township, Oronoko Township, Pipestone Township, Sodus Township, Three Oaks To
Party	Candidate	Votes	%
Republican	Dave Pagel (incumbent)	15,360	67.23
Democratic	Cartier Shields	7,488	32.77
Total votes		22,848	100.0
Republican hold			

79th District (Berrien (Bainbridge Township, Benton Charter Township, Benton Harbor, Bridgman, Coloma, Coloma Township, Hager Township, Lake Township, Lincoln Township, Royalton Township, St. Joseph Township, St. Joseph, Watervliet, Watervliet Township))
Party	Candidate	Votes	%
Republican	Al Pscholka (incumbent)	14,742	58.62
Democratic	Eric Lester	9,911	39.41
U.S. Taxpayers'	Carl Oehling	497	1.98
Total votes		25,150	100.0
Republican hold			

80th District (Allegan (excluding Dorr Township, Leighton Township, Wayland, Wayland Township))
Party	Candidate	Votes	%
Republican	Cindy Gamrat	17,630	62.78
Democratic	Geoff Parker	9,451	33.65
Libertarian	Arnis Davidsons	1,003	3.57
Total votes		28,084	100.0
Republican hold			

81st District (St. Clair (Algonac, Berlin Township, Brockway Township, China Township, Clay Township, Clyde Township, Cottrellville Township, East China Township, Emmet Township, Grant Township, Greenwood Township, Lynn Township, Marine City, Marysville, Mussey Township
Party	Candidate	Votes	%
Republican	Daniel Lauwers (incumbent)	17,882	65.08
Democratic	Bernardo Licata	9,596	34.92
Total votes		27,478	100.0
Republican hold			

82nd District (Lapeer)
Party	Candidate	Votes	%
Republican	Todd Courser	15,698	55.09
Democratic	Margaret Guerrero-DeLuca	12,797	44.91
Total votes		28,495	100.0
Republican hold			

83rd District (Sanilac, St. Clair (Burtchville Township, Fort Gratiot Township, Port Huron))
Party	Candidate	Votes	%
Republican	Paul Muxlow (incumbent)	15,013	62.15
Democratic	Marcus Middleton	9,144	37.85
Total votes		24,157	100.0
Republican hold			

=== Districts 84–110 ===
84th District (Huron, Tuscola)
Party	Candidate	Votes	%
Republican	Edward Canfield	16,617	59.35
Democratic	David Jaroch	11,379	40.65
Total votes		27,996	100.0
Republican gain from Democratic			

85th District (Saginaw (Brady Township, Brant Township, Chapin Township, Chesaning Township, Fremont Township, Jonesfield Township, Lakefield Township, Maple Grove Township, Marion Township, Richland Township), Shiawassee)
Party	Candidate	Votes	%
Republican	Ben Glardon (incumbent)	16,882	52.64
Democratic	Annie Dignan Braidwood	13,714	42.76
Libertarian	Roger Snyder	1,473	4.59
Total votes		32,069	100.0
Republican hold			

86th District (Ionia (Belding, Easton Township, Ionia, Ionia Township, Orleans Township, Otisco Township), Kent (Ada Township, Bowne Township, Caledonia Township, Cascade Township, Grattan Township, Lowell, Lowell Township, Vergennes Township))
Party	Candidate	Votes	%
Republican	Lisa Posthumus Lyons (incumbent)	20,273	65.84
Democratic	Lynn Mason	10,518	34.16
Total votes		30,791	100.0
Republican hold			

87th District (Barry, Ionia (Berlin Township, Boston Township, Campbell Township, Danby Township, Keene Township, Lyons Township, North Plains Township, Odessa Township, Orange Township, Portland, Portland Township, Ronald Township, Sebewa Township))
Party	Candidate	Votes	%
Republican	Mike Callton (incumbent)	20,355	66.67
Democratic	Jordan Brehm	10,178	33.33
Total votes		30,533	100.0
Republican hold			

88th District (Ottawa (Allendale Township, Chester Township, Coopersville, Georgetown Township, Polkton Township, Tallmadge Township, Wright Township))
Party	Candidate	Votes	%
Republican	Roger Victory (incumbent)	22,788	79.82
Democratic	Janice Gwasdacus	5,761	20.18
Total votes		28,549	100.0
Republican hold			

89th District (Ottawa (Blendon Township, Ferrysburg, Grand Haven, Grand Haven Township, Olive Township, Park Township, Port Sheldon Township, Robinson Township, Spring Lake Township))
Party	Candidate	Votes	%
Republican	Amanda Price (incumbent)	21,804	67.88
Democratic	Don Bergman	10,316	32.12
Total votes		32,120	100.0
Republican hold			

90th District (Ottawa (Holland -- part within county, Holland Township, Hudsonville, Jamestown Township, Zeeland, Zeeland Township))
Party	Candidate	Votes	%
Republican	Daniela Garcia	19,930	78.31
Democratic	James Haspas	5,520	21.69
Total votes		25,450	100.0
Republican hold			

91st District (Muskegon (Blue Lake Township, Casnovia Township, Cedar Creek Township, Dalton Township, Egelston Township, Fruitport Township, Holton Township, Montague, Montague Township, Moorland Township, Norton Shores, Ravenna Township, Roosevelt Park, Sullivan Town
Party	Candidate	Votes	%
Republican	Holly Hughes	12,737	46.53
Democratic	Collene Lamonte (incumbent)	12,679	46.32
Independent	Alan Jager	1,958	7.15
Total votes		27,374	100.0
Republican gain from Democratic			

92nd District (Muskegon (Fruitland Township, Laketon Township, Muskegon Heights, Muskegon, Muskegon Township, North Muskegon, Whitehall Township))
Party	Candidate	Votes	%
Democratic	Marcia Hovey-Wright (incumbent)	13,846	66.93
Republican	Ken Berman	6,841	33.07
Total votes		20,687	100.0
Democratic hold			

93rd District (Clinton, Gratiot (all except Alma, Bethany Township, Emerson Township, Pine River Township, Seville Township, St. Louis))
Party	Candidate	Votes	%
Republican	Tom Leonard (incumbent)	19,103	56.02
Democratic	Josh Derke	11,929	34.98
Independent	Michael Trebesh	3,068	9.0
Total votes		34,100	100.0
Republican hold			

94th District (Saginaw (Albee Township, Birch Run Township, Blumfield Township, Frankenmuth, Frankenmuth Township, Saginaw Township, St. Charles Township, Swan Creek Township, Taymouth Township, Thomas Township, Tittabawassee Township))
Party	Candidate	Votes	%
Republican	Tim Kelly (incumbent)	20,925	62.35
Democratic	Vincent Mosca	12,634	37.65
Total votes		33,559	100.0
Republican hold			

95th District (Saginaw (Bridgeport Township, Buena Vista Township, Carrollton, James Township, Kochville Township, Saginaw, Spaulding Township, Zilwaukee, Zilwaukee Township))
Party	Candidate	Votes	%
Democratic	Vanessa Guerra	17,371	76.25
Republican	Jordan Haskins	5,412	23.75
Total votes		22,783	100.0
Democratic hold			

96th District (Bay (Bangor Township, Bay City, Essexville, Frankenlust Township, Hampton Township, Kawkawlin Township, Merritt Township, Monitor Township, Portsmouth Township))
Party	Candidate	Votes	%
Democratic	Charles Brunner (incumbent)	13,149	68.07
Republican	Carlos Jaime	6,169	31.93
Total votes		19,318	100.0
Democratic hold			

97th District (Arenac, Clare, Gladwin, Osceola (Evart, Evart Township, Hersey Township, Highland Township, Marion Township, Middle Branch Township, Orient Township, Osceola Township, Sherman Township, Sylvan Township))
Party	Candidate	Votes	%
Republican	Joel Johnson (incumbent)	16,570	63.10
Democratic	Mark Lightfoot	9,688	36.90
Total votes		26,258	100.0
Republican hold			

98th District (Bay (Auburn, Beaver Township, Fraser Township, Garfield Township, Gibson Township, Midland -- portion within county, Mount Forest Township, Pinconning, Pinconning Township, Williams Township), Midland (Homer Township, Jerome Township, Larkin Township, Le
Party	Candidate	Votes	%
Republican	Gary Glenn	15,773	55.39
Democratic	Joan Brausch	12,705	44.61
Total votes		28,478	100.0
Republican hold			

99th District (Isabella, Midland (Coleman, Edenville Township, Geneva Township, Greendale Township, Hope Township, Ingersoll Township, Jasper Township, Mills Township, Mount Haley Township, Porter Township, Warren Township))
Party	Candidate	Votes	%
Republican	Kevin Cotter (incumbent)	11,347	51.52
Democratic	Bryan Mielke	10,676	48.48
Total votes		22,023	100.0
Republican hold			

100th District (Lake, Newaygo, Oceana)
Party	Candidate	Votes	%
Republican	Jon Bumstead (incumbent)	16,226	63.49
Democratic	Mark Balcom	9,330	36.51
Total votes		25,556	100.0
Republican hold			

101st District (Benzie, Leelanau, Manistee, Mason)
Party	Candidate	Votes	%
Republican	Ray Franz (incumbent)	18,637	50.43
Democratic	Tom Stobie	18,316	49.57
Total votes		36,953	100.0
Republican hold			

102nd District (Mecosta, Osceola (Burdell Township, Cedar Township, Hartwick Township, Leroy Township, Lincoln Township, Reed City, Richmond Township, Rose Lake Township), Wexford)
Party	Candidate	Votes	%
Republican	Philip Potvin (incumbent)	14,717	60.12
Democratic	John Ruggles	9,761	39.88
Total votes		24,478	100.0
Republican hold			

103rd District (Crawford, Kalkaska, Missaukee, Ogemaw, Roscommon)
Party	Candidate	Votes	%
Republican	Bruce Rendon (incumbent)	18,257	60.23
Democratic	James Cromwell	10,396	34.30
Independent	Brad Richards	1,658	5.47
Total votes		30,311	100.0
Republican hold			

104th District (Grand Traverse)
Party	Candidate	Votes	%
Republican	Larry C. Inman	17,394	53.17
Democratic	Betsy Coffia	15,317	46.83
Total votes		32,711	100.0
Republican hold			

105th District (Antrim, Charlevoix, Montmorency, Oscoda, Otsego)
Party	Candidate	Votes	%
Republican	Triston Cole	21,221	62.85
Democratic	Jay Calo	12,544	37.15
Total votes		33,765	100.0
Republican hold			

106th District (Alcona, Alpena, Cheboygan (Aloha Township, Benton Township, Burt Township, Ellis Township, Forest Township, Grant Township, Inverness Township, Mentor Township, Mullett Township, Nunda Township, Walker Township, Waverly Township, Wilmot Township), Crawfo
Party	Candidate	Votes	%
Republican	Peter Pettalia (incumbent)	18,614	55.02
Democratic	Robert Kennedy	15,219	44.98
Total votes		33,833	100.0
Republican hold			

107th District (Cheboygan (Beaugrand Township, Cheboygan, Hebron Township, Koehler Township, Mackinaw Township, Munro Township, Tuscarora Township), Chippewa, Emmet, Mackinac)
Party	Candidate	Votes	%
Republican	Lee Chatfield	19,341	60.94
Democratic	Jim Page	12,396	39.06
Total votes		31,737	100.0
Republican hold			

108th District (Delta, Dickinson, Menominee)
Party	Candidate	Votes	%
Republican	Ed McBroom (incumbent)	16,921	59.71
Democratic	Grant Carlson	11,420	40.29
Total votes		28,341	100.0
Republican hold			

Results by county Kivela: 50–60%; 60–70%; Mackin: 50–60%

Results by precinct Kivela: 50–60%; 60–70%; 70–80%; 80–90%; Mackin: 50–60%; 60–70%; Tie: 50%

109th District (Alger, Luce, Marquette (excluding Powell Township, Ishpeming Township), Schoolcraft)
Party	Candidate	Votes	%
Democratic	John Kivela (incumbent)	18,378	65.67
Republican	Pete Mackin	9,607	34.33
Total votes		27,985	100.0
Democratic hold			

Results by county Dianda: 50–60%; 60–70%

Results by precinct Dianda: 50–60%; 60–70%; 70–80%; 80–90%; Michaels: 50–60%; Tie: 50%

110th District (Baraga, Gogebic, Houghton, Iron, Keweenaw, Marquette (Ishpeming Township, Powell Township), Ontonagon)
Party	Candidate	Votes	%
Democratic	Scott Dianda (incumbent)	16,415	60.73
Republican	Bob Michaels	10,614	39.27
Total votes		27,029	100.0
Democratic hold			

== Special elections ==
=== 75th District ===
Brandon Dillon resigned on August 3, 2015 after being elected chairman of the Michigan Democratic Party. Under state law, Governor Rick Snyder called a special primary election on November 4, 2015 and a special general election on March 8, 2016.

Democrat David LaGrand defeated Michael Scruggs with 81% of the vote in the Democratic primary. Blake Edmonds was unopposed in the Republican primary.

75th District special election (March 8, 2016)
Party	Candidate	Votes	%
Democratic	David LaGrand	13,601	77.4
Republican	Blake Edmonds	3,964	22.6
Total votes		17,565	
Democratic hold			

=== 80th and 82nd Districts ===
Vacancies in the 80th and 82nd districts were caused by the expulsion of Cindy Gamrat and resignation of Todd Courser, respectively, on September 11, 2015. Under state law, Lieutenant Governor Brian Calley called a special primary election on November 4, 2015 and a special general election on March 8, 2016.

In the G.O.P. primary, Mary Whiteford defeated seven other candidates, including Gamrat, with just over 50% of the vote in the 80th District; and Gary Howell won an 11-way primary, including Courser, with 27% of the vote in the 82nd District. David Gernant was unopposed in the Democratic primary in the 80th, and Margaret Guerrero DeLuca earned 85% in a three-way Democratic primary in the 82nd.

80th District special election (March 8, 2016)
Party	Candidate	Votes	%
Republican	Mary Whiteford	14,860	64.0
Democratic	David Gernant	6,945	29.9
Libertarian	Arnie Davidsons	1,424	6.1
Total votes		23,229	
Republican hold			

82nd District special election (March 8, 2016)
Party	Candidate	Votes	%
Republican	Gary Howell	13,907	58.6
Democratic	Margaret Guerrero DeLuca	8,680	36.6
Libertarian	Tracy Spilker	1,154	4.9
Total votes		23,741	
Republican hold			

=== 28th District ===
After the death of longtime Macomb County Treasurer Ted Wahby in December 2015, one-term state Rep. Derek Miller was appointed treasurer and resigned his House seat effective February 1, 2016. On February 17, 2016, Gov. Rick Snyder called a special election to fill the remainder of Miller's term that would expire at the end of 2016, with both the special primary and general elections to take place alongside the regularly scheduled elections.

District 28
Republican primary

- Antoine M. Davison

Democratic primary

- Patrick Green
- Paul M. Kardasz
- Lori M. Stone
- Mike Westphall

=== 11th District ===
Democratic state Rep. Julie Plawecki of the 11th District died unexpectedly while hiking in Oregon on June 25, 2016. Gov. Rick Snyder called a special election on July 5, 2016, to fill the remainder of Plawecki's term, with the special primary taking place on August 30 and the special general election to take place alongside the regularly scheduled general election on November 8, 2016. The primary was canceled on July 13, 2016, by Snyder after only one Democrat and one Republican filed for the race, making a primary unnecessary. The Democratic candidate was Plawecki's 22-year-old daughter Lauren. The winner would serve the final two months of the term that was to expire on December 31, 2016.

Candidates

- Robert Pope (R)
- Lauren Plawecki (D)

11th District special election (November 8, 2016)
Party	Candidate	Votes	%
Democratic	Lauren Plawecki	24,020	65.8
Republican	Robert Pope	10,905	29.9
U.S. Taxpayers'	Marc J. Sosnowski	1,586	4.3
Democratic hold			

== See also ==
- Michigan Senate election, 2014
