= 2016 Michigan House of Representatives election =

- November 8, 2016

All 110 seats in the Michigan House of Representatives 56 seats needed for a majority
- Registered: 7,514,055
- Turnout: 63.00% (Note: Of total voting age population.)
	Majority party	Minority party
Leader	Kevin Cotter (term-limited)	Tim Greimel
Party	Republican	Democratic
Leader since	January 14, 2015	January 9, 2013
Leader's seat	99th District	29th District
Last election	63	47
Seats won	63	47
Seat change	Steady	Steady
Popular vote	2,263,633	2,260,633
Percentage	49.20%	49.13%
- Democratic gain Republican gain Democratic hold Republican hold Republican: 40–50% 50–60% 60–70% 70–80% Democratic: 50–60% 60–70% 70–80% 80–90% >90%
Speaker before election
Kevin Cotter
Republican
Elected Speaker
Tom Leonard
Republican

An election was held on November 8, 2016 to elect all 110 members to Michigan's House of Representatives. The election coincided with elections for other offices, including U.S. President, U.S. House of Representatives and Senate. The primary election was held on August 2, 2016.

There was no change in the composition of the House as Republicans retained control, winning 63 seats compared to 47 seats for the Democrats.

Members elected at the 2016 election served in the 99th Michigan Legislature which convened on January 11, 2017.

== Background ==
Over one-third of the House could not seek re-election because of term limits, with the legislators who were elected in the 2010 mid-term elections, that saw the House Republican conference pick up 21 seats, the largest net gain for one party in an election since Michigan's newly constituted term limits went into effect in 1992.

== Term-limited members ==
Under the Michigan Constitution, members of the state Senate are able to serve only two four-year terms, and members of the House of Representatives are limited to three two-year terms. The following members were prevented by term limits from seeking re-election to the House in 2016.

=== Democrats (13) ===
- 2nd District: Alberta Tinsley-Talabi
- 9th District: Harvey Santana
- 14th District: Paul Clemente
- 15th District: George Darany
- 18th District: Sarah Roberts
- 26th District: Jim Townsend
- 31st District: Marilyn Lane
- 50th District: Charles Smiley
- 53rd District: Jeff Irwin
- 54th District: David Rutledge
- 92nd District: Marcia Hovey-Wright
- 96th District: Charles Brunner

=== Republicans (25) ===
- 20th District: Kurt Heise
- 23rd District: Pat Somerville
- 24th District: Anthony G. Forlini
- 30th District: Jeff Farrington
- 32nd District: Andrea LaFontaine
- 33rd District: Ken Goike
- 46th District: Bradford Jacobsen
- 57th District: Nancy Jenkins
- 64th District: Earl Poleski
- 66th District: Aric Nesbitt
- 70th District: Rick Outman
- 72nd District: Ken Yonker
- 77th District: Tom Hooker
- 79th District: Al Pscholka
- 83rd District: Paul Muxlow
- 85th District: Ben Glardon
- 86th District: Lisa Lyons
- 87th District: Mike Callton
- 89th District: Amanda Price
- 97th District: Joel Johnson
- 99th District: Kevin Cotter
- 100th District: Jon Bumstead
- 101st District: Ray Franz
- 102nd District: Phil Potvin
- 103rd District: Bruce Rendon
- 106th District: Peter Pettalia
- 108th District: Ed McBroom

== Predictions ==
Source	Ranking	As of
Governing	Lean R	October 12, 2016

== Results ==
=== Statewide ===
Statewide results of the 2016 Michigan House of Representatives:

Party	Candi- dates	Votes		Seats		
Party	Candi- dates	No.	%	No.	+/–	%
Republican Party	110	2,263,633	49.20%	63	Steady	57.27%
Democratic Party	110	2,260,633	49.13%	47	Steady	42.73%
Libertarian Party	26	53,846	1.17%	0	Steady	0.00%
Green Party	8	11,777	0.26%	0	Steady	0.00%
US Taxpayers Party	6	7,720	0.17%	0	Steady	0.00%
Independent	1	3,643	0.08%	0	Steady	0.00%
Write-in	5	37	0.00%	0	Steady	0.00%
Total	266	4,601,289	100.00%	110	Steady	100.00%

=== District ===
Results of the 2016 Michigan House of Representatives election by district:

District	Democratic		Republican		Others		Total		Result
District	Votes	%	Votes	%	Votes	%	Votes	%	Result
District 1	24,947	68.34%	11,558	31.66%	-	-	36,505	100.00%	Democratic hold
District 2	25,409	71.83%	9,962	28.16%	3	0.01%	35,374	100.00%	Democratic hold
District 3	28,766	96.79%	955	3.21%	-	-	29,721	100.00%	Democratic hold
District 4	24,790	91.87%	1,397	5.18%	796	2.95%	26,983	100.00%	Democratic hold
District 5	17,832	92.51%	1,444	7.49%	-	-	19,276	100.00%	Democratic hold
District 6	26,301	92.52%	2,125	7.48%	-	-	28,426	100.00%	Democratic hold
District 7	32,896	97.61%	806	2.39%	-	-	33,702	100.00%	Democratic hold
District 8	33,270	95.76%	1,470	4.23%	2	0.01%	34,742	100.00%	Democratic hold
District 9	27,560	94.29%	1,668	5.71%	-	-	29,228	100.00%	Democratic hold
District 10	32,787	81.62%	6,027	15.00%	1,357	3.38%	40,171	100.00%	Democratic hold
District 11	23,731	65.05%	12,749	34.95%	-	-	36,480	100.00%	Democratic hold
District 12	24,716	67.11%	12,112	32.89%	-	-	36,828	100.00%	Democratic hold
District 13	23,744	60.76%	15,336	39.24%	-	-	39,080	100.00%	Democratic hold
District 14	20,252	59.44%	12,178	35.75%	1,639	4.81%	34,069	100.00%	Democratic hold
District 15	21,739	61.77%	13,452	38.23%	-	-	35,191	100.00%	Democratic hold
District 16	24,147	63.97%	13,599	36.03%	-	-	37,746	100.00%	Democratic hold
District 17	17,151	44.27%	20,232	52.23%	1,355	3.50%	38,738	100.00%	Republican gain
District 18	29,247	63.31%	16,953	36.69%	-	-	46,200	100.00%	Democratic hold
District 19	19,504	38.58%	31,045	61.42%	-	-	50,549	100.00%	Republican hold
District 20	23,768	46.41%	27,440	53.59%	-	-	51,208	100.00%	Republican hold
District 21	28,260	59.43%	19,292	40.57%	-	-	47,552	100.00%	Democratic hold
District 22	21,487	60.34%	12,341	34.66%	1,780	5.00%	35,608	100.00%	Democratic hold
District 23	24,100	50.34%	23,777	49.66%	-	-	47,877	100.00%	Democratic gain
District 24	19,553	44.93%	23,968	55.07%	-	-	43,521	100.00%	Republican hold
District 25	21,899	54.11%	18,573	45.89%	-	-	40,472	100.00%	Democratic hold
District 26	26,785	59.37%	18,333	40.63%	-	-	45,118	100.00%	Democratic hold
District 27	36,392	76.78%	11,007	23.22%	-	-	47,399	100.00%	Democratic hold
District 28	22,680	66.33%	11,514	33.67%	-	-	34,194	100.00%	Democratic hold
District 29	23,097	71.25%	8,253	25.46%	1,068	3.29%	32,418	100.00%	Democratic hold
District 30	17,026	46.15%	19,863	53.85%	-	-	36,889	100.00%	Republican hold
District 31	22,735	56.16%	15,743	38.89%	2,007	4.96%	40,485	100.00%	Democratic hold
District 32	14,631	36.34%	25,629	63.66%	-	-	40,260	100.00%	Republican hold
District 33	12,987	30.01%	30,295	69.99%	-	-	43,282	100.00%	Republican hold
District 34	24,248	88.55%	3,136	11.45%	-	-	27,384	100.00%	Democratic hold
District 35	44,737	83.81%	8,639	16.19%	-	-	53,376	100.00%	Democratic hold
District 36	13,048	28.16%	33,293	71.84%	-	-	46,341	100.00%	Republican hold
District 37	29,181	60.63%	17,209	35.75%	1,743	3.62%	48,133	100.00%	Democratic hold
District 38	20,711	42.34%	28,205	57.66%	-	-	48,916	100.00%	Republican hold
District 39	20,975	42.25%	25,024	50.41%	3,643	7.34%	49,642	100.00%	Republican hold
District 40	26,669	46.52%	30,664	53.48%	-	-	57,333	100.00%	Republican hold
District 41	20,606	43.55%	26,708	56.45%	-	-	47,314	100.00%	Republican hold
District 42	17,309	32.36%	34,015	63.59%	2,167	4.05%	53,491	100.00%	Republican hold
District 43	16,309	34.53%	30,923	65.47%	-	-	47,232	100.00%	Republican hold
District 44	15,470	31.44%	33,731	68.56%	-	-	49,201	100.00%	Republican hold
District 45	17,792	37.93%	29,121	62.07%	-	-	46,913	100.00%	Republican hold
District 46	14,642	30.69%	33,073	69.31%	-	-	47,715	100.00%	Republican hold
District 47	12,918	27.00%	32,616	68.17%	2,314	4.84%	47,848	100.00%	Republican hold
District 48	22,888	53.82%	19,641	46.18%	-	-	42,529	100.00%	Democratic hold
District 49	24,862	68.45%	11,458	31.55%	-	-	36,320	100.00%	Democratic hold
District 50	22,773	52.03%	20,992	47.97%	-	-	43,765	100.00%	Democratic hold
District 51	17,050	33.97%	30,468	60.70%	2,677	5.33%	50,195	100.00%	Republican hold
District 52	27,620	52.44%	23,535	44.68%	1,519	2.88%	52,674	100.00%	Democratic hold
District 53	35,502	80.40%	7,176	16.25%	1,476	3.34%	44,154	100.00%	Democratic hold
District 54	30,148	74.99%	10,053	25.01%	-	-	40,201	100.00%	Democratic hold
District 55	30,097	69.33%	13,312	30.67%	-	-	43,409	100.00%	Democratic hold
District 56	16,316	38.84%	24,509	58.35%	1,179	2.81%	42,004	100.00%	Republican hold
District 57	18,332	43.62%	23,698	56.38%	-	-	42,030	100.00%	Republican hold
District 58	8,968	24.63%	27,444	75.37%	-	-	36,412	100.00%	Republican hold
District 59	12,117	33.23%	24,342	66.77%	-	-	36,459	100.00%	Republican hold
District 60	26,570	69.31%	9,595	25.03%	2,170	5.66%	38,335	100.00%	Democratic hold
District 61	22,755	44.69%	25,149	49.39%	3,018	5.93%	50,922	100.00%	Republican hold
District 62	17,490	47.46%	17,699	48.03%	1,660	4.50%	36,849	100.00%	Republican hold
District 63	14,749	33.41%	26,878	60.88%	2,523	5.71%	44,150	100.00%	Republican hold
District 64	13,443	37.48%	22,426	62.52%	-	-	35,869	100.00%	Republican hold
District 65	14,321	34.53%	25,098	60.52%	2,055	4.95%	41,474	100.00%	Republican hold
District 66	18,568	45.74%	22,024	54.26%	-	-	40,592	100.00%	Republican hold
District 67	24,929	54.64%	20,698	45.36%	-	-	45,627	100.00%	Democratic hold
District 68	28,373	72.99%	8,365	21.52%	2,132	5.48%	38,870	100.00%	Democratic hold
District 69	29,366	68.37%	13,585	31.63%	-	-	42,951	100.00%	Democratic hold
District 70	10,625	31.99%	21,001	63.24%	1,584	4.77%	33,210	100.00%	Republican hold
District 71	20,926	42.98%	26,315	54.04%	1,450	2.98%	48,691	100.00%	Republican hold
District 72	18,693	41.51%	26,343	58.49%	-	-	45,036	100.00%	Republican hold
District 73	17,885	32.36%	35,216	63.72%	2,165	3.92%	55,266	100.00%	Republican hold
District 74	13,915	30.68%	29,255	64.51%	2,183	4.81%	45,353	100.00%	Republican hold
District 75	25,868	76.39%	7,996	23.61%	-	-	33,864	100.00%	Democratic hold
District 76	27,046	56.72%	18,473	38.74%	2,161	4.53%	47,680	100.00%	Democratic hold
District 77	14,528	34.20%	27,946	65.80%	-	-	42,474	100.00%	Republican hold
District 78	12,529	32.49%	26,037	67.51%	-	-	38,566	100.00%	Republican hold
District 79	15,461	38.42%	23,657	58.78%	1,129	2.81%	40,247	100.00%	Republican hold
District 80	12,376	28.07%	29,721	67.41%	1,990	4.51%	44,087	100.00%	Republican hold
District 81	12,633	31.04%	28,068	68.96%	-	-	40,701	100.00%	Republican hold
District 82	13,492	31.05%	29,962	68.95%	-	-	43,454	100.00%	Republican hold
District 83	12,345	33.54%	23,108	62.79%	1,350	3.67%	36,803	100.00%	Republican hold
District 84	14,026	34.90%	26,142	65.04%	26	0.06%	40,194	100.00%	Republican hold
District 85	15,124	34.44%	24,683	56.21%	4,102	9.34%	43,909	100.00%	Republican hold
District 86	16,516	34.51%	28,617	59.79%	2,726	5.70%	47,859	100.00%	Republican hold
District 87	12,955	28.07%	30,957	67.08%	2,238	4.85%	46,150	100.00%	Republican hold
District 88	11,410	24.93%	34,356	75.07%	-	-	45,766	100.00%	Republican hold
District 89	17,051	34.36%	30,340	61.14%	2,231	4.50%	49,622	100.00%	Republican hold
District 90	11,533	27.14%	30,968	72.86%	-	-	42,501	100.00%	Republican hold
District 91	18,558	43.68%	20,959	49.34%	2,965	6.98%	42,482	100.00%	Republican hold
District 92	22,584	68.20%	10,528	31.80%	-	-	33,112	100.00%	Democratic hold
District 93	15,508	32.81%	29,328	62.05%	2,428	5.14%	47,264	100.00%	Republican hold
District 94	16,402	35.23%	30,150	64.77%	-	-	46,552	100.00%	Republican hold
District 95	23,809	73.88%	8,419	26.12%	-	-	32,228	100.00%	Democratic hold
District 96	22,992	57.98%	16,665	42.02%	-	-	39,657	100.00%	Democratic hold
District 97	13,074	35.15%	24,124	64.85%	-	-	37,198	100.00%	Republican hold
District 98	16,975	39.83%	25,642	60.17%	-	-	42,617	100.00%	Republican hold
District 99	15,291	45.44%	18,358	54.56%	-	-	33,649	100.00%	Republican hold
District 100	12,514	32.73%	25,721	67.27%	-	-	38,235	100.00%	Republican hold
District 101	23,719	45.99%	27,852	54.01%	-	-	51,571	100.00%	Republican hold
District 102	11,099	30.95%	24,761	69.05%	-	-	35,860	100.00%	Republican hold
District 103	18,589	41.70%	25,988	58.30%	-	-	44,577	100.00%	Republican hold
District 104	21,864	43.21%	26,020	51.42%	2,714	5.36%	50,598	100.00%	Republican hold
District 105	14,322	29.94%	33,509	70.06%	-	-	47,831	100.00%	Republican hold
District 106	16,937	34.87%	29,798	61.34%	1,841	3.79%	48,576	100.00%	Republican hold
District 107	14,781	32.91%	30,131	67.09%	-	-	44,912	100.00%	Republican hold
District 108	19,725	47.26%	22,013	52.74%	-	-	41,738	100.00%	Republican hold
District 109	25,380	62.31%	13,892	34.11%	1,457	3.58%	40,729	100.00%	Democratic hold
District 110	23,532	61.05%	15,016	38.95%	-	-	38,548	100.00%	Democratic hold
Total	2,260,633	49.13%	2,263,633	49.20%	77,023	1.67%	4,601,289	100.00%	

== Election matchups ==
Following the primary elections on August 2, general election matchups and results in each district were as follows:

=== Districts 1-28 ===
1st District (Wayne County (part))
Party	Candidate	Votes	%
Democratic	Brian Banks (incumbent)	24,947	68.34%
Republican	William Broman	11,558	31.66%
Total votes		36,505	100.00%
Democratic hold			

2nd District (Wayne County (part))
Party	Candidate	Votes	%
Democratic	Bettie Cook Scott	25,409	71.83%
Republican	Anthony Murray	9,962	28.16%
Write-In	DaNetta L. Simpson	3	0.01%
Total votes		35,374	100.00%
Democratic hold			

3rd District (Wayne County (part))
Party	Candidate	Votes	%
Democratic	Wendell Byrd (incumbent)	28,766	96.79%
Republican	John Brodersen	955	3.21%
Total votes		29,721	100.00%
Democratic hold			

4th District (Wayne County (part))
Party	Candidate	Votes	%
Democratic	Rose Mary Robinson (incumbent)	24,790	91.87%
Republican	Matt Schonert	1,397	5.18%
Green	Daniel Finn	797	2.95%
Total votes		26,983	100.00%
Democratic hold			

5th District (Wayne County (part))
Party	Candidate	Votes	%
Democratic	Fred Durhal III (incumbent)	17,832	92.51%
Republican	Dorothy Patterson	1,444	7.49%
Total votes		19,276	100.00%
Democratic hold			

6th District (Wayne County (part))
Party	Candidate	Votes	%
Democratic	Stephanie Chang (incumbent)	26,301	92.52%
Republican	Attie Pollard	2,125	7.48%
Total votes		28,426	100.00%
Democratic hold			

7th District (Wayne County (part))
Party	Candidate	Votes	%
Democratic	LaTanya Garrett (incumbent)	32,896	97.61%
Republican	Gina Barr	806	2.39%
Total votes		33,702	100.00%
Democratic hold			

8th District (Wayne County (part))
Party	Candidate	Votes	%
Democratic	Sherry Gay-Dagnogo (incumbent)	33,270	95.76%
Republican	Jennifer Rynicki	1,470	4.23%
Write-In	DeShawn Wilkins	2	0.01%
Total votes		34,742	100.00%
Democratic hold			

9th District (Wayne County (part))
Party	Candidate	Votes	%
Democratic	Sylvia Santana	27,560	94.29%
Republican	James Stephens	1,668	5.71%
Total votes		29,228	100.00%
Democratic hold			

10th District (Wayne County (part))
Party	Candidate	Votes	%
Democratic	Leslie Love (incumbent)	32,787	81.62%
Republican	William Brang	6,027	15.00%
Libertarian	Jeremy Morgan	1,357	3.38%
Total votes		40,171	100.00%
Democratic hold			

11th District (Wayne County (part))
Party	Candidate	Votes	%
Democratic	Jewell Jones	23,731	65.05%
Republican	Robert Pope	12,749	34.95%
Total votes		36,480	100.00%
Democratic hold			

11th District (special election) (Wayne County (part))
Party	Candidate	Votes	%
Democratic	Lauren Plawecki	24,020	65.79%
Republican	Robert Pope	10,905	29.87%
U.S. Taxpayers Party of Michigan	Marc Joseph Sosnowski	1,586	4.34%
Total votes		36,511	100.00%
Democratic hold			

12th District (Wayne County (part))
Party	Candidate	Votes	%
Democratic	Erika Geiss (incumbent)	24,716	67.11%
Republican	Erik Soderquist	12,112	32.89%
Total votes		36,828	100.00%
Democratic hold			

13th District (Wayne County (part))
Party	Candidate	Votes	%
Democratic	Frank Liberati (incumbent)	23,744	60.76%
Republican	Annie Spencer	15,336	39.24%
Total votes		39,080	100.00%
Democratic hold			

14th District (Wayne County (part))
Party	Candidate	Votes	%
Democratic	Cara Clemente	20,252	59.44%
Republican	Darrell Stasik	12,178	35.75%
Libertarian	Loel R. Green	1,639	4.81%
Total votes		34,069	100.00%
Democratic hold			

15th District (Wayne County (part))
Party	Candidate	Votes	%
Democratic	Abdullah Hammoud	21,739	61.77%
Republican	Terrance Guido Gerin	13,452	38.23%
Total votes		35,191	100.00%
Democratic hold			

16th District (Wayne County (part))
Party	Candidate	Votes	%
Democratic	Robert Kosowski (incumbent)	24,147	63.97%
Republican	Matthew Morrow	13,599	36.03%
Total votes		37,746	100.00%
Democratic hold			

17th District (Monroe County (part), Wayne County (part))
Party	Candidate	Votes	%
Republican	Joe Bellino, Jr.	20,232	52.23%
Democratic	Bill LaVoy (incumbent)	17,151	44.27%
Constitution	Jeff Andring	1,355	3.50%
Total votes		38,738	100.00%
Republican gain from Democratic			

18th District (Macomb County (part))
Party	Candidate	Votes	%
Democratic	Kevin Hertel	29,247	63.31%
Republican	Renata Polonaise	16,953	36.69%
Total votes		46,200	100.00%
Democratic hold			

19th District (Wayne County (part))
Party	Candidate	Votes	%
Republican	Laura Cox (incumbent)	31,045	61.42%
Democratic	Steve King	19,504	38.58%
Total votes		50,549	100.00%
Republican hold			

20th District (Wayne County (part))
Party	Candidate	Votes	%
Republican	Jeff Noble	27,440	53.59%
Democratic	Colleen Pobur	23,768	46.41%
Total votes		51,208	100.00%
Republican hold			

21st District (Wayne County (part))
Party	Candidate	Votes	%
Democratic	Kristy Pagan (incumbent)	28,260	59.43%
Republican	Derek Moss	19,292	40.57%
Total votes		47,552	100.00%
Democratic hold			

22nd District (Macomb County (part))
Party	Candidate	Votes	%
Democratic	John Chirkun (incumbent)	21,487	60.34%
Republican	Jeff Bonnell	12,341	34.66%
Constitution	Les Townsend	1,780	5.00%
Total votes		35,608	100.00%
Democratic hold			

23rd District (Wayne County (part))
Party	Candidate	Votes	%
Democratic	Darrin Camilleri	24,100	50.34%
Republican	Robert Howey	23,777	49.66%
Total votes		47,877	100.00%
Democratic gain from Republican			

24th District (Macomb County (part))
Party	Candidate	Votes	%
Republican	Steve Marino	23,968	55.07%
Democratic	Dana Camphous-Peterson	19,553	44.93%
Total votes		43,521	100.00%
Republican hold			

25th District (Macomb County (part))
Party	Candidate	Votes	%
Democratic	Henry Yanez (incumbent)	21,899	54.11%
Republican	Steve Naumovski	18,573	45.89%
Total votes		40,472	100.00%
Democratic hold			

26th District (Oakland County (part))
Party	Candidate	Votes	%
Democratic	Jim Ellison	26,785	59.37%
Republican	Randy LeVasseur	18,333	40.63%
Total votes		45,118	100.00%
Democratic hold			

27th District (Oakland County (part))
Party	Candidate	Votes	%
Democratic	Robert Wittenberg (incumbent)	36,392	76.78%
Republican	Kyle Forrest	11,007	23.22%
Total votes		47,399	100.00%
Democratic hold			

28th District (Macomb County (part))
Party	Candidate	Votes	%
Democratic	Patrick Green (incumbent)	22,680	66.63%
Republican	Antoine Davison	11,514	33.67%
Total votes		34,194	100.00%
Democratic hold			

=== Districts 29-55 ===
29th District (Oakland County (part))
Party	Candidate	Votes	%
Democratic	Tim Greimel (incumbent)	23,097	71.25%
Republican	Garren Griffith	8,253	25.46%
Green	Artelia Marie Leak	1,068	3.29%
Total votes		32,418	100.00%
Democratic hold			

30th District (Macomb County (part))
Party	Candidate	Votes	%
Republican	Diana Farrington	19,863	53.85%
Democratic	Michael Notte	17,026	46.15%
Total votes		36,889	100.00%
Republican hold			

31st District (Macomb County (part))
Party	Candidate	Votes	%
Democratic	William Sowerby	22,735	56.16%
Republican	Lisa Valerio	15,743	38.89%
Libertarian	Mike Saliba	2,007	4.96%
Total votes		40,485	100.00%
Democratic hold			

32nd District (Macomb County (part), St. Clair County (part))
Party	Candidate	Votes	%
Republican	Pamela Hornberger	25,629	63.66%
Democratic	Paul Manley	14,631	36.34%
Total votes		40,260	100.00%
Republican hold			

33rd District (Macomb County (part))
Party	Candidate	Votes	%
Republican	Jeffrey Yaroch	30,295	69.99%
Democratic	Yani Warda	12,987	30.01%
Total votes		43,282	100.00%
Republican hold			

34th District (Genesee County (part))
Party	Candidate	Votes	%
Democratic	Sheldon Neeley (incumbent)	24,248	88.55%
Republican	Page Brousseau	3,136	11.45%
Total votes		27,384	100.00%
Democratic hold			

35th District (Oakland County (part))
Party	Candidate	Votes	%
Democratic	Jeremy Moss (incumbent)	44,737	83.81%
Republican	Robert Brim	8,639	16.19%
Total votes		53,376	100.00%
Democratic hold			

36th District (Macomb County (part))
Party	Candidate	Votes	%
Republican	Peter Lucido (incumbent)	33,293	71.84%
Democratic	Diane Young	13,048	28.16%
Total votes		46,341	100.00%
Republican hold			

37th District (Oakland County (part))
Party	Candidate	Votes	%
Democratic	Christine Greig (incumbent)	29,181	60.63%
Republican	Mitch Swoboda	17,209	35.75%
Libertarian	James K. Young	1,743	3.62%
Total votes		48,133	100.00%
Democratic hold			

38th District (Oakland County (part))
Party	Candidate	Votes	%
Republican	Kathy Crawford (incumbent)	28,205	57.66%
Democratic	Amy McCusker	20,711	42.34%
Total votes		48,916	100.00%
Republican hold			

39th District (Oakland County (part))
Party	Candidate	Votes	%
Republican	Klint Kesto (incumbent)	25,024	50.41%
Democratic	Michael Stack	20,975	42.25%
Unaffiliated	Beth McGrath	3,643	7.34%
Total votes		49,642	100.00%
Republican hold			

40th District (Oakland County (part))
Party	Candidate	Votes	%
Republican	Michael McCready (incumbent)	30,664	53.48%
Democratic	Nicole Bedi	26,669	46.52%
Total votes		57,333	100.00%
Republican hold			

41st District (Oakland County (part))
Party	Candidate	Votes	%
Republican	Martin Howrylak (incumbent)	26,708	56.45%
Democratic	Cyndi Peltonen	20,606	43.55%
Total votes		47,314	100.00%
Republican hold			

42nd District (Livingston County (part))
Party	Candidate	Votes	%
Republican	Lana Theis (incumbent)	34,015	63.59%
Democratic	Timothy Johnson	17,309	32.36%
Libertarian	Jonathan Elgas	2,167	4.05%
Total votes		53,491	100.00%
Republican hold			

43rd District (Oakland County (part))
Party	Candidate	Votes	%
Republican	Jim Tedder (incumbent)	30,923	65.47%
Democratic	Ted Villella	16,309	34.53%
Total votes		47,232	100.00%
Republican hold			

44th District (Oakland County (part))
Party	Candidate	Votes	%
Republican	Jim Runestad (incumbent)	33,731	68.56%
Democratic	Mark Venie	15,470	31.44%
Total votes		49,201	100.00%
Republican hold			

45th District (Oakland County (part))
Party	Candidate	Votes	%
Republican	Michael Webber (incumbent)	29,121	62.07%
Democratic	Ted Golden	17,792	37.93%
Total votes		46,913	100.00%
Republican hold			

46th District (Oakland County (part))
Party	Candidate	Votes	%
Republican	John Reilly	33,073	69.31%
Democratic	David Jay Lillis	14,642	30.69%
Total votes		47,715	100.00%
Republican hold			

47th District (Livingston County (part))
Party	Candidate	Votes	%
Republican	Henry Vaupel (incumbent)	32,616	68.17%
Democratic	Keith Van Houten	12,918	27.00%
Libertarian	Rodger Young	2,314	4.84%
Total votes		47,848	100.00%
Republican hold			

48th District (Genesee County (part))
Party	Candidate	Votes	%
Democratic	Pam Faris (incumbent)	22,888	53.82%
Republican	Joseph Reno	19,641	46.18%
Total votes		42,529	100.00%
Democratic hold			

49th District (Genesee County (part))
Party	Candidate	Votes	%
Democratic	Phil Phelps (incumbent)	24,862	68.45%
Republican	Jeremy Baker	11,458	31.55%
Total votes		36,320	100.00%
Democratic hold			

50th District (Genesee County (part))
Party	Candidate	Votes	%
Democratic	Tim Sneller	22,773	52.03%
Republican	Michael Matheny	20,992	47.97%
Total votes		43,765	100.00%
Democratic hold			

51st District (Genesee County (part))
Party	Candidate	Votes	%
Republican	Joe Graves (incumbent)	30,468	60.70%
Democratic	Ryan Bladzik	17,050	33.97%
Libertarian	Mark L. Sanborn	2,677	5.33%
Total votes		50,195	100.00%
Republican hold			

52nd District (Washtenaw County (part))
Party	Candidate	Votes	%
Democratic	Donna Lasinski	27,620	52.44%
Republican	Randy Clark	23,535	44.68%
Green	Eric Borregard	1,519	2.88%
Total votes		52,674	100.00%
Democratic hold			

53rd District (Washtenaw County (part))
Party	Candidate	Votes	%
Democratic	Yousef Rabhi	35,502	80.40%
Republican	Samuel Bissell	7,176	16.25%
Green	Joseph Stevens	1,476	3.34%
Total votes		44,154	100.00%
Democratic hold			

54th District (Washtenaw County (part))
Party	Candidate	Votes	%
Democratic	Ronnie Peterson	30,148	74.99%
Republican	Kevin Jardine	10,053	25.01%
Total votes		40,201	100.00%
Democratic hold			

55th District (Washtenaw County (part))
Party	Candidate	Votes	%
Democratic	Adam Zemke (incumbent)	30,097	69.33%
Republican	Bob Baird	13,312	30.67%
Total votes		43,409	100.00%
Democratic hold			

=== Districts 56-83 ===
56th District (Monroe County (part))
Party	Candidate	Votes	%
Republican	Jason Sheppard (incumbent)	24,509	58.35%
Democratic	Tom Redmond	16,316	38.84%
Constitution	R. Al Bain	1,179	2.81%
Total votes		42,004	100.00%
Republican hold			

57th District (Lenawee County (part))
Party	Candidate	Votes	%
Republican	Bronna Kahle	23,698	56.38%
Democratic	Harvey Schmidt	18,332	43.62%
Total votes		42,030	100.00%
Republican hold			

58th District (Branch County, Hillsdale County)
Party	Candidate	Votes	%
Republican	Eric Leutheuser (incumbent)	27,444	75.37%
Democratic	Mary Hamaty	8,968	24.63%
Total votes		36,412	100.00%
Republican hold			

59th District (Cass County (part), St. Joseph County)
Party	Candidate	Votes	%
Republican	Aaron Miller (incumbent)	24,342	66.77%
Democratic	Carol Higgins	12,117	33.23%
Total votes		36,459	100.00%
Republican hold			

60th District (Kalamazoo County (part))
Party	Candidate	Votes	%
Democratic	Jon Hoadley (incumbent)	26,570	69.31%
Republican	Alexander Ross	9,595	25.03%
Libertarian	Logan Fleckenstein	2,170	5.66%
Total votes		38,335	100.00%
Democratic hold			

61st District (Kalamazoo County (part))
Party	Candidate	Votes	%
Republican	Brandt Iden (incumbent)	25,149	49.39%
Democratic	John Fisher	22,755	44.69%
Libertarian	Ryan Winfield	3,018	5.93%
Total votes		50,922	100.00%
Republican hold			

62nd District (Calhoun County (part))
Party	Candidate	Votes	%
Republican	John Bizon (incumbent)	17,699	48.03%
Democratic	James Haadsma	17,490	47.46%
Libertarian	Michelle Gregoire	1,660	4.50%
Total votes		36,849	100.00%
Republican hold			

63rd District (Calhoun County (part), Kalamazoo County (part))
Party	Candidate	Votes	%
Republican	David Maturen (incumbent)	26,878	60.88%
Democratic	Lynn Shiflea	14,749	33.41%
Green	John Anthony La Pietra	2,523	5.71%
Total votes		44,150	5.71%
Republican hold			

64th District (Jackson County (part))
Party	Candidate	Votes	%
Republican	Julie Alexander	22,426	62.52%
Democratic	Ronald Brooks	13,443	37.48%
Total votes		35,829	100.00%
Republican hold			

65th District (Eaton County (part), Jackson County (part), Lenawee County (part))
Party	Candidate	Votes	%
Republican	Brett Roberts (incumbent)	25,098	60.52%
Democratic	Bonnie Johnson	14,321	34.53%
Libertarian	Ronald A. Muszynski	2,055	4.95%
Total votes		41,474	100.00%
Republican hold			

66th District (Van Buren County, Kalamazoo County (part))
Party	Candidate	Votes	%
Republican	Beth Griffin	22,024	54.26%
Democratic	Annie Brown	18,568	45.74%
Total votes		40,592	100.00%
Republican hold			

67th District (Ingham County (part))
Party	Candidate	Votes	%
Democratic	Tom Cochran (incumbent)	24,929	54.64%
Republican	Leon Clark	20,698	45.36%
Total votes		45,627	100.00%
Democratic hold			

68th District (Ingham County (part))
Party	Candidate	Votes	%
Democratic	Andy Schor (incumbent)	28,373	72.99%
Republican	Randy Pilon	8,365	21.52%
Libertarian	Robert Powell	2,132	5.48%
Total votes		38,870	100.00%
Democratic hold			

69th District (Ingham County (part))
Party	Candidate	Votes	%
Democratic	Sam Singh (incumbent)	29,366	68.37%
Republican	George Nastas III	13,585	31.63%
Total votes		42,951	100.00%
Democratic hold			

70th District (Montcalm County, Gratiot County (part))
Party	Candidate	Votes	%
Republican	James Lower	21,001	63.24%
Democratic	Ken Hart	10,625	31.99%
Green	Michael Anderson	1,584	4.77%
Total votes		33,210	100.00%
Republican hold			

71st District (Eaton County (part))
Party	Candidate	Votes	%
Republican	Tom Barrett (incumbent)	26,315	54.04%
Democratic	Theresa Abed	20,926	42.98%
Libertarian	Marc Lord	1,450	2.98%
Total votes		48,691	100.00%
Republican hold			

72nd District (Allegan County (part), Kent County (part))
Party	Candidate	Votes	%
Republican	Steve Johnson	26,343	58.49%
Democratic	Steve Shoemaker	18,693	41.51%
Total votes		45,036	100.00%
Republican hold			

73rd District (Kent County (part))
Party	Candidate	Votes	%
Republican	Chris Afendoulis (incumbent)	35,216	63.72%
Democratic	Deb Havens	17,885	32.36%
Libertarian	Ron Heeren	2,165	3.29%
Total votes		55,266	100.00%
Republican hold			

74th District (Kent County (part))
Party	Candidate	Votes	%
Republican	Robert VerHeulen (incumbent)	29,255	64.51%
Democratic	Robin Bigger	13,915	30.68%
Libertarian	Bill Gelineau	2,183	4.81%
Total votes		45,353	100.00%
Republican hold			

75th District (Kent County (part))
Party	Candidate	Votes	%
Democratic	David LaGrand (incumbent)	25,868	76.39%
Republican	Chad Rossiter	7,996	23.61%
Total votes		33,864	100.00%
Democratic hold			

76th District (Kent County (part))
Party	Candidate	Votes	%
Democratic	Winnie Brinks (incumbent)	27,046	56.72%
Republican	Casey O'Neill	18,473	38.74%
Libertarian	John George	1,558	3.27%
U.S. Taxpayers Party of Michigan	Brandon Hoezee	603	1.26%
Total votes		47,680	100.00%
Democratic hold			

77th District (Kent County (part))
Party	Candidate	Votes	%
Republican	Tommy Brann	27,946	65.80%
Democratic	Dana Knight	14,528	34.20%
Total votes		42,474	100.00%
Republican hold			

78th District (Berrien County (part), Cass County (part))
Party	Candidate	Votes	%
Republican	Dave Pagel (incumbent)	26,037	67.51%
Democratic	Dean Hill	12,529	32.49%
Total votes		38,566	100.00%
Republican hold			

79th District (Berrien County (part))
Party	Candidate	Votes	%
Republican	Kim LaSata	23,657	58.78%
Democratic	Marletta Seats	15,461	38.42%
Constitution	Carl G. Oehling	1,129	2.81%
Total votes		40,247	100.00%
Republican hold			

80th District (Allegan County (part))
Party	Candidate	Votes	%
Republican	Mary Whiteford (incumbent)	29,721	67.41%
Democratic	John Andrysiak	12,376	28.07%
Constitution	Arnie Davidsons	1,990	4.51%
Total votes		44,087	100.00%
Republican hold			

81st District (St. Clair County (part))
Party	Candidate	Votes	%
Republican	Dan Lauwers (incumbent)	28,068	68.96%
Democratic	Stewart Sternberg	12,633	31.04%
Total votes		40,701	100.00%
Republican hold			

82nd District (Lapeer County)
Party	Candidate	Votes	%
Republican	Gary Howell (incumbent)	29,962	68.95%
Democratic	Margaret Guerrero DeLuca	13,492	31.05%
Total votes		43,454	100.00%
Republican hold			

83rd District (Sanilac County, St. Clair County (part))
Party	Candidate	Votes	%
Republican	Shane Hernandez	23,108	62.79%
Democratic	Jim Frank	12,345	33.54%
Green	Deena Marie Bruderick	1,350	3.67%
Total votes		36,803	100.00%
Republican hold			

=== Districts 84-110 ===
84th District (Huron, Tuscola)
Party	Candidate	Votes	%
Republican	Edward J. Canfield (incumbent)	26,142	65.04%
Democratic	James L. Wencel	14,026	34.90%
Write-in	Chuck Stadler	26	0.06%
Total votes		40,194	100.00%
Republican hold			

85th District (Saginaw (part), Shiawassee)
Party	Candidate	Votes	%
Republican	Ben Frederick	24,683	56.21%
Democratic	Anthony Karhoff	15,124	34.44%
Libertarian	Roger L. Snyder	2,425	5.52%
Constitution	Matthew Shepard	1,674	3.81%
Write-in	Robert Cottrell	3	0.01%
Total votes		43,909	100.00%
Republican hold			

86th District (Kent (part), Ionia (part))
Party	Candidate	Votes	%
Republican	Thomas Albert	28,617	59.79%
Democratic	Lynn Mason	16,516	34.51%
Green	Cliff Yankovich	1,461	3.05%
Libertarian	Bill Gelineau	1,265	2.64%
Total votes		47,859	100.00%
Republican hold			

87th District (Barry, Ionia (part))
Party	Candidate	Votes	%
Republican	Julie Calley	30,957	67.08%
Democratic	Eric Anderson	12,955	28.07%
Libertarian	Joseph P. Gillotte	2,238	4.85%
Total votes		46,150	100.00%
Republican hold			

88th District (Ottawa (part))
Party	Candidate	Votes	%
Republican	Roger Victory (incumbent)	34,356	75.07%
Democratic	Kim Nagy	11,410	24.93%
Total votes		45,766	100.00%
Republican hold			

89th District (Ottawa (part))
Party	Candidate	Votes	%
Republican	Jim Lilly	30,340	61.14%
Democratic	Tim Meyer	17,051	34.36%
Libertarian	Mary Buzuma	2,231	4.50%
Total votes		49,622	100.00%
Republican hold			

90th District (Ottawa (part))
Party	Candidate	Votes	%
Republican	Daniela Garcia (incumbent)	30,968	72.86%
Democratic	Mary M. Yedinak	11,533	27.14%
Total votes		42,501	100.00%
Republican hold			

91st District (Muskegon (part))
Party	Candidate	Votes	%
Republican	Holly Hughes (incumbent)	20,959	49.34%
Democratic	Collene Lamonte	18,558	43.68%
Libertarian	Max Riekse	2,965	6.98%
Total votes		42,482	100.00%
Republican hold			

92nd District (Muskegon (part))
Party	Candidate	Votes	%
Democratic	Terry Sabo	22,584	68.20%
Republican	Marshall Davis	10,528	31.80%
Total votes		33,112	100.00%
Democratic hold			

93rd District (Clinton, Gratiot (part))
Party	Candidate	Votes	%
Republican	Tom Leonard (incumbent)	29,328	62.05%
Democratic	Josh Derke	15,508	32.81%
Libertarian	Tyler D. Palmer	2,428	5.14%
Total votes		47,264	100.00%
Republican hold			

94th District (Saginaw (part))
Party	Candidate	Votes	%
Republican	Tim Kelly (incumbent)	30,150	64.77%
Democratic	Kevin C. Seamon	16,402	35.23%
Total votes		46,552	100.00%
Republican hold			

95th District (Saginaw (part))
Party	Candidate	Votes	%
Democratic	Vanessa Guerra (incumbent)	23,809	73.88%
Republican	Dorothy Tanner	8,419	26.12%
Total votes		32,228	100.00%
Democratic hold			

96th District (Bay (part))
Party	Candidate	Votes	%
Democratic	Brian K. Elder	22,992	57.98%
Republican	David Scholl	16,665	42.02%
Total votes		39,657	100.00%
Democratic hold			

97th District (Arenac, Clare, Gladwin, Osceola (part))
Party	Candidate	Votes	%
Republican	Jason Wentworth	24,124	64.85%
Democratic	Bob Townsend	13,074	35.15%
Total votes		37,198	100.00%
Republican hold			

98th District (Midland (part), Bay (part))
Party	Candidate	Votes	%
Republican	Gary Glenn (incumbent)	25,642	60.17%
Democratic	Geoff Malicoat	16,975	39.83%
Total votes		42,617	100.00%
Republican hold			

99th District (Isabella, Midland (part))
Party	Candidate	Votes	%
Republican	Roger Hauck	18,358	54.56%
Democratic	Bryan Mielke	15,291	45.44%
Total votes		33,649	100.00%
Republican hold			

100th District (Lake, Newaygo, Oceana)
Party	Candidate	Votes	%
Republican	Scott A. VanSingel	25,721	67.27%
Democratic	Sandy Clarke	12,514	32.73%
Total votes		38,235	100.00%
Republican hold			

101st District (Benzie, Leelanau, Manistee, Mason)
Party	Candidate	Votes	%
Republican	Curt VanderWall	27,852	54.01%
Democratic	Dan Scripps	23,719	45.99%
Total votes		51,571	100.00%
Republican hold			

102nd District (Mecosta, Osceola (part), Wexford)
Party	Candidate	Votes	%
Republican	Michele Hoitenga	24,761	69.05%
Democratic	Doug Gabert	11,099	30.95%
Total votes		35,860	100.00%
Republican hold			

103rd District (Iosco, Missaukee, Ogemaw, Roscommon, Crawford)
Party	Candidate	Votes	%
Republican	Daire L. Rendon	25,988	58.30%
Democratic	Jordan Stancil	18,589	41.70%
Total votes		44,577	100.00%
Republican hold			

104th District (Grand Traverse)
Party	Candidate	Votes	%
Republican	Larry C. Inman	26,020	51.42%
Democratic	Betsy Coffia	21,864	43.21%
Libertarian	Kelly J. Clark	2,714	5.36%
Total votes		50,598	100.00%
Republican hold			

105th District (Antrim, Charlevoix, Montmorency, Oscoda, Otsego)
Party	Candidate	Votes	%
Republican	Triston S. Cole (incumbent)	33,509	70.06%
Democratic	Wyatt Knight	14,322	29.94%
Total votes		47,831	100.00%
Republican hold			

106th District (Alcona, Alpena, Cheboygan (part), Crawford, Iosco, Presque Isle)
Party	Candidate	Votes	%
Republican	Sue Allor	29,798	61.34%
Democratic	Robert Kennedy	16,937	34.87%
Libertarian	Dana Carver	1,838	3.78%
Write-in	John Caplis	3	0.01%
Total votes		48,576	100.00%
Republican hold			

107th District (Cheboygan (part), Chippewa, Emmet, Mackinac)
Party	Candidate	Votes	%
Republican	Lee Chatfield (incumbent)	30,131	67.09%
Democratic	Phil Bellfy	14,781	32.91%
Total votes		44,912	100.00%
Republican hold			

108th District (Delta, Dickinson, Menominee)
Party	Candidate	Votes	%
Republican	Beau Matthew LaFave	22,013	52.74%
Democratic	Scott A. Celello	19,725	47.26%
Total votes		41,738	100.00%
Republican hold			

109th District (Alger, Luce, Marquette (part), Schoolcraft)
Party	Candidate	Votes	%
Democratic	John Kivela (incumbent)	25,380	62.31%
Republican	Kevin W. Pfister	13,892	34.11%
Green	Wade Roberts	1,457	3.58%
Total votes		40,729	100.00%
Democratic hold			

Results by county Kivela: 50–60%; 60–70%; Pfister: 50–60%

Results by precinct Kivela: 40–50%; 50–60%; 60–70%; 70–80%; 80–90%; Pfister: 40–50%; 50–60%; 60–70%; Tie: 40–50%

Results by county Dianda: 50–60%; 60–70%

Results by precinct Dianda: 50–60%; 60–70%; 70–80%; Markkanen: 50–60%

110th District (Baraga, Gogebic, Houghton, Iron, Keweenaw, Marquette)
Party	Candidate	Votes	%
Democratic	Scott Dianda (incumbent)	23,532	61.05%
Republican	Gregory Markkanen	15,016	38.95%
Total votes		38,548	100.00%
Democratic hold			

== Special elections ==
=== 1st District ===
The 1st District seat became vacant after Democratic state Rep. Brian Banks had to resign from the legislature as part of plea agreement with the office of Michigan Attorney General Bill Schuette. In exchange for his resignation from the House, the state would just drop multiple felony counts against Banks in which he was alleged to falsify documents to obtain a private loan before he was elected to the state House. Banks agreed to plead guilty to one misdemeanor and spend one day in the Wayne County Jail.

==== Democratic primary ====
1st District special Democratic primary(Wayne County (part))
Party	Candidate	Votes	%
Democratic	Tenisha Yancey	2,215	33.0
Democratic	Pamela Sossi	2,017	30.1
Democratic	Sandra Bucciero	956	14.3
Democratic	Justin Johnson	615	9.2
Democratic	Washington Youson	415	6.2
Democratic	Keith Hollowell	956	2.2
Democratic	Kirkland Garey	107	1.6
Democratic	Burgess Foster	78	1.2
Democratic	John Donahue	76	1.2
Democratic	Gowana Mancill Jr.	45	0.7
Democratic	Ronald Diebel	36	0.5

==== Republican primary ====
1st District special Republican primary
Party	Candidate	Votes	%
Republican	Mark Corcoran	819	74.4
Republican	William Phillips	282	25.6

==== General election ====
1st District special election (Wayne County (part))
Party	Candidate	Votes	%
Democratic	Tenisha Yancey	7,266	71.3
Republican	Mark Corcoran	2,551	25.0
Libertarian	Greg Creswell	334	3.3

=== 109th District ===
==== Background ====
The 109th District seat became vacant after state Rep. John Kivela committed suicide just hours after he was arrested for drunk driving for the second time during his time in the legislature.

==== Democratic primary ====
109th District special Democratic primary
Party	Candidate	Votes	%
Democratic	Sara Cambensy	3,477	36.1
Democratic	Jeremy Hosking	3,344	34.7
Democratic	Joe Derocha	2,435	25.3
Democratic	Tom Curry	386	4.0

==== Republican primary ====
109th District (Alger, Luce, Marquette (part), Schoolcraft)
Party	Candidate	Votes	%
Republican	Rich Rossway	1,671	100

==== General election ====
109th District special election
Party	Candidate	Votes	%
Democratic	Sara Cambensy	11,721	56.7
Republican	Rich Rossway	8,690	42.0
Green	Wade Roberts	276	1.3

=== 68th District ===
==== Background ====
On November 7, 2017, term-limited Democratic state Rep. Andy Schor was elected mayor of Lansing, to succeed Virg Bernero. Schor was to take office on January 1, 2018. After Schor formally resigned from the House, Gov. Rick Snyder was to call a special election to fill the remaining balance of Schor's term, which was set to expire January 1, 2019.
