= Plawecki =

Plawecki is a surname. Notable people with the surname include:

- David Plawecki (1947–2013), American politician
- Julie Plawecki (1961–2016), American politician, wife of Mark
- Kevin Plawecki (born 1991), American baseball player
- Lauren Plawecki (born 1994), American politician, daughter of Julie and Mark
- Lukasz Plawecki (born 1987), Polish kickboxer
- Mark Plawecki (born 1961), American judge, husband of Julie
