= Belda Garza =

American politician

Member of the Michigan House of Representatives from the 8th district
- In office January 1, 1999 – December 31, 2002
- Preceded by: Ilona Varga
- Succeeded by: Alma G. Stallworth

Personal details
- Born: December 14, 1949 (age 76) Mexico City, Mexico
- Party: Democratic

Belda Garza (born December 14, 1949) is an American politician who served in the Michigan House of Representatives from the 8th district from 1999 to 2002.
