= Thomas Stallworth III =

American politician from Michigan

Member of the Michigan House of Representatives from the 8th district
- In office January 2011 – January 2013
- Preceded by: George Cushingberry Jr.
- Succeeded by: David Nathan

Member of the Michigan House of Representatives from the 7th district
- In office January 2013 – January 2015
- Preceded by: Jimmy Womack
- Succeeded by: LaTanya Garrett

Personal details
- Born: Detroit, Michigan
- Party: Democratic
- Education: Michigan State University

Thomas Stallworth III is a politician from Michigan. Stallworth was a Democratic member of the Michigan House of Representatives.

== Early life ==
Stallworth was born in Detroit, Michigan. Stallworth graduated from Mumford High School in Detroit.

== Education ==
Stallworth earned a degree from Michigan State University.

== Career ==
On November 2, 2010, Stallworth won the election and became a Democratic member of Michigan House of Representatives for District 8. Stallworth defeated Keith Franklin with 97.45% of the votes.

On November 6, 2012, Stallworth won the election and became a Democratic member of Michigan House of Representatives for District 7. Stallworth defeated Mark Ashley Price with 97.98% of the votes.

In 2014 he ran unsuccessfully for State Senate, losing in the Democratic primary to David Knezek.

== Personal life ==
Stallworth's wife is Nic Stallworth. They have four children. Stallworth and his family live in Detroit, Michigan.

== See also ==
- Jimmy Womack
