= Mark Plawecki =

American lawyer and judge

Mark Plawecki Chief Judge

20th district, Wayne County, Michigan

Personal details
- Born: April 25, 1961 (age 65)
- Spouse: Julie Plawecki (d. 2016) Mae Plawecki (m. 2021)
- Children: 3, including Lauren Plawecki
- Education: Michigan State University; Thomas M. Cooley Law School (JD)
- Occupation: District judge

Mark J. Plawecki (born April 25, 1961) is a district judge in the U.S. state of Michigan. His district (the 20th) comprises the city of Dearborn Heights in Wayne County, located in suburban Detroit. He was first elected to the seat in 1994, and is currently in his sixth term as chief judge for that court.

== Early life ==
Plawecki attended Detroit Catholic Central and graduated from Dearborn Heights Riverside High school, where he was All-League in tennis, in 1979. He graduated from Michigan State University in 1983 with a bachelor's degree in Business Administration, and earned his Juris Doctor from Thomas M. Cooley Law School in 1987. Plawecki then practiced general law, eventually becoming president of the firm Rombach, Plawecki, and Viggiani. During that time he was also prosecutor for the city of Hazel Park.

== Judicial career ==
Elected to the bench in 1994 at age 33, Plawecki became the youngest judge in Dearborn Heights history. He has been re-elected, without opposition, in 1996, 2002, 2008, 2014, and 2020. He is a past president of both the Wayne County District Judges Association and the Polish American Legal Society (PALS) for Michigan.

On March 30, 2016, Plawecki announced he was running for the Michigan Supreme Court seat vacated by Justice Mary Beth Kelly. He was endorsed by the mayor, clerk, treasurer, and every city council member of Dearborn Heights. He also received the endorsement of the Michigan Association for Justice, a trade group of 1600 attorneys "dedicated to the preservation of justice." Plawecki withdrew from the race in June 2016, following the death of his wife.

== Personal life ==
Plawecki is the author of How Could You Trade Billy Pierce?, which introduced his sabermetric formula for rating Major League Baseball pitchers, and Notes from Outside the Truman Show, which offers his views of the current crisis of U.S. democracy. He was married to Julie Plawecki, who held Michigan's 11th House of Representatives district seat from January 2015 until her death in June 2016. They had three daughters: Rachel, Lauren, and Monica. Plawecki remarried in 2021.
