= Veronica Paiz =

American politician

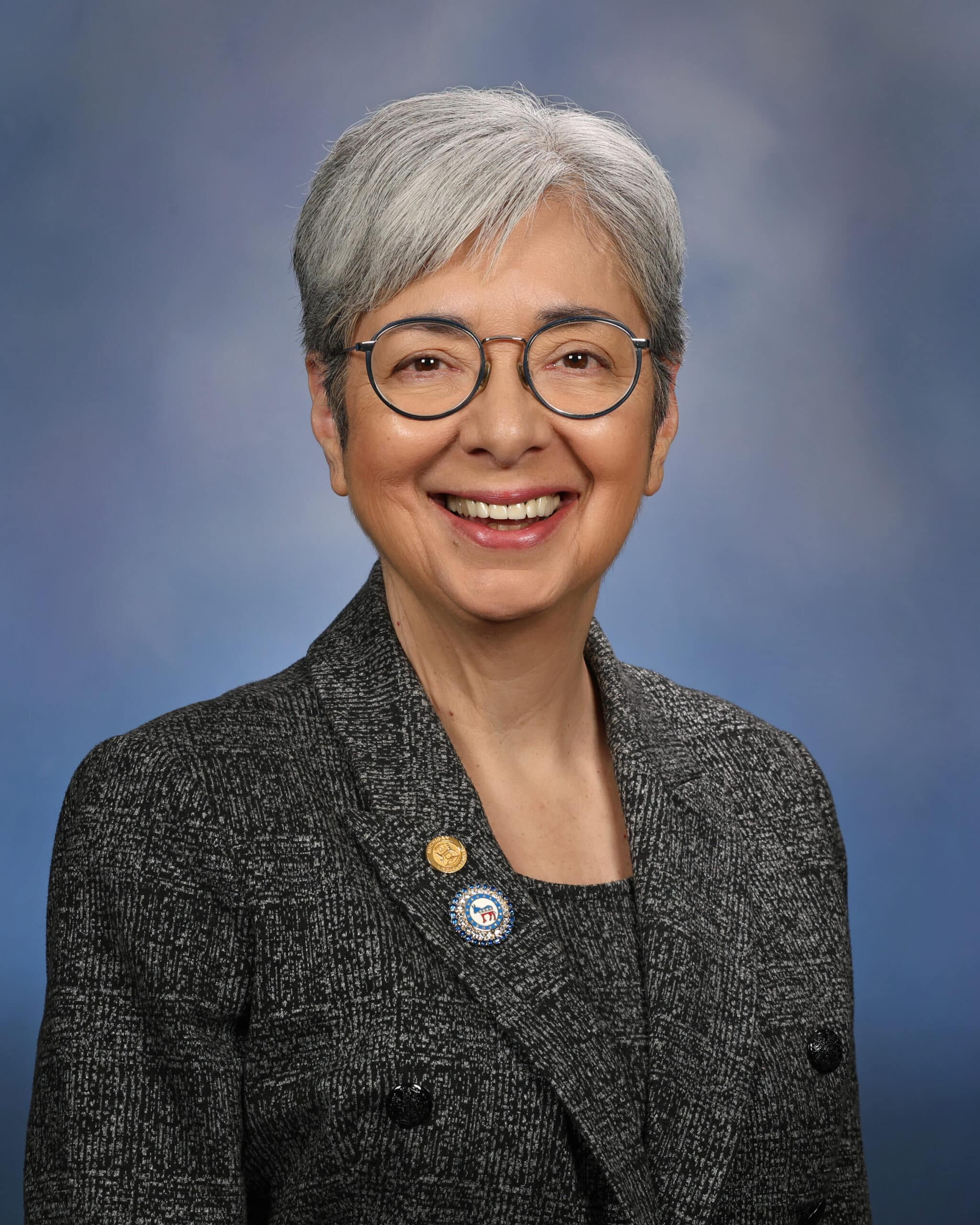

Member of the Michigan House of Representatives
- Incumbent
- Assumed office January 1, 2023
- Preceded by: Jewell Jones
- Constituency: 11th district (2023–2025); 10th district (2025–present)

Personal details
- Born: San Antonio, Texas, U.S.
- Party: Democratic
- Education: Wayne State University (BFA); New York University (MA)

Veronica Paiz is an American politician serving as a member of the Michigan House of Representatives since 2023, currently representing the 10th district. A member of the Democratic Party, Paiz previously served on the city council of Harper Woods, Michigan.

== Early life and education ==
Paiz is a second-generation Mexican American. She has a BFA degree from Wayne State University and a MA degree from New York University.

== Political career ==
Paiz was a member of the Harper Woods, Michigan City Council from 2015 to 2022. She was a member of the Harper Woods Library Board and Recreation Advisory Board.

Paiz was elected as a Democrat to the Michigan House of Representatives from the 11th district in the 2022 election.

Following court-mandated redistricting of the Detroit area, Paiz ran in the 10th district for the 2024 election, winning reelection.

In 2024, Paiz and Carol Glanville sponsored legislation to shield Michigan public libraries from book bans.
