= Jewell Jones =

American politician (born 1995)

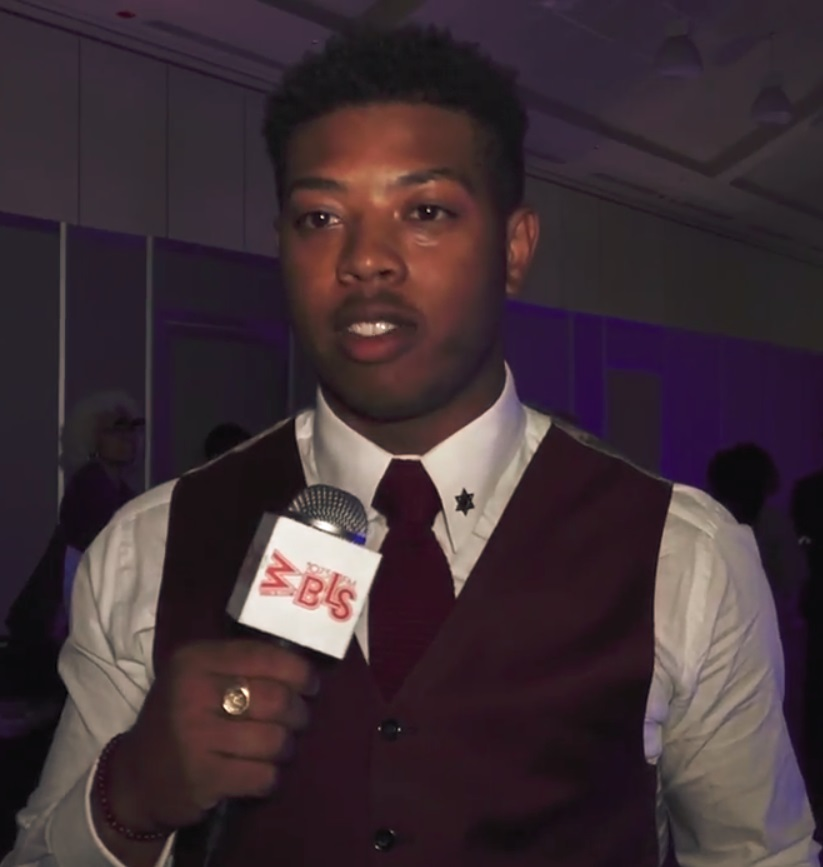
- Jones in 2017

Member of the Michigan House of Representatives from the 11th district
- In office January 1, 2017 – January 1, 2023
- Preceded by: Lauren Plawecki
- Succeeded by: Veronica Paiz

Personal details
- Born: April 11, 1995 (age 31) Inkster, Michigan
- Party: Democratic
- Education: University of Michigan–Dearborn

Jewell Jones (born April 11, 1995) is an American politician from the state of Michigan. He served on the city council of Inkster, Michigan, and was elected to represent the 11th district of the Michigan House of Representatives as the youngest representative in state history. He is a member of the Democratic Party.

== Early life and education ==
Jones's parents involved him in his church and in volunteering from a young age. He became a deacon in his family church. Jones graduated from John Glenn High School in Westland, Michigan, in 2013. He is a student at the University of Michigan–Dearborn, where he is pursuing a Dual-Degree in Business and Political Science. He participated in the Army Reserve Officers' Training Corps. During his years in school, he became involved in politics, working on the political campaigns of David Knezek for Michigan State Senate and Hilliard Hampton for mayor of Inkster, Michigan, in 2014. In 2015, at the age of 20, he was elected and sworn into the Inkster City Council, becoming the youngest councilperson in the city's history. Jones campaigned for Hillary Clinton in the 2016 election.

== Career ==
=== Inkster City Council ===
Jones was elected to the Inkster City Council at the age of 20, becoming the youngest person to ever sit on the city council. As an Inkster City Councilman, Jones focused on the city's education system.

=== Michigan House of Representatives ===
State Representative Julie Plawecki died in 2016, creating a vacancy in the Michigan's 11th House of Representatives district. Her daughter Lauren Plawecki was the only candidate to file for the Democratic Party nomination in the special election to finish her term, which she won. However, precinct delegates selected Jones to be the Democratic Party's nominee for the 11th district in the 2016 general election. He won, receiving 66% of the vote against Republican Party nominee Robert Pope, and became the youngest State Representative in Michigan's history.

== Legal issues ==
In 2018, Jones was pulled over for speeding, window tint, and having an obstructed license plate. He was initially cited for misdemeanor driving with open intoxicants, although officers stated that Jones and all of the passengers were sober. The charge was dismissed.

On April 6, 2021, Jones, then age 25, was arrested after his Chevy Tahoe rolled into a ditch on I-96 in Handy Township; according to prosecutors, several other motorists called to report reckless driving. Paramedics, who arrived first, observed a woman with her pants down, and Jones with his pants partially down. Police subdued Jones with a Taser and pepper spray. According to prosecutors, Jones had a blood alcohol level of at least 0.17%, and a Glock handgun was in the car's cup holder. During the arrest, Jones told officers that he would call governor Gretchen Whitmer, and warned the officers that he runs the state budget. Jones's attorney denied that he resisted arrest, and said that his statements regarding the governor and the budget were made in an attempt to stop the officers from using excessive force. Authorities charged him with resisting and obstructing a police officer, drunken driving offenses, possession of a weapon under the influence of alcohol, and reckless driving. After his arraignment, Jones was found to have attempted to smuggle a handcuff key into the jail. The key was attached to the bottom of his foot, with clear tape. Jones was stripped of his committee assignments in September 2021, and removed from his volunteer auxiliary role with the Inkster Police Department.

In March 2022, Jones pleaded guilty to two felonies and several misdemeanors in connection with the April 2021 incident, and was sentenced to two years' probation under the Holmes Youthful Trainee Act, which benefits offenders ages 17 to 25. A probation violation led to him spending 60 days in the Livingston County jail. In June 2022, Jones pleaded guilty to violating the terms of his probation by drinking alcohol; he apologized and was sentenced to 30 days in jail, but was permitted to serve them at a treatment facility.
