= Stephanie Young (politician) =

American politician (born 1965)

Member of the Michigan House of Representatives
- Incumbent
- Assumed office January 1, 2021
- Preceded by: Sherry Gay-Dagnogo
- Constituency: 8th district (2021–2023); 16th district (2023–present)

Personal details
- Born: January 2, 1965 (age 61)
- Party: Democratic
- Education: Michigan State University

Stephanie A. Young (born January 2, 1965) is an American politician serving as a member of the Michigan House of Representatives since 2021, currently representing the 16th district. She is a member of the Democratic Party.

== Career ==
Young graduated from Michigan State University. In 2023, Detroit mayor Mike Duggan and State Representative Young proposed replacing existing property taxes with a land-value tax.

She was elected to the Michigan House of Representatives from the 8th district in 2020.

Following redistricting, she ran in the 16th district in 2022, winning re-election. She was reelected in 2024.
