= Thomas W. White (born 1937) =

American politician (born 1937)

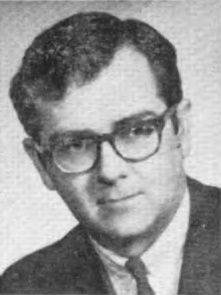

Member of the Michigan House of Representatives from the 11th district
- In office January 1, 1965 – January 1, 1969
- Preceded by: District established
- Succeeded by: Nelis J. Saunders

Personal details
- Born: October 31, 1937 (age 88) Detroit, Michigan, U.S.
- Party: Democratic
- Spouse: Judith Maxon
- Education: University of Michigan; Wayne State University

Thomas W. White (born October 31, 1937) is an American former politician from Michigan.

== Early life ==
White was born on October 31, 1937, in Detroit, Michigan.

== Education ==
White attended the University of Michigan. White earned a B.A. from Wayne State University in history and did graduate work in sociology.

== Career ==
On November 4, 1964, White was elected to the Michigan House of Representatives where he represented the 11th district from January 1, 1965, to January 1, 1969. After his time in the legislature, White became an administrative assistant for the Michigan House Development Authority. White was a member of the NAACP and the American Civil Liberties Union.

== Personal life ==
In 1964, White married Judith Maxon.
