= Nelis J. Saunders =

American politician (1923–2012)

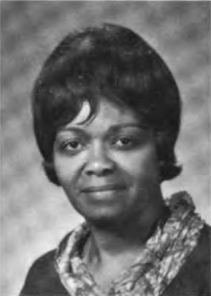

Member of the Michigan House of Representatives from the 11th district
- In office January 1, 1969 – 1972
- Preceded by: Thomas W. White
- Succeeded by: Ted Casimir Stopczynski

Personal details
- Born: September 3, 1923 Orlando, Florida, U.S.
- Died: February 10, 2012 (aged 88)
- Party: Democratic
- Education: Florida Memorial College; Wayne State University

Nelis J. Saunders (September 3, 1923 – February 10, 2012) was a Michigan politician.

== Early life ==
Saunders was born on September 3, 1923, in Orlando, Florida.

== Education ==
Saunders earned an A.A. from Florida Memorial College. Saunders attended Wayne State University where she studied journalism.

== Career ==
Saunders worked for the Michigan Chronicle. In 1960 and 1962, Saunders was defeated in the Democratic primary for the Michigan House of Representatives seat representing the Wayne County 11th district. In 1964, Saunders was again defeated in the primary for the Michigan Senate seat representing the 4th district. Saunders was defeated in two more primaries for the state House, for the 24th district in 1965 and the 11th district in 1966. On November 7, 1968, Saunders was elected to the Michigan House of Representatives where she represented the 9th district from January 8, 1969, to 1972. After her career in the state House, Saunders went on to be defeated in two more primaries, for the 20th district in 1972 and the 24th district in 1974.

== Personal life ==
Saunders was a member of the NAACP. Saunders was Baptist.

== Death ==
Saunders died on February 10, 2012.
