= Michigan's 7th House of Representatives district =

American legislative district

Michigan's 7th State House of Representatives district
Representative
Tonya Myers Phillips; D–Detroit
- Demographics: 27.8% White; 50.1% Black; 1.4% Hispanic; 14% Asian; 0.3% Native American; 0.1% Hawaiian/Pacific Islander; 1.4% Other; 4.9% Multiracial
- Population (2024): 91,945

Michigan's 7th House of Representatives district is a legislative district within the Michigan House of Representatives located in Wayne County. The district was created in 1965, when the Michigan Supreme Court ordered the reapportionment of state legislative districts from a county-based system to a proportional one following the Supreme Court case Reynolds v. Sims. It is currently represented by Democrat Tonya Myers Phillips of Detroit.

== List of representatives ==
Representative	Party	Years	Residence	Notes
Stephen Stopczynski	Democratic	1965–1972	Detroit	Redistricted to the 19th district.
Raymond W. Hood	Democratic	1973–1982	Detroit	Redistricted from the 14th district.
Nelson W. Saunders	Democratic	1983–1992	Detroit	Redistricted to the 10th district.
Raymond M. Murphy	Democratic	1993–1998	Detroit	Redistricted from the 17th district; resigned November 1998 after being elected to the Michigan Senate.
Hansen Clarke	Democratic	1999–2002	Detroit	Previously served in the 16th district.
Virgil Smith Jr.	Democratic	2003–2008	Detroit	Term limited.
Dr. James "Jimmy" Womack	Democratic	2009–2012	Detroit	
Thomas F. Stallworth III	Democratic	2013–2014	Detroit	Redistricted from the 8th district.
LaTanya Garrett	Democratic	2015–2020	Detroit	Term limited.
Helena Scott	Democratic	2021–2024	Detroit	Redistricted to the 8th district.
Tonya Myers Phillips	Democratic	2025–present	Detroit	

== Historical district boundaries ==
Map	Description	Apportionment Plan	Notes
	Wayne County (part): Detroit (part)	1964 Apportionment Plan (Note: Referred to as the Austin-Kleiner plan.)	
	Wayne County (part): Detroit (part)	1972 Apportionment Plan (Note: Referred to as the Hatcher-Kleiner plan.)	
	Wayne County (part): Detroit (part)	1982 Apportionment Plan	
	Wayne County (part): Detroit (part)	1992 Apportionment Plan	
	Wayne County (part): Detroit (part)	2001 Apportionment Plan	
	Wayne County (part): Detroit (part); Highland Park	2011 Apportionment Plan	
	Oakland County (part): Ferndale (part); Pleasant Ridge; Royal Oak (part); Royal Oak Township (part); Wayne County (part): Detroit (part)	2021 Apportionment Plan (Note: Referred to as the Hickory plan.)	
	Wayne County (part): Detroit (part); Hamtramck; Highland Park	Remedial 2021 Apportionment Plan Approved in 2024 (Note: Referred to as the Motown Sound FC E1 plan.)	

== Recent elections ==
=== 2020s ===
2026 Michigan House of Representatives election
Party	Candidate	Votes	%
Democratic	Tonya Myers Phillips (incumbent)	24,947	95.11
Republican	Reginald Moorer	1,282	4.89
Total votes		26,229	100
Democratic hold			

2024 Michigan House of Representatives election
Party	Candidate	Votes	%
Democratic	Tonya Myers Phillips	22,713	78.91
Republican	Barry L. Altman	4,331	15.05
Working Class	Linda Rayburn	1,740	6.05
Total votes		28,784	100
Democratic hold			

2022 Michigan House of Representatives election
Party	Candidate	Votes	%
Democratic	Helena Scott (incumbent)	34,427	100
Total votes		34,427	100
Democratic hold			

2020 Michigan House of Representatives election
Party	Candidate	Votes	%
Democratic	Helena Scott	32,483	93.03
Working Class	Kimberly Givens	1,224	3.51
Republican	Ronald Cole	791	2.27
Green	Anita Belle	420	1.2
Total votes		34,918	100
Democratic hold			

=== 2010s ===
2018 Michigan House of Representatives election
Party	Candidate	Votes	%
Democratic	LaTanya Garrett (incumbent)	25,838	97.62
Republican	Marcelis Turner	630	2.38
Total votes		26,468	100
Democratic hold			

2016 Michigan House of Representatives election
Party	Candidate	Votes	%
Democratic	LaTanya Garrett (incumbent)	32,896	97.61
Republican	Gina Alicia Barr	806	2.39
Total votes		33,702	100
Democratic hold			

2014 Michigan House of Representatives election
Party	Candidate	Votes	%
Democratic	LaTanya Garrett	23,164	97.77
Republican	David Bradley	528	2.23
Total votes		23,692	100
Democratic hold			

2012 Michigan House of Representatives election
Party	Candidate	Votes	%
Democratic	Thomas F. Stallworth III	39,384	97.98
Republican	Mark Ashley Price	813	2.02
Total votes		40,197	100
Democratic hold			

2010 Michigan House of Representatives election
Party	Candidate	Votes	%
Democratic	Jimmy Womack (incumbent)	16,654	95.11
Republican	Debra Duren	511	2.92
Green	Derek M. Grigsby	345	1.97
Total votes		17,510	100
Democratic hold			

=== 2000s ===
2008 Michigan House of Representatives election
Party	Candidate	Votes	%
Democratic	Jimmy Womack	29,845	95.69
Green	Derek M. Grigsby	1,344	4.31
Total votes		31,189	100
Democratic hold			

2006 Michigan House of Representatives election
Party	Candidate	Votes	%
Democratic	Virgil Smith (incumbent)	21,788	97.22
Green	Derek M. Grigsby	622	2.78
Total votes		22,410	100
Democratic hold			

2004 Michigan House of Representatives election
Party	Candidate	Votes	%
Democratic	Virgil Smith (incumbent)	30,393	96.43
Republican	Dolores Broderson	1,125	3.57
Total votes		31,518	100
Democratic hold			

2002 Michigan House of Representatives election
Party	Candidate	Votes	%
Democratic	Virgil Smith	21,165	96.11
Republican	Dolores Broderson	857	3.89
Total votes		22,022	100
Democratic hold			

2000 Michigan House of Representatives election
Party	Candidate	Votes	%
Democratic	Hansen Clarke (incumbent)	21,400	94.8
Republican	Curtis R. Jacobson	1,175	5.2
Total votes		22,575	100
Democratic hold			

=== 1990s ===
1998 Michigan House of Representatives election
Party	Candidate	Votes	%
Democratic	Hansen Clarke	17,010	94.02
Republican	Willie J. Cambell	1,081	5.98
Total votes		18,091	100
Democratic hold			
