= Michigan's 8th House of Representatives district =

American legislative district

Michigan's 8th State House of Representatives district
Representative
Helena Scott; D–Detroit
- Demographics: 25.4% White; 67.2% Black; 2.4% Hispanic; 1% Asian; 0.1% Native American; 0.7% Other; 3.3% Multiracial
- Population (2024): 89,127

Michigan's 8th House of Representatives district is a legislative district within the Michigan House of Representatives located in the counties of Oakland and Wayne. The district was created in 1965, when the Michigan Supreme Court ordered the reapportionment of state legislative districts from a county-based system to a proportional one following the Supreme Court case Reynolds v. Sims. It is currently represented by Democrat Helena Scott of Detroit.

== List of representatives ==
Representative	Party	Years	Residence	Notes
James Bradley	Democratic	1965–1972	Detroit	Reapportioned from the former Wayne County, 5th district; redistricted to the 15th district.
Daisy Elliott	Democratic	1973–1978	Detroit	Redistricted from the 22nd district.
Edward Vaughn	Democratic	1979–1980	Detroit	
Daisy Elliott	Democratic	1981–1982	Detroit	
Carolyn Cheeks Kilpatrick	Democratic	1983–1992	Detroit	Redistricted from the 18th district; redistricted to the 9th district.
Ilona Varga	Democratic	1993–1998	Detroit	Redistricted from the 3rd district; term limited.
Belda Garza	Democratic	1999–2002	Detroit	
Alma Grace Stallworth	Democratic	2003–2004	Detroit	Previously served in the 12th district; term limited.
George Cushingberry Jr.	Democratic	2005–2010	Detroit	Previously served in the 4th district; term limited.
Thomas F. Stallworth III	Democratic	2011–2012	Detroit	Redistricted to the 7th district.
David Nathan	Democratic	2013–2014	Detroit	Redistricted from the 11th district; term limited.
Sherry Gay-Dagnogo	Democratic	2015–2020	Detroit	Term limited.
Stephanie Young	Democratic	2021–2022	Detroit	Redistricted to the 16th district.
Mike McFall	Democratic	2023–2024	Hazel Park	Redistricted to the 14th district.
Helena Scott	Democratic	2025–present	Detroit	Redistricted from the 7th district.
Chris Gilmer-Hill	Democratic	(Note: Member-elect.)	Detroit	

== Historical district boundaries ==
Map	Description	Apportionment Plan	Notes
	Wayne County (part): Detroit (part)	1964 Apportionment Plan (Note: Referred to as the Austin-Kleiner plan.)	
	Wayne County (part): Detroit (part)	1972 Apportionment Plan (Note: Referred to as the Hatcher-Kleiner plan.)	
	Wayne County (part): Detroit (part)	1982 Apportionment Plan	
	Wayne County (part): Detroit (part); River Rouge	1992 Apportionment Plan	
	Wayne County (part): Detroit (part)	2001 Apportionment Plan	
	Wayne County (part): Detroit (part)	2011 Apportionment Plan	
	Oakland County (part): Ferndale (part); Hazel Park; Madison Heights (part); Wayne County (part): Detroit (part); Highland Park	2021 Apportionment Plan (Note: Referred to as the Hickory plan.)	
	Oakland County (part): Ferndale; Pleasant Ridge; Wayne County (part): Detroit (part)	Remedial 2021 Apportionment Plan Approved in 2024 (Note: Referred to as the Motown Sound FC E1 plan.)	

== Recent elections ==
=== 2020s ===
2026 Michigan House of Representatives election
Party	Candidate	Votes	%
Democratic	Chris Gilmer-Hill	34,296	90.96
Republican	Bruce P. Langran	2,871	7.61
Green	Stephen Boyle	536	1.42
Total votes		37,703	100
Democratic hold			

2024 Michigan House of Representatives election
Party	Candidate	Votes	%
Democratic	Helena Scott	37,677	87.53
Republican	Alex Kuhn	3,964	9.21
Working Class	Logan Ausherman	1,402	3.26
Total votes		43,043	100
Democratic hold			

2022 Michigan House of Representatives election
Party	Candidate	Votes	%
Democratic	Mike McFall	23,364	78.88
Republican	Robert Noble	6,254	21.12
Total votes		29,618	100
Democratic hold			

2020 Michigan House of Representatives election
Party	Candidate	Votes	%
Democratic	Stephanie A. Young	35,945	96.74
Republican	Miroslawa Teresa Gorak	1,210	3.26
Total votes		37,155	100
Democratic hold			

=== 2010s ===
2018 Michigan House of Representatives election
Party	Candidate	Votes	%
Democratic	Sherry Gay-Dagnogo (incumbent)	26,995	96.35
Republican	Valerie R. Parker	1,022	3.65
Total votes		28,017	100
Democratic hold			

2016 Michigan House of Representatives election
Party	Candidate	Votes	%
Democratic	Sherry Gay-Dagnogo (incumbent)	33,270	95.76
Republican	Jennifer Rynicki	1,470	4.23
Write-In	DeShawn Wilkins	2	0.01
Total votes		34,742	100
Democratic hold			

2014 Michigan House of Representatives election
Party	Candidate	Votes	%
Democratic	Sherry Gay-Dagnogo	23,008	96.76
Republican	Christopher Ewald	770	3.24
Total votes		23,778	100
Democratic hold			

2012 Michigan House of Representatives election
Party	Candidate	Votes	%
Democratic	David E. Nathan	38,792	96.92
Republican	David Porter	1,231	3.08
Total votes		40,023	100
Democratic hold			

2010 Michigan House of Representatives election
Party	Candidate	Votes	%
Democratic	Thomas F. Stallworth III	22,818	97.45
Republican	Keith Franklin	597	2.55
Total votes		23,415	100
Democratic hold			

=== 2000s ===
2008 Michigan House of Representatives election
Party	Candidate	Votes	%
Democratic	George Cushingberry, Jr. (incumbent)	38,222	96.9
Libertarian	Thomas W. Jones	1,224	3.1
Total votes		39,446	100
Democratic hold			

2006 Michigan House of Representatives election
Party	Candidate	Votes	%
Democratic	George Cushingberry, Jr. (incumbent)	28,288	96.59
Republican	Melvin E. Byrd	961	3.28
Write-In	Daniel L. Martin	37	0.13
Total votes		29,286	100
Democratic hold			

2004 Michigan House of Representatives election
Party	Candidate	Votes	%
Democratic	George Cushingberry, Jr.	37,046	95.69
Republican	Melvin E. Byrd	1,667	4.31
Total votes		38,713	100
Democratic hold			

2002 Michigan House of Representatives election
Party	Candidate	Votes	%
Democratic	Alma G. Stallworth	27,707	97.34
Republican	Melvin E. Byrd	744	2.61
Write-In	Doris J. Massey-Stuppard	13	0.05
Total votes		28,464	100
Democratic hold			

2000 Michigan House of Representatives election
Party	Candidate	Votes	%
Democratic	Belda Garza (incumbent)	13,527	90.96
Republican	Judith C. Montville	1,345	9.04
Total votes		14,872	100
Democratic hold			

=== 1990s ===
1998 Michigan House of Representatives election
Party	Candidate	Votes	%
Democratic	Belda Garza	9,606	85.13
Republican	Cheryl Fobbs-Lewis	1,678	14.87
Total votes		11,284	100
Democratic hold			
