= George Cushingberry Jr. =

American politician (born 1953)

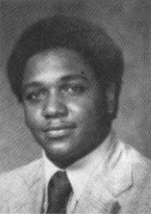

Member of the Michigan House of Representatives from the 8th district
- In office January 1, 2005 – December 31, 2010
- Preceded by: Alma G. Stallworth
- Succeeded by: Thomas Stallworth III

Member of the Michigan House of Representatives from the 4th district
- In office January 1, 1975 – December 31, 1982
- Preceded by: Alma G. Stallworth
- Succeeded by: Alma G. Stallworth

Personal details
- Born: January 6, 1953 (age 73) Royal Oak Township, Michigan
- Party: Democratic
- Spouse: Maria Hazel Drew Cushingberry
- Occupation: Politician

George Cushingberry Jr. (born January 6, 1953) is an American politician from Michigan. Cushingberry was a member of the Detroit City Council and a member of Michigan House of Representatives.

== Early life ==
On January 6, 1953, Cushingberry was born in Detroit, Michigan. Cushingberry's father was George Cushingberry. Cushingberry's mother was Edna Cushingberry. In 1971, Cushingberry graduated from Detroit Cass Technical High School.

== Education ==
Cushingberry earned a bachelor's degree and a master's degree in Political Science, Urban Politics, Policy, and Administration from Wayne State University. In 1991 he earned his Juris Doctor from the University of Detroit Mercy School of Law.

== Career ==
Elected in 1975, Cushingberry became the youngest person to serve in the Michigan State House, where he served until 1982. After leaving the House, he became a member of the Wayne County Board of Commissioners, where he served for sixteen years.

On November 2, 2004, Cushingberry won the election and became a Democratic member of Michigan House of Representatives for District 8. Cushingberry defeated Melvin E. Byrd with 95.69% of the votes.

On August 9, 2005, Cushingberry was charged with two felony counts of perjury for allegedly lying when he signed documents stating he'd met campaign finance requirements in 2004, and one misdemeanor count for failing to file campaign finance statements on time. On April 17, 2007, the charges were dismissed.

On November 7, 2006, as an incumbent, Cushingberry won the election and continued serving District 8. Cushingberry defeated Melvin E. Byrd and Daniel L. Martin with 96.59% of the votes. On November 4, 2008, as an incumbent, Cushingberry won the election and continued serving District 8. Cushingberry defeated Thomas W. Jones with 96.90% of the votes.

After being elected Cushingberry was appointed the Chairman of the Appropriations Committee until 2010. After an unsuccessful run for State Senator, Cushingberry ran for City Council representing District 2 in Northwest Detroit winning by over 50% of the districts voters. Cushingberry was elected President Pro-Tempore of the City Council in 2014 and appointed Chairman of the Budget, Finance and, Audit Committee.

Cushingberry is an associate pastor at Northwest Unity Baptist Church in Detroit. He is a life member of the National Association for the Advancement of Colored People (NAACP), and hosts the "Northwest Unity Prospector Reveals", on radio station WDRJ 1440 AM, Detroit MI from 2:30 - 3:30 every Saturday. He is also a practicing Attorney in the following areas family law, commercial litigation(Business Law), bankruptcy, criminal defense and, owner of The Law Firm of George Cushingberry and Associates.

== Personal life ==
Cushingberry's wife is Maria Hazel Drew Cushingberry. They have two children.
