= Alma G. Stallworth =

American politician (1932–2020)

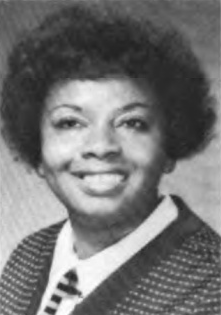

Member of the Michigan House of Representatives
- In office January 1, 2003 – December 31, 2004
- Preceded by: Belda Garza
- Succeeded by: George Cushingberry Jr.
- Constituency: 8th district (2003-2004)
- In office January 1, 1983 – December 31, 1996
- Preceded by: George Cushingberry Jr.
- Succeeded by: Keith Stallworth
- Constituency: 4th district (1983-1992); 12th district (1993-1996)
- In office January 1, 1971 – December 31, 1974
- Preceded by: Jack Faxon
- Succeeded by: George Cushingberry Jr.
- Constituency: 15th district (1971-1972); 4th district (1973-1974)

Personal details
- Born: November 15, 1932 Little Rock, Arkansas
- Died: August 25, 2020 (aged 87) Detroit, Michigan
- Party: Democratic
- Occupation: Politician

Alma G. Stallworth (November 15, 1932 – August 25, 2020) was an American politician who served in the Michigan House of Representatives from 1971 to 1974, 1983 to 1996 and from 2003 to 2004. She also founded the Black Caucus Foundation of Michigan in 1985.

Born in Little Rock, Arkansas, she attended Wayne State University and Chelsea University. Stallworth is also an honorary member of Alpha Kappa Alpha sorority. She also served as a member of the Detroit Board of Education.

Stallworth died on August 25, 2020, in Detroit, Michigan, at age 87.
