= Michigan's 11th House of Representatives district =

American legislative district

Michigan's 11th State House of Representatives district
Representative
Donavan McKinney; D–Detroit
- Demographics: 21.7% White; 66.5% Black; 2.7% Hispanic; 4.1% Asian; 0.3% Native American; 0.3% Other; 4.5% Multiracial
- Population (2024): 93,272

Michigan's 11th House of Representatives district is a legislative district within the Michigan House of Representatives located in the counties of Macomb and Wayne. The district was created in 1965, when the Michigan Supreme Court ordered the reapportionment of state legislative districts from a county-based system to a proportional one following the Supreme Court case Reynolds v. Sims. It is currently represented by Democrat Donavan McKinney of Detroit.

== List of representatives ==
Representative	Party	Years	Residence	Notes
Thomas W. White	Democratic	1965–1968	Detroit	
Nelis J. Saunders	Democratic	1969–1972	Detroit	
Thaddeus Casimir Stopczynski	Democratic	1973–1982	Detroit	
Stanley Stopczynski	Democratic	1983–1992	Detroit	Redistricted from the 19th district.
Morris W. Hood Jr.	Democratic	1993–1998	Detroit	Redistricted from the 6th district; died October 1998.
Irma Clark-Coleman	Democratic	1999–2002	Detroit	
Morris W. Hood III	Democratic	2003–2008	Detroit	Term limited.
David Nathan	Democratic	2009–2012	Detroit	Redistricted to the 8th district.
David Knezek	Democratic	2013–2014	Dearborn	
Julie Plawecki	Democratic	2015–2016	Dearborn Heights	Died June 2016.
Lauren Plawecki	Democratic	2016 (Note: Elected in a 2016 special election to replace her mother, Rep. Julie Plawecki, who died.)	Dearborn Heights	
Jewell Jones	Democratic	2017–2022	Inkster	Term limited.
Veronica Paiz	Democratic	2023–2024	Harper Woods	Redistricted to the 10th district.
Donavan McKinney	Democratic	2025–present	Detroit	Redistricted from the 14th district.
Kimberly Fisher	Democratic	(Note: Member-elect.)	Detroit	

== Historical district boundaries ==
Map	Description	Apportionment Plan	Notes
	Wayne County (part): Detroit (part)	1964 Apportionment Plan (Note: Referred to as the Austin-Kleiner plan.)	
	Wayne County (part): Detroit (part)	1972 Apportionment Plan (Note: Referred to as the Hatcher-Kleiner plan.)	
	Wayne County (part): Detroit (part)	1982 Apportionment Plan	
	Wayne County (part): Detroit (part)	1992 Apportionment Plan	
	Wayne County (part): Dearborn (part); Detroit (part)	2001 Apportionment Plan	
	Wayne County (part): Dearborn Heights (part); Garden City; Inkster; Livonia (part); Westland (part)	2011 Apportionment Plan	
	Macomb County (part): St. Clair Shores (part); Wayne County (part): Detroit (part); Harper Woods	2021 Apportionment Plan (Note: Referred to as the Hickory plan.)	
	Macomb County (part): Warren (part); Wayne County (part): Detroit (part)	Remedial 2021 Apportionment Plan Approved in 2024 (Note: Referred to as the Motown Sound FC E1 plan.)	

== Recent elections ==
=== 2020s ===
2026 Michigan House of Representatives election
Party	Candidate	Votes	%
Democratic	Kimberly Fisher	23,826	86.38
Republican	Matthew Stafford	3,757	13.62
Total votes		27,583	100
Democratic hold			

2024 Michigan House of Representatives election
Party	Candidate	Votes	%
Democratic	Donavan McKinney	28,031	82.31
Republican	Dale J. Walker	6,025	17.69
Total votes		34,056	100
Democratic hold			

2022 Michigan House of Representatives election
Party	Candidate	Votes	%
Democratic	Veronica Paiz	23,656	66.57
Republican	Mark T. Foster	11,882	33.43
Total votes		35,538	100
Democratic hold			

2020 Michigan House of Representatives election
Party	Candidate	Votes	%
Democratic	Jewell Jones (incumbent)	28,182	65.22
Republican	James C. Townsend	15,030	34.78
Total votes		43,212	100
Democratic hold			

=== 2010s ===
2018 Michigan House of Representatives election
Party	Candidate	Votes	%
Democratic	Jewell Jones (incumbent)	20,706	66.88
Republican	James C. Townsend	10,252	33.12
Total votes		30,958	100
Democratic hold			

2016 Michigan House of Representatives election
Party	Candidate	Votes	%
Democratic	Jewell Jones	23,731	65.05
Republican	Robert Pope	12,749	34.95
Total votes		36,480	100
Democratic hold			

2016 Michigan House of Representatives 11th district special election
Party	Candidate	Votes	%
Democratic	Lauren Plawecki	24,020	65.79
Republican	Robert Pope	10,905	29.87
U.S. Taxpayers'	Marc Joseph Sosnowski	1,586	4.34
Total votes		36,511	100
Democratic hold			

2014 Michigan House of Representatives election
Party	Candidate	Votes	%
Democratic	Julie Plawecki	16,252	69.81
Republican	Jim Rhoades	7,027	30.19
Total votes		23,279	100
Democratic hold			

2012 Michigan House of Representatives election
Party	Candidate	Votes	%
Democratic	David Knezek	27,626	71.75
Republican	Kathleen Kopczyk	10,875	28.25
Total votes		38,501	100
Democratic hold			

2010 Michigan House of Representatives election
Party	Candidate	Votes	%
Democratic	David E. Nathan (incumbent)	16,272	97.09
Republican	Leonard Mier	488	2.91
Total votes		16,760	100
Democratic hold			

=== 2000s ===
2008 Michigan House of Representatives election
Party	Candidate	Votes	%
Democratic	David E. Nathan	30,801	96.93
Republican	Leonard Mier	974	3.07
Total votes		31,775	100
Democratic hold			

2006 Michigan House of Representatives election
Party	Candidate	Votes	%
Democratic	Morris W. Hood, III (incumbent)	21,494	99.96
Write-In	Nathaniel M. Smith Jr.	9	0.04
Total votes		21,503	100
Democratic hold			

2004 Michigan House of Representatives election
Party	Candidate	Votes	%
Democratic	Morris W. Hood, III (incumbent)	30,172	95.72
Republican	Charles E. Powell, Jr.	1,348	4.28
Total votes		31,520	100
Democratic hold			

2002 Michigan House of Representatives election
Party	Candidate	Votes	%
Democratic	Morris W. Hood, III	19,906	94.7
Republican	Charles E. Powell, Jr.	888	4.22
Green	Garry Herring	227	1.08
Total votes			100
Democratic hold			

2000 Michigan House of Representatives election
Party	Candidate	Votes	%
Democratic	Irma Clark (incumbent)	23,296	93.86
Republican	Charles E. Powell, Jr.	1,524	6.14
Total votes		24,820	100
Democratic hold			

=== 1990s ===
1998 Michigan House of Representatives election
Party	Candidate	Votes	%
Democratic	Irma Clark	18,049	93.07
Republican	Raquel Reardon	1,344	6.93
Total votes		19,393	100
Democratic hold			
