= LaTanya Garrett =

American politician

Member of the Michigan House of Representatives from the 7th district
- In office January 1, 2015 – January 1, 2021
- Preceded by: Thomas Stallworth III
- Succeeded by: Helena Scott

Personal details
- Party: Democratic
- Education: Wayne County Community College
- Website: Official website

LaTanya Garrett is a Democratic politician from Michigan currently representing the 7th District in the Michigan House of Representatives after being elected in November 2014.

== Education and early career ==
Garrett attended schools in the Detroit area, and graduated from Henry Ford High School, Life Support Training Institute, and Wayne County Community College. As of January 2015, she is finalizing a bachelor's degree in medical case management from Davenport University.

Garrett has worked as a community activist and on several political campaigns. She has also worked as a licensed first responder, and is a small business owner.

== Political career ==
Garrett was elected to the Michigan House of Representatives in 2014. She took office in January 2015, and was asked by Democratic Floor Leader Sam Singh to serve as one of his Assistant Democratic Floor Leaders. State Rep. LaTanya Garrett, a wife and mother of three, said her family was top of mind when she wrote legislation introduced in the Michigan Legislature on Wednesday that would make it a felony to falsely report a crime based on a person’s race. Committees (2015-2016)

- Agriculture
- Energy
- Commerce and Trade

== Personal life ==
Garrett is married with two children. Garrett is a resident of Detroit, Michigan.
