= David Nathan (politician) =

American politician from Michigan

David E. Nathan

Member of the Michigan House of Representatives from the 11th district
- In office January 2009 – January 2013
- Preceded by: Morris Hood III
- Succeeded by: David Knezek

Member of the Michigan House of Representatives from the 8th district
- In office January 2013 – January 2015
- Preceded by: Thomas Stallworth III
- Succeeded by: Sherry Gay-Dagnogo

Personal details
- Born: Detroit, Michigan
- Spouse: Leslie Nathan
- Children: 4
- Occupation: Politician

David Nathan is a former member of the Michigan House of Representatives first elected in 2008. He represented part of Detroit.

== Early life ==
Nathan was born in Detroit, Michigan.

== Career ==
Nathan owns a real estate business.

On November 4, 2008, Nathan won the election and became a Democratic member of Michigan House of Representatives for District 11. Nathan defeated Leonard A. Mier Jr. with 96.93% of the votes. On November 2, 2010, as an incumbent, Nathan won the election and continued serving District 11. Nathan defeated Leonard Mier with 97.09% of the votes. On November 6, 2012, Nathan won the election and became a Democratic member of Michigan House of Representatives for District 8. Nathan defeated David Porter with 96.92% of the votes.

In 2014 he ran unsuccessfully for State Senate, losing in the Democratic primary to David Knezek.

== Personal life ==
Nathan's wife is Adrienne Nathan. They have five children. Nathan and his family live in Detroit, Michigan.
