= Lauren Plawecki =

American politician from Michigan

Member of the Michigan House of Representatives from the 11th district
- In office November 29, 2016 – January 1, 2017
- Preceded by: Julie Plawecki
- Succeeded by: Jewell Jones

Personal details
- Born: 1994 (age 31–32) Detroit, Michigan, U.S.
- Party: Democratic
- Parent(s): Julie and Mark Plawecki
- Education: University of Michigan (B.A. 2015)
- Website: Official website

Lauren Plawecki (born 1994) is an American politician from Michigan who represented the 11th District—which comprises the cities of Garden City and Inkster, and parts of Dearborn Heights, Livonia and Westland—in the Michigan House of Representatives after being elected in November 2016 in a special election to fill the remaining two months of the term left vacant by the death of her mother, Julie Plawecki.

== Early life and education ==
Plawecki is a graduate of Divine Child High School in Dearborn, Michigan, and the University of Michigan with a degree in Art History and has worked or interned at museums all over the world, including the Palazzo Vecchio in Florence, the Guggenheim Museum in New York City and the Norton Simon Museum in California.

== Career ==
Plawecki had never planned on following her mother's footsteps by entering politics. On June 25, 2016, Julie Plawecki was hiking out in Oregon when she suddenly collapsed. Attempts to revive her proved unsuccessful and she was then pronounced dead. It is presumed she suffered a heart attack.

Gov. Rick Snyder called a special election on July 5, 2016, to fill the remainder of Plawecki's term, with the special primary taking place August 30 and the special general election to take place alongside the regularly scheduled general election on November 8, 2016. On July 6, 2016, Lauren was one of 11 Democrats that filed to be the Democratic nominee for her late mother's seat in the 2016 general election. Since Rep. Plawecki was slated to face no Democratic opposition in the August 2 primary, Democratic precinct delegates in the 11th House district would select the Democratic nominee for the November 8 general election. On July 7, 2016, Lauren Plawecki was not chosen to replace her mother. Inkster City Councilman Jewell Jones, who at 20-years-old became the youngest ever Inkster City Councilman and is an undergraduate student at the University of Michigan–Dearborn, was chosen and ran unopposed in the Democratic primary on August 2.

Despite not being chosen to run for the full two-year term, Lauren filed to run to finish her mother's remaining term. Since she was the lone Democrat to file for the seat (along with only one Republican filing for the seat, Robert Pope, an 85-year-old retired sheriff's deputy who was also running for the full two-year term against Jones), a primary was not necessary. Lauren won the special election, taking 65 percent of the vote and was sworn-in as a state representative on November 29, 2016.

== Electoral history ==
Michigan's 11th state House of Representatives District special General Election, 2016
Party	Candidate	Votes	%	±%
Democratic	Lauren Plawecki	24,020	65.8	N/A
Republican	Robert E. Pope	10,905	29.9	N/A
U.S. Taxpayers	Marc J. Sosnowski	1,586	4.3	N/A
Democratic hold				
