= Sherry Gay-Dagnogo =

American politician (born 1967)

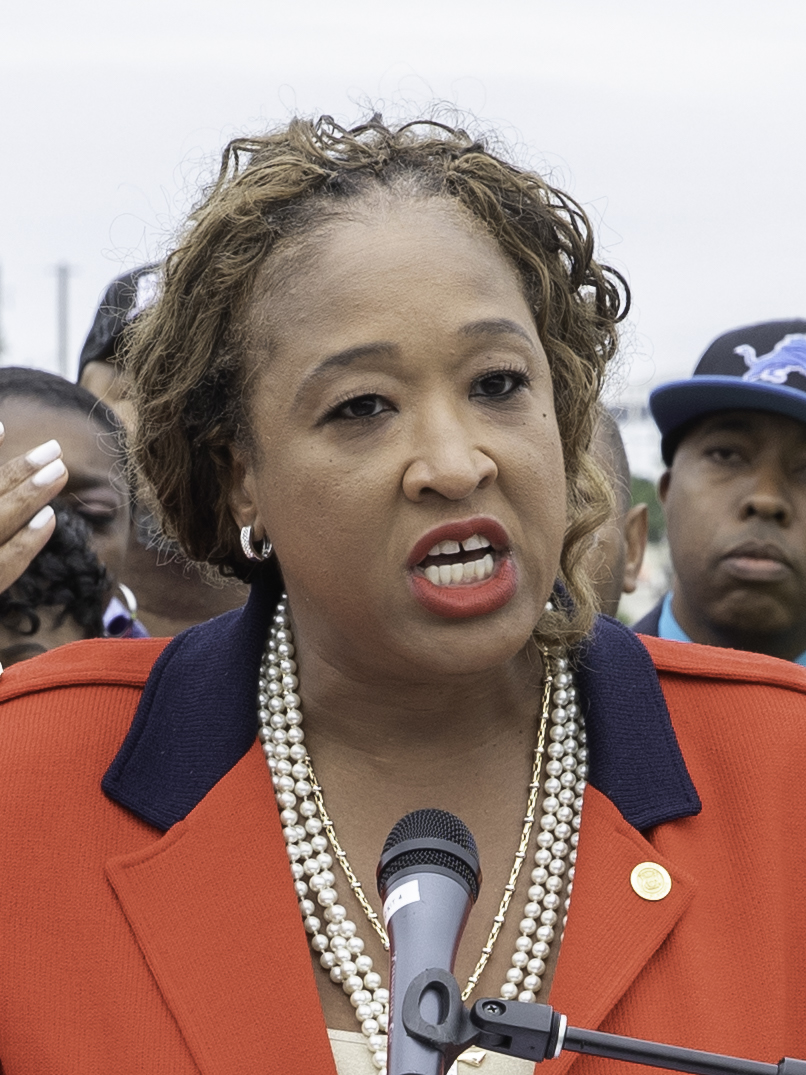

Member of the Michigan House of Representatives from the 8th district
- In office January 1, 2015 – January 1, 2021
- Preceded by: David Nathan
- Succeeded by: Stephanie A. Young

Personal details
- Born: January 30, 1967 (age 59) Detroit, Michigan, U.S.
- Party: Democratic
- Children: 1
- Education: Wayne State University (BS, MEd)
- Website: Campaign website

Sherry J. Gay-Dagnogo (born January 30, 1967) is a current Detroit School Board Member elected citywide and a former Democratic member of the Michigan House of Representatives who represented the 8th District. The 8th House District includes portions of Northwest Detroit, including the Bethune, Brightmoor, Castle Rouge, College Park, and Grandmont-Rosedale communities. In January 2020, Gay-Dagnogo announced that she was forming a political committee to explore the possibility of running for Mayor of Detroit in 2021.

== Personal life ==
Gay-Dagnogo is former Vice President, of the North Rosedale Park Civic Association.

In 2019, a house owned by Gay-Dagnogo was professionally demolished without her permission and without planning permission. The circumstances surrounding the demolition were initially unclear. Gay-Dagnogo had previously sought quotes from local contractors concerning a potential demolition, but decided to renovate it instead. In October, construction debris from the house were discovered in a landfill in Wayne County, twenty-one miles away from the location of the house. A few days later, the owner of a local trucking company self-identified as the responsible party.

== Political career ==
As of 2018, Gay-Dagnogo has not sponsored a bill that has been signed into law.

Incumbent State Rep. David Nathan defeated Gay-Dagnogo in the 2012 House District 8 Primary Election for the Michigan House of Representatives. Gay-Dagnogo was re-elected in 2014 and 2016.

In 2018, Gay-Dagnogo ran for the House of Representatives after John Conyers Jr. resigned in December 2017 amid allegations of sexual harassment. She later withdrew.

During a reception celebrating Black History Month in February 2020, Gay-Dagnogo lobbied President Donald Trump to grant clemency to Kwame Kilpatrick. Kilpatrick, former mayor of Detroit, was convicted of extortion, bribery, and conspiracy in 2013 and sentenced to 18 years in prison.

== Electoral history ==
2012 Michigan 8th House District Primary Election
Party	Candidate	Votes	%
Democratic	David Nathan	4,790	45
Democratic	Sherry Gay-Dagnogo	3,647	34
Democratic	Taryn Jones	1,162	10
Democratic	Mia Grillier	1,064	9

2014 Michigan 8th House District Primary Election
Party	Candidate	Votes	%
Democratic	Sherry Gay-Dagnogo	4,318	45
Democratic	Stacy Pugh	2,674	28
Democratic	Muhsin Muhammad	793	8
Democratic	Nichole Hampton	760	8
Democratic	Mia Grillier	696	7
Democratic	Cyrus Wheeler	254	2

2014 Michigan 8th House District General Election
Party	Candidate	Votes	%
Democratic	Sherry Gay-Dagnogo	23,008	96
Republican	Christopher Ewald	770	3

2016 Michigan 8th House District General Election
Party	Candidate	Votes	%
Democratic	Sherry Gay-Dagnogo	33,270	95
Republican	Jennifer Rynicki	1,470	4

Michigan's 13th Congressial district Democratic primary, 2022
Party	Candidate	Votes	%
Democratic	Shri Thanedar	22,314	28.3
Democratic	Adam Hollier	18,517	23.5
Democratic	Portia Roberson	13,318	16.9
Democratic	John Conyers III	6,778	8.6
Democratic	Sherry Gay-Dagnogo	6,440	8.2
Democratic	Sharon McPhail	5,043	6.4
Democratic	Michael Griffie	3,636	4.6
Democratic	Sam Riddle	1,841	2.3
Democratic	Lorrie Rutledge	916	1.2
Write-in		6	0.0
Total votes		78,809	100.0

== See also ==
- Michigan House of Representatives
- Michigan Democratic Party
