= Julie Plawecki =

American politician (1961–2016)

Member of the Michigan House of Representatives from the 11th district
- In office January 1, 2015 – June 25, 2016
- Preceded by: David Knezek
- Succeeded by: Lauren Plawecki

Personal details
- Born: August 27, 1961 Detroit, Michigan, U.S.
- Died: June 25, 2016 (aged 54) Smith Rock State Park, Oregon, U.S.
- Party: Democratic
- Spouse: Mark Plawecki
- Children: 3, including Lauren Plawecki
- Education: Oakland University
- Website: Official website

Julie Plawecki (August 27, 1961 – June 25, 2016) was an American politician from Michigan who represented the 11th District—which comprises the cities of Garden City and Inkster, and parts of Dearborn Heights, Livonia and Westland—in the Michigan House of Representatives after being elected in November 2014 for the Democratic Party.

== Biography ==
Plawecki attended Warren Public Schools and Michigan State University. She received a Bachelor of Science degree from Oakland University with a dual major in chemistry and general science, and obtained her professional teaching certificate from the University of Michigan-Dearborn. Plawecki lived in Dearborn Heights with her husband, Mark Plawecki, where they raised their three daughters.

A former medical technologist, Plawecki taught science, math, and religion at both the secondary and elementary school levels. Prior to her election, she worked at St. Robert Bellarmine, a Catholic school in Redford, and also coached the school’s Science Olympiad team. She was a member of the National Science Teachers Association and the Detroit Area Council of Teachers of Mathematics.

In the 2014 Michigan House of Representatives elections, Plawecki successfully ran for the seat to represent Michigan's 11th House of Representatives district. Her eldest daughter, a 2012 Michigan State University graduate and 2015 Masters candidate at Yale University, forwent a summer’s paid internship at Yale to become manager of Plawecki's campaign.

Plawecki died on June 25, 2016, while hiking in Smith Rock State Park in Oregon with her daughters. She was hiking and suddenly collapsed—attempts to revive her proved unsuccessful and she was then pronounced dead. It is presumed she suffered a heart attack. Her daughter Lauren Plawecki later won a special election to finish her term in the state legislature.

== Electoral history ==
Michigan's 11th state House of Representatives District General Election, 2014
Party	Candidate	Votes	%	±%
Democratic	Julie Plawecki	16,252	69.8	−2.0
Republican	Jim Rhoades	7,027	30.2	+2.0
Democratic hold				
