= Marleau =

Marleau is a surname. Notable people with the surname include:

- Jim Marleau (born 1947), American politician
- Louise Marleau (born 1944), Canadian actress
- Marie-Ève Marleau (born 1982), Canadian diver
- Patrick Marleau (born 1979), retired Canadian ice hockey player
- Robert Marleau, Canadian civil servant

== See also ==
- Capitaine Marleau French television series
