= Michigan's 64th House of Representatives district =

American legislative district

Michigan's 64th State House of Representatives district
Representative
Joseph G. Pavlov; R–Kimball Township
- Demographics: 87% White; 3.1% Black; 4.6% Hispanic; 0.6% Asian; 0.1% Native American; 0.4% Other; 4.3% Multiracial
- Population (2024): 90,521

Michigan's 64th House of Representatives district (also referred to as Michigan's 64th House district) is a legislative district within the Michigan House of Representatives located in part of Sanilac and St. Clair counties. The district was created in 1965, when the Michigan House of Representatives district naming scheme changed from a county-based system to a numerical one.

== List of representatives ==
Representative	Party	Dates	Residence	Notes
Raymond L. Baker	Republican	1965–1974	Farmington	
Wilbur Brotherton	Republican	1975–1982	Farmington	
Maxine Berman	Democratic	1983–1992	Southfield	
Michael J. Griffin	Democratic	1993–1998	Jackson	
Clark Bisbee	Republican	1999–2004	Jackson	
Rick Baxter	Republican	2005–2006	Concord	
Martin Griffin	Democratic	2007–2010	Jackson	
Earl Poleski	Republican	2011–2016	Jackson	
Julie Alexander	Republican	2017–2022	Hanover	
Andrew Beeler	Republican	2023–2024	Fort Gratiot	
Joseph Pavlov	Republican	2025–present	Kimball Township	

== Recent elections ==
=== 2020s ===
2026 Michigan House of Representatives election
Party	Candidate	Votes	%
Republican	Joseph G. Pavlov (incumbent)	24,856	59.6
Democratic	Ken Heuvelman	16,847	40.4
Total votes		41,703	100
Republican hold			

2024 Michigan House of Representatives election
Party	Candidate	Votes	%
Republican	Joseph G. Pavlov	29,808	61.0
Democratic	John Anter	19,026	39.0
Total votes		48,834	100
Republican hold			

2022 Michigan House of Representatives election
Party	Candidate	Votes	%
Republican	Andrew Beeler	23,216	61.3
Democratic	Charles Howell	14,653	38.7
Total votes		37,869	100
Republican hold			

2020 Michigan House of Representatives election
Party	Candidate	Votes	%
Republican	Julie Alexander	24,880	60.6
Democratic	Sandra Hofman-Kingston	15,125	36.8
Libertarian	Norman Peterson	1,071	2.6
Total votes		41,076	100
Republican hold			

2018 Michigan House of Representatives election
Party	Candidate	Votes	%
Republican	Julie Alexander	18,050	57.8
Democratic	Sheila Troxel	12,470	39.9
Libertarian	Norman Peterson	736	2.4
Total votes		31,256	100
Republican hold			

2016 Michigan House of Representatives election
Party	Candidate	Votes	%
Republican	Julie Alexander	22,426	62.5
Democratic	Ronald Brooks	13,443	37.5
Total votes		35,829	100
Republican hold			

2014 Michigan House of Representatives election
Party	Candidate	Votes	%
Republican	Earl Poleski	13,617	61.1
Democratic	Brenda Pilgrim	8,666	38.9
Total votes		22,283	100
Republican hold			

2012 Michigan House of Representatives election
Party	Candidate	Votes	%
Republican	Earl Poleski	20,190	56.2
Democratic	Barbara Shelton	15,729	43.8
Total votes		35,919	100
Republican hold			

2010 Michigan House of Representatives election
Party	Candidate	Votes	%
Republican	Earl Poleski	13,186	58.6
Democratic	Martin Griffin	9,318	41.4
Total votes		22,504	100
Republican gain from Democratic			

2008 Michigan House of Representatives election
Party	Candidate	Votes	%
Democratic	Martin Griffin	24,260	62.7
Republican	Leland Prebble	14,454	37.3
Total votes		38,714	100
Democratic hold			

== Historical district boundaries ==
Map	Description	Apportionment Plan	Notes
	Oakland County (part): Farmington; Farmington Township; Keego Harbor; Lathrup Village; Orchard Lake Village; Southfield (part); West Bloomfield Township	1964 Apportionment Plan	
	Oakland County (part): Farmington; Farmington Township; Southfield (part)	1972 Apportionment Plan	
	Oakland County (part): Lathrup Village; Southfield	1982 Apportionment Plan	
	Jackson County (part): Blackman Township; Jackson; Summit Township	1992 Apportionment Plan	
	Jackson County (part): Concord Township; Hanover Township; Jackson; Napoleon Township; Parma Township; Pulaski Township; Sandstone Township; Spring Arbor Township; Summit Township	2001 Apportionment Plan	
	Jackson County (part): Concord Township; Hanover Township; Jackson; Napoleon Township; Parma Township; Pulaski Township; Sandstone Township; Spring Arbor Township; Summit Township	2011 Apportionment Plan	
