= Julie Alexander (politician) =

American politician (born 1962)

Member of the Michigan House of Representatives from the 64th district
- Incumbent
- Assumed office January 1, 2017
- Preceded by: Earl Poleski

Personal details
- Born: November 23, 1962 Saginaw, Michigan
- Party: Republican
- Spouse: Jeff Alexander
- Education: Western Michigan University
- Profession: Teacher, farmer

Julie Alexander (born November 23, 1962) is a current member of the Michigan House of Representatives from the 64th District. The 64th District comprises the City of Jackson, along with the townships of Concord, Hanover, Napoleon, Pulaski, Sandstone, Spring Arbor and Summit.

== Biography ==
Before serving as a representative, Alexander served as a middle school teacher for nine years and an adult education teacher for thirteen years. Alexander also served three terms on the Jackson County Board of Commissioners.

Alexander and her husband currently operate a third-generation farm in Hanover, Michigan.

== Electoral history ==
2016 2016 64th District Primary
| Party | Candidate | Votes | % |
|---|---|---|---|
| Republican | Julie Alexander | 3,479 | 42.3% |
| Republican | Phillip Tripp | 2,491 | 30.3% |
| Republican | John Griffin | 2,256 | 27.4% |
| Majority | | 988 | 12% |

2016 2016 64th District Michigan House Election
| Party | Candidate | Votes | % | ±% |
|---|---|---|---|---|
| Republican | Julie Alexander | 22,426 | 68.2% | +7.1% |
| democratic Party (United States) | Ron Brooks | 13,433 | 37.5% | -1.5% |
| Majority | | 8,993 | 30.7% | +8.7% |
| Republican hold |
