= 2024 Michigan House of Representatives election =

- November 5, 2024

All 110 seats in the Michigan House of Representatives 56 seats needed for a majority
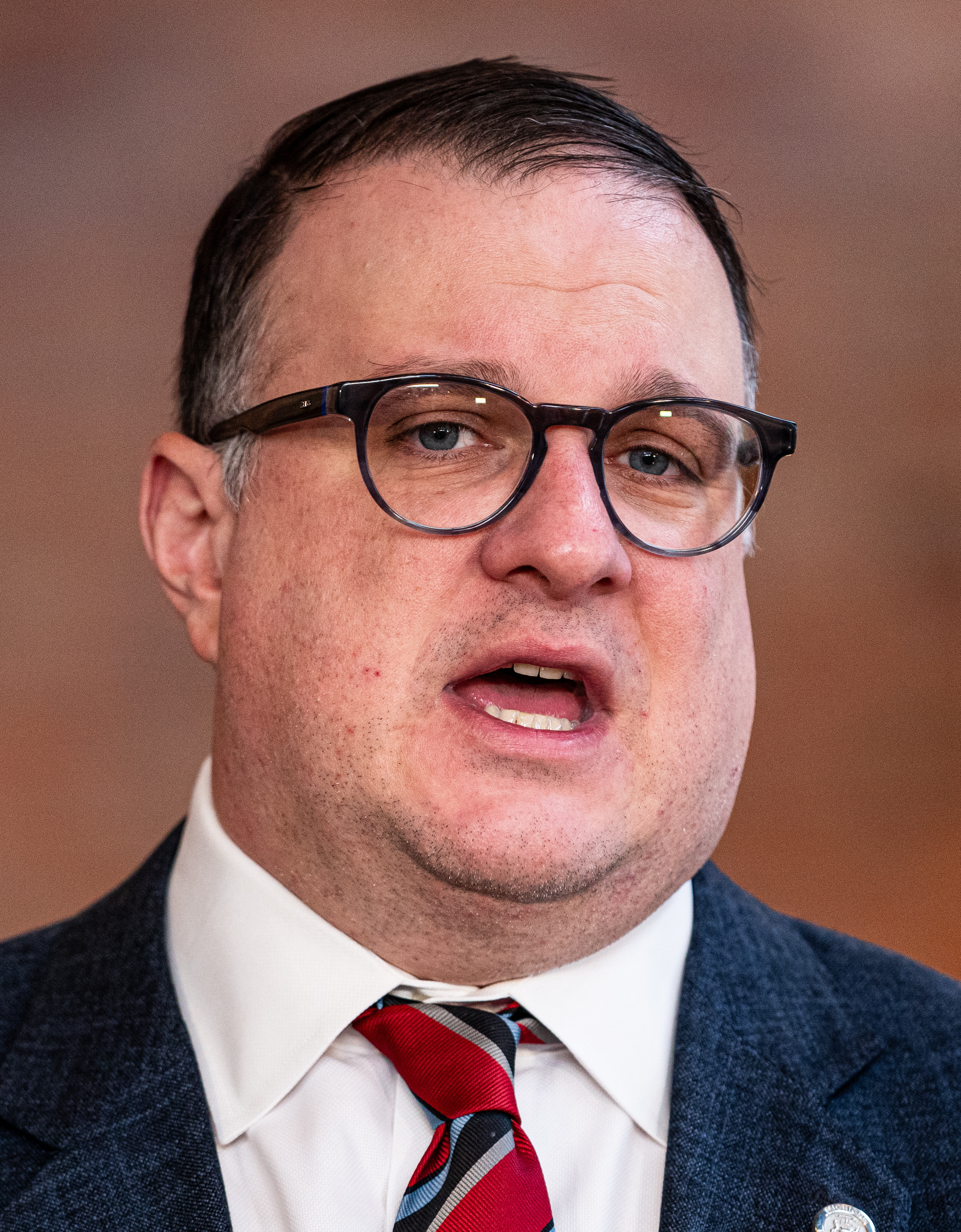

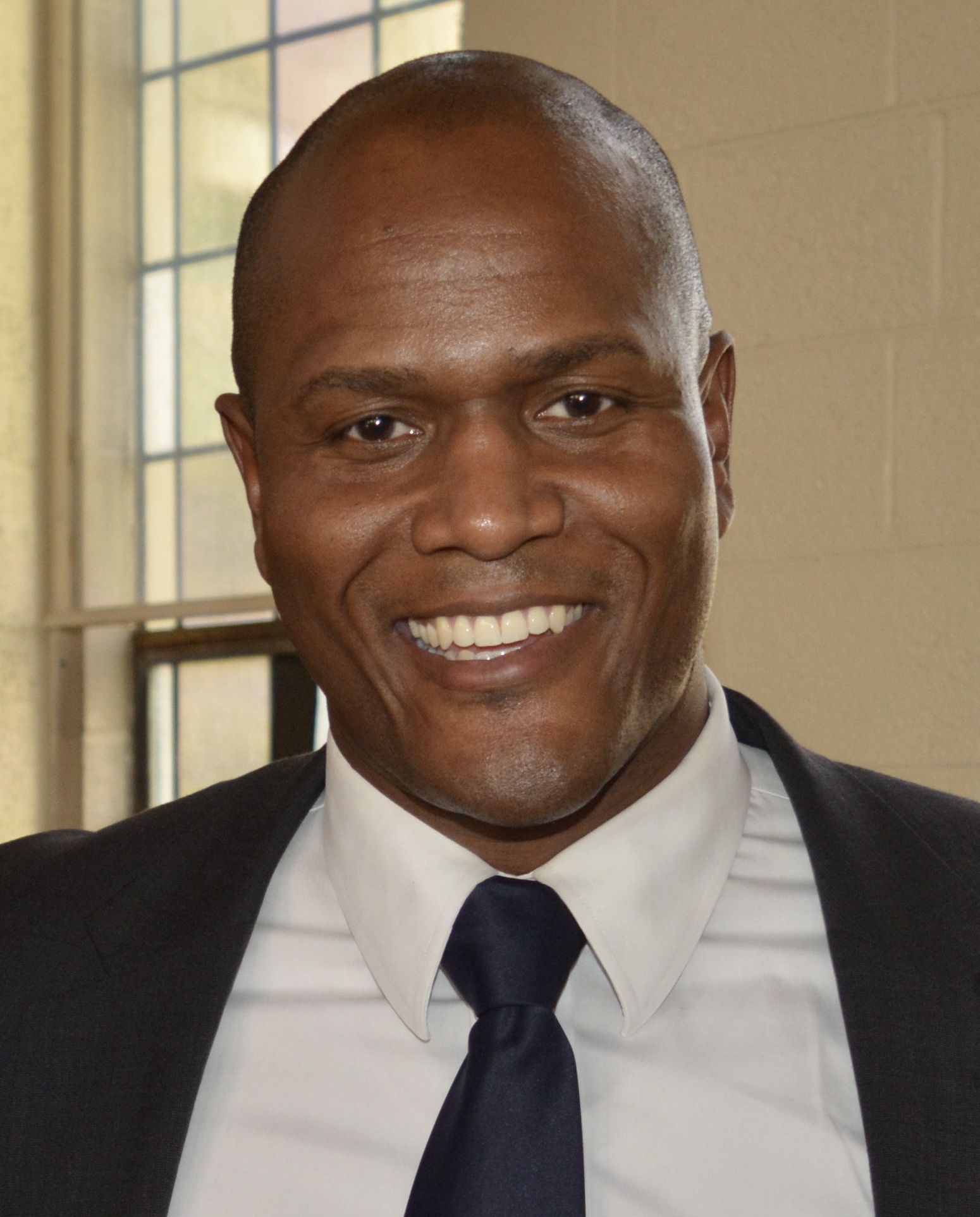
| | Majority party | Minority party |
|---|---|---|
| Leader | Matt Hall | Joe Tate |
| Party | Republican | Democratic |
| Leader since | January 11, 2023 | January 1, 2023 |
| Leader's seat | 42nd–Richland Township | 9th (Note: Redistricted from the 10th district.)–Detroit |
| Last election | 54 seats, 49.23% | 56 seats, 50.56% |
| Seats after | 58 | 52 |
| Seat change | ▲4 | ▼4 |
| Popular vote | 2,773,258 | 2,636,046 |
| Percentage | 51.04% | 48.52% |
| Swing | ▲1.81% | ▼2.04% |
- Democratic hold Republican hold Republican gain Democratic: 50–60% 60–70% 70–80% 80–90% >90% Republican: 50–60% 60–70% 70–80%
Speaker before election
Joe Tate
Democratic
Elected Speaker
Matt Hall
Republican

The 2024 Michigan House of Representatives election was held on November 5, 2024, alongside the 2024 United States presidential election.

All 110 seats in the Michigan House of Representatives were elected.

== Predictions ==
| Source | Ranking | As of |
|---|---|---|
| CNalysis | Lean D | June 15, 2024 |

== Background ==
Districts in yellow were redrawn prior to the 2024 election

Following the redistricting which proceeded the 2020 United States census, the 2022 Michigan House of Representatives election saw the Democrats reclaim a majority in the chamber of 56 to 54. The state house was previously under Republican control. The Democratic Party had also won the majority of the state senate in a simultaneous election.

In 2023, a panel of judges on the United States District Court for the Western District of Michigan ordered a redraw of seven Detroit-area seats in the House as unlawful racial gerrymanders. The seats were redrawn before the 2024 election.

== Results ==
The Democrats lost their majority, with the Republicans winning 58 seats, four of them flipped from Democrat to Republican.

| Party | Candi- dates | Votes | | Seats | |
| Party | Candi- dates | No. | % | No. | +/– |
|---|---|---|---|---|---|
| Republican Party | 109 | 2,773,258 | 51.04% | 58 | ▲4 |
| Democratic Party | 110 | 2,636,046 | 48.52% | 52 | ▼4 |
| Working Class Party | 6 | 10,184 | 0.19% | 0 | Steady |
| Libertarian Party | 5 | 5,092 | 0.09% | 0 | Steady |
| Green Party | 4 | 4,711 | 0.09% | 0 | Steady |
| Independent | 1 | 3,800 | 0.07% | 0 | Steady |
| Write-ins | 1 | 187 | 0.00% | 0 | Steady |
| Total | 236 | 5,433,278 | 100.00% | 110 | Steady |

== Retirements ==
=== Democrats ===
1. District 7: Abraham Aiyash (Note: Redistricted from the 9th District.) retired.
2. District 33: Felicia Brabec retired.
3. District 40: Christine Morse retired to run for 9th Circuit Court.
4. District 81: Rachel Hood retired.

=== Republicans ===
1. District 34: Dale Zorn was term-limited.
2. District 35: Andrew Fink retired to run for Supreme Court.
3. District 64: Andrew Beeler retired.
4. District 93: Graham Filler retired.

== Incumbents defeated ==
=== In primary election ===
Two incumbent representatives, both Republicans, were defeated in the August 6 primary election.

==== Republicans ====
1. District 50: Bob Bezotte lost renomination to Jason Woolford.
2. District 107: Neil Friske lost renomination to Parker Fairbairn.

=== In general election ===
Four incumbent representatives, all Democrats, were defeated.

==== Democrats ====
1. District 27: Jaime Churches lost reelection to Rylee Linting
2. District 44: Jim Haadsma lost reelection to Steve Frisbie
3. District 58: Nate Shannon lost reelection to Ron Robinson
4. District 109: Jenn Hill lost reelection to Karl Bohnak

== Summary of results by district ==
Italics denote an open seat held by the incumbent party; bold text denotes a gain for a party.

| State House District | Incumbent | Party | Elected Representative | Outcome |
|---|---|---|---|---|
| 1 | Tyrone Carter | Dem | Tyrone Carter | Dem Hold |
| 2 | Tullio Liberati | Dem | Tullio Liberati | Dem Hold |
| 3 | Alabas Farhat | Dem | Alabas Farhat | Dem Hold |
| 4 | Karen Whitsett | Dem | Karen Whitsett | Dem Hold |
| 5 | Natalie Price (Note: Redistricted from district 5 to district 6.) | Dem | Regina Weiss (Note: Redistricted from district 6 to district 5.) | Dem Hold |
| 6 | Regina Weiss | Dem | Natalie Price | Dem Hold |
| 7 | Helena Scott (Note: Redistricted from district 7 to district 8.) | Dem | Tonya Myers Phillips | Dem Hold |
| 8 | Mike McFall (Note: Redistricted from district 8 to district 14.) | Dem | Helena Scott | Dem Hold |
| 9 | Abraham Aiyash (Note: Redistricted from district 9 to district 7, then retired.) | Dem | Joe Tate (Note: Redistricted from district 10 to district 9.) | Dem Hold |
| 10 | Joe Tate | Dem | Veronica Paiz (Note: Redistricted from district 11 to district 10.) | Dem Hold |
| 11 | Veronica Paiz | Dem | Donavan McKinney (Note: Redistricted from district 14 to district 11.) | Dem Hold |
| 12 | Kimberly Edwards | Dem | Kimberly Edwards | Dem Hold |
| 13 | Mai Xiong | Dem | Mai Xiong | Dem Hold |
| 14 | Donavan McKinney | Dem | Mike McFall | Dem Hold |
| 15 | Erin Byrnes | Dem | Erin Byrnes | Dem Hold |
| 16 | Stephanie Young | Dem | Stephanie Young | Dem Hold |
| 17 | Laurie Pohutsky | Dem | Laurie Pohutsky | Dem Hold |
| 18 | Jason Hoskins | Dem | Jason Hoskins | Dem Hold |
| 19 | Samantha Steckloff | Dem | Samantha Steckloff | Dem Hold |
| 20 | Noah Arbit | Dem | Noah Arbit | Dem Hold |
| 21 | Kelly Breen | Dem | Kelly Breen | Dem Hold |
| 22 | Matt Koleszar | Dem | Matt Koleszar | Dem Hold |
| 23 | Jason Morgan | Dem | Jason Morgan | Dem Hold |
| 24 | Ranjeev Puri | Dem | Ranjeev Puri | Dem Hold |
| 25 | Peter Herzberg | Dem | Peter Herzberg | Dem Hold |
| 26 | Dylan Wegela | Dem | Dylan Wegela | Dem Hold |
| 27 | Jaime Churches | Dem | **Rylee Linting** | **Rep Gain** |
| 28 | Jamie Thompson | Rep | Jamie Thompson | Rep Hold |
| 29 | James DeSana | Rep | James DeSana | Rep Hold |
| 30 | William Bruck | Rep | William Bruck | Rep Hold |
| 31 | Reggie Miller | Dem | Reggie Miller | Dem Hold |
| 32 | Jimmie Wilson Jr. | Dem | Jimmie Wilson Jr. | Dem Hold |
| 33 | Felicia Brabec | Dem | Morgan Foreman | Dem Hold |
| 34 | Dale Zorn | Rep | Nancy Jenkins-Arno | Rep Hold |
| 35 | Andrew Fink | Rep | Jennifer Wortz | Rep Hold |
| 36 | Steve Carra | Rep | Steve Carra | Rep Hold |
| 37 | Brad Paquette | Rep | Brad Paquette | Rep Hold |
| 38 | Joey Andrews | Dem | Joey Andrews | Dem Hold |
| 39 | Pauline Wendzel | Rep | Pauline Wendzel | Rep Hold |
| 40 | Christine Morse | Dem | Matt Longjohn | Dem Hold |
| 41 | Julie Rogers | Dem | Julie Rogers | Dem Hold |
| 42 | Matt Hall | Rep | Matt Hall | Rep Hold |
| 43 | Rachelle Smit | Rep | Rachelle Smit | Rep Hold |
| 44 | Jim Haadsma | Dem | **Steve Frisbie** | **Rep Gain** |
| 45 | Sarah Lightner | Rep | Sarah Lightner | Rep Hold |
| 46 | Kathy Schmaltz | Rep | Kathy Schmaltz | Rep Hold |
| 47 | Carrie Rheingans | Dem | Carrie Rheingans | Dem Hold |
| 48 | Jennifer Conlin | Dem | Jennifer Conlin | Dem Hold |
| 49 | Ann Bollin | Rep | Ann Bollin | Rep Hold |
| 50 | Bob Bezotte | Rep | Jason Woolford | Rep Hold |
| 51 | Matt Maddock | Rep | Matt Maddock | Rep Hold |
| 52 | Mike Harris | Rep | Mike Harris | Rep Hold |
| 53 | Brenda Carter | Dem | Brenda Carter | Dem Hold |
| 54 | Donni Steele | Rep | Donni Steele | Rep Hold |
| 55 | Mark Tisdel | Rep | Mark Tisdel | Rep Hold |
| 56 | Sharon MacDonell | Dem | Sharon MacDonell | Dem Hold |
| 57 | Thomas E. Kuhn | Rep | Thomas E. Kuhn | Rep Hold |
| 58 | Nate Shannon | Dem | **Ron Robinson** | **Rep Gain** |
| 59 | Doug Wozniak | Rep | Doug Wozniak | Rep Hold |
| 60 | Joseph Aragona | Rep | Joseph Aragona | Rep Hold |
| 61 | Denise Mentzer | Dem | Denise Mentzer | Dem Hold |
| 62 | Alicia St. Germaine | Rep | Alicia St. Germaine | Rep Hold |
| 63 | Jay DeBoyer | Rep | Jay DeBoyer | Rep Hold |
| 64 | Andrew Beeler | Rep | Joseph G. Pavlov | Rep Hold |
| 65 | Jaime Greene | Rep | Jaime Greene | Rep Hold |
| 66 | Josh Schriver | Rep | Josh Schriver | Rep Hold |
| 67 | Phil Green | Rep | Phil Green | Rep Hold |
| 68 | David Martin | Rep | David Martin | Rep Hold |
| 69 | Jasper Martus | Dem | Jasper Martus | Dem Hold |
| 70 | Cynthia Neeley | Dem | Cynthia Neeley | Dem Hold |
| 71 | Brian BeGole | Rep | Brian BeGole | Rep Hold |
| 72 | Mike Mueller | Rep | Mike Mueller | Rep Hold |
| 73 | Julie Brixie | Dem | Julie Brixie | Dem Hold |
| 74 | Kara Hope | Dem | Kara Hope | Dem Hold |
| 75 | Penelope Tsernoglou | Dem | Penelope Tsernoglou | Dem Hold |
| 76 | Angela Witwer | Dem | Angela Witwer | Dem Hold |
| 77 | Emily Dievendorf | Dem | Emily Dievendorf | Dem Hold |
| 78 | Gina Johnsen | Rep | Gina Johnsen | Rep Hold |
| 79 | Angela Rigas | Rep | Angela Rigas | Rep Hold |
| 80 | Phil Skaggs | Dem | Phil Skaggs | Dem Hold |
| 81 | Rachel Hood | Dem | Stephen Wooden | Dem Hold |
| 82 | Kristian Grant | Dem | Kristian Grant | Dem Hold |
| 83 | John Fitzgerald | Dem | John Fitzgerald | Dem Hold |
| 84 | Carol Glanville | Dem | Carol Glanville | Dem Hold |
| 85 | Bradley Slagh | Rep | Bradley Slagh | Rep Hold |
| 86 | Nancy De Boer | Rep | Nancy De Boer | Rep Hold |
| 87 | Will Snyder | Dem | Will Snyder | Dem Hold |
| 88 | Greg VanWoerkom | Rep | Greg VanWoerkom | Rep Hold |
| 89 | Luke Meerman | Rep | Luke Meerman | Rep Hold |
| 90 | Bryan Posthumus | Rep | Bryan Posthumus | Rep Hold |
| 91 | Pat Outman | Rep | Pat Outman | Rep Hold |
| 92 | Jerry Neyer | Rep | Jerry Neyer | Rep Hold |
| 93 | Graham Filler | Rep | Tim Kelly | Rep Hold |
| 94 | Amos O'Neal | Dem | Amos O'Neal | Dem Hold |
| 95 | Bill G. Schuette | Rep | Bill G. Schuette | Rep Hold |
| 96 | Timothy Beson | Rep | Timothy Beson | Rep Hold |
| 97 | Matthew Bierlein | Rep | Matthew Bierlein | Rep Hold |
| 98 | Gregory Alexander | Rep | Gregory Alexander | Rep Hold |
| 99 | Mike Hoadley | Rep | Mike Hoadley | Rep Hold |
| 100 | Tom Kunse | Rep | Tom Kunse | Rep Hold |
| 101 | Joseph Fox | Rep | Joseph Fox | Rep Hold |
| 102 | Curt VanderWall | Rep | Curt VanderWall | Rep Hold |
| 103 | Betsy Coffia | Dem | Betsy Coffia | Dem Hold |
| 104 | John Roth | Rep | John Roth | Rep Hold |
| 105 | Ken Borton | Rep | Ken Borton | Rep Hold |
| 106 | Cam Cavitt | Rep | Cam Cavitt | Rep Hold |
| 107 | Neil Friske | Rep | Parker Fairbairn | Rep Hold |
| 108 | David Prestin | Rep | David Prestin | Rep Hold |
| 109 | Jenn Hill | Dem | **Karl Bohnak** | **Rep Gain** |
| 110 | Gregory Markkanen | Rep | Gregory Markkanen | Rep Hold |

=== Close races ===
Seats where the margin of victory was under 10%:

1. **District 44, 0.14% (gain)**
2. **District 31, 1.28%**
3. **District 61, 1.44%**
4. **District 109, 3.22% (gain)**
5. **District 46, 4.14%**
6. **District 103, 4.18%**
7. **District 76, 4.2%**
8. **District 27, 4.32% (gain)**
9. **District 48, 4.43%**
10. **District 13, 4.56%**
11. **District 54, 4.82%**
12. **District 22, 5%**
13. **District 83, 6.24%**
14. **District 38, 6.3%**
15. **District 58, 6.38% (gain)**
16. **District 20, 6.46%**
17. **District 55, 7.46%**
18. **District 40, 8.2%**
19. **District 28, 8.72%**
20. **District 68, 8.98%**
21. **District 2, 9.42%**
22. **District 73, 9.56%**

== Election results by district ==
All results below are from the certified election results posted by the secretary of state.

=== District 1 ===
2024 Michigan's 1st House of Representatives district general election
| Party | Candidate | Votes | % |
|---|---|---|---|
| Democratic | Tyrone Carter (incumbent) | 18,744 | 81.64% |
| Republican | Valerie Whittaker | 4,216 | 18.36% |
| Total votes | | 22,960 | 100.0 |

=== District 2 ===
2024 Michigan's 2nd House of Representatives district general election
| Party | Candidate | Votes | % |
|---|---|---|---|
| Democratic | Tullio Liberati (incumbent) | 21,965 | 51.82% |
| Republican | Ronald Kokinda | 17,972 | 42.40% |
| Working Class | Mark Dasacco | 2,450 | 5.78% |
| Total votes | | 42,387 | 100.0 |

=== District 3 ===
2024 Michigan's 3rd House of Representatives district general election
| Party | Candidate | Votes | % |
|---|---|---|---|
| Democratic | Alabas Farhat (incumbent) | 17,275 | 67.91% |
| Republican | Richard A. Zeile | 7,051 | 27.72% |
| Working Class | Larry Betts | 1,112 | 4.37% |
| Total votes | | 25,438 | 100.0 |

=== District 4 ===
2024 Michigan's 4th House of Representatives district general election
| Party | Candidate | Votes | % |
|---|---|---|---|
| Democratic | Karen Whitsett (incumbent) | 33,026 | 100.0 |
| Total votes | | 33,026 | 100.0 |

=== District 5 ===
2024 Michigan's 5th House of Representatives district general election
| Party | Candidate | Votes | % |
|---|---|---|---|
| Democratic | Regina Weiss (incumbent) | 41,136 | 90.57% |
| Republican | Will Sears | 4,282 | 9.43% |
| Total votes | | 45,418 | 100.0 |

=== District 6 ===
2024 Michigan's 6th House of Representatives district general election
| Party | Candidate | Votes | % |
|---|---|---|---|
| Democratic | Natalie Price (incumbent) | 39,839 | 66.20% |
| Republican | Brent M. Lamkin | 20,342 | 33.80% |
| Total votes | | 60,181 | 100.0 |

=== District 7 ===
2024 Michigan's 7th House of Representatives district general election
| Party | Candidate | Votes | % |
|---|---|---|---|
| Democratic | Tonya Myers Phillips | 22,713 | 78.91% |
| Republican | Barry L. Altman | 4,331 | 15.05% |
| Working Class | Linda Rayburn | 1,740 | 6.04% |
| Total votes | | 28,784 | 100.0 |

=== District 8 ===
2024 Michigan's 8th House of Representatives district general election
| Party | Candidate | Votes | % |
|---|---|---|---|
| Democratic | Helena Scott (incumbent) | 37,677 | 87.53% |
| Republican | Alex Kuhn | 3,964 | 9.21% |
| Working Class | Logan Ausherman | 1,402 | 3.26% |
| Total votes | | 43,043 | 100.0 |

=== District 9 ===
2024 Michigan's 9th House of Representatives district general election
| Party | Candidate | Votes | % |
|---|---|---|---|
| Democratic | Joe Tate (incumbent) | 33,310 | 93.00% |
| Republican | Michele Lundgren | 2,509 | 7.00% |
| Total votes | | 35,819 | 100.0 |

=== District 10 ===
2024 Michigan's 10th House of Representatives district general election
| Party | Candidate | Votes | % |
|---|---|---|---|
| Democratic | Veronica Paiz (incumbent) | 34,025 | 67.44% |
| Republican | Griffin Wojtowicz | 16,426 | 32.56% |
| Total votes | | 50,451 | 100.0 |

=== District 11 ===
2024 Michigan's 11th House of Representatives district general election
| Party | Candidate | Votes | % |
|---|---|---|---|
| Democratic | Donavan McKinney (incumbent) | 28,031 | 82.31% |
| Republican | Dale J. Walker | 6,025 | 17.69% |
| Total votes | | 34,056 | 100.0 |

=== District 12 ===
2024 Michigan's 12th House of Representatives district general election
| Party | Candidate | Votes | % |
|---|---|---|---|
| Democratic | Kimberly Edwards (incumbent) | 31,256 | 69.67% |
| Republican | Randell J. Shafer | 13,609 | 30.33% |
| Total votes | | 44,865 | 100.0 |

=== District 13 ===
2024 Michigan's 13th House of Representatives district general election
| Party | Candidate | Votes | % |
|---|---|---|---|
| Democratic | Mai Xiong (incumbent) | 24,911 | 50.82% |
| Republican | Ronald Singer | 22,673 | 46.26% |
| Working Class | Hashim Malik Bakari | 1,430 | 2.92% |
| Total votes | | 49,014 | 100.0 |

=== District 14 ===
2024 Michigan's 14th House of Representatives district general election
| Party | Candidate | Votes | % |
|---|---|---|---|
| Democratic | Mike McFall (incumbent) | 26,669 | 59.06% |
| Republican | Barbara Barber | 18,489 | 40.94% |
| Total votes | | 45,158 | 100.0 |

=== District 15 ===
2024 Michigan's 15th House of Representatives district general election
| Party | Candidate | Votes | % |
|---|---|---|---|
| Democratic | Erin Byrnes (incumbent) | 19,974 | 56.29% |
| Republican | Gary Edward Gardner | 15,512 | 43.71% |
| Total votes | | 35,486 | 100.0 |

=== District 16 ===
2024 Michigan's 16th House of Representatives district general election
| Party | Candidate | Votes | % |
|---|---|---|---|
| Democratic | Stephanie Young (incumbent) | 35,682 | 73.52% |
| Republican | Brian Duggan | 10,803 | 22.26% |
| Working Class | Linda Green-Harris | 2,050 | 4.22% |
| Total votes | | 48,535 | 100.0 |

=== District 17 ===
2024 Michigan's 17th House of Representatives district general election
| Party | Candidate | Votes | % |
|---|---|---|---|
| Democratic | Laurie Pohutsky (incumbent) | 31,741 | 69.75% |
| Republican | Rola Makki | 13,765 | 30.25% |
| Total votes | | 45,506 | 100.0 |

=== District 18 ===
2024 Michigan's 18th House of Representatives district general election
| Party | Candidate | Votes | % |
|---|---|---|---|
| Democratic | Jason Hoskins (incumbent) | 41,742 | 78.93% |
| Republican | Mordechai Klainberg | 11,144 | 21.07% |
| Total votes | | 52,886 | 100.0 |

=== District 19 ===
2024 Michigan's 19th House of Representatives district general election
| Party | Candidate | Votes | % |
|---|---|---|---|
| Democratic | Samantha Steckloff (incumbent) | 36,538 | 65.28% |
| Republican | Kevin J. Hammer | 19,431 | 34.72% |
| Total votes | | 55,969 | 100.0 |

=== District 20 ===
2024 Michigan's 20th House of Representatives district general election
| Party | Candidate | Votes | % |
|---|---|---|---|
| Democratic | Noah Arbit (incumbent) | 31,764 | 53.23% |
| Republican | Brendan Cowley | 27,909 | 46.77% |
| Total votes | | 59,673 | 100.0 |

=== District 21 ===
2024 Michigan's 21st House of Representatives district general election
| Party | Candidate | Votes | % |
|---|---|---|---|
| Democratic | Kelly Breen (incumbent) | 26,866 | 55.51% |
| Republican | Thomas Konesky | 20,834 | 43.05% |
| Libertarian | James K. Young | 697 | 1.44% |
| Total votes | | 48,397 | 100.0 |

=== District 22 ===
2024 Michigan's 22nd House of Representatives district general election
| Party | Candidate | Votes | % |
|---|---|---|---|
| Democratic | Matt Koleszar (incumbent) | 31,555 | 52.50% |
| Republican | Adam A. Stathakis | 28,555 | 47.50% |
| Total votes | | 60,110 | 100.0 |

=== District 23 ===
2024 Michigan's 23rd House of Representatives district general election
| Party | Candidate | Votes | % |
|---|---|---|---|
| Democratic | Jason Morgan (incumbent) | 29,913 | 61.51% |
| Republican | David Stamp | 17,486 | 35.96% |
| Green | Christina Marudas | 1,234 | 2.54% |
| Total votes | | 48,633 | 100.0 |

=== District 24 ===
2024 Michigan's 24th House of Representatives district general election
| Party | Candidate | Votes | % |
|---|---|---|---|
| Democratic | Ranjeev Puri (incumbent) | 30,675 | 59.82% |
| Republican | Leonard C. Scott | 20,602 | 40.18% |
| Total votes | | 51,277 | 100.0 |

=== District 25 ===
2024 Michigan's 25th House of Representatives district general election
| Party | Candidate | Votes | % |
|---|---|---|---|
| Democratic | Peter Herzberg (incumbent) | 26,092 | 58.93% |
| Republican | Josh Powell | 18,183 | 41.07% |
| Total votes | | 44,275 | 100.0 |

=== District 26 ===
2024 Michigan's 26th House of Representatives district general election
| Party | Candidate | Votes | % |
|---|---|---|---|
| Democratic | Dylan Wegela (incumbent) | 27,162 | 65.72% |
| Republican | Jeff Gorman | 14,171 | 34.28% |
| Total votes | | 41,333 | 100.0 |

=== District 27 ===
2024 Michigan's 27th House of Representatives district general election
| Party | Candidate | Votes | % |
|---|---|---|---|
| Republican | Rylee Linting | 27,785 | 52.16% |
| Democratic | Jaime Churches (incumbent) | 25,480 | 47.84% |
| Total votes | | 53,265 | 100.0 |

=== District 28 ===
2024 Michigan's 28th House of Representatives district general election
| Party | Candidate | Votes | % |
|---|---|---|---|
| Republican | Jamie Thompson (incumbent) | 26,754 | 54.36% |
| Democratic | Janise O'Neil Robinson | 22,458 | 45.64% |
| Total votes | | 49,212 | 100.0 |

=== District 29 ===
2024 Michigan's 29th House of Representatives district general election
| Party | Candidate | Votes | % |
|---|---|---|---|
| Republican | James DeSana (incumbent) | 25,669 | 55.03% |
| Democratic | Kyle Wright | 20,975 | 44.97% |
| Total votes | | 46,644 | 100.0 |

=== District 30 ===
2024 Michigan's 30th House of Representatives district general election
| Party | Candidate | Votes | % |
|---|---|---|---|
| Republican | William Bruck (incumbent) | 33,278 | 64.54% |
| Democratic | Rick Kull | 18,282 | 35.46% |
| Total votes | | 51,560 | 100.0 |

=== District 31 ===
2024 Michigan's 31st House of Representatives district general election
| Party | Candidate | Votes | % |
|---|---|---|---|
| Democratic | Reggie Miller (incumbent) | 27,347 | 50.64% |
| Republican | Dale Biniecki | 26,651 | 49.36% |
| Total votes | | 53,998 | 100.0 |

=== District 32 ===
2024 Michigan's 32nd House of Representatives district general election
| Party | Candidate | Votes | % |
|---|---|---|---|
| Democratic | Jimmie Wilson Jr. (incumbent) | 34,004 | 75.08% |
| Republican | Martin A. Church | 9,767 | 21.56% |
| Green | Ryan Sample | 1,521 | 3.36% |
| Total votes | | 45,292 | 100.0 |

=== District 33 ===
2024 Michigan's 33rd House of Representatives district general election
| Party | Candidate | Votes | % |
|---|---|---|---|
| Democratic | Morgan Foreman | 41,511 | 74.22% |
| Republican | Jason Rogers | 14,421 | 25.78% |
| Total votes | | 55,932 | 100.0 |

=== District 34 ===
2024 Michigan's 34th House of Representatives district general election
| Party | Candidate | Votes | % |
|---|---|---|---|
| Republican | Nancy Jenkins-Arno | 31,086 | 64.07% |
| Democratic | John E. Dahlgen | 17,436 | 35.93% |
| Total votes | | 48,522 | 100.0 |

=== District 35 ===
2024 Michigan's 35th House of Representatives district general election
| Party | Candidate | Votes | % |
|---|---|---|---|
| Republican | Jennifer Wortz | 33,647 | 74.07% |
| Democratic | Don Hicks | 11,777 | 25.93% |
| Total votes | | 45,424 | 100.0 |

=== District 36 ===
2024 Michigan's 36th House of Representatives district general election
| Party | Candidate | Votes | % |
|---|---|---|---|
| Republican | Steve Carra (incumbent) | 29,710 | 68.35% |
| Democratic | Erin L. Schultes | 13,758 | 31.65% |
| Total votes | | 43,468 | 100.0 |

=== District 37 ===
2024 Michigan's 37th House of Representatives district general election
| Party | Candidate | Votes | % |
|---|---|---|---|
| Republican | Brad Paquette (incumbent) | 30,265 | 64.89% |
| Democratic | Angela Jones | 16,379 | 35.11% |
| Total votes | | 46,644 | 100.0 |

=== District 38 ===
2024 Michigan's 38th House of Representatives district general election
| Party | Candidate | Votes | % |
|---|---|---|---|
| Democratic | Joey Andrews (incumbent) | 28,515 | 53.15% |
| Republican | Kevin Whiteford | 25,133 | 46.85% |
| Total votes | | 53,648 | 100.0 |

=== District 39 ===
2024 Michigan's 39th House of Representatives district general election
| Party | Candidate | Votes | % |
|---|---|---|---|
| Republican | Pauline Wendzel (incumbent) | 29,906 | 63.09% |
| Democratic | Kerry Tapper | 17,498 | 36.91% |
| Total votes | | 47,404 | 100.0 |

=== District 40 ===
2024 Michigan's 40th House of Representatives district general election
| Party | Candidate | Votes | % |
|---|---|---|---|
| Democratic | Matt Longjohn | 21,877 | 54.1% |
| Republican | Kelly Sackett | 18,592 | 45.9% |
| Total votes | | 40,469 | 100.0 |

=== District 41 ===
2024 Michigan's 41st House of Representatives district general election
| Party | Candidate | Votes | % |
|---|---|---|---|
| Democratic | Julie Rogers (incumbent) | 30,106 | 75.64% |
| Republican | Terry Haines | 8,725 | 21.92% |
| Libertarian | Rafael Wolf | 973 | 2.44% |
| Total votes | | 39,804 | 100.0 |

=== District 42 ===
2024 Michigan's 42nd House of Representatives district general election
| Party | Candidate | Votes | % |
|---|---|---|---|
| Republican | Matt Hall (incumbent) | 30,999 | 57.46% |
| Democratic | Austin Marsman | 22,947 | 42.54% |
| Total votes | | 53,946 | 100.0 |

=== District 43 ===
2024 Michigan's 43rd House of Representatives district general election
| Party | Candidate | Votes | % |
|---|---|---|---|
| Republican | Rachelle Smit (incumbent) | 39,396 | 72.07% |
| Democratic | Danene Shumaker | 15,265 | 27.93% |
| Total votes | | 54,661 | 100.0 |

=== District 44 ===
2024 Michigan's 44th House of Representatives district general election
| Party | Candidate | Votes | % |
|---|---|---|---|
| Republican | Steve Frisbie | 20,835 | 50.07% |
| Democratic | Jim Haadsma (incumbent) | 20,774 | 49.93% |
| Total votes | | 41,609 | 100.0 |

=== District 45 ===
2024 Michigan's 45th House of Representatives district general election
| Party | Candidate | Votes | % |
|---|---|---|---|
| Republican | Sarah Lightner (incumbent) | 35,411 | 69.59% |
| Democratic | Doug Murch | 15,472 | 30.41% |
| Total votes | | 50,883 | 100.0 |

=== District 46 ===
2024 Michigan's 46th House of Representatives district general election
| Party | Candidate | Votes | % |
|---|---|---|---|
| Republican | Kathy Schmaltz (incumbent) | 21,563 | 52.07% |
| Democratic | Daniel J. Mahoney | 19,851 | 47.93% |
| Total votes | | 41,414 | 100.0 |

=== District 47 ===
2024 Michigan's 47th House of Representatives district general election
| Party | Candidate | Votes | % |
|---|---|---|---|
| Democratic | Carrie Rheingans (incumbent) | 35,216 | 60.13% |
| Republican | Teresa Spiegelberg | 22,255 | 38.00% |
| Green | Aaron Wright | 1,093 | 1.87% |
| Total votes | | 58,564 | 100.0 |

=== District 48 ===
2024 Michigan's 48th House of Representatives district general election
| Party | Candidate | Votes | % |
|---|---|---|---|
| Democratic | Jennifer Conlin (incumbent) | 31,153 | 51.50% |
| Republican | Brian Ignatowski | 28,471 | 47.07% |
| Green | Eric Borregard | 863 | 1.43% |
| Total votes | | 60,487 | 100.0 |

=== District 49 ===
2024 Michigan's 49th House of Representatives district general election
| Party | Candidate | Votes | % |
|---|---|---|---|
| Republican | Ann Bollin (incumbent) | 32,464 | 58.86% |
| Democratic | Andy Woody | 22,695 | 41.14% |
| Total votes | | 55,159 | 100.0 |

=== District 50 ===
2024 Michigan's 50th House of Representatives district general election
| Party | Candidate | Votes | % |
|---|---|---|---|
| Republican | Jason Woolford | 40,119 | 67.64% |
| Democratic | Austin Breuer | 19,193 | 32.36% |
| Total votes | | 59,312 | 100.0 |

=== District 51 ===
2024 Michigan's 51st House of Representatives district general election
| Party | Candidate | Votes | % |
|---|---|---|---|
| Republican | Matt Maddock (incumbent) | 35,011 | 59.52% |
| Democratic | Sarah May-Seward | 23,809 | 40.48% |
| Total votes | | 58,820 | 100.0 |

=== District 52 ===
2024 Michigan's 52nd House of Representatives district general election
| Party | Candidate | Votes | % |
|---|---|---|---|
| Republican | Mike Harris (incumbent) | 34,810 | 62.03% |
| Democratic | Caroline Dargay | 21,304 | 37.97% |
| Total votes | | 56,114 | 100.0 |

=== District 53 ===
2024 Michigan's 53rd House of Representatives district general election
| Party | Candidate | Votes | % |
|---|---|---|---|
| Democratic | Brenda Carter (incumbent) | 25,432 | 65.85% |
| Republican | Melissa Schultz | 13,189 | 34.15% |
| Total votes | | 38,621 | 100.0 |

=== District 54 ===
2024 Michigan's 54th House of Representatives district general election
| Party | Candidate | Votes | % |
|---|---|---|---|
| Republican | Donni Steele (incumbent) | 28,884 | 52.41% |
| Democratic | Shadia Martini | 26,223 | 47.59% |
| Total votes | | 55,107 | 100.0 |

=== District 55 ===
2024 Michigan's 55th House of Representatives district general election
| Party | Candidate | Votes | % |
|---|---|---|---|
| Republican | Mark Tisdel (incumbent) | 29,026 | 53.73% |
| Democratic | Trevis Harrold | 24,993 | 46.27% |
| Total votes | | 54,019 | 100.0 |

=== District 56 ===
2024 Michigan's 56th House of Representatives district general election
| Party | Candidate | Votes | % |
|---|---|---|---|
| Democratic | Sharon MacDonell (incumbent) | 29,111 | 57.19% |
| Republican | Dave Kniffen | 21,790 | 42.81% |
| Total votes | | 50,901 | 100.0 |

=== District 57 ===
2024 Michigan's 57th House of Representatives district general election
| Party | Candidate | Votes | % |
|---|---|---|---|
| Republican | Thomas Kuhn (incumbent) | 26,706 | 57.24% |
| Democratic | Aisha Farooqi | 19,954 | 42.76% |
| Total votes | | 46,660 | 100.0 |

=== District 58 ===
2024 Michigan's 58th House of Representatives district general election
| Party | Candidate | Votes | % |
|---|---|---|---|
| Republican | Ron Robinson | 24,925 | 53.19% |
| Democratic | Nate Shannon (incumbent) | 21,939 | 46.81% |
| Total votes | | 46,864 | 100.0 |

=== District 59 ===
2024 Michigan's 59th House of Representatives district general election
| Party | Candidate | Votes | % |
|---|---|---|---|
| Republican | Doug Wozniak (incumbent) | 38,064 | 68.58% |
| Democratic | Jason Pulaski | 17,439 | 31.42% |
| Total votes | | 55,503 | 100.0 |

=== District 60 ===
2024 Michigan's 60th House of Representatives district general election
| Party | Candidate | Votes | % |
|---|---|---|---|
| Republican | Joseph Aragona (incumbent) | 33,949 | 62.17% |
| Democratic | Shelley Fraley | 20,654 | 37.83% |
| Total votes | | 54,603 | 100.0 |

=== District 61 ===
2024 Michigan's 61st House of Representatives district general election
| Party | Candidate | Votes | % |
|---|---|---|---|
| Democratic | Denise Mentzer (incumbent) | 25,449 | 50.72% |
| Republican | Robert Wojtowicz | 24,728 | 49.28% |
| Total votes | | 50,177 | 100.0 |

=== District 62 ===
2024 Michigan's 62nd House of Representatives district general election
| Party | Candidate | Votes | % |
|---|---|---|---|
| Republican | Alicia St. Germaine (incumbent) | 28,761 | 55.99% |
| Democratic | Michelle Levine-Woodman | 22,606 | 44.01% |
| Total votes | | 51,367 | 100.0 |

=== District 63 ===
2024 Michigan's 63rd House of Representatives district general election
| Party | Candidate | Votes | % |
|---|---|---|---|
| Republican | Jay DeBoyer (incumbent) | 37,308 | 67.70% |
| Democratic | Robert E. Kelly-McFarland | 17,801 | 32.30% |
| Total votes | | 55,109 | 100.0 |

=== District 64 ===
2024 Michigan's 64th House of Representatives district general election
| Party | Candidate | Votes | % |
|---|---|---|---|
| Republican | Joseph G. Pavlov | 29,808 | 61.04% |
| Democratic | John Anter | 19,026 | 38.96% |
| Total votes | | 48,834 | 100.0 |

=== District 65 ===
2024 Michigan's 65th House of Representatives district general election
| Party | Candidate | Votes | % |
|---|---|---|---|
| Republican | Jaime Greene (incumbent) | 40,952 | 74.27% |
| Democratic | Shirley Tomczak | 14,190 | 25.73% |
| Total votes | | 55,142 | 100.0 |

=== District 66 ===
2024 Michigan's 66th House of Representatives district general election
| Party | Candidate | Votes | % |
|---|---|---|---|
| Republican | Josh Schriver (incumbent) | 39,990 | 68.04% |
| Democratic | Shawn Almeranti-Crosby | 18,781 | 31.96% |
| Total votes | | 58,771 | 100.0 |

=== District 67 ===
2024 Michigan's 67th House of Representatives district general election
| Party | Candidate | Votes | % |
|---|---|---|---|
| Republican | Phil Green (incumbent) | 34,024 | 63.83% |
| Democratic | Anissa J. Buffin | 19,277 | 36.17% |
| Total votes | | 53,301 | 100.0 |

=== District 68 ===
Initially, former state representative Tim Sneller was the only candidate running in the Democratic primary election in the 68th district. He died on July 11. Matt Schlinker of Goodrich announced his candidacy on July 28. The Michigan Democratic State Central Committee attempted to replace Sneller on the August primary ballot with Schlinker, however Judge James Robert Redford ruled that they attempted to do so too late, as early voting had already began. Schlinker began a write-in campaign two weeks before the election. While Sneller won over 6,000 votes, Schlinker ultimately received the number of votes necessary to win the primary.

Incumbent representative David Martin won the Republican primary unopposed.

Democratic Primary
| Party | Candidate | Votes | % |
|---|---|---|---|
| Democratic | Tim Sneller | 6,656 | 84.55% |
| Democratic | Matt Schlinker | 1,216 | 15.45% |
| Total votes | | 7,872 | 100.0 |

Republican Primary
| Party | Candidate | Votes | % |
|---|---|---|---|
| Republican | David Martin (incumbent) | 5,929 | 100.0 |
| Total votes | | 5,929 | 100.0 |

2024 Michigan's 68th House of Representatives district general election
| Party | Candidate | Votes | % |
|---|---|---|---|
| Republican | David Martin (incumbent) | 29,402 | 54.49% |
| Democratic | Matt Schlinker | 24,554 | 45.51% |
| Total votes | | 53,956 | 100.0 |

=== District 69 ===
2024 Michigan's 69th House of Representatives district general election
| Party | Candidate | Votes | % |
|---|---|---|---|
| Democratic | Jasper Martus (incumbent) | 26,793 | 56.25% |
| Republican | Patrick Duvendeck | 20,836 | 43.75% |
| Total votes | | 47,629 | 100.0 |

=== District 70 ===
2024 Michigan's 70th House of Representatives district general election
| Party | Candidate | Votes | % |
|---|---|---|---|
| Democratic | Cynthia Neeley (incumbent) | 28,486 | 79.35% |
| Republican | Rob Waskoviak | 7,224 | 20.12% |
| Write-ins | | 187 | 0.52% |
| Total votes | | 35,897 | 100.0 |

=== District 71 ===
2024 Michigan's 71st House of Representatives district general election
| Party | Candidate | Votes | % |
|---|---|---|---|
| Republican | Brian BeGole (incumbent) | 33,831 | 62.63% |
| Democratic | Mark D. Zacharda | 20,183 | 37.37% |
| Total votes | | 54,014 | 100.0 |

=== District 72 ===
2024 Michigan's 72nd House of Representatives district general election
| Party | Candidate | Votes | % |
|---|---|---|---|
| Republican | Mike Mueller (incumbent) | 34,910 | 60.80% |
| Democratic | John Dolza | 22,512 | 39.20% |
| Total votes | | 57,422 | 100.0 |

=== District 73 ===
2024 Michigan's 73rd House of Representatives district general election
| Party | Candidate | Votes | % |
|---|---|---|---|
| Democratic | Julie Brixie (incumbent) | 24,684 | 54.78% |
| Republican | Joshua J. Rockey | 20,377 | 45.22% |
| Total votes | | 45,061 | 100.0 |

=== District 74 ===
2024 Michigan's 74th House of Representatives district general election
| Party | Candidate | Votes | % |
|---|---|---|---|
| Democratic | Kara Hope (incumbent) | 28,976 | 64.25% |
| Republican | Tom Izzo | 16,120 | 35.75% |
| Total votes | | 45,096 | 100.0 |

=== District 75 ===
2024 Michigan's 75th House of Representatives district general election
| Party | Candidate | Votes | % |
|---|---|---|---|
| Democratic | Penelope Tsernoglou (incumbent) | 31,024 | 59.11% |
| Republican | Frank Lambert | 21,457 | 40.89% |
| Total votes | | 52,481 | 100.0 |

=== District 76 ===
2024 Michigan's 76th House of Representatives district general election
| Party | Candidate | Votes | % |
|---|---|---|---|
| Democratic | Angela Witwer (incumbent) | 28,229 | 52.10% |
| Republican | Andy Shaver | 25,958 | 47.90% |
| Total votes | | 54,187 | 100.0 |

=== District 77 ===
2024 Michigan's 77th House of Representatives district general election
| Party | Candidate | Votes | % |
|---|---|---|---|
| Democratic | Emily Dievendorf (incumbent) | 30,203 | 60.20% |
| Republican | Cady Ness-Smith | 19,971 | 39.80% |
| Total votes | | 50,174 | 100.0 |

=== District 78 ===
2024 Michigan's 78th House of Representatives district general election
| Party | Candidate | Votes | % |
|---|---|---|---|
| Republican | Gina Johnsen (incumbent) | 33,508 | 68.59% |
| Democratic | Christine M. Terpening | 15,344 | 31.41% |
| Total votes | | 48,852 | 100.0 |

=== District 79 ===
2024 Michigan's 79th House of Representatives district general election
| Party | Candidate | Votes | % |
|---|---|---|---|
| Republican | Angela Rigas (incumbent) | 36,511 | 66.21% |
| Democratic | Jason Rubin | 18,635 | 33.79% |
| Total votes | | 55,146 | 100.0 |

=== District 80 ===
2024 Michigan's 80th House of Representatives district general election
| Party | Candidate | Votes | % |
|---|---|---|---|
| Democratic | Phil Skaggs (incumbent) | 29,560 | 57.14% |
| Republican | Bill Sage | 22,172 | 42.86% |
| Total votes | | 51,732 | 100.0 |

=== District 81 ===
2024 Michigan's 81st House of Representatives district general election
| Party | Candidate | Votes | % |
|---|---|---|---|
| Democratic | Stephen Wooden | 30,666 | 55.71% |
| Republican | Jordan Youngquist | 24,375 | 44.29% |
| Total votes | | 55,041 | 100.0 |

=== District 82 ===
2024 Michigan's 82nd House of Representatives district general election
| Party | Candidate | Votes | % |
|---|---|---|---|
| Democratic | Kristian Grant (incumbent) | 30,656 | 75.07% |
| Republican | Ryan Malinoski | 10,178 | 24.93% |
| Total votes | | 40,834 | 100.0 |

=== District 83 ===
2024 Michigan's 83rd House of Representatives district general election
| Party | Candidate | Votes | % |
|---|---|---|---|
| Democratic | John Wesley Fitzgerald (incumbent) | 20,547 | 53.12% |
| Republican | Tommy Brann | 18,134 | 46.88% |
| Total votes | | 38,681 | 100.0 |

=== District 84 ===
2024 Michigan's 84th House of Representatives district general election
| Party | Candidate | Votes | % |
|---|---|---|---|
| Democratic | Carol Glanville (incumbent) | 27,502 | 55.06% |
| Republican | John Wetzel | 22,450 | 44.94% |
| Total votes | | 49,952 | 100.0 |

=== District 85 ===
2024 Michigan's 85th House of Representatives district general election
| Party | Candidate | Votes | % |
|---|---|---|---|
| Republican | Bradley Slagh (incumbent) | 39,199 | 70.39% |
| Democratic | Marcia Mansaray | 16,490 | 29.61% |
| Total votes | | 55,689 | 100.0 |

=== District 86 ===
2024 Michigan's 86th House of Representatives district general election
| Party | Candidate | Votes | % |
|---|---|---|---|
| Republican | Nancy De Boer (incumbent) | 27,711 | 56.10% |
| Democratic | Abby Klomparens | 21,685 | 43.90% |
| Total votes | | 49,396 | 100.0 |

=== District 87 ===
2024 Michigan's 87th House of Representatives district general election
| Party | Candidate | Votes | % |
|---|---|---|---|
| Democratic | Will Snyder (incumbent) | 24,679 | 59.33% |
| Republican | Chip Chipman | 15,742 | 37.85% |
| Libertarian | Rich McClain | 1,173 | 2.82% |
| Total votes | | 41,594 | 100.0 |

=== District 88 ===
2024 Michigan's 88th House of Representatives district general election
| Party | Candidate | Votes | % |
|---|---|---|---|
| Republican | Greg VanWoerkom (incumbent) | 33,591 | 56.97% |
| Democratic | Tim Meyer | 25,367 | 43.03% |
| Total votes | | 58,958 | 100.0 |

=== District 89 ===
2024 Michigan's 89th House of Representatives district general election
| Party | Candidate | Votes | % |
|---|---|---|---|
| Republican | Luke Meerman (incumbent) | 35,147 | 69.31% |
| Democratic | Lois E. Maassen | 15,563 | 30.69% |
| Total votes | | 50,710 | 100.0 |

=== District 90 ===
2024 Michigan's 90th House of Representatives district general election
| Party | Candidate | Votes | % |
|---|---|---|---|
| Republican | Bryan Posthumus (incumbent) | 36,841 | 63.52% |
| Democratic | William J. Higgins | 21,161 | 36.48% |
| Total votes | | 58,002 | 100.0 |

=== District 91 ===
2024 Michigan's 91st House of Representatives district general election
| Party | Candidate | Votes | % |
|---|---|---|---|
| Republican | Pat Outman (incumbent) | 36,463 | 71.45% |
| Democratic | Jason A. Dillingham | 14,570 | 28.55% |
| Total votes | | 51,033 | 100.0 |

=== District 92 ===
2024 Michigan's 92nd House of Representatives district general election
| Party | Candidate | Votes | % |
|---|---|---|---|
| Republican | Jerry Neyer (incumbent) | 24,007 | 57.52% |
| Democratic | Timothy Odykirk | 17,733 | 42.48% |
| Total votes | | 41,740 | 100.0 |

=== District 93 ===
2024 Michigan's 93rd House of Representatives district general election
| Party | Candidate | Votes | % |
|---|---|---|---|
| Republican | Tim Kelly | 33,943 | 68.97% |
| Democratic | Kevin C. Seamon | 15,272 | 31.03% |
| Total votes | | 49,215 | 100.0 |

=== District 94 ===
2024 Michigan's 94th House of Representatives district general election
| Party | Candidate | Votes | % |
|---|---|---|---|
| Democratic | Amos O'Neal (incumbent) | 28,354 | 68.87% |
| Republican | Robert E. Zelle | 12,817 | 31.13% |
| Total votes | | 41,171 | 100.0 |

=== District 95 ===
2024 Michigan's 95th House of Representatives district general election
| Party | Candidate | Votes | % |
|---|---|---|---|
| Republican | Bill G. Schuette (incumbent) | 34,477 | 64.29% |
| Democratic | Sabrina Lopez | 19,148 | 35.71% |
| Total votes | | 53,625 | 100.0 |

=== District 96 ===
2024 Michigan's 96th House of Representatives district general election
| Party | Candidate | Votes | % |
|---|---|---|---|
| Republican | Timothy Beson (incumbent) | 31,135 | 60.33% |
| Democratic | Rudy M. Howard Jr. | 20,474 | 39.67% |
| Total votes | | 51,609 | 100.0 |

=== District 97 ===
2024 Michigan's 97th House of Representatives district general election
| Party | Candidate | Votes | % |
|---|---|---|---|
| Republican | Matthew Bierlein (incumbent) | 36,497 | 70.36% |
| Democratic | Mark Putnam | 15,378 | 29.64% |
| Total votes | | 51,875 | 100.0 |

=== District 98 ===
2024 Michigan's 98th House of Representatives district general election
| Party | Candidate | Votes | % |
|---|---|---|---|
| Republican | Gregory Alexander (incumbent) | 38,048 | 74.02% |
| Democratic | April L. Osentoski | 13,355 | 25.98% |
| Total votes | | 51,403 | 100.0 |

=== District 99 ===
2024 Michigan's 99th House of Representatives district general election
| Party | Candidate | Votes | % |
|---|---|---|---|
| Republican | Mike Hoadley (incumbent) | 36,710 | 71.09% |
| Democratic | John Leroux | 14,926 | 28.91% |
| Total votes | | 51,636 | 100.0 |

=== District 100 ===
2024 Michigan's 100th House of Representatives district general election
| Party | Candidate | Votes | % |
|---|---|---|---|
| Republican | Tom Kunse (incumbent) | 35,024 | 69.29% |
| Democratic | Tracy Ruell | 15,522 | 30.71% |
| Total votes | | 50,546 | 100.0 |

=== District 101 ===
2024 Michigan's 101st House of Representatives district general election
| Party | Candidate | Votes | % |
|---|---|---|---|
| Republican | Joseph Fox (incumbent) | 36,451 | 70.44% |
| Democratic | Christopher R. Crain | 15,300 | 29.56% |
| Total votes | | 51,751 | 100.0 |

=== District 102 ===
2024 Michigan's 102nd House of Representatives district general election
| Party | Candidate | Votes | % |
|---|---|---|---|
| Republican | Curt VanderWall (incumbent) | 34,218 | 63.79% |
| Democratic | Kathy Pelleran-Mahoney | 19,421 | 36.21% |
| Total votes | | 53,639 | 100.0 |

=== District 103 ===
2024 Michigan's 103rd House of Representatives district general election
| Party | Candidate | Votes | % |
|---|---|---|---|
| Democratic | Betsy Coffia (incumbent) | 33,662 | 52.09% |
| Republican | Lisa Trombley | 30,960 | 47.91% |
| Total votes | | 64,622 | 100.0 |

=== District 104 ===
2024 Michigan's 104th House of Representatives district general election
| Party | Candidate | Votes | % |
|---|---|---|---|
| Republican | John Roth (incumbent) | 36,778 | 62.93% |
| Democratic | Larry Knight | 16,681 | 28.54% |
| Independent | Cathy Albro | 3,800 | 6.50% |
| Libertarian | Tyler Glenn Lautner | 1,188 | 2.03% |
| Total votes | | 58,447 | 100.0 |

=== District 105 ===
2024 Michigan's 105th House of Representatives district general election
| Party | Candidate | Votes | % |
|---|---|---|---|
| Republican | Ken Borton (incumbent) | 40,043 | 71.73% |
| Democratic | James Wojey | 15,780 | 28.27% |
| Total votes | | 55,823 | 100.0 |

=== District 106 ===
2024 Michigan's 106th House of Representatives district general election
| Party | Candidate | Votes | % |
|---|---|---|---|
| Republican | Cam Cavitt (incumbent) | 39,397 | 69.58% |
| Democratic | Trina Borenstein | 17,221 | 30.42% |
| Total votes | | 56,618 | 100.0 |

=== District 107 ===
2024 Michigan's 107th House of Representatives district general election
| Party | Candidate | Votes | % |
|---|---|---|---|
| Republican | Parker Fairbairn | 34,728 | 60.67% |
| Democratic | Jodi Decker | 22,516 | 39.33% |
| Total votes | | 57,244 | 100.0 |

=== District 108 ===
2024 Michigan's 108th House of Representatives district general election
| Party | Candidate | Votes | % |
|---|---|---|---|
| Republican | David Prestin (incumbent) | 32,416 | 66.36% |
| Democratic | Christiana Reynolds | 15,369 | 31.46% |
| Libertarian | Kayla Wikstrom | 1,061 | 2.17% |
| Total votes | | 48,846 | 100.0 |

=== District 109 ===
2024 Michigan's 109th House of Representatives district general election
| Party | Candidate | Votes | % |
|---|---|---|---|
| Republican | Karl Bohnak | 26,807 | 51.61% |
| Democratic | Jenn Hill (incumbent) | 25,134 | 48.39% |
| Total votes | | 51,941 | 100.0 |

=== District 110 ===
2024 Michigan's 110th House of Representatives district general election
| Party | Candidate | Votes | % |
|---|---|---|---|
| Republican | Gregory Markkanen (incumbent) | 31,583 | 63.07% |
| Democratic | Kim S. Corcoran | 18,493 | 36.93% |
| Total votes | | 50,076 | 100.0 |

== See also ==
- 2024 Michigan elections
- List of Michigan state legislatures
