= Jaime Churches =

American politician (born 1988)

Member of the Michigan House of Representatives from the 27th district
- In office January 1, 2023 – January 1, 2025
- Preceded by: Regina Weiss
- Succeeded by: Rylee Linting

Personal details
- Born: August 23, 1988 (age 37) Snellville, Georgia, U.S.
- Party: Democratic
- Education: Madonna University (BS, MS)
- Website: Election site

Jaime Churches (born August 23, 1988) is an American educator and politician who served as a member of the Michigan House of Representatives from 2023 to 2025. She lost reelection in 2024, and was succeeded by Republican Rylee Linting.

== Early life and education ==
Born in Snellville, Georgia, Churches was raised in the Downriver region of Metro Detroit. She earned a Bachelor of Science in education and a Master of Science in educational administration from Madonna University.

== Career ==
Churches worked as a student teacher at several elementary schools before joining Wegienka Elementary School as a full-time, fifth grade teacher in 2012. From 2005 to 2012, she worked as a summer camp director at the Building Blocks Daycare and Learning Center. Since 2018, she has worked as a fifth grade teacher in the Grosse Ile Township Schools. Churches was elected to the Michigan House of Representatives in November 2022.
