= Carrie Rheingans =

American politician from Michigan

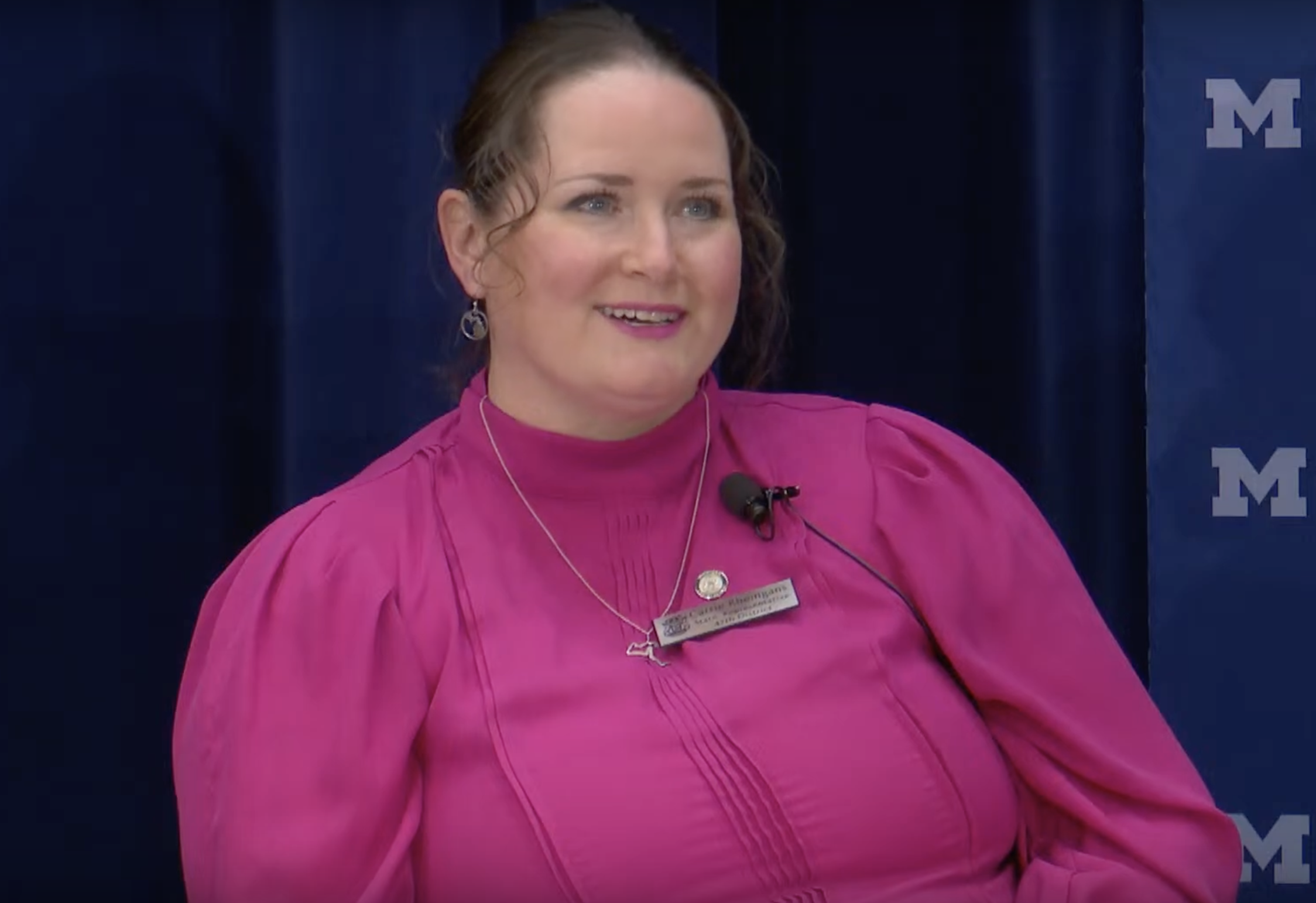
- Rheingans in 2024

Member of the Michigan House of Representatives from the 47th district
- Incumbent
- Assumed office January 1, 2023
- Preceded by: Bob Bezotte

Personal details
- Born: October 2, 1981 (age 45) Flint, Michigan, U.S.
- Citizenship: USA
- Party: Democratic
- Education: University of Michigan, Ann Arbor (BS, MPH, MSW)
- Website: reprheingans.com

Carrie Amber Rheingans is an American politician serving as a member of the Michigan House of Representatives since 2023, representing the 47th district. She is a member of the Democratic Party.

== Political career ==
Rheingans was first elected in the 2022 election. She was reelected in 2024.

=== Laws enacted ===
All five laws enacted that Rep. Rheingans sponsored have been bipartisan. Rep. Rheingans' first bill ever introduced (HB4125 of 2023) was also her first bill enacted into state law (PA 51 of 2023). It was a bill to protect students from expulsion for reporting being sexually assaulted.

Rep. Rheingans was the lead sponsor on two new state laws affecting Michigan's tribal communities. The first (HB4852 of 2023) was to designate manoomin, or Great Lakes-area wild rice, as Michigan's state native grain. With this law (PA 247 of 2023), Michigan became the first state in the nation to designate a state native grain. In addition, Rep. Rheingans worked with all twelve federally-recognized tribes sharing borders with Michigan to establish the first-in-the-nation Office of Tribal Legislative Liaison (HB5600 of 2024, PA 208 of 2024).

Rep. Rheingans also led a package of bills to revise Michigan's child safety seat laws to include consideration of weight and height of children, not just ages (HB4511 of 2023, PA 21 of 2024). Rep. Rheingans and her package co-sponsor, Rep. John Fitzgerald, received the Kids Health Hero Award from the Michigan Chapter of the American Academy of Pediatrics for this work.

Rep. Rheingans introduced many bills addressing the opioid epidemic, and the one that has become law (HB5078 of 2023, PA 232 of 2024) clarifies abilities for public entities to distribute naloxone, an overdose reversing medication.
