= Bradford Jacobsen =

American politician

Bradford C. Jacobsen

Member of the Michigan House of Representatives from the 46th district
- In office January 1, 2011 – 2017
- Preceded by: Jim Marleau
- Succeeded by: John Reilly

Personal details
- Born: January 18, 1957 (age 69) Pontiac, Michigan
- Party: Republican
- Spouse: Teri
- Education: Michigan State University
- Website: State Rep. Brad Jacobsen

Bradford C. Jacobsen (born January 18, 1957) is a Republican politician from Michigan who served in the Michigan House of Representatives.

Prior to his election to the House, Jacobsen served as an Oakland County Commissioner, township trustee, and chaired the Lake Orion Downtown Development Authority. He is also the vice president of Jacobsen's Flowers.
