= Michigan's 46th House of Representatives district =

American legislative district

Michigan's 46th State House of Representatives district
Representative
Kathy Schmaltz; R–Jackson
- Demographics: 75.4% White; 11.9% Black; 4.5% Hispanic; 0.9% Asian; 0.3% Native American; 0.3% Other; 6.7% Multiracial
- Population (2024): 91,029

Michigan's 46th House of Representatives district is a legislative district within the Michigan House of Representatives located in the counties of Jackson and Washtenaw. The district was created in 1965, when the Michigan Supreme Court ordered the reapportionment of state legislative districts from a county-based system to a proportional one following the Supreme Court case Reynolds v. Sims. It is currently represented by Republican Kathy Schmaltz of Jackson.

== List of representatives ==
Representative	Party	Years	Residence	Notes
Homer Arnett	Republican	1965–1966	Kalamazoo	
William V. Weber	Republican	1967–1972	Kalamazoo	
Howard Wolpe	Democratic	1973–1976	Kalamazoo	
Mary Brown	Democratic	1977–1992	Kalamazoo	
Tom F. Middleton	Republican	1993–1998	Ortonville	
Ruth Johnson	Republican	1999–2004	Holly Township	
James Marleau	Republican	2005–2010	Lake Orion	
Bradford Jacobsen	Republican	2011–2016	Oxford Township	
John Reilly	Republican	2017–2022	Oakland Township	
Kathy Schmaltz	Republican	2023–present	Jackson	
Jan Maino	Democratic	(Note: Member-elect.)	Jackson	

== Historical district boundaries ==
Map	Description	Apportionment Plan	Notes
	Kalamazoo County (part): Kalamazoo (part)	1964 Apportionment Plan	
	Kalamazoo County (part): Kalamazoo (part); Kalamazoo Township	1972 Apportionment Plan	
	Kalamazoo County (part): Kalamazoo; Kalamazoo Township (part)	1982 Apportionment Plan	
	Oakland County (part): Brandon Township; Groveland Township; Highland Township; Holly Township; Rose Township; Independence Township; Springfield Township	1992 Apportionment Plan	
	Oakland County (part): Addison Township; Brandon Township; Groveland Township; Holly Township; Orion Township; Oxford Township; Rose Township	2001 Apportionment Plan	
	Oakland County (part): Addison Township; Brandon Township; Oakland Charter Township (part); Orion Township; Oxford Township	2011 Apportionment Plan	
	Jackson County (part): Blackman Charter Township; Grass Lake Charter Township (part); Jackson; Leoni Township; Summit Township (part); Washtenaw County (part): Chelsea; Lyndon Township (part); Sharon Township (part); Sylvan Township (part)	2021 Apportionment Plan (Note: Referred to as the Hickory plan.)	

== Recent elections ==
=== 2020s ===
2026 Michigan House of Representatives election
Party	Candidate	Votes	%
Democratic	Jan Maino	18,641	54.11
Republican	Kathy Schmaltz (incumbent)	15,812	45.89
Total votes		34,453	100
Democratic gain from Republican			

2024 Michigan House of Representatives election
Party	Candidate	Votes	%
Republican	Kathy Schmaltz (incumbent)	21,563	52.07
Democratic	Daniel J. Mahoney	19,851	47.93
Total votes		41,414	100
Republican hold			

2022 Michigan House of Representatives election
Party	Candidate	Votes	%
Republican	Kathy Schmaltz	16,806	54.37
Democratic	Maurice Imhoff	14,104	45.63
Total votes		30,910	100
Republican hold			

2020 Michigan House of Representatives election
Party	Candidate	Votes	%
Republican	John Reilly (incumbent)	36,259	62.01
Democratic	Jody LaMacchia	22,214	37.99
Total votes		58,473	100
Republican hold			

=== 2010s ===
2018 Michigan House of Representatives election
Party	Candidate	Votes	%
Republican	John Reilly	26,786	60.0
Democratic	Mindy Denninger	17,898	40.1
Total votes		44,684	100
Republican hold			

2016 Michigan House of Representatives election
Party	Candidate	Votes	%
Republican	John Reilly	33,073	69.3
Democratic	David Jay Lillis	14,642	30.7
Total votes		47,715	100.00%
Republican hold			

2014 Michigan House of Representatives election
Party	Candidate	Votes	%
Republican	Bradford Jacobsen	21,513	69.2
Democratic	David Lillis	9,597	30.9
Total votes		31,110	100.0
Republican hold			

2012 Michigan House of Representatives election
Party	Candidate	Votes	%
Republican	Bradford Jacobsen	27,764	63.7
Democratic	Daniel Sargent	15,810	36.3
Total votes		43,574	100.0
Republican hold			

2010 Michigan House of Representatives election
Party	Candidate	Votes	%
Republican	Bradford Jacobsen	24,364	72.5
Democratic	David Jay Lillis	9,240	27.5
Total votes		33,604	100.0
Republican hold			

2008 Michigan House of Representatives election
Party	Candidate	Votes	%
Republican	James Marleau	29,263	60.6
Democratic	Katherine Houston	19,045	39.4
Total votes		48,308	100.0
Republican hold			
