= Joe Hune =

American politician from Michigan

Member of the Michigan Senate from the 22nd district
- In office January 1, 2011 – December 31, 2018
- Preceded by: Valde Garcia
- Succeeded by: Lana Theis

Member of the Michigan House of Representatives from the 47th district
- In office January 1, 2003 – December 31, 2008
- Preceded by: Rose Bogardus
- Succeeded by: Cindy Denby

Personal details
- Born: May 29, 1980 (age 46)
- Party: Republican
- Spouse: Marcia Hune
- Occupation: Politician
- Website: State Sen. Joe Hune

Joe Hune (born May 29, 1980) is a politician from the U.S. state of Michigan.

== Education ==
Hune received his education from the following institutions:

- Graduated, Fowlerville Community Schools, 1998
- Graduated, B.S. Financial Planning, Cleary University
- Attended, Agricultural Business/Animal Science, Michigan State University
- Attended, Lansing Community College

== Organizations ==
Hune has been a member to the following organizations:

- Member, Howell Jaycees
- Member, Livingston County 4-H
- Member, Livingston Association of Realtors
- Member, Livingston County Farm Bureau
- Member, Michigan Association of Realtors
- Member, St. Agnes Church

== Professional experience ==
Hune has had the following professional experience:

- Page, Michigan State House of Representatives, 1998
- Agricultural Business Owner
- Journal Clerk, Michigan State House of Representatives
- Livestock Judge
- Real Estate Agent

Hune had two terms as Michigan's 22nd District State Senator, a district which covers Livingston County (Brighton Township, Cohoctah, Conway, Deerfield, Genoa, Green Oak, Hamburg, Handy, Hartland Township, Howell Township, Iosco Marion, Oceola, Putnam, Tyron and Unadilla, the villages of Hartland, Hell, Fowlerville, Lakeland, Parshallville, Pinckney, and Whitmore Lake and the cities of Brighton and Howell) and Western Washtenaw County, (Bridgewater, Dexter Township, Freedom, Lima, Lodi, Lyndon, Manchester, Northfield, Saline Township, Scio, Sharon, Sylvan and Webster, the village of Manchester and the Cities of Chelsea and Dexter.) He last served as chairperson of the Senate Agriculture and Insurance Committees and on the Michigan Senate Health Policy, Regulatory Reform and Energy and technology committees.

First elected to the Michigan Senate in 2010 he took office in January 2011 as Michigan's 22nd District State Senator, a district which covered Livingston County and a portion of Southern Ingham County. Hune was appointed as chairperson of the Senate Agriculture, Insurance and Redistricting committees, and serves on the Health Policy and Regulatory Reform committee.

Before become a state senator, Hune was in the Michigan House of Representatives from Michigan's 47th district Livingston County Partial. First elected in 2002 to the Michigan House of Representatives at the age of 22, Hune lost by one vote after a re-count.

Hune is a vocal supporter of Donald Trump.

== See also ==
- Illegal immigration
