= Henry Vaupel =

American politician

Member of the Michigan House of Representatives from the 47th district
- In office January 1, 2015 – January 1, 2021
- Preceded by: Cindy Denby
- Succeeded by: Bob Bezotte

Personal details
- Born: December 11, 1943 (age 82) Detroit, Michigan
- Party: Republican

Henry M. Vaupel (born December 11, 1943) is an American politician who has served in the Michigan House of Representatives from the 47th district since 2015.
