= Michael Switalski =

American politician from Michigan

Member of the Michigan Senate from the 10th district
- In office January 1, 2003 – December 31, 2010
- Preceded by: Art Miller, Jr.
- Succeeded by: Tory Rocca

Member of the Michigan House of Representatives from the 27th district
- In office January 1999 – December 2002
- Succeeded by: Andy Meisner

Personal details
- Born: January 11, 1955 (age 71) Hamtramck, Michigan
- Party: Democratic
- Spouse: Roma Heaney
- Occupation: journalist, labor relations

Michael N. "Mickey" Switalski (born January 11, 1955) is a politician from the U.S. state of Michigan. He was a Democratic member of the Michigan Senate, representing the 10th district from 2003 to 2011. His district is located in central Macomb County and includes the cities of Sterling Heights and Roseville. Previously he was a member of the Michigan House of Representatives from 1999 to 2003.

== Early life ==
Switalski graduated from Roseville High School in 1973. He graduated from Louisiana State University in 1977 with a bachelor's degree in Classical Languages, and in 1981 earned a master's degree in History. He graduated from the University of Aberdeen in Scotland in 1982 with an M. Litt. in Politics.

== Career ==
Switalski worked as a sports editor for the Utica Advisor and C&G Newspapers, and contributed to the Detroit Free Press and the Kansas City Star. He served as the Chief of Labor Relations at the Detroit Arsenal Tank Plant from 1985 to 1993.

Switalski was elected to the Roseville City Council in 1989 and was elected Macomb County Commissioner in 1992. In 1998, he was elected to the Michigan State House of Representatives, representing the 27th district. In 2002, he was elected to the Michigan State Senate. He was re-elected in 2006. On March 22, 2009, Switalski announced that he will challenge U.S Representative from the 12th district Sander Levin for the Democratic ticket of this position. In the August 3, 2010 primary Sander Levin defeated Switalski by approximately 3 to 1.

In 2013, Switalski served the city of Roseville as its treasurer, until 2017.

== Personal life ==
Switalski married Roma Heaney in Glasgow, Scotland in 1985. He has a son, Liam, who was born in 1993. They live in Roseville, Michigan.
