= Rylee Linting =

American politician (born 2002)

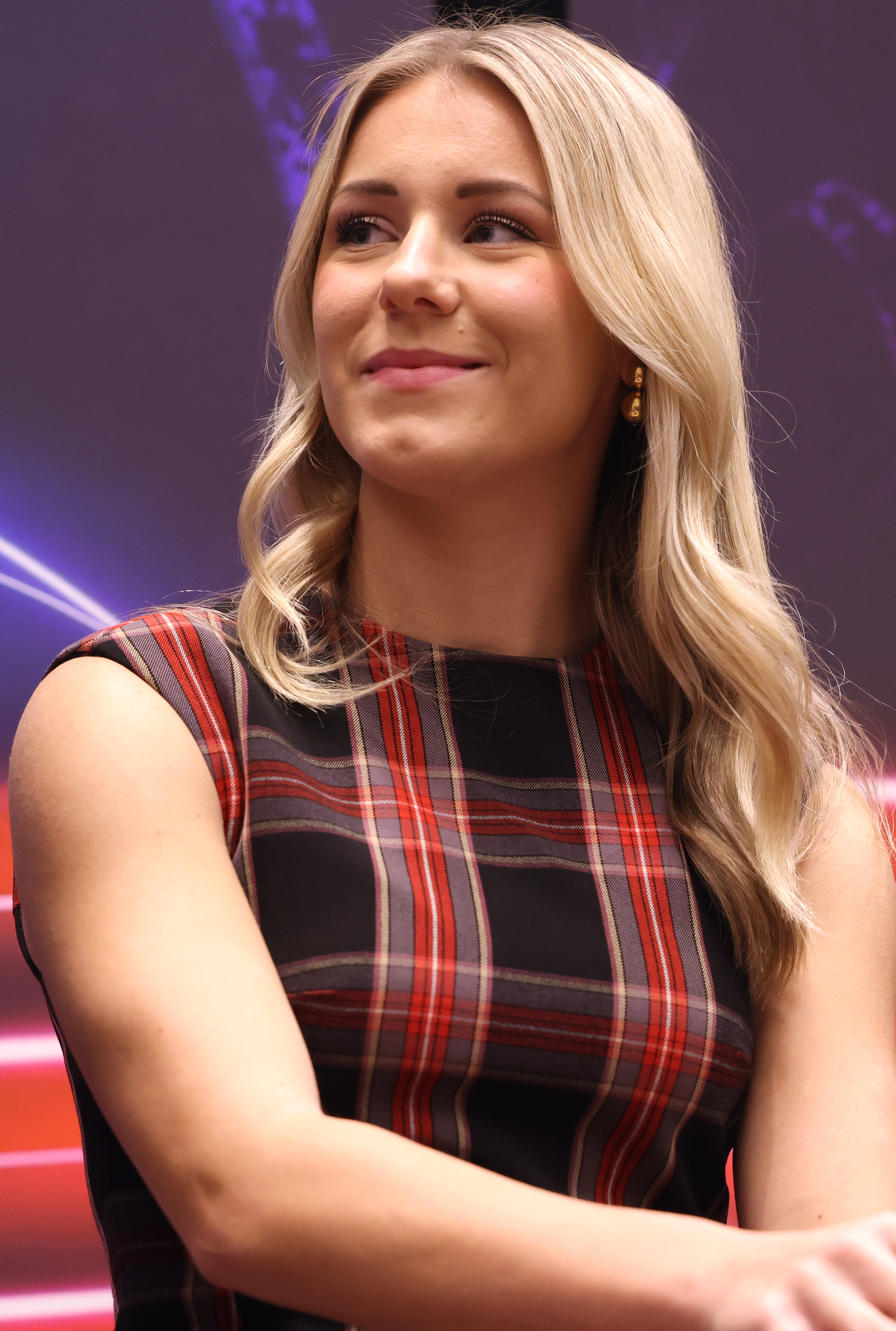
- Linting in 2024

Member of the Michigan House of Representatives from the 27th district
- Incumbent
- Assumed office January 1, 2025
- Preceded by: Jaime Churches

Personal details
- Born: 2001 or 2002 (age 24–25) Wyandotte, Michigan
- Party: Republican

Rylee Linting (born 2001 or 2002) is an American politician serving as a member of the Michigan House of Representatives since January 2025, representing the 27th district. A member of the Republican Party, Linting worked as a field representative for Turning Point Action, and previously served as the youth vice chair of the Michigan Republican Party.

== Early life and education ==
Linting was born in Wyandotte, Michigan, in 2001 or 2002. She graduated from Grosse Ile High School in 2020 and attended Grand Valley State University, where she said she "faced indoctrination, vaccination mandates and woke student culture." She transferred to online courses at Liberty University during the COVID-19 pandemic, where she was still taking courses as of March 2025.

== Political career ==
Linting worked as a field representative for Turning Point Action and previously served as the youth vice chair of the Michigan Republican Party.

=== Michigan House of Representatives ===
In the 2024 Michigan House of Representatives election, Linting was elected to represent the 27th district, defeating Democratic incumbent Jaime Churches.

Required transparency submissions by lobbyists revealed they had purchased Linting more than $5,000 in meals in 2025, the sixth highest total in the state that year.

In the 2026 Michigan House of Representatives election, Linton lost re-election to the 27th district, having been defeated by Churches.

== Personal life ==
Linting attends non-denominational Metro City Church and Lutheran Christ the King Church. As of March 2025, she has a six-year old sister and a 21-year-old brother who works as a staker with DTE Energy.
