= Andy Meisner =

American politician from Michigan

Oakland County Treasurer
- In office July 1, 2009 – June 30, 2021
- Preceded by: Pat Dohany
- Succeeded by: Robert Wittenberg

Member of the Michigan House of Representatives from the 27th district
- In office January 1, 2003 – January 1, 2009
- Preceded by: Michael Switalski
- Succeeded by: Ellen Lipton

Personal details
- Party: Democratic

Andrew Meisner (born March 30, 1973) is a politician from Huntington Woods, Michigan. He is a former Democratic Party member of the Michigan State House of Representatives. He served as the Oakland County Treasurer from 2009 to 2021. Meisner was a candidate for Oakland County Executive in 2020, but was defeated in the August Democratic primary.

== Early life ==
While in college, Meisner was an aide to Congressmen Sander Levin and David Obey. After graduating, he became Congressman Levin's policy analyst for issues concerning criminal justice, mental health, unemployment insurance, and foreign affairs. Meisner was then elected vice president of the national, non-profit Drug-Free Kids Campaign, or CADCA. He is Jewish.

In 2001, Meisner returned to Michigan to work as a corporate communications director for a real estate firm.

== Political career ==
Meisner was elected to the Michigan House of Representatives in 2002. Since then he has become the Assistant Democratic Leader and the Vice-Chair of the House Commerce Committee and Ethics, Oversight and Campaign Finance Committee, and serving as a member of the Tax Policy Committee.

Meisner was awarded the "Rising Star Award" in 2005 from the 21st Century Democrats. Meisner is an advocate for easing restrictions on embryonic stem cell research.

After serving the maximum number of 3 terms in the State House under term limits, in November 2008, Meisner successfully ran against the incumbent Oakland County Treasurer.

In September 2009, Governor Granholm named Meisner to the Michigan Land Bank Fast Track Authority

In November 2012, Meisner ran for re-election against term-limited State Representative Marty Knollenberg (R)-Troy, winning by 7 points.

In 2020, Meisner was a candidate for Oakland County Executive, but lost in the August Democratic primary.

== Electoral history ==
Oakland County Executive Democratic primary election, 2020
Party	Candidate	Votes	%
Democratic	Dave Coulter (incumbent)	109,761	53.96
Democratic	Andy Meisner	93,475	45.95
	Write-In	178	0.09
Total votes		203,414	100

Oakland County Executive Democratic special primary election, 2020
Party	Candidate	Votes	%
Democratic	Dave Coulter (incumbent)	112,679	56.02
Democratic	Andy Meisner	88,256	43.87
	Write-In	219	0.11
Total votes		201,154	100

Oakland County Treasurer general election, 2016
Party	Candidate	Votes	%
Democratic	Andy Meisner (incumbent)	333,826	54.30
Republican	John P. McCulloch	278,971	45.38
	Write-In	1,986	0.32
Total votes		614,783	100

Oakland County Treasurer general election, 2012
Party	Candidate	Votes	%
Democratic	Andy Meisner (incumbent)	319,816	53.36
Republican	Marty Knollenberg	277,128	46.24
	Write-In	2,386	0.40
Total votes		599,330	100

Oakland County Treasurer general election, 2008
Party	Candidate	Votes	%
Democratic	Andy Meisner	306,062	52.11
Republican	Pat Dohany (incumbent)	278,666	47.45
	Write-In	2,575	0.40
Total votes		587,303	100

Michigan House of Representatives 27th District general election, 2006
Party	Candidate	Votes	%
Democratic	Andy Meisner (incumbent)	27,285	78.89
Republican	Will Sears	7,303	21.11
Total votes		34,588	100

Michigan House of Representatives 27th District general election, 2004
Party	Candidate	Votes	%
Democratic	Andy Meisner (incumbent)	32,477	73.10
Republican	William Axtell	10,755	24.23
Libertarian	Lloyd W. Sherman	1,188	2.68
Total votes		44,390	100

Michigan House of Representatives 27th District general election, 2002
Party	Candidate	Votes	%
Democratic	Andy Meisner	21,037	73.10
Republican	Keith P. Sanford	7,927	26.57
Green	Art Myatt	875	2.93
Total votes		29,839	100

Michigan House of Representatives 27th District Democratic primary election, 2002
Party	Candidate	Votes	%
Democratic	Andy Meisner	7,539	51.63
Democratic	Simon I. Galed	2,605	17.82
Democratic	Justen Grech	2,522	17.25
Democratic	Jeff Jenks	1,946	13.31
Total votes		14,622	100
