= Rick Baxter =

American politician

Rick Isaiah Baxter

Member of the Michigan House of Representatives from the 64th district
- In office January 1, 2005 – December 31, 2006
- Preceded by: Clark Bisbee
- Succeeded by: Martin Griffin

Personal details
- Born: July 18, 1979 (age 47) (United States) Jackson County U.S.
- Children: Isaac Isaiah, Rachel Ann, Seth Alexander, & Alexander Edward
- Occupation: Businessman, Politician, and Fmr. Chairman of the Jackson County Republican Party

Rick Baxter (born July 18, 1979) is an American businessman and politician from Michigan. He currently is the Chief Operating Officer (COO) of Baxter Machine & Tool Co., Inc. in Jackson, Michigan.

Baxter's previous positions have been the chairman of the Jackson County Republican Party, the Business Development Director for his family's company Baxter Machine & Tool Co., Inc. in Jackson, Michigan, district director for Congressman Tim Walberg (R-MI) (2007), Republican State Representative in the Michigan House of Representatives (2005–2006), County Commissioner for Jackson County, Michigan (2003–2004), and holding several positions, most recently as Chief Financial Officer (CFO), for Baxter Machine & Tool Co., Inc. (1997–2004).

Baxter is a member of a local Churches of Christ congregation where he has taught a Bible class and has served as their Treasurer since 2005. He has also been a guest preacher at his and other churches. Rick Baxter is a graduate of Lenawee Christian School in Adrian, Michigan (1997) and received his Bachelor of Arts degree (BA) from Spring Arbor University in Spring Arbor, Michigan (2003).

== Elections and public service ==
Baxter's first campaign was in 2002 when he ran for the Jackson County (Michigan) Commission. He defeated the two-term incumbent Republican county commissioner in the primary and went on to win the seat, unopposed, in November.

In 2004, Baxter ran for an open seat for State Representative. He defeated two other Republicans in the primary. Baxter won a very tight general election, winning by 358 votes out of a total of 37,714.

As State Representative Baxter had 14 bills signed into law. In the summer of 2005 he published a controversial article in the Wall Street Journal titled "How to Skin a Wolverine." The article caught the ire of then Governor Jennifer Granholm who labeled his views "treasonous." During both years in the Michigan House he was rated by Inside Michigan Politics as "The Most Conservative Freshman" in the Michigan Legislature, rated second Most Conservative in the entire State in 2006.

For his next re-election, Baxter won the primary with over 65% of the vote but went on to lose his re-election bid in the general. Both parties combined spent almost 1.5 million dollars in this race that year.

In 2008 Baxter ran for the open seat of Jackson County Treasurer, but lost the election in November.

== Party chair ==
Baxter served as chair of the Jackson County Republican Party from 2007 to 2008. During that time he was credited for fundamentally reorganizing the local party, rewriting their by-laws, consolidating their committees, and removed prominent inactive members with active new ones. He secured Karl Rove as the keynote speaker for the party's major fundraiser of the year, the Lincoln Day Dinner, an event that raised over $20,000, well over double what any preceding event had raised.

In 2008 he has started to organize the Party to work more closely with candidates, at all levels, to share costs, strategies, and resources. In June 2008, Baxter resigned his position as chair to run for Jackson County Treasurer.

In 2008, Baxter was awarded "Republican of the Year" by the Jackson County Republican Party.

== Businessman ==
Baxter's business career started after he graduated in 1997 from Lenawee Christian School in Adrian, Michigan. He began working in the summer of 1997 as a CAD Tech/Accounting Assistant and worked his way up to Chief Financial Officer (CFO) in 2003. He left the company at the end of 2004 to become State Representative.

In October 2007, he left his position as district director for Congressman Tim Walberg to rejoin the family business as their Business Development Director. In this position he handled Baxter Machine's business development, sales, and customer relations.

In November 2008 he founded Driven Motors, a used vehicle dealership based solely online. The business grew from there and added a physical presence in Jackson by the summer of 2010. In late 2010, Driven Motors added a vehicle repair facility for both its dealership and open to the public. By early 2011, the company doubled its capacity and doubled its staff.

By 2014, Driven Motors has grown to offer vehicle sales and financing, auto salvage, auto repair, and auto detailing.

In July 2014, he returned to his family's business, Baxter Machine, as its Chief Operating Officer (COO) after his brother, holding a similar position, left the company. In 2015 he sold off his remaining interest in Driven Motors.

== Electoral history ==
- 2008 Jackson County Treasurer General Election
  - Rick Baxter (R), 44.9%
  - Karen Coffman (D), 54.5%
- 2006 State House (64) General Election
  - Rick Baxter (R), 47.4%
  - Martin Griffin (D), 52.6%
- 2006 State House (64) Primary Election
  - Rick Baxter (R), 65.3%
  - Bob Ross (R), 34.7%
- 2004 State House (64) General Election
  - Rick Baxter (R), 49.8%
  - Martin Griffin (D), 48.8%
  - Bob Ross Write-In, 1.3%
- 2004 State House (64) Primary Election
  - Rick Baxter (R), 44.3%
  - Bob Ross (R), 28.8%
  - Jon Williams (R), 26.8%
- 2002 Jackson County Commission (05) Primary Election
  - Rick Baxter (R), 40.2%
  - Alan Miltich (R), 32.4%
  - Judy Reynolds (R), 23.0%
  - Trish O'Shea (R), 4.4%
