= Earl Poleski =

American politician

Member of the Michigan House of Representatives from the 64th district
- In office January 1, 2011 – January 1, 2017
- Preceded by: Martin Griffin
- Succeeded by: Julie Alexander

Personal details
- Party: Republican
- Spouse: Candy Poleski
- Education: Albion College, Walsh College

Earl Poleski is an American political figure who served as a member of the Michigan House of Representatives from a district covering Jackson, Michigan and surrounding areas. He has a bachelor's degree from Albion College and a master's degree from Walsh College.

Poleski worked for several years as a CPA. He was first elected to the state house in 2010. Poleski was appointed to the position of executive director of the Michigan State Housing Development Authority (MSHDA) on February 22, 2017, by Governor Rick Snyder. On March 28, 2019, he was removed from his position as executive director of MHSDA, by vote of its board of directors.

== Electoral history ==
2010 2010 64th District Primary
Party	Candidate	Votes	%
Republican	Earl Poleski	5,325	57.4%
Republican	Jane Grover	3,951	42.6%
Majority		1,375	14.8%

2010 2010 64th District Michigan House Election
Party	Candidate	Votes	%	±%
Republican	Earl Poleski	15,649	59.2%	+18.9%
democratic Party (United States)	Martin J. Griffin (I)	10,777	40.8%	-21.9%
Majority		4,872	18.4%	-7%

2012 2012 64th District Primary
Party	Candidate	Votes	%
Republican	Earl Poleski (I)	7,472	100%
Majority		—	—

2012 2012 64th District Michigan House Election
Party	Candidate	Votes	%	±%
Republican	Earl Poleski (I)	20,190	56.2%	-3%
democratic Party (United States)	Barbara Shelton	15,729	43.8%	+3%
Majority		4,461	12.4%	-6%
Republican hold

== Sources ==
- State House bio of Poleski
