= Michigan's 47th House of Representatives district =

American legislative district

Michigan's 47th State House of Representatives district
Representative
Carrie Rheingans; D–Ann Arbor
- Demographics: 82.9% White; 2.5% Black; 4.8% Hispanic; 3.7% Asian; 0.2% Native American; 0.7% Other; 5.3% Multiracial
- Population (2024): 91,400

Michigan's 47th House of Representatives district is a legislative district within the Michigan House of Representatives located in Calhoun County. The district was created in 1965, when the Michigan Supreme Court ordered the reapportionment of state legislative districts from a county-based system to a proportional one following the Supreme Court case Reynolds v. Sims. It is currently represented by Democrat Carrie Rheingans of Ann Arbor.

== List of representatives ==
Representative	Party	Years	Residence	Notes
Cyril H. Root	Republican	1965–1968	Kalamazoo	
Wayne B. Sackett	Republican	1969–1972	Portage	
Jack Welborn	Republican	1973–1974	Kalamazoo	Resigned, elected Michigan Senate.
Robert A. Welborn	Republican	1974–1982	Kalamazoo	
Paul Wartner	Republican	1983–1990	Portage	
Dale L. Shugars	Republican	1991–1992	Portage	
Sandra J. Hill	Republican	1993–1996	Montrose	
Rose Bogardus	Democratic	1997–2002	Davison	
Joe Hune	Republican	2003–2008	Hamburg Township	Lived in Fowlerville until around 2007.
Cindy Denby	Republican	2009–2014	Handy Township	Lived in Fowlerville until around 2011.
Henry Vaupel	Republican	2015–2020	Fowlerville	
Bob Bezotte	Republican	2021–2022	Howell	
Carrie Rheingans	Democratic	2023–present	Ann Arbor	

== Historical district boundaries ==
Map	Description	Apportionment Plan	Notes
	Kalamazoo County (part): Alamo Township; Charleston Township (part); Cooper Township; Kalamazoo (part); Kalamazoo Township; Parchment; Portage; Oshtemo Township; Richland Township; Ross Township	1964 Apportionment Plan	
	Kalamazoo County (part): Alamo Township; Cooper Township; Kalamazoo (part); Parchment; Portage (part); Prairie Ronde Township; Oshtemo Township; Schoolcraft Township; Texas Township	1972 Apportionment Plan	
	Kalamazoo County (part): Alamo Township; Cooper Township; Kalamazoo Township (part); Parchment; Portage; Prairie Ronde Township; Oshtemo Township; Schoolcraft Township; Texas Township	1982 Apportionment Plan	
	Genesee County (part): Atlas Township; Clio; Davison; Davison Township; Flushing; Flushing Township; Forest Township; Montrose; Montrose Township; Richfield Township; Thetford Township; Vienna Township	1992 Apportionment Plan	
	Livingston County (part): Cohoctah Township; Conway Township; Deerfield Township; Hamburg Township; Handy Township; Hartland Township; Howell; Howell Township; Iosco Township; Marion Township (part); Putnam Township; Tyrone Township; Unadilla Township	2001 Apportionment Plan	
	Livingston County (part): Cohoctah Township; Conway Township; Deerfield Township; Fenton (part); Handy Township; Hartland Township; Howell; Howell Township; Iosco Township; Marion Township; Tyrone Township; Unadilla Township	2011 Apportionment Plan	
	Jackson County (part): Columbia Township; Grass Lake Charter Township (part); Napoleon Township; Norvell Township; Summit Township (part); Washtenaw County (part): Ann Arbor (part); Ann Arbor Charter Township (part); Dexter; Freedom Township (part); Lima Township; Manchester Township; Scio Township (part); Sharon Township (part); Sylvan Township (part)	2021 Apportionment Plan (Note: Referred to as the Hickory plan.)	

== Recent elections ==
=== 2020s ===
2026 Michigan House of Representatives election
Party	Candidate	Votes	%
Democratic	Carrie A. Rheingans (incumbent)	34,889	65.78
Republican	Justin Griffis	18,152	34.22
Total votes		53,041	100
Democratic hold			

2024 Michigan House of Representatives election
Party	Candidate	Votes	%
Democratic	Carrie A. Rheingans (incumbent)	35,216	60.13
Republican	Teresa Spiegelberg	22,255	38
Green	Aaron Wright	1,093	1.87
Total votes		58,564	100
Democratic hold			

2022 Michigan House of Representatives election
Party	Candidate	Votes	%
Democratic	Carrie A. Rheingans	31,552	63.44
Republican	Tina Bednarski-Lynch	18,187	36.56
Total votes		49,739	100
Democratic gain from Republican			

2020 Michigan House of Representatives election
Party	Candidate	Votes	%
Republican	Robert J. Bezotte	40,449	68.73
Democratic	Adam Smiddy	18,407	31.27
Total votes		58,856	100
Republican hold			

=== 2010s ===
2018 Michigan House of Representatives election
Party	Candidate	Votes	%
Republican	Hank Vaupel	28,948	66.42
Democratic	Colleen Turk	14,638	33.58
Total votes		43,586	100
Republican hold			

2016 Michigan House of Representatives election
Party	Candidate	Votes	%
Republican	Henry Vaupel	32,616	68.17%
Democratic	Keith Van Houten	12,918	27.00%
Libertarian	Rodger Young	2,314	4.84%
Total votes		47,848	100.00%
Republican hold			

2014 Michigan House of Representatives election
Party	Candidate	Votes	%
Republican	Henry Vaupel	20,995	69.11
Democratic	Jordan Genso	8,086	26.62
Libertarian	Rodger Young	1,300	4.28
Total votes		30,381	100.0
Republican hold			

2012 Michigan House of Representatives election
Party	Candidate	Votes	%
Republican	Cindy Denby	27,621	64.06
Democratic	Shawn Lowe Desai	13,888	32.21
Libertarian	James Weeks	1,607	3.73
Total votes		43,116	100.0
Republican hold			

2010 Michigan House of Representatives election
Party	Candidate	Votes	%
Republican	Cindy Denby	22,448	69.62
Democratic	Garry Post	9,794	30.38
Total votes		32,242	100.0
Republican hold			

2008 Michigan House of Representatives election
Party	Candidate	Votes	%
Republican	Cindy Denby	27,851	59.02
Democratic	Scott Lucas	17,059	36.15
Libertarian	Rodger Young	1,347	2.85
Constitution	Philip Johnson	929	1.97
Total votes		47,186	100.0
Republican hold			
