= Robert Wittenberg =

American politician from Michigan

Oakland County Treasurer
- Incumbent
- Assumed office July 1, 2021
- Preceded by: Andy Meisner

Member of the Michigan House of Representatives from the 27th district
- In office January 1, 2015 – January 1, 2021
- Preceded by: Ellen Lipton
- Succeeded by: Regina Weiss

Personal details
- Party: Democratic
- Education: Indiana University Kelley School of Business

Robert S. Wittenberg (born 1981) is an American politician serving as the treasurer of Oakland County, Michigan since 2021. A member of the Democratic Party, Wittenberg previously represented the 27th District in the Michigan House of Representatives from 2015 to 2020.

== Career ==
Wittenberg graduated from Berkley High school and earned a Bachelor of Science in Business Management at the Kelley School of Business, Indiana University Bloomington. He worked as a licensed insurance agent specializing in health care.

He was first elected in 2014, defeating Republican candidate Michael Ryan. During that term he was minority vice chairman of the House Financial Liability Reform Committee and served on the House Insurance and Health Policy committees.

In June 2016 Wittenberg became the founding chairperson of the Michigan Gun Violence Prevention Caucus and later that year sponsored a bill to ban assault weapons.

He re-contested the 2016 election, beating Republican challenger Kyle Forrest with a slightly increased majority. He named increasing funding for public schools as one of his priorities for the new term.

== Electoral history ==
Oakland County Treasurer general election, 2020
Party	Candidate	Votes	%
Democratic	Robert Wittenberg	387,216	53.73
Republican	Joe Kent	332,587	46.15
	Write-In	797	0.11
	Nicholas G. Luppino (Write-In)	14	0.00
Total votes		720,614	100

Oakland County Treasurer Democratic primary election, 2020
Party	Candidate	Votes	%
Democratic	Robert Wittenberg	125,437	68.49
Democratic	Robert J. Corbett, Jr.	57,339	31.31
	Write-In	372	0.20
Total votes		183,148	100
