= Jan Maino =

American politician

Member-elect of the Michigan House of Representatives from the 46th district
- Assuming office January 1, 2027
- Succeeding: Kathy Schmaltz

Personal details
- Party: Democratic
- Education: Eastern Michigan University
- Website: Campaign website

Jan Maino is an American politician who is the member-elect for the 46th district of the Michigan House of Representatives. She was elected at the 2026 election. She is president of the East Jackson Board of Education.
