= Andrew Beeler =

American politician

Member of the Michigan House of Representatives
- In office January 1, 2021 – December 31, 2024
- Preceded by: Shane Hernandez
- Succeeded by: Joseph G. Pavlov
- Constituency: 83rd district (2021–2022); 64th district (2023–2024)

Personal details
- Born: 1992 (age 33–34) Port Huron, Michigan, U.S.
- Party: Republican
- Education: United States Naval Academy (BS)

Military service
- Branch: United States Navy
- Service years: 2010–2019
- Rank: Lieutenant

Andrew Beeler (born 1992) is an American politician and former United States Navy officer who served as a member of the Michigan House of Representatives from 2021 to 2024.

== Early life and education ==
Beeler was born and raised in Port Huron, Michigan. After graduating from Cardinal Mooney Catholic High School, he accepted an appointment to the United States Naval Academy, where he earned a Bachelor of Science degree in naval architecture.

== Career ==
After graduating from the Naval Academy, Beeler was commissioned as an ensign in 2014. A surface warfare officer, he was assigned to the USS Chancellorsville and USS Decatur. Beeler was deployed to the South China Sea and Middle East before receiving a discharge from the Navy in 2019. Beeler then returned to Port Huron and became a candidate for the Michigan House of Representatives to represent the 83rd district. He was elected in November 2020 and assumed office on January 1, 2021. Following redistricting, in the 2022 election, Beeler was re-elected to represent the 64th district. Beeler did not seek re-election in 2024. He was succeeded in the state House by Joseph G. Pavlov.
