= Kathy Schmaltz =

American politician

Member of the Michigan House of Representatives from the 46th district
- Incumbent
- Assumed office January 1, 2023
- Preceded by: John Reilly
- Succeeded by: Jan Maino (elect)

Personal details
- Party: Republican
- Education: Michigan State University

Kathy Schmaltz is an American politician serving as a member of the Michigan House of Representatives since 2023, representing the 46th district. She is a member of the Republican Party.

Schmaltz is a Michigan State University graduate and was a news anchor at Lansing's WILX-TV for 14 years, and was a radio broadcaster before that.

Schmaltz has served on the board of Easter Seals of Michigan, Michigan Dyslexia Institute, United Way of Jackson, Big Brothers Big Sisters, Wendy's Charity Classic for Adoption, Henry Ford Jackson Hospital Foundation, Purple Rose Theatre in Chelsea, 100 Women Who Care, Michigan Theatre of Jackson, and Good Shepherd Catholic Radio. She chairs the Jackson Grand Slam for Kids board.

== Political career ==
She was elected to the Michigan House of Representatives from the 46th district in the 2022 election. She was reelected in 2024. Currently Schmaltz sits on four committees in the Michigan House of Representatives. She is a standing member of the House Energy, Health Policy, and Communication and Technology Committees. She is currently the chair of the House Families and Veterans Committee.

Schmaltz has sponsored and co-sponsored numerous bills in the Michigan Legislature. One major bill that she has worked on is HB 4750, a bill created to help preserve foster care benefits for children in the system after they turn 18. Other bill packages that she is working on include guardianship reform, which ensures proper licensure of guardians, establishing hyperbaric oxygen therapy for veterans, and many others.
