= Bob Bezotte =

American politician (born 1950)

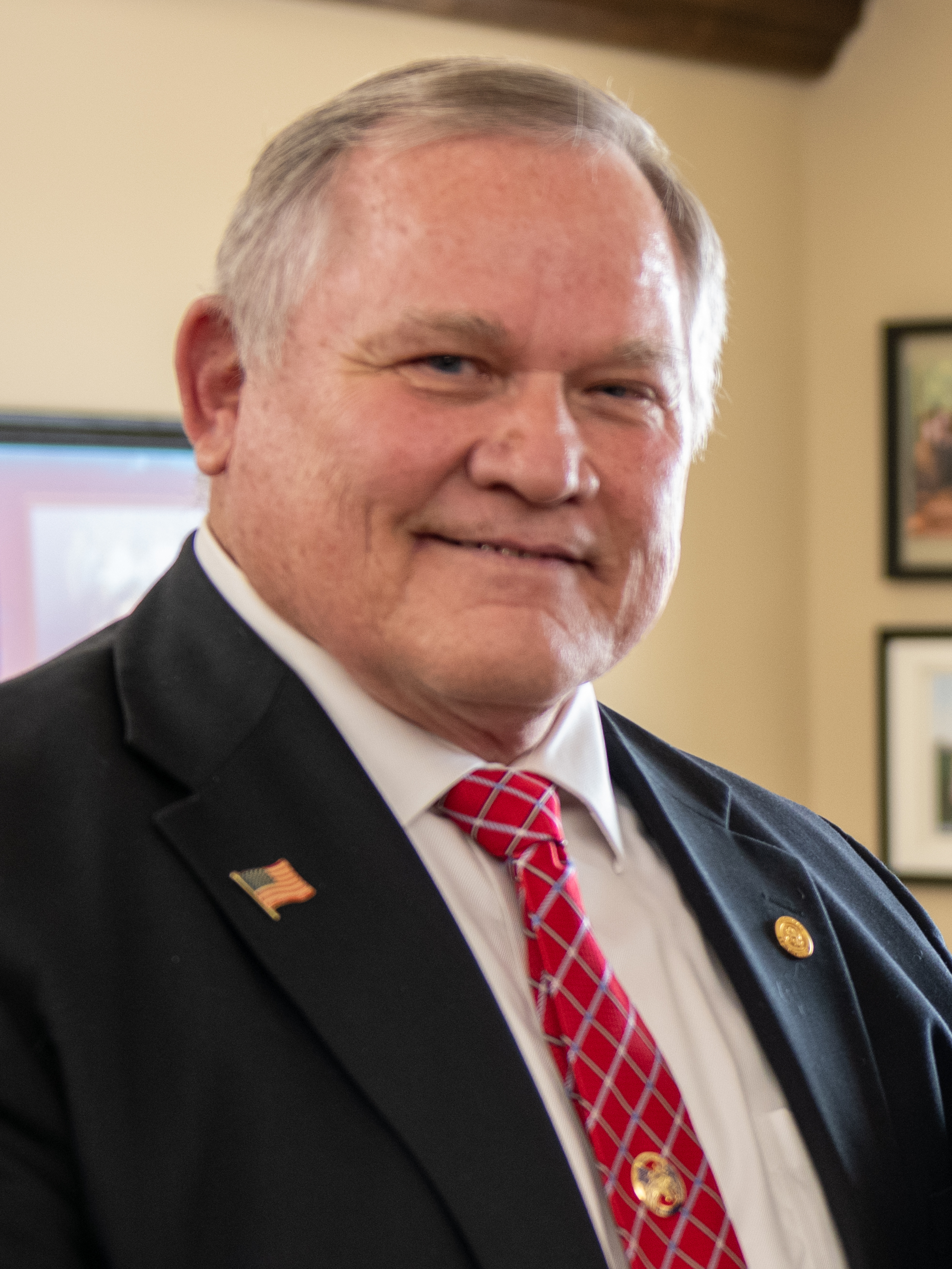

Member of the Michigan House of Representatives
- In office January 1, 2021 – December 31, 2024
- Preceded by: Henry Vaupel
- Succeeded by: Jason Woolford
- Constituency: 47th district (2019–2022); 50th district (2023–2024)

Personal details
- Born: October 15, 1950 (age 75) Detroit, Michigan
- Party: Republican
- Education: Eastern Michigan University; FBI National Academy
- Website: Bob Bezotte

Military service
- Allegiance: United States Army
- Battles/wars: Vietnam War

Robert J. Bezotte (born October 15, 1950) is a Michigan politician and former member of the Michigan House of Representatives serving from 2021 to 2025 and was originally elected to the 47th district. In the 2022 Michigan House of Representatives election, he was elected in District 50 due to redistricting.

== Early life and education ==
Bezotte was born on October 15, 1950, in Detroit. Bezotte attended both Eastern Michigan University and the FBI National Academy.

== Career ==
Bezotte is a United States Army veteran who served in the Vietnam War. From 1987 to 1997, Bezotte worked a corporate security assignment for Domino's Pizza as security director. Bezotte's first job in law enforcement was as a corrections deputy. Bezotte later worked as both a road patrol deputy and a detective. Bezotte was working as undersheriff when, in 2005, he was elected as sheriff of Livingston County. Bezotte endorsed Mitt Romney in the 2008 presidential election. During his tenure as sheriff, the Livingston Sheriff Department put "In God We Trust" decals on police patrol cars, a controversial move which garnered the department criticism from the Freedom From Religion Foundation. In January 2016, after serving three terms, Bezotte confirmed that he would not be seeking re-election as sheriff, effectively retiring. Bezotte endorsed his undersheriff, Michael Murphy, to succeed him. Bezotte has 33 years of law enforcement experience all together.

Bezotte had a number of email disputes with Livingston County Commissioners. On December 15, 2015, Commission Vice Chairwoman Carol Griffin sent an email explaining the commission's decision not to include a cost-of-living increase to county employees' paychecks in the 2016 budget. She cited reasons for not increasing payment to employees due to a lack of monetary inflation and an uncertainty about expansion in jail operation costs. On January 13, 2016, Bezotte sent a response email, voicing his disagreements, where he claimed that the commission underfunded the sheriff's department, resulting in considerable downsizing. Commissioner Steve Williams, with whom Bezotte has a long-standing rivalry, claimed that Bezotte was willfully ignorant of the budget realities of the county, as he had been absent from budget meetings for two years. Williams disagreed with Bezotte's negative characterization of county employees' pay. Bezotte claimed that he stopped attending county meetings due to a loss of faith in them, but Williams insinuated that Bezotte stopped attending the meetings after being questioned on a number of county policy violations Bezotte committed. Bezotte began to consider running for the county commission seat held by Williams. Williams said that if Bezotte decided to run, he wanted to make the number of lawsuits made against the county under Bezotte's tenure as sheriff the main subject of his re-election campaign.

On April 1, 2016, Bezotte announced that he was running for the Livingston County Commission seat representing the 6th district. On August 2, 2016, Bezotte defeated Williams' attempt at re-election in the Republican primary. On November 8, 2016, Bezotte won election to the county commission unopposed. Bezotte was re-elected to the commission in 2018.

On October 23, 2017, Bezotte shared a meme on Facebook about congresswomen Maxine Waters and Frederica Wilson, calling them "despicable hags" who needed to be thrown out of office. During a county meeting on December 5, 2017, Bezotte faced criticism by the Livingston County Democratic Party for the meme, including accusations of sexism and racism. Bezotte denied the accusations of bigotry, but did ultimately apologize for the use of the word "hags".

On December 14, 2018, Bezotte was appointed by the Livingston County Commission to serve a four-year term on the Veterans' Services Committee. In February 2020, Commissioner Bezotte developed a resolution to make Livingston County a Second Amendment sanctuary. On February 18, the county commission voted to pass the resolution. On October 13, 2020, during the COVID-19 pandemic, Bezotte voiced support for the removal of the county mask mandate. Ultimately, the resolution was voted against by the commission. On December 14, 2020, Bezotte voted for an ultimately successful resolution to increase the salaries of Livingston County commissioners.

On January 7, 2019, Bezotte announced his intention to run for the Michigan House of Representatives seat representing the 47th district. The district was an open seat due to State Representative Henry Vaupel being term limited. Bezotte's candidacy was endorsed by Vaupel, as well as Right to Life, former State Representative Cindy Denby, and former Michigan Attorney General Bill Schuette. On August 4, 2020, Bezotte won a four-way primary for the state house seat. In the general election, Bezotte faced Democratic nominee Adam Smiddy, a former Green Beret, Iraq and Afghanistan veteran who previously served as the head of the Veterans' Services Committee. Bezotte defeated Smiddy on November 3, 2020.

In November 2020, House Speaker-elect Jason Wentworth assigned Bezotte to the Policy Action Plan Committee. On March 18, 2021, Bezotte voted for a bill which seeks to allow bars to stay open for two hours longer, in an attempt to help local bars recover financially from the COVID-19 pandemic. On April 2, 2021, Governor Gretchen Whitmer signed Executive Order No. 2021-04, which established the Task Force on Forensic Science. Speaker Wentworth selected Bezotte to serve on the task force.

In the 2022 Michigan House of Representatives election, he was elected in District 50 due to redistricting.

In the August primary preceding the 2024 election, Bezotte was defeated in his bid for re-election by Jason Woolford.

== Personal life ==
Bezotte resides in Howell, Michigan. Bezotte, and his wife, Sheila, filed for divorce in 2023. In their divorce filing, Sheila claimed to have "suffered mental, emotional, and physical abuse" throughout the marriage. Bezotte has denied the allegations.
