= Michigan's 27th House of Representatives district =

American legislative district

Michigan's 27th State House of Representatives district
Representative
Rylee Linting; R–Grosse Ile Township
- Demographics: 83.6% White; 3.5% Black; 7% Hispanic; 1% Asian; 0.1% Native American; 0.5% Other; 4.4% Multiracial
- Population (2024): 88,519

Michigan's 27th House of Representatives district is a legislative district within the Michigan House of Representatives located in Wayne County. The district was created in 1965, when the Michigan Supreme Court ordered the reapportionment of state legislative districts from a county-based system to a proportional one following the Supreme Court case Reynolds v. Sims. It is currently represented by Republican Rylee Linting of Grosse Ile Township.

== List of representatives ==
Representative	Party	Years	Residence	Notes
William R. Copeland	Democratic	1965–1974	Wyandotte	Reapportioned from the former Wayne County, 18th district.
Jeffrey D. Padden	Democratic	1975–1982	Wyandotte	Redistricted to the 30th district.
Vincent "Joe" Porreca	Democratic	1983–1992	Trenton	Redistricted to the 23rd district.
Nick Ciaramitaro	Democratic	1993–1998	Roseville	Redistricted from the 73rd district; term limited.
Michael N. Switalski	Democratic	1999–2002	Roseville	
Andrew E. Meisner	Democratic	2003–2008	Ferndale	Term limited.
Ellen Lipton	Democratic	2009–2014	Huntington Woods	Term limited.
Robert Wittenberg	Democratic	2015–2020	Oak Park (until around 2018); Huntington Woods	Term limited.
Regina Weiss	Democratic	2021–2022	Oak Park	Redistricted to the 6th district.
Jaime Churches	Democratic	2023–2025	Wyandotte	
Rylee Linting	Republican	2025–present	Grosse Ile Township	
Jaime Churches	Democratic	(Note: Member-elect.)	Wyandotte	

== Historical district boundaries ==
Map	Description	Apportionment Plan	Notes
	Wayne County (part): Ecorse (part); Lincoln Park (part); Wyandotte (part)	1964 Apportionment Plan	
	Wayne County (part): Grosse Ile Township; Riverview; Trenton (part); Wyandotte (part)	1972 Apportionment Plan	
	Wayne County (part): Brownstown Township; Flat Rock; Gibraltar; Grosse Ile Township; Riverview; Rockwood; Trenton; Woodhaven	1982 Apportionment Plan	
	Macomb County (part): East Detroit; Roseville; St. Clair Shores (part)	1992 Apportionment Plan	
	Oakland County (part): Berkley; Ferndale; Hazel Park; Huntington Woods; Oak Park (part); Pleasant Ridge	2001 Apportionment Plan	
	Oakland County (part): Berkley; Ferndale; Hazel Park; Huntington Woods; Oak Park; Pleasant Ridge; Royal Oak Township	2011 Apportionment Plan	
	Wayne County (part): Gibraltar; Grosse Ile Township; Riverview; Southgate (part); Trenton; Wyandotte	2021 Apportionment Plan	

== Recent elections ==
=== 2020s ===
2026 Michigan House of Representatives election
Party	Candidate	Votes	%
Democratic	Jaime Churches	23,113	51.84
Republican	Rylee Linting (incumbent)	21,472	48.16
Total votes		44,585	100
Democratic gain from Republican			

2024 Michigan House of Representatives election
Party	Candidate	Votes	%
Republican	Rylee Linting	27,785	52.16
Democratic	Jaime Churches (incumbent)	25,480	47.84
Total votes		53,265	100
Republican gain from Democratic			

2022 Michigan House of Representatives election
Party	Candidate	Votes	%
Democratic	Jaime Churches	21,384	50.78
Republican	Bob Howey	20,724	49.22
Total votes		42,108	100
Democratic hold			

2020 Michigan House of Representatives election
Party	Candidate	Votes	%
Democratic	Regina Weiss	41,791	74.41
Republican	Elizabeth Goss	12,574	22.39
Libertarian	Gregory Scott Stempfle	913	1.63
Green	Sherry A. Wells	886	1.58
Total votes		56,164	100
Democratic hold			

=== 2010s ===
2018 Michigan House of Representatives election
Party	Candidate	Votes	%
Democratic	Robert Wittenberg (incumbent)	35,054	78.5
Republican	Janet Flessland	8,270	18.52
Libertarian	Benjamin Carr	1,328	2.97
Total votes		44,652	100
Democratic hold			

2016 Michigan House of Representatives election
Party	Candidate	Votes	%
Democratic	Robert Wittenberg (incumbent)	36,392	76.78
Republican	Kyle Forrest	11,007	23.22
Total votes		47,399	100
Democratic hold			

2014 Michigan House of Representatives election
Party	Candidate	Votes	%
Democratic	Robert Wittenberg	23,756	75.59
Republican	Michael Ryan	7,671	24.41
Total votes		31,427	100
Democratic hold			

2012 Michigan House of Representatives election
Party	Candidate	Votes	%
Democratic	Ellen Cogen Lipton (incumbent)	34,389	75.61
Republican	Ezra Drissman	9,253	20.34
Libertarian	John Wierzbicki	1,841	4.05
Total votes		45,483	100
Democratic hold			

2010 Michigan House of Representatives election
Party	Candidate	Votes	%
Democratic	Ellen Cogen Lipton (incumbent)	19,245	67.55
Republican	Michelangelo Fortuna III	8,293	29.11
Libertarian	John Skosnik	951	3.34
Total votes		28,489	100
Democratic hold			

=== 2000s ===
2008 Michigan House of Representatives election
Party	Candidate	Votes	%
Democratic	Ellen Cogen Lipton	31,758	71.41
Republican	David Micola	10,099	22.71
Green	Shelly Bane	1,366	3.07
Libertarian	John Skosnik	1,250	2.81
Total votes		44,473	100
Democratic hold			

2006 Michigan House of Representatives election
Party	Candidate	Votes	%
Democratic	Andy Meisner (incumbent)	27,285	78.89
Republican	Will Sears	7,303	21.11
Total votes		34,588	100
Democratic hold			

2004 Michigan House of Representatives election
Party	Candidate	Votes	%
Democratic	Andy Meisner (incumbent)	32,447	73.1
Republican	William Axtell	10,755	24.23
Libertarian	Lloyd W. Sherman	1,188	2.68
Total votes		44,390	100
Democratic hold			

2002 Michigan House of Representatives election
Party	Candidate	Votes	%
Democratic	Andy Meisner	21,037	70.5
Republican	Keith P. Sanford	7,927	26.57
Green	Art Myatt	875	2.93
Total votes		29,839	100
Democratic hold			

2000 Michigan House of Representatives election
Party	Candidate	Votes	%
Democratic	Michael Switalski (incumbent)	24,532	73.27
Republican	Jim Riske	8,012	23.93
Libertarian	David R. Wejrandt	937	2.8
Total votes		33,481	100
Democratic hold			

=== 1990s ===
1998 Michigan House of Representatives election
Party	Candidate	Votes	%
Democratic	Michael Switalski	18,038	70.86
Republican	Philip F. Pitters	6,599	25.92
Libertarian	Thomas R. Sydlow	820	3.22
Total votes		25,457	100
Democratic hold			
