= Lenawee Christian School =

Location
- Adrian, (Lenawee County), Michigan; United States; 41.9067°N 84.0809°W

Information
- Type: Private Christian
- Opened: 1977
- Head of school: Dr Kristy Taylor (Interim)
- Grades: PK-12
- Colors: Blue, White, and Red
- Mascot: Cougar
- Nickname: Cougars
- Website: www.lenawee.org

Lenawee Christian School is a private Christian school located at 111 Wolf Creek Highway in Adrian, Michigan. According to the U.S. Department of Education’s National Center for Education Statistics 2023–2024 Private School Universe Survey (PSS), the school serves 426 students in Kindergarten through 12th Grade and 41 students in Pre-Kindergarten. The current interim Head of School is Dr Kristy Taylor.

== Notable alumni ==
- Kaleb Stewart, musician (1993)
- Rick Baxter, Michigan businessman and politician (1997)
- London Elise Moore, Actress (2011)

== State Championships (MHSAA) ==
- Girls Volleyball: 1996, 2003, 2004
- Boys Soccer: 2020
- Boys Football: 2020, 2021, 2023
