= Clark Bisbee =

American politician

Clark E. Bisbee

Member of the Michigan House of Representatives from the 64th district
- In office January 1, 1999 – December 31, 2004
- Preceded by: Michael J. Griffin
- Succeeded by: Rick Baxter

Personal details
- Born: February 16, 1949 Jackson, Michigan
- Died: March 27, 2023 (aged 74)
- Party: Michigan Republican Party
- Spouse: Katie Miller Bisbee
- Education: Albion College

Clark E. Bisbee was an American politician and businessman from Jackson, Michigan. He was the owner of Bisbee Travel, a local travel agency.

He served as the Republican representative to Michigan's state house from Michigan's 64th district until 2004, until having served the maximum number of terms. Republican Rick Baxter succeeded him for one term.

In 2004 Bisbee ran in the Republican primary for the U.S. House of Representatives, Michigan's 7th congressional district, but received only 14% of the primary vote (fourth place in a six-way race).

== Family ==
Bisbee was married to his wife Katie Miller Bisbee and together they had four children.

== Education ==
Bisbee received his BA in Business from Albion College.

== Professional experience ==
- Bisbee was the owner of Bisbee Travel Inc.
- From 1978 to 1989 he was the founder and operator of Infrared Services
- From 1968 to 1978 he was a teller for Commercial Loan Officer
