= Ellen Lipton =

American politician from Michigan

Member of the Michigan House of Representatives from the 27th district
- In office January 1, 2009 – January 1, 2015
- Preceded by: Andy Meisner
- Succeeded by: Robert Wittenberg

Personal details
- Born: March 26, 1967 (age 59) Philadelphia, Pennsylvania, U.S.
- Party: Democratic
- Spouse: Marc Lipton
- Education: Williams College (BS); Harvard University (JD)

Ellen Cogen Lipton (born March 26, 1967) is an American politician and patent attorney from Huntington Woods, Michigan. She currently serves on the Michigan State Board of Education.

She formerly served as a member of the Michigan State House of Representatives. A Democrat, she represented the 27th State House District, which is located north of Detroit in south-east Oakland County. She was first elected in 2008, and subsequently re-elected in 2010 and 2012. She ran to represent the 11th District in the state Senate in 2014. Incumbent Vincent Gregory defeated Vicki Barnett and Ellen Lipton in the Democratic primary. In 2018, she joined the Democratic field to replace retiring Rep. Sander Levin in the 9th District of Michigan. She was defeated in the primary by Andy Levin, the retiring incumbent's son winning 42.4% to Levin's 52.4. Lipton carried the Oakland County portion of the District, while Levin carried the Macomb County section.

In 2020, Lipton was nominated by the MDP to run for the State Board of Education. She won an 8 year term.

== Biography ==
Ellen Cogen was born to a Jewish family in Philadelphia, Pennsylvania, on March 26, 1967. She graduated from Altamont High School in 1984 and earned a bachelor's degree in chemistry from Williams College in 1988. She received her Juris Doctor from Harvard University in 1992. She was admitted to the State Bar of Michigan (Section of Patent, Trademark, and Copyright Law) and served as a patent attorney specializing in medicine and technology for several years.

She was formerly president of the Michigan Ambassadors for the Weizmann Institute.

== Political career ==
Lipton took office as representative for the 27th District on January 1, 2009, and was subsequently re-elected in November 2010, and November 2012.

The 27th District is a small suburban district located north of the city of Detroit, in south-eastern Oakland County. It includes all of the following cities: Berkley, Ferndale, Hazel Park, Huntington Woods, Oak Park, Pleasant Ridge, and Royal Oak Township. The district is overwhelmingly Democratic and is the most liberal of all Detroit-area districts. It has a median household income of $49,214, above the Michigan average. The 27th district also has a strong Jewish population.

Lipton served on the Education (Democratic vice chair), Statutory Legislative Council (Democratic vice chair), Judiciary, and Insurance Committees. She previously served on the Appropriations Committee.

Lipton's campaigns focused mainly on the economy, and her support for public education, green energy, no-fault auto insurance, embryonic stem-cell research, and protecting Michigan's natural resources. She was endorsed by EMILY's List, an organization that supports pro-choice female candidates, the Michigan Sierra Club, Michigan Clean Water Action, Equality Michigan, the Michigan AFL-CIO, The Detroit News and The Detroit Free Press.

In 2013, Lipton was named Democratic Legislator of the Year by the Michigan Information & Research Service (MIRS), and was named the Sander M. Levin Elected Official of the Year by the Oakland County Democratic Party. She was also named an Environmental Champion by the Michigan Chapter of the Sierra Club and a Clean Water Hero by the Michigan Chapter of Clean Water Action for her voting on environmental issues.

In 2014, Lipton ran to become Michigan's next state senator for the 11th District, which includes the cities of Farmington, Farmington Hills, Ferndale, Hazel Park, Huntington Woods, Lathrup Village, Madison Heights, Oak Park, Pleasant Ridge, Southfield, and Royal Oak Township. Lipton was defeated by incumbent Senator Vincent Gregory.

In 2020, Lipton ran for and won a seat on the Michigan State Board of Education, receiving more votes than any other candidate running for a Statewide education office.

== Electoral history ==
- 2020 campaign for Michigan State Board of Education
- (Need data)
- 2018 campaign for US House of Representatives, Democratic Primary
  - Andy Levin (D), 52.4%
  - Ellen Cogen Lipton (D), 42.4%
  - Martin Brook (D), 5.1%
- 2014 campaign for State Senate, Democratic Primary
  - Vincent Gregory (D), 34.7%
  - Vicki Barnett (D), 34.3%
  - Ellen Cogen Lipton (D), 31%
- 2012 campaign for State House
  - Ellen Cogen Lipton (D), 75.6%
  - Ezra Drissman (R), 20.3%
  - John Wierzbicki (L), 4%
- 2010 campaign for State House
  - Ellen Cogen Lipton (D), 67.55%
  - Michelangelo Fortuna III (R), 29.11%
  - John Skosnik (L), 3.34%
- 2008 campaign for State House
  - Ellen Cogen Lipton (D), 71.41%
  - David Micola (R), 22.71%
  - Shelly Bane (G), 3.07%
  - John Skosnik (L), 2.81%
