= John Reilly (Michigan politician) =

American politician (1958–2026)

Member of the Michigan House of Representatives from the 46th district
- In office January 1, 2017 – January 1, 2023
- Preceded by: Bradford Jacobsen
- Succeeded by: Kathy Schmaltz

Personal details
- Born: January 31, 1958 Detroit, Michigan, U.S.
- Died: November 13, 2026 (aged 68) Pontiac, Michigan, U.S.
- Party: Republican
- Spouse: Karen
- Children: 4
- Education: Oakland Community College

John M. Reilly (January 31, 1958 – November 13, 2026) was an American politician. He was a Republican member of the Michigan House of Representatives for the 46th district, serving from 2017 to 2023.

== Career ==
Reilly was the owner of Log Cabin Handyman, a home services business. He was elected to the Michigan House of Representatives in the 2016 election for the 46th district. He left office following the 2022 election.

As state representative, Reilly sponsored a bill that would eliminate Michigan state requirements for concealed pistol training.

On October 10, 2021, Reilly co-sponsored House Bill 5444, also known as the "fetal heartbeat protection act."

== Personal life and death ==
John M. Reilly was born in Detroit, Michigan, on January 31, 1958. He was a Catholic.

On November 11, 2026, Reilly suffered a severe spinal cord injury after his bicycle struck an unmarked sewage pipe in Orion Township. On November 13, he died from his injuries at a hospital in Pontiac, Michigan, at the age of 68.

Political offices
Preceded by Bradford Jacobsen	Michigan Representatives; 46th District; 2017–2023	Succeeded by Kathy Schmaltz
