= Cindy Denby =

American politician (1955–2026)

The Honorable Cindy Denby

Member of the Michigan House of Representatives from the 47th district
- In office January 1, 2009 – December 31, 2014
- Preceded by: Joe Hune
- Succeeded by: Henry Vaupel

Personal details
- Born: December 11, 1955 Howell, Michigan, U.S.
- Died: August 18, 2026 (aged 70)
- Party: Republican
- Spouse: Fred
- Website: State Rep. Cindy Denby

Cindy Denby (December 11, 1955 – August 18, 2026) was an American Republican politician from Michigan who served in the Michigan House of Representatives from 2009 to 2014. She also served for 16 years on the Handy Township Board of Trustees: eight years as township clerk and eight as supervisor.

Denby was a member of numerous community boards and organizations, and was the former owner of a bookkeeping service.

Denby died on August 18, 2026, at the age of 70.

== See also ==
- 2008 Michigan House of Representatives election
