= Regina Weiss =

American politician (born 1986)

Member of the Michigan House of Representatives
- Incumbent
- Assumed office January 1, 2021
- Preceded by: Robert Wittenberg
- Succeeded by: Candace Calloway (elect)
- Constituency: 27th district (2021–2022); 6th district (2023–2024); 5th district (2025–present)

Personal details
- Born: c. 1986 (age 39–40) Chicago, Illinois, U.S.
- Party: Democratic
- Spouse: Laren Weiss
- Children: 2
- Education: Valparaiso University
- Website: House website Campaign website

Regina Hollingshead Weiss (born July 7, 1986) is an American educator and politician serving as a member of the Michigan House of Representatives since 2021, currently representing the 5th district. She is a member of the Democratic Party.

== Early life and education ==
Weiss was born on July 7, 1986, in Chicago, Illinois. In 2009, Weiss earned a bachelor's degree in history and secondary education from Valparaiso University in Indiana.

== Early career ==
Weiss has worked as a high school English and social studies teacher in the Detroit Public Schools Community District, where she was a member of the American Federation of Teachers, DFT Local 231. Weiss served as a member of the Oak Park City Council from 2017-2020.

== State legislature ==
On November 3, 2020, Weiss was elected to the Michigan House of Representatives seat representing the 27th district. She assumed office on January 1, 2021. Weiss resigned her position as city council member to serve as a state representative.

On November 8, 2022, Weiss was elected with over 83% of the vote to represent the 6th state House district, which had changed with redistricting. Following court-mandated redistricting of the Detroit area, Weiss ran in the 5th district for the 2024 election, winning reelection.

== Personal life ==
Weiss is married to Laren Weiss. Weiss is a Unitarian Universalist.
