= Jim Marleau =

American politician

Member of the Michigan Senate from the 12th district
- In office January 1, 2011 – January 9, 2019
- Preceded by: Mike Bishop
- Succeeded by: Rosemary Bayer

Member of the Michigan House of Representatives from the 46th district
- In office January 1, 2005 – December 31, 2010
- Preceded by: Ruth Johnson
- Succeeded by: Bradford Jacobsen

Personal details
- Born: March 18, 1947 (age 79) Lake Orion, Michigan
- Spouse: Thea Marleau
- Children: 2

Jim Marleau (born 1947) is an American politician from Michigan. A Republican, Marleau represented the 12th district of the Michigan Senate from 2011 until 2019.

== Early life ==
March 18, 1947, Marleau was born in Lake Orion, Michigan.

== Education ==
Marleau earned an AAS degree in Business/Finance from University of Toledo. Marleau earned a CFMA in Municipal Finance Administration from Central Michigan University.

== Career ==
Marleau was for many years a businessman. Marleau served as a treasurer in Orion Township, Michigan.

On November 2, 2004, Marleau won the election and became a Republican member of Michigan House of Representatives for District 46. Marleau defeated Daniel Myslakowski with 63.08% of the votes. On November 7, 2006, as an incumbent, Marleau won the election and continued serving District 46. Marleau defeated Bill Pearson with 60.97% of the votes. On November 4, 2008, as an incumbent, Marleau won the election and continued serving District 46. Marleau defeated Katherine Houston 60.57% of the votes.

On November 2, 2010, Marleau won election and became a state senator of Michigan Senate for District 12. Marleau defeated Casandra E. Ulbrich with 60.90% of the votes. On November 4, 2014, as an incumbent, Marleau won the election and continued serving as a state senator for District 12. Marleau defeated Paul Secrest.

== Personal life ==
Marleau's wife is Thea Marleau. They have two children.
