= Joseph G. Pavlov =

American politician

Member of the Michigan House of Representatives from the 64th district
- Incumbent
- Assumed office January 1, 2025
- Preceded by: Andrew Beeler

Personal details
- Born: Michigan, U.S.
- Party: Republican

Joseph G. Pavlov is an American retired educator and politician serving as a member of the Michigan House of Representatives since January 2025, representing the 64th district. He is a member of the Republican Party.

== Biography ==
He is a retired high school teacher from Kimball Township and is a member of the organizations Right to life of St. Clair County and the Knights of Columbus. in 2024 he ran for the 64th district of the Michigan House of Representatives and won the Republican Primary against St. Clair County Commissioner Jorja Baldwin, Former state representative Gary Eisen and two political newcomers Ryan Maxon and Dan Geiersbach. he would then beat Democratic challenger John Anter by 61% to 39%.
