= Pulaski Township, Michigan =

- Civil township
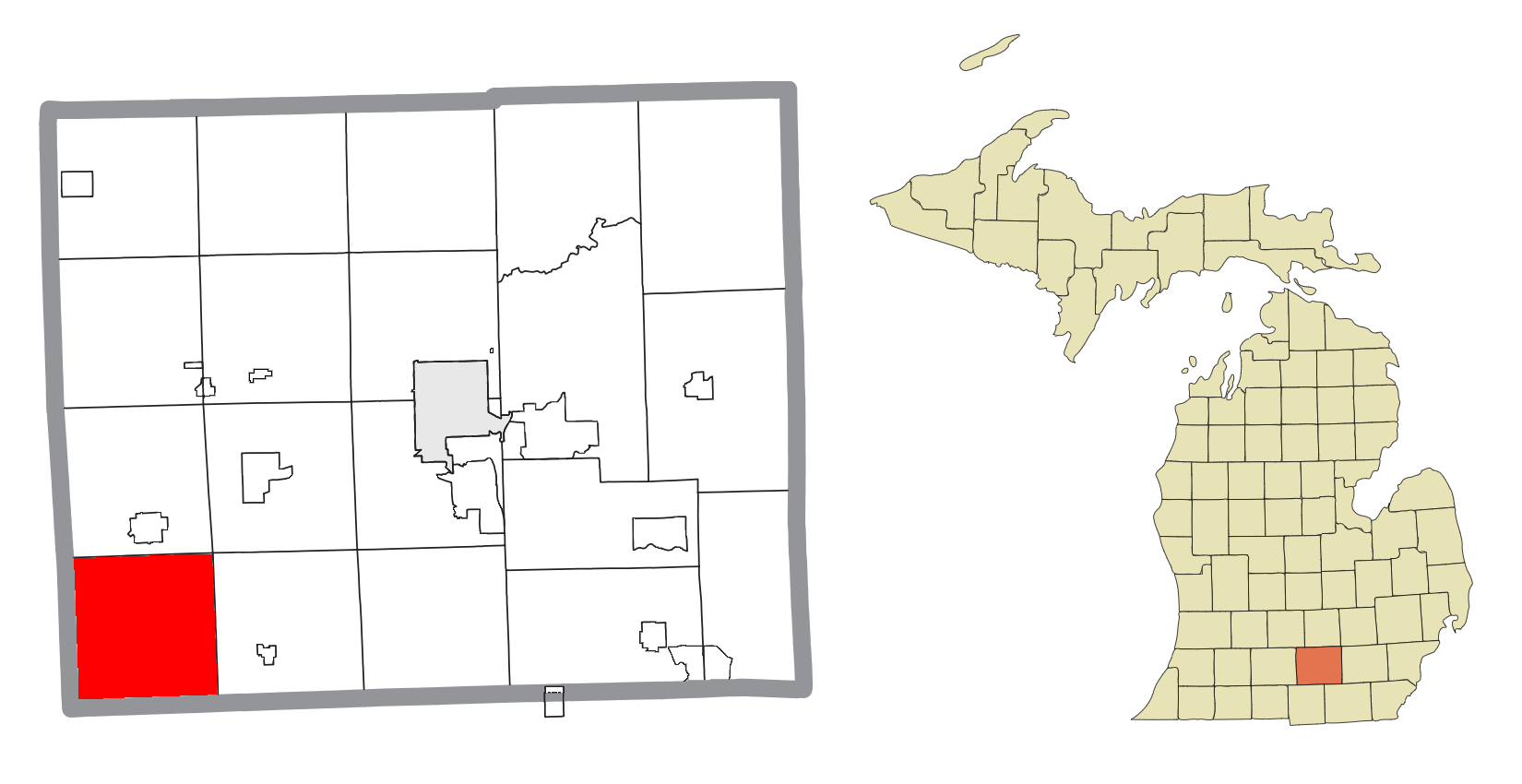
- Location within Jackson County

- Location within the state of Michigan Pulaski Township (the United States)
- Coordinates: 42°06′26″N 84°39′24″W
- Country: United States
- State: Michigan
- County: Jackson
- Established: 1837

Government
  - Supervisor: Robert Jones
  - Clerk: Kris Runyon

Area
  - Total: 36.68 sq mi (95.0 km^{2})
  - Land: 36.18 sq mi (93.7 km^{2})
  - Water: 0.50 sq mi (1.3 km^{2})
- Elevation: 1,080 ft (330 m)

Population (2020)
  - Total: 1,883
  - Density: 52.05/sq mi (20.09/km^{2})
- Time zone: UTC-5 (Eastern (EST))
  - Summer (DST): UTC-4 (EDT)
- ZIP code(s): 49237 (Concord); 49241 (Hanover); 49250 (Jonesville); 49252 (Litchfield)
- Area code: 517
- FIPS code: 26-66440
- GNIS feature ID: 1626944
- Website: Official website

Pulaski Township (/pəˈlæs.kɐɪ/ /ˈtɐʊn.t̚ʃɪp̚/) is a civil township of Jackson County in the southern portion of the U.S. state of Michigan. As of the 2020 census, the township population was 1,883.

== Geography ==
According to the United States Census Bureau, the township has a total area of 36.68 square miles (95.00 km^{2}), of which 36.18 square miles (93.71 km^{2}) is land and 0.50 square miles (1.29 km^{2}) (1.36%) is water.

Pulaski Township is in the southwest corner of Jackson County. It is bordered to the west by Calhoun County and to the south by Hillsdale County. The township is drained by the North and South branches of the Kalamazoo River. The South Branch runs through the southwestern part of the township and the southeast corner, while the North Branch flows to the north of the township. The township comprising the entire portion of the survey township of T4S R3W.

- Wheelerton Station was a train station located in the Pulaski hamlet.

== Demographics ==
As of the census of 2000, there were 1,931 people, 700 households, and 546 families residing in the township. The population density was 53.3 inhabitants per square mile (20.6/km^{2}). There were 769 housing units at an average density of 21.2 per square mile (8.2/km^{2}). The racial makeup of the township was 98.29% White, 0.16% African American, 0.36% Native American, 0.41% from other races, and 0.78% from two or more races. Hispanic or Latino of any race were 0.62% of the population.

There were 700 households, out of which 35.4% had children under the age of 18 living with them, 65.4% were married couples living together, 6.6% had a female householder with no husband present, and 21.9% were non-families. 17.9% of all households were made up of individuals, and 6.0% had someone living alone who was 65 years of age or older. The average household size was 2.75 and the average family size was 3.08.

In the township the population was spread out, with 28.0% under the age of 18, 7.3% from 18 to 24, 28.1% from 25 to 44, 25.8% from 45 to 64, and 10.8% who were 65 years of age or older. The median age was 37 years. For every 100 females, there were 104.8 males. For every 100 females age 18 and over, there were 103.7 males.

The median income for a household in the township was $44,306, and the median income for a family was $50,769. Males had a median income of $37,216 versus $28,661 for females. The per capita income for the township was $18,126. About 5.3% of families and 6.2% of the population were below the poverty line, including 7.3% of those under age 18 and 4.1% of those age 65 or over.
