= Michigan's 33rd House of Representatives district =

American legislative district

Michigan's 33rd State House of Representatives district
Representative
Morgan Foreman; D–Ann Arbor
- Demographics: 68.4% White; 8.2% Black; 5.9% Hispanic; 11.8% Asian; 0.1% Native American; 0.5% Other; 5.2% Multiracial
- Population (2024): 94,958

Michigan's 33rd House of Representatives district is a legislative district within the Michigan House of Representatives located in Washtenaw County. The district was created in 1965, when the Michigan Supreme Court ordered the reapportionment of state legislative districts from a county-based system to a proportional one following the Supreme Court case Reynolds v. Sims. It is currently represented by Democrat Morgan Foreman of Ann Arbor.

== List of representatives ==
Representative	Party	Years	Residence	Notes
Richard Arthur Young	Democratic	1965–1972	Dearborn Heights	Redistricted to the 32nd district.
William R. Keith	Democratic	1973–1992	Garden City	Redistricted to the 17th district.
Alvin H. Kukuk	Republican	1993–1998	Macomb Township	Term limited.
Janet L. Kukuk	Republican	1999–2000	Macomb Township	Died November 2000; was re-elected for another term 12 days prior.
Leon C. Drolet	Republican	2001 (Note: Elected in a 2001 special election to replace Rep. Janet L. Kukuk, who died.)–2006	Clinton Township	Term limited.
Kimberly Meltzer	Republican	2007–2010	Clinton Township	
Ken Goike	Republican	2011–2016	Ray Township	Term limited.
Jeffrey Yaroch	Republican	2017–2022	Richmond	Term limited.
Felicia Brabec	Democratic	2023–2024	Ann Arbor	Redistricted from the 55th district.
Morgan Foreman	Democratic	2025–present	Ann Arbor	

== Historical district boundaries ==
Map	Description	Apportionment Plan	Notes
	Wayne County (part): Nankin Township (part); Dearborn (part); Dearborn Heights (part); Livonia (part)	1964 Apportionment Plan (Note: Referred to as the Austin-Kleiner plan.)	
	Wayne County (part): Dearborn Heights (part); Garden City; Inkster	1972 Apportionment Plan (Note: Referred to as the Hatcher-Kleiner plan.)	
	Wayne County (part): Garden City; Inkster; Westland (part)	1982 Apportionment Plan	
	Macomb County (part): Chesterfield Township; Clinton Township (part); Lenox Township; Macomb Township; New Baltimore	1992 Apportionment Plan	
	Macomb County (part): Clinton Township (part); Macomb Township; Ray Township	2001 Apportionment Plan	
	Macomb County (part): Armada Township; Lenox Township; Macomb Township (part); Memphis (part); Ray Township; Richmond (part); Richmond Township	2011 Apportionment Plan	
	Washtenaw County (part): Ann Arbor (part); Bridgewater Township; Freedom Township (part); Lodi Township; Pittsfield Charter Township (part); Saline; Saline Township; Scio Township (part); York Township (part)	2021 Apportionment Plan (Note: Referred to as the Hickory plan.)	

== Recent elections ==
=== 2020s ===
2026 Michigan House of Representatives election
Party	Candidate	Votes	%
Democratic	Morgan Foreman (incumbent)	40,423	78.61
Republican	Catherine Rogers	10,998	21.39
Total votes		51,421	100
Democratic hold			

2024 Michigan House of Representatives election
Party	Candidate	Votes	%
Democratic	Morgan Foreman	41,511	74.22
Republican	Jason Rogers	14,421	25.78
Total votes		55,932	100
Democratic hold			

2022 Michigan House of Representatives election
Party	Candidate	Votes	%
Democratic	Felicia Brabec	35,761	75.49
Republican	Robert Borer III	11,612	24.51
Total votes		47,373	100
Democratic gain from Republican			

2020 Michigan House of Representatives election
Party	Candidate	Votes	%
Republican	Jeff Yaroch (incumbent)	39,429	70.45
Democratic	Olu Jabari	16,538	29.55
Total votes		55,967	100
Republican hold			

=== 2010s ===
2018 Michigan House of Representatives election
Party	Candidate	Votes	%
Republican	Jeff Yaroch (incumbent)	25,929	65.16
Democratic	Andrea Geralds	13,865	34.84
Total votes		39,794	100
Republican hold			

2016 Michigan House of Representatives election
Party	Candidate	Votes	%
Republican	Jeff Yaroch	30,295	69.99
Democratic	Yani Warda	12,987	30.01
Total votes		43,282	100
Republican hold			

2014 Michigan House of Representatives election
Party	Candidate	Votes	%
Republican	Ken Goike (incumbent)	18,148	65.88
Democratic	Joe Ruffin	9,398	34.12
Total votes		27,546	100
Republican hold			

2012 Michigan House of Representatives election
Party	Candidate	Votes	%
Republican	Ken Goike (incumbent)	24,163	61.91
Democratic	Marth O'Kray	14,869	38.09
Total votes		39,032	100
Republican hold			

2010 Michigan House of Representatives election
Party	Candidate	Votes	%
Republican	Ken Goike	24,469	66.48
Democratic	Andrew Prasiloski	12,339	33.52
Total votes		36,808	100
Republican hold			

=== 2000s ===
2008 Michigan House of Representatives election
Party	Candidate	Votes	%
Republican	Kim Meltzer (incumbent)	32,923	59.12
Democratic	Andrew Prasiloski	22,765	40.88
Total votes		55,688	100
Republican hold			

2006 Michigan House of Representatives election
Party	Candidate	Votes	%
Republican	Kim Meltzer	21,753	53.59
Democratic	Gary E. Cynowa	18,838	46.41
Total votes		40,591	100
Republican hold			

2004 Michigan House of Representatives election
Party	Candidate	Votes	%
Republican	Leon Drolet (incumbent)	30,292	60.66
Democratic	Gary E. Cynowa	19,644	39.34
Total votes		49,936	100
Republican hold			

2002 Michigan House of Representatives election
Party	Candidate	Votes	%
Republican	Leon Drolet (incumbent)	17,856	60.17
Democratic	Anthony Ventimiglia	11,822	39.83
Total votes		29,678	100
Republican hold			

2001 Michigan House of Representatives 33rd district special election
Party	Candidate	Votes	%
Republican	Leon Drolet	4,860	59.21
Democratic	Richard Onaga	3,348	40.79
Total votes		8,208	100
Republican hold			

2000 Michigan House of Representatives election
Party	Candidate	Votes	%
Republican	Janet Kukuk (Note: Rep. Kukuk died 12 days after the election was held.) (incumbent)	32,622	57.94
Democratic	Bernadette DiSano	21,090	37.46
Libertarian	Joseph L. Zemens	1,334	2.37
U.S. Taxpayers'	Tom Watson	1,259	2.24
Total votes		56,305	100
Republican hold			

=== 1990s ===
1998 Michigan House of Representatives election
Party	Candidate	Votes	%
Republican	Janet Kukuk	20,526	57.3
Democratic	Charles Locklear	14,473	40.4
Libertarian	Joseph L. Zemens	824	2.3
Total votes		35,823	100
Republican hold			
