= Kukuk =

Kukuk is a surname. Notable people with the surname include:

- Alvin H. Kukuk (1937–2017), American politician
- Christian Kukuk (born 1990), German equestrian
- Cody Kukuk (born 1993), American baseball pitcher
- Janet Kukuk (1942–2000), American politician
