= Morgan Foreman =

American politician

Member of the Michigan House of Representatives from the 33rd district
- Incumbent
- Assumed office January 1, 2025
- Preceded by: Felicia Brabec

Personal details
- Born: 1989 or 1990 (age 35–36)
- Party: Democratic

Morgan Foreman (born 1989 or 1990 (age 35–36)) is an American politician serving as a member of the Michigan House of Representatives since January 2025, representing the 33rd district. She is a member of the Democratic Party.

== Political career ==
Foreman served as the constituent services director for Felicia Brabec following Brabec's election to the Michigan House of Representatives in the 2020 Michigan House of Representatives election.

In 2024, Brabec chose not to stand for reelection, deciding to focus on running for State Senate in 2026. Foreman ran to succeed Brabec in the 33rd district. She faced Democrat Rima Mohammad in the primary election. Foreman planned to build on Brabec's work in the legislature, highlighting her experience in Brabec's office. She defeated Mohammad in the Democratic primary with 67% of the vote. She faced Republican Jason Rogers in the general election. She defeated Rogers with 75% of the vote.

== Personal life ==
Foreman is a resident of Pittsfield Township, Michigan.

== Electoral history ==
2024 Michigan's 33rd House of Representatives district Democratic primary election
Party	Candidate	Votes	%
Democratic	Morgan Foreman	11,271	66.88%
Democratic	Rima Mohammad	5,581	33.12%
Total votes		16,852	100.0

2024 Michigan's 33rd House of Representatives district election
Party	Candidate	Votes	%
Democratic	Morgan Foreman	41,511	74.22%
Republican	Jason Rogers	14,421	25.78%
Total votes		55,932	100.0
