= Malletts Creek =

River in the United States of America

Coordinates: 42°15′55.2″N 83°41′9.8″W

Malletts Creek flowing through a small reservoir constructed to manage stormwater pollution on Ann Arbor's south side

Malletts Creek is a stream in Washtenaw County, Michigan. A tributary to the Huron River, much of Malletts Creek's watershed lies within urban or suburban areas. Approximately 40% of the land within the creek's watershed is topped with impermeable surfaces. As a result, the stream exists in an extremely impaired state, and testing sites on the stream monitored through the "Adopt-A-Stream" program continuously indicate the streams poor quality.

== Watershed ==
Malletts Creek is located primarily in the city of Ann Arbor, though its 11 square-mile watershed also includes northern Pittsfield Township, and very small portions of the townships of Ann Arbor, Superior, Lodi and Scio. Malletts Creek flows into South Pond, a side channel of the Huron River.

== Restoration ==
Washtenaw County is implementing restoration plans in partnership with Ann Arbor, Pittsfield Township, Huron River Watershed Council, and other groups to improve the water quality of Malletts Creek. Works completed as of May 2014 include stabilization of the stream's banks and creation of native prairie land and riparian wetland habitats on various parts of the main channel, as well as a tributary flowing through County Farm Park.

== Gallery ==
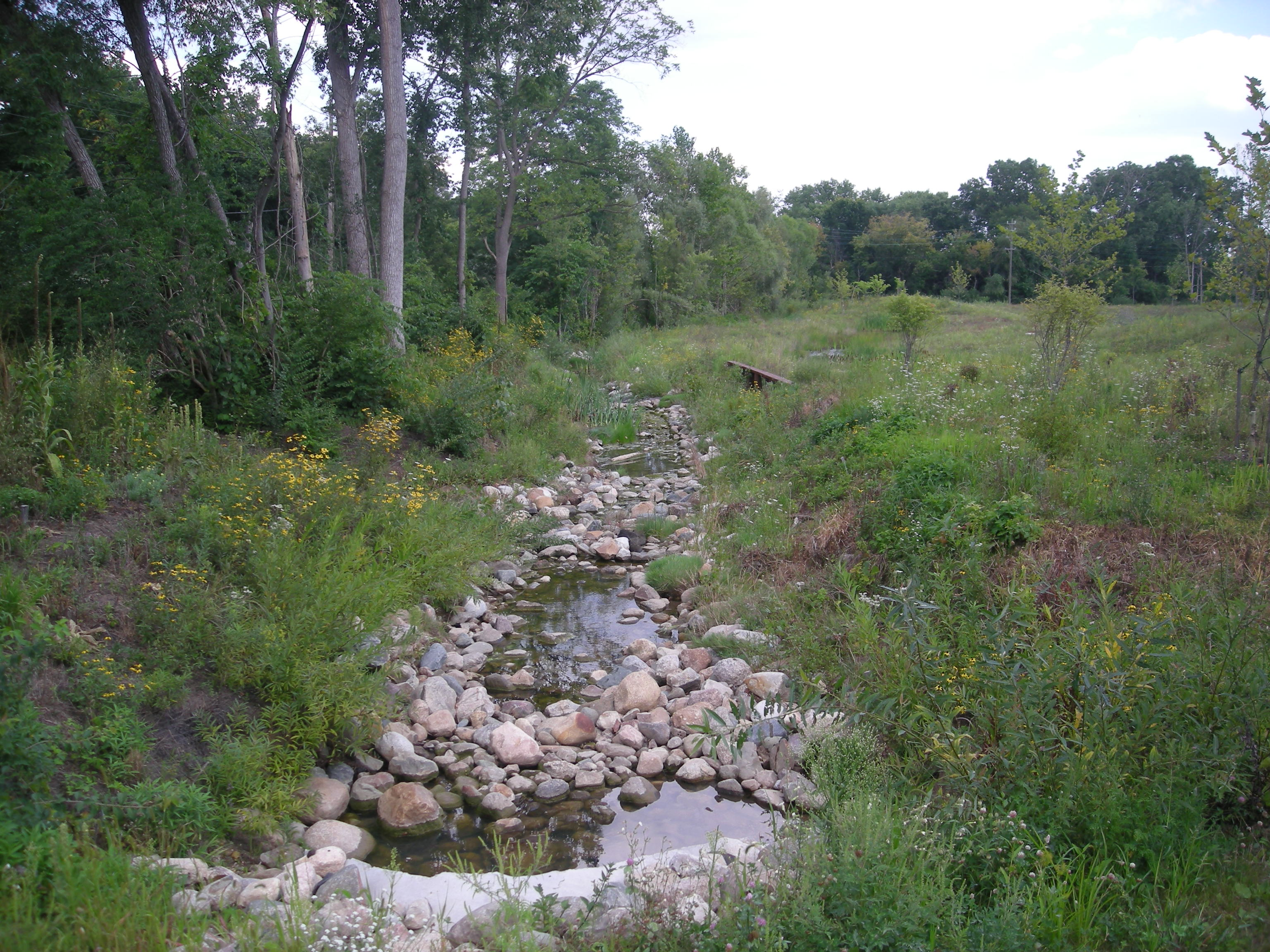
A tributary of Malletts Creek in County Farm Park after restoration (2013)

A polluted section of Malletts Creek in Ann Arbor's Mary Beth Doyle park

A mallard drake swims along Malletts Creek in the woodlands of Mary Beth Doyle park

== See also ==
- County Farm Park
- Huron River
