= Adam Zemke =

American politician

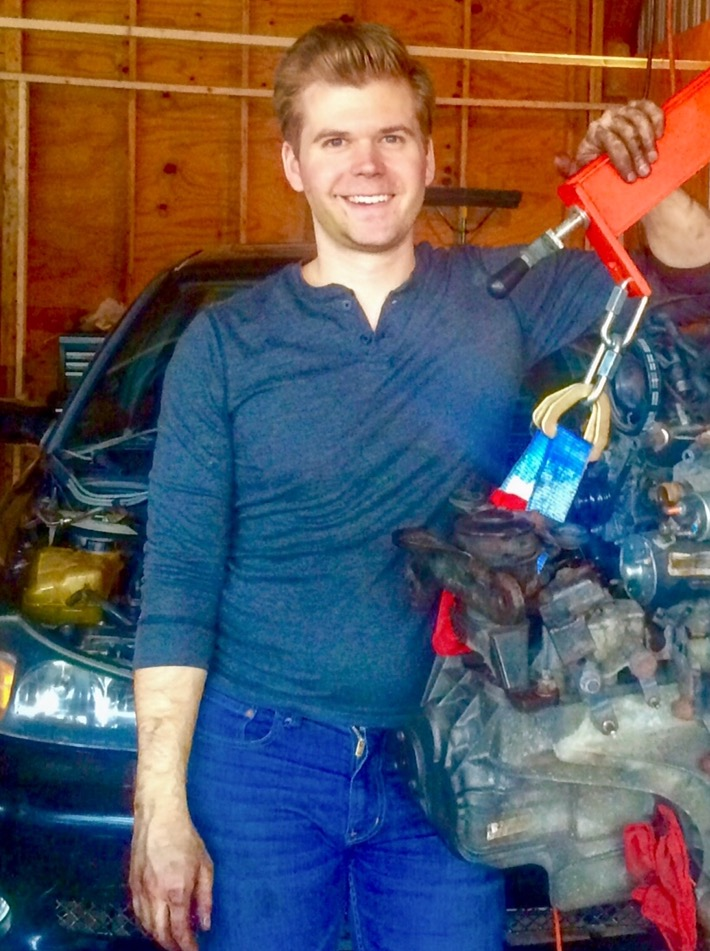

Member of the Michigan House of Representatives from the 55th district
- In office January 1, 2013 – January 1, 2019
- Preceded by: Rick Olson
- Succeeded by: Rebekah Warren

Personal details
- Born: June 4, 1983 (age 43) Ann Arbor, Michigan
- Party: Democratic
- Education: Michigan State University (BS, MS)

Adam Frederick Zemke (born June 4, 1983) is a former member of the Michigan House of Representatives. He represented Michigan's 55th district in Washtenaw County from 2013 to 2018.

== Early life, education and family ==
Zemke was born and raised in Ann Arbor, Michigan. His parents, Debra Lehto and Frederick Zemke, divorced when he was a toddler. He spent much of his childhood in Michigan, attending Haisley Elementary, Forsythe Middle and Pioneer High schools in the Ann Arbor Public Schools district. He also attended Princeton High school in New Jersey while his then-stepfather, Dr. Trevor Wooley, worked at the Institute for Advanced Study in Princeton, NJ. Adam has one brother, Cameron Wooley, and a sister, Michelle Zemke—both younger.

After high school, Zemke enrolled in and attended Michigan State University, studying Mechanical engineering and obtaining undergraduate and master's degrees in this field. In spring 2005, Zemke served as the commencement speaker for his graduating class of the College of Engineering.

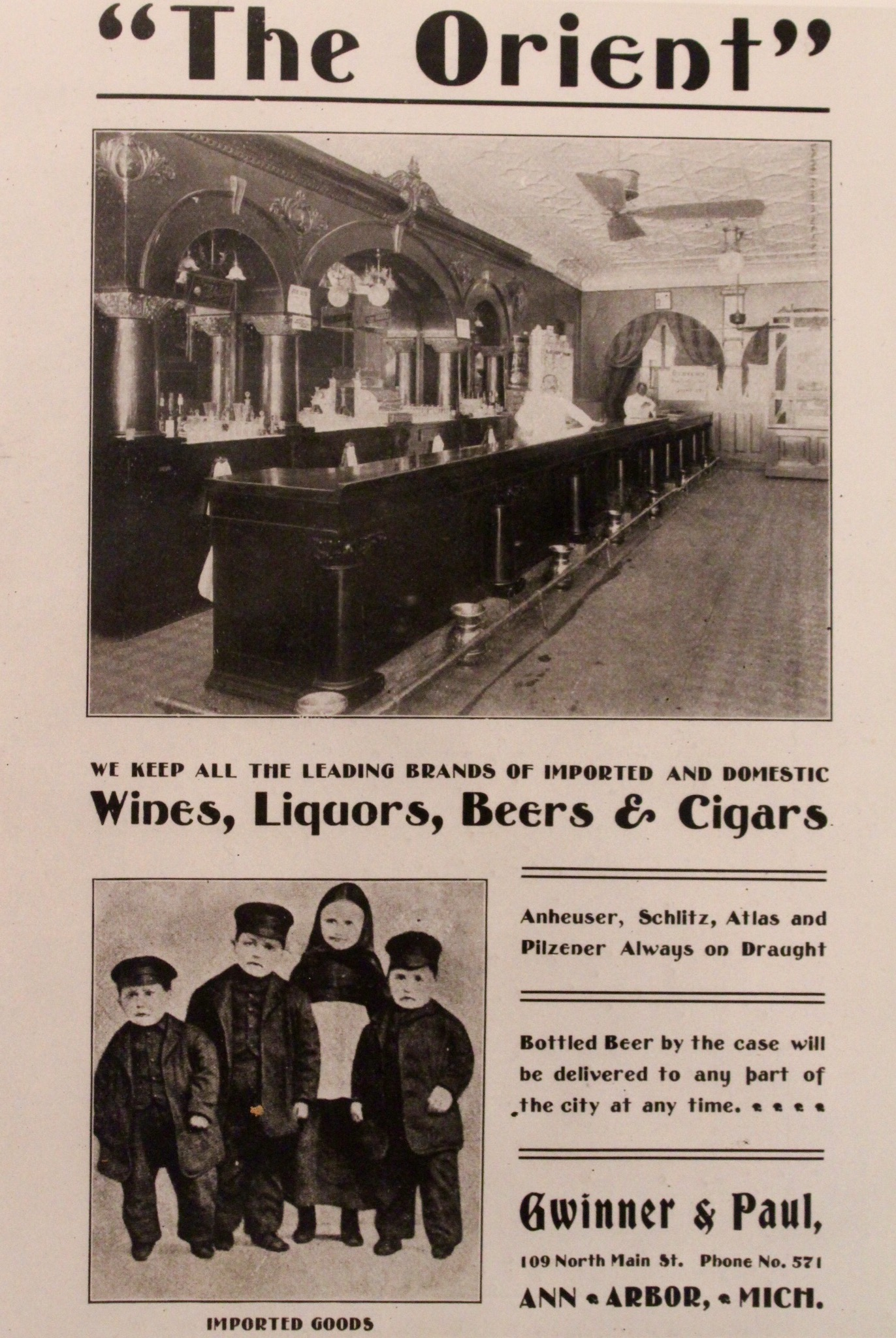

Zemke's family has deep roots in Washtenaw County. His father's family first emigrated to Ann Arbor and settled on Spring street in the early 1890s. They are of German ancestry. While in Ann Arbor, Zemke's great grandfather owned and operated The Orient, a well-known "townie" pool hall and barber shop on the corner of North Main and Ann streets.

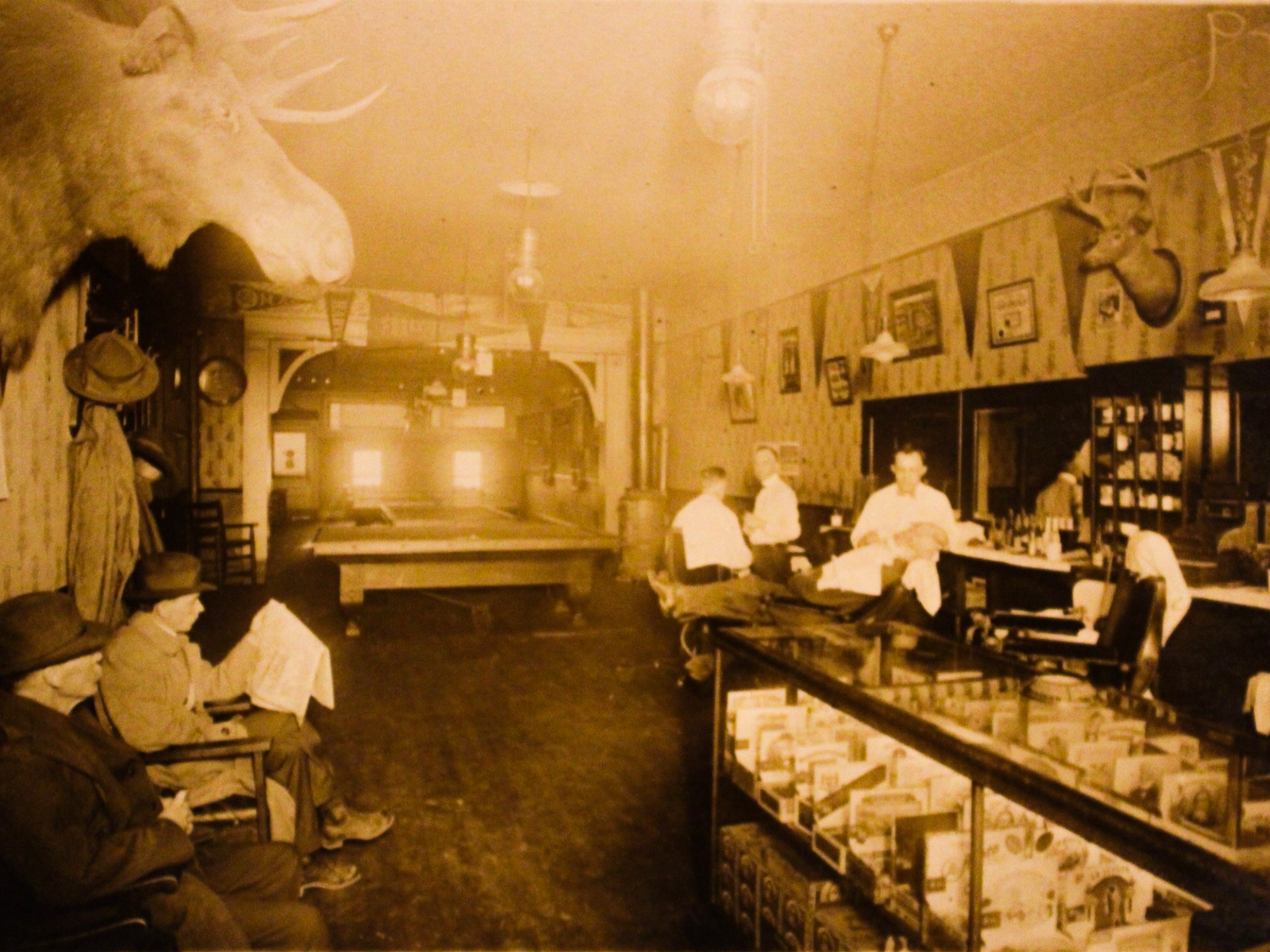
The Orient

In 1935, his grandfather Frederick "Fritz" Zemke left the University of Michigan to start a business out of his parents' Spring Street garage, operating vending machines and jukeboxes in local establishments. This business, called Zemke Operated Machines, is run by Zemke's father and has remained in continuous operation to this day.

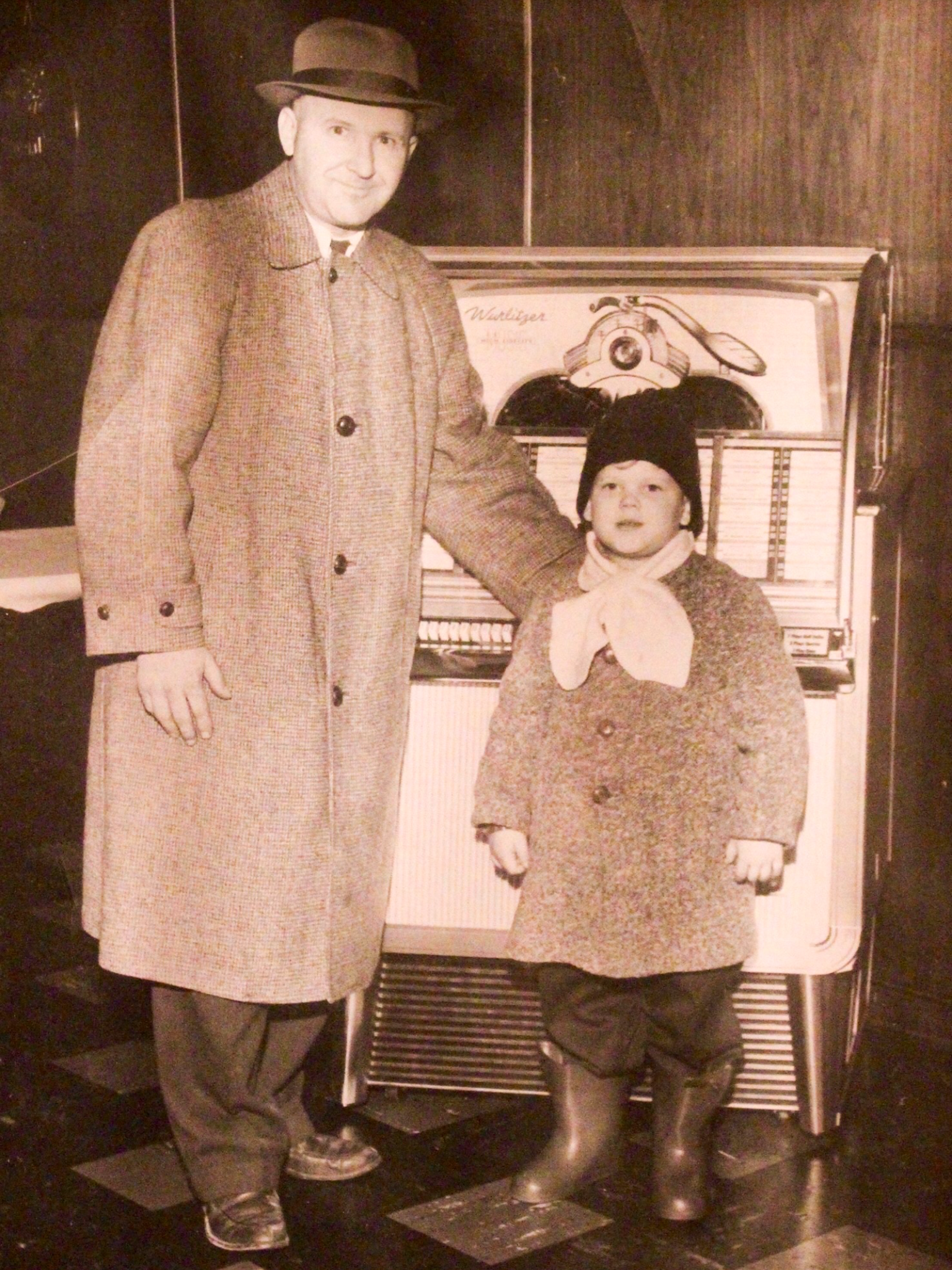
Zemke Operated Machines

=== Formula SAE ===
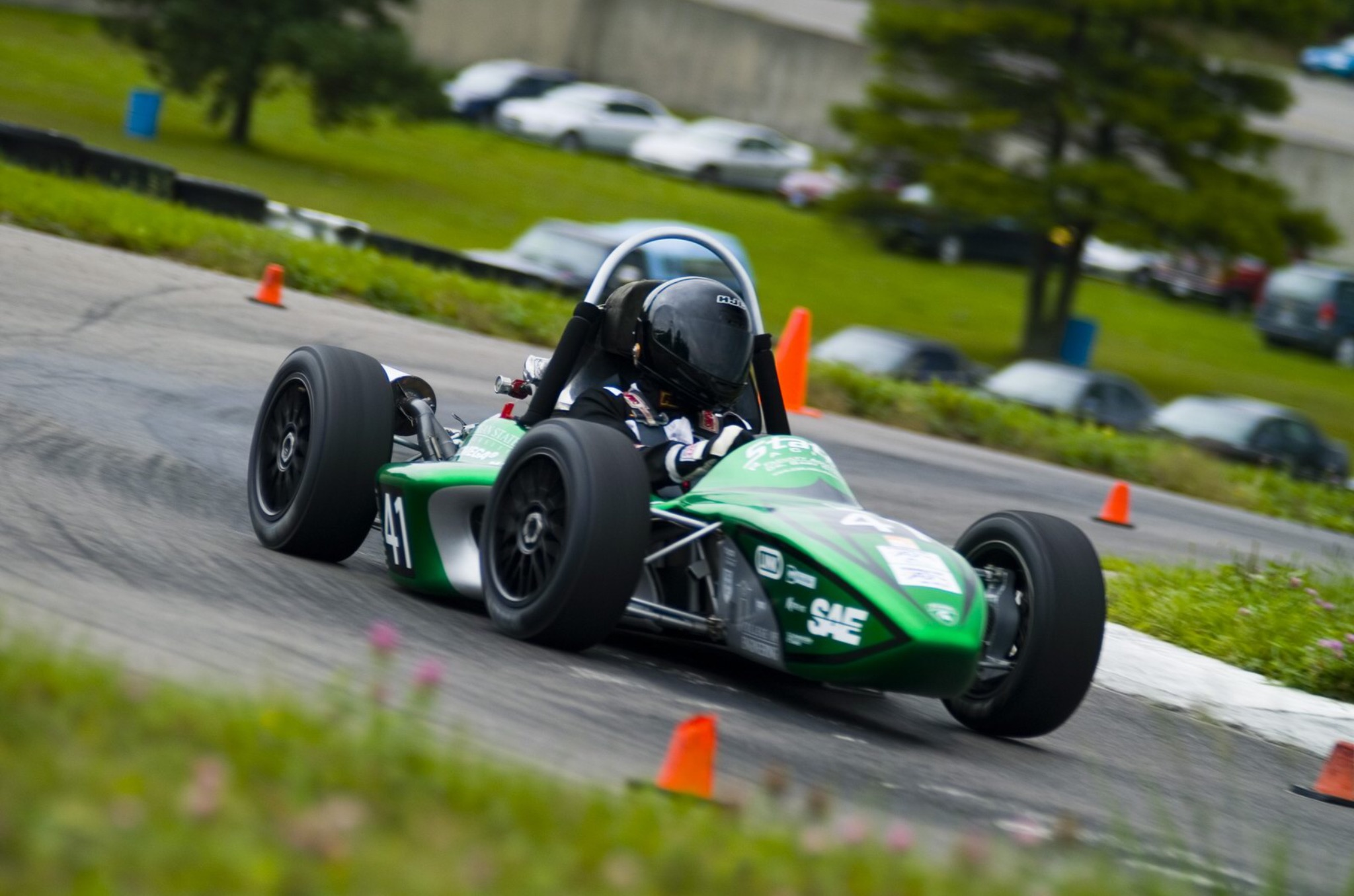
MSU FSAE Car 41 at the 2006 University of Toronto Shootout

While in college, Zemke was a member of the Formula SAE team. In 2008, Michigan State's vehicle placed 4th at the Formula SAE West competition in Fontana, CA.

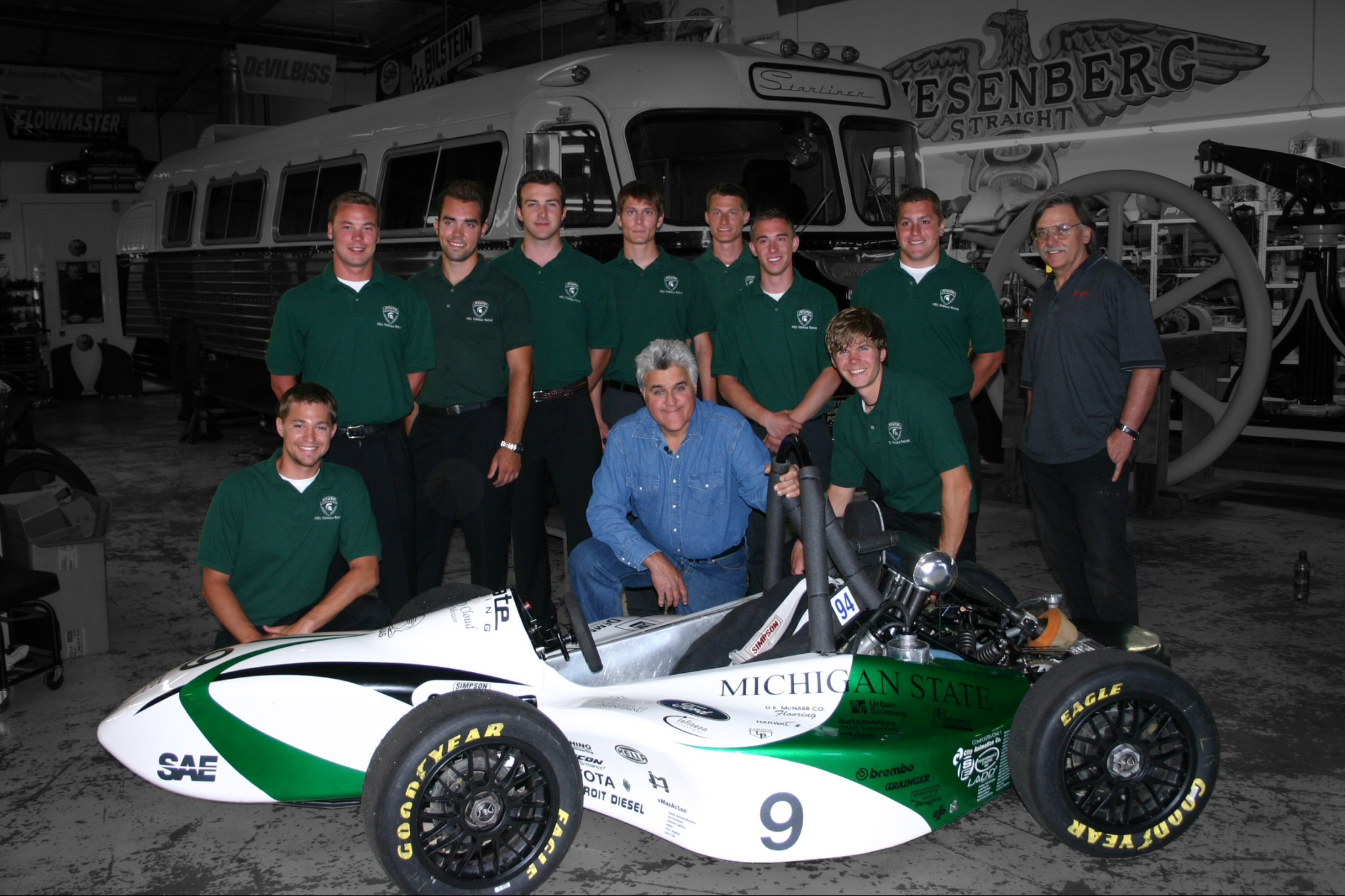
2007 MSU FSAE Team at Jay Leno's garage

Jay Leno invited the MSU Formula SAE Team to his Big Dog Garage in Burbank, CA for an exposé on the Formula SAE competition. Zemke remains a strong supporter of Formula SAE, serving as Presentation Event Captain and a member of the organizing committee for the competition held annually in Michigan.

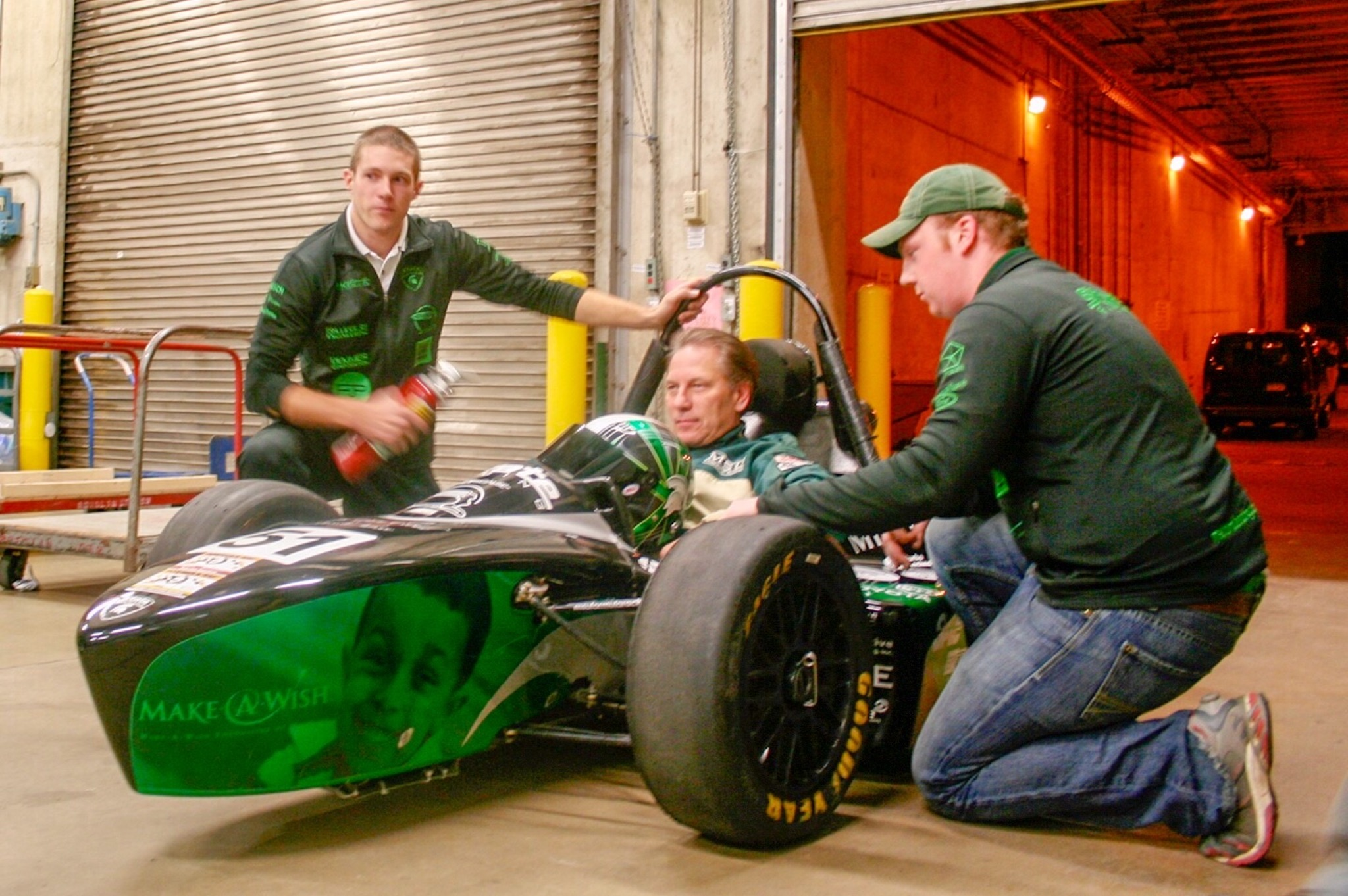
MSU FSAE Team preparing Car 51 for Coach Tom Izzo before Midnight Madness

== Political career ==
=== Michigan House of Representatives ===
After a failed run for the Washtenaw County Board of Commissioners in 2010, Zemke ran for the 55th district in the Michigan House of Representatives in 2012 — a seat that was held by Republican Rick Olsen — who declined to run due to changes in the district boundaries following the 2011 reapportionment. Zemke faced Pittsfield Charter Township Trustee Andrea Brown-Harrison in the Democratic primary election, where he won with 62% of the vote. He then faced Republican former Milan Mayor Owen Diaz in the general election where Zemke won the election with 64% of the vote. He was re-elected in 2014 and 2016, serving until he was term limited. Zemke won the election with over 69% of the vote.

==== 2016 Michigan House Democratic Caucus Campaign ====
In 2015, Michigan Democratic Leader Tim Greimel selected Zemke and Pam Faris to serve as chairpersons for the 2016 House Democratic campaign team and Representative Andy Schor (D-Lansing) as chairperson of the 2016 House Democratic finance team. Representative Faris later resigned from her position. In his role as campaign chairperson, Zemke drove his 1998 SVT Contour approximately 30,000 miles around the state helping Democratic candidates campaign for the Michigan House of Representatives.

==== 2018 Michigan House Democratic Caucus Chairpersonship ====
At the start of the 99th (2017–18) Michigan legislature, Zemke ran for election to become Chair of the House Democratic Caucus for the two-year term that comprises the 99th session of the Michigan House of Representatives. He won this election on January 12, 2017 and began the position immediately.

=== Ann Arbor Council of the Commons ===
In 2021, Zemke was appointed as chair of Ann Arbor's Council of the Commons, an advisory body to the city council tasked with implementing a 2018 change to the city charter to develop the roof of an underground parking structure as a park rather than the previously planned housing development. Other initial members included Alan Haber and Jeff Hayner. He served until the dissolution of the council in June 2023 by city council upon the recommendation of the Council of the Commons. During his tenure on the council, the site remained a parking lot and was not converted to a park.

=== 2024 State Board of Education race ===
In 2024 Zemke ran for the Michigan Board of Education. He failed to gain enough votes to become a member of the board, losing to Republicans Nikki Snyder and Tom McMillin and coming in behind Democrat Theodore Jones.
