= Felicia Brabec =

American politician and clinical psychologist

Member of the Michigan House of Representatives
- In office January 1, 2021 – December 31, 2024
- Preceded by: Rebekah Warren
- Succeeded by: Morgan Foreman
- Constituency: 55th district (2021–2022); 33rd district (2023–2024)

Personal details
- Born: c. 1974 (age 51–52) Aurora, Illinois
- Party: Democratic
- Education: Saint Mary's College (BA); Boston College (MA); Illinois School of Professional Psychology (PhD)
- Website: Felicia Brabec

Felicia Brabec (born c. 1974) is an American politician who served as a member of the Michigan House of Representatives from the 33rd district.

She was elected to the Michigan House of Representatives for the 55th district in 2020, and assumed office on January 1, 2021. In 2022, she was elected for the 33rd district, and assumed office in 2023. She chose not to seek re-election in 2024, instead preparing to run for state senate in 2026.

== Early life and education ==
Brabec was born around 1974 in Aurora, Illinois. In 1995, Brabec earned a bachelor's degree from Saint Mary's College. In 1997, Brabec earned a master's degree from Boston College. In 2003, Brabec earned a Ph.D. from the Illinois School of Professional Psychology. Later that year, Brabec moved to Ann Arbor, Michigan, for a post-doctoral fellowship at the University of Michigan.

== Career ==
Brabec is a clinical psychologist who owns her own private practice. She has worked in this capacity with the University of Michigan Counseling and Psychological Services. She has also served as a high school social worker. In 2020, in response to the COVID-19 pandemic, Brabec co-founded the website, MI Frontline Support, a statewide website which compiled mental health resources for frontline workers, who had to work during the pandemic. Brabec serves on the board of directors for the nonprofit food bank, Food Gatherers. She also is involved with the mental health organizations Garrett's Space and the Washtenaw Psychology Society.

Brabec was appointed to the Washtenaw County Board of Commissioners' 4th district seat in 2011. Brabec served as chair of the board from 2015 to 2016. In 2020, Brabec did not seek re-election, and instead ran for the Michigan House of Representatives representing the 55th district. On November 3, 2020, Brabec was elected to the Michigan House of Representatives and represented the 55th district starting on January 1, 2021. In 2022, Brabec was elected to represent the 33d district.

Brabec retired from the state House in 2024, planning instead to run in the 2026 Michigan Senate election. She endorsed, and was succeeded by, her director of constituent services, Morgan Foreman, in the state House.

== Personal life ==
Brabec lives in Pittsfield Charter Township, Michigan. Brabec is married to David. Together they have two children.
