= Leon Drolet =

American politician

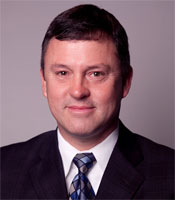

Macomb County Commissioner
- In office 2017-2020
- In office 2006–2008
- In office 1999–2000

Member of the Michigan House of Representatives from the 33rd district
- In office January 1, 2001 – December 31, 2006
- Preceded by: Janet Kukuk
- Succeeded by: Kim Meltzer

Personal details
- Born: January 9, 1967 (age 59)
- Party: Republican
- Education: Attended Oakland University, Institute for Humane Studies
- Occupation: Michigan Taxpayers Alliance Chair
- Website: Michigan Taxpayers Alliance

Leon Drolet (born January 9, 1967) is a Michigan Republican politician and Anti-tax activist elected Macomb County Commissioner. He is a political activist known for his conservative fiscal views, which have caused criticism from politicians from both sides, including Candace Miller, L. Brooks Patterson and Mark Hackel. From 2001 to 2006, Drolet served in the Michigan House of Representatives. Drolet also served as a Macomb County, Michigan county commissioner from 1999 to 2000 and from 2006 to 2008. Drolet was active in the Southeast Michigan Tea Party Movement.

== Michigan Civil Rights Initiative chairmanship ==
In the 2006 election, he acted as statewide Chair of the Michigan Civil Rights Initiative. The Michigan Civil Rights Initiative used the petition process to place a state constitutional amendment (Proposal 2 of November 2006) before voters that prohibits governments in Michigan from discriminating against, or giving preferential treatment to, any citizen on the basis of race, gender, ethnicity or national origin in the operation of government hiring, contracting, or state university admissions. The amendment was approved by 58% of voters despite the fact that proponents were heavily outspent in the campaign by opponents who supported race-based government preference programs.

== Eminent domain reform ==
During his final term in the state legislature, Drolet co-authored a state constitutional amendment that prohibited governments in Michigan from using their power of eminent domain to seize citizens' private property and turn it over to new owners for their private use. This proposed amendment was Proposal 4 in the November 2006 election and was overwhelmingly adopted by voters.

== Michigan Taxpayers Alliance recall effort ==
After serving his final term in the Michigan state House, Drolet founded the Michigan Taxpayers Alliance, which he currently serves as chairman. In 2008, Drolet served as Treasurer of Michigan Recalls, which sought the recalls of several state legislators for their votes in favor of income and business tax increases during Michigan's budget crisis in 2007.

After a highly acrimonious petition drive and numerous local and federal court battles, Drolet was obtained the needed signatures to force a recall election against the Speaker of the Michigan House, Andy Dillon (D-Redford Twp.).The prolonged court battles, however, had the effect of postponing the recall election from the targeted August 2008 primary ballot to the November 2008 general election ballot. Speaker Dillon won the recall vote by a significant margin and was reelected to office.

=== Case law ===
Legal disputes over petition irregularities cited in challenges by Representative Dillon lead to the case of Bogaert v. Land. In the ruling, United States District Judge Robert Holmes Bell agreed with recall supporters that part of Michigan's law governing recall signature gathering was unconstitutional because it infringed on political speech rights protected in the First Amendment. Bell ruled that signatures from voters inside Dillon's district should be counted even if they were collected by petition circulators who lived outside the district or weren't registered to vote. Under Michigan law, those signatures were not previously considered valid.

=== Award ===
Drolet received the 2008 Defender of Liberty Award from the Libertarian Party of Michigan. Drolet's work on the Michigan Civil Rights Initiative, eminent domain reform, the Andy Dillon Recall effort, and legislation he authored relating to third-party ballot access were cited as reasons for the award.

== 2010 State Senate campaign ==
In 2010, Drolet ran for an open state senate seat in Michigan's heavily-Republican 11th district. The GOP primary pitted Drolet against incumbent state representative Kim Meltzer and former state representative Jack Brandenburg, and was widely portrayed by media as the most contentious primary in the state (political newsletter Gongwer News described the race as, "The Macomb County Chainsaw Massacre"). Drolet was attacked by opponents for his vote against placing a state constitutional amendment banning same-sex marriage on the 2006 ballot and for his opposition to the drug war. Meltzer mailed literature to voters accusing Drolet of introducing legislation to legalize "gay sex in public" and Drolet sued Meltzer for libel. Brandenburg won the primary and was elected to the senate seat, Drolet finished second and Meltzer placed third. Meltzer and Drolet settled the libel suit when Meltzer issued a public apology for her campaign's untrue allegations against Drolet and paid Drolet an undisclosed sum of money.

== Arizona's Proposal 107 management ==
After his senate primary defeat, Drolet became campaign manager for Arizona's Proposal 107—a proposed constitutional amendment on the November, 2010 state ballot. Proposal 107 would prohibit governments in Arizona from employing affirmative action policies that discriminate against, or grant preferences to, any individual or group based on race, ethnicity or gender in government hiring, contracting, or public university admissions. Arizona voters passed Proposal 107 by a 59.5% to 40.5% margin.

== Defeat of 2016 RTA millage ==
In 2016, after defeating incumbent Macomb County Commissioner Joseph Sabatini in the August Republican primary election, Drolet led the campaign to defeat a millage initiative to fund the Regional Transit Authority of Southeast Michigan on the November ballot. The proposal would increase property taxes in Wayne, Oakland, Macomb, and Washtenaw counties for the purpose of increasing regional mass transit spending by $4.7 billion over 20 years. Drolet organized the committee to oppose the tax increase as Treasurer of NoMassiveTransitTax.org. Proponents of the initiative spent over $3.1 million on the 'yes' vote campaign and Drolet's opposition campaign spent less than $65,000. The RTA proposal was defeated by an 895,306 yes to 913,392 no vote.

== Personal life ==
Drolet is openly gay.
