= Angerer =

Angerer is a surname. Notable people with the surname include:

- Karl Angerer (born 1979), German bobsledder
- Kathy Angerer (born 1957), American politician
- Nadine Angerer (born 1978), German footballer
- Pat Angerer (born 1987), American football player
- Paul Angerer (1927–2017), Austrian violist
- Peter Angerer (born 1959), German biathlete
- Tobias Angerer (born 1977), German cross-country skier
