= Rick Olson (Michigan politician) =

American politician (born 1949)

Member-elect of the Minnesota Senate from the 54th district
- Assuming office January 2027
- Succeeding: Eric Pratt

Member of the Michigan House of Representatives from the 55th district
- In office January 12, 2011 – January 1, 2013
- Preceded by: Kathy Angerer
- Succeeded by: Adam Zemke

Personal details
- Born: Richard Thomas Olson; November 18, 1949 (age 77)
- Party: Democratic (DFL) (since 2026)
- Other political affiliations: Republican (before 2026)
- Spouse: Linda
- Children: 2
- Education: Michigan State University; Stanford Law School
- Profession: lawyer, businessman

Richard Thomas Olson (born November 18, 1949) is an American politician and current member-elect of the Minnesota Senate for the 54th district, representing Prior Lake. He served in the Michigan House of Representatives from 2011 to 2013, serving as a Republican before switching to run as a Minnesota Democratic-Farmer-Labor Party member for Minnesota Senate.

== Early life ==
Raised in the Upper Peninsula area of Michigan, Olson is an alumnus of Michigan State University and Stanford Law School and is a lawyer by profession. He previously worked for the Washington State Legislature and Governor of Washington's office.

== Political career ==
Olson was elected to the Michigan House of Representatives as a Republican in 2010 and served until 2013. In 2019, he announced his intent to challenge Angie Craig for Minnesota's 2nd congressional district in 2020, as a Republican. In 2026, after Minnesota Senator Eric Pratt announced his campaign for U.S. House, Olson announced his campaign for the vacated state senate seat, now as a Democrat. He cited principles that "no longer align with the Republican Party," such as the rule of law and economic freedom, as his reason for switching parties. Olson won the general election by around 500 votes, defeating Minnesota Representative Ben Bakeberg (R-54B).

== Personal life ==
In 2014, he was severely injured after being struck by a vehicle while cycling near Saline Township, Michigan, where he resided.

He retired to Prior Lake, Minnesota with his wife Linda in 2015. Olson has two children.
