= Jeffrey Yaroch =

American politician

Member of the Michigan House of Representatives from the 33rd district
- In office January 1, 2017 – January 1, 2023
- Preceded by: Ken Goike

Personal details
- Born: October 18 Mount Clemens, Macomb County, Michigan
- Party: Republican
- Spouse: Sara
- Children: 2
- Education: Macomb Community College; Western Michigan University Cooley Law School
- Website: We Trust Yaroch

Jeffrey P. Yaroch is a former member of the Michigan House of Representatives.

Before being elected to the state legislature, Yaroch served as a firefighter and paramedic with the Clinton Township Fire Department. Yaroch also served on the Richmond City Council from November 1999 to December 2016.

Political offices
Preceded by Rick Outman	Michigan Representatives; 33rd District; 2017–present	Succeeded by Incumbent
