= Langford and Lydia McMichael Sutherland Farmstead =

- Sutherland, Landgford and Lydia McMichael, Farmstead
- U.S. National Register of Historic Places
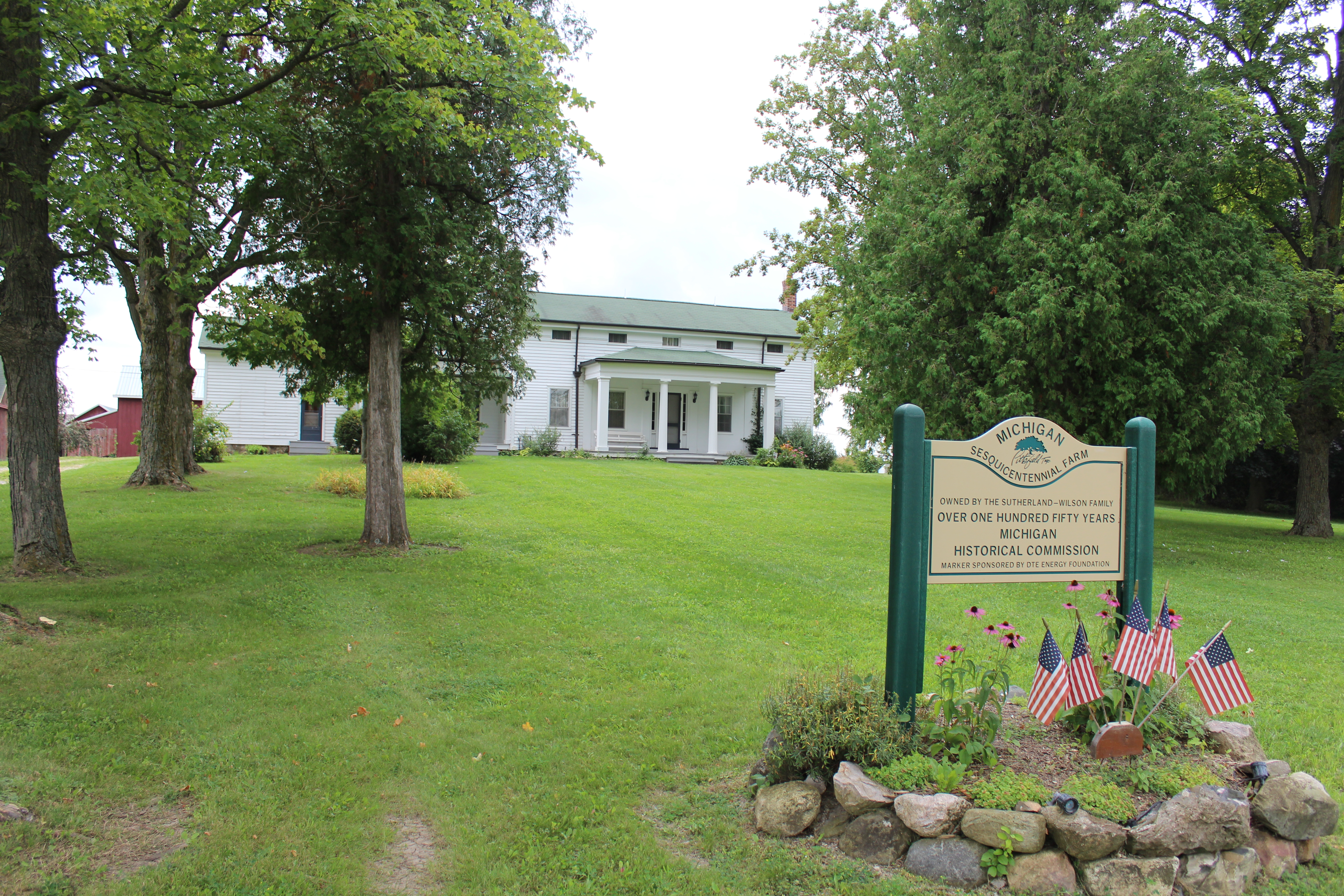
- Interactive map
- Location: 797 Textile Rd., Pittsfield Charter Township, Michigan
- Coordinates: 42°11′57″N 83°44′26″W
- Area: 4.6 acres (1.9 ha)
- Architectural style: Greek Revival
- NRHP reference No.: 05000711
- Added to NRHP: May 16, 2006

The Langford and Lydia McMichael Sutherland Farmstead is a farm located at 797 Textile Road in Pittsfield Charter Township, Michigan. It was listed on the National Register of Historic Places in 2006. It is now the Sutherland-Wilson Farm Historic Site.

== History ==
In 1832, Langford and Lydia Sutherland moved from Ontario County, New York, to this farm. They first constructed a log house to live in, then built the Greek Revival-style house that is still on the property. Langford Sutherland died in 1865, after which his son Tobias lived on the farmstead, with his mother and his wife, Harriet Knaouse. Tobias's son Ernest also lived here with his wife Delia Rheinfrank. Their only child, Mildred, married Arthur Wilson, and their son Harold also lived on the farmstead through 2000. The Sutherland farmstead was owned by the Sutherland family for over one hundred years.

In 1999 the farmstead was sold to Pittsfield Township, to be operated and managed as a farm museum by the Pittsfield Township Historical Society.

== Description ==
The Sutherland Farmstead includes a Greek Revival farmhouse and five outbuildings located along a farm lane running past the farmhouse. These buildings include a gable roof wood shed, carriage house, pig pen, large barn, and an icehouse.

- Farmhouse: The farmhouse is a 1 1/2-story Greek Revival building, sided with clapboard and on a fieldstone foundation. In the center of the front facade is a half-length porch with a half-hipped roof supported by Doric and square columns. The main entrance is flanked by sidelights and pilasters, and topped by a row of dentils under a wide entablature. The house windows have six-over-six lights. The roof cornices have cornice returns, and frieze windows are above. A single-story addition, originally a kitchen, is on one end. A modern garage is located behind the house.
- Icehouse: The icehouse is a one-story gable-roofed wood-framed building on a stone foundation. It has horizontal wood siding and two entrances.
- Barn: The large barn is a gabled structure of timber post-and-beam construction, and sits on a stone foundation. It is a two-level structure built into the side of a hill, so that both levels are accessible. The barn has plank siding, and there are entrances on all sides.
- Carriage House: The carriage house is of similar construction to the barn, but with mortise and tenon joints. There are openings for both vehicle and pedestrian traffic.
- Pig Pen: The pig pen is a single story gable-roofed structure on a wood and concrete foundation. It is wood framed with vertical board and batten siding.
- Wood Shed: The wood shed is similar to the pig pen, with a gable roof and vertical siding.
