= County Farm Park =

Public park in eastern Ann Arbor, Michigan

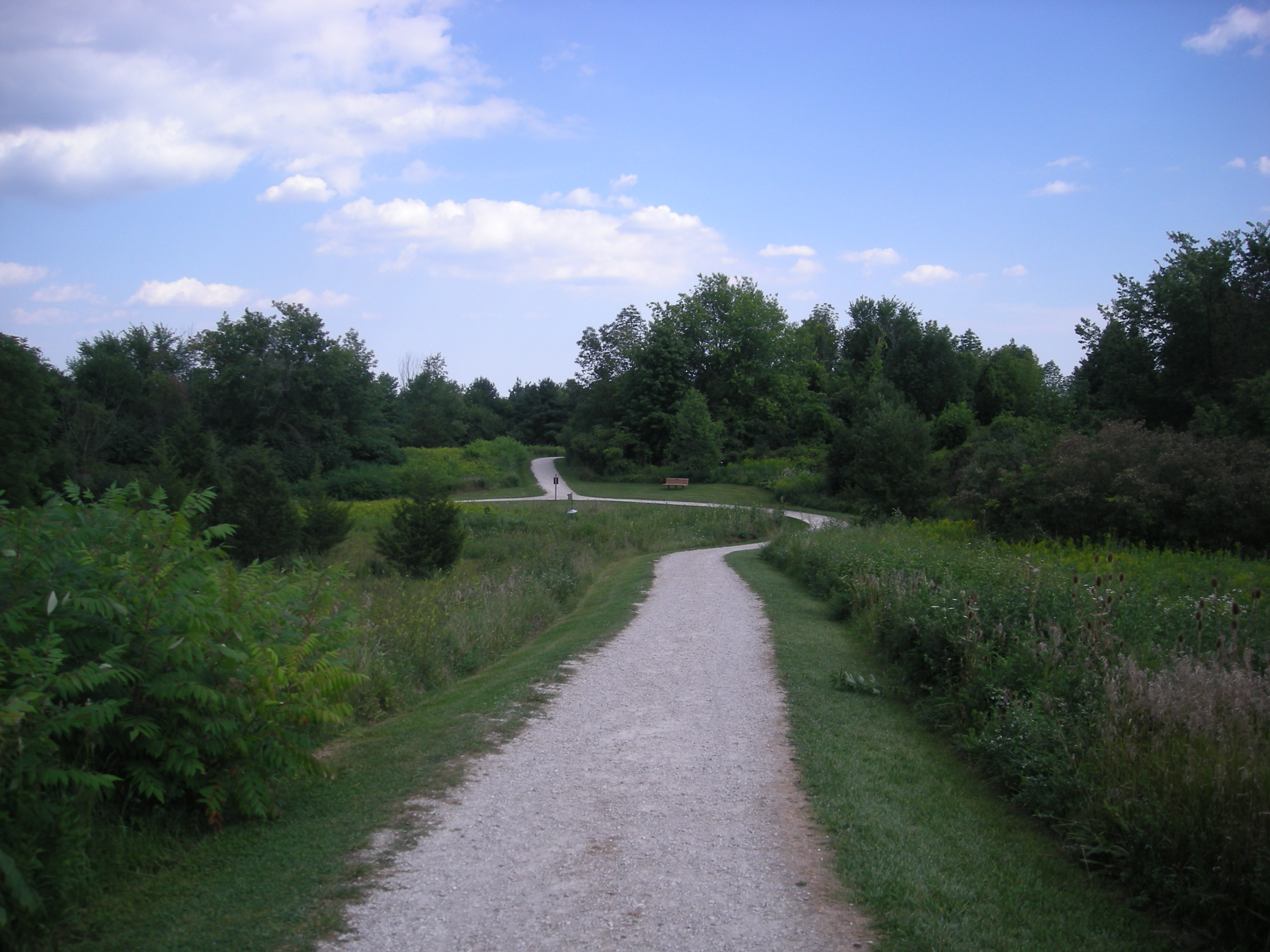
- The Outer Loop trail at County Farm Park

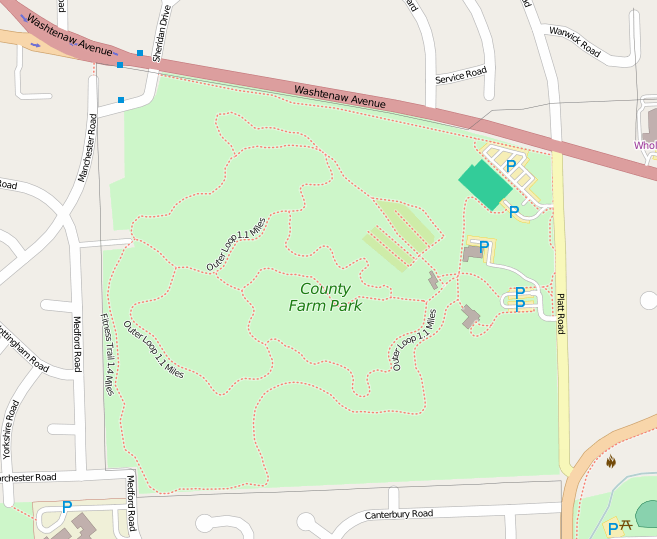
- Map of County Farm Park
- Type: Public park
- Location: Ann Arbor, Michigan
- Coordinates: 42°15′21″N 83°42′22″W
- Area: 141 acres (57 ha)
- Created: 1972
- Operator: Washtenaw County Parks and Recreation Commission
- Status: Open all year (daily 8am to dusk)

Nelson Meade County Farm Park is a 141-acre public park in eastern Ann Arbor, Michigan owned by Washtenaw County and operated by the county's Parks and Recreation Commission. Consisting of a mix of woodlands, fields, and gardens, the park is home to a wide variety of flora and fauna and is a popular local destination for gardening, hiking, jogging, and biking. The park has been county land since 1836, although for the majority of the nineteenth and twentieth centuries it was used as the county's poorhouse (complete with a working farm) and then as its infirmary. In 1972, the site began transitioning to parkland with the creation of community gardens, and over the next couple decades various trails and a perennial garden were created. Since 2000, the park has experienced significant ecological restoration efforts, including the removal of invasive plants, prairie restoration, and the creation of a wet meadow during the restoration of Malletts Creek.

== Background ==
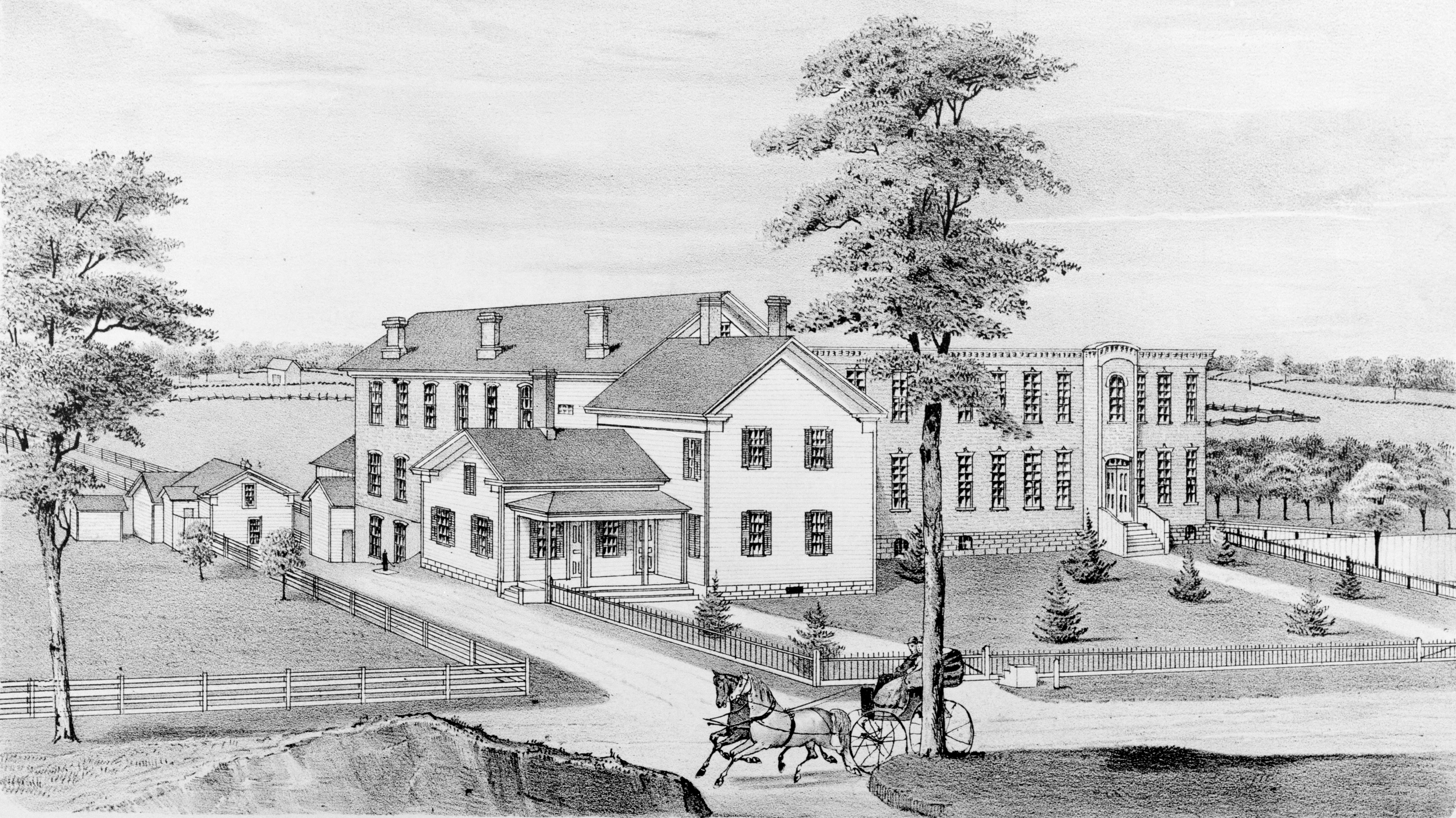
The County Poor House in 1874

The land that now constitutes County Farm Park was bought by Washtenaw County in 1836 from local resident Claudius Britton for $1,200. In order to comply with an 1830 Michigan Territory law requiring every county in the territory to construct and operate a poorhouse, Washtenaw County opened the County Poor House on the site in 1837. The Poor House was home to a diverse group of impoverished people, including those with physical and mental disabilities, injuries, illnesses, and those who were transient or simply unlucky. The Poor House was operated by a "keeper", a local man with a background in agriculture who lived on site, while his wife was expected to cook for the residents. The Poor House was intended to be a self-sustaining working farm on which the residents covered their living expenses by growing and selling crops and livestock, although such sales never covered all of its costs except for a few years during the Civil War. The farm consisted of gardens used for growing vegetables and grains, orchards of apple, peach, and pear trees, and livestock including pigs, cattle, sheep, and chickens.

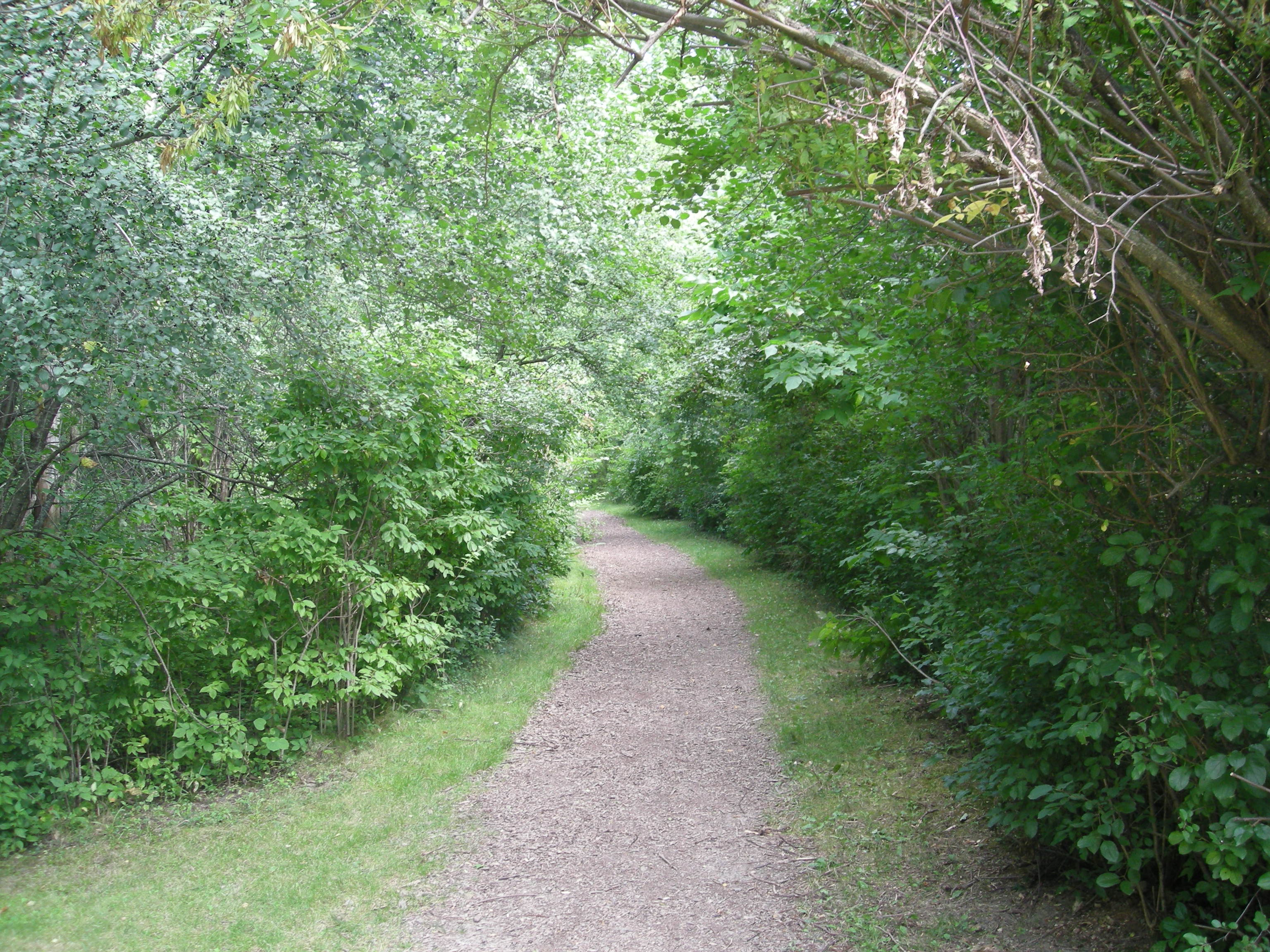
The fitness trail, originally known as the Parcour exercise trail

In 1917, the original Poor House building was replaced by a brick hospital known as the Washtenaw Infirmary. In the 1930s, the advent of modern welfare led to a shift in institutional emphasis from sheltering the poor to serving those who needed continual medical care but could not afford it. The Infirmary continued to operate until 1967, when it was required to either modernize or close. In 1971, the Infirmary was finally closed after county officials concluded that it would be too costly to modernize, and the building itself was torn down in 1979. After the closure of the Infirmary, Saint Joseph Mercy Hospital considered moving to the site, but eventually decided on relocating elsewhere. The county then contemplated building a new courthouse on the grounds of the old Poor House before the land was turned over to the county's Parks and Recreation Commission for the creation of County Farm Park.

The roots of the modern park itself go back to 1972, when Project Grow began gardening on eight acres of the site while the abandoned Washtenaw Infirmary building was still standing. In 1976, the Parcour exercise trail (now the fitness trail) was constructed as a jogging and exercise trail in the mold of European fitness courses. By the 1980s, the Project Grow gardens and the exercise trail had been joined by a woodland trail and a perennial garden on what was at the time 127 acres of park land. In 1991, the Meri Lou Murray Recreation Center was built on the site of the old Infirmary, at the northeastern corner of the park.

In 2013, the park was formally renamed "Nelson Meade County Farm Park" to honor the contributions of Nelson Meade (1927–2018), the commissioner of the Washtenaw County Parks and Recreation Commission, upon his retirement.

== Features ==
=== Britton Woods Nature Area ===
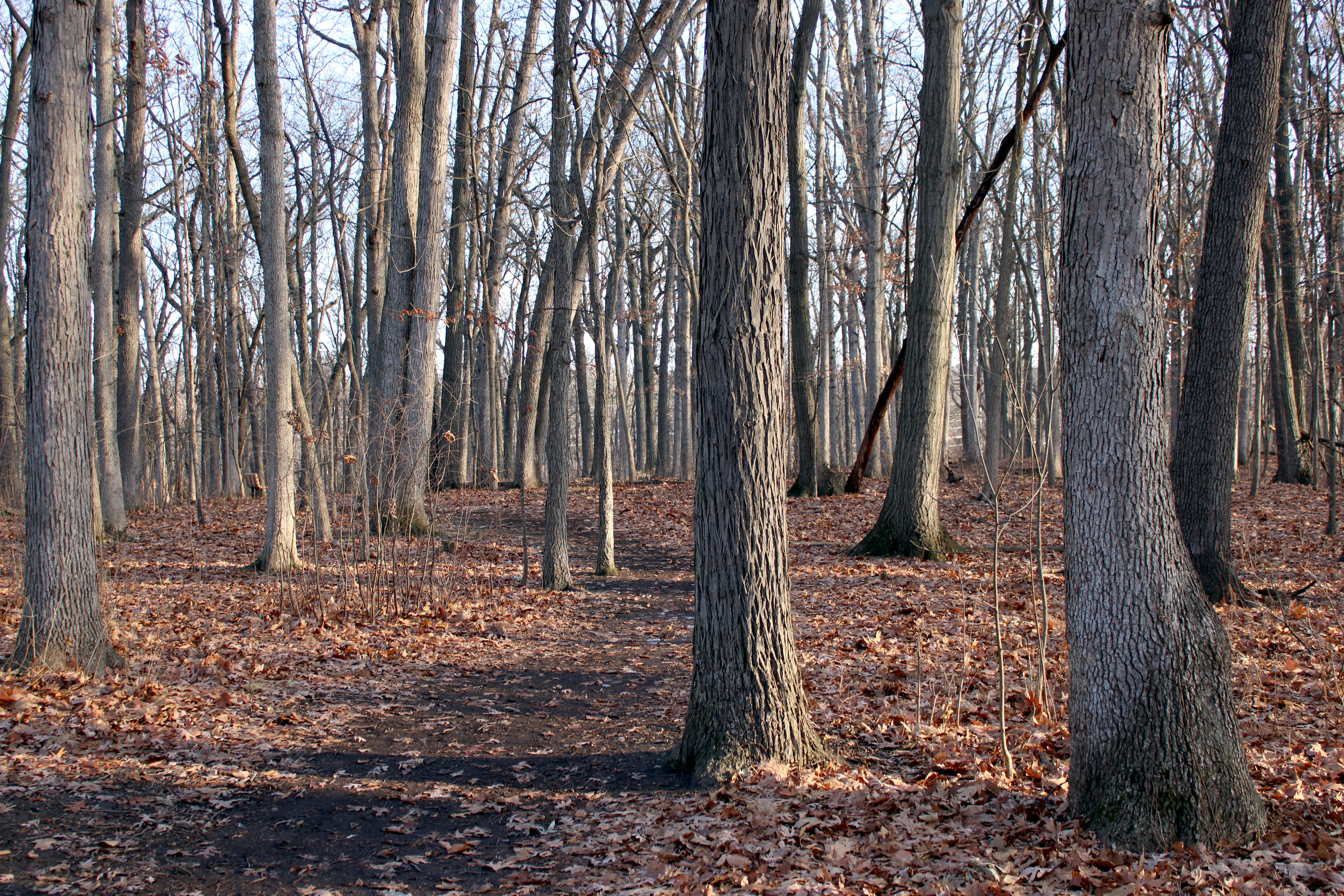
Britton Woods

County Farm Park contains the Britton Woods Nature Area, an 18-acre forested area named for Claudius Britton, the last private landowner of what is the modern park who sold the land to the county in 1836. It contains both upland and floodplain tree species, including upland oak, hickory, and cherry trees as well as floodplain maple, ash, ironwood, and hornbeam trees. Numerous species of wildflowers grow in Britton Woods, but the white trillium (Trillium grandiflorum) and Wild Geranium (Geranium maculatum) are the most common. Other native flowers, including Rue anemone (Thalictrum thalictroides), Yellow Violet (Viola pubescens), False Solomon’s Seal (Smilacina racemosa), Bloodroot (Sanguinaria canadensis), and Early Meadow Rue (Thalictrum dioicum), are also part of the ecosystem.

Together, the trees and wildflowers found in Britton Woods are representational of the wooded areas that existed in the Ann Arbor area before it was extensively settled. Ongoing ecological restoration takes place in the woods, which includes activities such as prescribed burns and the removal of invasive species such as honeysuckle (Lonicera) and buckthorn (Rhamnus).

=== County Farm Nature Area ===
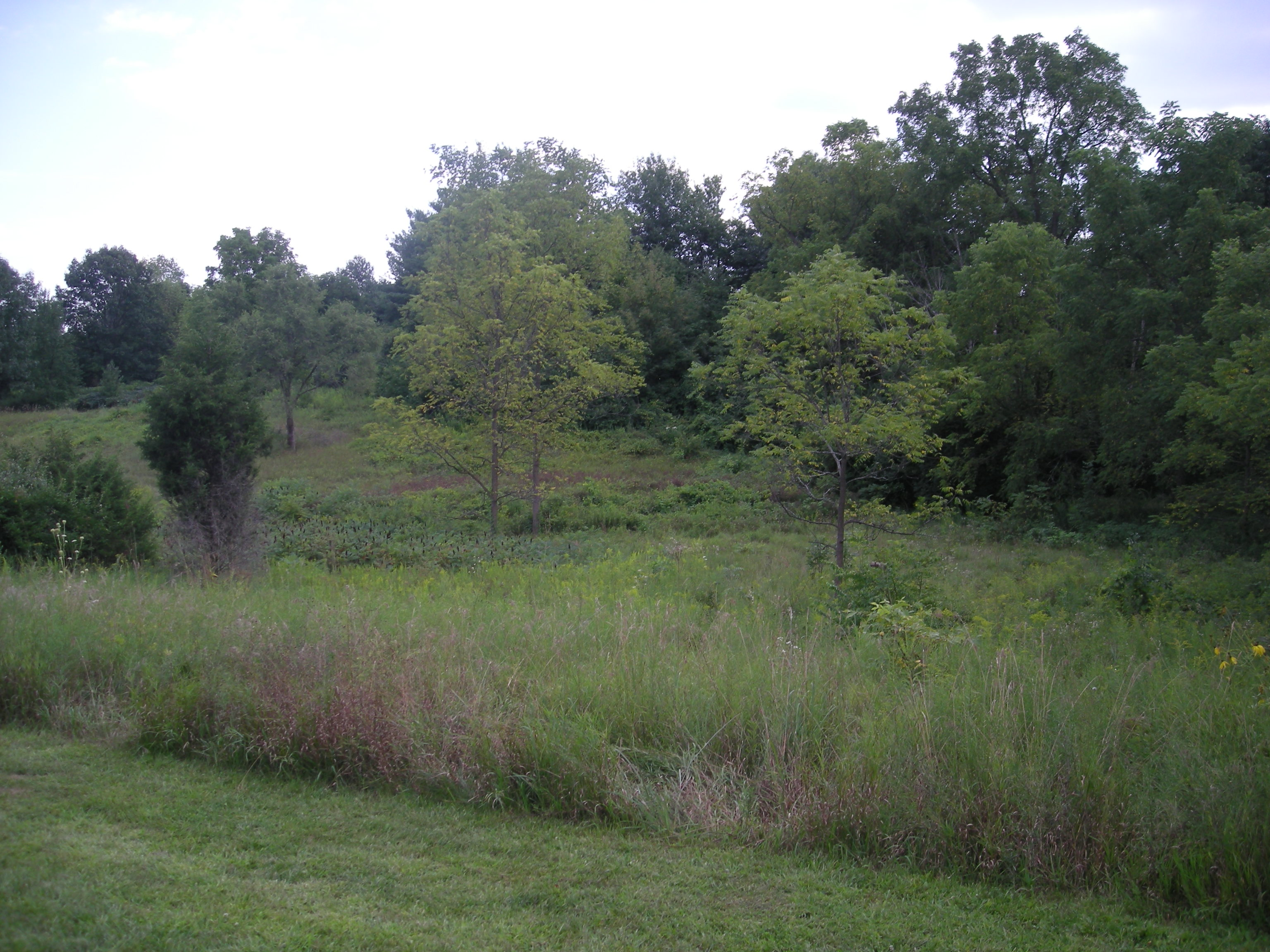
Fox Hollow Prairie

The County Farm Nature Area consists of the non-wooded remainder of County Farm Park, which was used for agricultural purposes before the park was established but has since been renaturalized with fields, hedges, and groundcover. The old field succession habitat is home to a multitude of different animals, including many bird species, rabbits, pheasant, woodchucks, and skunks, as well as the occasional fox or deer.

In 2009, the Fox Hollow area of the County Farm Nature Area was planted as a prairie through a partnership between the Washtenaw County Parks and Recreation Commission and the Buhr Park Children's Wet Meadow Project. The process of planting the prairie was straightforward, consisting simply of raking the ground, removing loose materials, and then sowing the land with seeds collected from Buhr Park's wet meadows. A wide variety of seeds were used in the planting, including yellow coneflower, Ironweed, prairie dock, Indiangrass, sneezeweed, and switchgrass, as well as various varieties of goldenrod, beardtongue, black-eyed Susan, and milkweed.

=== Malletts Creek ===
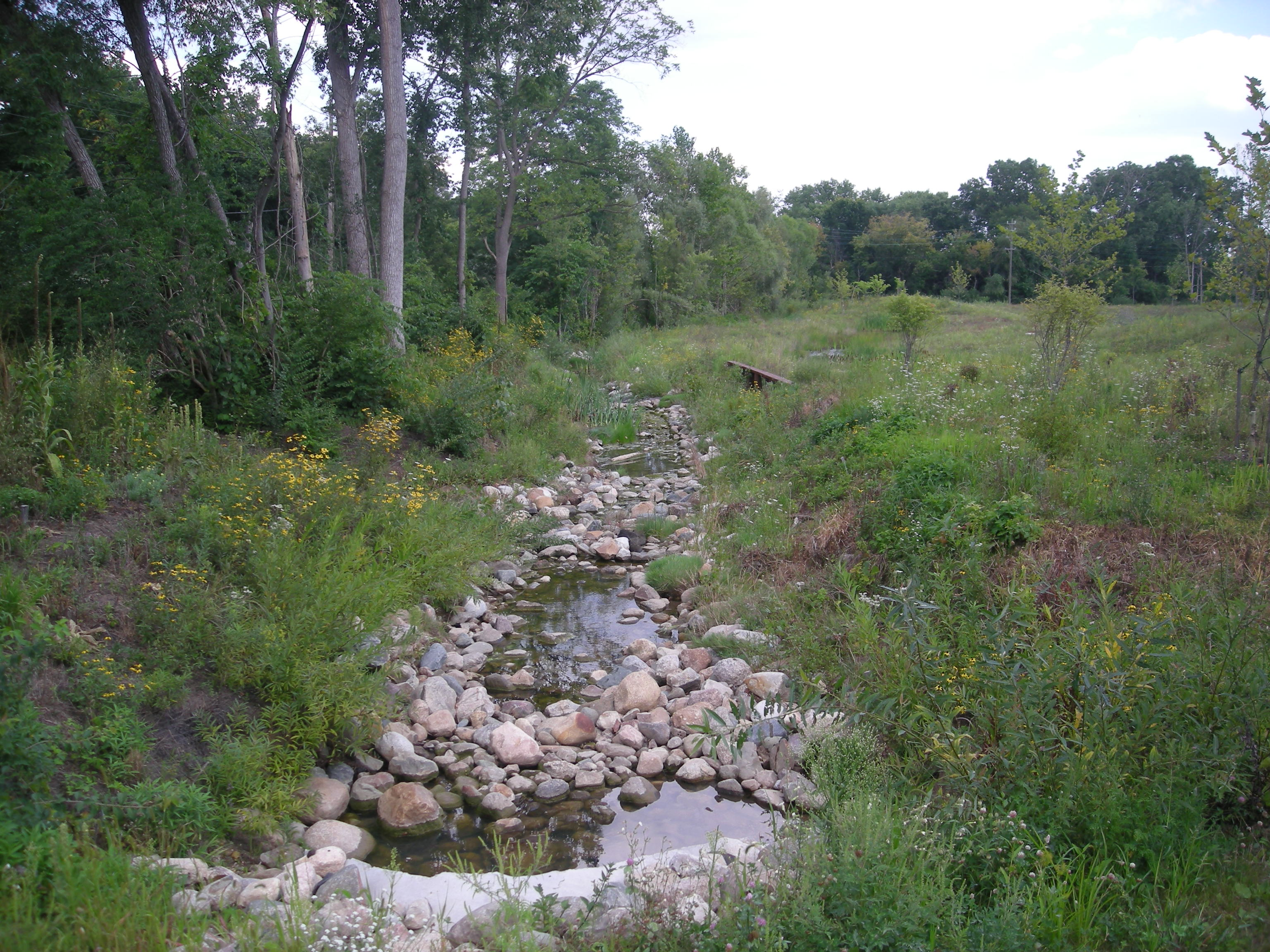
A tributary of Malletts Creek within the park

Malletts Creek is a tributary of the Huron River and the most substantial waterway in the City of Ann Arbor at a length of 4.7 miles (7.6 km). A tributary of Maletts Creek flows through County Farm Park, and in 2011 and 2012 a portion of this tributary within the park was converted into a three-acre wet meadow with native vegetation. The conversion was part of a larger Malletts Creek restoration project that cost $2.8 million and resulted in the accidental death of an excavator operator, although it was successful in mitigating the threat of erosion to the creek and reducing the amount of phosphorus that flowed through it and into the Huron River by 25 percent.

=== Gardens ===
County Farm Park has a wide variety of different gardens, including an octagonal perennial flower garden, a "native grasses display" on the Outer Loop trail, and a "Kids & Trees" nursery near the children's playground. It also includes the Project Grow Community Gardens, which consist of 84 total plots in two sections available for rental by individuals. Project Grow's gardens at County Farm Park constitute the oldest and largest part of its network, which in total consists of 15 individual sites and over 350 separate plots throughout the Ann Arbor area. The Project Grow gardens at County Farm Park have been in existence since 1972, when they emerged as a direct product of the environmental and community gardening movements of the 1970s, although they were also substantially influenced by the world war-era tradition of "victory gardens".

==== Gallery ====
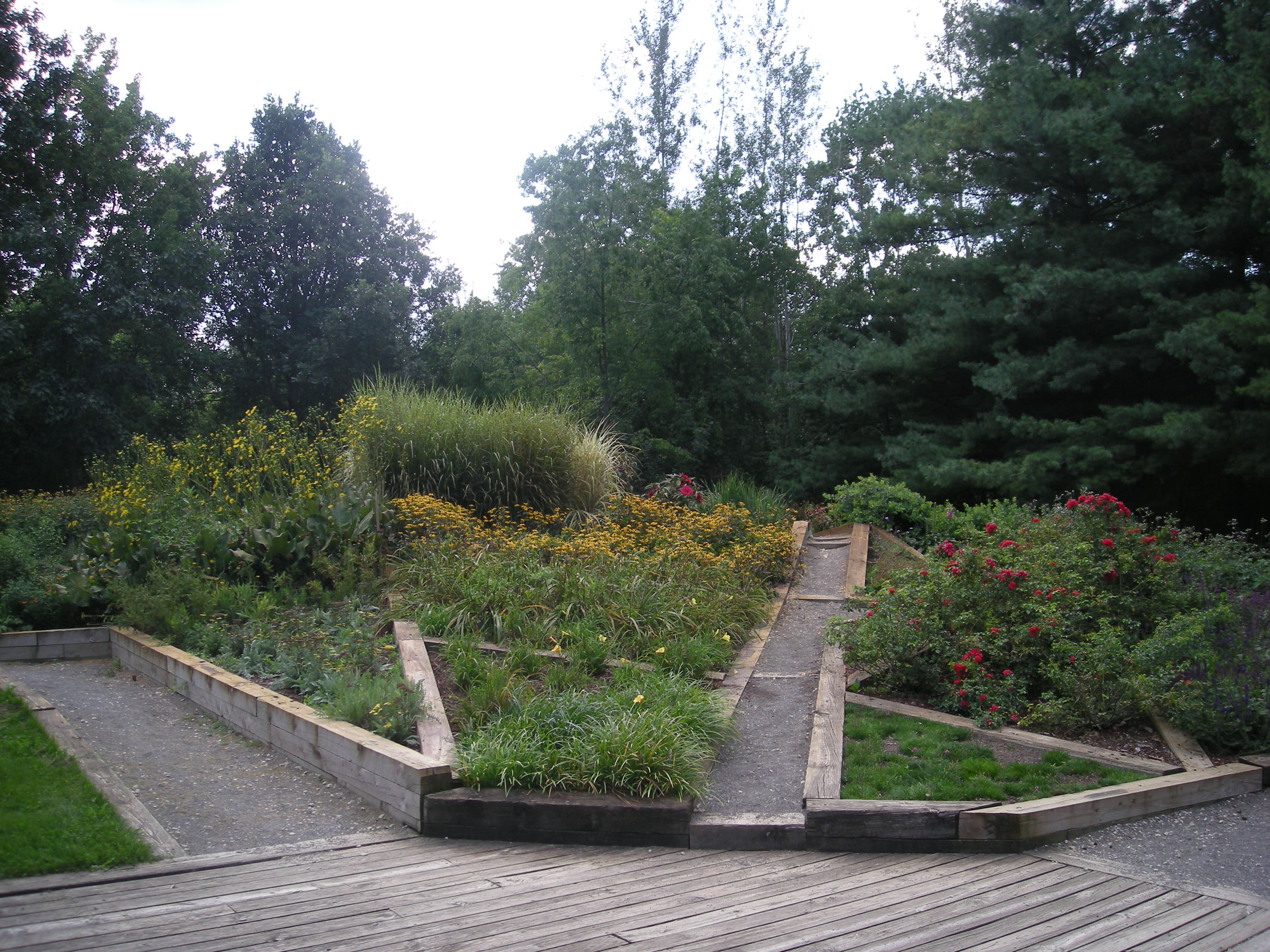
Perennial Flower Gardens

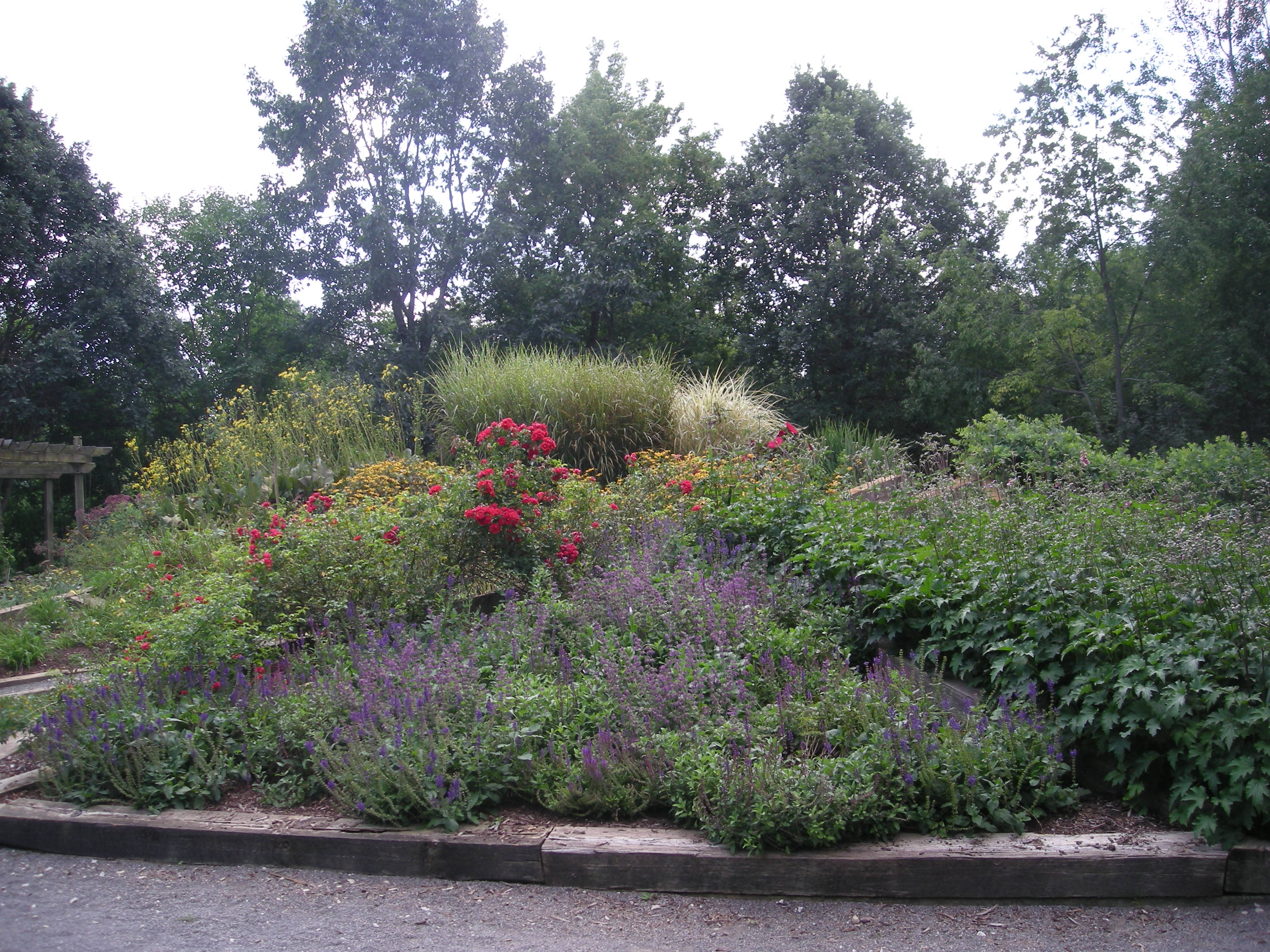
Perennial Flower Gardens

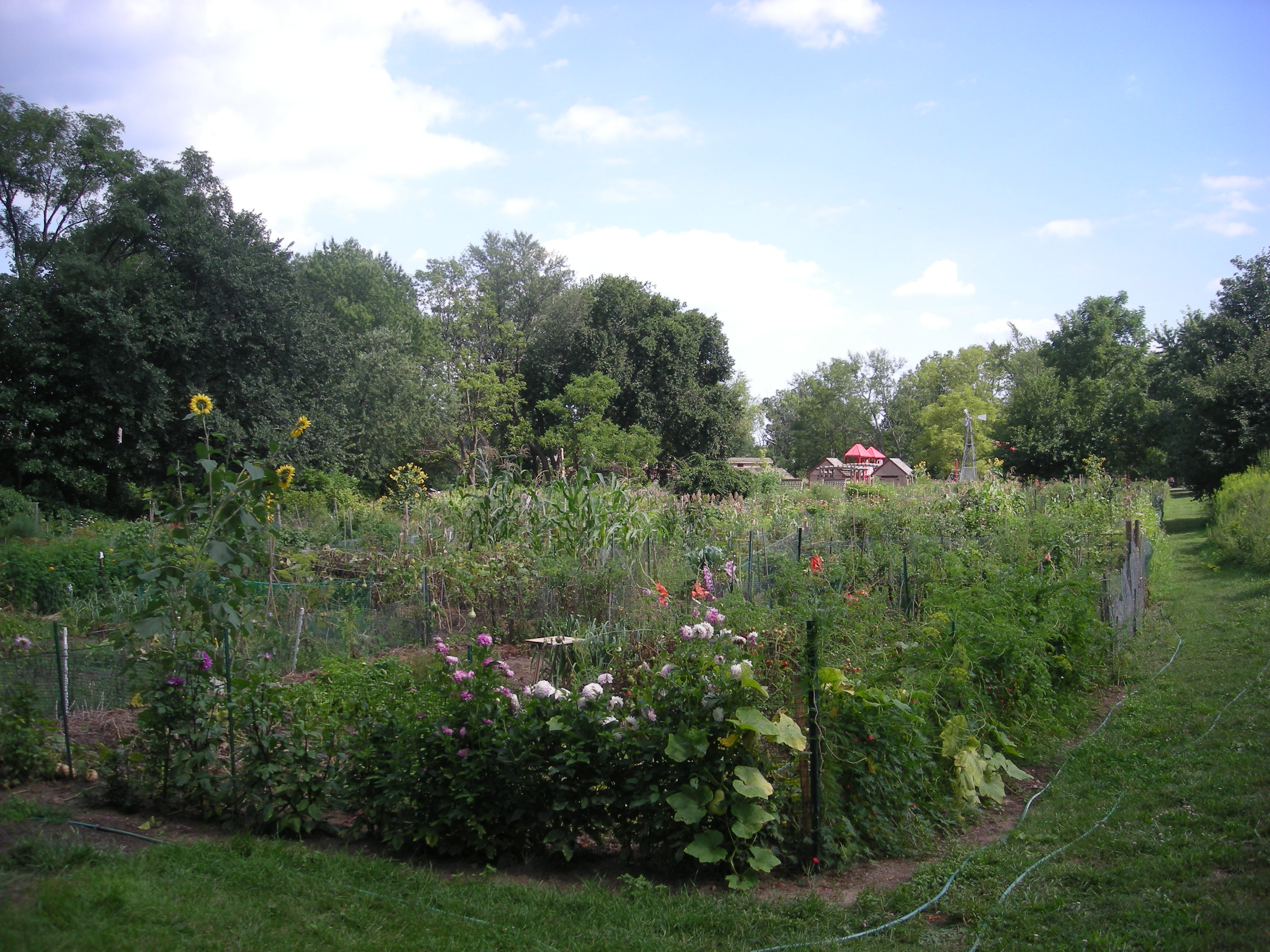
Project Grow Community Gardens

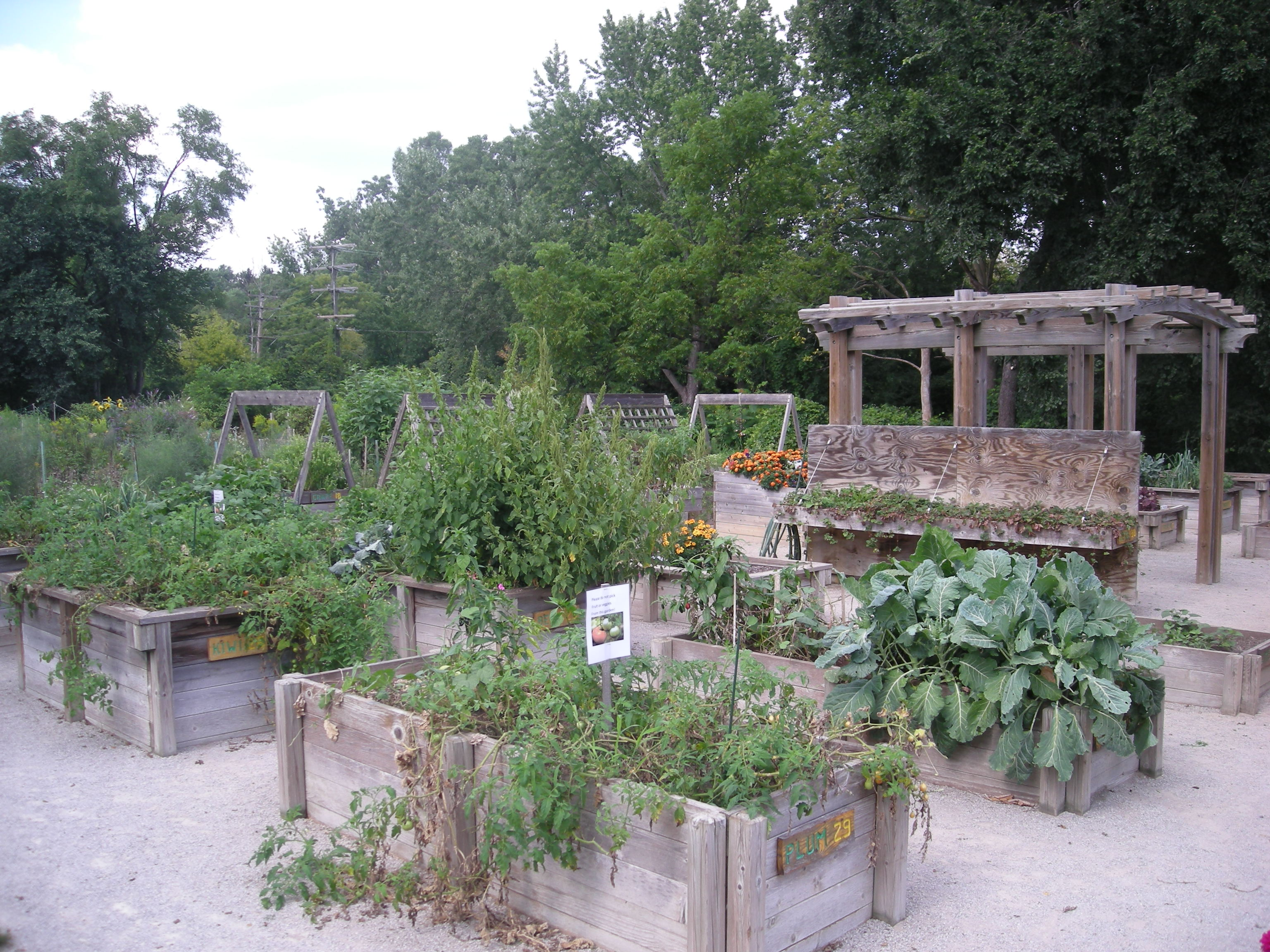
Project Grow Community Gardens
