= Kimberly Meltzer =

American politician (born 1964)

Member of the Michigan House of Representatives from the 33rd district
- In office January 1, 2007 – 2010
- Preceded by: Leon Drolet
- Succeeded by: Ken Goike

Personal details
- Born: January 1, 1964 (age 62)
- Party: Republican
- Spouse: Clarence
- Children: 3
- Education: Wayne State University; Michigan State University

Kimberly Meltzer (born January 1, 1964) is a former member Michigan House of Representatives.

== Early life ==
Meltzer was born on January 1, 1964.

== Education ==
Meltzer earned a B.A. from Wayne State University in political science and educational certifications in urban and rural planning from Michigan State University.

== Career ==
Meltzer served on the Clinton Township Board from 2000 to 2004. On November 7, 2006, Meltzer was elected to the Michigan House of Representatives where she represented the 33rd district from January 1, 2007, to 2010. Meltzer did not win re-election in 2010.

== Personal life ==
Meltzer married Clarence around 1990. Together, they had three children.
