= Michigan's 55th House of Representatives district =

American legislative district

Michigan's 55th State House of Representatives district
Representative
Mark Tisdel; R–Rochester Hills
- Demographics: 73.1% White; 3.5% Black; 4.6% Hispanic; 13.2% Asian; 0.1% Native American; 0.3% Other; 5.2% Multiracial
- Population (2024): 92,667

Michigan's 55th House of Representatives district is a legislative district within the Michigan House of Representatives located in Oakland County. The district was created in 1965, when the Michigan Supreme Court ordered the reapportionment of state legislative districts from a county-based system to a proportional one following the Supreme Court case Reynolds v. Sims. It is currently represented by Republican Mark Tisdel of Rochester Hills.

== List of representatives ==
Representative	Party	Years	Residence	Notes
James S. Farnsworth	Republican	1965–1972	Plainwell	Lived in Otsego until around 1967.
Wayne B. Sackett	Republican	1973–1976	Portage	
Donald H. Gilmer	Republican	1977–1982	Augusta	
William Van Regenmorter	Republican	1983–1990	Jenison	
Jessie F. Dalman	Republican	1991–1992	Holland	
Beverly Swoish Hammerstrom	Republican	1993–1998	Temperance	
Gene DeRossett	Republican	1999–2002	Manchester	
Matt Milosch	Republican	2003–2004	Lambertville	
Kathy Angerer	Democratic	2005–2010	Dundee	
Rick Olson	Republican	2011–2012	Saline	
Adam Zemke	Democratic	2013–2018	Ann Arbor	
Rebekah Warren	Democratic	2019–2020	Ann Arbor	
Felicia Brabec	Democratic	2021–2022	Pittsfield Township	
Mark Tisdel	Republican	2023–present	Rochester Hills	
Alex Hawkins	Democratic	(Note: Member-elect.)	Rochester Hills	

== Historical district boundaries ==
Map	Description	Apportionment Plan	Notes
	Allegan County (part): Dorr Township; Fillmore Township; Gun Plain Township; Heath Township; Hopkins Township; Leighton Township; Martin Township; Monterey Township; Otsego; Otsego Township; Overisel Township; Plainwell; Salem Township; Wayland Township; Barry County (part): Baltimore Township; Barry Township; Hope Township; Johnstown Township; Orangeville Township; Prairieville Township; Yankee Springs Township; Ottawa County (part): Holland (part); Jamestown Township; Zeeland (part); Zeeland Township	1964 Apportionment Plan	
	Allegan County (part): Leighton Township; Wayland Township; Barry County (part): Excluding; Orangeville Township (part); Kalamazoo County (part): Excluding; Alamo Township; Cooper Township; Kalamazoo; Kalamazoo Township; Parchment; Portage (part); Prairie Ronde Township; Oshtemo Township; Schoolcraft Township; Texas Township	1972 Apportionment Plan	
	Ottawa County (part): Georgetown Township; Holland; Holland Township; Hudsonville; Jamestown Township; Zeeland; Zeeland Township	1982 Apportionment Plan	
	Monroe County (part): Macon Township; Monroe County (part): Bedford Township; Dundee Township; Exeter Township; Ida Township; London Township; Milan; Milan Township; Petersburg; Summerfield; Whiteford Township; Washtenaw County (part): Augusta Township; Bridgewater Township; Freedom Township; Lodi Township; Manchester Township; Milan; Saline; Saline Township; Sharon Township; York Township	1992 Apportionment Plan	
	Monroe County (part): Bedford Township; Dundee Township; Erie Township; Milan (part); Milan Township; Petersburg; Summerfield; Whiteford Township; Washtenaw County (part): Milan (part); Pittsfield Township (part); Saline Township (part); York Township	2001 Apportionment Plan	
	Washtenaw County (part): Ann Arbor (part); Augusta Township (part); Ann Arbor Township; Milan (part); Pittsfield Township (part); York Township	2011 Apportionment Plan	
	Oakland County (part): Oakland Charter Township (part); Rochester; Rochester Hills	2021 Apportionment Plan (Note: Referred to as the Hickory plan.)	

== Recent elections ==
=== 2020s ===
2026 Michigan House of Representatives election
Party	Candidate	Votes	%
Democratic	Alex Hawkins	24,858	51.8
Republican	Mark Tisdel (incumbent)	23,130	48.2
Total votes		47,988	100
Democratic gain from Republican			

2024 Michigan House of Representatives election
Party	Candidate	Votes	%
Republican	Mark Tisdel (incumbent)	29,026	53.73
Democratic	Trevis Harrold	24,993	46.27
Total votes		54,019	100
Republican hold			

2022 Michigan House of Representatives election
Party	Candidate	Votes	%
Republican	Mark Tisdel	23,210	51.8
Democratic	Patricia Bernard	21,601	48.2
Total votes		45,811	100
Republican gain from Democratic			

2020 Michigan House of Representatives election
Party	Candidate	Votes	%
Democratic	Felicia Brabec	37,118	72.37
Republican	Bob Baird	14,170	27.63
Total votes		51,288	100
Democratic hold			

=== 2010s ===
2018 Michigan House of Representatives election
Party	Candidate	Votes	%
Democratic	Rebekah Warren	30,185	74.0
Republican	Bob Baird	10,629	26.0
Total votes		40,814	100
Democratic hold			

2016 Michigan House of Representatives election
Party	Candidate	Votes	%
Democratic	Adam Zemke	30,097	69.3
Republican	Bob Baird	13,312	30.7
Total votes		43,409	100
Democratic hold			

2014 Michigan House of Representatives election
Party	Candidate	Votes	%
Democratic	Adam Zemke	19,085	67.9
Republican	Leonard Burk	9,030	32.1
Total votes		28,115	100
Democratic hold			

2012 Michigan House of Representatives election
Party	Candidate	Votes	%
Democratic	Adam Zemke	26,197	64.5
Republican	Owen Diaz	13,029	32.1
Green	David McMahon	1,415	3.5
Total votes		40,641	100
Democratic gain from Republican			

2010 Michigan House of Representatives election
Party	Candidate	Votes	%
Republican	Rick Olson	17,295	52.9
Democratic	Mike Smith	15,381	47.1
Total votes		32,676	100
Republican gain from Democratic			

2008 Michigan House of Representatives election
Party	Candidate	Votes	%
Democratic	Kathy Angerer	33,234	66.1
Republican	Frank Moynihan	17,054	33.9
Total votes		50,288	100
Democratic hold			
