= Ken Goike =

American politician (born 1955)

Macomb County Commissioner from the 1st district
- Incumbent
- Assumed office January 24, 2025
- Preceded by: Don Brown

Member of the Michigan House of Representatives from the 38th district
- In office January 1, 2011 – December 31, 2016
- Preceded by: Kim Meltzer
- Succeeded by: Jeffrey Yaroch

Personal details
- Born: August 13, 1955 (age 70)
- Party: Republican

Ken Goike (born August 13, 1955) is a Republican member of the Macomb County Board of Commissioners. Goike previously served in the Michigan House of Representatives from 2011 to 2016 where he represented north-east Macomb County.
