= Alvin H. Kukuk =

American politician

Member of the Michigan House of Representatives from the 33rd district
- In office January 1, 1993 – December 31, 1998
- Preceded by: William R. Keith
- Succeeded by: Janet Kukuk

Personal details
- Born: May 21, 1937
- Died: April 22, 2017 (aged 79) Baton Rouge, Louisiana
- Party: Republican

Military service
- Branch/service: Michigan Army National Guard
- Unit: 182nd Field Artillery Battalion

Alvin Harold Kukuk was a Republican member of the Michigan House of Representatives from 1993 through 1998.

Kukuk was a member of the Army National Guard and a volunteer firefighter. He also served as Macomb Township supervisor for eight years and as a county commissioner for two terms.

In the House, Kukuk was a strong opponent of abortion, introducing a bill to revoke the medical license of any doctor who performed an abortion based on the gender of the fetus. He also opposed legislation to repeal the ban on hunting on Sundays in Macomb County.

Kukuk was succeeded in the House by his then-wife Janet. He was twice an unsuccessful candidate for the Michigan Senate, including in 2001 after the expulsion of David Jaye.

Kukuk died on April 22, 2017, in Baton Rouge, Louisiana, aged 79.
