= Sneezeweed =

Sneezeweed is a common name for several plants in the family Asteraceae and may refer to:

- Achillea ptarmica, with white flowers
- Hymenoxys hoopesii, with long yellow petals, native to western North America
- Various species of Helenium, with short yellow petals, native to North and Central America
- In Australia, Centipeda cunninghamii or "old man weed" is also referred to as common sneezeweed
