= Kathy Angerer =

American politician (born 1957)

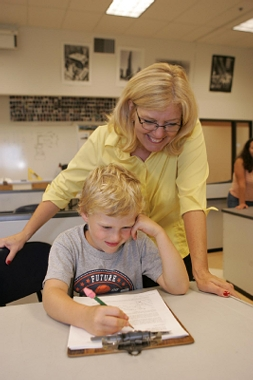

Member of the Michigan House of Representatives from the 55th district
- In office January 1, 2005 – December 31, 2010
- Preceded by: Matt Milosch
- Succeeded by: Rick Olson

Personal details
- Born: November 16, 1957 (age 68) Carleton, Michigan
- Party: Democratic

Kathy Angerer (born November 16, 1957) is the deputy director of the Michigan Department of Agriculture and Rural Development. She was formerly the City Manager, Director of Community & Economic Development, and Director of Community and Governmental Affairs for the city of Hamtramck, Michigan (2013). Prior to that, she was Executive Director of Government Affairs at AT&T Michigan from 2011 to 2013. From 2005 to 2010, she served as Democratic State Representative in the Michigan State House of Representatives, representing the 55th House District which covers parts of Monroe County and Washtenaw County. During her final term ending in 2010, she served as the Majority Floor Leader of the Michigan House of Representatives.

== Biography ==
Angerer grew up in Carleton, Michigan, and is a lifelong Monroe County resident. She graduated from St. Mary's Academy in Monroe; attended Monroe County Community College. and is a graduate of Eastern Michigan University. She has five adult children. Prior to serving as State Representative, Angerer was the Communications Director for the Dundee Community Schools, where she successfully worked with a coalition of parents, teachers, and administrators to pass a millage expanding the size of Dundee High School.

As a legislator, Representative Angerer was noted to author legislation brought to her by residents of her district. Two such examples include her legislation to fix problems with railroad crossing inspections and to expand the Michigan Promise Grant program. She also authored legislation creating a statewide Patient Safety Organization to which all state hospitals must report adverse effects for the purpose of learning from mistakes and improving patient safety. One of her biggest priorities as a State Representative was legislation requiring insurance companies to cover treatment for children with autism, which while unsuccessful while she was in office, she continued to be a strong leading advocate towards final passage in 2012.

For the 95th Session of the Legislature in 2009, Angerer was elected by her colleagues to be the Majority Floor Leader. She had served as the Assistant Floor leader during the previous sessions.

Early in her service, Angerer was named Legislator of the Year by the Michigan Pharmacists' Association, the Hemophilia Foundation of Michigan, the Michigan Agri-Business Association. She was named as a Public Policy Health Champion in 2008 by the Michigan Department of Community Health. The Southwest Lake Erie Chapter of Waterfowl U.S.A. named her as Outstanding Sportsperson of the Year for 2009. In 2010, she was named Legislator of the Year by both the Michigan Association of Chiropractors and the Michigan Distributors and Vendors Association.

== 2004 election ==
Angerer was elected to the State House in 2004, beating incumbent Republican Matt Milosch. The race was one of the most expensive in Michigan in 2004, with over $500,000 spent between the two candidates and parties. Pundits credited Angerer's win with a strong door-to-door campaign which began in March of that year. Milosch was criticized for making statements against the minimum wage.

== 2006 election ==
Angerer was the lone Democrat running for State Representative in the district. She once again faced Republican Matt Milosh in the general election, and she was reelected. Again, Angerer's win was attributed to aggressive campaigning. She had also developed a strong reputation for delivering good service to her constituents as she visited more than 11,000 resident's homes during the campaign "off-season" to become aware of their concerns and help them with any state government-related issues. Angerer bested Milosch in the general election, outspending him nearly three-to-one.

== 2008 election ==
Again, Angerer was unchallenged in the Democratic primary. She beat Republican challenger Frank Moynihan in the November election. Moynihan was the surprise winner of the Republican primary, who ran a rather unconventional campaign. He refused to speak directly to the media and maintained a spartan website. As such, this race was seen by pundits to be heavily one-sided and led to Angerer improving on her vote-totals for the third straight election.

== Electoral history ==
Michigan State Representative 55th District Election 2004
Party	Candidate	Votes	%	±%
Democratic	Kathy Angerer	24,299	50.33	n/a
Republican	Matt Milosch	23,980	49.66	n/a
Majority		319	0.0066	
Turnout		48,279	100	
Democratic gain from Republican		Swing		

Michigan State Representative 55th District Election 2006
Party	Candidate	Votes	%	±%
Democratic	Kathy Angerer	23,409	63.92	+14.26
Republican	Matt Milosch	13,208	36.07	−13.59
Majority		10,201	27.85	
Turnout		36,617	100	
Democratic hold		Swing		

Michigan State Representative 55th District Election 2008
Party	Candidate	Votes	%	±%
Democratic	Kathy Angerer	33,236	66.08	+2.16
Republican	Frank Moynihan	17,054	33.91	−2.16
Majority		16,182	32.17	
Turnout		50,290	100	
Democratic hold		Swing		

== Controversy ==
Kathy was appointed as the Interim City Manager on July 11, 2017, in a meeting that involved much yelling and disagreement between council members. Her appointment was a point of contention on the Hamtramck Council. On August 7, 2018, in the primary election, a City Charter Amendment was adopted, changing the way the City Manager is appointed. Speculation as to whether this was written to specifically accommodate Angerer or whether it was written to open up the broader City Manager search was unsure. Artists and residents handed out flyers encouraging voters to vote against the proposal, saying it would give the council too much power to waive eligibility requirements.

On August 28, 2018 at the regular Hamtramck City Council Meeting, a resolution was brought forth for "Approval of Appointment of Kathleen Angerer as Hamtramck City Manager" At 7:48pm, two council members, Andrew Perrotta and Andrea Karpinski, exited the meeting in protest, in order to break quorum. There was no action due to lack of quorum, and Kathy Angerer was not appointed as permanent City Manager.

Just within the Open Meetings' Act Time Frame, public comment and the resolution to appoint Kathy Angerer were added to a Special Meeting Agenda for Friday evening August 31, 2018 at 7 p.m. This happened to be the evening of one of the largest annual festivals in Hamtramck, a holiday weekend, and during famed local "Queen of Soul" Aretha Franklin's funeral.

As summarized by the Metro Times: "When the majority of the city council turns away from the fresh air and sunshine of public debate, concocts their plans in private, and then uses special meetings, narrowly controlled information, and lock-step voting to push an agenda, this is precisely the environment in which rumors not only flourish, they can’t be effectively quashed."

On November 26, 2019, the Tuesday before Thanksgiving, Kathy Angerer's employment contract was amended by Hamtramck City Council at a regularly scheduled meeting. The legislation proposed, Resolution 2019-110 Resolution to Amend Employment Agreement of Kathleen Angerer, was added to the agenda at the last minute. Changes to the contract include a $5,000 salary raise and severance pay equal to two years of salary (her previous contract included a severance of three months' salary). Councilmembers Karpinski and Perotta questioned why this item was added to the agenda with more than a year remaining in Kathy's previous contract. The resolution passed, with Aye votes from Councilmembers Almasmari, Miah, Musa, Al-Marsoumi, and Mayor Majewski and Nay votes from Councilmembers Perotta and Karpinski.
