= Janet Kukuk =

American politician

Janet Louise Bauer Rungtranont Kukuk (October 2, 1942 – November 19, 2000) was an American politician.

Born in Saginaw, Michigan, Kukuk graduated from Central Michigan University in 1965. She worked in college administration and lived in Macomb Township, Macomb County, Michigan. She was involved with the Republican Party. Her husband Alvin H. Kukuk served in the Michigan Legislature from 1993 through 1998. Kukuk served in the Michigan House of Representatives from 1999 until her death from cancer in 2000.
