= Pittsfield Charter Township, Michigan =

Pittsfield Township, Michigan
- Charter township
- Charter Township of Pittsfield
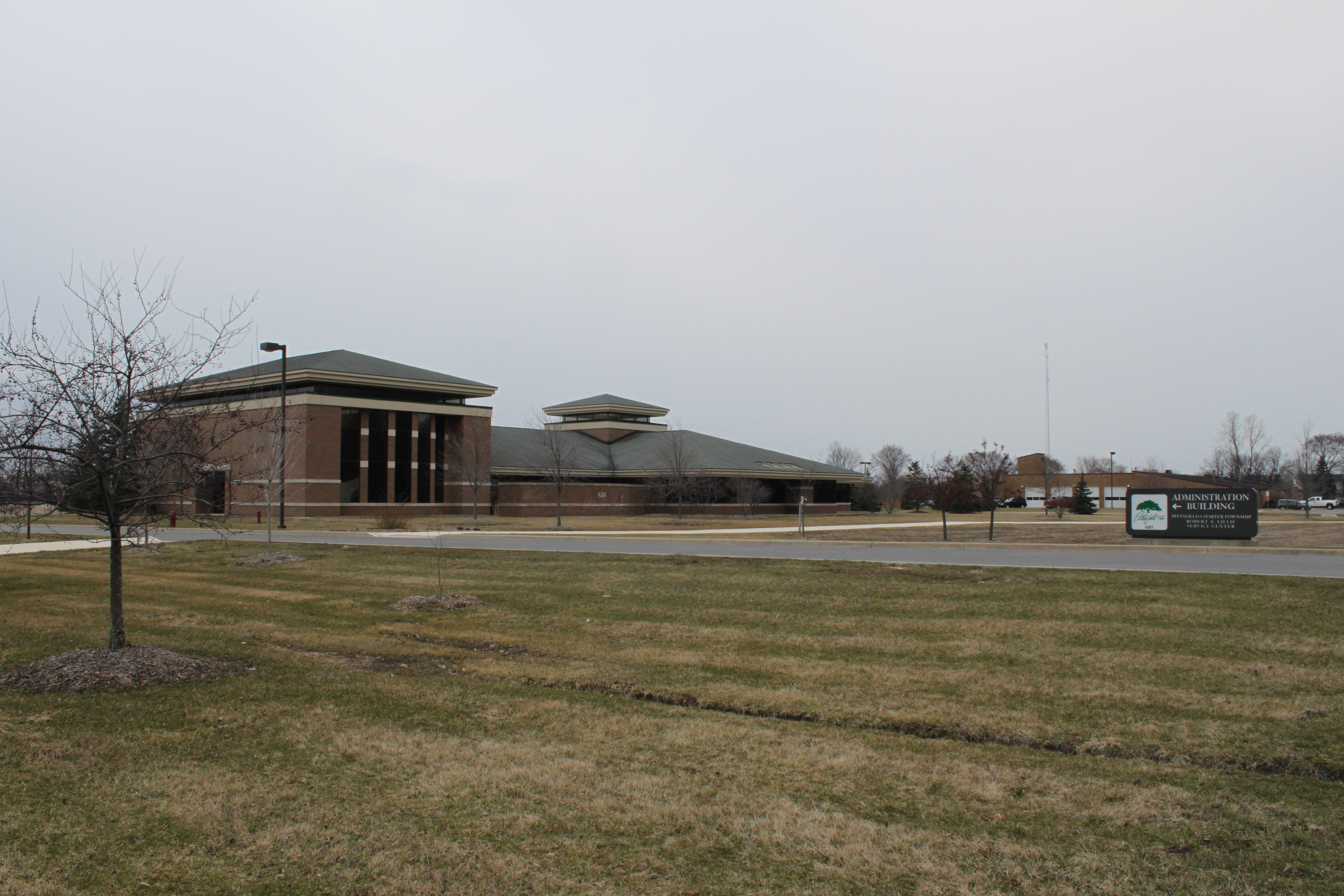
- Pittsfield Township Municipal Buildings

- Seal

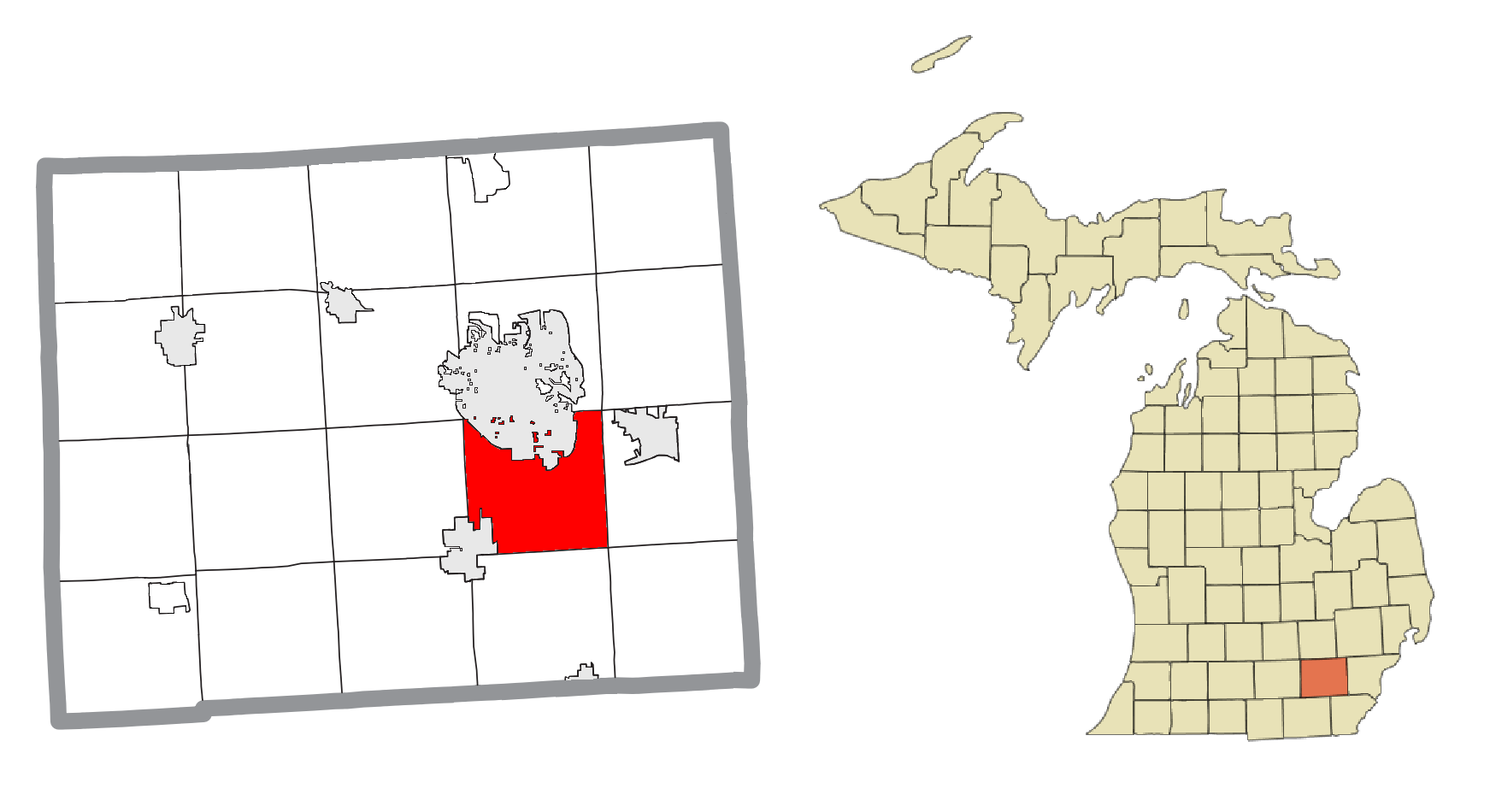
- Location within Washtenaw County

- Location within the state of Michigan Location within the United States
- Coordinates: 42°13′21″N 83°42′52″W
- Country: United States
- State: Michigan
- County: Washtenaw
- Established: 1834

Government
  - Supervisor: Trish Reilly
  - Clerk: Michelle Anzaldi

Area
  - Total: 27.33 sq mi (70.78 km^{2})
  - Land: 27.26 sq mi (70.60 km^{2})
  - Water: 0.069 sq mi (0.18 km^{2})
- Elevation: 827 ft (252 m)

Population (2020)
  - Total: 39,147
  - Density: 1,436/sq mi (554.5/km^{2})
- Time zone: UTC-5 (Eastern (EST))
  - Summer (DST): UTC-4 (EDT)
- ZIP code(s): 48103, 48108 (Ann Arbor); 48176 (Saline); 48197 (Ypsilanti)
- Area code: 734
- FIPS code: 26-64560
- GNIS feature ID: 1626909
- Website: Official website

Pittsfield Charter Township is a charter township of Washtenaw County in the U.S. state of Michigan. The population was 39,147 at the 2020 census.

== Communities ==
- Lucerne is a former settlement within the township that had its own post office from May 10, 1837, until July 5, 1853.
- Mallett's Creek is a former settlement within the township. It was named after the nearby stream Malletts Creek, and it was given a post office named Mallett's on June 4, 1834. The post office closed on January 23, 1840.
- Nebraska was a community settled in 1878 about 6.0 miles (9.7 km) east of Saline.
- Pittsfield is a former settlement within the township. George Noyes made the first land purchase in the area as early as 1824. The county's first school, the McCracken School, was built here in 1825. The settlement was formally named Pitt in 1831 and was named in honor of former English prime minister William Pitt. A post office named Pitt opened on January 21, 1835, but closed on September 14, 1836. The community was renamed Pittsfield in 1840. In 1878, a railway line along the Toledo & Ann Arbor Railroad was constructed through the area. The post office was reestablished under the name Pittsfield from September 1879 until it closed on December 31, 1907.

== History ==
When Ann Arbor Township was organized in 1827 it included what is now Pittsfield Township in its boundaries. The township was organized as the Township of Pitt in 1834. The name had been suggested by Ezra Carpenter. The current name was adopted in 1839. It became a charter township in 1972.

In 2006 the Ann Arbor District Library opened its Pittsfield branch.

== Geography ==
According to the U.S. Census Bureau, the township has a total area of 27.33 square miles (70.78 km^{2}), of which 27.26 square miles (70.60 km^{2}) is land and 0.07 square miles (0.18 km^{2}) (0.26%) is water.

The source of Paint Creek is within the northeast portion of the township.

=== Major highways ===
- I-94 runs through the northern section of the township.
- BL I-94 runs concurrently with US 23 briefly into the township before the business route ends at the I-94 interchange.
- US 12 (West Michigan Avenue) runs diagonally through southern half of the township.
- US 23 runs south–north through the eastern portion of the township.
- Bus. US 23 is a business loop that begins at the northern border of the township with Ann Arbor.

== Demographics ==
As of the 2010 census, Pittsfield had a population of 34,663. The ethnic and racial makeup of the population was 62.9% non-Hispanic white, 13.6% black or African American, 13.6% Asian, 0.4% Native American, 0.3% non-Hispanic of some other race, 4.0% reporting two or more races. 6.5% were Hispanic or Latino, of any race.

At the 2000 census there were 30,167 people, 11,817 households, and 6,960 families in the township. The population density was 1,095.4 inhabitants per square mile (422.9/km^{2}). There were 12,337 housing units at an average density of 448.0 per square mile (173.0/km^{2}). The racial makeup of the township was 70.37% White, 14.29% African American, 0.44% Native American, 9.96% Asian, 0.05% Pacific Islander, 1.68% from other races, and 3.21% from two or more races. Hispanic or Latino of any race were 3.97%.

Of the 11,817 households, 31.5% had children under the age of 18 living with them, 48.5% were married couples living together, 7.3% had a female householder with no husband present, and 41.1% were non-families. 29.8% of households were one person, and 4.1% were one person aged 65 or older. The average household size was 2.42 and the average family size was 3.11.

In the township the population was spread out, with 24.0% under the age of 18, 11.8% from 18 to 24, 39.6% from 25 to 44, 18.9% from 45 to 64, and 5.7% 65 or older. The median age was 32 years. For every 100 females, there were 107.8 males. For every 100 females age 18 and over, there were 108.1 males.

The median household income in the township was $61,262, and the median family income was $82,600. Males had a median income of $54,167 versus $35,684 for females. The per capita income for the township was $29,645. About 5.6% of families and 9.1% of the population were below the poverty line, including 9.5% of those under age 18 and 8.8% of those age 65 or over.

== Education ==
Pittsfield Charter Township is served by three public school districts. The northern portion of the township is served by Ann Arbor Public Schools, the southern portion of the township is served by Saline Area Schools, and the southeast portion is served by Milan Area Schools.

== Images ==
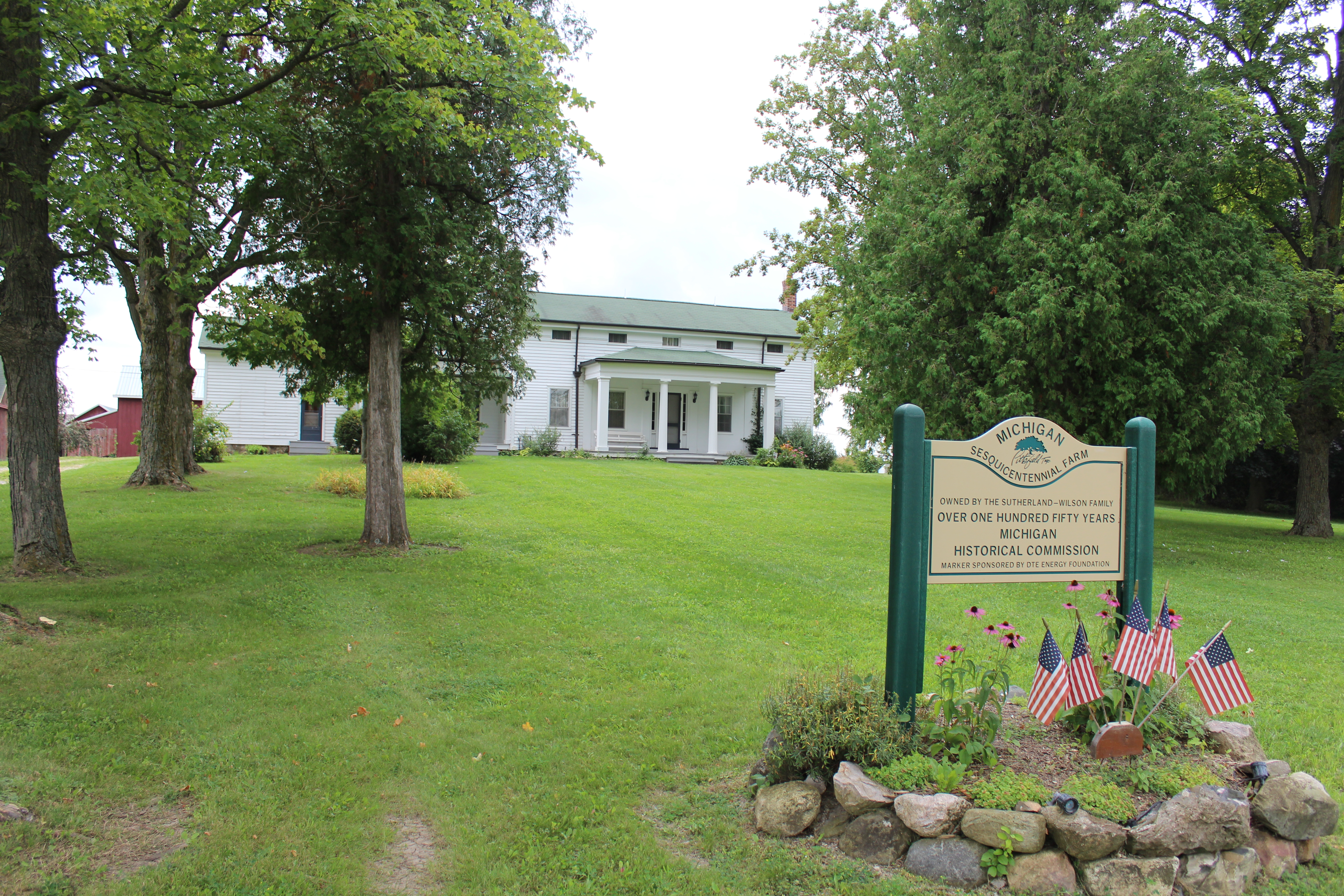
Sutherland–Wilson Farm

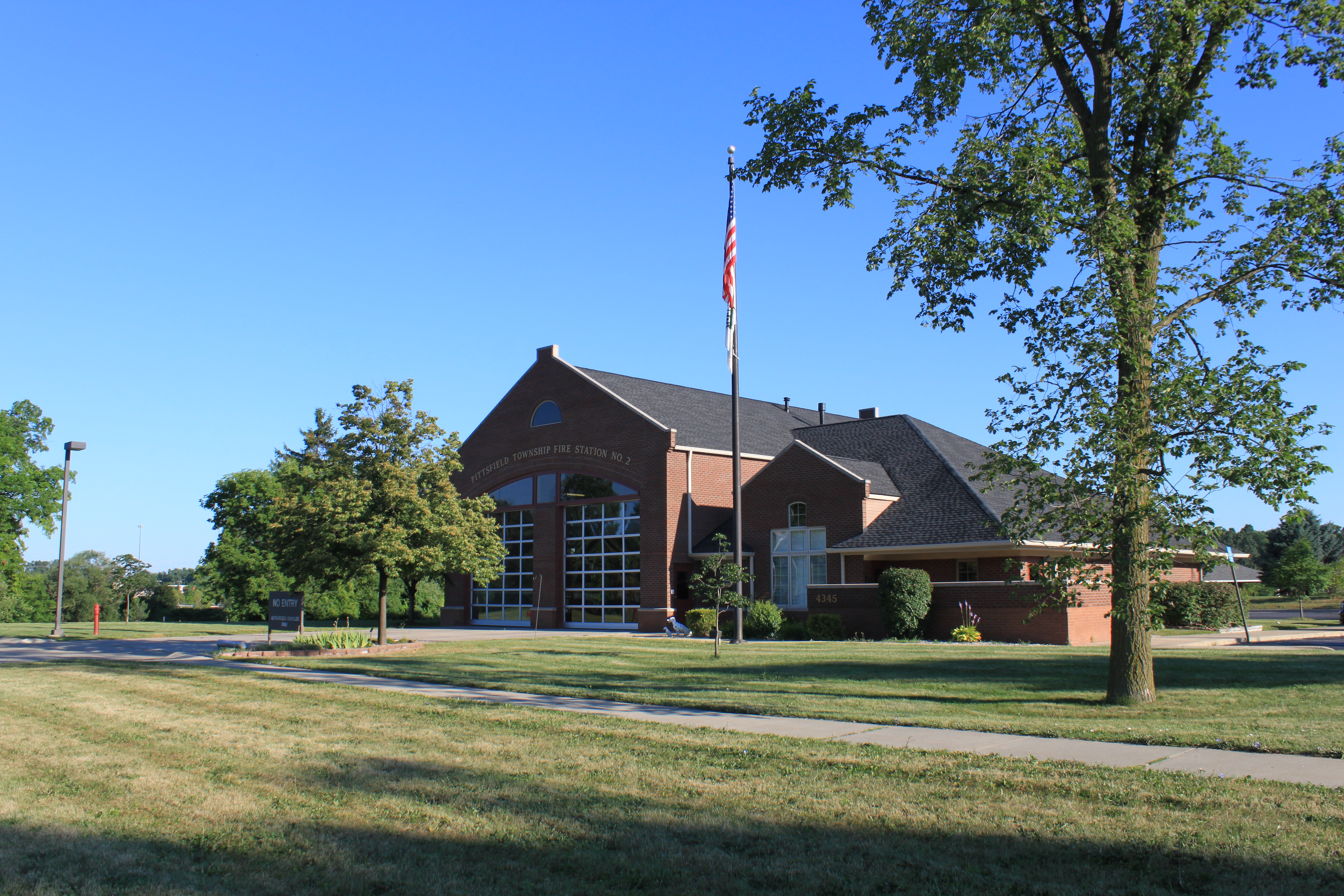
Fire Station Number 2

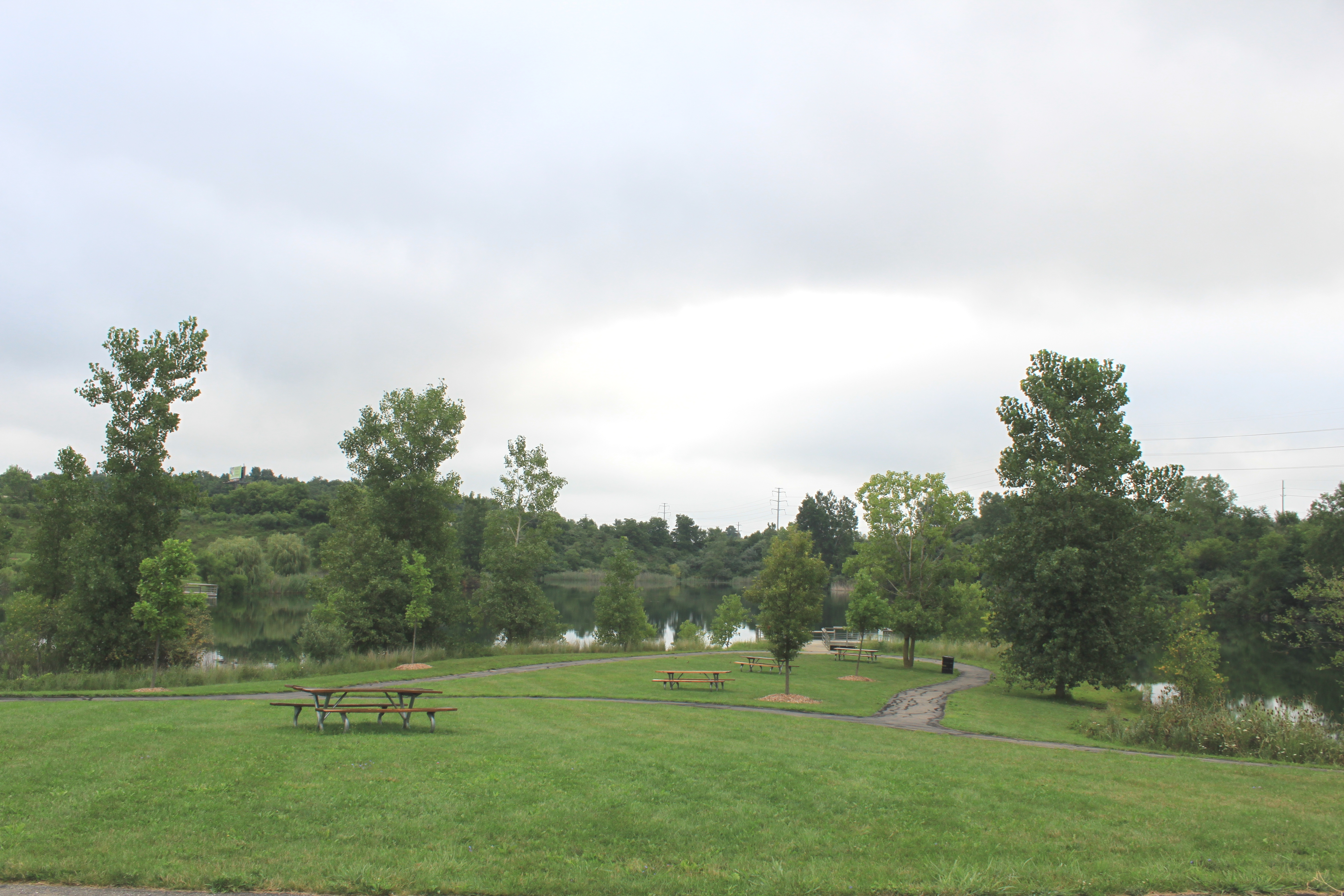
Lillie Park at Haven Lake
