= National Register of Historic Places listings in Ionia County, Michigan =

The following is a list of Registered Historic Places in Ionia County, Michigan.
This National Park Service list is complete through NPS recent listings posted May 15, 2026.

	Name on the Register	Image	Date listed	Location	City or town	Description
1	Alvah N. Belding Memorial Library	Alvah N. Belding Memorial Library	May 21, 1993 (#93000427)	302 E. Main St. 43°05′53″N 85°13′34″W	Belding	
2	John C. Blanchard House	John C. Blanchard House	July 24, 1974 (#74002346)	253 E. Main St. 42°58′58″N 85°03′28″W	Ionia	
3	Hall-Fowler Memorial Library	Hall-Fowler Memorial Library	May 6, 1971 (#71000398)	126 E. Main St. 42°59′01″N 85°03′44″W	Ionia	
4	Ionia County Courthouse	Ionia County Courthouse	August 9, 1979 (#79001155)	E. Main St. 42°59′00″N 85°03′48″W	Ionia	see Claire Allen for more info
5	Ionia Downtown Commercial Historic District	Ionia Downtown Commercial Historic District	September 13, 1984 (#84001437)	Roughly W. Main and Washington Sts., from Dexter to Library Sts. 42°58′57″N 85°04′01″W	Ionia	
6	Ionia Historic District	Ionia Historic District	September 13, 1984 (#84001443)	Roughly bounded by Summit, Pleasant, Jefferson and Main Sts. 42°59′02″N 85°03′39″W	Ionia	
7	Lovell-Webber House	Lovell-Webber House	July 30, 1974 (#74000988)	111 E. Main St. 42°59′01″N 85°03′53″W	Ionia	This House has been demolished.
8	Muir Church of Christ	Muir Church of Christ	February 17, 1983 (#83000852)	138 Garden St. 42°59′59″N 84°56′28″W	Muir	
9	Pere Marquette Railway Belding Depot	Pere Marquette Railway Belding Depot	March 28, 1997 (#97000282)	100 Depot St. 43°05′55″N 85°13′46″W	Belding	
10	Portland Downtown Historic District	Portland Downtown Historic District	May 18, 2005 (#05000153)	Kent and Maple Sts. betw. Grand River Ave. and Academy St. 42°52′09″N 84°54′11″W	Portland	
11	Portland First Congregational Church	Portland First Congregational Church	December 27, 1984 (#84000542)	421 E. Bridge St. 42°52′05″N 84°54′00″W	Portland	The church was severely damaged by a tornado on June 22, 2015 and has been demolished. In 2016 the church completed a rebuilding project that was true to the original style.
12	Portland High School	Portland High School	August 8, 2016 (#16000508)	306 Brush St. 42°51′58″N 84°54′15″W	Portland	
13	Richardson Silk Mill	Richardson Silk Mill	September 26, 1985 (#85002496)	101 Front St. 43°05′55″N 85°14′02″W	Belding	
14	Sessions Schoolhouse	Sessions Schoolhouse	February 11, 1985 (#85000278)	Riverside Dr. 42°57′18″N 85°07′59″W	Ionia	
15	St. John the Baptist Catholic Church Complex	St. John the Baptist Catholic Church Complex	September 24, 2001 (#01001019)	324 S. Washington Ave. 43°05′32″N 84°50′50″W	Hubbardston	
16	William H. VanderHeyden House	William H. VanderHeyden House	December 28, 1990 (#90001959)	926 W. Main St. 42°58′52″N 85°04′46″W	Ionia	

== See also ==
- List of Michigan State Historic Sites in Ionia County, Michigan
- List of National Historic Landmarks in Michigan
- National Register of Historic Places listings in Michigan
- Listings in neighboring counties: Barry, Clinton, Eaton, Gratiot, Kent, Montcalm
