= List of Michigan State Historic Sites in Ionia County =

Location of Ionia County in Michigan

The following is a list of Michigan State Historic Sites in Ionia County, Michigan. Sites marked with a dagger (†) are also listed on the National Register of Historic Places in Ionia County, Michigan.

== Current listings ==
| Name | Image | Location | City | Listing date |
|---|---|---|---|---|
| Alvah N. Belding Memorial Library† | AlvahNBeldingMemorialLibraryBeldingMi | 302 East Main Street | Belding | June 10, 1980 |
| Belding City Hall | Belding City Hall | 120 Pleasant Street | Belding | 2012 |
| Belrockton Dormitory | Belrockton Dormitory | 108 Hanover Street | Belding | May 10, 1990 |
| John C. Blanchard House† | JohnCBlanchardHouseIoniaMi | 253 East Main Street | Ionia | May 17, 1973 |
| L. Phillip and Bertha Brock House | L. Phillip & Bertha Brock House | 409 Union Street | Ionia | January 19, 1989 |
| Winslow P. Burhans House | Winslow P. Burhans House | 220 Rich Street | Ionia | May 17, 1973 |
| Detroit, Lansing and Northern Railway Depot | Detroit, Lansing and Northern Railroad Depot | Emerson Street | Lake Odessa | February 16, 1989 |
| Louis P. Essick House | Louis Essick House Ionia | 644 East Main Street | Ionia | December 17, 1987 |
| First Roadside Table Informational Site | The Roadside Table | Grand River Avenue, east of Morrison Lake Road, near Saranac | Saranac | December 10, 1963 |
| Grand Trunk Western Saranac Depot | Grand Trunk Western Depot | 138 S. Bridge St. | Saranac | August 23, 1990 |
| Fred W. Green Informational Designation | Governor Fred W. Green House | 320 Union Street | Ionia | July 26, 1973 |
| Frederick Hall House† | Hall-Fowler Memorial Library | 126 East Main Street | Ionia | January 22, 1971 |
| Homer-Holbrook Flour and Grist Mill (Burned/Demolished) | | South Washington Street at Fish Creek | Hubbardston | February 19, 1987 |
| Ionia Church of Christ | Ionia Church of Christ | 130 East Washington Street | Ionia | June 15, 1984 |
| Ionia County Courthouse† | IoniaCountyCouthouseIoniaMi | 1000 East Main Street | Ionia | March 2, 1976 |
| Oscar R. Long House | Oscar R. Long House | 144 East Main Street | Ionia | May 17, 1973 |
| Lovell-Webber House† (demolished) | | 111 East Main Street | Ionia | May 17, 1973 |
| Lyons Prairie Site | | SE 18, 07 N, 05 W, confluence of the Maple and Grand rivers | Lyons | July 26, 1973 |
| Muir Church of Christ† | First Christian Church Muir | 138 Garden Street | Muir | May 17, 1973 |
| John C. Olry Farmstead | John C. Olry Farmstead | 3226 East Musgrove Highway | Lake Odessa | February 28, 1986 |
| Orleans Township District No. 10 School | | 8013 N Decker Road | Orleans | June 20, 1991 |
| Pere Marquette Railway Belding Depot† | PereMarquetteRailwayDepotBeldingMi | 100 Depot Street | Belding | April 15, 1999 |
| Portland First Congregational Church† | FirstCongregationalChurchPorldandMI2 | 421 East Bridge Street | Portland | May 17, 1973 |
| Andrew B. Robinson House | Andrew Robinson House Muir | 515 Ionia Street | Muir | May 17, 1973 |
| St. John the Baptist Church / St. John the Baptist Cemetery† | St John the Baptist Church Hubbardston | 324 South Washington Street | Hubbardston | January 18, 2001 |
| Saint John's Episcopal Church and Parish House | St, Johns Episcopal Church - Ionia | 107 West Washington Street, at Kidd Street | Ionia | April 24, 1981 |
| Village of Saranac Informational Site | Saranac sign | Entrance to Scheid Park, Main Street, between Fuller Street and Jackson Road | Saranac | June 27, 1969 |
| Sessions Schoolhouse† | Sessions Schoolhouse Ionia | Riverside Drive at Jordan Lake Road | Ionia vicinity | May 17, 1973 |
| Edward Stevenson General Store | Edward Stevenson General Store | 351 West Main Street | Ionia | May 17, 1973 |
| Isaac H. Thayer House | Issac H. Thayer House | 116 East High Street | Ionia | May 17, 1973 |
| William H. VanderHeyden House† | WilliamHVanderHeydenHouseIoniaMi | 926 West Main Street | Ionia | May 17, 1973 |
| Village of Smyrna Informational Site | Smyrna MI sign | 4972 Whites Bridge Road | Smyrna | January 27, 1983 |
| Benjamin C. and Lucia Vosper House | Benjamin & Lucia Vosper House | 267 East Main Street | Ionia | September 23, 1993 |
| Samuel Webber House | Samuel Webber House Lyons | 644 East Bridge Street | Lyons | September 21, 1976 |
| Weippert Mill | | Northwest corner of Keefer Highway and Bippley Road | Sebewa | August 3, 1979 |
| White's Covered Bridge (Destroyed by arson July 7, 2013) | | Whitesbridge Road over the Flat River, south of 4 Mile Road | Keene Township | February 17, 1965 |
| Women's Suffrage Amendment of 1918 Commemorative Designation | | 252 Kent Street | Portland | September 16, 1986 |

== See also ==
- National Register of Historic Places listings in Ionia County, Michigan

== Sources ==
- Historic Sites Online – Ionia County. Michigan State Housing Developmental Authority. Accessed February 10, 2011.
