= Ionia Historic District =

- U.S. National Register of Historic Places
- U.S. Historic district
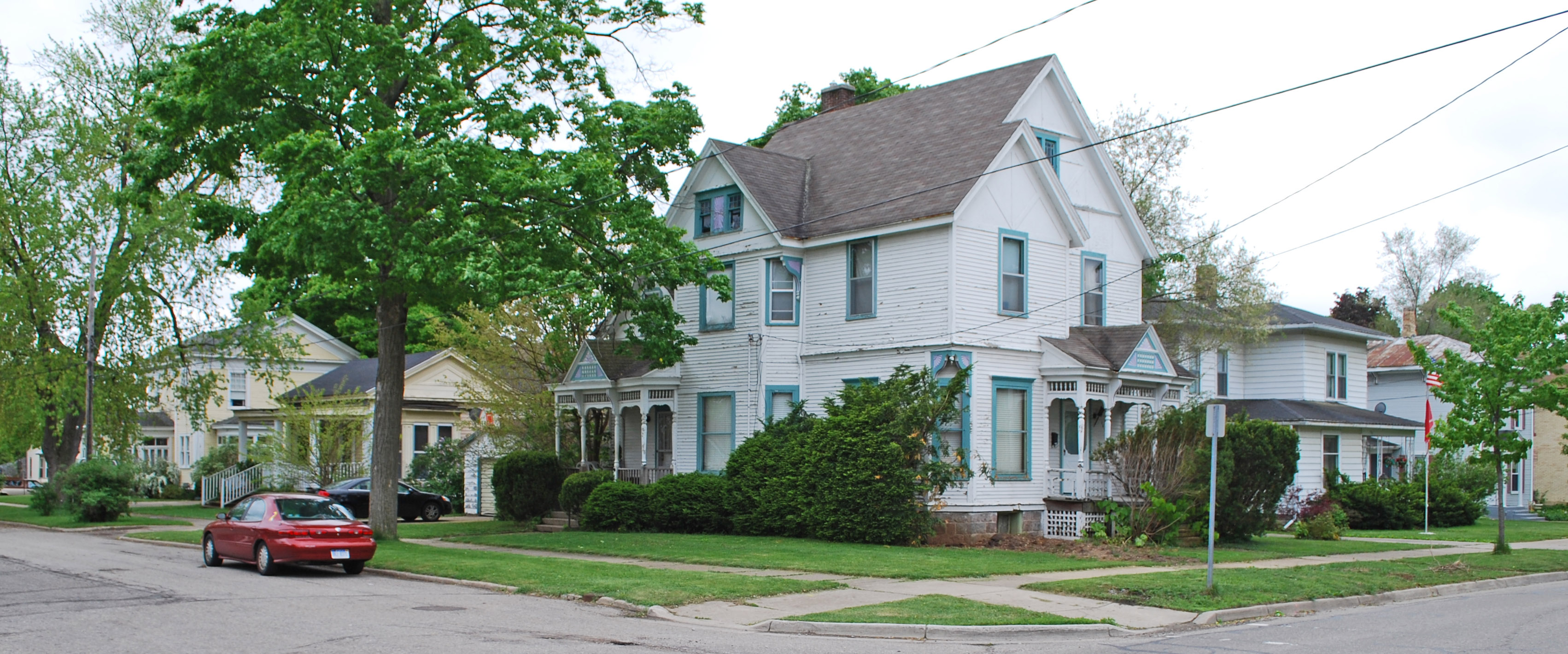
- Corner of Washington and Rich

- Location within Michigan Location within the United States
- Interactive map
- Location: Roughly bounded by Summit, Pleasant, Jefferson and Main Sts., Ionia, Michigan
- Coordinates: 42°59′2″N 85°3′39″W
- Area: 59 acres (24 ha)
- Architect: Multiple
- Architectural style: Colonial Revival, Greek Revival, Late Victorian
- NRHP reference No.: 84001443
- Added to NRHP: September 13, 1984

The Ionia Historic District is a primarily residential historic district in Ionia, Michigan, roughly bounded by Summit, Pleasant, Jefferson and Main Streets. It was listed on the National Register of Historic Places in 1984.

== History ==
Ionia was first settled in 1833 by Samuel Dexter, who recruited a group of about 63 people from New York to join him. Aided by the local Ojibwe, they settled in and cleared fields, then built log cabins and soon a sawmill. What is now the Ionia Historic District was at first just a scattering of small houses. In 1839 the United States Land Office was transferred to Ionia, and in 1859 the railroad came through the town. Along with other commercial enterprises, these made Ionia a prosperous settlement, and the rapid growth led to prominent members of the community constructing homes in the district just east of the downtown. Among the most significant residents who established homes in the district are John C. Blanchard, the first president of the village of Ionia, Frederick Hall, Ionia's first mayor in 1873, George W. Webber, an Ionia entrepreneur and lumberman, Captain Lucius Mills, a local contractor, and Fred W. Green, two-term Governor of Michigan. Three of these houses - the John C. Blanchard House, the Frederick Hall House (now the Hall-Fowler Memorial Library), and the Lovell-Webber House are individually listed on the National Register.

Although some of the early structures in the district are of the mid-nineteenth century Greek Revival style, the most characteristic type is the later Italianate variety, which predominates in the neighborhood, showing the bulk of the district was built up in the later nineteenth century. Later twentieth century structures are also in the neighborhood, but tend to be more modest in scale than the earlier houses.

== Description ==
The Ionia Historic District is located to the east of downtown Ionia. It contains 197 structures, of which 188 contribute to the historical nature of the neighborhood. All but seven of these were built as residential structure; the remaining are churches or commercial buildings. The houses are substantially Italianate in design, although some examples of Greek Revival, Eastlake, Queen Anne, Colonial Revival, and bungalow architectures are also in the neighborhood. The streets are narrow and the houses well set back, giving the neighborhood a spacious feel.

== Gallery ==
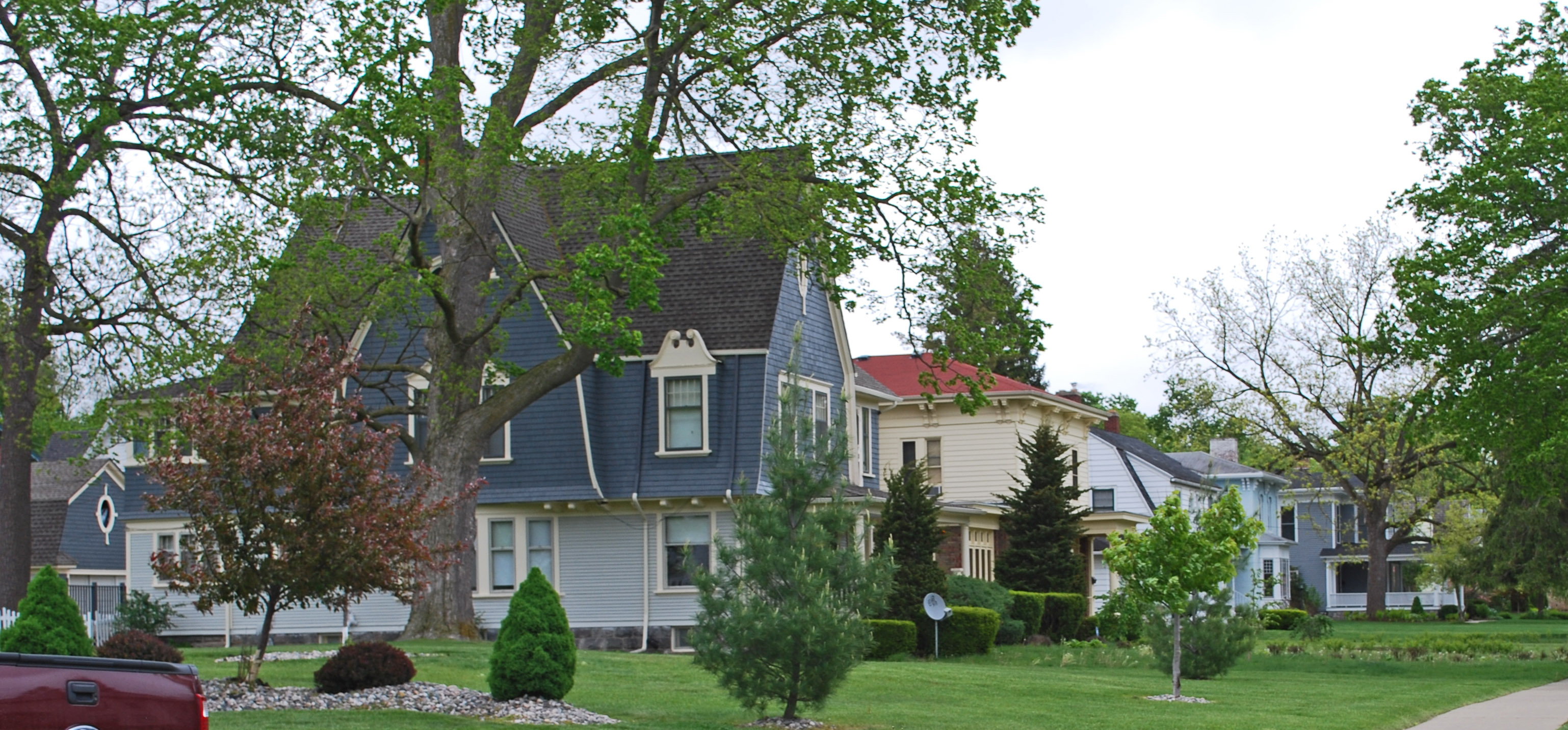

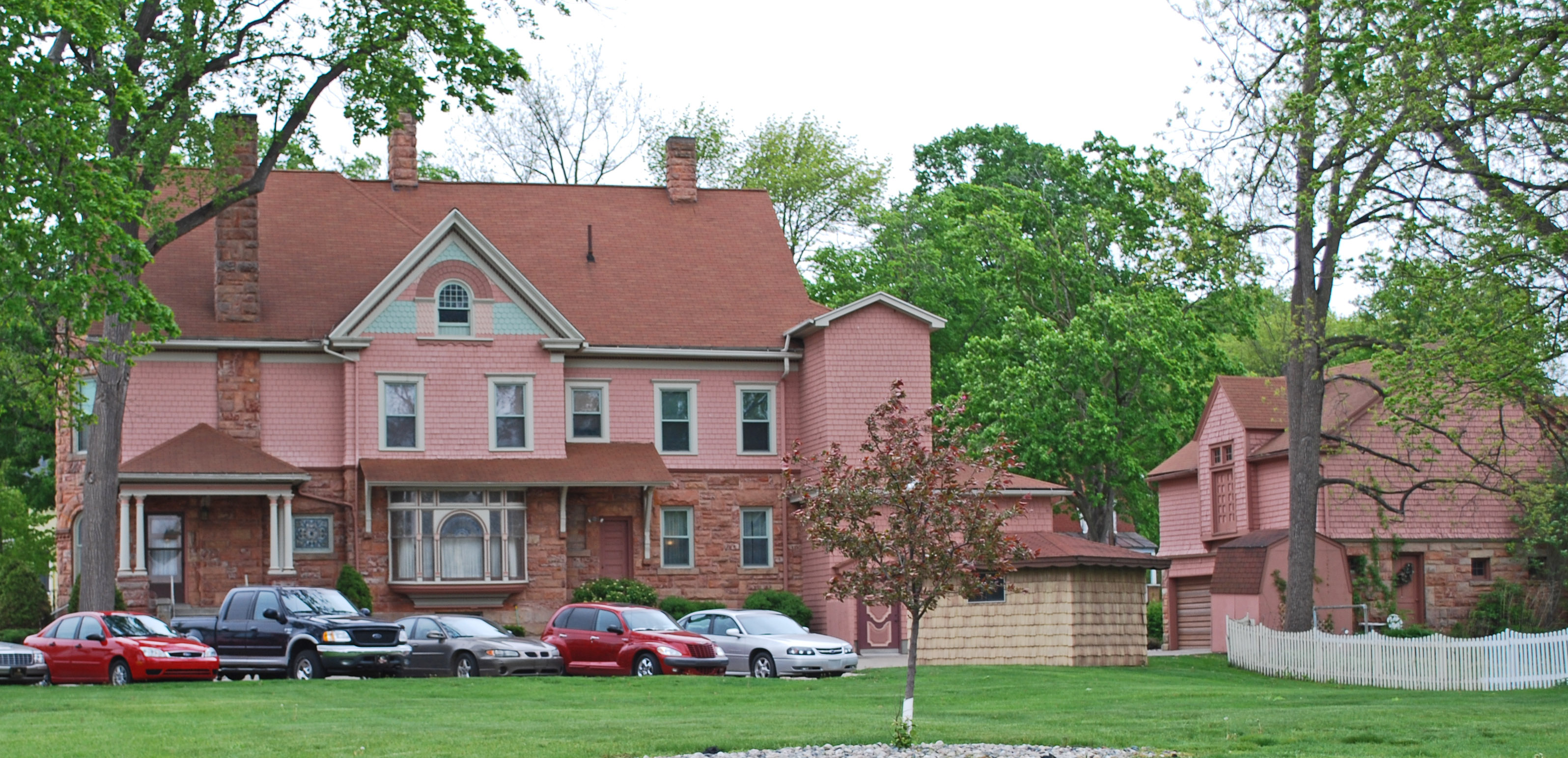

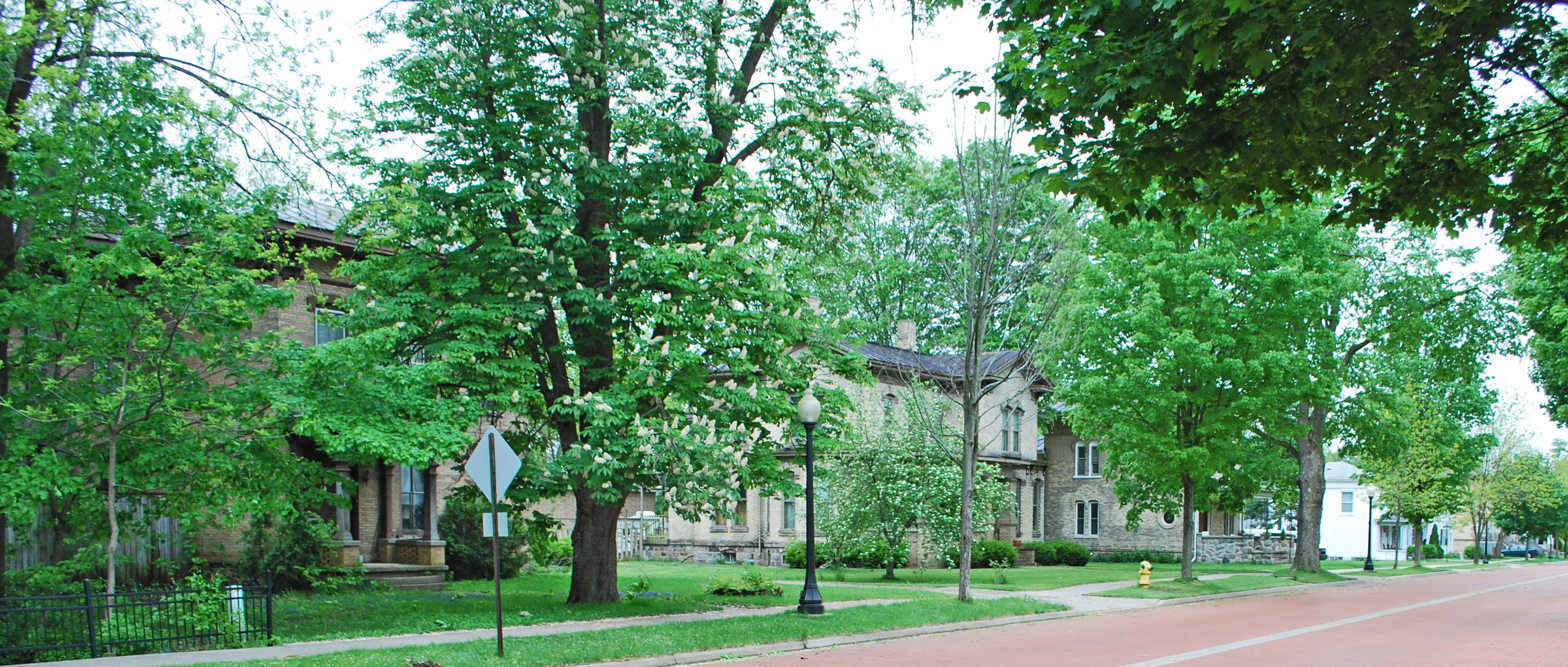
