= Ionia Township =

Ionia Township may refer to the following townships in the United States:

- Ionia Township, Michigan
- Ionia Township, Jewell County, Kansas
