= Ionia Downtown Commercial Historic District =

- U.S. National Register of Historic Places
- U.S. Historic district
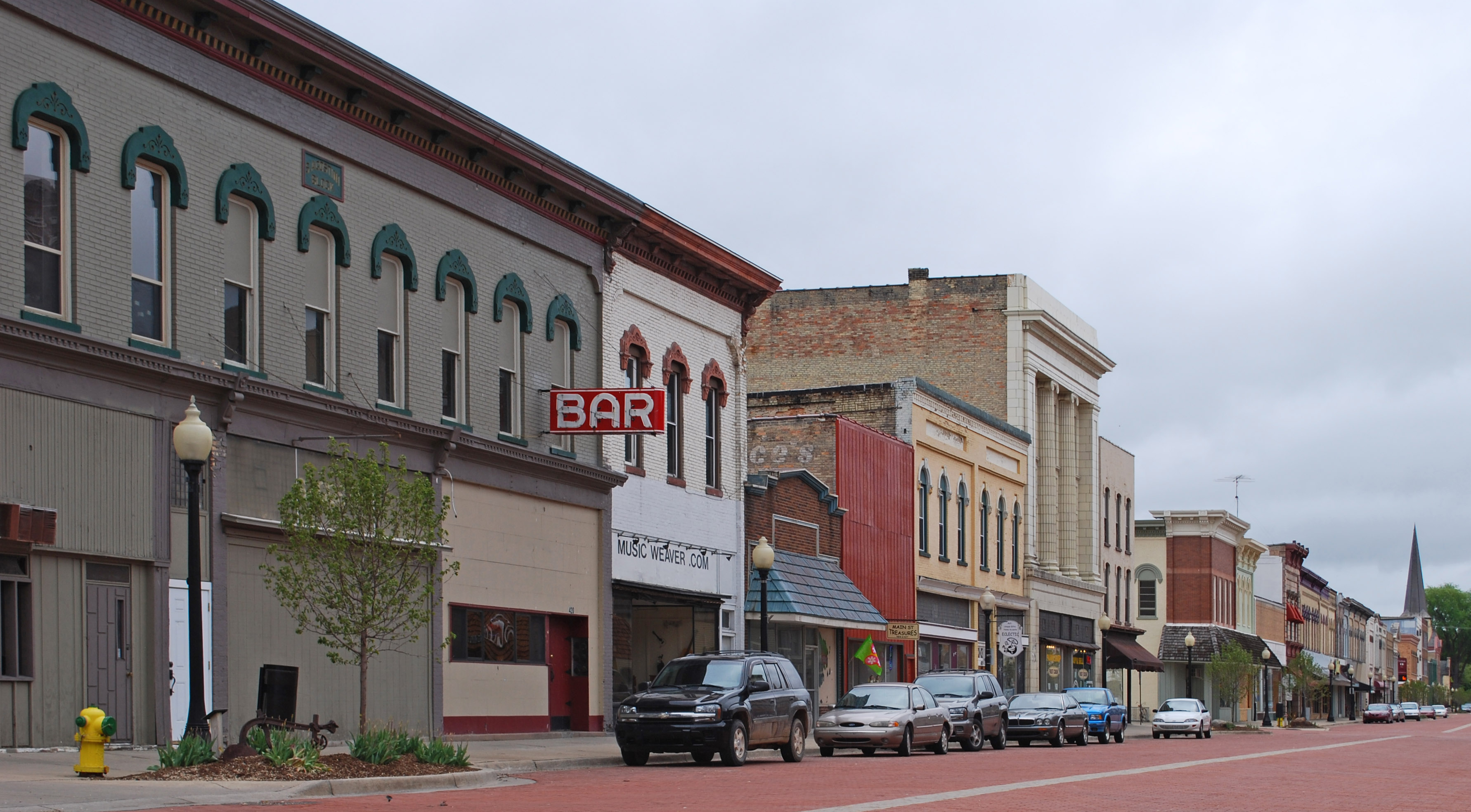
- West Main between Steele and Dexter, looking east

- Location within Michigan Location within the United States
- Interactive map
- Location: Roughly W. Main and Washington Sts., from Dexter to Library Sts., Ionia, Michigan
- Coordinates: 42°58′57″N 85°4′1″W
- Area: 18 acres (7.3 ha)
- Architect: Multiple
- Architectural style: Late 19th And 20th Century Revivals, Italianate, Moderne
- NRHP reference No.: 84001437
- Added to NRHP: September 13, 1984

The Ionia Downtown Commercial Historic District is a primarily commercial district located roughly along West Main and Washington Streets, from Dexter Street to Library Street, in Ionia, Michigan. The district was listed on the National Register of Historic Places in 1984.

== History ==
Ionia was first settled in 1833 by Samuel Dexter, who recruited a group of about 63 people from New York to join him. Aided by the local Ojibwe, they settled in and cleared fields, then built log cabins and soon a sawmill. Other commercial activities soon followed, with a furniture factory and brewery active by the late 1830s. In 1835/36, Ionia became the official county seat, and the federal land office was established in the area in 1836. These led to the opening of hotels and stores in the growing community. The village itself was first platted in 1841, including what is now this commercial district on the northern side. The oldest structure in the district - the St. John's parish house - dates to this time period.

The railroad reached Ionia in 1859, hastening commercial activity. This included an increased demand for Ionia sandstone, and by the 1870s there were eight hotels in the city, serving travelers arriving by railroad. Much of the building stock in the district was built starting around this time, as Ionia grew in the late nineteenth century.

== Description ==
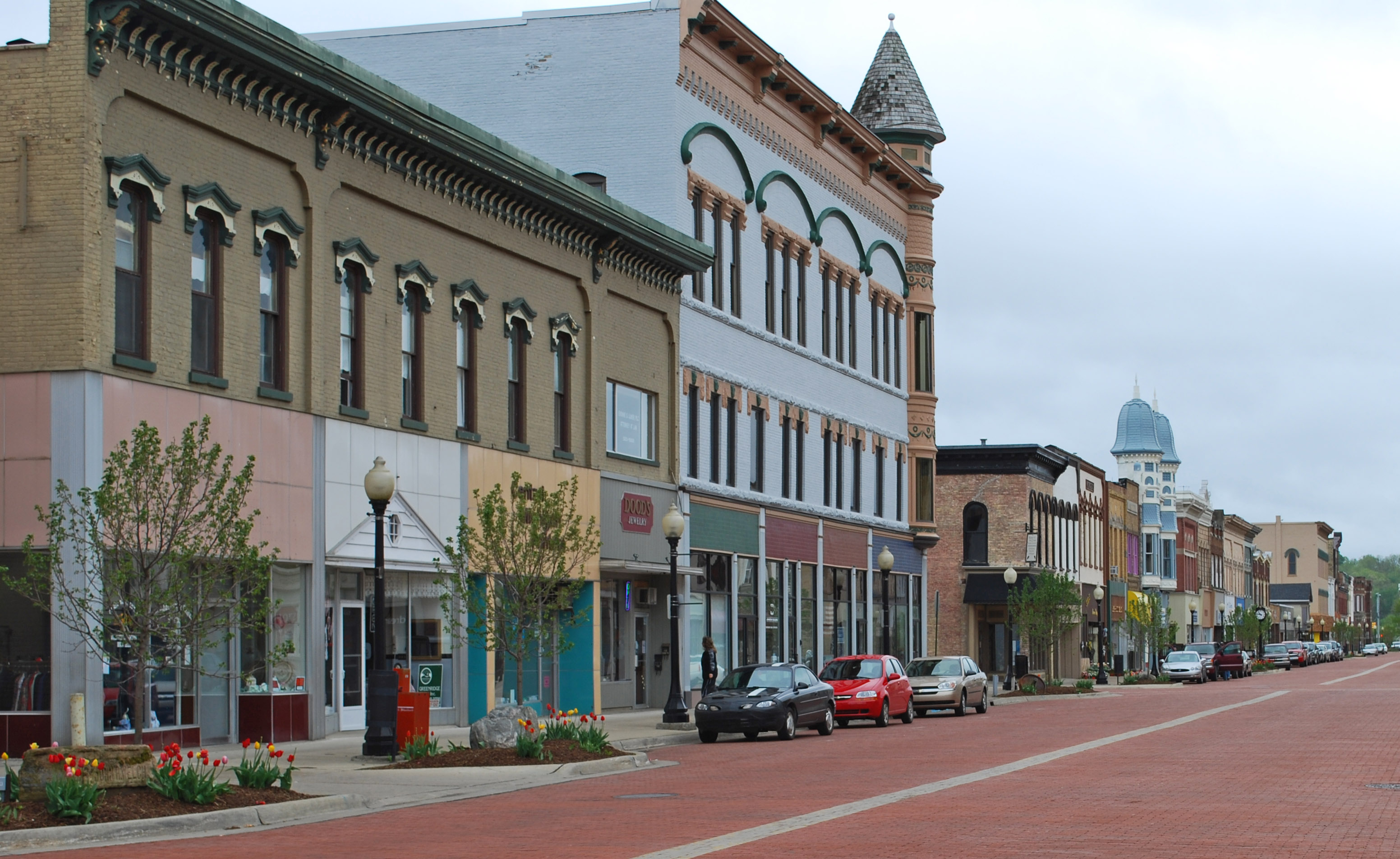
West Main between Kidd and Depot, looking west

The Ionia Downtown Commercial Historic District covers nearly all of Ionia's central business district, and includes buildings which were constructed primarily in the late nineteenth and early twentieth centuries. Eighty-five structures are included in the district, of which seventy contribute to the historic nature of the district. These buildings are primarily commercial, although the district does include some residential, religious, and governmental buildings. The commercial blocks stand side-by-side, directly on the sidewalk line, and are generally two- or three-story structures, constructed of red brick or the locally quarried sandstone.

The east end of the district is an institutional area, containing the county courthouse, city hall, post office, and multiple church buildings. All of these are architecturally significant, and contribute to the historic nature of the district. The most significant structures in the district include:

- The Ionia Armory (439 W. Main), is a two-story red brick structure built in 1908-09. It is built in a picturesque, crenellated English Gothic style, with an arched corbel table at the cornice level and a corbelled turret window located at the corner of the building. The original upper portion of the tower has been removed.
- The three commercial buildings at 409, 411, and 413 West Main Street are all Italianate structures constructed in the late 1880s or early 1890s. Although each is of an individual design, they all retain much of their original cast-iron storefronts.
- The commercial building at 340 West Main Street is a two-story structure constructed in about 1890. It is notable for its handsome facade of pink Ionia sandstone.
- The Italianate commercial block at 332-336 West Main Street was constructed in about 1885, and is a two-story, three-storefront block with a buff brick facade, metal cornice, and ornate metal window heads.
- The Silver-Graff Building (313-317 W. Main) was constructed in 1894. It is a two-story, two storefront building with a rock-face, random ashlar facade. Two second-story bay windows located at either end of the facade rise into octagonal towers with distinctive bell-shaped roofs. The bay windows, towers, cornices, and parapets are all of metal.
- The Ionia County National Bank Building (302 W. Main) is a two-story NeoClassical structure builtin 1914, with a temple front having two-story limestone columns in a full pediment and entablature.
- St. John's Episcopal Church (120 N. Kidd) is an 1882 Victorian Gothic structure, with a square plan tower and unusual Victorian styling.
- The Ionia County Courthouse (100 W. Main), individually listed in the National Register, is an 1885 building constructed of Ionia sandstone.
