= Sessions Schoolhouse =

- U.S. National Register of Historic Places
- Michigan State Historic Site
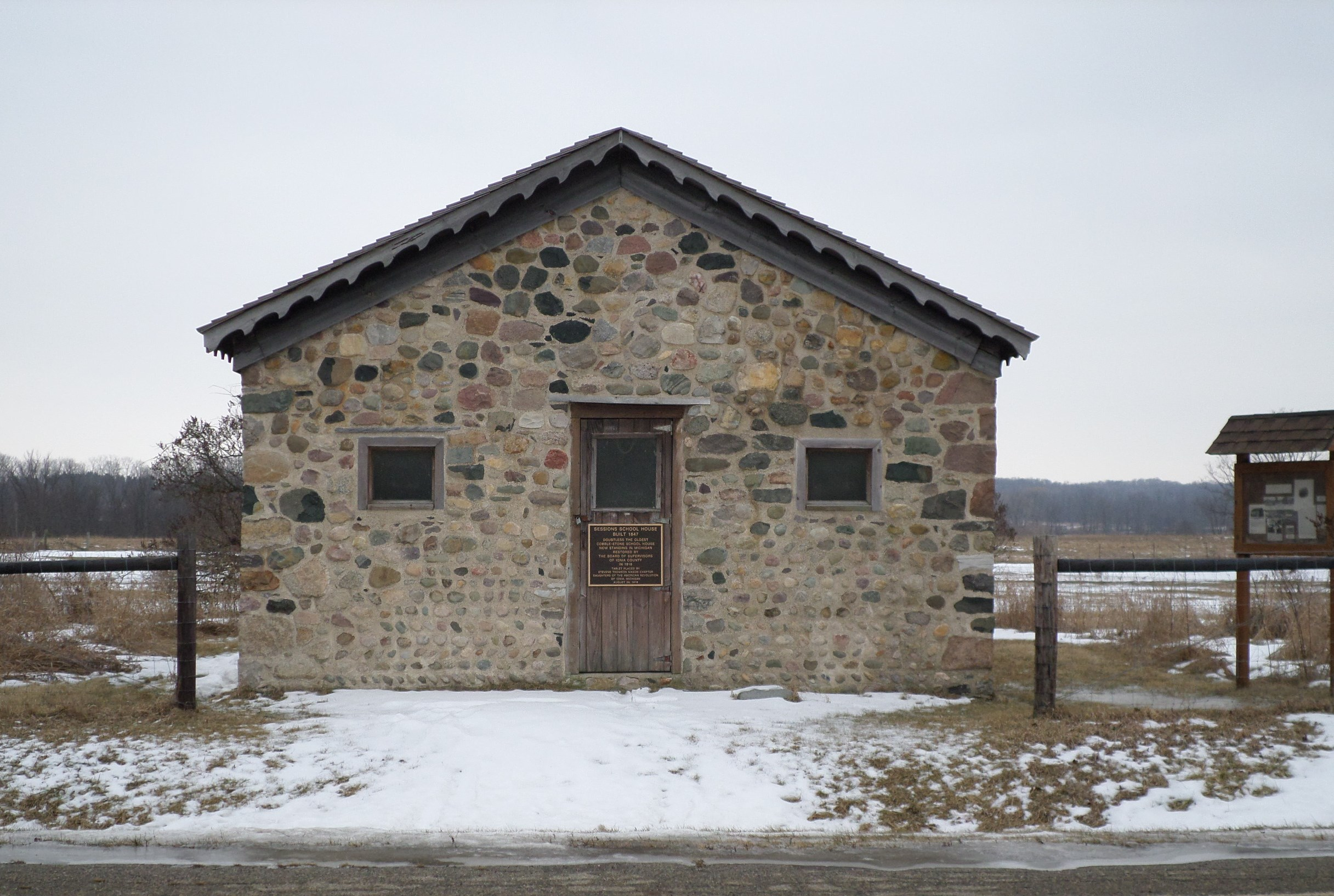
- The schoolhouse in January 2015

- Location within Michigan Location within the United States
- Interactive map
- Nearest city: Ionia, Michigan
- Coordinates: 42°57′19.1″N 85°7′58.5″W
- Area: less than one acre
- Built: 1847
- NRHP reference No.: 85000278
- Added to NRHP: February 11, 1985

Sessions Schoolhouse is a historic one-room school in Ionia, Michigan. It was built in 1847 and added to the National Register of Historic Places in 1985. According to the Michigan Department of Natural Resources, it is believed to be the oldest existing schoolhouse in Michigan. The schoolhouse is now part of the Ionia State Recreation Area. As part of the State Park Explorer Program, there is historic interpretation of the Sessions Schoolhouse provided through interpretive signage as well as through programming by an Explorer Ranger.

== History ==
Alonzo Sessions was born in New York in 1810, worked as a teacher for some time in New York, and moved to Ionia County in 1835. He cleared 360 acres for farming, later adding additional acreage to bring his farm up to 800 acres total. He married Celia Dexter, daughter of Samuel Dexter, the founder of Ionia. Sessions was elected to the Michigan House of Representatives in 1872, and served twice as the Lieutenant Governor of Michigan, in 1876 and 1880.

Sessions had a personal interest in education from his experience as a teacher. In 1847, he built this schoolhouse on his farm. It was used as a schoolhouse until 1898, when a larger schoolhouse was erected across the road. After this, the 1847 schoolhouse was used as a "pest house" for a time. The building was restored in 1918, at which time the local chapter of the Daughters of the American Revolution placed a bronze plaque on the structure. However, it remained unused until 1958, when it was again repaired.

== Description ==
The Sessions schoolhouse is a one-room, rectangular cobblestone and rubble structure with a low-pitched, wood shingle, gable roof with slightly projecting eaves. It measures 20 feet by 24 feet. The front has a central entry door flanked by two small windows. Two larger windows are on each side.
