= Ionia State Recreation Area =

Recreation area in Ionia County, Michigan

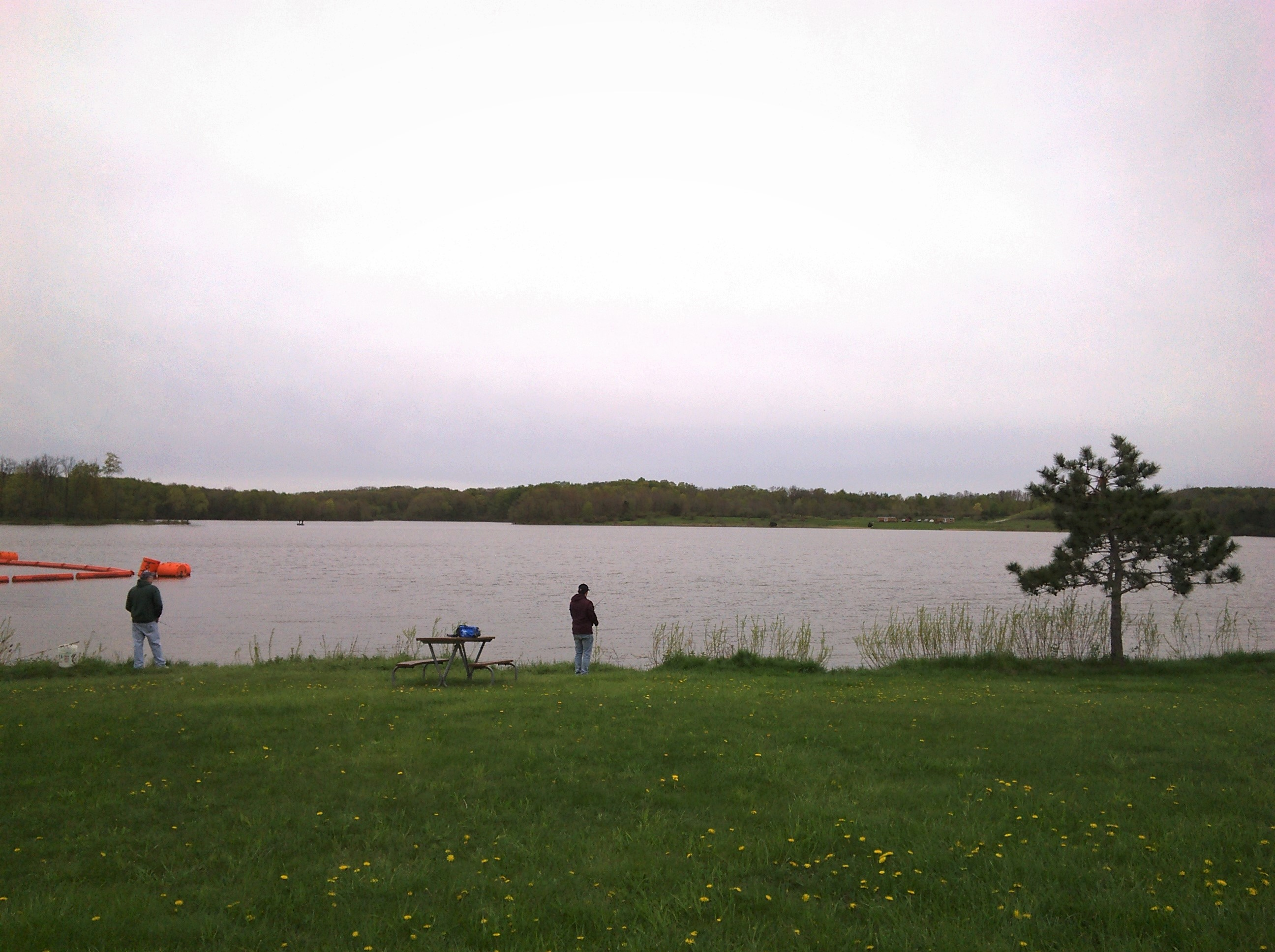

- Location within Michigan Location within the United States
- Location: Ionia County, Michigan, USA
- Nearest city: Ionia, Michigan
- Coordinates: 42°56′46″N 85°08′03″W
- Area: 4,500 acres (1,821 ha)
- Governing body: Michigan Department of Natural Resources
- Website: Official website

Ionia State Recreation Area is a 4,500-acre (1,800 ha) recreation area, located in Ionia County, Michigan.

== Facilities ==
- Beach House
- Boat Launch (Sessions lake and walk-in Grand River access)
- Campground - 100 Modern Sites, 49 Equestrian (rustic) Sites, 2 mini-Cabins
- Disc golfing (24 holes)
- Dog Trial Areas
- Picnic Areas (Beachwood, Beach, Point, Riverside)
- Picnic Shelters(Beachwood, Riverside, and Beach building) - Reservation optional

== Activities ==
- Boat Rentals
- Camping
- Canoeing (boat rentals available)
- Cross Country Skiing - 10.5 miles (16.9 km)
- Fishing
- Hiking - 3.5 miles (5.6 km)
- Horseback Riding - 15 miles (24 km)
- Hunting
- Metal Detecting
- Mountain Biking - 9 miles (14 km)
- Swimming
