= Ionia Free Fair =

Michigan county fair

The Ionia Free Fair (IFF) is what is said to be the world's largest free-admission fair, hosted annually in July. The Fair was established in 1915 and takes place in Ionia, Michigan at the fairgrounds near the city center. It brings in hundreds of thousands of attendees annually, with an estimated 400,000 guests in 2023.

== History ==
The Fair was established by Governor Fred Green – a former Ionia mayor – as well as his partner Fred Chapman in 1915. The fair started as a way to offer something different and spectacular to people nearby, with the notable feature of free admission that still exists to this day. Originally intended to only last a few days, it has turned into a week-and-a-half's worth of festivities.

World War I caused its cancellation in 1917-18.

The Fair celebrated its centennial in 2015. Nowadays, it is billed as the "ten best days of summer" and still boasts one of the largest midways in Michigan.

=== Delays and cancellations ===
Weather conditions like extreme rain or heat will occasionally impair the Fair. In these cases, the Fair will start late or end early. In 2011, the Fair ended several days early for the first time ever due to flooding. There have only been two instances of the Fair closing down for the entire duration of "Fair week".

During World War II, the IFF was cancelled.

In May 2020, IFF organizers canceled the upcoming 105th event due to the COVID-19 pandemic. This marked the first Fair cancellation since World War II. In its place, there was a two-day drive-up food sale that July featuring Italian sausages, lemonade, and elephant ears, a decision that complied with social distancing guidelines. This drive-up model echoed a similar event held over Mother's Day weekend just months prior, where more than 1,200 cars drove through to purchase food. The Fair returned the following year, in July 2021.

=== Notable attendees ===
In addition to the well-known entertainers that have come to the IFF to perform, many other celebrities and politicians have spent time at the event. Governor Gretchen Whitmer, Former Governor Rick Snyder, and Former State Representative and Michigan Second Lady Julie Calley and her husband Former Lieutenant Governor Brian Calley have notably attended the event.

== Attractions and entertainment ==
=== Shows ===
==== Musical acts ====
The Fair has been known for hosting a variety of musical performances ranging from big-name acts to local cover bands. While the line-up changes year to year, there is usually an '80s-themed band, talent show and/or singing competition, and rock cover bands.

They have also hosted a number of internationally-recognized musicians and performers over the years. Several acts – including the Beach Boys, REO Speedwagon, Blue Oyster Cult, Def Leppard, Styx, Deep Purple, and Loretta Lynn – have performed at the event multiple times. Footage from the Ionia Free Fair appears in the 1987 music video for Eddie Money's "We Should Be Sleeping".

Notable IFF Acts
Year:	Performer:
1968	Hank Williams Jr. and the Detroit Wheels
1973	Loretta Lynn and Doc Severinsen
1979	Shaun Cassidy
1981	Kool and the Gang
1982	Rick Springfield
1983	The Little River Band, Cheap Trick, Mitch Ryder, Blue Oyster Cult
1984	The Romantics
1985	The Beach Boys, Loretta Lynn, Conway Twitty, Night Ranger
1986	Stevie Ray Vaughan, Willie Nelson, Ted Nugent, The Nitty Gritty Dirt Band
1987	The Monkees, Weird Al Yankovic, Night Ranger, REO Speedwagon, Richard Marx, Eddie Money
1988	Def Leppard, Europe, The Beach Boys, David Lee Roth, Poison
1991	Winger
1994	Metallica, Danzig, Suicidal Tendencies
1995	Deep Purple
1996	Foreigner, Peter Frampton, REO Speedwagon, The Beach Boys
1999	REO Speedwagon, Styx
2000	Def Leppard, LFO, TLC
2001	Vince Neil, Stephen Pearcy, Slaughter, Vixen
2004	Rascal Flatts, The Beach Boys
2005	Deep Purple, Kenny Wayne Shepherd, Blue Oyster Cult, ZZ Top, Mat Kearney, Tim McGraw
2006	Styx
2023	Lee Brice

==== Ionia Idol ====
After the popularity of American Idol, a singing competition called Ionia Idol started to take place over the course of the Fair, as early as 2005. A panel of judges scores finalists on their stage presence, talent, vocal range, and overall impression; then, scores are tallied and winners are announced. The competition has had winners from across the state and usually involves a cash prize, with first place landing around $1,500. Past winners include Maverick Musser of Saranac, Shaena Poehner of Flint, MaRynn Taylor of Rockford, and Ionians Caitlin Cusack and Savanna Curtis.

==== Animal performances ====
For many years, the Fair has brought animals to perform for the crowds. This has included the Sea Lion Splash, banana derbies (monkeys riding dogs), pig racing, Goat Island, and full circuses.

=== Food ===
There are dozens of food and beverage booths at the Fair, which have traditionally included root beer, sausages, fries, popcorn, corn dogs, gyros, lemonade, elephant ears, cotton candy, taffy, deep-fried candy bars, and other carnival food staples. In recent years, new items like elote have been offered. Alcohol is offered in limited areas.

=== Rides ===
The Fair's ride offerings fluctuate year by year.

Several different companies have provided rides to the Fair over the years. The Deggler family's midway attractions appeared at the Fair from 1965 to 1978. As of 2023, Arnold Amusements has been the provider of rides at the Fair for several years. The company is best known for providing the rides used at the 2021 Traverse City Cherry Festival, where a ride malfunction made national headlines.

=== Exhibits ===
==== 4-H and the Miracle of Life exhibit ====
There are multiple on-site barns that feature an array of animals, including horses, cows, goats, and chickens, as well as various craft projects done by 4-H members.

The Miracle of Life exhibit – inspired by the Michigan State Fair exhibit of the same name – became an annual tradition in 2014. This interactive exhibit features animals and plants and often includes animals giving birth live or on video as a learning opportunity for fairgoers.

==== Merchants Building ====
Vendors – primarily retail – reside in the indoor marketplace known as the Merchants Building.

==== Antique Village ====
The Antique Village portion of the Fair includes history-focused displays, crafters and artisans, and live music.

=== Parade ===
On the first Saturday of the Free Fair, there is a parade held downtown to celebrate the events. According to differing accounts, this parade tradition either dates back all the way to the fair's inaugural year or 1949.

=== Fair Queen contest ===
Since 1949, choosing an Ionia Free Fair Queen has been an annual tradition. As of the 2020s, the process to be crowned as Ionia Free Fair Queen includes an application (with headshot), an introductory breakfast, a group interview, a solo interview, and a pageant where contestants will give a speech, answer questions, and be judged.

For several years in the 1940s–1950s, the Ionia Free Fair Queen won a three-day trip to Chicago.

In 2023, judges named Lilly Reams as the Ionia Free Fair Queen, with Caitlin McGuire and Ava Perry being named as 1st Runner-up and 2nd Runner-up, respectively. The year prior, 2022, saw Brooke Smith become Queen with Paige Campbell and Ella Boucher making up the rest of the court.

In 2024, Becca Hopkins was named the Ionia Free Fair Queen, Addy Roundtree as 1st Runner Up, with Hailey Miller as 2nd Runner Up.

=== Machinery ===
The fair boasts a variety of demolition derbies, tractor pulls, off road derbies, monster truck throw-downs, motocross races, and other machine-focused exhibitions, most of which take place in the Grandstand.

=== Specialty days ===
==== Governor's Day ====
The Fair hosts a traditional Governor's Day luncheon, a tradition dating back to 1927.

==== Cops Day ====
Since 1988 or 1989, the Fair has been hosting an annual Cops Day celebrating corrections officers, police department employees, fire department employees, sheriff department employees, court employees, active or retired military members, and public safety employees. Many years, these days include free or discounted snacks, ride wristbands, and merchandise for these employees, as well as their families.

==== Kids Day ====
Kids Day is a day focused on making the Fair a welcoming place for children, and usually includes additional activities focused on the younger demographic. This tradition dates back to 1932.

==== Senior and Wellness Day ====
The Fair hosts an annual day for seniors, with bingo, music, wellness vendors, and a luncheon. This tradition dates back to 2004.

=== Camping ===
The fairgrounds have a designated space for fairgoers to park their vehicles and camp for some, or all, of the Fair's duration.

=== Carnival games ===
The IFF features a number of carnival games like coin drops, balloon darts, and water gun shooters. These games often come with prizes, traditionally ranging from stuffed animals all the way to live fish.

=== Mascots ===
The Fair's original mascot, BIFFY, dates back to 1966. His name is an acronym for "Best Ionia Free Fair Yet".

Early into the 21st century, Kelsey the Cow was made the new mascot of the IFF.

== Off-season use and local impact ==
Throughout the year, the fairgrounds are used for other events, including the world's largest food truck rally, car shows, concerts, and yard sales. Private events are also held here, and the fairgrounds – particularly, the Floral Building – are a popular venue for weddings. Camping is also allowed outside of the fair, from May through October.

The fairgrounds gained some notoriety in 2009 when over 1,000 cars were totaled in a flood there at the B-93 Birthday Bash country music concert. It took over a week before the vehicles – over 1,400 of them – could begin to be removed.

The influx of tourists that come in for the Fair affects the local economy, with hotels, gas stations, restaurants, grocery stores, and campgrounds in the area all benefiting directly. Sales for entities like furniture, farm equipment, real estate, vehicles, and more also benefit from the increased commerce.
