= Portland School Apartments =

- Portland High School
- U.S. National Register of Historic Places
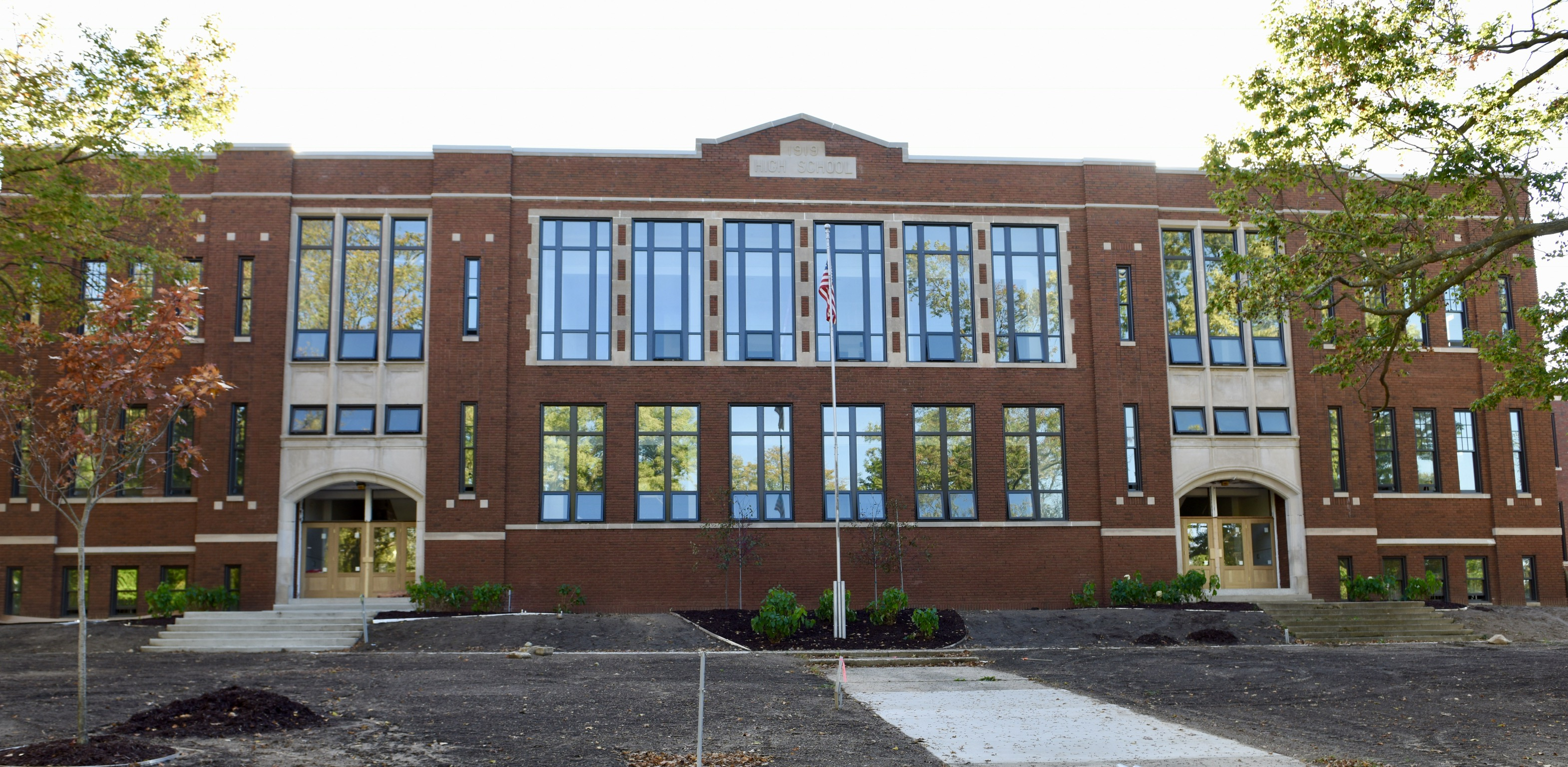

- Location within Michigan Location within the United States
- Interactive map
- Location: 306 Brush St., Portland, Michigan
- Coordinates: 42°51′58″N 84°54′15″W
- Area: less than one acre
- Built: 1919
- Built by: Charles Hoertz & Son
- Architect: Thomas E. White, Warren S. Holmes Co.
- Architectural style: Collegiate Gothic
- NRHP reference No.: 16000508
- Added to NRHP: August 8, 2016

Portland High School is a former public high school located at 306 Brush Street in Portland, Michigan. It was added to the National Register of Historic Places in 2016. The building has been converted into apartments, known as the Portland School Apartments.

== History ==
Portland was first settled around 1833, and the first schoolhouse built in the area was in 1842. This building was replaced in 1860 with a new two-story structure. Soon, Portland entered a boom time, and a second school was added in 1870, located on the property where this High School is now located. A third school was added in 1873. In 1881, the district constructed their first high school, again located near the site of this building. The 1881 high school was expanded in 1903, but was completely destroyed by fire in 1918.

The school board immediately began the process of replacing the high school, hiring architect Thomas E. White of Lansing to design a new school. In 1919 they hired Charles Hoertz & Son as contractor, and construction started on the new building, located on the same lot as the previous high school. The new Portland High School was completed in 1920 for a cost of $110,000. At the time, the school served the entire student body of the district, from kindergarten to high school.

By 1935, the building was full, and the school board hired Lansing architects Warren S. Holmes Company to design an addition. The addition was constructed with help from the Works Progress Administration, and finished in 1936. By 1953, the school was again overcrowded, and an elementary school was constructed to relieve some of the pressure. A second elementary school was constructed a few years later, but the High School was still housing a substantial number of elementary students. In 1962/63, a new high school was constructed, and the 1919 High School was renovated to house a Junior High School, along with some grades of elementary school.

In 1991, another hew high school was constructed, and the 1962 high school renovated into a middle school, and the 1919 High School was sold. In 1992 the building was converted into twenty-nine apartments. However, in the mid-2000s, the owners ceased maintenance, and in 2008 the building was condemned and foreclosed. In 2013, plans were made to renovate the building. Work on renovations began in 2016, and the building has been converted into the Portland School Apartments.

== Description ==
The Old School manor is a 2-1/2 story building of red brick, with limestone accent bands. The main building has corridors in the shape of a C, with the auditorium in the center. A 1936 addition on one corner is a three-story red brick building with an L-shaped corridor plan.

The main facade is symmetrical with a gymnasium and auditorium section in the center, flanked by two entrance bays. Classroom sections are on each end. Each section is flanked with shallow brick piers. The e gymnasium/auditorium section has six equally spaced window openings on both floors. The flanking entry doors are recessed and covered with limestone, which extends upward and includes a window. The classroom sections each have three windows on each floor.
