= William H. VanderHeyden House =

- U.S. National Register of Historic Places
- Michigan State Historic Site
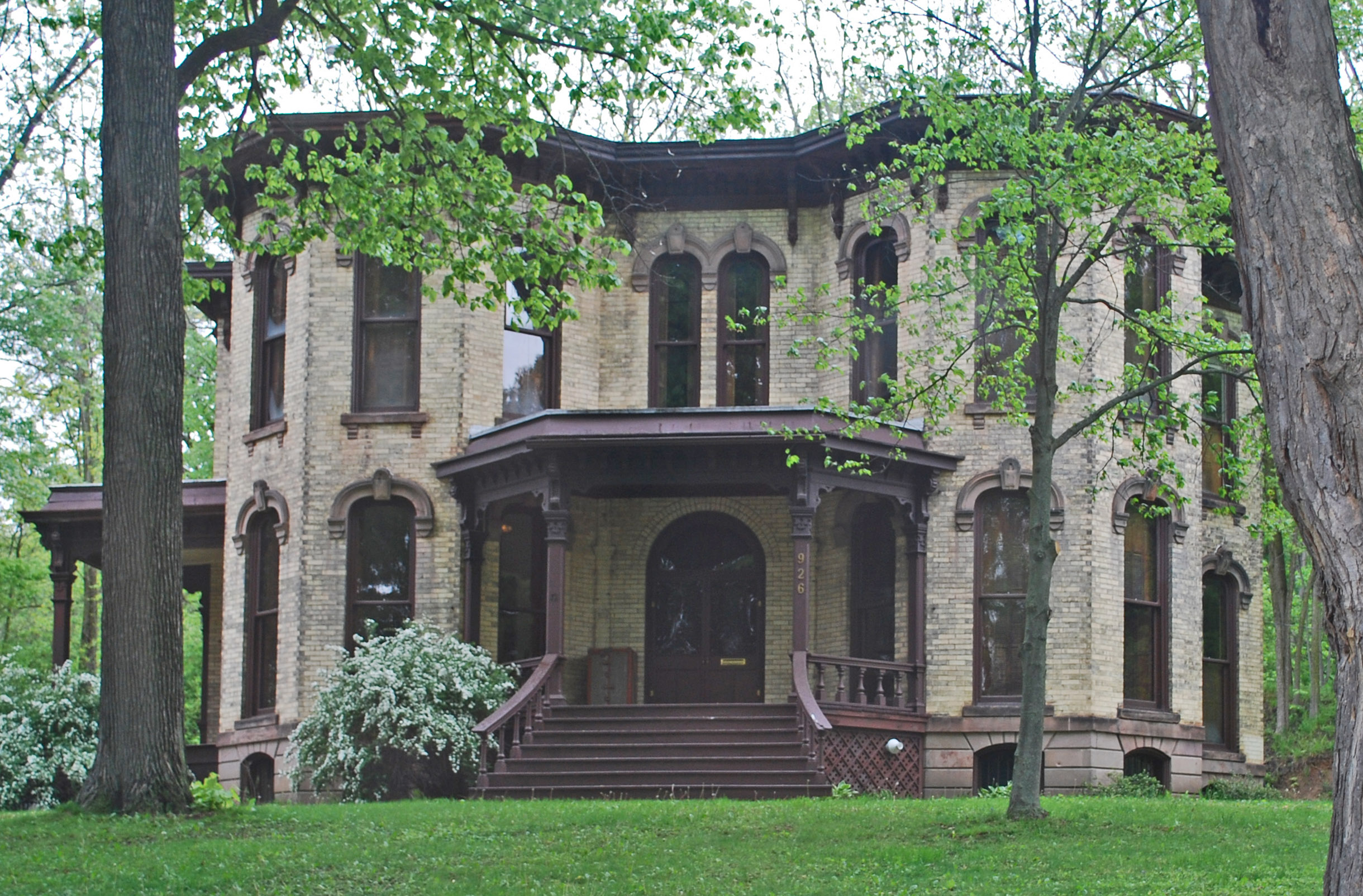

- Location within Michigan Location within the United States
- Interactive map
- Location: 926 W. Main St., Ionia, Michigan
- Coordinates: 42°58′52″N 85°4′46″W
- Area: 2.7 acres (1.1 ha)
- Built: 1879
- Built by: Capt. Lucias Mills
- Architectural style: Late Victorian, Italianate
- NRHP reference No.: 90001959
- Added to NRHP: December 28, 1990

The William H. VanderHeyden House is a private house located at 926 West Main Street in Ionia, Michigan. It was listed on the National Register of Historic Places in 1990.

== History ==
William H. VanderHeyden was born in 1836 in New York state, and began working in the brick industry. He moved to Ionia in 1864, where he married Emily Wood, the daughter of a brick maker. The next year, VanderHeyden purchased the Ionia brick works of Thomas Cornell, located near this location on Main Street. He expanded the business, winning the contract for the Ionia prison in 1875, and supplying bricks for many of the major homes, churches, and institutions in Ionia. By 1881, VanderHeyden had 45 employees.

In 1879, VanderHeyden began work on this house, located directly adjacent to the property that at the time contained his brickyard. Although the builder is unknown, it is likely Captain Lucias Mills, who constructed other prominent houses in Ionia. The house was built using brick from VanderHeyden's yard, and was probably completed in early 1880. VanderHeyden sold his business to his son Fred in 1892, and continued to live in this house until his death in 1910. His wife Emily Wood VanderHeyden lived in it until her death in 1918, after which it passed to Fred VanderHeyden. He lived there until his death in 1952, and his widow Leaner VanderHeyden lived there until her death in 1963. It has been sold to multiple owners since.

== Description ==
The VanderHeyden House is a two-story, symmetrical Italianate house constructed of ivory brick on a brick foundation sheathed in sandstone. It measures approximately 53 feet wide by 57 feet deep. The roof is a very low hipped design, with paired brackets supporting the eaves. It has an arched central entrance with two-story slant-sided bay windows to each side. The entrance is reached via wooden steps and a small wooden front porch. A timber-frame summer kitchen, one of two originally constructed, is attached to the rear of the house.

According to tradition, the house was designed to be a duplex, with the intention that William and Emily VanderHeyden would occupy one side and their son Fred the other. Thus, on the interior, the center entry hall is flanked on each side by a parlor, dining room, and kitchen.
