= John C. Blanchard House =

- U.S. National Register of Historic Places
- Michigan State Historic Site
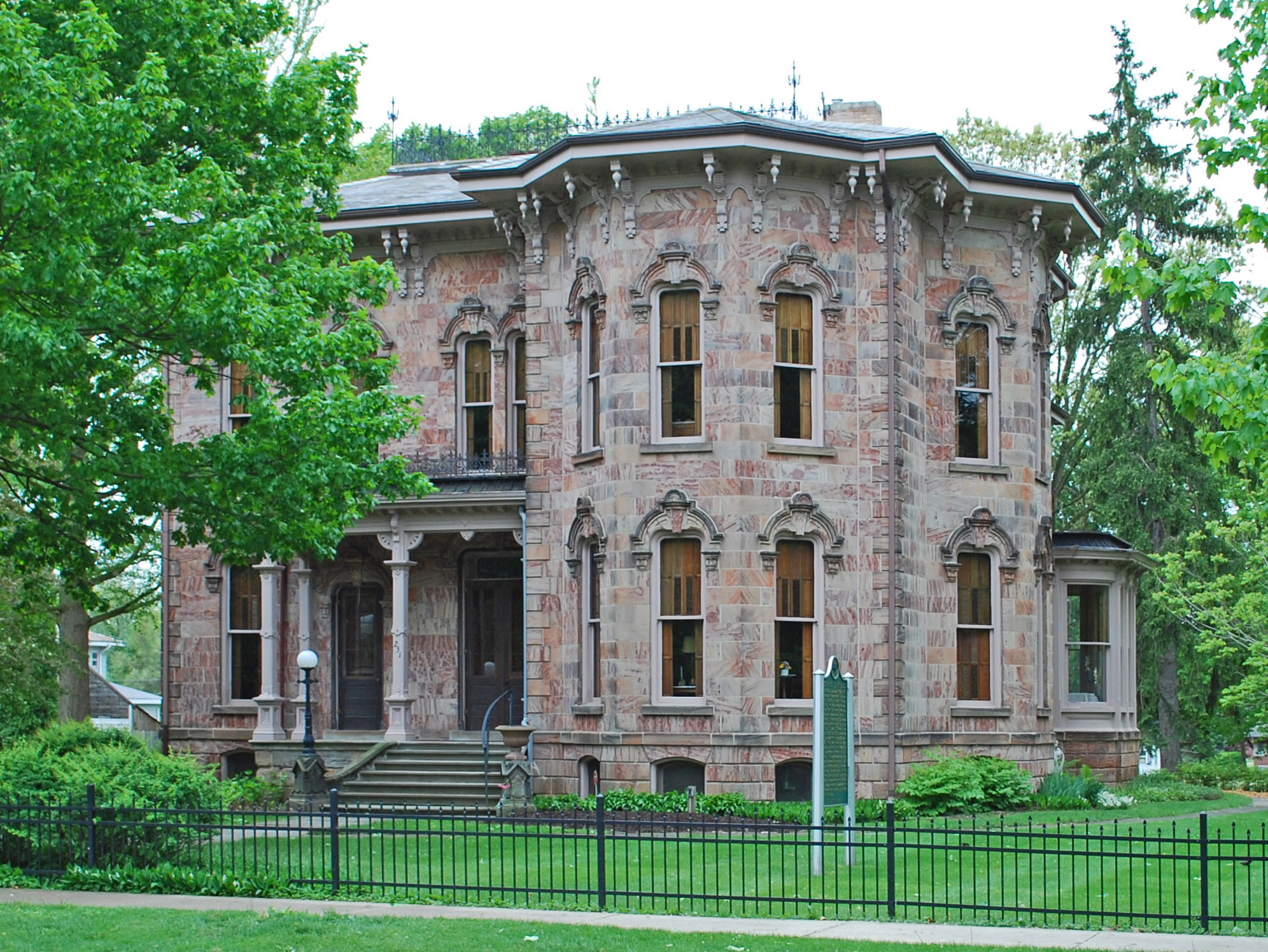

- Location within Michigan Location within the United States
- Interactive map
- Location: 253 E. Main St., Ionia, Michigan
- Coordinates: 42°58′58″N 85°3′28″W
- Area: less than one acre
- Built: 1879
- Architectural style: Italianate
- NRHP reference No.: 74002346
- Added to NRHP: July 24, 1974

The John C. Blanchard House was built as a private house located at 253 East Main Street in Ionia, Michigan. It was listed on the National Register of Historic Places in 1974. As of 2018, it serves as the museum for the Ionia County Historical Society.

== History ==
John C. Blanchard was born in New York in 1822. He began working in a mill at age 14, saved enough money to move west, and in 1836 transported himself to Michigan. He worked on farms near Detroit and in Shiawassee County, bought a farm, then moved on to work as a farm laborer and clerk in Lyons, Michigan. In 1840 he began studying law, and in 1842 was admitted to practice. In 1850, he was elected prosecuting attorney, and moved to Ionia. He eventually served in multiple political offices, including Registrar of the Ionia land office and President of Ionia Township.

In 1879, Blanchard began construction of this sandstone Italianate residence. The house was finished in 1881, and Blanchard lived there until his death in 1905. The Ionia County Historical Society eventually purchased the house in 1974, and it serves as their museum.

== Description ==
The Blanchard House is a massive Italianate mansion faced with pink and brown sandstone and with a slate hipped roof. The house measures 47 feet by 52 feet. It sits on a heavy foundation of smooth, squared sandstone about four feet high, topped with a protruding water table. Above this, quoins outline the corners of the house. The windows are tall, set on sandstone sills and topped with elaborate, semicircular sandstone window hoods. The entry is through a pair of heavy front doors on the porch, surrounded by baroque twisting wooden trim.

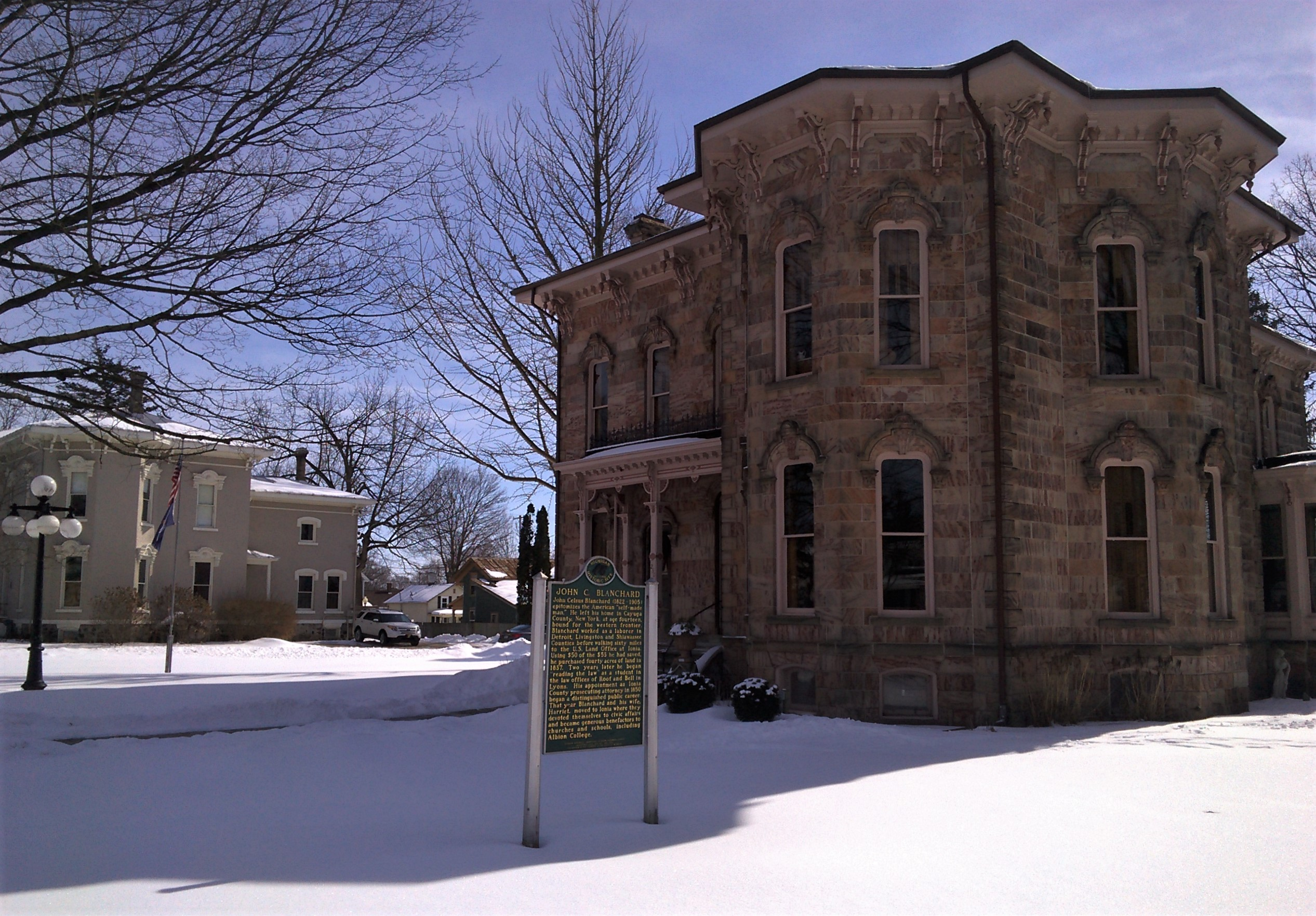
