= Ionia County Courthouse =

- U.S. National Register of Historic Places
- Michigan State Historic Site
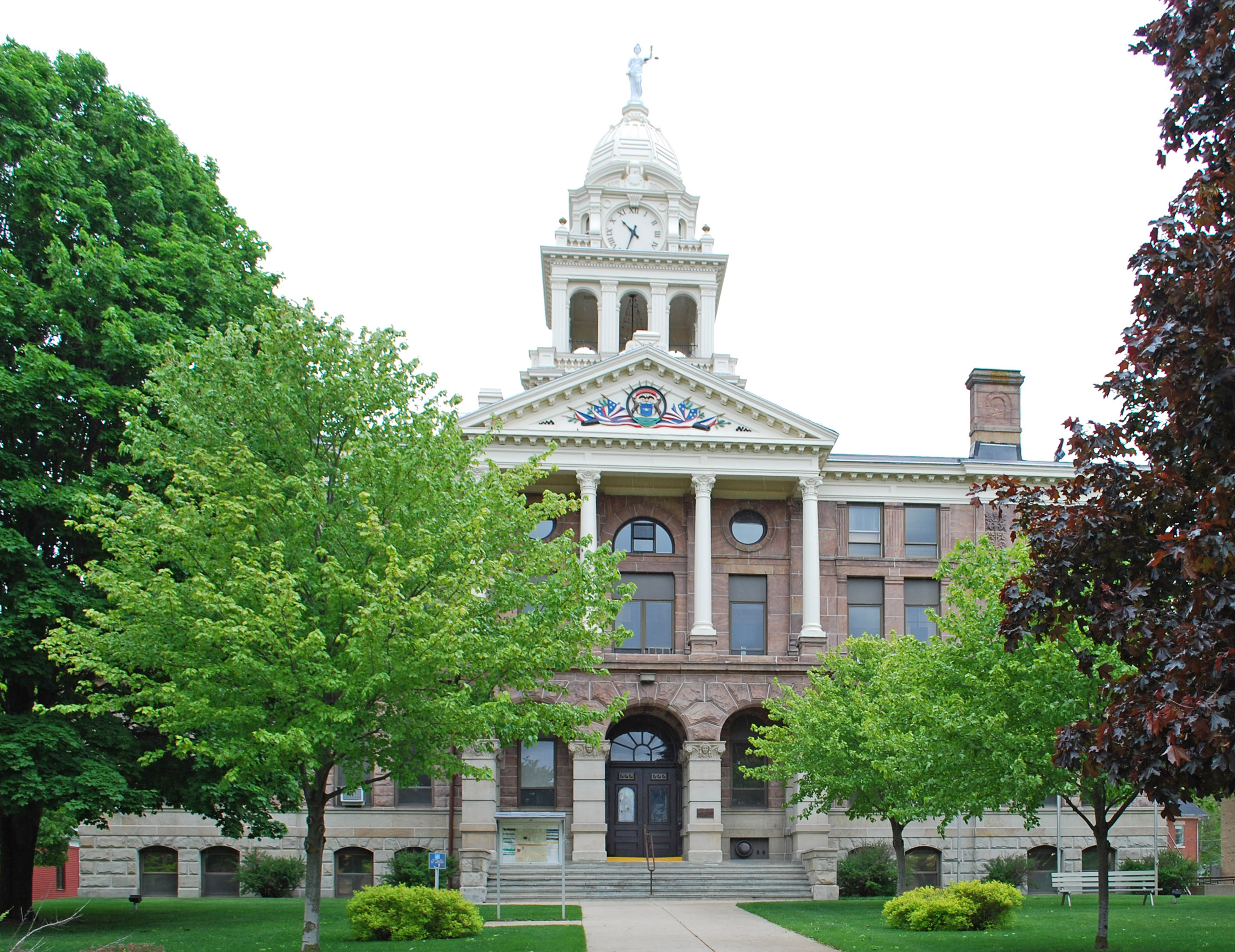

- Location within Michigan Location within the United States
- Interactive map
- Location: E. Main St., Ionia, Michigan
- Coordinates: 42°59′0″N 85°3′48″W
- Area: less than one acre
- Built: 1883
- Built by: Clare Allen
- Architect: David W. Gibbs & Co.
- Architectural style: Classical Revival
- NRHP reference No.: 79001155
- Added to NRHP: August 9, 1979

The Ionia County Courthouse is a government building located on East Main Street in Ionia, Michigan. It was listed on the National Register of Historic Places in 1979.

== History ==
Ionia County was organized in 1837. At first, there was a dispute over the location of the county seat, between Ionia and Lyons, but it was soon resolved in favor of Ionia. However, the first courthouse, located at this site, was a small one-story building. By the 1800s, this building was far too small, and a building committee was formed to decide on a replacement. The committee chose Toledo, Ohio architect David W. Gibbs to design the building, and contractor Clare Allen to build it. Ground was broken on the project in 1883. Clare Allen went bankrupt in 1885, and the building committee oversaw the completion of the courthouse in 1886.

Electricity was installed in the building in 1922, and extensive remodeling was completed in the 1980s. Construction began on an addition in 2017. The 1883 building is still used by the county government.

== Description ==
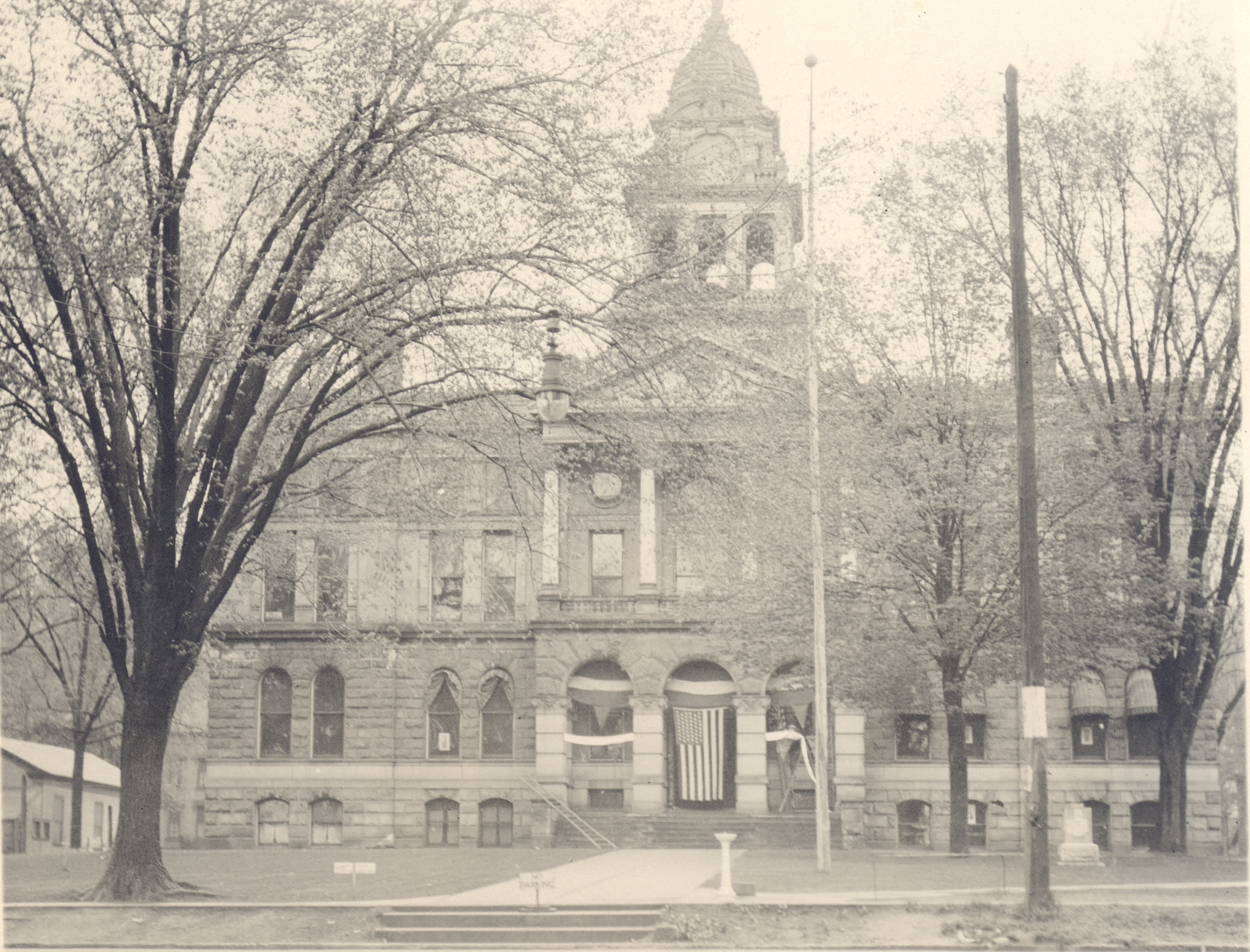
The courthouse in 1926

The Ionia County Courthouse is a 3 1/2-story sandstone Classical Revival structure, measuring 120 feet by 80 feet. The sandstone of the lowest floor is a light Ohio sandstone; the remainder of the building is of a worm brown Ionia sandstone. The courthouse sits on a slight rise in a broad courthouse lawn. The front facade has a prominent projecting two-tier portico reached by seven wide steps. The lower tier of the portico has a triple-arched sandstone loggia atop sandstone piers; the upper tier is of wood. The entryway is through a pair of arched doors under the portico. The bays beside the portico are slightly recessed, while the end bays project slightly. A wooden frieze and dentiled cornice fins across the top of the entire building, and the roof is crowned with an elaborate four-stage domed cupola topped with a statue of justice.

Secondary entrances are locate in projecting bays on the sides of the building. The rear also has a projecting central bay with an arched entrance and double doors similar to those on the front. The interior of thee courthouse is a hollow square, with courtrooms and offices located around the edges.
