= Lovell-Webber House =

- U.S. National Register of Historic Places
- Michigan State Historic Site
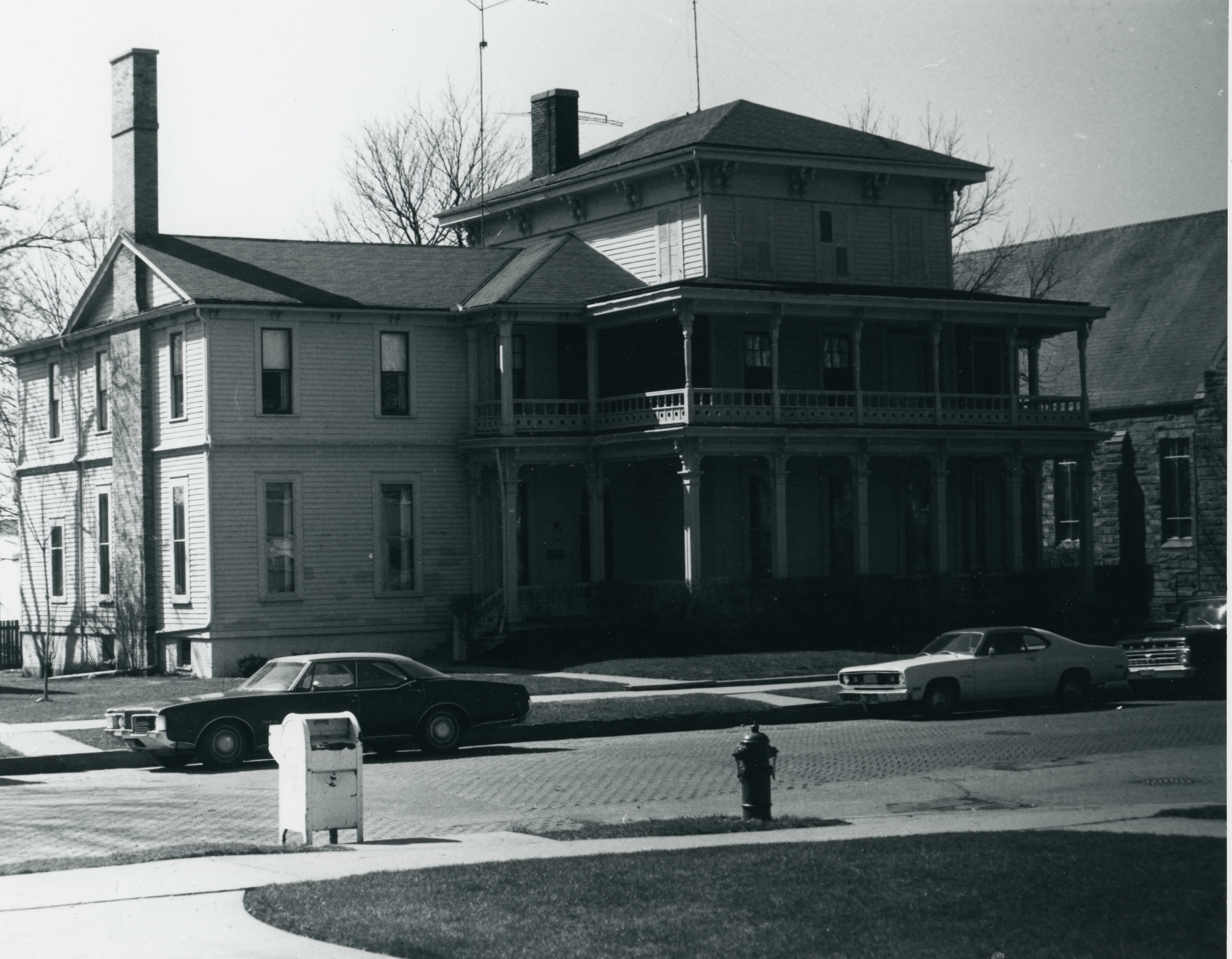
- Lovell-Webber House, 1972

- Location within Michigan Location within the United States
- Interactive map
- Location: 111 E. Main St., Ionia, Michigan
- Coordinates: 42°59′1″N 85°3′53″W
- Area: less than one acre
- Built: 1837
- Architect: Orry Waterbury
- Architectural style: Greek Revival, Steamboat Gothic
- Demolished: ?
- NRHP reference No.: 74000988
- Added to NRHP: July 30, 1974

The Lovell-Webber House was a private house located at 111 East Main Street in Ionia, Michigan. It was listed on the National Register of Historic Places in 1974. It has been demolished.

== History ==
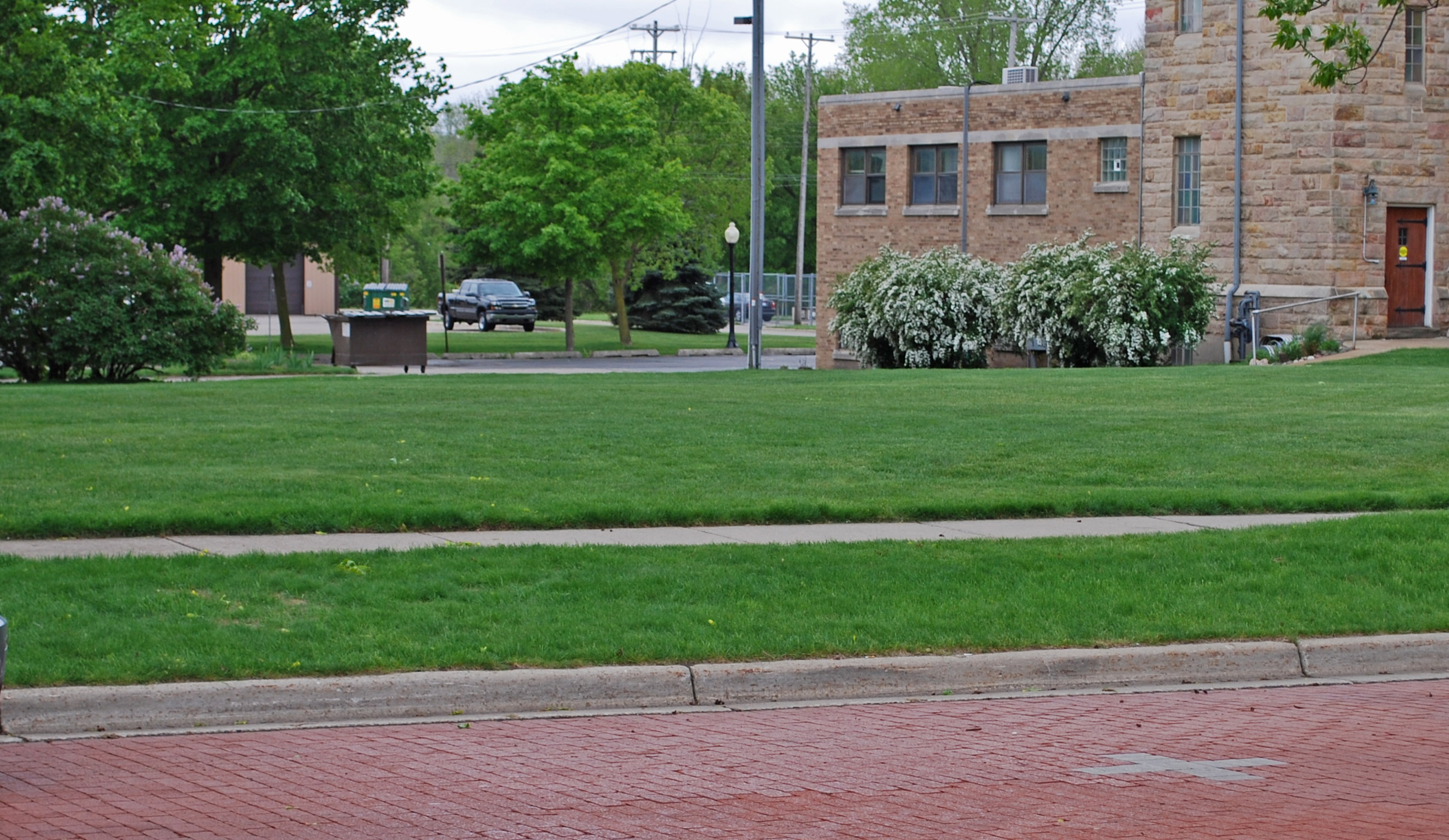
Former location of the Lovell-Webber House

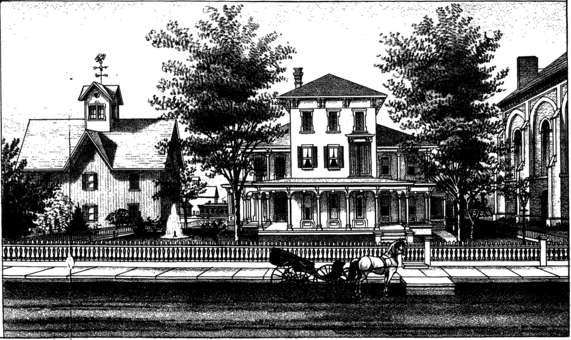
Lovell-Webber House, c. 1881

Cyrus Lovell was born in Vermont in 1804 and came to Michigan in 1829. He settled for two years in Ann Arbor, then moved the Kalamazoo. In 1836 he moved again, this time to Ionia, where he established the first law practice in the town. Soon after, in 1837, he constructed the first portion of this residence, a two-story Greek Revival structure. Also in 1837 he became the first supervisor of Ionia Township. In 1848 and 1854 he was elected to the state legislature in 1848 and 1854, and was chosen as Speaker of the House in 1855. Lovell lived in the house until 1873, when he sold the house to George W. Webber, and purchased Webber's former house. Lovell died in 1895.

George W. Webber was born in Vermont in 1825 and moved to Michigan in 1852. He worked for six years in lumbering in Manistee County and then began a retail business in Lyons, Michigan. In 1861 he moved to Ionia, becoming engaged in both lumbering and farming. In 1873 he organized the Second National Bank of Ionia; that same year he purchased this house from Cyrus Lovell. After purchasing the house, Webber hired architect Orry Waterbury to design some substantial alterations, with the original house raised and placed atop a new first floor. Webber served as Ionia's mayor in 1874 and 1875, and was elected to the 47th United States Congress in 1880. At some point, he added a second floor porch that gave the house a steamboat Gothic look. He owned this house until his death in 1900.

Afterward, the house was turned into a combination apartment and residence. The house was demolished at some point after 1974.

== Description ==
The Lovell-Webber House was a large rambling wooden structure, measuring about 60 feet across and a little more deep. It consisted of a main, three-story section and a two-story addition. It sat on a rough stone foundation, and the main section had a truncated hip roof while the addition had a gabled roof. The main section had long, narrow paneless windows on the first floor (built in the 1870s), with unpaneled doors. The upper floors (constructed in the 1830s) had six over six windows encased in plain wooden molding, and the second floor door was paneled and surrounded by a plain transom and sidelights. Porch columns also varied between the stories.
