= Muir Church of Christ =

Historic church in Michigan, United States

- U.S. National Register of Historic Places
- Michigan State Historic Site
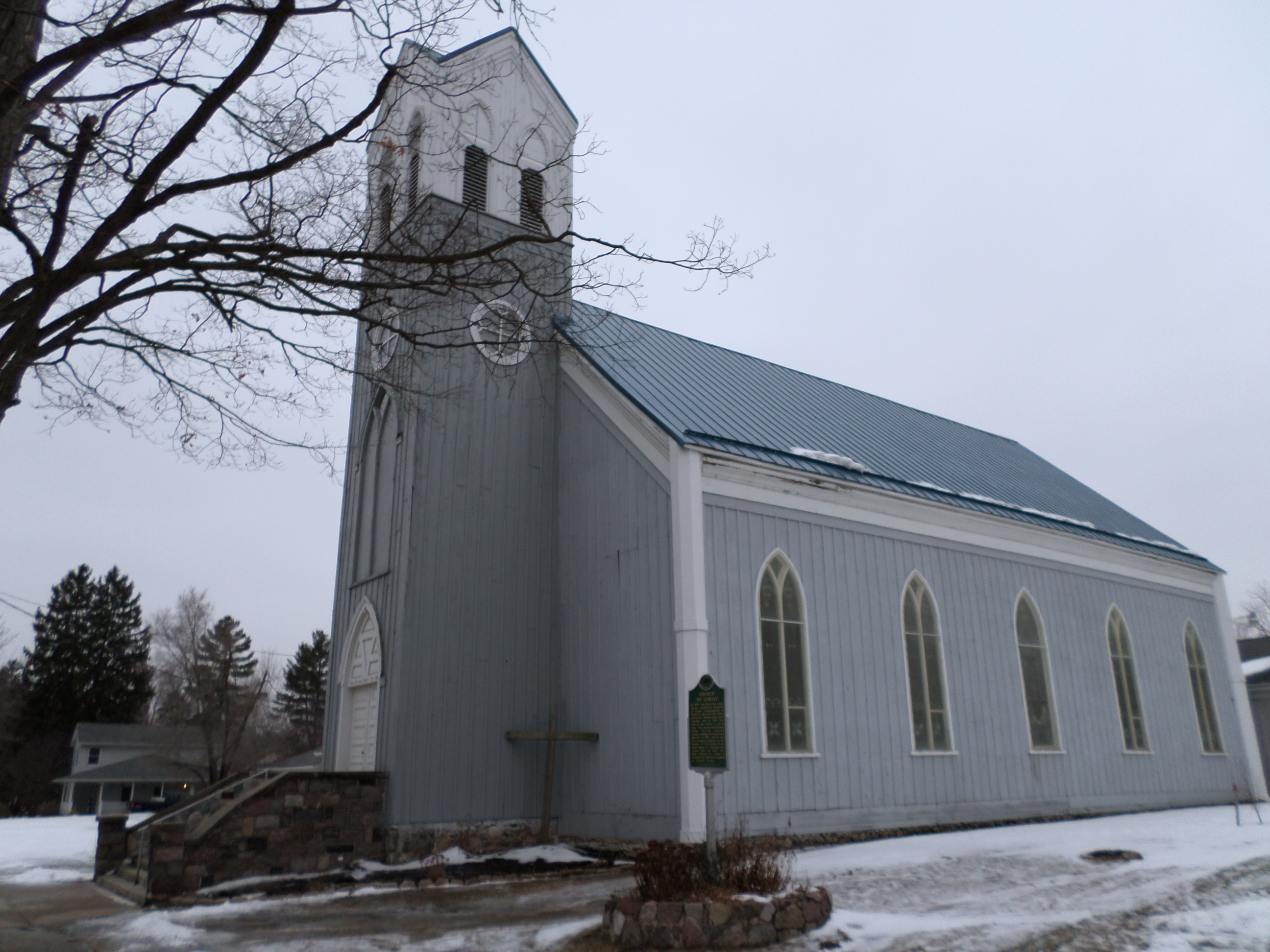
- The church in January 2015

- Location within Michigan Location within the United States
- Interactive map
- Location: 138 Garden St. Muir, Michigan
- Coordinates: 42°59′59″N 84°56′28″W
- Area: less than one acre
- Built: 1861
- Architectural style: Gothic
- NRHP reference No.: 83000852

Significant dates
- Added to NRHP: February 17, 1983
- Designated MSHS: May 17, 1973

Muir Church of Christ, also known as the First Christian Church of Muir, is a historic church located at 138 Garden Street in Muir, Michigan, United States. It was built in 1861 and added to the National Register of Historic Places in 1983.

== History ==
The Muir Church of Christ was organized in Lyons, Michigan in 1856 with 25 members as a member of the Disciples of Christ denomination. The Reverend Isaac Errett was the first pastor. Meetings were first held in Lyons, but quickly moved to the Muir schoolhouse. By 1858 the congregation had grown to 148 members. In 1861, this church was constructed at a cost of $3,215.06.

The Muir church was the mother church for the Disciples of Christ denomination In the Grand River Valley, and is one of Michigan's oldest Disciples of Christ congregations. Isaac Errett, the founding pastor, remained with the church until 1866, although he was absent much of the time, helping found another church in Detroit and administering to troops in the Civil War. Errett was great friends with James A. Garfield, who visited the Muir church in 1861.

== Description ==
The Muir Church of Christ is a single-story, rectangular, gray, wood-frame Gothic Church clad with board-and-batten siding on a low fieldstone foundation. The church measures 70 feet by 30 feet. It has a square central projecting entrance tower topped by a cross-gable-roof belfry, with double entry doors in the base. Each side of the building has five Gothic windows with central mullions.

On the interior, there is a vestibule through the entry doors, which leads into the sanctuary. The sanctuary floor is made of dark-stained pine, and the walls are plaster. The floor slopes gently downward from the entrance to the pulpit. There are four rows of pews arranged with a central and two side aisles. The pulpit is set on a small platform. The sanctuary ceiling is of pressed metal, likely dating from 1906.
