= Hall-Fowler Memorial Library =

- U.S. National Register of Historic Places
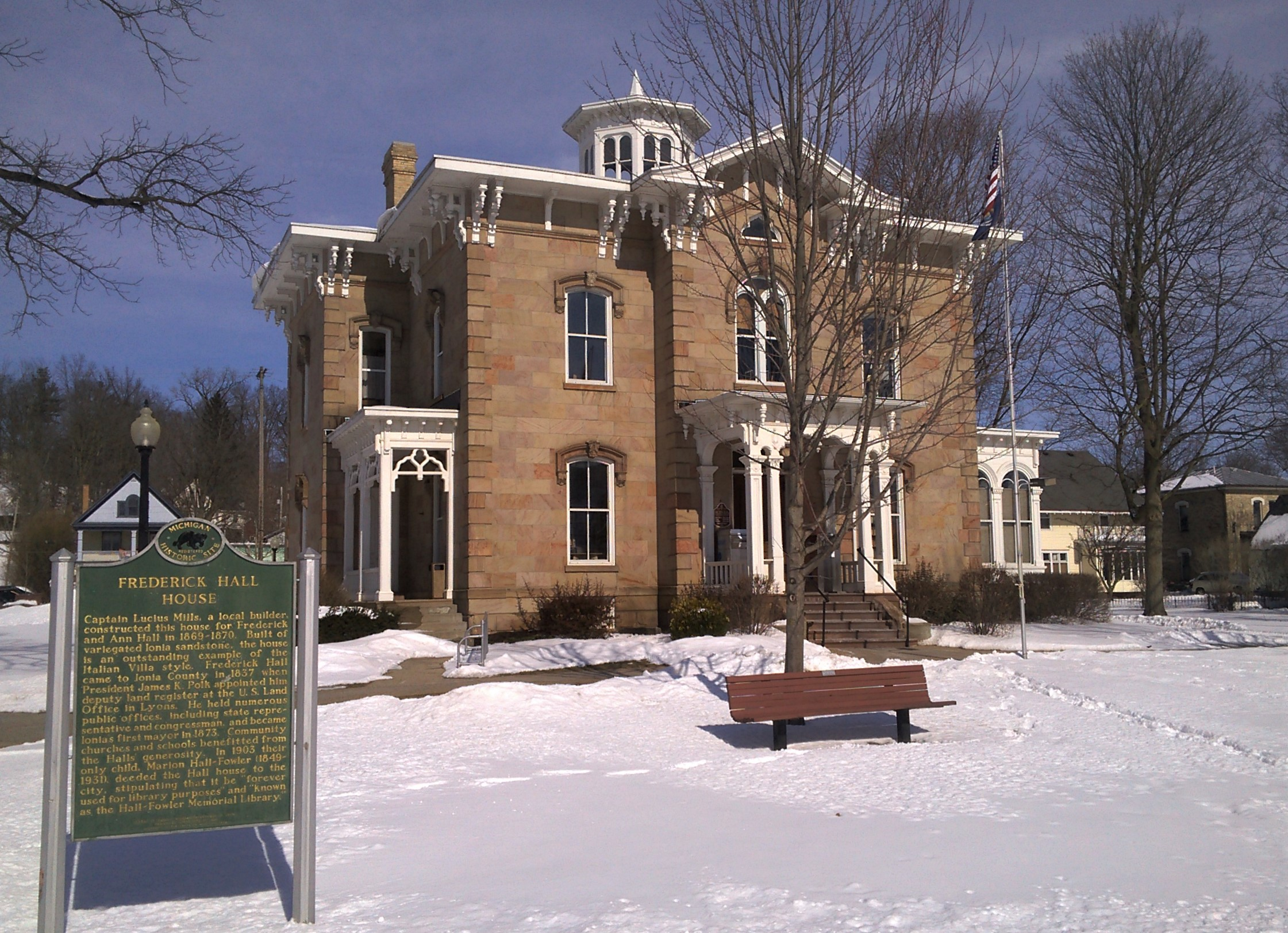
- Hall-Fowler Memorial Library, 2019

- Location within Michigan Location within the United States
- Interactive map
- Location: 126 E. Main St., Ionia, Michigan
- Coordinates: 42°59′1″N 85°3′44″W
- Area: 0.5 acres (0.20 ha)
- Built: 1869
- Built by: Capt. Lucius Mills
- Architectural style: Italianate
- NRHP reference No.: 71000398
- Added to NRHP: May 6, 1971

The Hall-Fowler Memorial Library, also known as the Frederick Hall House, is a former mansion located at 126 East Main Street in Ionia, Michigan. It now houses the Ionia Community Library. It was listed on the National Register of Historic Places in 1971, and is part of the Historic American Buildings Survey.

== History ==
Frederick Hall was born in Vermont in 1816, and moved to Michigan in 1836. He came to Ionia in 1841 and began buying and selling timberland, eventually becoming probably the richest man in the county. He was appointed by President James K. Polk as the receiver of public money for the land office at Ionia in 1845. He was elected to serve in the state legislature in 1849, and was later a candidate for Congress and for Lieutenant Governor. He became the first mayor of Ionia in 1873, and was a director of the Ionia and Lansing Railroad and President of the First National Bank of Ionia.

In 1869-70, Hall hired Capt. Lucius Mills to construct this house for his family. Hall lived here until his death in 1883, after which the house passed on to Hall's daughter, Marion Hall-Fowler, and her husband Joshua Lounsburgy Fowler. Joshua Fowler died in 1901; Marion gave the house to the city of Ionia in 1903 as a memorial to her parents and husband, to be used as a public library.

== Description ==
The Hall-Fowler Memorial Library is an immense two-story Italianate building with a service wing to the rear. The building is constructed of variegated ashlar sandstone, ringing from yellow gray to reddish brown, and has a low hip roof with extended eaves with highly ornate bracketed cornices. An octagonal cupola is located in the center of the roof. The windows are two-over-two double hung units in an elongated with a stilted segmental window arch. Decorative extended wooden porches cover the entrance ways, which contain double doors made of intricate paneled oak.

On the interior, the first floor has an entry vestibule leading into a central hall with two major rooms on each side. Two rooms are in the rear wing, and at the end of the hall is a delicately winding walnut stairway leading to the second floor. The second floor contains a central hall with two rooms on each side; over the entrance vestibule is another small chamber. The rear wing contains three servant's bedrooms connected by a side hall. Decorative plaster cornices and ceiling friezes are in several rooms.
