= St. John the Baptist Catholic Church (Hubbardston, Michigan) =

Historic church in Michigan, United States

- St. John the Baptist Catholic Church Complex
- U.S. National Register of Historic Places
- U.S. Historic district
- Michigan State Historic Site
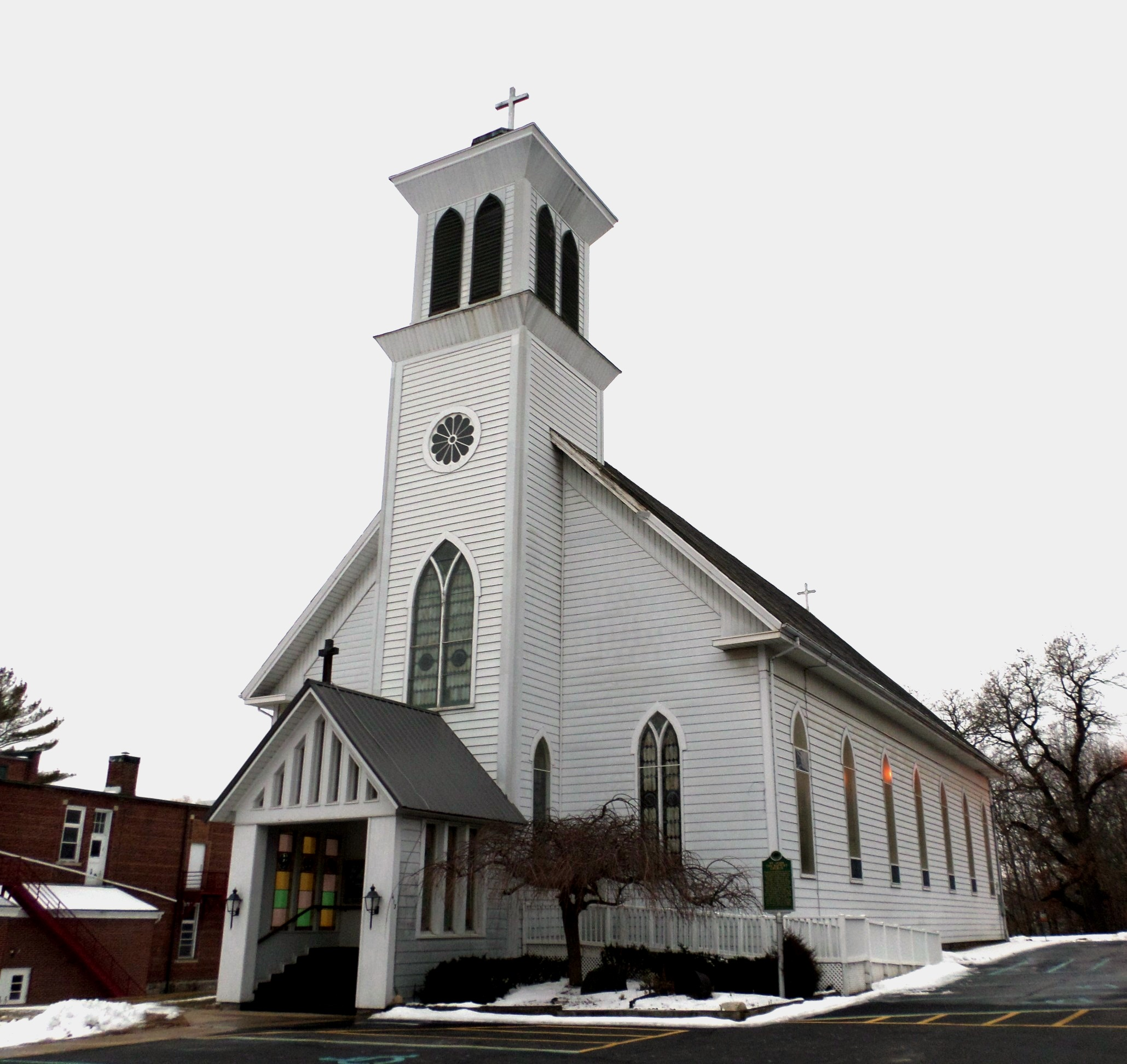
- The church in January 2015

- Location within Michigan Location within the United States
- Interactive map
- Location: 324 S. Washington Ave. Hubbardston, Michigan
- Coordinates: 43°5′32″N 84°50′50″W
- Area: 14.8 acres (6.0 ha)
- Built: 1869
- Architect: Donaldson and Meier
- Architectural style: Gothic Revival, Renaissance Revival
- NRHP reference No.: 01001019

Significant dates
- Added to NRHP: September 24, 2001
- Designated MSHS: January 18, 2001

St. John the Baptist Catholic Church is a historic church, with an associated rectory, school, and cemetery, located at 324 S. Washington Avenue in Hubbardston, Michigan. The church was completed in 1869. It was added to the National Register of Historic Places and listed as a Michigan State Historic Site in 2001. The parish is clustered with St. Mary parish in Carson City, Michigan.

== History ==
John Cowman, who settled near here in 1849, is likely the first Irish Catholic immigrant in the area. By 1851, six other families had settled nearby, and Fr. George Godez, pastor at Westphalia, began making pastoral visits. In 1853, a small chapel was built on the Cowman farm. More settlers arrived over the next few years, and in 1855 the parish of St. John the Baptist on Fish Creek was established, with Fr. Charles Bolte appointed pastor. By this time the settlement of Hubbardston, which had started with a sawmill, was well underway. Commercial buildings began to appear in 1855, and the village itself was platted in 1865.

By the 1860s, the original St. John the Baptist had been enlarged several times, but the congregation was still outgrowing the space. Additionally, the location outside the village was becoming inconvenient. In 1868, the parish purchased a plot in Hubbardston and began construction of this church. The building was completed in 1869, and was at the time the largest church building in the county. A parish school was started in 1883, using a former public school building located across the street from the church. The cemetery near the original church location was used until 1884, when the cemetery near the present church was opened. A new rectory, designed by Detroit architects Donaldson and Meier, was built in 1907-08. A school designed by the same firm was built in 1917, replacing the previous building.

However, the school ceased function in 1965. The last parish priest retired in 2005, and the parish is clustered with St. Mary parish in Carson City.

== Description ==
The St. John the Baptist Catholic Church complex stands atop high ground at the edge of Hubbardston. The complex includes the church proper, a rectory, a garage, a school, and a cemetery, along with a contemporary parish center.

The church is a rectangular, wood-frame Gothic Revival building with a slate gable roof on a fieldstone foundation. It is clad with clapboard and has tall pointed arch windows. The front facade is symmetrical, with a central, partly projecting square plan entry tower. A belfry with paired Gothic openings sits atop the tower. The interior contains two tiers of seventeen pews flanking a central aisle; the furnishings date from the 1940s-60s.

The rectory is a two-story hip-roof, red brick building with symmetrical five-bay facade on a random ashlar basement. The school is a two-story, rectangular, brick-walled building on a random ashlar basement. A partly projecting tower in the center of the front facade has arches giving it a vaguely Italian look. A 1960s one-story, flat-roof addition is attached to one side. The in-use section of the cemetery measures 400 feet by 350 feet, and includes large hemlocks, oaks, and other trees. Cemetery grounds include a variety of nineteenth and twentieth century monuments, as well as a small stone gable-front receiving vault.
