= Alvah N. Belding Memorial Library =

- U.S. National Register of Historic Places
- Michigan State Historic Site
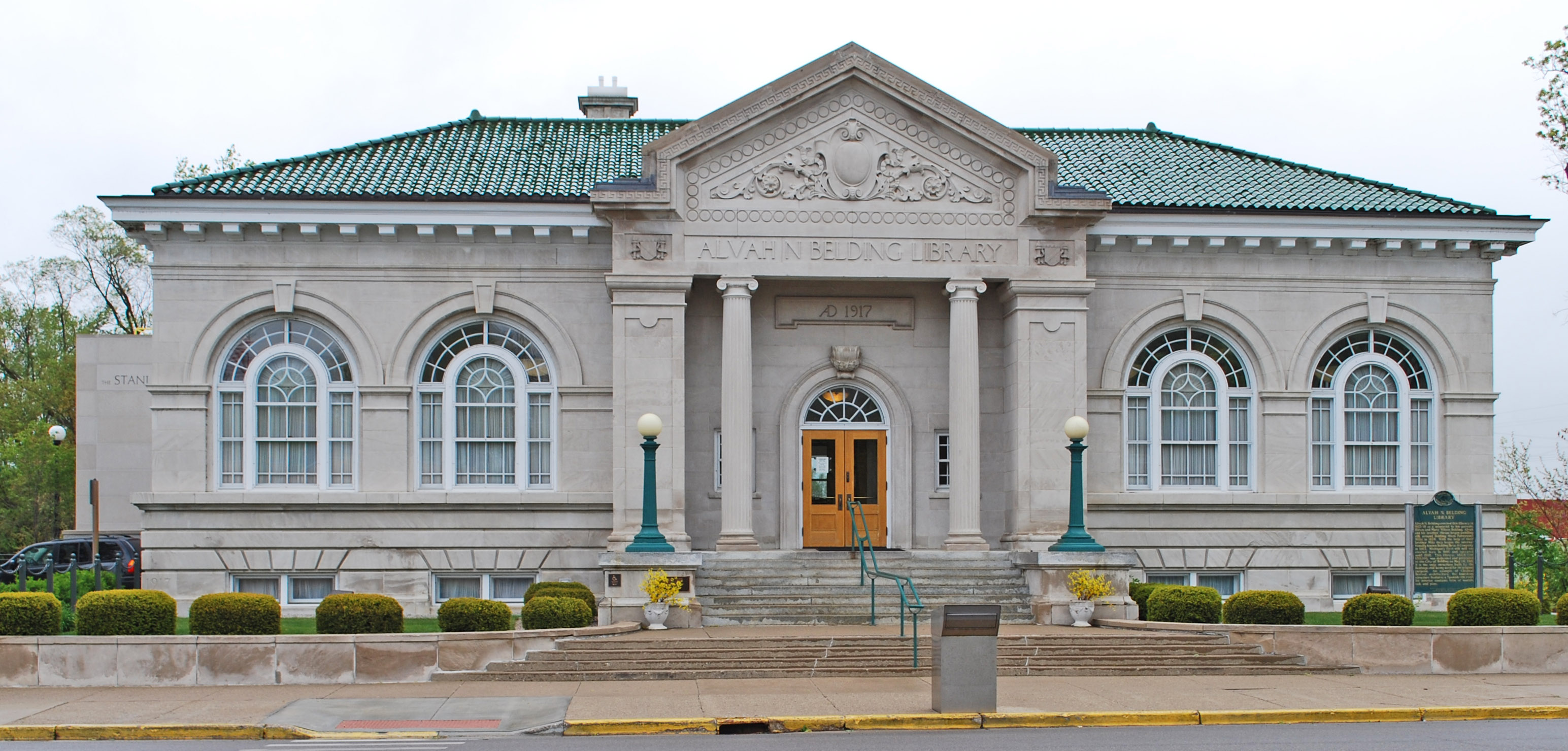

- Location within Michigan Location within the United States
- Interactive map
- Location: 302 E. Main St., Belding, Michigan
- Coordinates: 43°5′53″N 85°13′34″W
- Area: less than one acre
- Built: 1917
- Architect: Frank P. Allen & Son
- Architectural style: Beaux Arts
- NRHP reference No.: 93000427
- Added to NRHP: May 21, 1993

The Alvah N. Belding Memorial Library is a public library building located at 302 East Main Street in Belding, Michigan. It was listed on the National Register of Historic Places in 1993.

== History ==
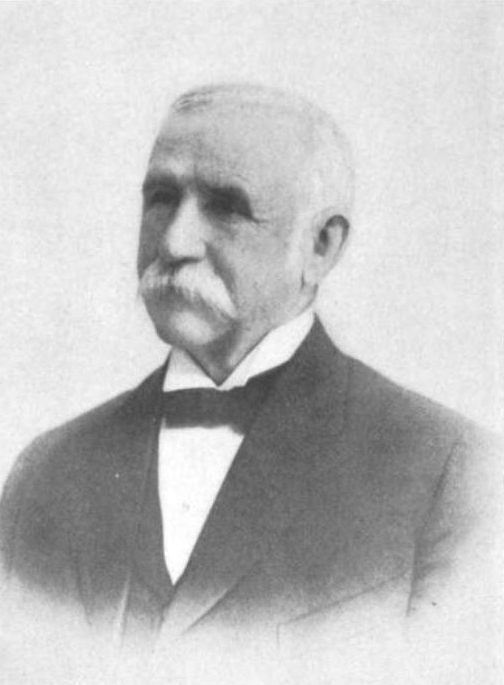
Alvah Norton Belding (1838–1925)

Hiram Belding and Mary Wilson Belding moved from Ashfield, Massachusetts to a farmstead in what is now Belding in 1855. With them was their 17-year-old son, Alvah N. Belding. They were soon joined by Alvah's brother Hiram. However, farming proved unprofitable, and in 1857 the Belding brothers began a trade selling silk thread to nearby settlers. By 1863 the brothers opened a retail shop in Chicago, and in 1864 began manufacturing their own thread. Although this first venture was rocky, Belding Brothers eventually had multiple manufacturing facilities throughout the country. In 1886 they built their first factory in Belding, the Richardson Silk Mill. This was followed by three others, and by the beginning of the twentieth century, silk manufacturing was the major part of Belding's economy. Concurrently, the town's population grew, from just over 500 people in 1880 to 1700 in 1890 and over 4000 in 1910.

As Belding grew, so did its social clubs. The Ladies' Literary Exchange Club (Ladies' Literary Society) was formed in 1897. In 1913, the Club proposed the formation of a public library. The city approved the proposal, and library board was elected. The first public library opened in the city hall in 1915. In 1917, Alvah N. Belding donated $50,000 for the construction of a permanent library building. The Grand Rapids architectural firm of Frank P. Allen & Son was selected to design the library. The cornerstone was laid in the summer of 1917 and the building completed in 1918.

However, the next few decades marked a downturn for Belding, as the silk industry gave way to synthetic fabrics. Alvah Belding died in 1925, and the silk mills were sold. As the Great Depression worsened, the mills were closed by 1932. During this time, the library was a social center for the city, used by the unemployed in Belding. Belding slowly emerged from the Depression, but was no longer the single-industry town it had been before. The old mills were demolished or repurposed. The library is the only building associated with Alvah N. Belding that remains in its original use.

== Description ==
The library is a T-shaped, hip-roofed structure of Bedford limestone, with a shed-roofed extension at the rear. It is located on a sloping lot on the bank of the Flat River, so that the basement level can be accessed from the rear. The roof is clad with green Spanish tile. The main elevation has a prominent central entrance portico, consisting of a pediment supported by two columns. The entrance to the building is through an arched doorway, which is flanked by small single-sash six-over-six windows. The portico is flanked by large round arch windows capped by limestone headmoldings. The side facades are similar in style to the front.

On the interior, there is a central lobby and desk, with two principal reading rooms, one on each side. A small cloakroom and stairs to the basement are beside the entry vestibule. The basement level contains a large hall and an assembly room, along with furnace and storage rooms.
