= Belding station =

- Pere Marquette Railway Belding Depot
- U.S. National Register of Historic Places
- Michigan State Historic Site
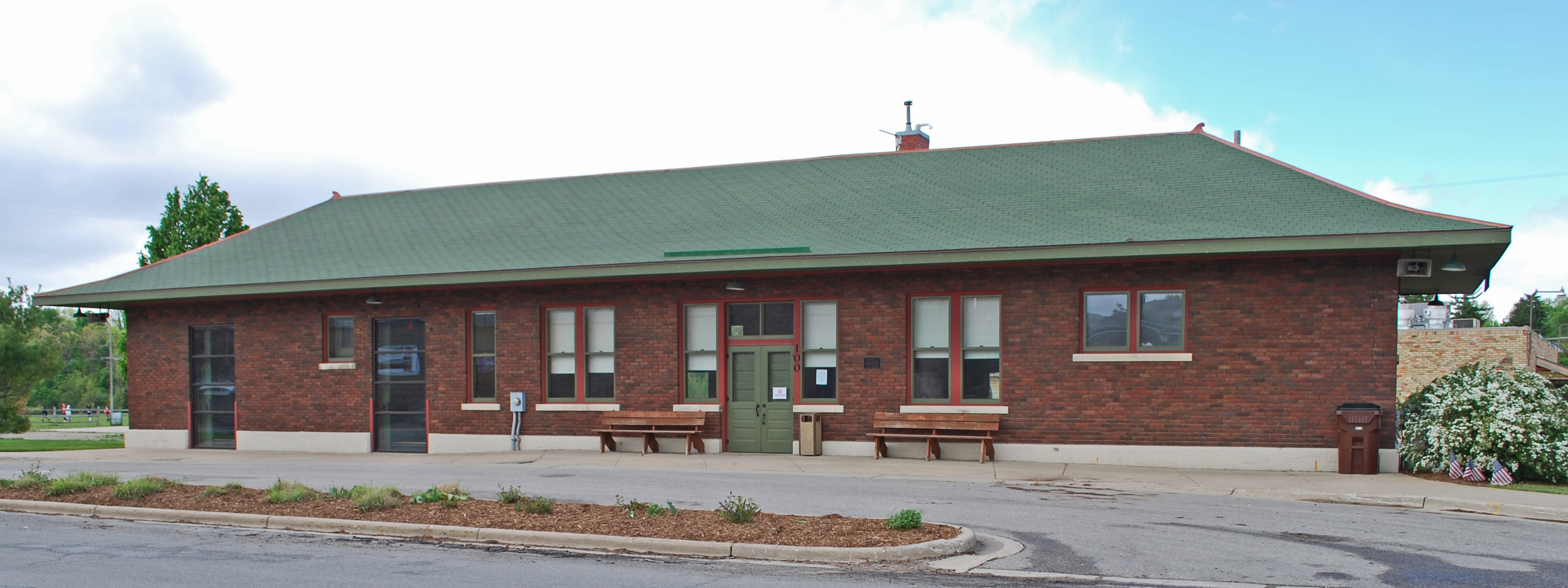

- Location within Michigan Location within the United States
- Interactive map
- Location: 100 Depot St., Belding, Michigan
- Coordinates: 43°5′55″N 85°13′46″W
- Area: less than one acre
- Built: 1920
- Architectural style: hipped roof railroad depot
- NRHP reference No.: 97000282
- Added to NRHP: March 28, 1997

The Pere Marquette Railway Belding Depot is a former railroad station located at 100 Depot Street in Belding, Michigan. It was listed on the National Register of Historic Places in 1997. It is owned and used by the city of Belding.

== History ==
Belding was first settled in 1839, but remained a tiny hamlet until 1871, when a sawmill was built in town. The Detroit, Lansing and Lake Michigan Rail Road soon constructed a branch line to serve the village. This line carried only freight until 1888, when the Belding brothers opened their silk mills. A passenger depot was constructed on this site at about that time. In 1899, the Pere Marquette Railway was first organized from the merger of several railroads, including the railway that operated Belding line.

In 1920, the Pere Marquette Railway replaced the original 1888 depot with this one, for reasons unknown. Passenger traffic through the depot was heavy initially, but Belding's silk industry collapsed in the 1930s. The railway discontinued passenger service to Belding in 1941. The building was used as storage facilities until the early 1990s. In 1994, the city of Belding rehabilitated the structure to serve as a meeting place for the city council and as a transit center.

== Description ==
The Pere Marquette Railway Belding Depot is a long, single story reddish-brown brick building with a low hip roof with overhanging eaves. A central hip-roof projection on the track side originally held the ticket/telegrapher's office. The main entrance is on the street side; this enters into the former waiting room; the building also houses a former women's waiting room (now a break room) and the ticket office.

Preceding station	Chesapeake and Ohio Railway	Following station
Smyrna toward Grand Rapids	Grand Rapids – Bay City	Greenville toward Bay City
