= Ionia Township, Michigan =

- Township
- Location within Michigan Location within the United States
- Coordinates: 42°59′25″N 85°1′51″W
- Country: United States
- State: Michigan
- County: Ionia

Area
  - Total: 34.1 sq mi (88.2 km^{2})
  - Land: 33.7 sq mi (87.2 km^{2})
  - Water: 0.39 sq mi (1.0 km^{2})
- Elevation: 719 ft (219 m)

Population (2020)
  - Total: 3,961
  - Density: 118/sq mi (45.4/km^{2})
- Time zone: UTC-5 (Eastern (EST))
  - Summer (DST): UTC-4 (EDT)
- ZIP code: 48846
- Area code: 616
- FIPS code: 26-40880
- GNIS feature ID: 1626522
- Website: https://ioniatownshipmi.gov/

Ionia Township is a civil township of Ionia County in the U.S. state of Michigan. The population was 3,961 at the 2020 census. The city of Ionia is mostly within the township, but is administratively autonomous.

== Geography ==
According to the United States Census Bureau, the township has a total area of 34.1 square miles (88 km^{2}), of which 33.7 square miles (87 km^{2}) is land and 0.4 square miles (1.0 km^{2}) (1.17%) is water.

== Demographics ==
As of the census of 2000, there were 3,669 people, 1,335 households, and 1,022 families residing in the township. The population density was 109.0 inhabitants per square mile (42.1/km^{2}). There were 1,441 housing units at an average density of 42.8 per square mile (16.5/km^{2}). The racial makeup of the township was 95.88% White, 0.14% African American, 0.22% Native American, 0.30% Asian, 2.02% from other races, and 1.44% from two or more races. Hispanic or Latino of any race were 3.90% of the population.

There were 1,335 households, out of which 37.2% had children under the age of 18 living with them, 59.6% were married couples living together, 11.5% had a female householder with no husband present, and 23.4% were non-families. 18.7% of all households were made up of individuals, and 6.8% had someone living alone who was 65 years of age or older. The average household size was 2.74 and the average family size was 3.07.

In the township the population was spread out, with 28.8% under the age of 18, 9.2% from 18 to 24, 29.2% from 25 to 44, 23.0% from 45 to 64, and 9.8% who were 65 years of age or older. The median age was 33 years. For every 100 females, there were 100.7 males. For every 100 females age 18 and over, there were 100.2 males.

The median income for a household in the township was $44,659, and the median income for a family was $47,083. Males had a median income of $35,253 versus $24,333 for females. The per capita income for the township was $17,985. About 6.2% of families and 6.9% of the population were below the poverty line, including 6.9% of those under age 18 and 8.1% of those age 65 or over.
