= Lyons, Michigan =

- Village
- Location of Lyons, Michigan
- Coordinates: 42°59′00″N 84°56′44″W
- Country: United States
- State: Michigan
- County: Ionia

Area
  - Total: 1.35 sq mi (3.49 km^{2})
  - Land: 1.22 sq mi (3.15 km^{2})
  - Water: 0.13 sq mi (0.34 km^{2})
- Elevation: 656 ft (200 m)

Population (2020)
  - Total: 763
  - Density: 626.8/sq mi (241.99/km^{2})
- Time zone: UTC-5 (Eastern (EST))
  - Summer (DST): UTC-4 (EDT)
- ZIP code: 48851
- Area code: 989
- FIPS code: 26-49900
- GNIS feature ID: 2399213
- Website: https://lyonsvillage.org/

Lyons is a village in Ionia County in the U.S. state of Michigan. As of the 2020 census, Lyons had a population of 763. Most of the village is within Lyons Township. A small portion extends west into Ionia Township.

== Geography ==
According to the United States Census Bureau, the village has a total area of 1.35 square miles (3.50 km^{2}), of which 1.22 square miles (3.16 km^{2}) is land and 0.13 square miles (0.34 km^{2}) is water.

== Demographics ==
Historical population
Census	Pop.	Note	%±
1860	639		—
1870	704		10.2%
1880	747		6.1%
1890	612		−18.1%
1900	656		7.2%
1910	611		−6.9%
1920	574		−6.1%
1930	592		3.1%
1940	596		0.7%
1950	683		14.6%
1960	687		0.6%
1970	758		10.3%
1980	708		−6.6%
1990	824		16.4%
2000	726		−11.9%
2010	789		8.7%
2020	763		−3.3%
U.S. Decennial Census

=== 2010 census ===
As of the census of 2010, there were 789 people, 297 households, and 209 families living in the village. The population density was 646.7 inhabitants per square mile (249.7/km^{2}). There were 325 housing units at an average density of 266.4 per square mile (102.9/km^{2}). The racial makeup of the village was 95.4% White, 0.4% African American, 0.3% Asian, 1.1% from other races, and 2.8% from two or more races. Hispanic or Latino of any race were 4.1% of the population.

There were 297 households, of which 35.7% had children under the age of 18 living with them, 53.5% were married couples living together, 10.1% had a female householder with no husband present, 6.7% had a male householder with no wife present, and 29.6% were non-families. 23.9% of all households were made up of individuals, and 9.8% had someone living alone who was 65 years of age or older. The average household size was 2.66 and the average family size was 3.08.

The median age in the village was 37.8 years. 25.7% of residents were under the age of 18; 7.3% were between the ages of 18 and 24; 26.2% were from 25 to 44; 29.8% were from 45 to 64; and 11.3% were 65 years of age or older. The gender makeup of the village was 52.3% male and 47.7% female.

=== 2000 census ===
As of the census of 2000, there were 726 people, 296 households, and 200 families living in the village. The population density was 596.7 inhabitants per square mile (230.4/km^{2}). There were 311 housing units at an average density of 255.6 per square mile (98.7/km^{2}). The racial makeup of the village was 95.73% White, 0.41% African American, 0.69% Native American, 0.14% Asian, 0.00% Pacific Islander, 0.83% from other races, and 2.20% from two or more races. 2.07% of the population were Hispanic or Latino of any race.

There were 296 households, out of which 31.4% had children under the age of 18 living with them, 49.3% were married couples living together, 12.8% had a female householder with no husband present, and 32.1% were non-families. 27.0% of all households were made up of individuals, and 10.5% had someone living alone who was 65 years of age or older. The average household size was 2.45 and the average family size was 2.94.

In the village, the population was spread out, with 25.5% under the age of 18, 7.6% from 18 to 24, 30.4% from 25 to 44, 24.4% from 45 to 64, and 12.1% who were 65 years of age or older. The median age was 37 years. For every 100 females, there were 103.4 males. For every 100 females age 18 and over, there were 99.6 males.

The median income for a household in the village was $39,191, and the median income for a family was $48,333. Males had a median income of $31,167 versus $23,864 for females. The per capita income for the village was $18,629. 9.0% of the population and 5.3% of families were below the poverty line. Out of the total population, 12.4% of those under the age of 18 and 0.0% of those 65 and older were living below the poverty line.
