= Ionia, Michigan =

Largest city and the county seat of Ionia County, Michigan, United States

- City
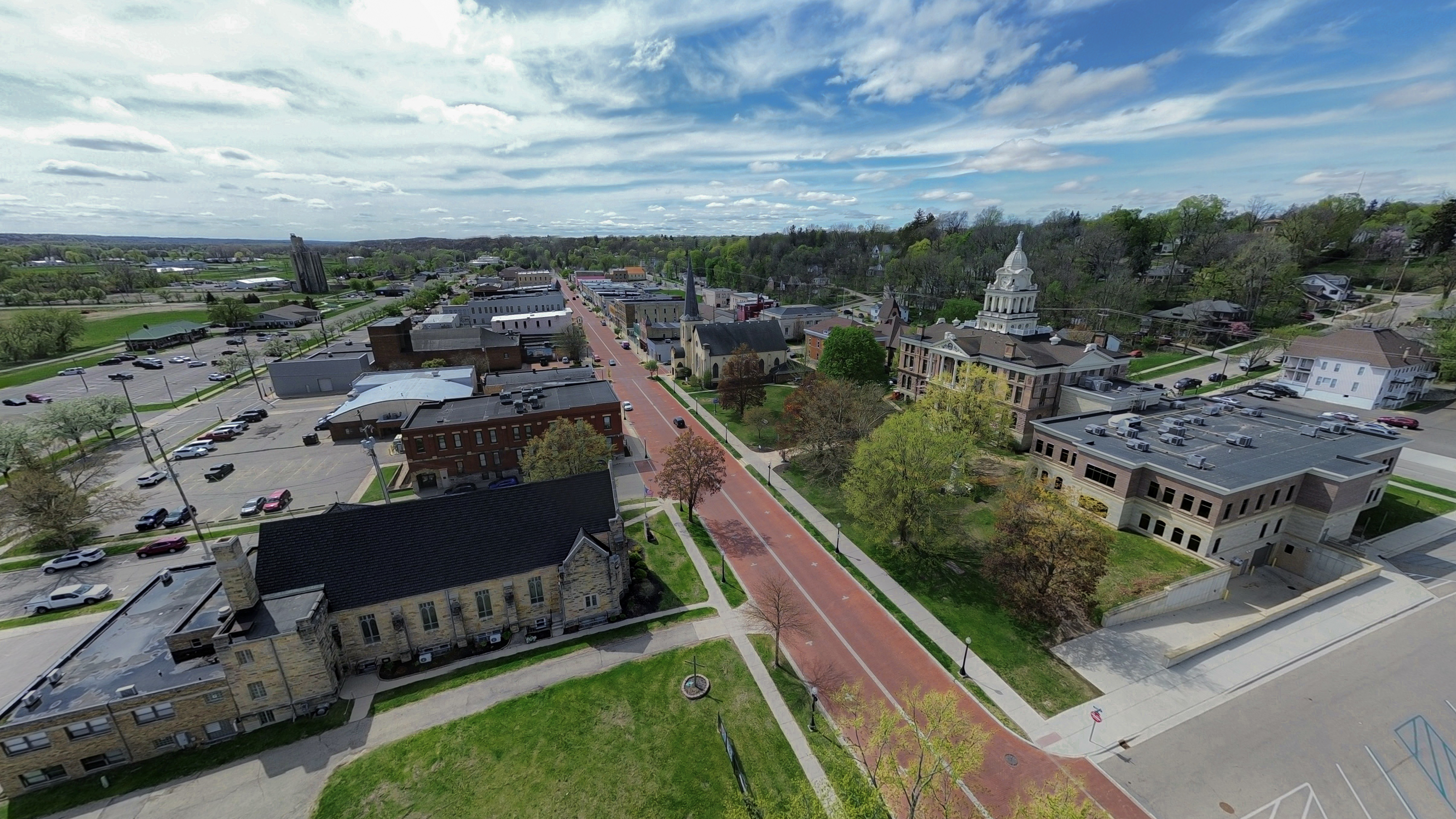
- Aerial view of Ionia, Michigan in 2025
- Interactive map of Ionia, Michigan
- Location within Michigan Location within the United States
- Coordinates: 42.976821°N 85.074633°W
- Country: United States
- State: Michigan
- County: Ionia
- Settled: May 1833
- Platted: 1841
- Incorporated as a village: 1865
- Organized into a city: 1873

Government
  - Mayor: John R. Milewski, II

Area
  - Total: 5.542 sq mi (14.354 km^{2})
  - Land: 5.412 sq mi (14.016 km^{2})
  - Water: 0.131 sq mi (0.340 km^{2}) 2.36%
- Elevation: 633 ft (193 m)

Population (2020)
  - Total: 13,378
  - Estimate (2024): 12,265
  - Density: 2,472.1/sq mi (954.48/km^{2})
- Time zone: UTC−5 (Eastern (EST))
  - Summer (DST): UTC−4 (EDT)
- ZIP Code: 48846
- Area code: 616
- FIPS code: 26-40860
- GNIS feature ID: 1626521
- Website: cityofionia.org

Ionia (/aɪˈoʊnjə/ eye-OH-nyə) is the largest city in and the county seat of Ionia County, Michigan, United States. The population was 13,378 at the 2020 census, and was estimated at 12,265 in 2024. Every July it hosts what is said to be the world's largest free-admission fair, the Ionia Free Fair. The city is mostly within Ionia Township, with small portion extending into Easton Township and Berlin Township, but is politically autonomous of the townships. The city is named after Ionia, a historic region in Greece.

== History ==
Before Euro-American migration, this was the location of an Odawa village. The leader of the Odawa here was Cobmoosa. His people planted crops here in 1833 but when Dexter and his associates arrived, they sold these crops to Dexter and relocated to the Flat River. In the 1850s, they were relocated to Oceana County.

- First Euro-American settlers in May 1833 by settlers from New York led by Samuel Dexter Jr.
- Platted in 1841
- Incorporated as a village in 1865
- Organized into a city in 1873

== Geography ==
According to the United States Census Bureau, the town has a total area of 5.542 square miles (14.35 km^{2}), of which 5.411 square miles (14.01 km^{2}) is land and 0.131 square miles (0.34 km^{2}) (2.36%) is water. Ionia is between Michigan's capital, Lansing, and its second largest city, Grand Rapids.

=== Climate ===
This climatic region is typified by large seasonal temperature differences, with warm to hot (and often humid) summers and cold (sometimes severely cold) winters. This region is also prone to dense and heavy fog, along with flooding (sometimes very damaging) due to the Grand River that flows through the city, during the spring. According to the Köppen Climate Classification system, Ionia has a humid continental climate, abbreviated "Dfb" on climate maps.

== Demographics ==
Historical population
Census	Pop.	Note	%±
1850	774		—
1860	1,170		51.2%
1870	2,500		113.7%
1880	4,190		67.6%
1890	4,482		7.0%
1900	5,209		16.2%
1910	5,030		−3.4%
1920	6,935		37.9%
1930	6,562		−5.4%
1940	6,392		−2.6%
1950	6,412		0.3%
1960	6,754		5.3%
1970	6,361		−5.8%
1980	5,920		−6.9%
1990	5,935		0.3%
2000	10,569		78.1%
2010	11,394		7.8%
2020	13,378		17.4%
2024 (est.)	12,265		−8.3%
U.S. Decennial Census; 2020 Census

=== 2020 census ===
As of the 2020 census, Ionia had a population of 13,378. The median age was 36.3 years. 13.9% of residents were under the age of 18 and 8.4% of residents were 65 years of age or older. For every 100 females there were 294.6 males, and for every 100 females age 18 and over there were 365.9 males age 18 and over.

98.2% of residents lived in urban areas, while 1.8% lived in rural areas.

There were 2,566 households in Ionia, of which 34.7% had children under the age of 18 living in them. Of all households, 35.3% were married-couple households, 21.7% were households with a male householder and no spouse or partner present, and 31.3% were households with a female householder and no spouse or partner present. About 32.2% of all households were made up of individuals and 12.4% had someone living alone who was 65 years of age or older.

There were 2,772 housing units, of which 7.4% were vacant. The homeowner vacancy rate was 2.8% and the rental vacancy rate was 5.3%.

Racial composition as of the 2020 census
Race	Number	Percent
White	9,329	69.7%
Black or African American	3,012	22.5%
American Indian and Alaska Native	86	0.6%
Asian	44	0.3%
Native Hawaiian and Other Pacific Islander	4	0.0%
Some other race	252	1.9%
Two or more races	651	4.9%
Hispanic or Latino (of any race)	1,064	8.0%

=== 2010 census ===
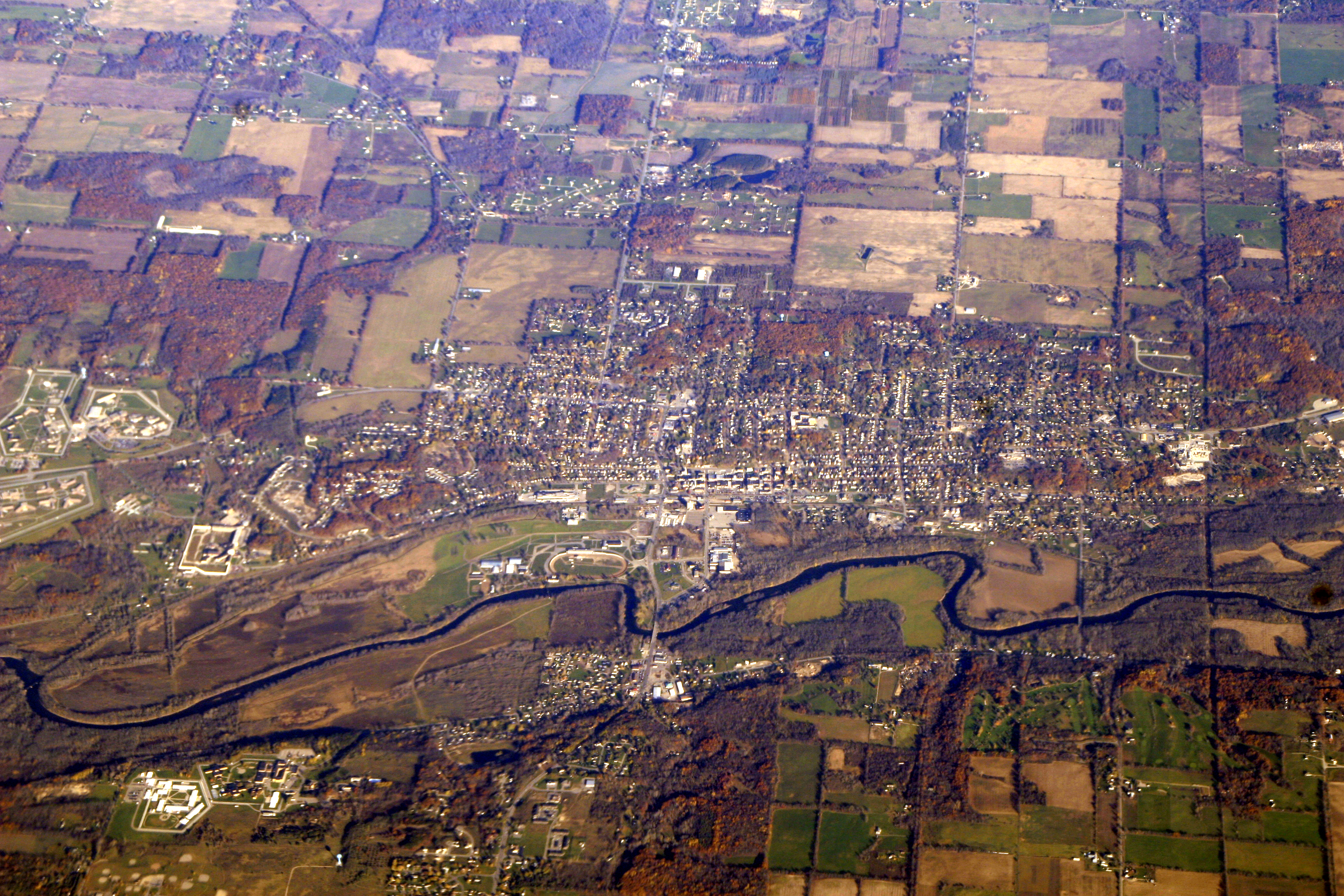
Aerial photo of Ionia taken November 2007

As of the 2010 census, there were 11,394 people, 2,428 households, and 1,520 families living in the city. The population density was 2,129.7 inhabitants per square mile (822.3/km^{2}). There were 2,775 housing units at an average density of 518.7 per square mile (200.3/km^{2}). The racial makeup of the city was 70.9% White, 25.0% African American, 0.7% Native American, 0.4% Asian, 1.6% from other races, and 1.4% from two or more races. Hispanic or Latino of any race were 7.7% of the population.

There were 2,428 households, of which 37.5% had children under the age of 18 living with them, 38.9% were married couples living together, 17.8% had a female householder with no husband present, 5.9% had a male householder with no wife present, and 37.4% were non-families. 30.6% of all households were made up of individuals, and 10.5% had someone living alone who was 65 years of age or older. The average household size was 2.53 and the average family size was 3.12.

The median age in the city was 32.3 years. 15.7% of residents were under the age of 18; 16.7% were between the ages of 18 and 24; 39.4% were from 25 to 44; 21.8% were from 45 to 64; and 6.4% were 65 years of age or older. The gender makeup of the city was 71.1% male and 28.9% female.

5,230 of Ionia's 11,394 residents (45.9%) are institutionalized in the state's various correctional facilities in the city.

=== 2000 census ===
As of the 2000 census, there were 10,569 people, 2,421 households, and 1,534 families living in the city. The population density was 2,095.9 inhabitants per square mile (809.2/km^{2}). There were 2,621 housing units at an average density of 519.8 per square mile (200.7/km^{2}). The racial makeup of the city was 71.08% White, 21.94% African American, 1.05% Native American, 0.65% Asian, 2.13% from other races, and 3.15% from two or more races. Hispanic or Latino of any race were 5.08% of the population.

There were 2,421 households, out of which 37.2% had children under the age of 18 living with them, 43.6% were married couples living together, 15.0% had a female householder with no husband present, and 36.6% were non-families. 30.7% of all households were made up of individuals, and 11.5% had someone living alone who was 65 years of age or older. The average household size was 2.53 and the average family size was 3.16.

In the city, the population was spread out, with 18.5% under the age of 18, 26.8% from 18 to 24, 34.1% from 25 to 44, 13.5% from 45 to 64, and 7.2% who were 65 years of age or older. The median age was 26 years. For every 100 females, there were 213.8 males. For every 100 females age 18 and over, there were 260.8 males.

The median income for a household in the city was $38,289, and the median income for a family was $45,794. Males had a median income of $30,373 versus $22,332 for females. The per capita income for the city was $12,157. About 13.3% of families and 15.8% of the population were below the poverty line, including 22.0% of those under age 18 and 7.5% of those age 65 or over.

== Economy ==
The Ionia Correctional Facilities are major employers in Ionia. They are to the west of downtown along Bluewater Highway and W Main Street, respectively.

== Government ==
The city levies an income tax of 1 percent on residents and 0.5 percent on nonresidents.

== Education ==
Almost all of Ionia is within Ionia Public Schools. A small piece is in Ionia Township School District 2, an elementary school district.

== Major highways ==
- M-21
- M-66

== Notable people ==
- Myron G. Barlow (1873–1937), internationally awarded painter
- Frances E. Burns (1866–1937), social leader and business woman
- Nick Bussell (b. 1983), a former Indy Pro Series race car driver
- Fred W. Green (1871–1936), 31st governor of Michigan from 1927 to 1931
- Elizabeth Lennox (1894–1992), contralto singer, born in Ionia
- Allen B. Morse (1837–1921), Michigan politician, jurist, and mayor of Ionia
- Billy Strings (b. 1992), Grammy-Award winning bluegrass musician, attended Ionia public school

== See also ==
- Independent Bank
