= Michigan's 86th House of Representatives district =

American legislative district

Michigan's 86th State House of Representatives district
Representative
Nancy De Boer; R–Holland
- Demographics: 66.9% White; 2.1% Black; 22.9% Hispanic; 4.6% Asian; 0.1% Native American; 0.3% Other; 3.2% Multiracial
- Population (2024): 92,346

Michigan's 86th House of Representatives district (also referred to as Michigan's 86th House district) is a legislative district within the Michigan House of Representatives in parts of Allegan and Ottawa counties. The district was created in 1965, when the Michigan House of Representatives district naming scheme changed from a county-based system to a numerical one.

== List of representatives ==
Representative	Party	Dates	Residence	Notes
Carl O. Little	Republican	1965–1968	Saginaw	
Bert C. Brennan	Republican	1969–1972	Saginaw	
Robert D. Young	Republican	1973–1974	Saginaw	
Donald J. Albosta	Democratic	1975–1976	St. Charles	
Lewis N. Dodak	Democratic	1977–1992	Birch Run	
Alan Cropsey	Republican	1993–1998	DeWitt	
Valde Garcia	Republican	1999–2001	St. Johns	Resigned to join the Michigan Senate.
Scott Hummel	Republican	2001–2002	DeWitt	
James L. Koetje	Republican	2003–2004	Walker	
Dave Hildenbrand	Republican	2005–2010	Lowell	
Lisa Lyons	Republican	2011–2016	Alto	
Thomas Albert	Republican	2017–2022	Lowell	Lived in Belding until around 2019.
Nancy De Boer	Republican	2023–present	Holland	
Joseph McClusky	Democratic	(Note: Member-elect.)	Holland	

== Recent elections ==
=== 2020s ===
2026 Michigan House of Representatives election
Party	Candidate	Votes	%
Democratic	Joseph McClusky	22,737	51.71
Republican	Nancy DeBoer (incumbent)	21,236	48.29
Total votes		43,973	100
Democratic gain from Republican			

2024 Michigan House of Representatives election
Party	Candidate	Votes	%
Republican	Nancy DeBoer	27,711	56.1
Democratic	Abby Klomparens	21,685	43.9
Total votes		49,396	100
Republican hold			

2022 Michigan House of Representatives election
Party	Candidate	Votes	%
Republican	Nancy DeBoer	22,091	56.2
Democratic	Larry Jackson	17,222	43.8
Total votes		39,313	100
Republican hold			

2020 Michigan House of Representatives election
Party	Candidate	Votes	%
Republican	Thomas Albert	35,536	63.1
Democratic	Sue Hayes	20,750	36.9
Total votes		56,286	100
Republican hold			

2018 Michigan House of Representatives election
Party	Candidate	Votes	%
Republican	Thomas Albert	26,176	60.0
Democratic	Lauren Taylor	16,026	36.7
Independent	Sue Norman	1,425	3.3
Total votes		43,627	100
Republican hold			

2016 Michigan House of Representatives election
Party	Candidate	Votes	%
Republican	Thomas Albert	28,617	59.8
Democratic	Lynn Mason	16,516	34.5
Green	Cliff Yankovich	1,461	3.1
Libertarian	Bill Gelineau	1,265	2.6
Total votes		47,859	100
Republican hold			

2014 Michigan House of Representatives election
Party	Candidate	Votes	%
Republican	Lisa Posthumus Lyons	20,273	65.8
Democratic	Lynn Mason	10,518	34.2
Total votes		30,791	100
Republican hold			

2012 Michigan House of Representatives election
Party	Candidate	Votes	%
Republican	Lisa Posthumus Lyons	30,715	70.2
Democratic	Brian Bosak	13,021	29.8
Total votes		43,736	100
Republican hold			

2010 Michigan House of Representatives election
Party	Candidate	Votes	%
Republican	Lisa Posthumus Lyons	25,943	70.2
Democratic	Frank Hammond	10,996	29.8
Total votes		36,939	100
Republican hold			

2008 Michigan House of Representatives election
Party	Candidate	Votes	%
Republican	Dave Hildenbrand	34,004	64.5
Democratic	Melissa Casalina	17,135	32.5
Libertarian	Patricia Steinport	1,565	3.0
Total votes		52,704	100
Republican hold			

== Historical district boundaries ==
Map	Description	Apportionment Plan	Notes
	Saginaw County (part): Buena Vista Township; Carrollton Township; Kochville Township; Saginaw (part); Saginaw Township; Thomas Township; Tittabawassee Township; Zilwaukee; Zilwaukee Township	1964 Apportionment Plan	
	Bay County (part): Hampton Township; Merritt Township; Portsmouth Township; Saginaw County (part): Albee Township; Birch Run Township; Blumfield Township; Bridgeport Township; Buena Vista Township; Carrollton Township; Saginaw (part); Saginaw Township (part); Spaulding Township; St. Charles Township; Taymouth Township; Zilwaukee; Zilwaukee Township	1972 Apportionment Plan	
	Bay County (part): Bangor Township; Hampton Township; Merritt Township; Saginaw County (part): Albee Township; Birch Run Township; Blumfield Township; Bridgeport Township; Buena Vista Township; Frankenmuth; Frankenmuth Township; Maple Grove Township; Spaulding Township; Taymouth Township; Zilwaukee; Zilwaukee Township	1982 Apportionment Plan	
	Clinton County (part): Bath Township; Bengal Township; Bingham Township; Dallas Township; DeWitt; DeWitt Township; Eagle Township; Essex Township; Greenbush Township; Lebanon Township; Olive Township; Riley Township; St. Johns; Watertown Township; Westphalia Township; Ionia County (part): Danby Township; Ionia (part); Ionia Township; Lyons Township; North Plains Township; Orange Township; Orleans Township; Portland; Portland Township; Ronald Township; Sebewa Township	1992 Apportionment Plan	
	Kent County (part): Ada Township; Bowne Township; East Grand Rapids; Grand Rapids (part); Grand Rapids Township; Grattan Township; Lowell; Lowell Township; Vergennes Township; Walker	2001 Apportionment Plan	
	Ionia County (part): Belding; Berlin Township (part); Easton Township; Ionia; Ionia Township; Orleans Township; Otisco Township; Kent County (part): Ada Township; Bowne Township; Caledonia Township; Cascade Township; Grattan Township; Lowell; Lowell Township; Vergennes Township	2011 Apportionment Plan	
