= Ionia Public Schools =

School district in Michigan

Address
- 250 East Tuttle Road Ionia, Ionia County, Michigan, 48846; United States

District information
- Motto: A community dedicated to the pursuit of excellence.
- Grades: Pre-Kindergarten-12
- Superintendent: Ben Gurk
- Schools: 8
- Budget: $42,519,000 2022-2023 expenditures
- NCES District ID: 2619250

Students and staff
- Students: 2,675 (2024-2025)
- Teachers: 143.5 (on an FTE basis) (2024-2025)
- Staff: 361.37 FTE (2024-2025)
- Student–teacher ratio: 18.64 (2024-2025)

Other information
- Website: www.ioniaschools.org

Ionia Public Schools is a public school district in Ionia County, Michigan. It serves almost all of Ionia, all of Lyons and Muir, and parts of the townships of Berlin, Easton, Ionia, Lyons, North Plains, Orange, Orleans, and Ronald.

== History ==
By 1837, a schoolhouse had been established in Ionia. A union school district was established in 1863 and it built Central School in 1866. The first high school class graduated from Central School 1871. In 1894, the football team was established.

In 1958, the district organized a service for homebound disabled students to receive instruction via telephone.

The present Ionia High School was built in 1989. It replaced a high school building (presently the district's middle school) built in 1938. It was designed by architect Roger Allen and paid for by the Works Progress Administration. It received additions in 1948, 1953, and 1956 and as of 1958, it housed junior high grades and an elementary school.

== Schools ==
Schools in Ionia Public Schools district
School	Address	Notes
R. B. Boyce Elementary	3550 North State Road, Ionia	Grades PreK-5
Emerson School	645 Hackett Street, Ionia	Grades PreK-5
Jefferson School	420 North Jefferson Street, Ionia	Grades PreK-5
Rather Elementary	380 East Tuttle Road, Ionia	Grades PreK-5
Twin Rivers Elementary	435 Lou Lemke Lane, Ionia	Grades PreK-5
Ionia Middle School	436 Union Street, Ionia	Grades 6-8. Built 1938.
Ionia High School	250 East Tuttle Road, Ionia	Grades 9-12. Built 1989.
Douglas R. Welch High School	250 East Tuttle Road, Ionia	Alternative high school within Ionia High School. Grades 9-12.
