= Saranac Community Schools =

School district in Michigan

Address
- 225 S. Pleasant St. Saranac, Ionia County, Michigan, 48881; United States

District information
- Grades: PreKindergarten–12
- Superintendent: Jason Smith
- Schools: 2
- Budget: $12,777,000 2022-2023 expenditures
- NCES District ID: 2630930

Students and staff
- Students: 850 (2024-2025)
- Teachers: 49.86 (on an FTE basis) (2024-2025)
- Staff: 118.17 FTE (2024-2025)
- Student–teacher ratio: 17.05 (2024-2025)

Other information
- Website: www.saranac.k12.mi.us

Saranac Community Schools is a public school district in Ionia County, in West Michigan. It serves Saranac and parts of the townships of Berlin, Boston, Campbell, Easton, and Keene.

== History ==
One of the district's former schools was Saranac Public School at 28 Vosper Street. Built around 1930, it replaced a nearly 75-year-old school building that was demolished in May 1930 prior to construction. The 1930 building closed with the opening of a new elementary facility in fall 1991.

In 1950, a new elementary school was dedicated, after which the 1930 building was used for upper grades. East of the elementary school, across a sports field, the current high school opened in fall 1964.

Harker Middle School, housed in the 1950 elementary building since 1991, closed in 2012.

== Schools ==
Schools in Saranac Community Schools district
School	Address	Notes
Saranac Junior/Senior High School	150 Pleasant Street, Saranac	Grades 7–12. Built 1964.
Saranac Elementary	250 Pleasant Street, Saranac	Grades PreK-6. Built 1991.
