= Belding Area Schools =

School district in Michigan

Address
- 850 Hall Street Belding, Ionia, Michigan, 48809; United States

District information
- Grades: Pre-Kindergarten-12
- Superintendent: Brent R. Noskey
- Schools: 4
- Budget: $26,810,000 2021-2022 expenditures
- NCES District ID: 2604530

Students and staff
- Students: 1,621 (2023-2024)
- Teachers: 103.7 (on an FTE basis) (2023-2024)
- Staff: 229.66 FTE (2023-2024)
- Student–teacher ratio: 15.63 (2023-2024)

Other information
- Website: www.bas-k12.org

Belding Area Schools is a public school district in Ionia County, Michigan. It serves Belding and parts of the townships of Easton, Keene, Orleans, and Otisco. It also serves parts of the townships of Eureka and Fairplain in Montcalm County and Grattan and Oakfield in Kent County.

== History ==
The site of Belding Middle School has served as a school since 1880. Prior to 1976, it was the district's middle and high school. The 1880 building received additions in 1890, 1912, 1922, 1929, 1950, and 1960. When the current high school opened, the former high school became a stand-alone middle school. Five classrooms, the band room, gymnasium and cafeteria were spared when most of the building was torn down and reconstructed, reopening in fall 1993.

Belding High School graduated its first class, six girls, in 1883. By 1902, 20 students graduated, although they had to choose an academic major and minor. They could chose English, Latin, German, and science. In 1915, students established a women's suffrage club.

The current high school opened in spring 1976. Renovations and additions were made at the high school between 2011 and 2013.

Previously the district used the "Redskins" as the mascot. Wes Cummings, who served as the athletic director at Belding, stated that Belding's athletic rivals often made derogatory references to killing Native Americans during sports games. In December 2016 the school board voted to remove the "Redskins" as the school district mascot. The district had been using the letter "B" as their symbol for several years prior to 2016 as a transition away from their mascot. In March 2017, the district chose the Black Knights as the new mascot after it beat the Bengals and Bruins in student votes. The Black Knight, stated high school principal Michael Ostrander, is a symbol of "honor, loyalty and courage."

== Schools ==
Schools in Belding Area Schools district
| School | Address | Notes |
|---|---|---|
| Belding High School | 850 Hall Street, Belding | Grades 9–12. Built 1976. |
| Belding Middle School | 410 Ionia Street, Belding | Grades 6–8 |
| Woodview Elementary School | 450 Orchard Street, Belding | Grades 3–5 |
| Ellis Elementary | 100 W. Ellis Street, Belding | Grades K–2 |
| Early Childhood Center | 100 W. Ellis Street, Belding | Preschool programs within Ellis Elementary building |
| Community and Adult Education | 755 Orchard Street, Belding | Programs include GED preparation, high school completion, English as a second language |

== See also ==
- Native American mascot controversy
