= Lakewood Public Schools =

School district in Michigan

Address
- 223 W. Broadway Street Woodland, Barry County, Michigan, 48897; United States

District information
- Grades: Pre-Kindergarten-12
- Superintendent: Jodi Duits
- Schools: 4
- Budget: $23,622,000 2022-2023 expenditures
- NCES District ID: 2620980

Students and staff
- Students: 1,595 (2024-2025)
- Teachers: 81.07 (on an FTE basis) (2024-2025)
- Staff: 185.75 FTE (2024-2025)
- Student–teacher ratio: 19.67 (2024-2025)

Other information
- Website: www.lakewoodps.org

Lakewood Public Schools is a public school district in West Michigan.

== Geographic Area ==
In Barry County, Lakewood Public Schools serves Woodland and parts of the townships of Carlton, Castleton, and Woodland. In Eaton County, it serves Sunfield and parts of the townships of Chester, Roxand, Sunfield, and Vermontville. In Ionia County it serves Clarksville, Lake Odessa, Odessa Township, and parts of the townships of Berlin, Boston, Campbell, Orange, and Sebewa. In Kent County, it serves a small area of Bowne Township.

== History ==
Prior to 1961, the geographic area of the current Lakewood Public Schools consisted of four independent districts: Clarksville, Lake Odessa, Sunfield, and Woodland. Facing overcrowding, Lake Odessa and Woodland districts merged in early 1961, forming Lakewood Public Schools. The first school year of the new district began in fall 1961, when Lake Odessa High School became a ninth grade campus and grades ten through twelve used the former Woodland High School. Clarksville merged with Lakewood that November, followed by Sunfield in 1962. By spring 1962, although Woodland and Lake Odessa were combined, they still had separate sports teams.

In 1962, construction began on a new single high school that would serve the consolidated district. Lake Odessa and Woodland high schools would become junior high buildings. The first class to combine all high school seniors in the new district graduated in spring 1964. Lakewood High School opened in fall 1964.

A crisis of overcrowding beset the district in the 1990s, as schools buildings became antiquated. Sunfield Elementary, built in 1893, was still in use. The Lake Odessa Junior High, built in 1923, had been closed in 1992 due to obsolescence, and all junior high students in the district were using Woodland school. The elementary students who were previously using the Woodland school, also built in 1923, had been moved to portable classrooms. The 1916 Clarksville school's upper floors had been closed off for being dangerous. A sixth request to voters for a bond issue approval failed in 1994, and a seventh failed in 1995.

Funding for three elementary school renovations and a new middle school was approved by voters in September 1996, as well as the demolition of the vacant former Lake Odessa High School/Junior High building. At the time, the district had five elementary schools.

Several elementary schools in the district have closed due to declining enrollment, with 2,801 students in 1994 and 1,623 in 2023. The old Woodland High School remains as the Lakewood Early Childhood Center and district administration building.

== Schools ==
Schools in Lakewood Public Schools district
School	Address	Notes
Lakewood High School	7223 Velte Road, Lake Odessa	Grades 9–12; built 1964
Lakewood Middle School	8699 E. Brown Road, Woodland	Grades 6–8
Lakewood Elementary	812 Washington Blvd, Lake Odessa	Grades K–5
Lakewood Early Childhood Center	223 West Broadway, Woodland	Preschool
