= M-44 (Michigan highway) =

State highway in Michigan, United States

M-44
- M-44 highlighted in red and Conn. M-44 highlighted in green

Route information
- Maintained by MDOT
- Length: 37.463 mi (60.291 km)
- Existed: c. July 1, 1919–present

Major junctions
- West end: M-11 in Kentwood
- M-21 near East Grand Rapids; I-96 in Grand Rapids
- East end: M-66 near Ionia

Location
- Country: United States
- State: Michigan
- Counties: Kent, Ionia

Highway system
- Michigan State Trunkline Highway System; Interstate; US; State; Byways
← M-43	→ US 45

M-44 is a 37.463-mile (60.291 km) state trunkline highway in the western region of the US state of Michigan. It runs northward from the intersection of M-11 (28th Street) and M-37 toward the Rockford area. The highway then turns eastward to Belding, and it ends six miles (10 km) north of Ionia at M-66. M-44 is known in Grand Rapids as the "East Beltline" and intersects with its related highway, Connector M-44, in Plainfield Township. This highway runs concurrently with M-37 between M-11 and Interstate 96 (I-96).

As a state highway, M-44 dates back to around July 1, 1919, and it was routed along a section of its modern route at that time. The eastern end was altered in the late 1920s, and the western end was extended to the Grand Rapids area in the 1970s. For over 20 years, M-44 was truncated to remove the M-37 concurrency. Since 2003 though, the highway has terminated at the intersection with 28th Street.

== Route description ==
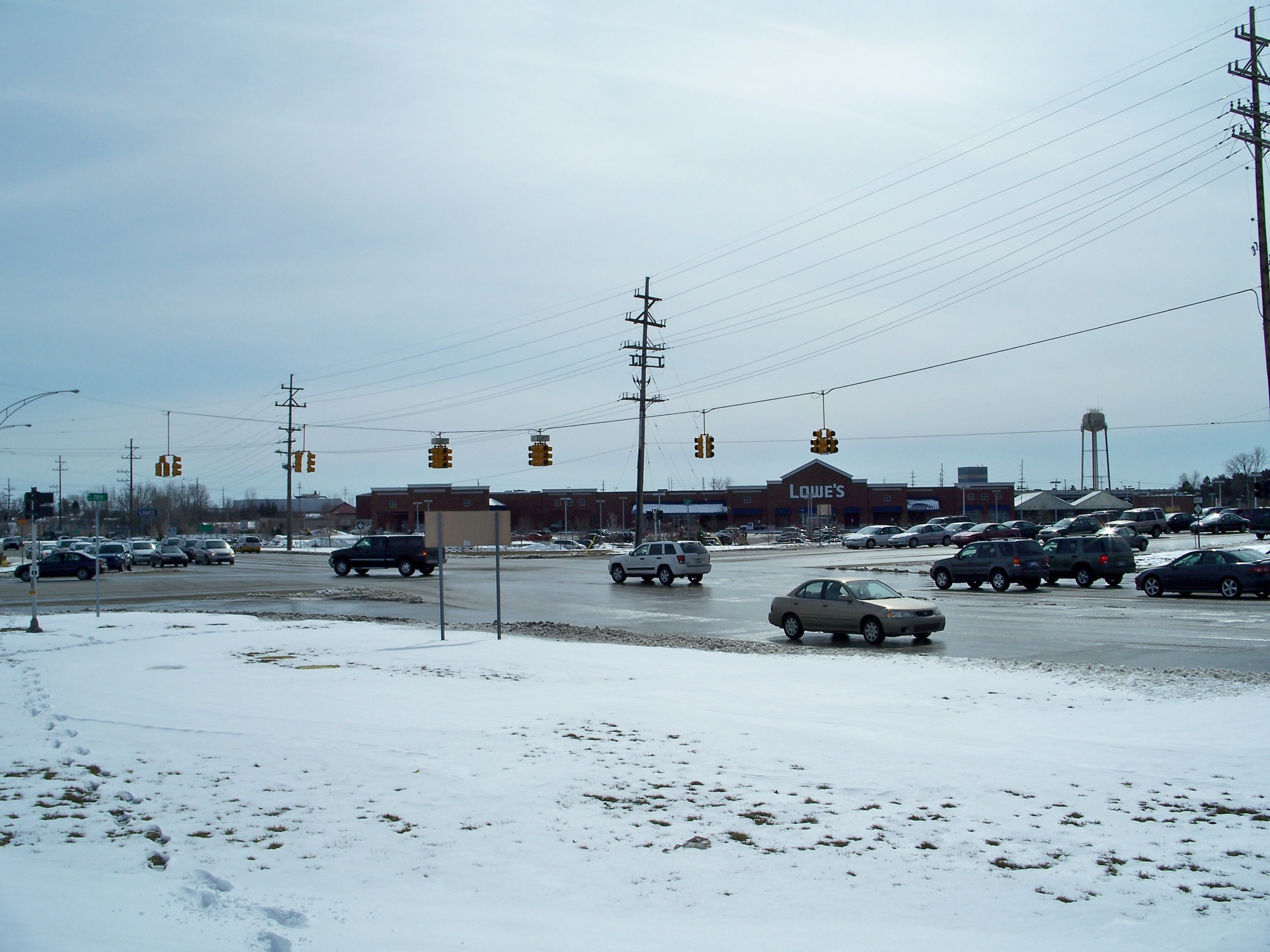
Western terminus of M-44 at the corner of 28th Street and East Beltline Avenue

M-44 starts at the intersection of 28th Street and East Beltline Avenue in Kentwood. M-11 runs east and west along 28th Street and M-37 runs south along Broadmoor Avenue as the continuation of East Beltline. M-44 and M-37 run together on East Beltline Avenue north from this intersection, which is also the location of the Woodland Mall in Kentwood. From here north, M-37/M-44 runs along a four-lane divided boulevard through the campus of Calvin College. East Beltline passes through suburban residential areas near the east end of Reeds Lake and M-21's western terminus at Fulton Street. Just north of this intersection is an interchange with I-96 at exit 38. M-37 leaves the roadway to run along I-96 while M-44 continues northward along East Beltline Avenue. All of M-44 to this point is listed on the National Highway System, a network of roadways important to the nation's economy, defense, and mobility.

North of the interchange, M-44 passes the Frederik Meijer Gardens and Sculpture Park and the campus of Cornerstone University. The area around the highway is mixed businesses and office parks north to Knapp Street, and then residential north of there. At Plainfield Avenue, M-44 meets Conn. M-44 and crosses the Grand River. M-44 turns eastward near the south side of Rockford and runs through suburban residential areas near Lake Bella Vista, Silver and Bostwick lakes. East of here, the environs transition to rural farmland and the highway crosses the Kent–Ionia county line between Grattan and Cooks Corners, where it meets M-91 west of Belding. The highway continues east through town, where it crosses the Flat River, and ends at M-66 north of Ionia.

== History ==
M-44 was first designated by July 1, 1919, beginning at M-13 (later US Highway 131 or US 131) from Rockford to Belding. Near Orleans, M-44 turned south into town and ended at M-21 in Ionia. The segment near Orleans was realigned to end at M-14 (now M-66) in Woods Corners in 1929. M-44 was extended concurrently along US 131 to end at the intersection of the East Beltline and 28th Street near Grand Rapids. Two other highways were also routed on the East Beltline: M-21 south of Fulton Street and M-37 south of Cascade Road. The US 131, M-21 and M-37 concurrencies only lasted until 1964 when M-21 was moved to I-196 and M-37 was shifted to the new US 131 freeway.

US 131 was moved to its freeway north of Grand Rapids in 1969. The Northland Drive segment of US 131/M-44 was redesignated as only M-44, and the Plainfield Avenue segment became Conn. M-44. M-37 was rerouted as well up East Beltline from M-11 concurrently with M-44 to I-96. In 1977, this junction at I-96 became the official western terminus of M-44, with the M-44 signs along East Beltline Avenue removed. Then in 2003, the signs along the East Beltline were restored and the route extended back to its former terminus.

== Major intersections ==
County	Location	mi	km	Destinations	Notes
Kent	Kentwood	0.000	0.000	M-11 (28th Street) M-37 south (Broadmoor Avenue)	M-44 runs concurrently with M-37 north along East Beltline Avenue
Kent	Grand Rapids Township	3.522	5.668	M-21 (Fulton Street) – Lowell	Western terminus of M-21
Kent	Grand Rapids	4.209– 4.231	6.774– 6.809	I-96 / M-37 north – Muskegon, Lansing	M-37 concurrency ends at exit 38 on I-96
Kent	Plainfield Township	10.065	16.198	Conn. M-44 west (Plainfield Avenue)	Eastern terminus of Conn. M-44
Kent	Plainfield Township	12.873	20.717	Northland Drive – Rockford	Old US 131
Ionia	Otisco Township	27.855	44.828	M-91 north – Greenville	Southern terminus of M-91
Ionia	Orleans Township – Ronald Township	37.463	60.291	M-66 – Ionia, Stanton	
1.000 mi = 1.609 km; 1.000 km = 0.621 mi: Concurrency terminus

== Connector route ==
Connector M-44
- Location: Kent County
- Length: 4.185 mi (6.735 km)
- Existed: 1969–present

M-44 Connector, or Conn. M-44, is a 4.185-mile (6.735 km) connector route state trunkline highway running along Plainfield Avenue in the Grand Rapids area. It connects I-96/M-37 near Lamberton Lake with M-44 running along East Beltline Avenue near the Grand River. In between, the highway passes through a commercial area. North of 5 Mile Road, Plainfield Avenue takes on a more suburban residential character. There are more business again at the northern end by Versluis Lake. Conn. M-44 was formed in 1969 when the US 131 freeway was completed from I-96/M-37 to 14 Mile Road near Rockford. US 131 along Plainfield Avenue was redesignated as Conn. M-44 to connect I-96/M-37 with M-44.
