= Parnell, Michigan =

- Unincorporated community
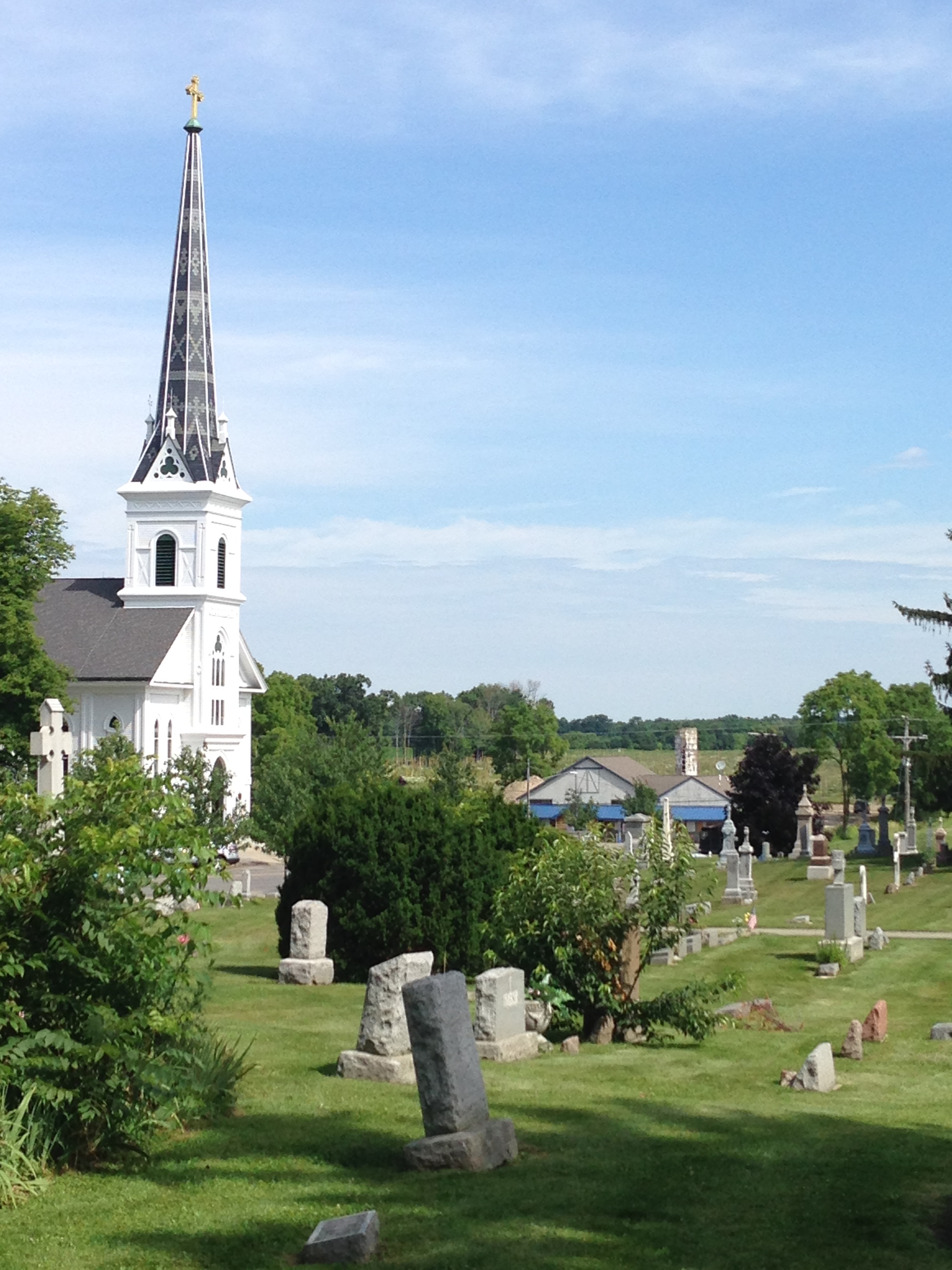
- St Patrick's Catholic Church in Parnell

- Location within the state of Michigan Location within the United States
- Coordinates: 43°02′36″N 85°24′41″W
- Country: United States
- State: Michigan
- County: Kent
- Township: Grattan
- Elevation: 833 ft (254 m)
- Time zone: UTC-5 (Eastern (EST))
  - Summer (DST): UTC-4 (EDT)
- ZIP code(s): 49301 (Ada)
- Area code: 616
- GNIS feature ID: 1617772

Parnell is an unincorporated community in Grattan Township, Kent County, Michigan, United States. Its latitude is 43.043 and its longitude is -85.411.

== History ==
The area in which it is currently located was once the home of the Ottawa people. After the 1836 Treaty of Washington opened up the land for European settlement, the former inhabitants were quickly replaced by Europeans. In the late 1830s and '40s, Irish immigrants settled the area, which had the advantages of prime farmland and a location reasonably close to a metropolitan center, Grand Rapids, Michigan. By 1844, it is estimated that 20-30 Irish families were settled in the area now known as Parnell. That year, the community came together to worship with a priest sent from Grand Rapids, most frequently in the home of Michael Farrell. By the end of the year, planning for St. Patrick's Catholic Church had begun. The current structure, dating from 1878, is located across the street from the original church. The steeple of the church was renovated in 2005.

Saint Patrick School in Parnell was founded by Catholic priest James Crumley in 1893, and moved into its current building in 1963. The school serves children from preschool through 8th grade.

Parnell is also the home of a monastery of Discalced Carmelite nuns, founded in 1916.

== Education ==
Lowell Area Schools operates area public schools. Murray Lake Elementary School serves Parnell, while Lowell Middle School and Lowell High School serve the entire district.
