= Bowne Township, Michigan =

- Civil township
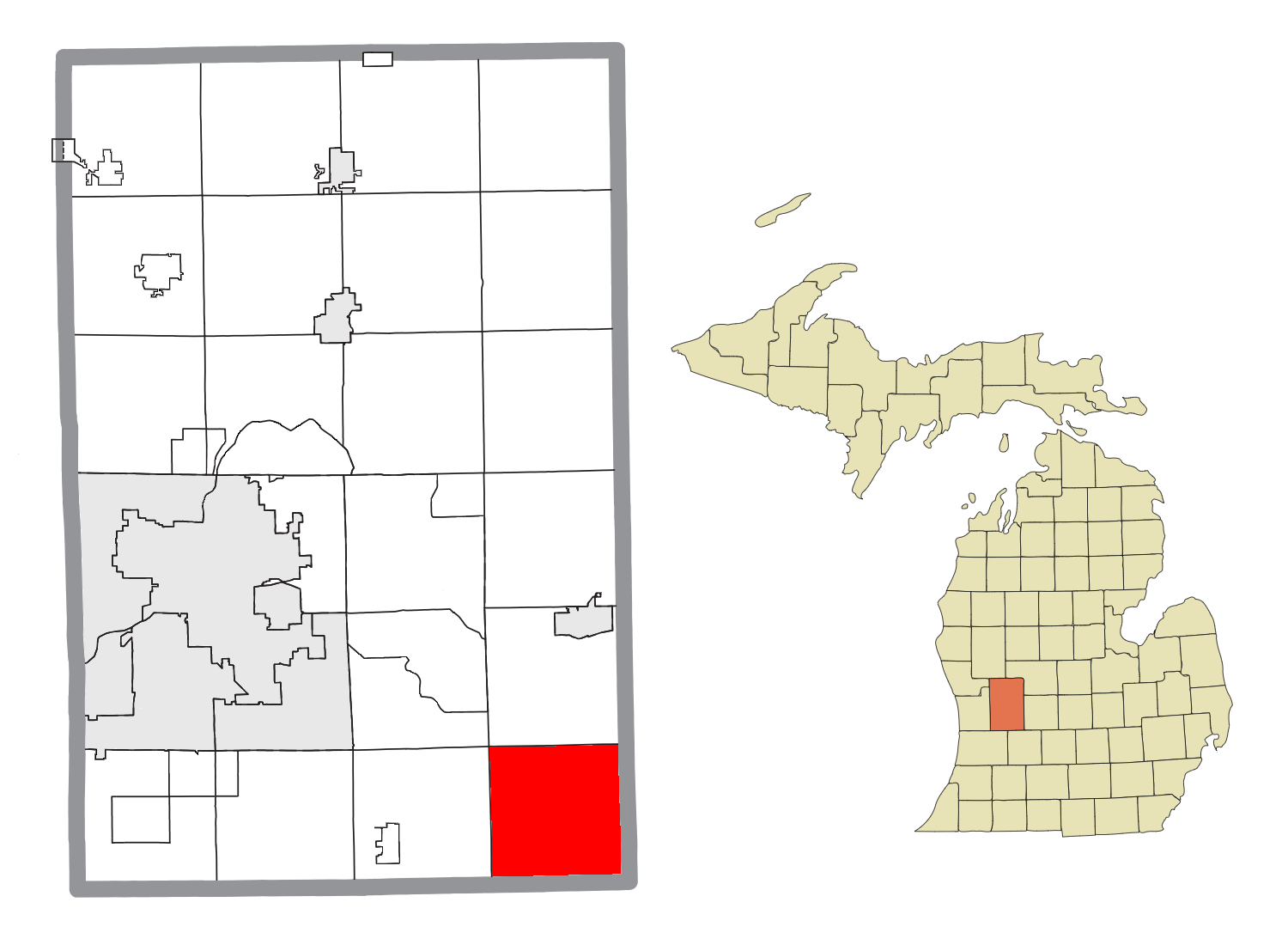
- Location within Kent County

- Location within the state of Michigan Location within the United States
- Coordinates: 42°49′25″N 85°21′35″W
- Country: United States
- State: Michigan
- County: Kent
- Established: 1848

Government
  - Supervisor: Randy Wilcox
  - Clerk: Sandra Kowalczyk

Area
  - Total: 36.03 sq mi (93.32 km^{2})
  - Land: 35.53 sq mi (92.02 km^{2})
  - Water: 0.50 sq mi (1.29 km^{2})
- Elevation: 810 ft (247 m)

Population (2020)
  - Total: 3,289
  - Density: 92.57/sq mi (35.74/km^{2})
- Time zone: UTC-5 (Eastern (EST))
  - Summer (DST): UTC-4 (EDT)
- ZIP code(s): 49302 (Alto); 49316 (Dutton); 49325 (Freeport)
- Area code: 616
- FIPS code: 26-081-09780
- GNIS feature ID: 1625964
- Website: Official website

Bowne Township is a civil township of Kent County in the U.S. state of Michigan. As of the 2020 census, the township population was 3,289.

The township was organized as a survey township in 1848. It is part of the Grand Rapids metropolitan area and is located about 20 miles (32 km) southeast of the city of Grand Rapids.

== Communities ==
- Alto is an unincorporated community located along the northern border of the township.
- Bowne was a community within the township and had a post office from 1850 until 1868.
- Bowne Center was a village founded in 1838.
- Logan was an unincorporated community in the township. In May 1881, it was given a post office named "Keller" for the storekeeper and first postmaster, Christian Keller. It was renamed "Logan" in September 1884 and closed in October 1888. It was restored from November 1899 to January 1906.

== Geography ==
According to the U.S. Census Bureau, Bowne Township has a total area of 36.03 square miles (93.32 km^{2}), of which 35.53 square miles (92.02 km^{2}) is land and 0.50 square miles (1.29 km^{2}) (1.39%) is water.

The township is in the southeastern corner of Kent County. It is bordered to the west by Caledonia Charter Township, to the north by Lowell Charter Township, to the east by Campbell Township in Ionia County, and to the south by Irving Township and the village of Freeport in Barry County.

=== Major highways ===
- M-50 enters the township from the east under the local name 92nd Street SE, in which it then turns north and is known as Alden Nash Avenue SE.

== Education ==
Bowne Township is served by four different public school districts. The majority of the township is served by Lowell Area Schools, while the western and southern portions are served by Caledonia Community Schools. A very small portion of the southeastern portion of the township are served by Thornapple Kellogg School District and Lakewood Public Schools.

== History ==
Bowne Township was formed in 1849 from Caledonia Township, composing Township 5 North, Range 9 West. This area had previously been transferred from Vergennes Township to Caledonia Township in 1840.

== Demographics ==
As of the census of 2000, there were 2,743 people, 880 households, and 756 families residing in the township. The population density was 76.5 inhabitants per square mile (29.5/km^{2}). There were 906 housing units at an average density of 25.3 per square mile (9.8/km^{2}). The racial makeup of the township was 97.59% White, 0.18% African American, 0.51% Native American, 0.33% Asian, 0.07% Pacific Islander, 0.51% from other races, and 0.80% from two or more races. Hispanic or Latino of any race were 1.86% of the population.

There were 880 households, out of which 45.5% had children under the age of 18 living with them, 76.8% were married couples living together, 5.7% had a female householder with no husband present, and 14.0% were non-families. 10.8% of all households were made up of individuals, and 3.0% had someone living alone who was 65 years of age or older. The average household size was 3.11 and the average family size was 3.36.

In the township the population was spread out, with 32.4% under the age of 18, 6.2% from 18 to 24, 32.3% from 25 to 44, 22.2% from 45 to 64, and 6.9% who were 65 years of age or older. The median age was 34 years. For every 100 females, there were 104.9 males. For every 100 females age 18 and over, there were 103.2 males.

The median income for a household in the township was $60,909, and the median income for a family was $61,544. Males had a median income of $41,660 versus $30,478 for females. The per capita income for the township was $22,675. About 5.0% of families and 5.6% of the population were below the poverty line, including 6.4% of those under age 18 and 8.8% of those age 65 or over.
