= M-91 (Michigan highway) =

State highway in Ionia and Montcalm counties in Michigan, United States

M-91
- M-91 highlighted in red

Route information
- Maintained by MDOT
- Length: 24.464 mi (39.371 km)
- Existed: 1942–present

Major junctions
- South end: M-44 near Belding
- M-57 at Greenville
- North end: M-46 at Lakeview

Location
- Country: United States
- State: Michigan
- Counties: Ionia, Montcalm

Highway system
- Michigan State Trunkline Highway System; Interstate; US; State; Byways
← M-90	→ M-92

M-91 is a largely north–south state trunkline highway in the Lower Peninsula of the US state of Michigan. It runs from Belding to south of Lakeview. Its 24-mile (39 km) length exists entirely within Ionia and Montcalm counties. It is all undivided surface route. Aside from the two Michigan state highways that are its termini, it has only one other intersection with any Michigan state highway, and that is with M-57 in Greenville.

M-91 was formed when M-66 was rerouted in the 1940s. At the time, the highway continued south to Lowell, but subsequent transfers or roadway sections have truncated the route to its present form. For a time period in the 1980s, M-91 was even a discontinuous highway when a section in the middle was transferred to county control before the southernmost section was transferred.

== Route description ==
M-91 starts at an intersection with M-44 west of Belding in Otisco Township. The road runs north along Storey Road and past the Candlestone Golf Course and farmlands. At Bricker Road, M-91 crosses out of Ionia County into Montcalm County. The trunkline runs along Greenville Road and passes the Greenville Municipal Airport. As it continues north, the highway curves to the northeast running between the Flat River and Baldwin, Como and Manoka lakes. As it enters the south side of Greenville, M-91 runs along on Lafayette Street. In the center of Greenville, M-91 meets M-57 on Washington Street. North of downtown, M-91 crosses a bend in the Flat River and continues to parallel the river on the east out of town. In rural Montcalm County, M-91 is once again named Greenville Road and it curves to the west of Turk Lake and continues due north to the community of Langston. North of Langston are Tacoma, West and Spring lakes. Further north, M-91 curves to the northwest around Farnsworth Lake, resuming its due-north course a mile (1.6 km) to the west . Running through farmlands again, M-91 terminates at an intersection with M-46 in Lakeview, just south of Tamarack Lake.

== History ==
=== Previous designations ===
The first routing of M-91 in Michigan was located between Menominee and Cedar River in the Upper Peninsula. This routing was designated by July 1, 1919. The designation remained until sometime before December 1927 when it was replaced by M-35.

In 1927, all of the current M-91 was originally part of M-66. A second usage of M-91 was designated from Rogers City towards Cheboygan County along the Lake Huron shore by 1930. It became part of US 23 by the end of 1940.

=== Current designation ===
M-91 was designated for the third time by June 1942. The number was assigned between US 16 (Cascade Road/Grand River Avenue) south of Lowell running northeast along Alden Nash Avenue into Lowell and Lincoln Lake Road north of town. The highway followed Lincoln Lake Road to M-44 east of Belding and turned to run concurrently along M-44 to the Belding area. From there it ran north to Greenville and on to Lakeview along the present route. The last section of gravel roadway was paved in Ionia County in 1954.

The highway designation was extended south to the then-new US 16 freeway (now Interstate 96) around 1958. It was later truncated back to M-21 in Lowell in 1968. By 1980, the section of M-91 in Ionia County south of M-44 to the Kent County line was turned back to local control. The highway section in Kent County remained marked as M-91, resulting in a discontinuous highway. The southern section between Lowell and the county line was turned back by 1985, resulting in the modern routing of M-91.

== Major intersections ==
County	Location	mi	km	Destinations	Notes
Ionia	Otisco Township	0.000	0.000	M-44 (Belding Road) – Grand Rapids, Belding	
Montcalm	Greenville	6.321	10.173	M-57 (Washington Street) – Chesaning	
Montcalm	Lakeview	24.464	39.371	M-46 (Howard City–Edmore Road) – Howard City, St. Louis	
1.000 mi = 1.609 km; 1.000 km = 0.621 mi
