= Alto, Michigan =

- Unincorporated community
- Location within the state of Michigan Location within the United States
- Coordinates: 42°51′24″N 85°22′49″W
- Country: United States
- State: Michigan
- County: Kent
- Township: Bowne
- Elevation: 814 ft (248 m)
- Time zone: UTC-5 (Eastern (EST))
  - Summer (DST): UTC-4 (EDT)
- ZIP code(s): 49302
- Area code: 616
- GNIS feature ID: 620029

Alto is an unincorporated community in Bowne Township, Kent County, in the U.S. state of Michigan.

== Geography ==
Alto is situated on Pratt Lake Creek, at the intersection of Bancroft Avenue and 60th Street, just west of M-50, about two miles south of exit 52 off I-96.

Alto is situated at 42°51′24″N 85°22′49″W on the boundary between section 33 of Lowell Township and section 4 of Bowne Township, although it lies mostly within Bowne. The Alto ZIP code 49302 serves most of Bowne Township as well as portions of Lowell Township to the north, Cascade Township to the northwest, and Caledonia Township to the west. It also serves a very small area of Campbell Township in Ionia County around the community of Elmdale.

== History ==
Alto was founded by David N. Skidmore in 1845. A post office was established in September 1851, with Daniel C McVean as the first postmaster. Alto was also a station on the Detroit, Grand Rapids and Western Railroad. It was named by Lucy Skidmore McVean for being the highest point of land along the railroad between Grand Rapids and Detroit. The annual Alto Harvest Festival is held in September of each year. This tradition started in 1970.

== Education ==
Lowell and Caledonia Area Schools operates area public schools. Alto and Caledonia Elementary Schools serves Alto, while Lowell and Caledonia Middle School and Lowell High School serve the entire district.

== See also ==
- Kent District Library
