= Lowell School District =

Lowell School District may refer to:

- Lowell School District (Maine)
- Lowell Area Schools (Michigan)
- Lowell School District (Oregon)
- Lowell Public Schools (Massachusetts)
