= Lowell Area Schools =

School district headquartered in Lowell, Michigan, United States

Address
- 300 High Street Lowell, Kent, Michigan, 49331; United States

District information
- Type: Public
- Motto: Learners today, leaders tomorrow, Red Arrows for life.
- Grades: PreK–12
- Superintendent: Nate Fowler
- Budget: $63,588,000 expenditures 2022-2023
- NCES District ID: 2622050

Students and staff
- Students: 3,470 (2024–2025)
- Teachers: 194.79 (2024-2025) FTE
- Staff: 412.3 (2024-2025) FTE
- Student–teacher ratio: 17.81 (2024-2025)
- District mascot: Red Arrows

Other information
- Website: www.lowellschools.com

Lowell Area Schools (LAS) is a school district serving Lowell, Michigan.

In addition to Lowell itself, the school district serves parts of the following townships in Kent County: Ada, Bowne, Cascade, Cannon, Grattan, Lowell and Vergennes. In Ionia County, it serves parts of Boston Township, Campbell Township, and Keene Township.

== History ==
In 1838, Lowell built the first schoolhouse between Grand Rapids and Ionia. In 1862, the town upgraded to a union school, which was organized with a modern grading system. The building had two stories, was made of wood, and had a central cupola with a bell. It was known as the "Old White Schoolhouse." In the 1870s, elementary schools were built in the town and the union school served high school students.

A new Lowell High School was built in 1916. It was located at the southwest corner of N. Monroe Street and King Street. It continued to serve until fall 1963, when it was replaced by a building at 750 Foreman Road. The architectural firm of the 1963 building was Post-McMillen-Palmer. That building became Lowell Middle School when the current Lowell High School opened in 1994. Renovations and several additions were completed at the middle school in 2023.

== Schools ==
List of Schools in the Lowell Area Schools District
School	Address	Notes
Lowell High School	11700 Vergennes, Lowell	Grades 9-12. Opened fall 1994.
Unity Alternative High School	300 High St., Lowell	Alternative high school headquartered at administration building.
Lowell Middle School	750 Foreman Road, Lowell	Grades 6-8. Renovation project completed fall 2023. Formerly Lowell High School.
Alto Elementary School	6150 Bancroft, Alto	Grades K-5
Bushnell Elementary School	700 Elizabeth St., Lowell	Grades K-1
Cherry Creek Elementary School	12675 Foreman Road, Lowell	Grades 2-5
Murray Lake Elementary School	3275 Alden Nash NE, Lowell	Grades K-5
Yieter Learning Center	320 Amity, Lowell	Preschool
The Wittenbach-Wege Agriscience and Environmental Center	11715 Vergennes, Lowell	Natural sciences center
