= Grattan Township, Michigan =

- Civil township
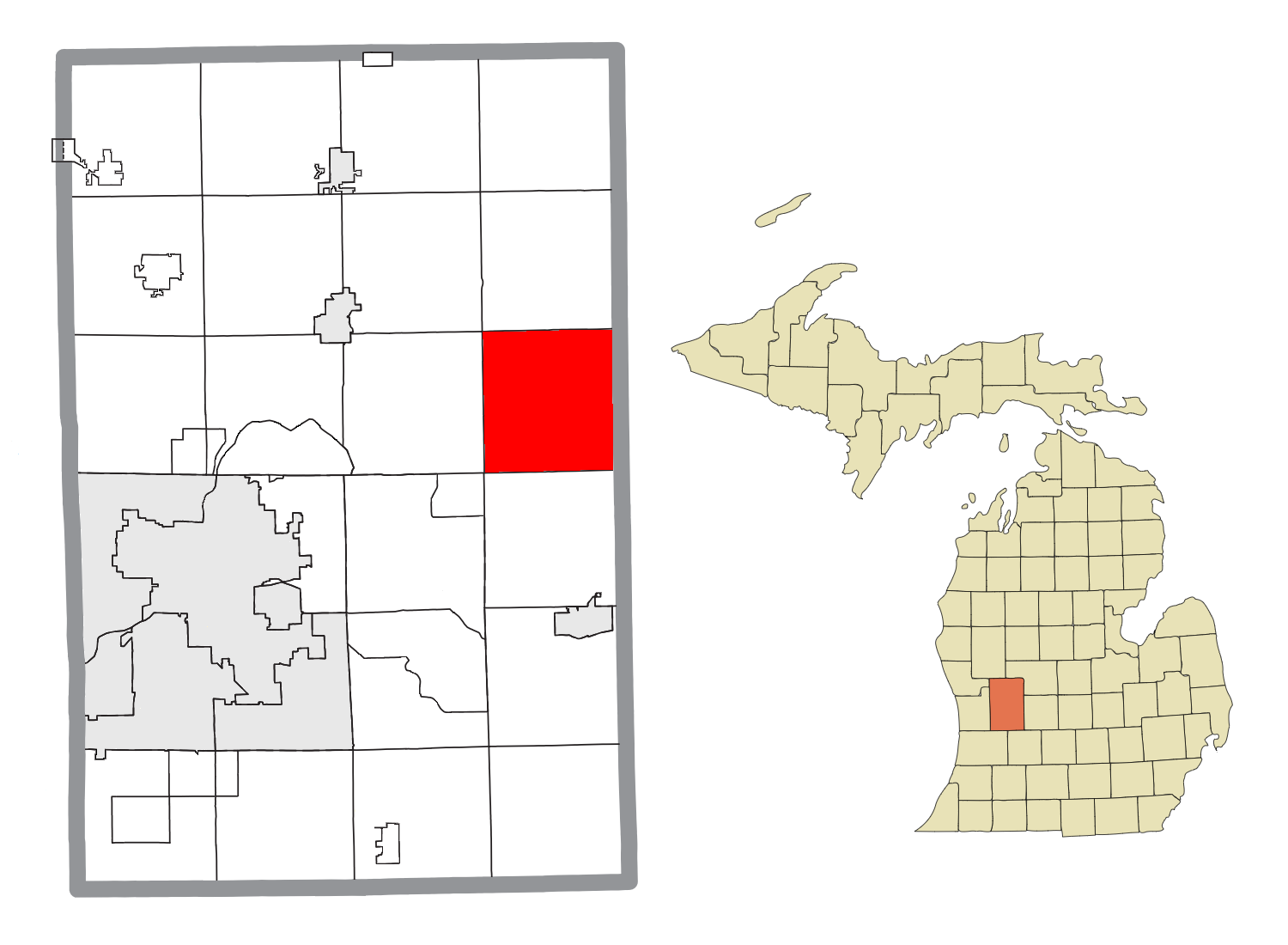
- Location within Kent County

- Location within the state of Michigan Location within the United States
- Coordinates: 43°04′59″N 85°22′35″W
- Country: United States
- State: Michigan
- County: Kent
- Established: 1846

Government
  - Supervisor: Franklin Force
  - Clerk: Michelle Alberts

Area
  - Total: 36.95 sq mi (95.70 km^{2})
  - Land: 33.86 sq mi (87.70 km^{2})
  - Water: 3.09 sq mi (8.00 km^{2})
- Elevation: 863 ft (263 m)

Population (2020)
  - Total: 3,809
  - Density: 112.5/sq mi (43.43/km^{2})
- Time zone: UTC-5 (Eastern (EST))
  - Summer (DST): UTC-4 (EDT)
- ZIP code(s): 48809 (Belding); 49301 (Ada); 49331 (Lowell); 49341 (Rockford)
- Area code: 616
- FIPS code: 26-34560
- GNIS feature ID: 1626389
- Website: Official website

Grattan Township is a civil township of Kent County in the U.S. state of Michigan. As of the 2020 census, the township population was 3,809.

It is part of the Grand Rapids metropolitan area and is located about 15 miles (24 km) northeast of the city of Grand Rapids.

== Communities ==
- Grattan (or Grattan Center) is an unincorporated community located in the center of the township at 43°05′03″N 85°22′52″W. Grattan was first settled as an Irish Catholic settlement in 1844. The community had its own post office from January 18, 1849 until February 14, 1906.
- Parnell is an unincorporated community in the southwest corner of the township at 43°02′36″N 85°24′40″W. The community was settled with the construction of St Patrick's Catholic Church in 1848. A post office operated briefly in Parnell from January 4, 1889 until September 30, 1903.

== History ==
Grattan Township was established in 1846, and named in honor of the Irish orator and politician Henry Grattan.

== Geography ==
According to the U.S. Census Bureau, the township has a total area of 36.95 square miles (95.70 km^{2}), of which 33.86 square miles (87.70 km^{2}) is land and 3.09 square miles (8.00 km^{2}) (8.36%) is water.

There are at least 25 lakes in the township, varying in size from 30 acres (12 ha) to 300 acres (120 ha) each. Many of these find a natural outlet through Seely Creek, the only stream of note in the township, and which empties into the Flat River near Smyrna in Ionia County.

=== Major highways ===
- M-44 (Belding Avenue) runs east–west through the center of the township.

== Demographics ==
As of the census of 2000, there were 3,551 people, 1,235 households, and 990 families residing in the township. The population density was 101.5 inhabitants per square mile (39.2/km^{2}). There were 1,428 housing units at an average density of 40.8 per square mile (15.8/km^{2}). The racial makeup of the township was 96.90% White, 0.70% African American, 0.23% Native American, 0.23% Asian, 0.51% from other races, and 1.44% from two or more races. Hispanic or Latino of any race were 2.56% of the population.

There were 1,235 households, out of which 37.8% had children under the age of 18 living with them, 70.2% were married couples living together, 6.2% had a female householder with no husband present, and 19.8% were non-families. 16.0% of all households were made up of individuals, and 4.6% had someone living alone who was 65 years of age or older. The average household size was 2.82 and the average family size was 3.14.

The age distribution of the township includes 27.9% of the population under the age of 18, 6.2% from 18 to 24, 30.4% from 25 to 44, 26.6% from 45 to 64, and 9.0% who were 65 years of age or older. The median age was 38 years. For every 100 females, there were 105.6 males. For every 100 females age 18 and over, there were 105.5 males.

The median income for a household in the township was $56,467, and the median income for a family was $62,148. Males had a median income of $44,813 versus $27,014 for females. The per capita income for the township was $23,213. About 1.2% of families and 2.3% of the population were below the poverty line, including 2.6% of those under age 18 and 2.5% of those age 65 or over.

== Education ==
Grattan Township is served by three separate school districts. The majority of the township is served by Belding Area School District to the east in Ionia County. A small western portion of the township is served by Rockford Public Schools, and the southern portion of the township is served by Lowell Area Schools.
