= Lake Bella Vista (Michigan) =

Lake in Kent County, Michigan

- Location within Michigan Location within the United States
- Location: Cannon Township, Michigan
- Coordinates: 43°05′24″N 85°30′58″W
- Type: Lake
- Basin countries: United States
- Max. depth: 20 ft (6.1 m)
- Surface elevation: 823 ft (251 m)

Lake Bella Vista is in northwest Cannon Township, Kent County in the U.S. state of Michigan. The lake was originally known as "Grass Lake" and once lay in the center of a marsh surrounded by pastureland as well as apple and cherry orchards. Grass Lake was one of the so-called "triplet lakes" lying along M-44. Its sister lakes to the east are Silver Lake and Bostwick Lake. Developed by the Velting family contractors in the mid-1970s, Grass Lake was expanded and a large dike was added to the western edge to raise the water level. Residential and commercial development was soon constructed and in the early 21st century, a lakeside suburban sub-division also called "Lake Bella Vista" functions very much as a community. Lake Bella Vista is bordered by M-44, (Belding Road) on the south, 9 Mile Road on the North, Blakely Road on the West, and Myers Lake Avenue on the East. To the south are the Lockhart family orchards and the beginning of the Stout Creek watershed which cuts through forest-concealed glacial dunes bordering the Woodbrook area.

In the spring of 2013, the Rockford High School Rowing Team used the lake for team practices during a flood which made their boathouse, on the Grand River, inaccessible.

The residents of Lake Bella Vista are all in Rockford public schools, with elementary students attending Crestwood Elementary and middle school students attending East Rockford Middle School.

== Incidents ==
On June 2, 2020, at 7:43 pm EST, Molly Rasmussen, aged 16, who attended nearby secondary school Forest Hills Eastern High, jumped into the water near the lake's dam, located on the west side, and did not resurface. Her friends called for help immediately. The Kent County Sheriff responded to the scene, and were unable to locate her, until the Sheriff Department's diving team found her body later that night. A memorial was held at 7:00 pm on June 3, having 2 minutes of silence. she suffered a seizure after jumping into the water, ultimately causing her to drown.

== See also ==
- List of lakes in Michigan
