= Pewamo, Michigan =

- Village
- Location of Pewamo, Michigan
- Coordinates: 43°0′3″N 84°50′47″W
- Country: United States
- State: Michigan
- County: Ionia
- Township: Lyons
- Established: 1834

Government
  - President: Randy Zenk

Area
  - Total: 1.00 sq mi (2.59 km^{2})
  - Land: 1.00 sq mi (2.59 km^{2})
  - Water: 0 sq mi (0.00 km^{2})
- Elevation: 735 ft (224 m)

Population (2020)
  - Total: 503
  - Density: 502.9/sq mi (194.18/km^{2})
- Time zone: UTC-5 (Eastern (EST))
  - Summer (DST): UTC-4 (EDT)
- ZIP code: 48873
- Area code: 989
- FIPS code: 26-63900
- GNIS feature ID: 0634746
- Website: https://pewamo.gov/

Pewamo is a village in Lyons Township, Ionia County in the U.S. state of Michigan. The village was settled in 1834 as a station along the Detroit, Grand Haven and Milwaukee Railway. The former line now is part of the Fred Meijer Clinton-Ionia-Shiawassee Trail.

The village name was suggested by J.C. Blanchard in honor of Chief Pewamo, with whom he had hunted along the nearby Grand River.

As of the 2020 census, Pewamo had a population of 503.

Mr. Dodd Takes the Air, a 1937 Warner Brothers American musical comedy film directed by Alfred E. Green, begins at the Pewamo Strawberry Festival, the home town of the main character. Composer Harry Warren and lyricist Al Dubin were nominated at the 10th Academy Awards in the category of Best Song for "Remember Me".

== Geography ==
According to the United States Census Bureau, the village has a total area of 1.00 square mile (2.59 km^{2}), all land.

== Demographics ==
Historical population
Census	Pop.	Note	%±
1880	316		—
1890	384		21.5%
1900	446		16.1%
1910	289		−35.2%
1920	316		9.3%
1930	392		24.1%
1940	415		5.9%
1950	432		4.1%
1960	415		−3.9%
1970	498		20.0%
1980	488		−2.0%
1990	520		6.6%
2000	560		7.7%
2010	469		−16.2%
2020	503		7.2%
U.S. Decennial Census

=== 2010 census ===
As of the census of 2010, there were 469 people, 186 households, and 126 families residing in the village. The population density was 469.0 inhabitants per square mile (181.1/km^{2}). There were 204 housing units at an average density of 204.0 per square mile (78.8/km^{2}). The racial makeup of the village was 95.1% White, 0.2% African American, 1.1% Native American, 0.4% Asian, and 3.2% from two or more races. Hispanic or Latino of any race were 1.3% of the population.

There were 186 households, of which 29.6% had children under the age of 18 living with them, 54.8% were married couples living together, 7.5% had a female householder with no husband present, 5.4% had a male householder with no wife present, and 32.3% were non-families. 28.5% of all households were made up of individuals, and 12.9% had someone living alone who was 65 years of age or older. The average household size was 2.52 and the average family size was 3.13.

The median age in the village was 39.9 years. 24.3% of residents were under the age of 18; 9% were between the ages of 18 and 24; 22.8% were from 25 to 44; 27.1% were from 45 to 64; and 16.8% were 65 years of age or older. The gender makeup of the village was 49.5% male and 50.5% female.

=== 2000 census ===
As of the census of 2000, there were 560 people, 197 households, and 144 families residing in the village. The population density was 549.7 inhabitants per square mile (212.2/km^{2}). There were 202 housing units at an average density of 198.3 per square mile (76.6/km^{2}). The racial makeup of the village was 98.57% White, 0.18% Native American, and 1.25% from two or more races. Hispanic or Latino of any race were 1.07% of the population.

There were 197 households, out of which 38.1% had children under the age of 18 living with them, 63.5% were married couples living together, 5.6% had a female householder with no husband present, and 26.9% were non-families. 24.9% of all households were made up of individuals, and 11.7% had someone living alone who was 65 years of age or older. The average household size was 2.84 and the average family size was 3.44.

In the village, the population was spread out, with 31.6% under the age of 18, 8.9% from 18 to 24, 27.3% from 25 to 44, 16.6% from 45 to 64, and 15.5% who were 65 years of age or older. The median age was 33 years. For every 100 females, there were 97.2 males. For every 100 females age 18 and over, there were 102.6 males.

The median income for a household in the village was $39,500, and the median income for a family was $46,667. Males had a median income of $41,563 versus $22,143 for females. The per capita income for the village was $14,776. About 0.7% of families and 3.3% of the population were below the poverty line, including none of those under age 18 and 7.6% of those age 65 or over.
