= Lakewood High School (Lake Odessa, Michigan) =

Location
- 7223 Velte Road; Lake Odessa, Michigan 48849; United States; 42.7596°N 85.1151°W

Information
- Type: Public
- Motto: Preparing Our Students for Success
- Founded: 1961
- School district: Lakewood Public Schools
- Superintendent: Jodi Duits
- Director: Michael Quinn
- Principal: Stephen Williams
- Grades: 9-12
- Student to teacher ratio: 21:1
- Campus type: Closed
- Colors: Navy Blue & White
- Athletics conference: Capital Area Activities Conference
- Mascot: Viking
- Team name: Vikings
- Communities served: Clarksville, Lake Odessa, Sunfield, and Woodland
- Website: Lakewood High School

Lakewood High School is a public secondary school in Woodland Township, Michigan, located in Barry County. In addition, the Lakewood Public Schools district includes Lakewood Middle School, Lakewood Elementary, and Lakewood Early Childhood Center.

== History ==
The Lakewood School District consists primarily of the former Clarksville, Lake Odessa, Sunfield and Woodland school districts. It was founded in the early 1960s. In the spring of 1964, the first senior class, combining all the senior students in the district, was graduated. The senior class of 1965 was the first class to graduate from the new high school.

== Enrollment ==
In 2024, Lakewood High School had 519 students. It had 13% minority enrollment, 24 full-time teachers, and a graduation rate of 91%.
