= Marie Zeigler =

American professional baseball player (1937–2014)

- Born: July 3, 1937; Belding, Michigan, U.S.
- Died: November 28, 2014 (aged 77)
- Batted: Right Threw: Right

All-American Girls Professional Baseball League debut
- Grand Rapids Chicks

Marie Zeigler was the second-youngest player on the Grand Rapids Chicks of the All-American Girls Professional Baseball League (AAGPBL) in 1953. She batted right and threw right, was born July 3, 1937 in Belding, Michigan and died November 28, 2014.

== External sources ==
- Image of the 1953 team including Zeigler
