= Portland Township, Michigan =

- Township
- Location within Michigan Location within the United States
- Coordinates: 42°52′58″N 84°54′48″W
- Country: United States
- State: Michigan
- County: Ionia

Area
  - Total: 33.5 sq mi (86.8 km^{2})
  - Land: 32.4 sq mi (84.0 km^{2})
  - Water: 1.1 sq mi (2.8 km^{2})
- Elevation: 784 ft (239 m)

Population (2020)
  - Total: 3,881
  - Density: 120/sq mi (46.2/km^{2})
- Time zone: UTC-5 (Eastern (EST))
  - Summer (DST): UTC-4 (EDT)
- ZIP code: 48875
- Area code: 517
- FIPS code: 26-65880
- GNIS feature ID: 1626935
- Website: https://www.portlandtownship.org/

Portland Township is a civil township of Ionia County in the U.S. state of Michigan. The population was 3,881 at the 2020 census. The City of Portland is situated in the south central portion of the township, but is administratively autonomous.

== Geography ==
According to the United States Census Bureau, the township has a total area of 33.5 square miles (87 km^{2}), of which 32.4 square miles (84 km^{2}) is land and 1.1 square miles (2.8 km^{2}) (3.19%) is water.

== Communities ==
- Collins was an unincorporated community in Portland township. It had a post office from 1871 until 1911.
- Portland is a city located in the south central portion of Portland Township. As all cities in Michigan, it is administratively separate.

== Demographics ==
As of the census of 2000, there were 2,460 people, 828 households, and 678 families residing in the township. The population density was 75.8 inhabitants per square mile (29.3/km^{2}). There were 855 housing units at an average density of 26.4 per square mile (10.2/km^{2}). The racial makeup of the township was 98.29% White, 0.41% Native American, 0.12% Asian, 0.65% from other races, and 0.53% from two or more races. Hispanic or Latino of any race were 1.91% of the population.

There were 828 households, out of which 43.0% had children under the age of 18 living with them, 72.8% were married couples living together, 5.3% had a female householder with no husband present, and 18.0% were non-families. 14.4% of all households were made up of individuals, and 5.0% had someone living alone who was 65 years of age or older. The average household size was 2.97 and the average family size was 3.29.

In the township the population was spread out, with 30.9% under the age of 18, 7.6% from 18 to 24, 29.8% from 25 to 44, 25.0% from 45 to 64, and 6.6% who were 65 years of age or older. The median age was 34 years. For every 100 females, there were 104.3 males. For every 100 females age 18 and over, there were 102.0 males.

The median income for a household in the township was $59,700, and the median income for a family was $63,125. Males had a median income of $45,230 versus $29,784 for females. The per capita income for the township was $23,792. About 3.9% of families and 3.6% of the population were below the poverty line, including 2.6% of those under age 18 and 8.9% of those age 65 or over.
