= Lowell High School (Michigan) =

High school in Michigan, United States

Location
- 11700 Vergennes; Vergennes Township (Lowell address), Michigan 49331; United States; 42°57′18″N 85°22′44″W

Information
- School type: Public secondary
- School district: Lowell Area Schools
- Superintendent: Nate Fowler
- Principal: Dominic Lowe
- Teaching staff: 56.47 (FTE)
- Grades: 9-12
- Enrollment: 1,058 (2024–2025)
- Student to teacher ratio: 18.74
- Colors: Red and white
- Fight song: “Go Arrows!”
- Athletics conference: River City Alliance
- Nickname: Red Arrows
- Website: www.lowellschools.com/high-school/

Student assessments
- 2021–22 school year Change vs. prior year

M-STEP 11th grade proficiency rates (Science / Social Studies)
- Advanced %: 15.1 / 8.5
- Proficient %: 23.2 / 37.0
- PR. Proficient %: 14.0 / 41.1
- Not Proficient %: 47.6 / 13.3

Average test scores
- SAT Total: 1055.0 (▲ +25.2)

Lowell High School is a public school located in Vergennes Township, Michigan, United States, with a Lowell postal address.

By 1992 the school district chose the Steve Wittenbach plot as the current high school location, which in turn helped gift a gas franchise to Grattan Township.

== Athletics ==
Lowell High School is a member of the Michigan High School Athletic Association. It is a Division II school, and all of its teams currently play within the River City Alliance. Lowell's nickname is the Red Arrows, named for the 32nd Red Arrow Infantry in World War II.

When Lowell opened, it was the first school in Michigan to have floodlights illuminating their football field for night games.

Lowell's biggest athletic rival is East Grand Rapids High School.

Lowell is known for its various athletic teams, and most known for its football, wrestling, and equestrian teams. Lowell currently has nineteen state titles among four teams. On October 29, 2009, the Red Arrows football team was ranked #1 in the nation in USA Today's Massey Ratings.

- State football titles: 2002 (Division 2), 2004 (Division 3), 2009 (Division 2)
- State wrestling titles: 2002, 2004, 2009, 2014, 2015, 2016, 2017, 2018, 2019, 2020, 2021, 2022, 2023, 2024, 2025 (All Wrestling Division 2)
- State boys bowling titles: 2017 (Division 2)
- State equestrian titles: 2000 (Division A), 2002 (Division C), 2003 (Division B), 2007 (Division C), 2019 (Division A)

== Notable alumni ==
- Mike Dumas, professional football player; former Indiana safety; played for eight years in the NFL with four different teams, including Houston Oilers.
- Anthony Kiedis, Red Hot Chili Peppers Lead Singer
- Keith Nichol, Michigan State University wide receiver
- Gabe Dean, sport wrestler; multiple–time NCAA Division I National champion for Cornell University
- Bryan Posthumus, state politician
- Lisa Posthumus Lyons, Michigan – Kent County politician
- Kaleb Ort, baseball player
