= Otisco Township, Michigan =

- Township
- Location within Michigan Location within the United States
- Coordinates: 43°4′22″N 85°14′31″W
- Country: United States
- State: Michigan
- County: Ionia

Area
  - Total: 32.0 sq mi (82.9 km^{2})
  - Land: 31.6 sq mi (81.8 km^{2})
  - Water: 0.42 sq mi (1.1 km^{2})
- Elevation: 820 ft (250 m)

Population (2020)
  - Total: 2,268
  - Density: 71.8/sq mi (27.7/km^{2})
- Time zone: UTC-5 (Eastern (EST))
  - Summer (DST): UTC-4 (EDT)
- ZIP code: 48809 (Belding)
- Area code: 616
- FIPS code: 26-61580
- GNIS feature ID: 1626867
- Website: https://www.otiscotwp.org/

Otisco Township is a civil township of Ionia County in the U.S. state of Michigan. As of the 2020 census, the township population was 2,268. Township offices are located in the community of Smyrna.

== Communities ==
- Belding is an incorporated city situated within the northeast corner of the township.
- Cooks Corners is the location of an early settlement in the township at 43°05′18″N 85°15′45″W near the junction of M-44 and M-91 just west of Belding.
- Smyrna is an unincorporated community at 43°03′34″N 85°15′46″W, a few miles southwest of Belding near mouth of the Seely Creek on the Flat River.

== History ==
The township was organized on March 6, 1838 from survey townships 7 and 8 north in range 8 of the Michigan Survey. Township 7 was set off as Keene Township on February 16, 1842. The name was taken from Otisco, New York.

The first white settlement in the area was where Dickinson Creek flows into the Flat River northeast of Belding. George W. Dickinson, in company with Thomas Cornell, both of New York, built a saw mill there in 1836. The settlement became known as Dicksonsonville, though when a post office was opened in June 1838, it was named "Otisco", after the township. Dickinson sold the mill to James M. Kidd in 1845, who platted the village as Kiddville and a post office reopened there with that name in February 1855. The Kiddville Post Office close in June 1894.

Cook's Corners was an important early settlement. In 1829, Rufus R. Cook, had led to the area a group of men from New York looking for prospective land for purchase. He returned in 1837 with his family. The post office in Dicksonville was transferred to Cooks Corners in 1839, with Cook as the first postmaster. He built a tavern there in 1846, which proved to be a popular area attraction, and a general store in 1850. The tavern was later a stop on the stage line between Ionia and Greenville. Cook platted the village as Cooks Corners in May 1856.

A significant number of German immigrants settled in the southern portion of the township, centered on section 33. A Roman Catholic church was built in 1850 and was replaced by a larger structure in 1872.

Although Munson Seely had settled at what is now Smyrna soon after Dickson had arrived, he moved on to Muskegon County a few years later, though his name remains in Seely Creek. After Seely, the next settler there was Calvin Smith in 1843. Soon after, George Dickson, seeking to expand his business, purchased land in the area to build a gristmill at the mouth of the Seely Creek. Dr. Wilbur Fisher arrived in 1848 and arranged to establish a post office there. According to postal regulations, the community was too near to Cooks Corners to have a separate office, but on his application for the office, Fisher had given section 32 as the location, just far enough to qualify for an office (even though it was over a mile away from the community. Fisher chose the name "Smyrna" for the office, reportedly because he wanted to ensure a unique name. In September 1853, Dickson platted the village as Mount Vernon, after Mount Vernon, Virginia, the home of the first U.S. president, George Washington. The village was also called "Mount Vernon Mills", but the post office was always Smyrna.

== Geography ==
According to the United States Census Bureau, the township has a total area of 32.0 square miles (83 km^{2}), of which 31.6 square miles (82 km^{2}) is land and 0.4 square miles (1.0 km^{2}) (1.28%) is water.

== Demographics ==
As of the census of 2000, there were 2,243 people, 779 households, and 603 families residing in the township. The population density was 71.0 inhabitants per square mile (27.4/km^{2}). There were 815 housing units at an average density of 25.8 per square mile (10.0/km^{2}). The racial makeup of the township was 97.46% White, 0.09% African American, 0.53% Native American, 0.31% Asian, 0.18% from other races, and 1.43% from two or more races. Hispanic or Latino of any race were 1.74% of the population.

There were 779 households, out of which 39.5% had children under the age of 18 living with them, 66.8% were married couples living together, 6.8% had a female householder with no husband present, and 22.5% were non-families. 17.6% of all households were made up of individuals, and 6.5% had someone living alone who was 65 years of age or older. The average household size was 2.88 and the average family size was 3.28.

In the township, the population was spread out, with 30.5% under the age of 18, 7.7% from 18 to 24, 31.4% from 25 to 44, 22.5% from 45 to 64, and 7.8% who were 65 years of age or older. The median age was 34 years. For every 100 females, there were 99.7 males. For every 100 females age 18 and over, there were 104.1 males.

The median income for a household in the township was $45,042, and the median income for a family was $55,446. Males had a median income of $37,123 versus $27,100 for females. The per capita income for the township was $21,674. About 7.1% of families and 8.3% of the population were below the poverty line, including 10.7% of those under age 18 and 11.4% of those age 65 or over.

== Notable people ==
- Allen B. Morse, United States diplomat, Michigan jurist and politician, was born in Otisco Township.
