= Lyons Township, Michigan =

- Township
- Location within Michigan Location within the United States
- Coordinates: 42°59′37″N 84°55′0″W
- Country: United States
- State: Michigan
- County: Ionia

Area
  - Total: 36.9 sq mi (95.7 km^{2})
  - Land: 36.2 sq mi (93.8 km^{2})
  - Water: 0.73 sq mi (1.9 km^{2})
- Elevation: 761 ft (232 m)

Population (2020)
  - Total: 3,513
  - Density: 97.0/sq mi (37.5/km^{2})
- Time zone: UTC-5 (Eastern (EST))
  - Summer (DST): UTC-4 (EDT)
- ZIP code: 48851
- Area code: 989
- FIPS code: 26-49920
- GNIS feature ID: 1626652
- Website: https://www.lyonstownship.org/

Lyons Township is a civil township of Ionia County in the U.S. state of Michigan. The population was 3,513 at the 2020 census. The village of Lyons is mostly within the township. The villages of Muir and Pewamo are also within the township.

== Geography ==
According to the United States Census Bureau, the township has a total area of 37.0 square miles (96 km^{2}), of which 36.2 square miles (94 km^{2}) is land and 0.7 square miles (1.8 km^{2}) (1.95%) is water. The township contains portions of the Maple River State Game Area.

== Demographics ==
As of the census of 2000, there were 3,446 people, 1,268 households, and 929 families residing in the township. The population density was 95.1 inhabitants per square mile (36.7/km^{2}). There were 1,323 housing units at an average density of 36.5 per square mile (14.1/km^{2}). The racial makeup of the township was 97.10% White, 0.09% African American, 0.61% Native American, 0.03% Asian, 0.49% from other races, and 1.68% from two or more races. Hispanic or Latino of any race were 1.68% of the population.

There were 1,268 households, out of which 37.9% had children under the age of 18 living with them, 56.9% were married couples living together, 11.0% had a female householder with no husband present, and 26.7% were non-families. 22.2% of all households were made up of individuals, and 9.1% had someone living alone who was 65 years of age or older. The average household size was 2.72 and the average family size was 3.17.

In the township the population was spread out, with 29.9% under the age of 18, 8.3% from 18 to 24, 29.4% from 25 to 44, 21.4% from 45 to 64, and 11.0% who were 65 years of age or older. The median age was 34 years. For every 100 females, there were 101.1 males. For every 100 females age 18 and over, there were 98.4 males.

The median income for a household in the township was $38,750, and the median income for a family was $45,378. Males had a median income of $34,000 versus $24,259 for females. The per capita income for the township was $16,578. About 7.1% of families and 8.7% of the population were below the poverty line, including 11.1% of those under age 18 and 4.5% of those age 65 or over.
