= Ronald Township, Michigan =

- Township
- Location within Michigan Location within the United States
- Coordinates: 43°4′44″N 85°1′13″W
- Country: United States
- State: Michigan
- County: Ionia

Area
  - Total: 36.5 sq mi (94.5 km^{2})
  - Land: 36.3 sq mi (94.1 km^{2})
  - Water: 0.15 sq mi (0.4 km^{2})
- Elevation: 830 ft (253 m)

Population (2020)
  - Total: 1,861
  - Density: 51.2/sq mi (19.8/km^{2})
- Time zone: UTC-5 (Eastern (EST))
  - Summer (DST): UTC-4 (EDT)
- FIPS code: 26-69440
- GNIS feature ID: 1627001
- Website: https://www.ronaldtownship.org/

Ronald Township is a civil township of Ionia County in the U.S. state of Michigan. The population was 1,861 at the 2020 census.

Ronald Township was formed in 1845 from parts of Lyons and Ionia townships, and given its name by state representative A. L. Roof, who said he was inspired by the lead character in a novel he was reading at the time. (This may have been Sir Walter Scott's narrative poem The Lord of the Isles, in which the protagonist is named Ronald.)

== Communities ==
- Palo is an unincorporated community and census-designated place in the northern part of the township at 43°06′45″N 84°59′08″W. It began on land owned by Matthew and John Van Vleck. The name "Palo" [pronounced Pay-Low, locally] was suggested by John in honor of the victory by General Zachary Taylor at the Battle of Palo Alto, the first major battle of the Mexican–American War fought on May 8, 1846. A post office was established on July 14, 1857, with Dr. Orla H. Taylor as the first postmaster. The community was first platted and recorded on March 12, 1867 by William H. Freeman. The Palo post office was discontinued on February 4, 1995, although the Palo ZIP code 48870 continues to provide P.O. Box only service through use of the local store Joe's Market and a postal contract.

The Palo CDP is in the Carson City-Crystal Area School District.

== Geography ==
According to the United States Census Bureau, the township has a total area of 36.5 square miles (95 km^{2}), of which 36.3 square miles (94 km^{2}) is land and 0.2 square miles (0.52 km^{2}) (0.44%) is water.

== Demographics ==
As of the census of 2000, there were 1,903 people, 651 households, and 514 families residing in the township. The population density was 52.4 inhabitants per square mile (20.2/km^{2}). There were 708 housing units at an average density of 19.5 per square mile (7.5/km^{2}). The racial makeup of the township was 96.79% White, 0.68% African American, 0.53% Native American, 0.11% Asian, 0.74% from other races, and 1.16% from two or more races. Hispanic or Latino of any race were 2.79% of the population.

There were 651 households, out of which 38.6% had children under the age of 18 living with them, 65.9% were married couples living together, 7.7% had a female householder with no husband present, and 20.9% were non-families. 15.7% of all households were made up of individuals, and 5.5% had someone living alone who was 65 years of age or older. The average household size was 2.90 and the average family size was 3.17.

In the township the population was spread out, with 29.6% under the age of 18, 7.7% from 18 to 24, 29.6% from 25 to 44, 24.0% from 45 to 64, and 9.0% who were 65 years of age or older. The median age was 36 years. For every 100 females, there were 106.6 males. For every 100 females age 18 and over, there were 102.3 males.

The median income for a household in the township was $45,952, and the median income for a family was $49,620. Males had a median income of $36,989 versus $24,792 for females. The per capita income for the township was $17,826. About 6.4% of families and 9.8% of the population were below the poverty line, including 6.3% of those under age 18 and 20.5% of those age 65 or over.
