= Saranac, Michigan =

- Village
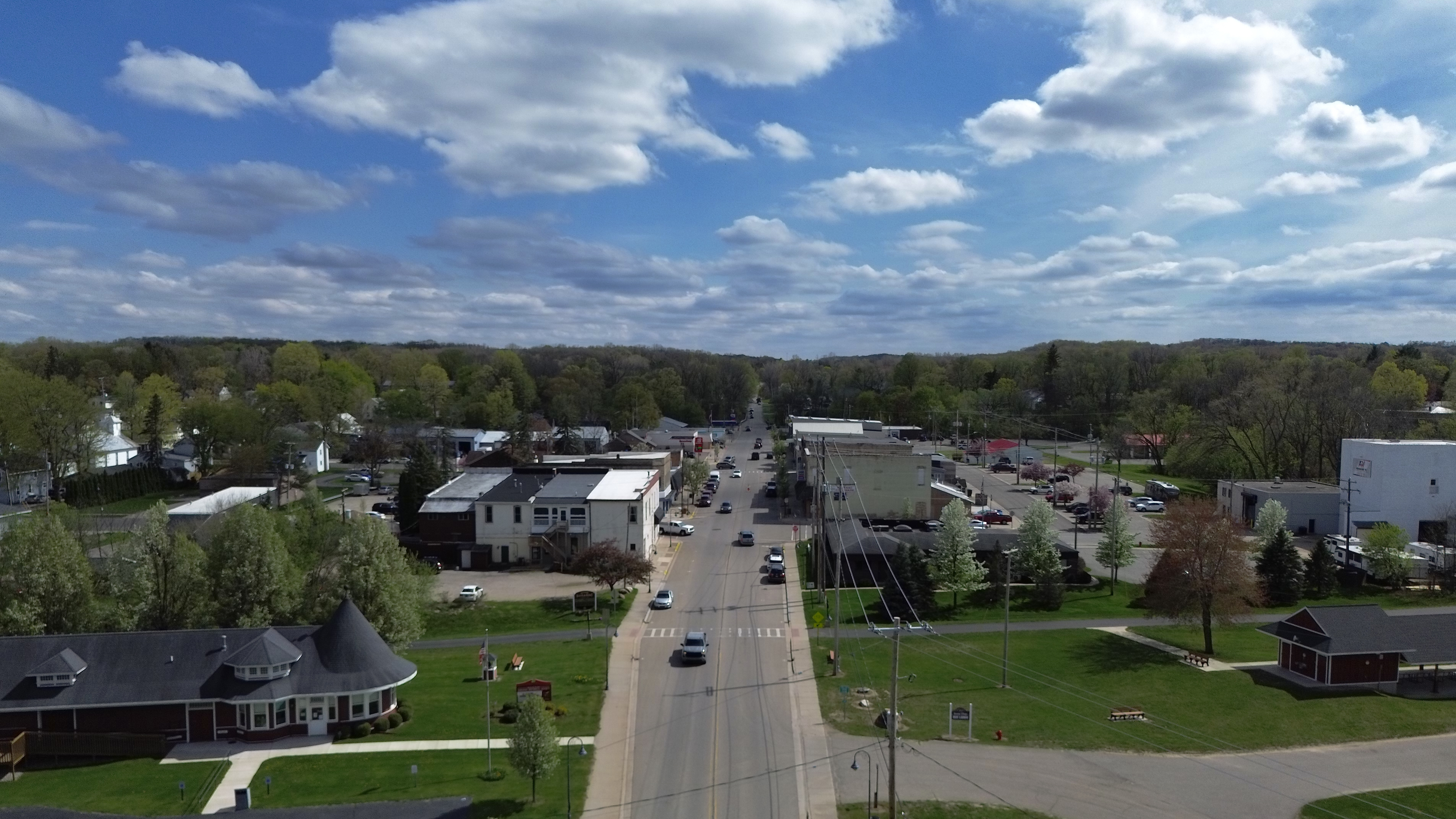
- Saranac in 2025

- Location of Saranac, Michigan
- Coordinates: 42°55′47″N 85°12′43″W
- Country: United States
- State: Michigan
- County: Ionia

Area
  - Total: 1.20 sq mi (3.11 km^{2})
  - Land: 1.15 sq mi (2.98 km^{2})
  - Water: 0.050 sq mi (0.13 km^{2})
- Elevation: 646 ft (197 m)

Population (2020)
  - Total: 1,376
  - Density: 1,196.3/sq mi (461.91/km^{2})
- Time zone: UTC-5 (Eastern (EST))
  - Summer (DST): UTC-4 (EDT)
- ZIP code: 48881
- Area code: 616
- FIPS code: 26-71660
- GNIS feature ID: 0637257
- Website: villageofsaranacmi.org

Saranac is a village in Boston Township, Ionia County in the U.S. state of Michigan. As of the 2020 census, Saranac had a population of 1,376. Today, Saranac serves as a retail and services hub for agricultural areas surrounding the village.

== History ==
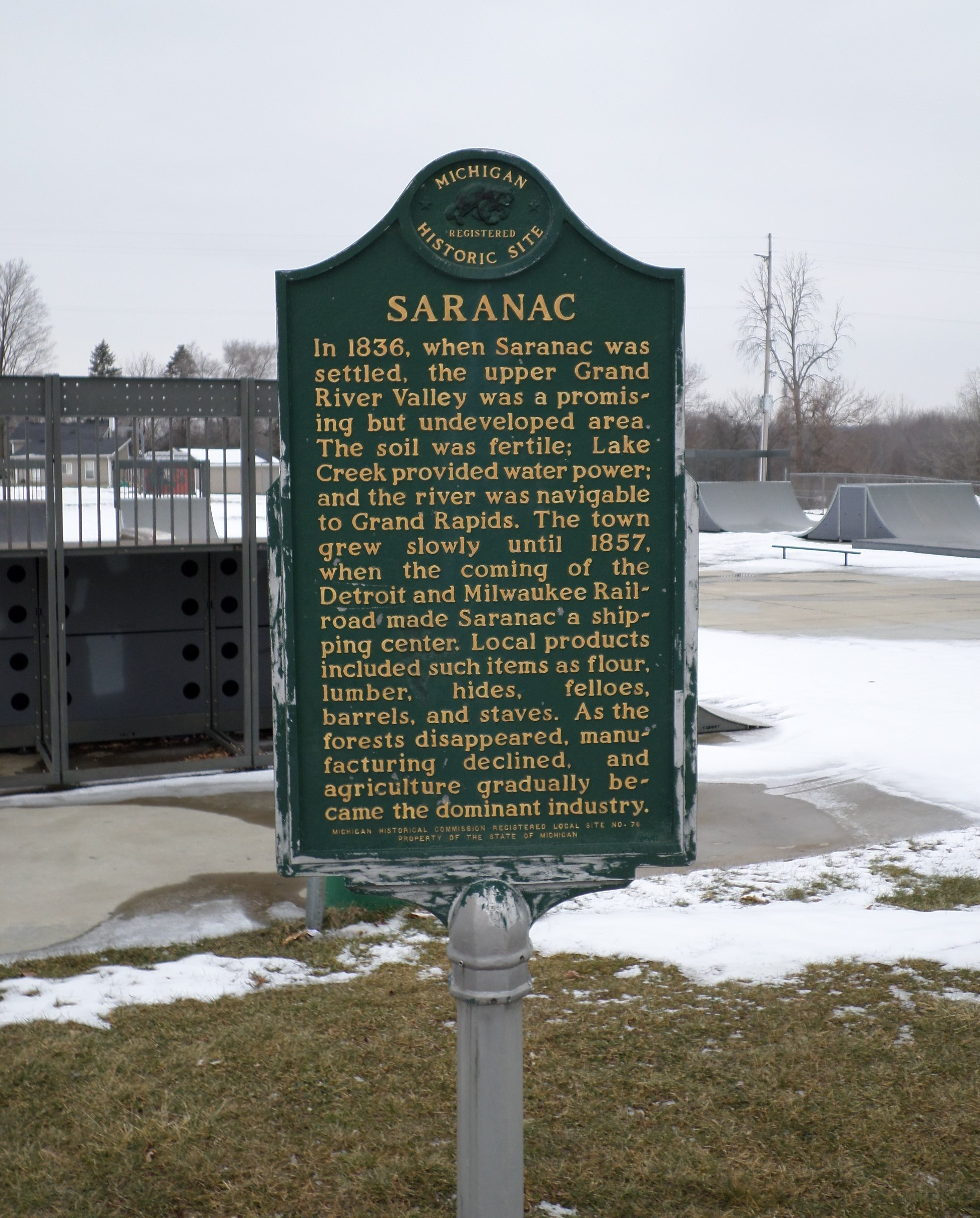
Sign in Saranac, Michigan summarizes the village's history

Saranac had its roots in 1836, when a Grand Rapids judge by the name of Jefferson Morrison purchased the land where Lake Creek meets the Grand River. Soon after, he sold parts of the land to Dwight & Hutchinson from Detroit, and together, they founded the village. Proceeding quickly, the proprietors named it Saranac and held a public sale in Detroit. There they sold off many Saranac lots without doing much to ensure the integrity of their original records. Soon after, Dwight & Hutchinson became concerned over the lack of development of the village by the lot-purchasers and gave Cyprian S. Hooker land on which to build a saw mill. Construction began in 1837, but didn't see completion until 1841. Partnering with a furniture maker named Jerry Stocking, the two set out to make their fortunes in the new village. However, they did not find success, and in 1846, the gentlemen gave up and moved away. Other villagers followed suit, convinced the village was doomed. In 1847, a merchant named Ammon Wilson moved in and set up shop on Stocking's former property and later built a warehouse to ship wheat to Grand Rapids, which saw considerable success. The village grew around it; a tavern and a hotel soon followed. In 1851, proprietors of the sold-off lots were allowed to re-dub the township "Boston", due to an oversight in Dwight & Hutchinson's records and it wouldn't be until 1859 that popular demand would see the name changed back to "Saranac". Schools, stores, and churches, followed in the subsequent years. In 1857, the first train to reach Saranac rolled through, marking a significant period of growth for the village.

== Geography ==
According to the United States Census Bureau, the village has a total area of 1.20 square miles (3.11 km^{2}), of which 1.15 square miles (2.98 km^{2}) is land and 0.05 square miles (0.13 km^{2}) is water.

The village is located along the Grand River Valley, within a deep glacial drainage channel and is intersected by the Grand River. The landscape itself is dominated by dense forest, and sprawling, open farmland. The forest is closely associated with the basin of the Grand River and its floodplains and wetlands. However, wetlands have dwindled over the years, due to drainage and filling in order to improve agricultural opportunities within the region. This is not atypical within the state of Michigan, despite the vast ecological importance that Michigan's wetlands possess.

== Government ==
Saranac is a general-law village with an elected council consisting of a president, clerk, treasurer, and six trustees.

== Demographics ==
Historical population
Census	Pop.	Note	%±
1860	468		—
1870	724		54.7%
1880	877		21.1%
1890	790		−9.9%
1900	768		−2.8%
1910	845		10.0%
1920	750		−11.2%
1930	729		−2.8%
1940	849		16.5%
1950	885		4.2%
1960	1,081		22.1%
1970	1,223		13.1%
1980	1,421		16.2%
1990	1,461		2.8%
2000	1,326		−9.2%
2010	1,325		−0.1%
2020	1,376		3.8%
U.S. Decennial Census

=== 2010 census ===
As of the census of 2010, there were 1,325 people, 573 households, and 339 families residing in the village. The population density was 1,152.2 inhabitants per square mile (444.9/km^{2}). There were 616 housing units at an average density of 535.7 per square mile (206.8/km^{2}). The racial makeup of the village was 97.4% White, 0.2% African American, 0.2% Native American, 0.4% Asian, 0.8% from other races, and 1.1% from two or more races. Hispanic or Latino of any race were 2.7% of the population.

There were 573 households, of which 33.3% had children under the age of 18 living with them, 42.2% were married couples living together, 12.6% had a female householder with no husband present, 4.4% had a male householder with no wife present, and 40.8% were non-families. 36.5% of all households were made up of individuals, and 15.9% had someone living alone who was 65 years of age or older. The average household size was 2.31 and the average family size was 3.01.

The median age in the village was 37.2 years. 28% of residents were under the age of 18; 6.8% were between the ages of 18 and 24; 24.2% were from 25 to 44; 25.8% were from 45 to 64; and 15.1% were 65 years of age or older. The gender makeup of the village was 47.6% male and 52.4% female.

=== 2000 census ===
As of the census of 2000, there were 1,326 people, 568 households, and 348 families residing in the village. The population density was 1,142.1 inhabitants per square mile (441.0/km^{2}). There were 589 housing units at an average density of 507.3 per square mile (195.9/km^{2}). The racial makeup of the village was 98.11% White, 0.08% African American, 0.08% Native American, 0.30% Asian, 0.08% Pacific Islander, 0.68% from other races, and 0.68% from two or more races. Hispanic or Latino of any race were 1.36% of the population.

There were 568 households, out of which 32.0% had children under the age of 18 living with them, 46.1% were married couples living together, 12.1% had a female householder with no husband present, and 38.6% were non-families. 35.9% of all households were made up of individuals, and 20.2% had someone living alone who was 65 years of age or older. The average household size was 2.33 and the average family size was 3.03.

In the village, the population was spread out, with 27.0% under the age of 18, 8.2% from 18 to 24, 26.3% from 25 to 44, 20.5% from 45 to 64, and 17.9% who were 65 years of age or older. The median age was 37 years. For every 100 females, there were 82.4 males. For every 100 females age 18 and over, there were 73.8 males.

The median income for a household in the village was $31,350, and the median income for a family was $41,250. Males had a median income of $35,221 versus $24,750 for females. The per capita income for the village was $15,867. About 5.9% of families and 11.3% of the population were below the poverty line, including 12.5% of those under age 18 and 17.4% of those age 65 or over.

== Notable people ==
- J Harlen Bretz, geologist
