= Muir, Michigan =

- Village
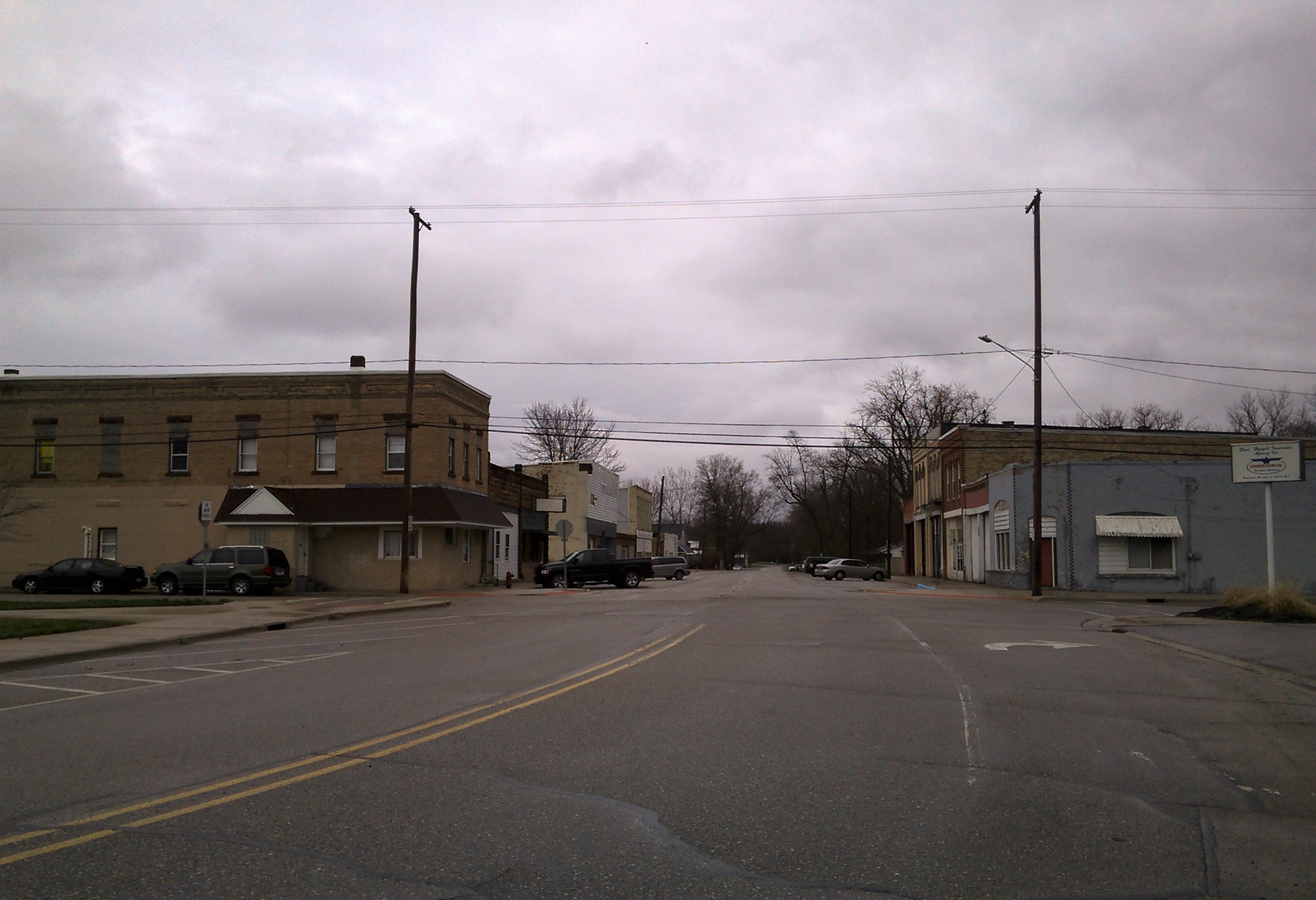

- Location of Muir Michigan
- Coordinates: 42°59′50″N 84°56′09″W
- Country: United States
- State: Michigan
- County: Ionia

Area
  - Total: 0.76 sq mi (1.96 km^{2})
  - Land: 0.71 sq mi (1.84 km^{2})
  - Water: 0.046 sq mi (0.12 km^{2})
- Elevation: 663 ft (202 m)

Population (2020)
  - Total: 646
  - Density: 907/sq mi (350.3/km^{2})
- Time zone: UTC-5 (Eastern (EST))
  - Summer (DST): UTC-4 (EDT)
- ZIP code: 48860
- Area code: 989
- FIPS code: 26-56080
- GNIS feature ID: 2399423
- Website: https://villageofmuirmi.gov/

Muir is a village in Lyons Township, Ionia County in the U.S. state of Michigan. As of the 2020 census, Muir had a population of 646.

== Geography ==
According to the United States Census Bureau, the village has a total area of 0.76 square miles (1.97 km^{2}), of which 0.71 square miles (1.84 km^{2}) is land and 0.05 square miles (0.13 km^{2}) is water.

== Demographics ==
Historical population
| Census | Pop. | Note | %± |
|---|---|---|---|
| 1860 | 216 | | — |
| 1880 | 714 | | — |
| 1890 | 490 | | −31.4% |
| 1900 | 506 | | 3.3% |
| 1910 | 463 | | −8.5% |
| 1920 | 363 | | −21.6% |
| 1930 | 448 | | 23.4% |
| 1940 | 447 | | −0.2% |
| 1950 | 466 | | 4.3% |
| 1960 | 610 | | 30.9% |
| 1970 | 617 | | 1.1% |
| 1980 | 698 | | 13.1% |
| 1990 | 667 | | −4.4% |
| 2000 | 634 | | −4.9% |
| 2010 | 604 | | −4.7% |
| 2020 | 646 | | 7.0% |
U.S. Decennial Census

=== 2010 census ===
As of the census of 2010, there were 604 people, 227 households, and 166 families living in the village. The population density was 850.7 inhabitants per square mile (328.5/km^{2}). There were 266 housing units at an average density of 374.6 per square mile (144.6/km^{2}). The racial makeup of the village was 94.7% White, 0.2% African American, 1.0% Native American, 1.5% Asian, 0.8% from other races, and 1.8% from two or more races. Hispanic or Latino of any race were 3.0% of the population.

There were 227 households, of which 40.5% had children under the age of 18 living with them, 45.4% were married couples living together, 18.9% had a female householder with no husband present, 8.8% had a male householder with no wife present, and 26.9% were non-families. 22.5% of all households were made up of individuals, and 8% had someone living alone who was 65 years of age or older. The average household size was 2.66 and the average family size was 2.98.

The median age in the village was 35.6 years. 27.2% of residents were under the age of 18; 8.1% were between the ages of 18 and 24; 27.7% were from 25 to 44; 26.5% were from 45 to 64; and 10.4% were 65 years of age or older. The gender makeup of the village was 49.7% male and 50.3% female.

=== 2000 census ===
As of the census of 2000, there were 634 people, 246 households, and 171 families living in the village. The population density was 830.5 inhabitants per square mile (320.7/km^{2}). There were 264 housing units at an average density of 345.8 per square mile (133.5/km^{2}). The racial makeup of the village was 96.06% White, 0.32% Native American, 0.95% from other races, and 2.68% from two or more races. Hispanic or Latino of any race were 2.37% of the population.

There were 246 households, out of which 39.8% had children under the age of 18 living with them, 44.7% were married couples living together, 17.9% had a female householder with no husband present, and 30.1% were non-families. 25.6% of all households were made up of individuals, and 10.6% had someone living alone who was 65 years of age or older. The average household size was 2.58 and the average family size was 2.99.

In the village, the population was spread out, with 29.7% under the age of 18, 10.4% from 18 to 24, 30.8% from 25 to 44, 19.6% from 45 to 64, and 9.6% who were 65 years of age or older. The median age was 33 years. For every 100 females, there were 94.5 males. For every 100 females age 18 and over, there were 91.4 males.

The median income for a household in the village was $30,096, and the median income for a family was $36,875. Males had a median income of $32,604 versus $21,500 for females. The per capita income for the village was $13,938. About 12.8% of families and 15.8% of the population were below the poverty line, including 18.5% of those under age 18 and none of those age 65 or over.

== Notable people ==
Billy Strings, musician
