= Boston Township, Michigan =

- Township
- Location within Michigan Location within the United States
- Coordinates: 42°54′18″N 85°14′23″W
- Country: United States
- State: Michigan
- County: Ionia

Area
  - Total: 35.9 sq mi (92.9 km^{2})
  - Land: 35.0 sq mi (90.6 km^{2})
  - Water: 0.89 sq mi (2.3 km^{2})
- Elevation: 863 ft (263 m)

Population (2020)
  - Total: 6,021
  - Density: 172/sq mi (66.5/km^{2})
- Time zone: UTC-5 (Eastern (EST))
  - Summer (DST): UTC-4 (EDT)
- FIPS code: 26-09680
- GNIS feature ID: 1625962
- Website: https://www.bostontwp.org/

Boston Township is a civil township of Ionia County in the U.S. state of Michigan. As of the 2020 census, the township population was 6,021.

== Communities ==
- Saranac is a village in the northeast corner of the township.

== Geography ==
According to the United States Census Bureau, the township has a total area of 35.9 square miles (93 km^{2}), of which 35.0 square miles (91 km^{2}) is land and 0.9 square miles (2.3 km^{2}) (2.51%) is water.

== Demographics ==
As of the census of 2000, there were 4,961 people, 1,881 households, and 1,356 families residing in the township. The population density was 141.8 inhabitants per square mile (54.7/km^{2}). There were 2,065 housing units at an average density of 59.0 per square mile (22.8/km^{2}). The racial makeup of the township was 97.72% White, 0.24% African American, 0.28% Native American, 0.20% Asian, 0.06% Pacific Islander, 0.52% from other races, and 0.97% from two or more races. Hispanic or Latino of any race were 1.94% of the population.

There were 1,881 households, out of which 35.4% had children under the age of 18 living with them, 60.2% were married couples living together, 8.1% had a female householder with no husband present, and 27.9% were non-families. 23.5% of all households were made up of individuals, and 10.2% had someone living alone who was 65 years of age or older. The average household size was 2.61 and the average family size was 3.09.

In the township the population was spread out, with 27.6% under the age of 18, 7.4% from 18 to 24, 30.3% from 25 to 44, 23.0% from 45 to 64, and 11.6% who were 65 years of age or older. The median age was 36 years. For every 100 females, there were 97.9 males. For every 100 females age 18 and over, there were 93.8 males.

The median income for a household in the township was $43,172, and the median income for a family was $48,297. Males had a median income of $38,545 versus $25,000 for females. The per capita income for the township was $18,836. About 3.9% of families and 6.7% of the population were below the poverty line, including 6.3% of those under age 18 and 11.9% of those age 65 or over.
