= Berlin Township, Ionia County, Michigan =

Berlin Township, Michigan
- Township
- Location within Michigan Location within the United States
- Coordinates: 42°54′28″N 85°7′19″W
- Country: United States
- State: Michigan
- County: Ionia

Area
  - Total: 41.9 sq mi (108.5 km^{2})
  - Land: 41.6 sq mi (107.8 km^{2})
  - Water: 0.27 sq mi (0.7 km^{2})
- Elevation: 840 ft (256 m)

Population (2020)
  - Total: 2,138
  - Density: 51.37/sq mi (19.83/km^{2})
- Time zone: UTC-5 (Eastern (EST))
  - Summer (DST): UTC-4 (EDT)
- FIPS code: 26-07700
- GNIS feature ID: 1625923
- Website: https://berlintwpioniami.gov/

Berlin Township is a civil township of Ionia County in the U.S. state of Michigan. As of the 2020 census, the township population was 2,138.

== History ==
Berlin Township was organized in 1839 with Alonzo Sessions as the first supervisor.

== Communities ==
- Berlin Center is an unincorporated community near the center of the township at 42°54′02″N 85°08′03″W.
- Doris was the name of a post office in this township from 1899 until 1901.
- Gridley was the name of a post office here from 1900 to 1901.
- The city of Ionia is adjacent to the northeast and has incorporated a small portion of land in the township.
- The village of Saranac is adjacent to the west.

== Geography ==
According to the United States Census Bureau, the township has a total area of 41.9 square miles (109 km^{2}), of which 41.6 square miles (108 km^{2}) is land and 0.3 square miles (0.78 km^{2}) (0.64%) is water.

== Demographics ==
As of the census of 2000, there were 2,787 people, 689 households, and 547 families residing in the township. The population density was 67.0 inhabitants per square mile (25.9/km^{2}). There were 724 housing units at an average density of 17.4 per square mile (6.7/km^{2}). The racial makeup of the township was 81.59% White, 13.81% African American, 1.40% Native American, 0.39% Asian, 0.79% from other races, and 2.01% from two or more races. Hispanic or Latino of any race were 2.22% of the population.

There were 689 households, out of which 36.3% had children under the age of 18 living with them, 68.7% were married couples living together, 7.3% had a female householder with no husband present, and 20.6% were non-families. 17.4% of all households were made up of individuals, and 7.7% had someone living alone who was 65 years of age or older. The average household size was 2.65 and the average family size was 2.98.

In the township the population was spread out, with 16.9% under the age of 18, 9.8% from 18 to 24, 40.1% from 25 to 44, 24.5% from 45 to 64, and 8.7% who were 65 years of age or older. The median age was 38 years. For every 100 females, there were 200.6 males. For every 100 females age 18 and over, there were 234.8 males.

The median income for a household in the township was $48,158, and the median income for a family was $55,852. Males had a median income of $40,867 versus $27,563 for females. The per capita income for the township was $16,780. About 4.0% of families and 5.9% of the population were below the poverty line, including 4.8% of those under age 18 and 6.8% of those age 65 or over.
