= Campbell Township, Michigan =

- Township
- Location within Michigan Location within the United States
- Coordinates: 42°49′13″N 85°15′8″W
- Country: United States
- State: Michigan
- County: Ionia

Area
  - Total: 35.9 sq mi (93.0 km^{2})
  - Land: 35.8 sq mi (92.6 km^{2})
  - Water: 0.15 sq mi (0.4 km^{2})
- Elevation: 890 ft (270 m)

Population (2020)
  - Total: 2,399
  - Density: 67.1/sq mi (25.9/km^{2})
- Time zone: UTC-5 (Eastern (EST))
  - Summer (DST): UTC-4 (EDT)
- ZIP codes: 48815 (Clarksville); 48849 (Lake Odessa); 49325 (Freeport)
- FIPS code: 26-12840
- GNIS feature ID: 1626028
- Website: https://www.campbelltownship.org/

Campbell Township is a civil township of Ionia County in the US state of Michigan. Its population was 2,399 at the 2020 census.

== Communities ==
There are several communities within Campbell Township:

- Elmdale is an unincorporated community, located at 42°51′13″N 85°18′40″W along the western boundary with Kent County. It was a station on the Detroit, Grand Rapids and Western Railroad. A post office operated there from January 1889 until May 1940.
- Clarksville is a village within the township. The Clarksville ZIP code serves the northern portion of the township.
- The southeastern and south central part of the township is served by the Lake Odessa ZIP code, 48849.
- The southwest portion of the township is served by the Freeport ZIP code, 49325.

== Geography ==
According to the United States Census Bureau, the township has a total area of 35.9 square miles (93 km^{2}), of which 35.8 square miles (93 km^{2}) is land and 0.2 square miles (0.52 km^{2}) (0.42%) is water.

== Demographics ==
As of the census of 2000, there were 2,243 people, 780 households, and 605 families residing in the township. The population density was 62.7 inhabitants per square mile (24.2/km^{2}). There were 830 housing units at an average density of 23.2 per square mile (9.0/km^{2}). The racial makeup of the township was 98.08% White, 0.18% African American, 0.22% Native American, 0.13% Asian, 0.45% from other races, and 0.94% from two or more races. Hispanic or Latino of any race were 1.34% of the population.

Of the 780 households, 40.9% had children under the age of 18 living with them, 67.6% were married couples living together, 6.9% had a female householder with no husband present, and 22.4% were non-families. 18.5% of all households were made up of individuals, and 8.6% had someone living alone who was 65 years of age or older. The average household size was 2.88 and the average family size was 3.26.

In the township the population was spread out, with 30.5% under the age of 18, 7.8% from 18 to 24, 30.6% from 25 to 44, 22.0% from 45 to 64, and 9.1% who were 65 years of age or older. The median age was 34 years. For every 100 females, there were 103.5 males. For every 100 females age 18 and over, there were 99.9 males.

The median income for a household in the township was $50,370, and the median income for a family was $58,167. Males had a median income of $40,264 versus $25,771 for females. The per capita income for the township was $20,122. About 4.7% of families and 6.2% of the population were below the poverty line, including 4.6% of those under age 18 and 11.7% of those age 65 or over.

== Education ==
A small section of the township is in Lowell Area Schools. Alto Elementary School serves that section, while Lowell Middle School and Lowell High School serve the entire district.
