= Belding, Michigan =

- City
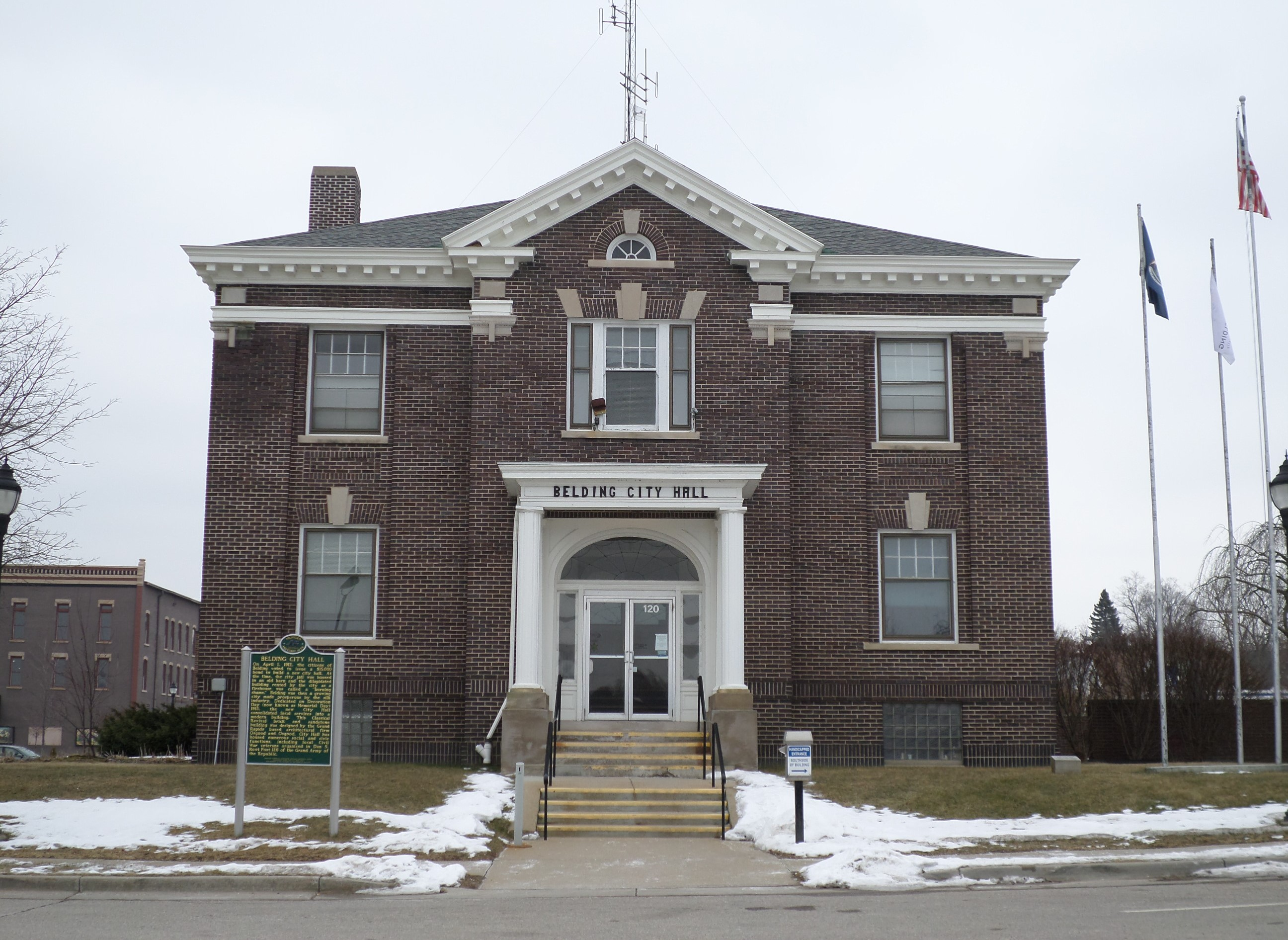
- Belding City Hall in January 2015

- Location of Belding, Michigan
- Coordinates: 43°05′48″N 85°13′59″W
- Country: United States
- State: Michigan
- County: Ionia

Area
  - Total: 4.91 sq mi (12.71 km^{2})
  - Land: 4.72 sq mi (12.23 km^{2})
  - Water: 0.18 sq mi (0.47 km^{2})
- Elevation: 771 ft (235 m)

Population (2020)
  - Total: 5,938
  - Density: 1,257.1/sq mi (485.36/km^{2})
- Time zone: UTC-5 (Eastern (EST))
  - Summer (DST): UTC-4 (EDT)
- ZIP codes: 48809, 48887
- Area code: 616
- FIPS code: 26-06900
- GNIS feature ID: 1625907
- Website: www.ci.belding.mi.us

Belding is a city in Ionia County in the U.S. state of Michigan, completely surrounded by Otisco Township, Michigan. The population was 5,937 at the 2020 census.

== History ==
In 1838, six years before John Green came to the area that later would bear his name, Levi Broas, Belding's first settler, arrived in the area. The community first was known as Broas Rapids, later Patterson Mills and even, during logging days, as Hog Wallow. The name Belding was chosen in 1871 to honor the Belding family.

== Geography ==
According to the United States Census Bureau, the city has a total area of 4.90 square miles (12.69 km^{2}), of which, 4.72 square miles (12.22 km^{2}) of it is land and 0.18 square miles (0.47 km^{2}) is water.

== Demographics ==
Historical population
Census	Pop.	Note	%±
1880	562		—
1890	1,730		207.8%
1900	3,282		89.7%
1910	4,119		25.5%
1920	3,911		−5.0%
1930	4,140		5.9%
1940	4,089		−1.2%
1950	4,436		8.5%
1960	4,887		10.2%
1970	5,121		4.8%
1980	5,634		10.0%
1990	5,969		5.9%
2000	5,877		−1.5%
2010	5,757		−2.0%
2020	5,938		3.1%
U.S. Decennial Census

=== 2020 census ===
As of the 2020 census, Belding had a population of 5,938. The median age was 36.6 years. 24.0% of residents were under the age of 18 and 15.6% of residents were 65 years of age or older. For every 100 females there were 99.4 males, and for every 100 females age 18 and over there were 95.0 males age 18 and over.

94.5% of residents lived in urban areas, while 5.5% lived in rural areas.

There were 2,304 households in Belding, of which 32.0% had children under the age of 18 living in them. Of all households, 41.3% were married-couple households, 19.2% were households with a male householder and no spouse or partner present, and 29.9% were households with a female householder and no spouse or partner present. About 30.2% of all households were made up of individuals and 12.9% had someone living alone who was 65 years of age or older.

There were 2,417 housing units, of which 4.7% were vacant. The homeowner vacancy rate was 1.1% and the rental vacancy rate was 5.5%.

Racial composition as of the 2020 census
Race	Number	Percent
White	5,359	90.2%
Black or African American	43	0.7%
American Indian and Alaska Native	30	0.5%
Asian	15	0.3%
Native Hawaiian and Other Pacific Islander	3	0.1%
Some other race	163	2.7%
Two or more races	325	5.5%
Hispanic or Latino (of any race)	353	5.9%

=== 2010 census ===
As of the census of 2010, there were 5,757 people, 2,161 households, and 1,473 families residing in the city. The population density was 1,219.7 inhabitants per square mile (470.9/km^{2}). There were 2,442 housing units at an average density of 517.4 per square mile (199.8/km^{2}). The racial makeup of the city was 95.2% White, 0.3% African American, 0.5% Native American, 0.5% Asian, 0.1% Pacific Islander, 1.6% from other races, and 1.8% from two or more races. Hispanic or Latino of any race were 5.0% of the population.

There were 2,161 households, of which 38.6% had children under the age of 18 living with them, 46.6% were married couples living together, 15.5% had a female householder with no husband present, 6.0% had a male householder with no wife present, and 31.8% were non-families. 26.3% of all households were made up of individuals, and 10.8% had someone living alone who was 65 years of age or older. The average household size was 2.61 and the average family size was 3.12.

The median age in the city was 33.7 years. 28.7% of residents were under the age of 18; 9% were between the ages of 18 and 24; 26.9% were from 25 to 44; 22.7% were from 45 to 64; and 12.7% were 65 years of age or older. The gender makeup of the city was 47.6% male and 52.4% female.

=== 2000 census ===
In 2000, the median income for a household in the city was $35,625, and the median income for a family was $44,813. Males had a median income of $39,280 versus $32,542 for females. The per capita income for the city was $16,899. About 13.4% of families and 16.3% of the population were below the poverty line, including 19.3% of those under age 18 and 12.3% of those age 65 or over.

== Historical sites ==
=== Belding Museum at the Belrockton ===
The Belding Museum is located in the historic Belrockton at 108 Hanover Street. The Bel, as it is known by locals, is a designated Michigan Historical Site. Built in 1906, the Belrockton is the last remaining boarding house of the three provided by the Belding Brothers and Company for its single female workers. A major silk manufacturer during the late nineteenth and early twentieth centuries, the company employed hundreds of young women and earned Belding the title of "Silk City of the World". Providing accommodations for one hundred residents and staff, the Belrockton Dormitory, a Classical Revival-inspired building, was erected at a cost of thirty thousand dollars. Following the closing of the company's silk mills in 1935, the "Bel" served as a residential training center for the National Youth Administration. In 1943, the building became a recreation center. The city of Belding purchased the structure in 1950 to serve as a community center. In 1987 it became the home of the Belding Museum. The Belding Museum is still up and running, hosting numerous local events.

=== Alvah N. Belding Memorial Library ===
The Alvah N. Belding Memorial Library is located at 302 E. Main Street, Belding, Michigan. Belding's first public library was organized in 1890 by a group of civic-minded women who were members of the Ladies Literary Club. A meager collection of books, some from personal libraries and some purchased from funds raised through strawberry festivals, 25¢ suppers, and subscription drives, was housed in a room above a store on west Main Street. After the disastrous fire of 1893 swept Main Street, the burned out library was reinstalled in a room over Connell's Drug Store and then later, in an upper room at City Hall. In 1914, upon a suggestion of local businessman Byron Brown, Alvah N. Belding of the Belding & Bros. Company, Silk Manufacturers, decided to build and give a library to the City of Belding. On March 21, 1917, the Belding City Council accepted his offer and agreed to maintain the building in like beauty and form as a library for all time.

== Education ==
Belding Area Schools operates public schools.

== Gus Macker basketball tournament ==
Belding is also the home of the Gus Macker 3 on 3 basketball tournament. At its peak, Belding's population would swell to approximately 100,000 temporary 'residents' during Macker weekends.

== Notable people ==
- Marie Zeigler, player in the All-American Girls Professional Baseball League
- Betty Smith, author of A Tree Grows in Brooklyn (novel), lived in Belding from 1923-24.
