= Ionia County, Michigan =

County in Michigan, United States

- County
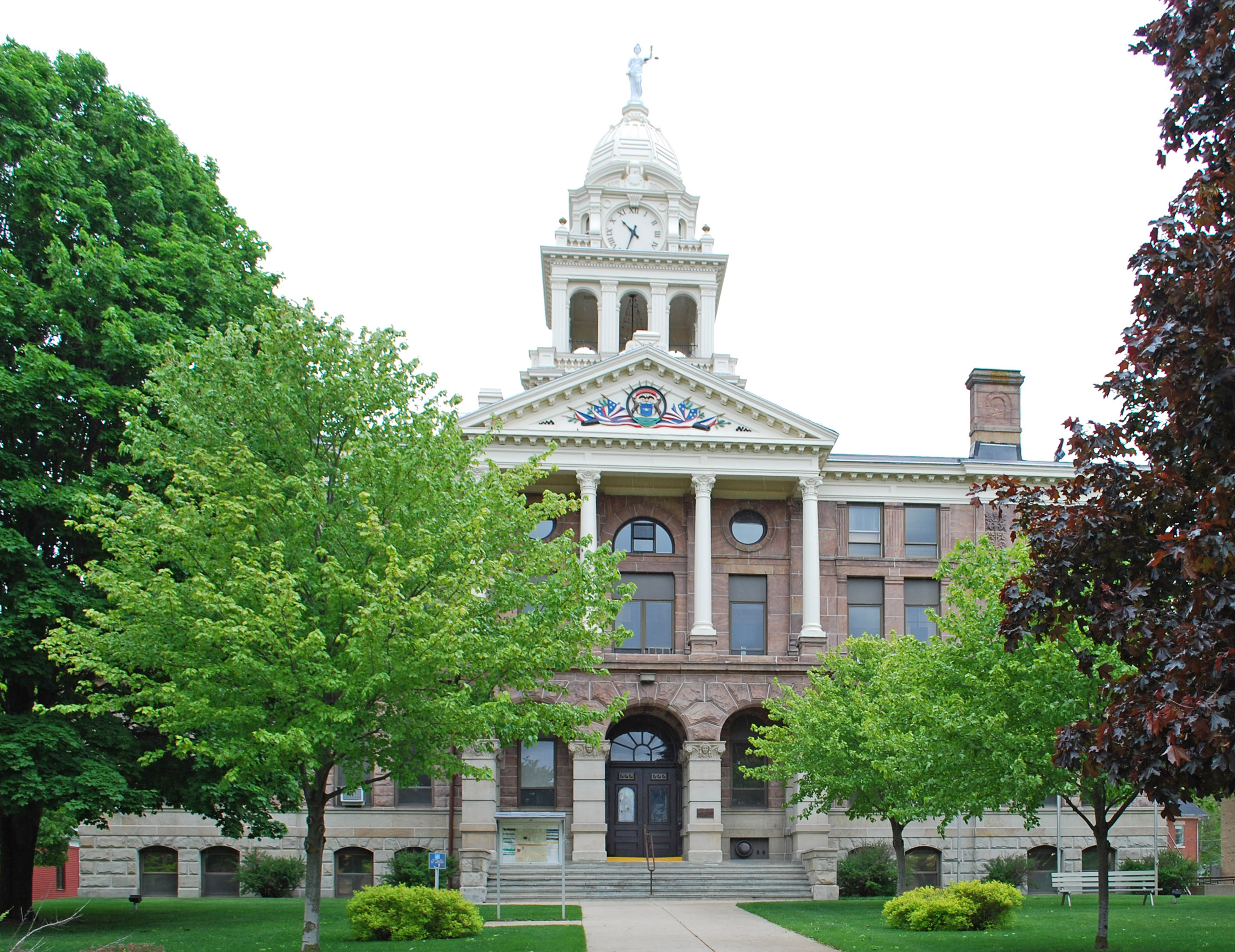
- Ionia County Courthouse in Ionia

- Seal

- Location within the U.S. state of Michigan
- Coordinates: 42°56′N 85°04′W
- Country: United States
- State: Michigan
- Founded: March 2, 1831 (created); 1837 (organized)
- Named for: Ionia
- Seat: Ionia
- Largest city: Ionia

Area
  - Total: 580 sq mi (1,500 km^{2})
  - Land: 571 sq mi (1,480 km^{2})
  - Water: 8.7 sq mi (23 km^{2}) 1.5%

Population (2020)
  - Total: 66,804
  - Estimate (2025): 66,557 ▼
  - Density: 117/sq mi (45.2/km^{2})
- Time zone: UTC−5 (Eastern)
  - Summer (DST): UTC−4 (EDT)
- Congressional district: 2nd
- Website: ioniacounty.org

Ionia County (/aɪˈoʊnjə/ eye-OH-nyə) is a county located in the U.S. state of Michigan. As of the 2020 census, the population was 66,804. The county seat is Ionia. The Ionia County Courthouse was designed by Claire Allen, a prominent southern Michigan architect.

Ionia County is part of the Grand Rapids-Kentwood metropolitan statistical area.

== History ==
The county is named for Ionia, a historic area of Greece.

== Geography ==
According to the US Census Bureau, the county has a total area of 580 square miles (1,500 km^{2}), of which 571 square miles (1,480 km^{2}) is land and 8.7 square miles (23 km^{2}) (1.5%) is water.

=== Adjacent counties ===
- Gratiot County – northeast
- Montcalm County – north
- Clinton County – east
- Kent County – west
- Eaton County – southeast
- Barry County – southwest

=== Major highways ===
- I-96 is an east–west freeway running through the heart of Ionia County. The freeway can be used to access Grand Rapids, to the west, and Lansing and Detroit, to the east.
- M-21 is an east–west highway that runs north of I-96. The highway runs through the city of Ionia.
- M-44 is an east–west highway that runs in the northwest of Ionia County, including access to Belding.
- M-50 is a highway in the southwest of Ionia County, following a largely east–west route. The highway runs through Lake Odessa.
- M-66 is the primary north–south thoroughfare in Ionia County. Running through the center of the county, the highway also passes through downtown Ionia. M-66 is one of Michigan's longest state trunkline highways, running from the Indiana border near Sturgis to Charlevoix, on Lake Michigan.
- M-91 is a highway in the northwest of Ionia County, beginning at M-44 near Belding and running north toward Greenville.
- US 16 is a former US Route that travelled east–west in Ionia County, along what is today known as Grand River Avenue. The highway was replaced by I-96 in 1962.

== Demographics ==
Historical population
Census	Pop.	Note	%±
1840	1,923		—
1850	7,597		295.1%
1860	16,682		119.6%
1870	27,681		65.9%
1880	33,872		22.4%
1890	32,801		−3.2%
1900	34,329		4.7%
1910	33,550		−2.3%
1920	33,087		−1.4%
1930	35,093		6.1%
1940	35,710		1.8%
1950	38,158		6.9%
1960	43,132		13.0%
1970	45,848		6.3%
1980	51,815		13.0%
1990	57,024		10.1%
2000	61,518		7.9%
2010	63,905		3.9%
2020	66,804		4.5%
2025 (est.)	66,557	▼	−0.4%
US Decennial Census; 1790–1960 1900–1990; 1990–2000 2010–2018

=== Racial and ethnic composition ===
Ionia County, Michigan – Racial and ethnic composition Note: the US Census treats Hispanic/Latino as an ethnic category. This table excludes Latinos from the racial categories and assigns them to a separate category. Hispanics/Latinos may be of any race.
Race / Ethnicity (NH = Non-Hispanic)	Pop 1980	Pop 1990	Pop 2000	Pop 2010	Pop 2020	% 1980	% 1990	% 2000	% 2010	% 2020
White alone (NH)	48,930	52,553	55,749	56,962	57,617	94.43%	92.16%	90.62%	89.14%	86.25%
Black or African American alone (NH)	1,610	2,954	2,759	2,962	3,210	3.11%	5.18%	4.48%	4.64%	4.81%
Native American or Alaska Native alone (NH)	188	212	286	230	246	0.36%	0.37%	0.46%	0.36%	0.37%
Asian alone (NH)	104	118	194	241	229	0.20%	0.21%	0.32%	0.38%	0.34%
Native Hawaiian or Pacific Islander alone (NH)	x	x	7	6	5	x	x	0.01%	0.01%	0.01%
Other race alone (NH)	76	11	32	27	121	0.15%	0.02%	0.05%	0.04%	0.18%
Mixed race or Multiracial (NH)	x	x	780	686	2,012	x	x	1.27%	1.07%	3.01%
Hispanic or Latino (any race)	907	1,176	1,711	2,791	3,364	1.75%	2.06%	2.78%	4.37%	5.04%
Total	51,815	57,024	61,518	63,905	66,804	100.00%	100.00%	100.00%	100.00%	100.00%

=== 2020 census ===
As of the 2020 census, the county had a population of 66,804. The median age was 39.3 years. 21.7% of residents were under the age of 18 and 15.2% of residents were 65 years of age or older. For every 100 females there were 124.2 males, and for every 100 females age 18 and over there were 129.0 males age 18 and over.

The racial makeup of the county was 88.2% White, 4.8% Black or African American, 0.5% American Indian and Alaska Native, 0.3% Asian, <0.1% Native Hawaiian and Pacific Islander, 1.6% from some other race, and 4.5% from two or more races. Hispanic or Latino residents of any race comprised 5.0% of the population.

39.0% of residents lived in urban areas, while 61.0% lived in rural areas.

There were 23,108 households in the county, of which 31.5% had children under the age of 18 living in them. Of all households, 52.5% were married-couple households, 17.6% were households with a male householder and no spouse or partner present, and 21.3% were households with a female householder and no spouse or partner present. About 24.7% of all households were made up of individuals and 10.7% had someone living alone who was 65 years of age or older.

There were 24,638 housing units, of which 6.2% were vacant. Among occupied housing units, 78.4% were owner-occupied and 21.6% were renter-occupied. The homeowner vacancy rate was 1.1% and the rental vacancy rate was 5.3%.

=== 2000 census ===
As of the 2000 census, there were 61,518 people, 20,606 households, and 15,145 families residing in the county. The population density was 107 inhabitants per square mile (41/km^{2}). There were 22,006 housing units at an average density of 38 per square mile (15/km^{2}). The racial makeup of the county was 91.96% White, 4.56% Black or African American, 0.56% Native American, 0.32% Asian, 0.01% Pacific Islander, 1.04% from other races, and 1.55% from two or more races. 2.78% of the population were Hispanic or Latino of any race. 29.0% were of German, 14.7% American, 11.6% English, 8.9% Irish and 5.3% Dutch ancestry. 96.3% spoke English and 2.6% Spanish as their first language.

There were 20,606 households, out of which 38.10% had children under the age of 18 living with them, 58.70% were married couples living together, 10.10% had a female householder with no husband present, and 26.50% were non-families. 21.90% of all households were made up of individuals, and 8.90% had someone living alone who was 65 years of age or older. The average household size was 2.70 and the average family size was 3.15.

The county's population spread included 26.90% under the age of 18, 11.50% from 18 to 24, 31.00% from 25 to 44, 20.50% from 45 to 64, and 10.00% who were 65 years of age or older. The median age was 33 years. For every 100 females, there were 115.20 males. For every 100 females age 18 and over, there were 120.40 males.

The median income for a household in the county was $43,074, and the median income for a family was $49,797. Males had a median income of $36,995 versus $25,443 for females. The per capita income for the county was $17,451. About 6.80% of families and 8.70% of the population were below the poverty line, including 10.40% of those under age 18 and 8.10% of those age 65 or over.

== Government ==
Ionia County has been reliably Republican from the beginning. Since 1884, the Republican Party nominee has carried the county vote in 82% of the elections (29 of 35 elections).

United States presidential election results for Ionia County, Michigan
Year	Republican		Democratic		Third party(ies)	
Year	No.	%	No.	%	No.	%
1884	3,552	45.10%	3,814	48.43%	510	6.48%
1888	4,436	50.95%	3,779	43.41%	491	5.64%
1892	4,288	49.45%	3,779	43.58%	604	6.97%
1896	4,593	48.35%	4,757	50.08%	149	1.57%
1900	5,101	54.31%	4,055	43.18%	236	2.51%
1904	5,440	63.81%	2,729	32.01%	356	4.18%
1908	4,584	54.77%	3,232	38.61%	554	6.62%
1912	2,049	26.50%	2,757	35.66%	2,926	37.84%
1916	3,950	48.36%	3,911	47.88%	307	3.76%
1920	7,977	67.59%	3,395	28.77%	430	3.64%
1924	9,502	73.21%	2,821	21.74%	656	5.05%
1928	9,471	74.91%	3,089	24.43%	83	0.66%
1932	6,074	40.23%	8,695	57.58%	331	2.19%
1936	6,487	43.88%	7,140	48.30%	1,155	7.81%
1940	9,439	63.28%	5,399	36.20%	78	0.52%
1944	9,331	67.06%	4,437	31.89%	146	1.05%
1948	7,970	62.60%	4,450	34.95%	311	2.44%
1952	10,970	69.35%	4,722	29.85%	127	0.80%
1956	11,001	68.76%	4,952	30.95%	46	0.29%
1960	10,405	61.81%	6,377	37.88%	52	0.31%
1964	5,698	35.36%	10,362	64.31%	53	0.33%
1968	8,625	54.01%	6,055	37.92%	1,288	8.07%
1972	10,898	62.57%	6,240	35.83%	278	1.60%
1976	11,737	62.46%	6,820	36.29%	234	1.25%
1980	12,040	57.38%	7,039	33.55%	1,903	9.07%
1984	14,162	70.69%	5,735	28.62%	138	0.69%
1988	12,028	59.05%	8,160	40.06%	181	0.89%
1992	9,135	38.35%	8,370	35.14%	6,317	26.52%
1996	9,574	44.63%	9,261	43.17%	2,617	12.20%
2000	13,915	58.05%	9,481	39.55%	574	2.39%
2004	16,621	60.18%	10,647	38.55%	350	1.27%
2008	14,156	51.74%	12,565	45.93%	638	2.33%
2012	14,315	55.36%	11,018	42.61%	523	2.02%
2016	16,635	61.52%	8,352	30.89%	2,052	7.59%
2020	20,657	64.13%	10,901	33.84%	651	2.02%
2024	22,179	65.19%	11,338	33.33%	504	1.48%

United States Senate election results for Ionia County, Michigan1
Year	Republican		Democratic		Third party(ies)	
Year	No.	%	No.	%	No.	%
2024	21,241	63.31%	11,253	33.54%	1,059	3.16%

Michigan Gubernatorial election results for Ionia County
Year	Republican		Democratic		Third party(ies)	
Year	No.	%	No.	%	No.	%
2022	15,786	58.02%	10,845	39.86%	577	2.12%

The county government operates the jail, maintains rural roads, operates the major local courts, records deeds, mortgages, and vital records, administers public health regulations, and participates with the state in the provision of social services. The county board of commissioners controls the budget and has limited authority to make laws or ordinances. In Michigan, most local government functions—police and fire, building and zoning, tax assessment, street maintenance, etc.—are the responsibility of individual cities and townships.

=== Elected officials ===
- Prosecuting attorney: Kyle B. Butler
- Sheriff: Charlie Noll
- County clerk: Greg Geiger
- County treasurer: Judith Clark
- Register of deeds: Rhonda Lake
- Drain commissioner: Robert Rose
- County Commissioner District 1: David Hodges
- County Commissioner District 2: Larry Tiejema
- County Commissioner District 3: Karen Banks
- County Commissioner District 4: Ally Cook
- County Commissioner District 5: Scott Wirtz
- County Commissioner District 6: Jack Shattuck
- County Commissioner District 7: Georgia Sharp

(information as of February 2023)

== Communities ==
=== Cities ===
- Belding
- Ionia (county seat)
- Portland

=== Villages ===
- Clarksville
- Hubbardston (part)
- Lake Odessa
- Lyons
- Muir
- Pewamo
- Saranac

=== Townships ===
- Berlin Township
- Boston Township
- Campbell Township
- Danby Township
- Easton Township
- Ionia Township
- Keene Township
- Lyons Township
- North Plains Township
- Odessa Township
- Orange Township
- Orleans Township
- Otisco Township
- Portland Township
- Ronald Township
- Sebewa Township

=== Census-designated place ===
- Palo

=== Unincorporated communities ===
- Berlin Center
- Collins
- Cooks Corners
- Dildine
- Elmdale
- Matherton
- Orleans
- Sebewa
- Shiloh
- Smyrna

== Education ==
K-12 school districts include:

- Belding Area Schools
- Carson City-Crystal Area School District
- Central Montcalm Public Schools
- Grand Ledge Public Schools
- Greenville Public Schools
- Ionia Public Schools
- Lakewood Public Schools
- Lowell Area Schools
- Pewamo-Westphalia Community School District
- Portland Public School District
- Saranac Community Schools
- Thornapple Kellogg School District

Elementary school districts include:

- Berlin Township School District 3
- Easton Township School District 6
- Ionia Township School District 2

== See also ==
- List of Michigan State Historic Sites in Ionia County
- National Register of Historic Places listings in Ionia County, Michigan
