= Keene Township, Michigan =

- Township
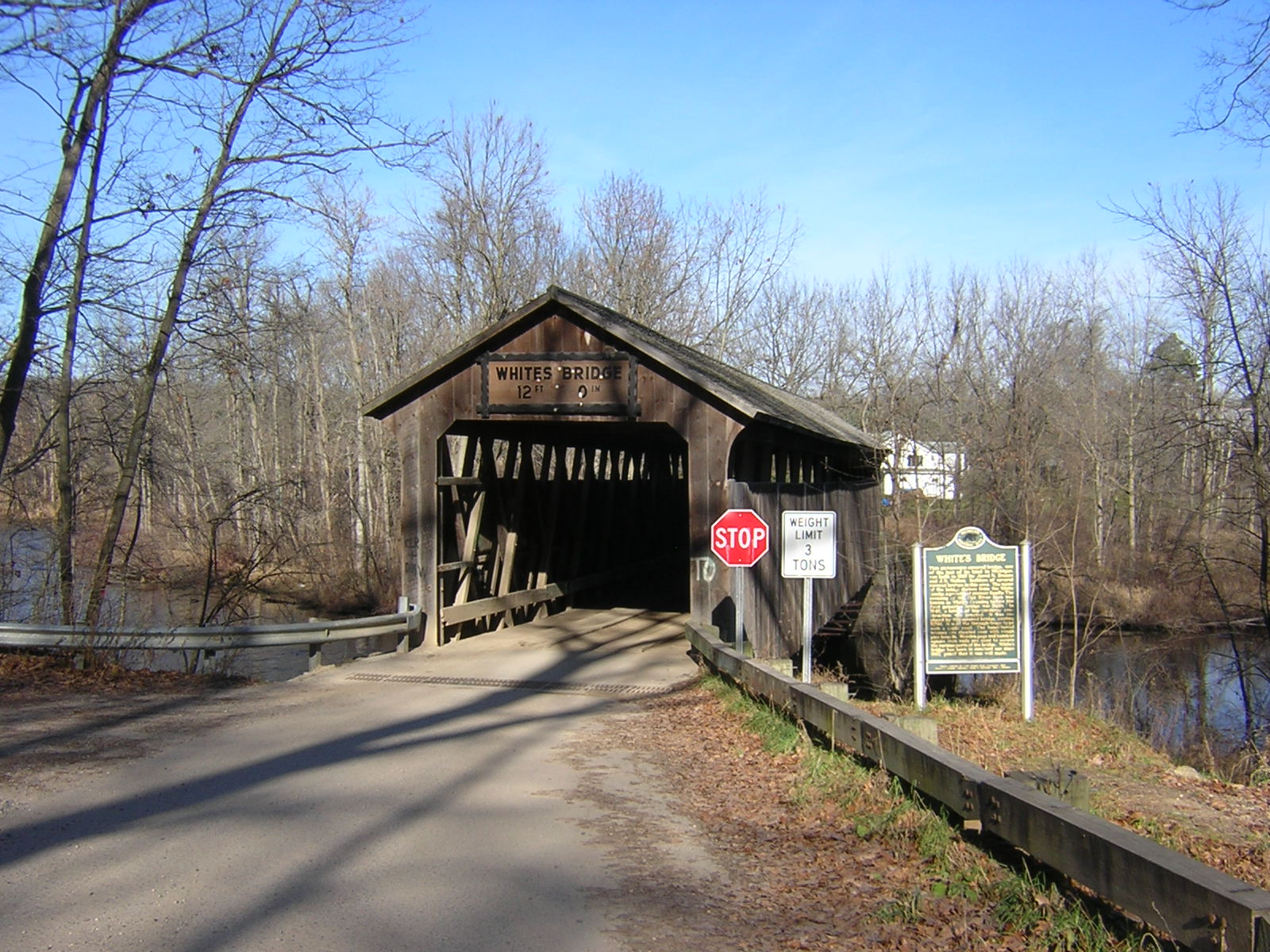
- Whites Bridge, which crosses the Flat River

- Location within Michigan Location within the United States
- Coordinates: 42°59′7″N 85°15′45″W
- Country: United States
- State: Michigan
- County: Ionia

Area
  - Total: 36.0 sq mi (93.2 km^{2})
  - Land: 35.7 sq mi (92.5 km^{2})
  - Water: 0.27 sq mi (0.7 km^{2})
- Elevation: 866 ft (264 m)

Population (2020)
  - Total: 1,730
  - Density: 48.4/sq mi (18.7/km^{2})
- Time zone: UTC-5 (Eastern (EST))
  - Summer (DST): UTC-4 (EDT)
- FIPS code: 26-42520
- GNIS feature ID: 1626556
- Website: https://keenetownshipmi.gov/

Keene Township is a civil township of Ionia County in the U.S. state of Michigan. The population was 1,730 at the 2020 census.

== Geography ==
According to the United States Census Bureau, the township has a total area of 36.0 square miles (93 km^{2}), of which 35.7 square miles (92 km^{2}) is land and 0.3 square miles (0.78 km^{2}) (0.78%) is water.

== Communities ==
- Dickertown was an unincorporated community in the township.

== Demographics ==
As of the census of 2000, there were 1,660 people, 542 households, and 448 families residing in the township. The population density was 46.5 inhabitants per square mile (18.0/km^{2}). There were 568 housing units at an average density of 15.9 per square mile (6.1/km^{2}). The racial makeup of the township was 96.33% White, 0.72% Native American, 0.06% Asian, 1.93% from other races, and 0.96% from two or more races. Hispanic or Latino of any race were 3.25% of the population.

There were 542 households, out of which 45.9% had children under the age of 18 living with them, 73.2% were married couples living together, 4.8% had a female householder with no husband present, and 17.3% were non-families. 13.7% of all households were made up of individuals, and 4.1% had someone living alone who was 65 years of age or older. The average household size was 3.02 and the average family size was 3.32.

In the township the population was spread out, with 32.7% under the age of 18, 7.3% from 18 to 24, 31.7% from 25 to 44, 21.1% from 45 to 64, and 7.1% who were 65 years of age or older. The median age was 34 years. For every 100 females, there were 109.1 males. For every 100 females age 18 and over, there were 104.6 males.

The median income for a household in the township was $50,114, and the median income for a family was $54,423. Males had a median income of $37,875 versus $24,917 for females. The per capita income for the township was $18,017. About 4.5% of families and 5.8% of the population were below the poverty line, including 7.0% of those under age 18 and 0.9% of those age 65 or over.
