= Orleans Township, Michigan =

- Township
- Location within Michigan Location within the United States
- Coordinates: 43°5′8″N 85°7′31″W
- Country: United States
- State: Michigan
- County: Ionia

Area
  - Total: 36.2 sq mi (93.8 km^{2})
  - Land: 35.5 sq mi (92.0 km^{2})
  - Water: 0.73 sq mi (1.9 km^{2})
- Elevation: 856 ft (261 m)

Population (2020)
  - Total: 2,664
  - Density: 75.0/sq mi (29.0/km^{2})
- Time zone: UTC-5 (Eastern (EST))
  - Summer (DST): UTC-4 (EDT)
- ZIP code: 48865
- Area code: 616
- FIPS code: 26-61160
- GNIS feature ID: 1626860
- Website: https://www.orleanstwp.com/

Orleans Township is a civil township of Ionia County in the U.S. state of Michigan. The population was 2,664 at the 2020 census.

== Geography ==
According to the United States Census Bureau, the township has a total area of 36.2 square miles (94 km^{2}), of which 35.5 square miles (92 km^{2}) is land and 0.7 square miles (1.8 km^{2}) (1.99%) is water.

== Communities ==
- Chadwick was a community started by Charles Chadwick in 1856. When the Detroit, Lansing and Northern Railroad was built in 1872 Chadwick got a depot on the railroad located here. It had a post office from 1872 until 1907.
- Orleans is an unincorporated community at 43°4′7.12″N 85°8′6.04″W. A post office at this location was established in 1844, named Wheatland. In 1868, the post office was renamed Orleans, after Orleans County, New York, from which a number of settlers originated. In 1870, a depot on the Detroit, Lansing and Northern Railroad opened in Orleans. In 1871, Orleans was platted as Palmer, however the name was changed shortly thereafter.
- Shiloh is an unincorporated community at 43°6′17.12″N 85°5′6.04″W. A post office at this location was established in 1877 as Smith's Crossing, and was the site of a station on the Stanton branch of the Ionia and Lansing Railroad. In 1877, the community changed its name in honor of the Battle of Shiloh, an 1862 battle of the American Civil War.

== Demographics ==
As of the census of 2000, there were 2,736 people, 985 households, and 743 families residing in the township. The population density was 77.0 inhabitants per square mile (29.7/km^{2}). There were 1,167 housing units at an average density of 32.9 per square mile (12.7/km^{2}). The racial makeup of the township was 98.32% White, 0.07% African American, 0.37% Native American, 0.15% Asian, 0.04% Pacific Islander, 0.44% from other races, and 0.62% from two or more races. Hispanic or Latino of any race were 1.57% of the population.

There were 985 households, out of which 38.3% had children under the age of 18 living with them, 59.7% were married couples living together, 8.4% had a female householder with no husband present, and 24.5% were non-families. 18.9% of all households were made up of individuals, and 5.5% had someone living alone who was 65 years of age or older. The average household size was 2.77 and the average family size was 3.11.

In the township the population was spread out, with 28.7% under the age of 18, 8.9% from 18 to 24, 31.0% from 25 to 44, 22.9% from 45 to 64, and 8.5% who were 65 years of age or older. The median age was 34 years. For every 100 females, there were 107.4 males. For every 100 females age 18 and over, there were 106.8 males.

The median income for a household in the township was $42,665, and the median income for a family was $46,488. Males had a median income of $36,326 versus $24,360 for females. The per capita income for the township was $17,425. About 7.4% of families and 8.5% of the population were below the poverty line, including 9.5% of those under age 18 and 12.8% of those age 65 or over.
