= Easton Township, Michigan =

- Township
- Location within Michigan Location within the United States
- Coordinates: 42°59′41″N 85°7′46″W
- Country: United States
- State: Michigan
- County: Ionia

Area
  - Total: 28.6 sq mi (74.0 km^{2})
  - Land: 28.4 sq mi (73.6 km^{2})
  - Water: 0.15 sq mi (0.4 km^{2})
- Elevation: 837 ft (255 m)

Population (2020)
  - Total: 3,058
  - Density: 108/sq mi (41.5/km^{2})
- Time zone: UTC-5 (Eastern (EST))
  - Summer (DST): UTC-4 (EDT)
- FIPS code: 26-24220
- GNIS feature ID: 1626208
- Website: http://www.eastontownship.org/

Easton Township is a civil township of Ionia County in the U.S. state of Michigan. The population was 3,058 at the 2020 census.

== History ==
Easton Township was established in 1843.

== Communities ==
- Dildine is a hamlet in the township. It had a post office from 1899 until 1902.

== Geography ==
According to the United States Census Bureau, the township has a total area of 28.6 square miles (74 km^{2}), of which 28.4 square miles (74 km^{2}) is land and 0.2 square miles (0.52 km^{2}) (0.59%) is water.

== Demographics ==
As of the census of 2000, there were 2,835 people, 1,097 households, and 796 families residing in the township. The population density was 99.8 inhabitants per square mile (38.5/km^{2}). There were 1,161 housing units at an average density of 40.9 per square mile (15.8/km^{2}). The racial makeup of the township was 97.07% White, 0.25% African American, 0.21% Native American, 0.32% Asian, 1.09% from other races, and 1.06% from two or more races. Hispanic or Latino of any race were 2.57% of the population.

There were 1,097 households, out of which 31.4% had children under the age of 18 living with them, 58.5% were married couples living together, 9.5% had a female householder with no husband present, and 27.4% were non-families. 21.7% of all households were made up of individuals, and 10.2% had someone living alone who was 65 years of age or older. The average household size was 2.58 and the average family size was 2.95.

In the township the population was spread out, with 25.4% under the age of 18, 8.4% from 18 to 24, 27.7% from 25 to 44, 24.1% from 45 to 64, and 14.4% who were 65 years of age or older. The median age was 38 years. For every 100 females, there were 94.8 males. For every 100 females age 18 and over, there were 93.8 males.

The median income for a household in the township was $40,493, and the median income for a family was $45,857. Males had a median income of $36,547 versus $26,198 for females. The per capita income for the township was $19,942. About 7.8% of families and 9.7% of the population were below the poverty line, including 14.1% of those under age 18 and 5.2% of those age 65 or over.
