= List of covered bridges in Michigan =

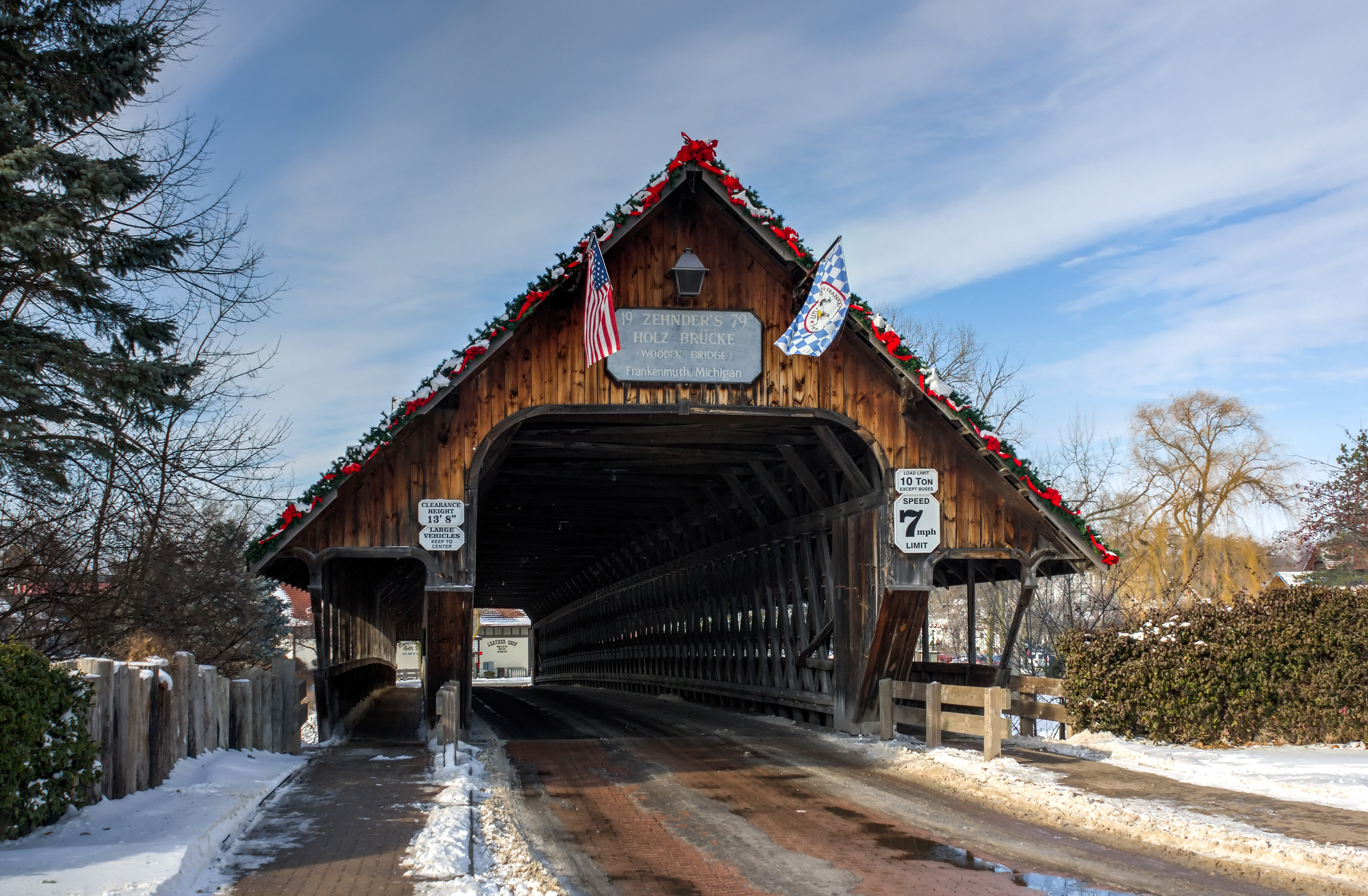
Entrance to Zehnder's Covered Bridge or Zehnder's Holz Brucke, Frankenmuth, Michigan.

This is a partial list of wooden covered bridges in the U.S. state of Michigan. These covered bridges may be listed on the National Register of Historic Places and as Michigan State Historic Sites.

Name	Location	Built	Length (ft)	Length (m)	Type	Spans	Notes
Ackley covered bridge	Greenfield Village, Dearborn, Wayne County; 42°18′12.90″N 83°14′2.68″W	1832	72	22	Queen post	artificial stream	Originally spanned Enlow Fork along the Greene–Washington county line in Southwestern Pennsylvania and removed to Greenfield Village in 1937.
Ada Covered Bridge	Ada, Kent County; 42°57′8.92″N 85°29′10.77″W	1867 rebuilt 1980	125	38	Brown truss	Thornapple River	Listed on both the Michigan Historic Register and on the National Register of Historic Places
Augusta Covered Bridge	Augusta, Kalamazoo County; 42°20′16″N 85°21′06″W	1973	32	9.8	Queen post	Augusta Creek	
Fallasburg Covered Bridge	Vergennes Township, Kent County; 42°58′51″N 85°19′38″W	1871	100	30	Brown truss	Flat River	Open to vehicle traffic; listed on both the Michigan Historic Register and on the National Register of Historic Places
Langley Covered Bridge	Centreville, St. Joseph County; 41°58′2″N 85°31′41″W	1887	282	86	Howe truss	St. Joseph River	Open to vehicle traffic; listed on both the Michigan Historic Register and on the National Register of Historic Places
Nichols Covered Bridge	Kal-Haven Trail, South Haven, Van Buren County; 42°25′04″N 86°15′01″W	1988 (1870)	108	33	Long truss	Black River	Built upon a former Kalamazoo and South Haven Railroad trestle bridge
Whites Bridge	Keene Township, Ionia County; 43°00′54.47″N 85°17′56.87″W	1869, rebuilt 2020	120	37	Brown truss	Flat River	Listed with both the Michigan Historic Register and National Register of Historic Places; burned down due to arson on July 7, 2013; construction of a replica bridge approved in July 2016 and completed in 2020
Zehnder's Holz Brucke	Frankenmuth, Saginaw County; 43°19′30″N 83°44′22″W	1979	239	73	Towne's Lattice	Cass River	Open to vehicle traffic
