= Fallasburg Historic District =

- U.S. National Register of Historic Places
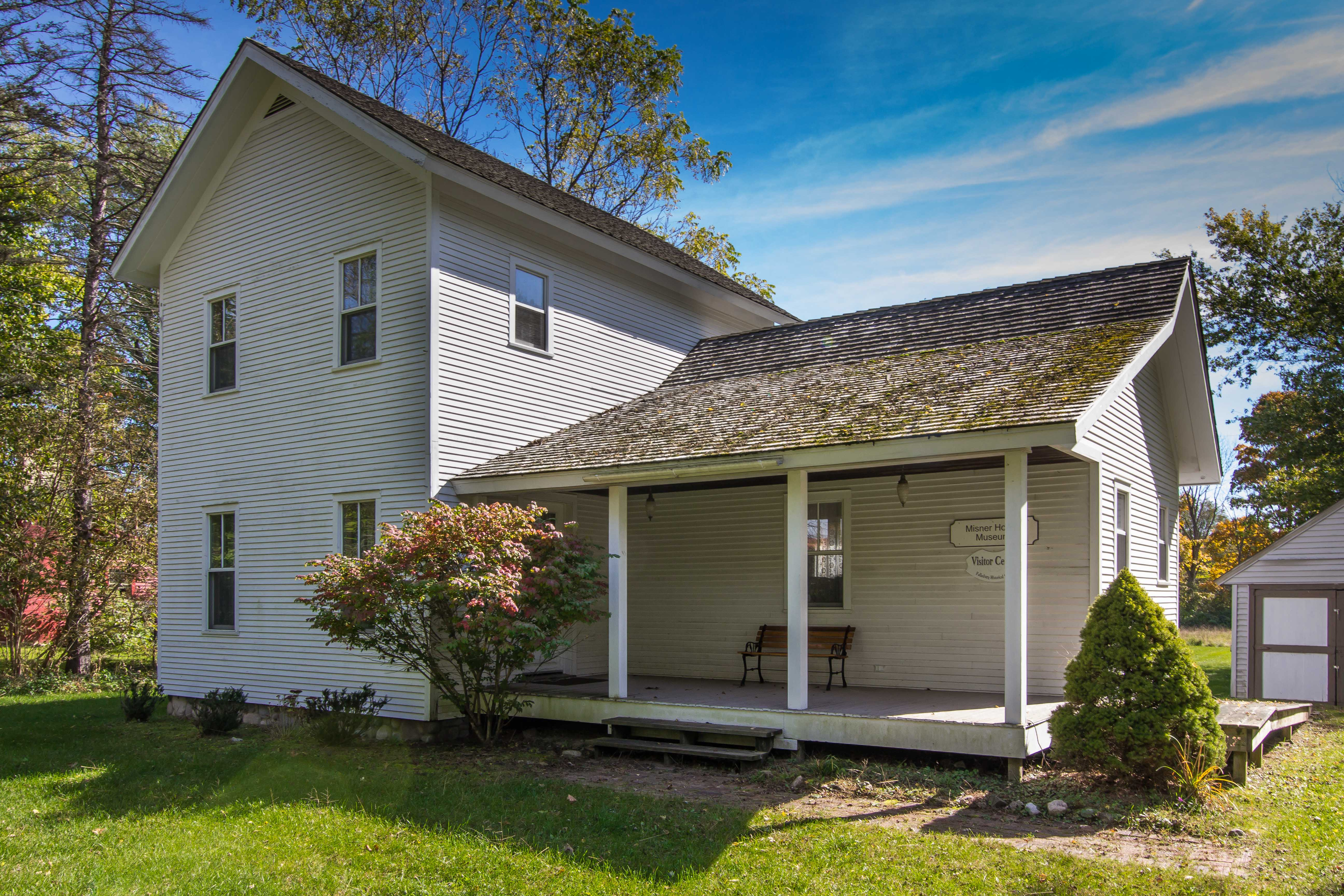
- Misner House Museum
- Interactive map
- Location: Covered Bridge Rd., Vergennes Township, Michigan
- Coordinates: 42°58′56″N 85°19′24″W
- Area: 33 acres (13 ha)
- Built: 1839
- Architectural style: Greek Revival
- NRHP reference No.: 98001217
- Added to NRHP: March 31, 1999

The Fallasburg Historic District is a historic district containing the remaining portions of a nineteenth century hamlet surrounding the remains of a sawmill and gristmill. The district is located near the Fallasburg Bridge, where Covered Bridge Road crosses the Flat River in Vergennes Township, Michigan. It was listed on the National Register of Historic Places in 1999.

== History ==
In about 1837, brothers John Wesley (1812–96) and Silas S. Fallass came to West Michigan from Tompkins County, New York. The area was being surveyed, and in 1839 was opened for purchase. The Fallass brothers acquired by pre-emption a section of land where Fallasburg is now located. Later that year, they constructed a sawmill on the Flat River, and in 1840 constructed a matching gristmill. J. Wesley Fallass built his own house soon after, and the unplatted hamlet of Fallassburgh (later Fallasburg) prospered as more people moved to the area surrounding the mills. A school was constructed in 1842, and a post office was established in 1849. By 1860 there were two general stores in the small village, as well as a blacksmith and wagonmaker. In 1864, the saw mill was purchased by Charles Hecox, who began a small chair factory. By the same time, the gristmill had five employees, and did nearly $20,000 in business every year for surrounding farmers. A new school was constructed in 1867. In 1875, John Wesley Fallass's sons took over operation of the mill.

However, the 1850s and 1860s were the high point for Fallasburg's economy. Soon the railroad network criss-crossed Michigan, making neighboring Lowell a boomtown, but bypassing Fallasburg completely. At the same time, the sawmill closed and was torn down in 1878. The gristmill, now competing with more modern mills, declined and was torn down in 1912. Several businesses and residences were destroyed by fire, and in 1905 the post office was closed.

Even though Fallasburg declined in the last 1800s and early 1900s, it did not disappear. Because it was a somewhat isolated location and much of the area was owned by local government, the remnants of the hamlet survived, reasonably intact, into the 21st century. In addition, in later years, the Fallasburg Historical Society was dedicated to preserving the site and its open spaces from development. Thus, Fallasburg is notable as one of the few pioneer-era settlements in Michigan which survived the disruption of the railroads with a substantial portion of its historic character intact.

== Description ==
The Fallasburg Historic District contains 14 historic structures, as well as a cemetery and the remains of a sawmill and gristmill. The structures include 12 houses, a schoolhouse, and Fallasburg Bridge. These structures primarily date from the early 1840s to the late 1860s, and are vernacular frame buildings with little decoration. Some have simple Greek Revival details, but only two structures have even the basic Greek Revival gable returns.
