= Fallasburg Bridge =

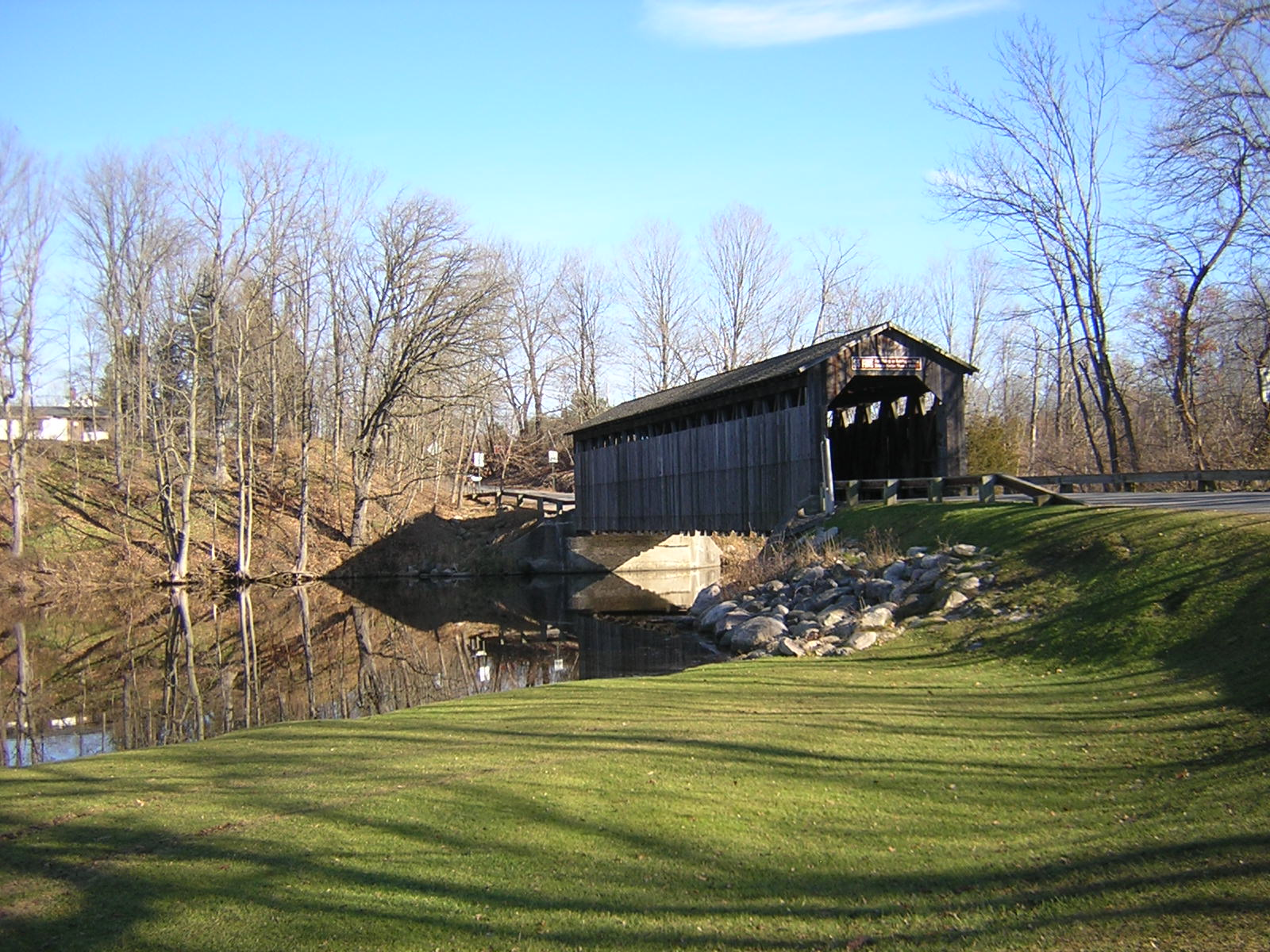
- East Approach
- Coordinates: 42°58′52″N 85°19′37″W
- Carries: Covered Bridge Road
- Crosses: Flat River
- Locale: Lowell, Michigan
- Maintained by: Kent County Road Commission

Characteristics
- Design: Brown truss Covered bridge
- Total length: 100 feet (30 m)
- Longest span: 97.8 feet (29.8 m)
- Load limit: 3 short tons (2.7 t)

History
- Opened: 1871
- Closed: in use

Statistics
- Toll: no
- Fallasburg Covered Bridge
- U.S. National Register of Historic Places
- Michigan State Historic Site
- Location within Michigan Location within the United States
- Nearest city: Lowell, Michigan
- Coordinates: 42°58′51″N 85°19′38″W
- Built by: Jared N. Bresee
- NRHP reference No.: 72000627
- Added to NRHP: March 16, 1972

Location
- Interactive map of Fallasburg Bridge

Fallasburg Bridge (alternatively Fallassburgh Bridge) is a 100-foot (30 m) span Brown truss covered bridge, erected in 1871 in Vergennes Township, Michigan, United States, 5 miles (8.0 km) north of Lowell on the Flat River. Carrying Covered Bridge Road across the Flat, it is located in the Fallasburg Historical District south of Whites Bridge and Smyrna. It is listed on the National Register of Historic Places, and along with Whites Bridge, Langley Covered Bridge, and Zehnder's Holz Brucke, is one of only four Michigan covered bridges open to vehicle traffic.

== Design ==
The bridge uses the Brown truss system, a through truss consisting of diagonal compression beams and (optionally) almost vertical tension members (slanting in at the top toward the center of the span). This system was patented by Josiah Brown of Buffalo, New York, in 1857. The Brown truss is similar to the Howe arrangement of "X" bracing and counter bracing, but uses lighter members and less timber. It contains no upright compression members and uses no iron except for bolt connectors at the timber intersections. Builders (Note: Bresee for this bridge, Bresee and Walker for Whites Bridge, William Holmes for Ada Covered Bridge) used the Brown truss successfully in at least four covered bridges in Michigan, three of which (Ada Covered Bridge, Whites Bridge and this one) are still in existence. The Brown truss was thus briefly popular in Michigan but did not gain wide acceptance elsewhere.

The bridge currently rests on concrete and fieldstone footings at each end put in place in 1905. As is typical for covered bridges, it is a frame structure with a gabled roof that is covered with creosote shingles. Its construction is of the through-truss type, and the white pine (sourced from Greenville, Michigan) trusses are completely sheathed on the outside with rough pine boards. The floor is 14 feet (4.3 m) wide and 100 feet (30 m) long and the bridge has an inside clearance of 12 feet (3.7 m).

The bridge has warning signs on each portal: "$5 fine for riding or driving on this bridge faster than a walk."

== History ==
This location along the Flat was settled by two brothers from Tompkins County, New York. John W. and Silas S. Fallas settled here in 1837, founding the village, a stop on the main stage route from Ionia to Grand Rapids, and constructing a chair factory (considered an important precursor to the furniture industry in the Grand Rapids area), saw mill and grist mill.

This bridge is at least the second bridge across the Flat at this location, although records are unclear. It is known that a bridge was built here in 1840, and was subsequently destroyed by ice jams and flooding. At least one other predecessor to this bridge is believed to also have been constructed, and destroyed in a similar manner, but records are unclear. In 1871, Jared N. Bresee, builder of the Ada Covered Bridge in nearby Ada, was contracted to build the present structure at a cost of $1500.

The bridge has had repairs and strengthenings over the years, including replacement of the original abutments with concrete in 1905, and two other extensive repair sessions in 1945, and 1994. Because the various repairs and restorations were completed with "conscientious attention to detail", it is believed that the bridge has retained historic integrity and character.

The adjacent grist mill site was the focus of an archaeological dig by Michigan Tech industrial archaeologists in 2003. The bridge is now "a gateway to a place that time forgot," the Grand Rapids Press wrote.

=== Historical marker ===
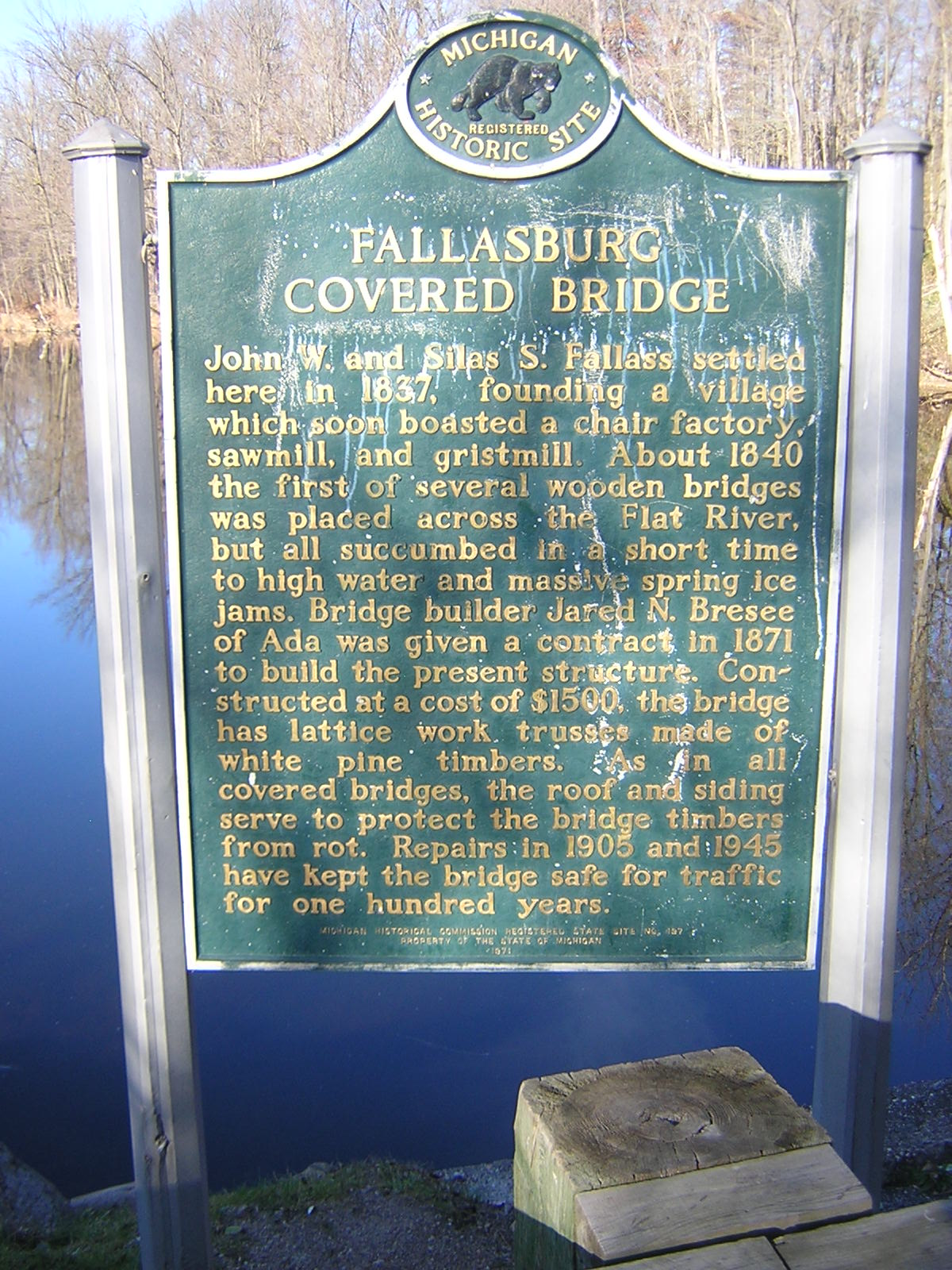
Historical marker

The Fallasburg Covered Bridge was listed with the Michigan State Register on February 12, 1959. It was awarded a Michigan Historical Marker (site S0197) on September 10, 1971. The bridge was then listed with the National Register on March 16, 1972. The bridge lies within the Fallasburg Historic District, designated a historic district (District ID: #98001217) on March 31, 1999.

The historical marker at the site reads as follows:

John W. and Silas S. Fallas settled here in 1837, founded a village which soon boasted a chair factory, sawmill, and gristmill. About 1840 the first of several wooden bridges was placed across the Flat River, but all succumbed in a short time to high water and massive spring ice jams. Bridge builder Jared N. Bresee of Ada was given a contract in 1871 to build the present structure. Constructed at a cost of $1500, the bridge has lattice work trusses made of white pine timbers. As in all covered bridges, the roof and siding serve to protect the bridge timbers from rot. Repairs in 1905 and 1945 have kept the bridge safe for traffic for one hundred years.

== Present day use ==
The bridge remains open to vehicular traffic, although it was damaged in 2013 after a heavy cement truck drove through it. It lies within what is now known as the Fallasburg Pioneer Village or Fallasburg Historical District, established March 31, 1999, and adjacent to the Fallasburg Park. It has a load limit of 3 tons (2.7 tonnes).

The picturesque setting of Fallasburg Park displays Fallasburg Covered Bridge to perfection. Its rural location and quality construction contributed to its survival during a time when old covered bridges were being destroyed to make way for new road construction.

== Gallery ==
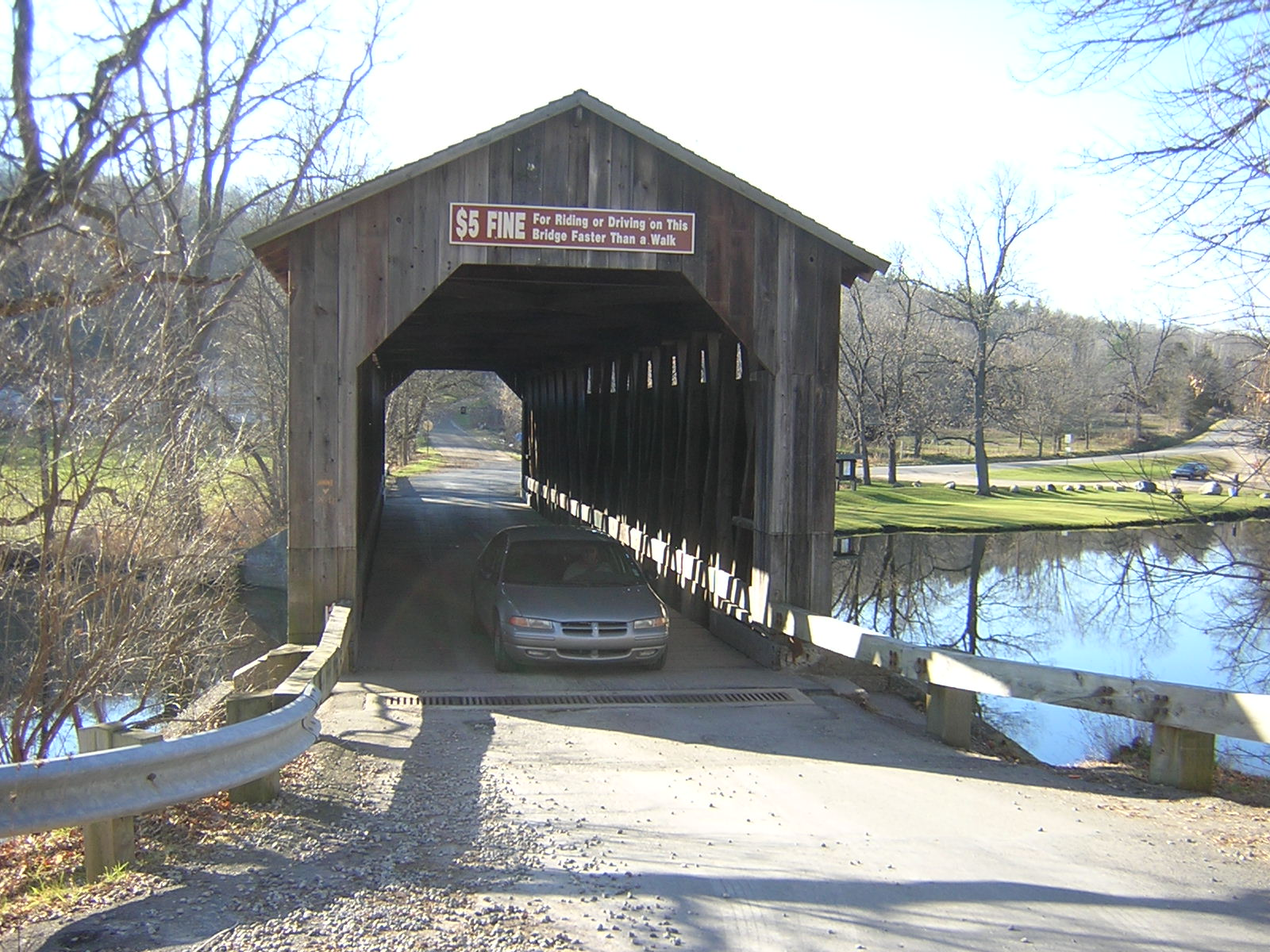
Vehicle crossing to the west. $5 fine sign is visible

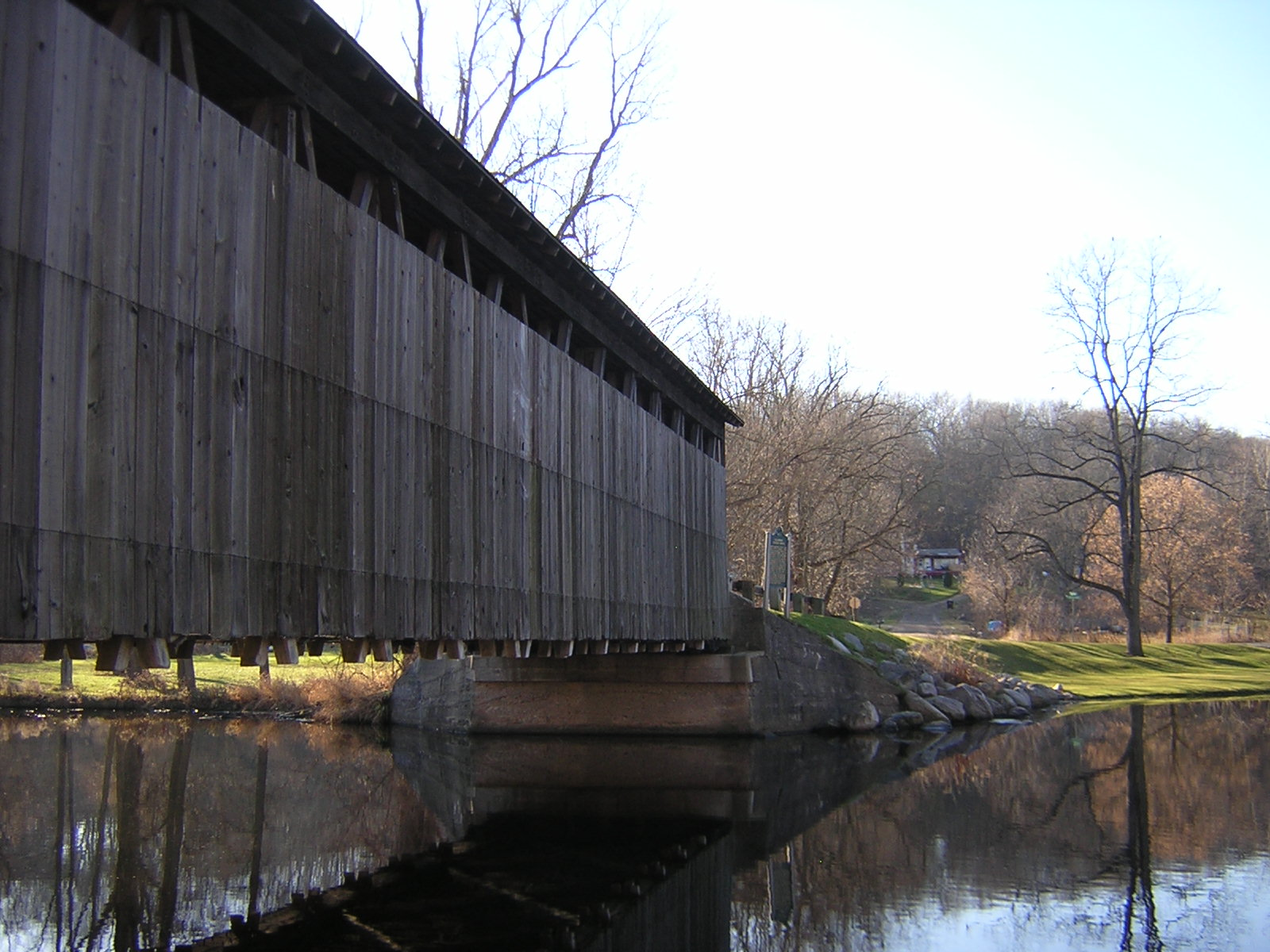
Underside view, showing truss members protruding beneath sheathing, and abutments, replaced 1905.

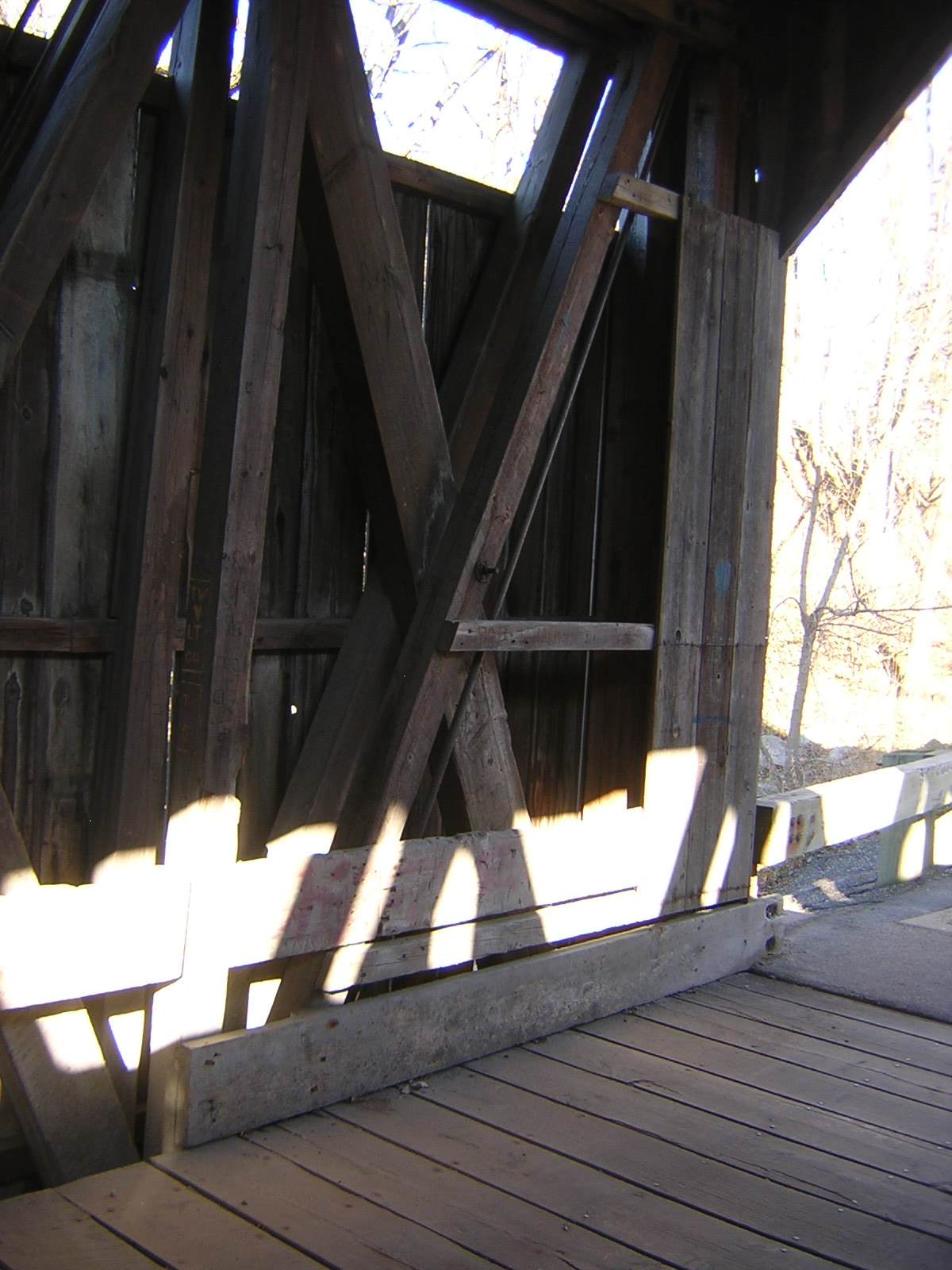
Inside, showing Brown truss stringers and snow protection

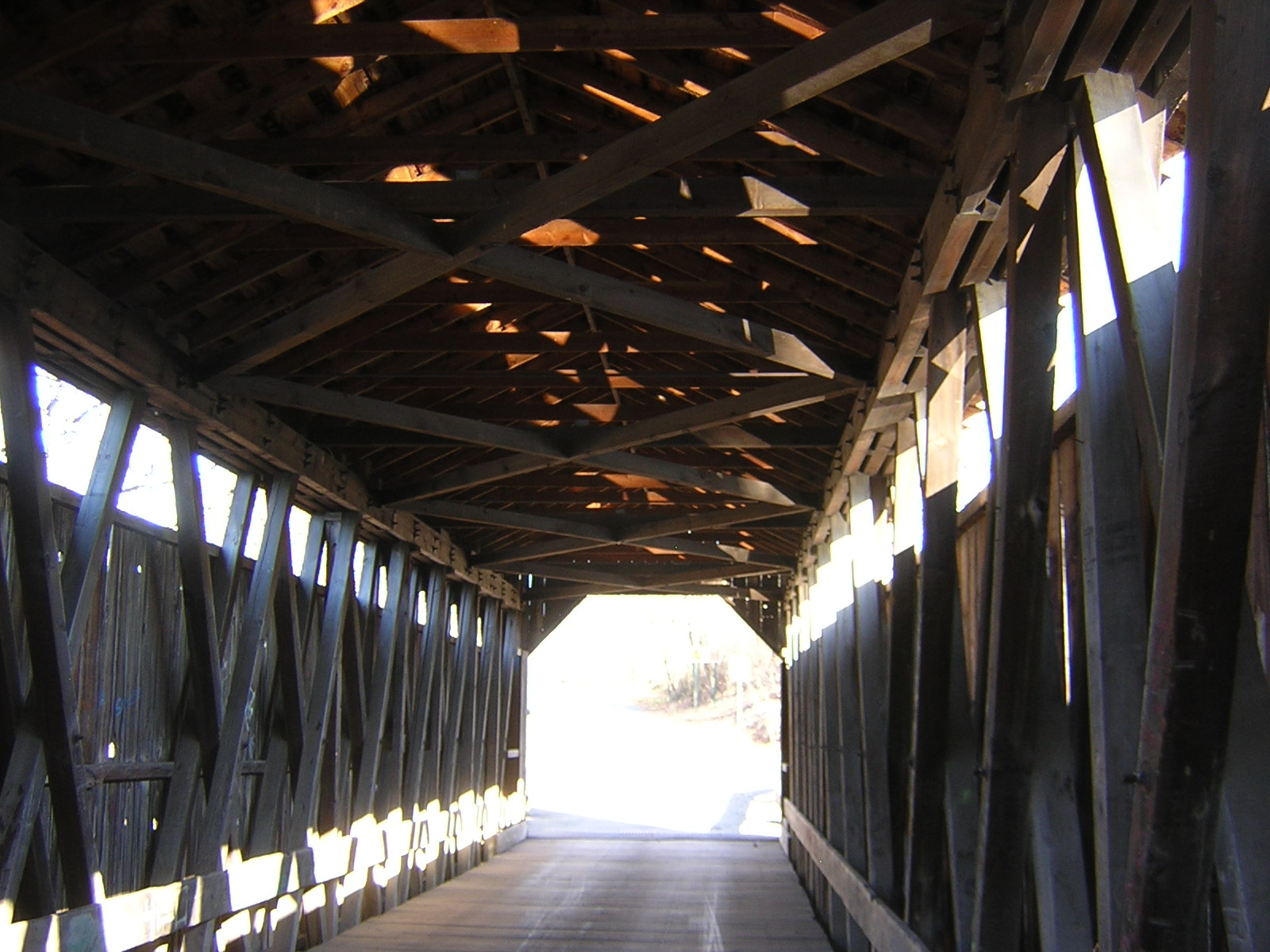
Fallas Bridge interior

== See also ==
- List of Michigan covered bridges
- List of Registered Historic Places in Kent County, Michigan
