= Whites Bridge =

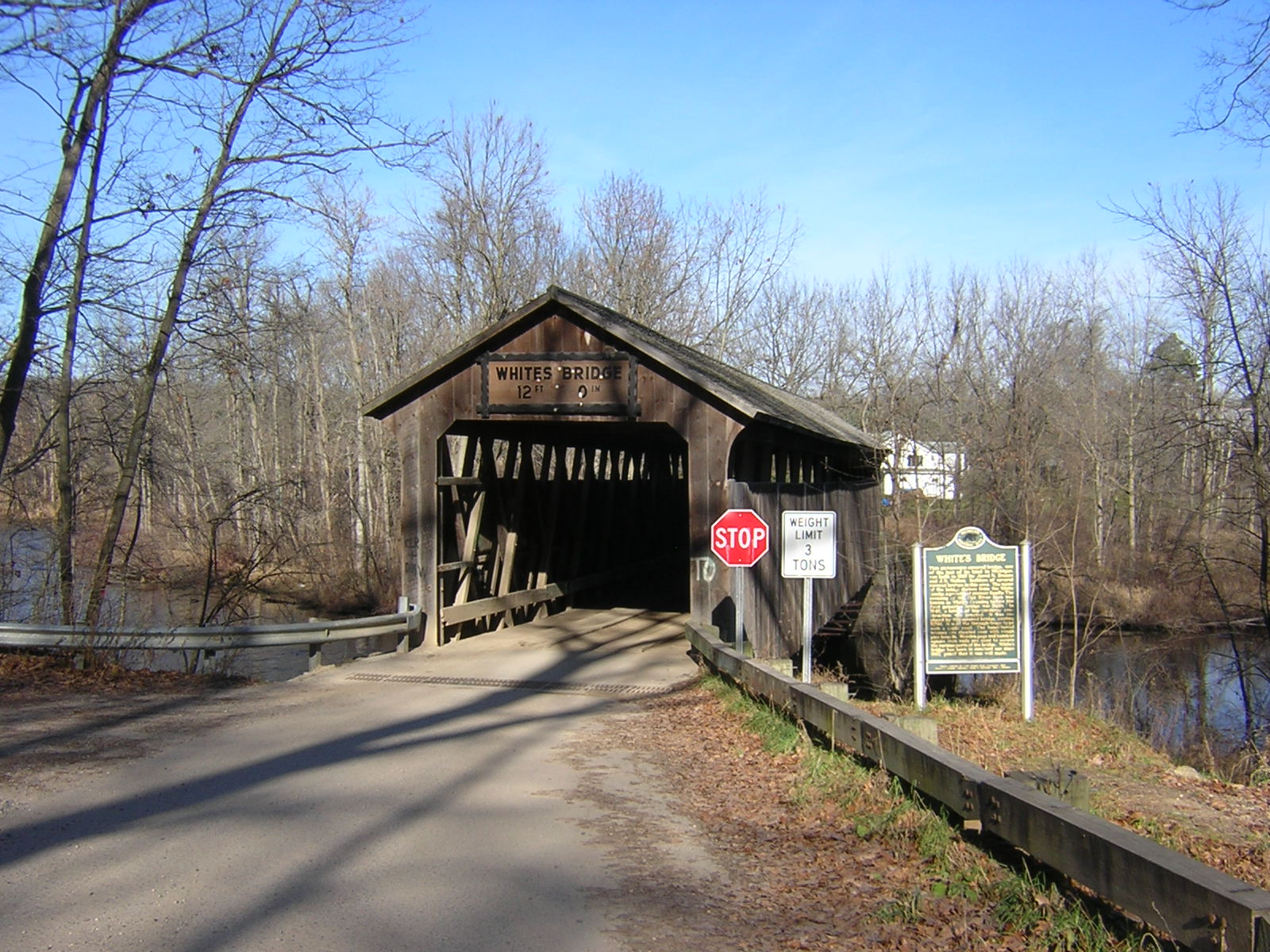
- South Approach
- Coordinates: 43°00′53″N 85°17′52″W
- Carried: Whites Bridge Road
- Crossed: Flat River
- Locale: Smyrna, Michigan
- Maintained by: Ionia County Road Commission

Characteristics
- Design: Brown truss Covered bridge
- Total length: 120 feet (37 m)
- Width: 1 lane, 14 feet (4.3 m)
- Longest span: 116.5 feet (35.5 m)

History
- Opened: 1867 or 1869
- Rebuilt: April 2020
- Destroyed: 2013 (Arson)

Statistics
- Toll: No

Michigan State Historic Site
- Designated: February 17, 1965

Location
- Interactive map of Whites Bridge

Whites Bridge (alternatively White's Bridge) is a 120-foot-long (37 m) Brown truss covered bridge, originally erected in 1869 in Keene Township, Michigan, United States, near Smyrna on the Flat River. Carrying Whites Bridge Road across the Flat River, it is located north of the Fallasburg Bridge and south of Smyrna. The original bridge was among the area's best-known 19th century structures. The bridge was completely destroyed by fire, on the morning of July 7, 2013 (police deemed the case arson). In July 2016, approval was granted for rebuilding a replica bridge, which was completed in April 2020.

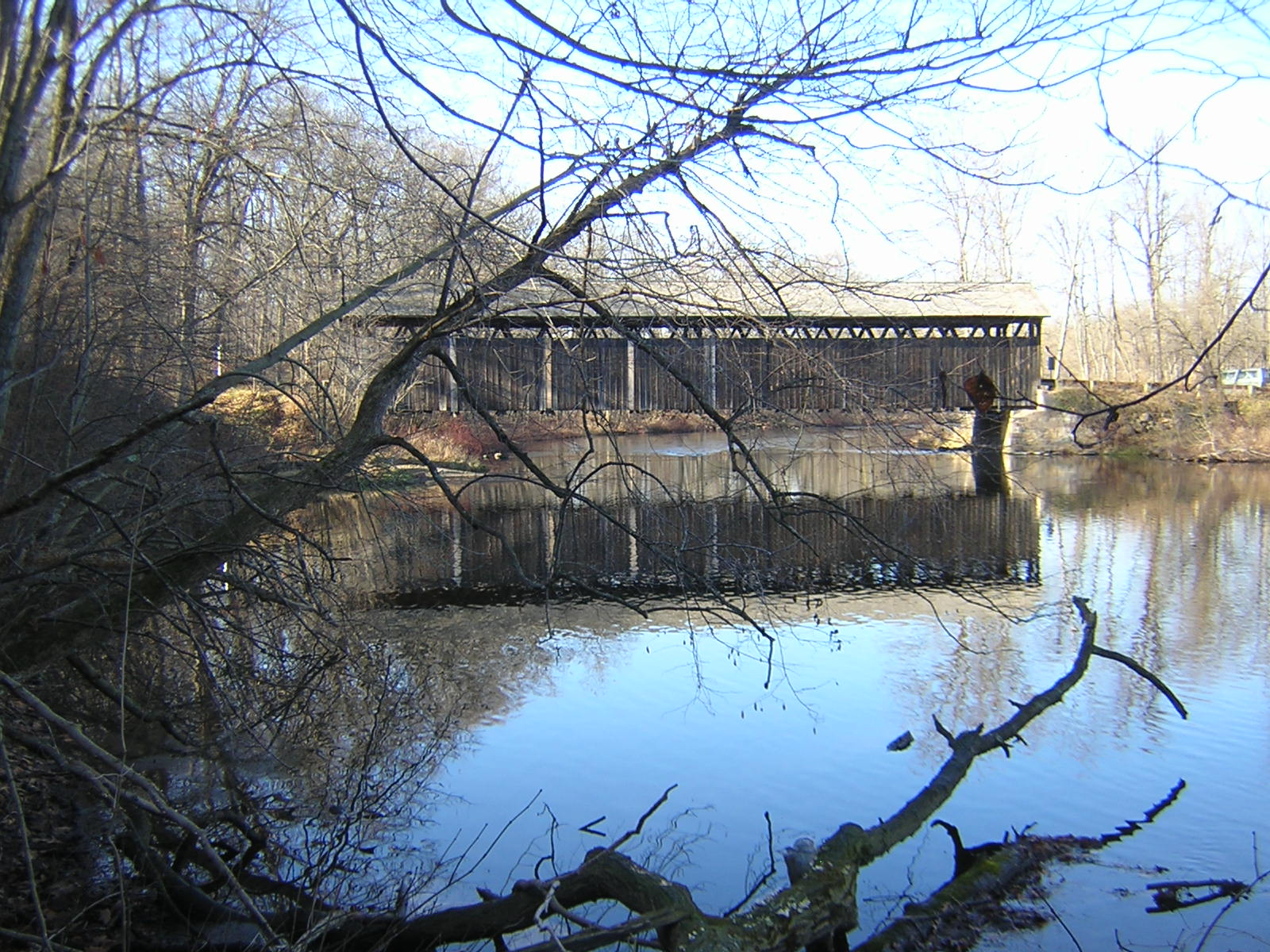
Original bridge (upstream view)

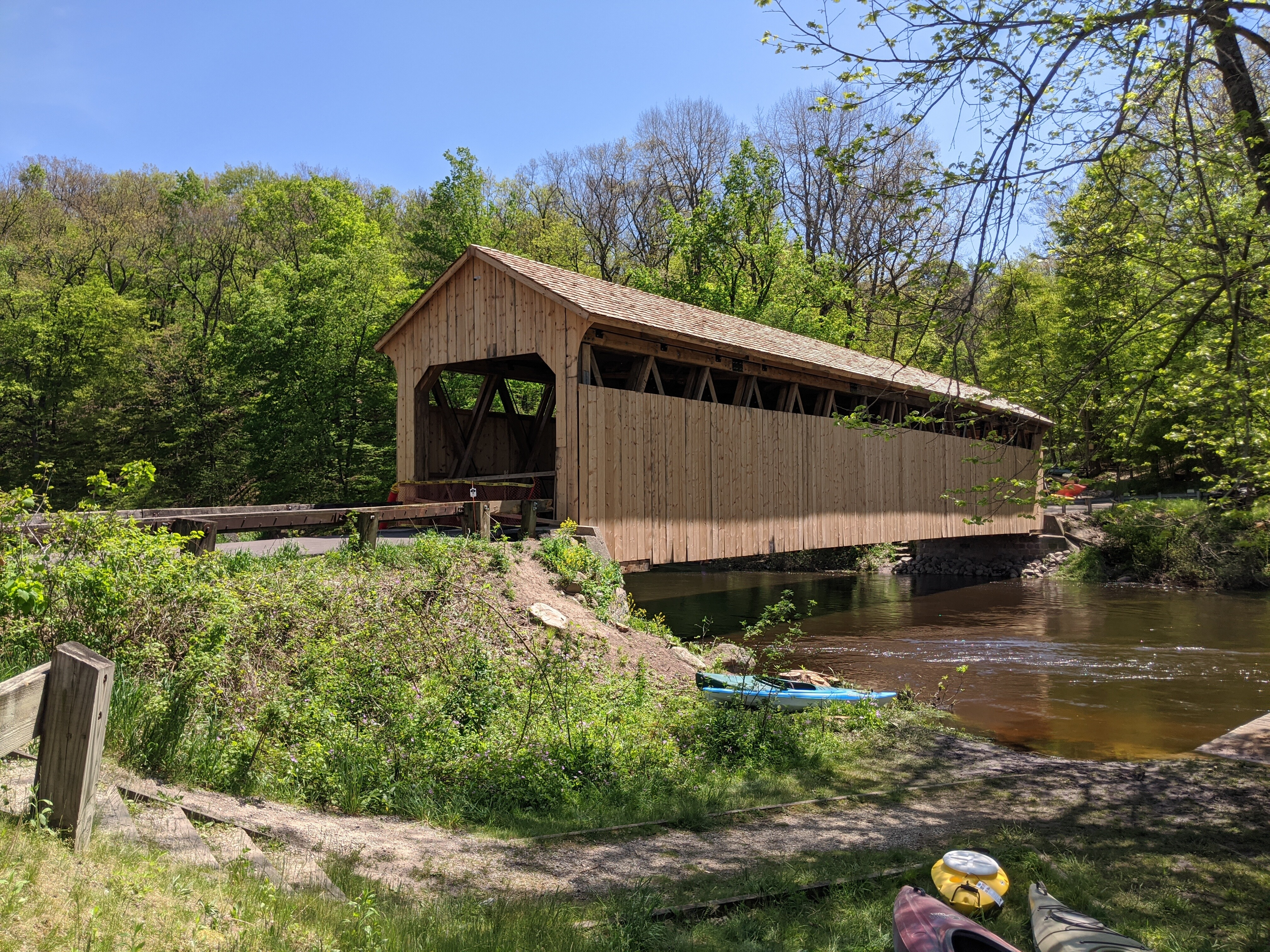
Rebuilt bridge in May, 2020

== History ==
White's Bridge was the third bridge across the Flat River at or near this location south of Smyrna, which was a crossing point or ford, even before the bridges were built. The "Whites Bridge" and "Whites Crossing" names are taken from the White family, prominent pioneers of the day. The original bridge, built in 1840 by Levi T. White and his sons, was a corduroy bridge made of logs. A second bridge, built about 1856, reportedly at a cost of $250, was destroyed by an ice jam during the spring breakup of 1869. The residents of Smyrna sought a replacement with plans to pay for it with a deferred payment.

The residents contracted with Jared N. Bresee, builder of the Fallasburg Bridge, and Joseph H. Walker to build the bridge for a deferred payment of $1000 due in 1870, and $700 due in 1871. The builders used second-hand lumber in an effort to contain costs and finish quickly (the bridge was built in 84 days with only manpower and animal power). The townspeople reportedly discovered auger holes in the floor planking and withheld $25 from the first payment. Except for occasional siding and cedar roof shingle replacement, White's Bridge retained its original form and structure.

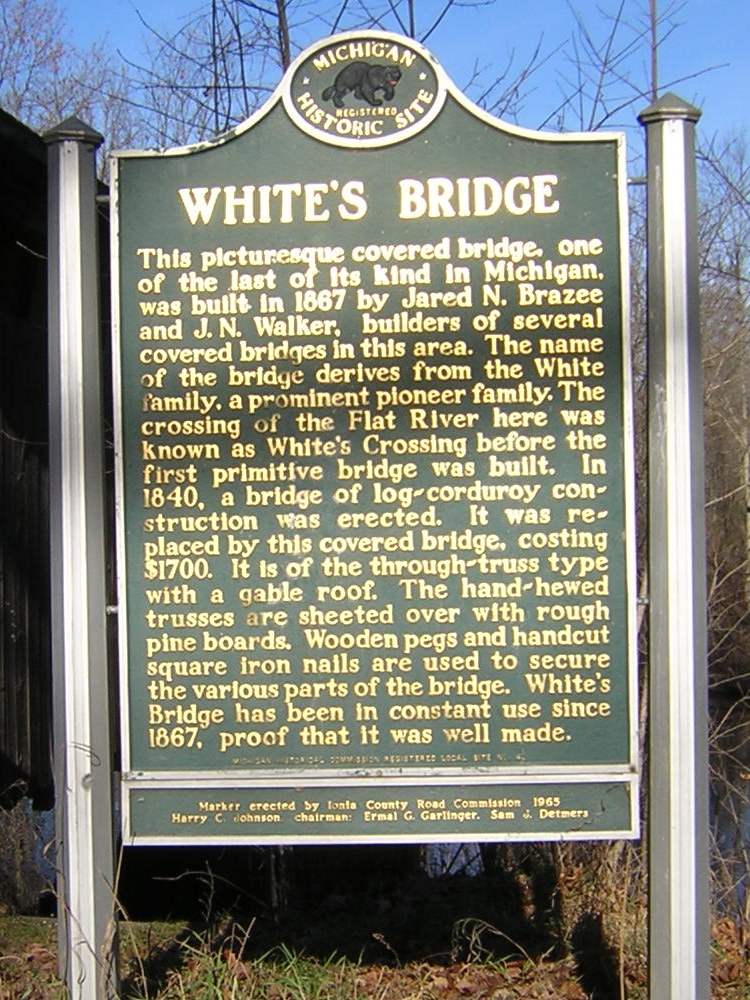
Historical Marker at the site

The bridge was listed with the Michigan State Register on February 17, 1965. It was awarded a Michigan Historical Marker (site L0042) on July 2, 1965.

The bridge was briefly closed in 1995 to allow for repair of the abutments. It was subsequently reopened to automobile traffic. The bridge, with a load limit of 3 short tons (2.7 t) in effect, was in use until it incurred major structural damage, presumed to have been caused by a motor vehicle, on approximately January 8, 2010. It subsequently reopened to traffic with the replacement parts easily visible.

Until 2013, White's Bridge was arguably the oldest covered bridge still using parts of the original structure in Michigan.

=== Destruction ===
On July 7, 2013, the bridge burned down. The police suspected arson, and the official cause was placed under investigation. As of July 23, 2013, it was reported in The Greenville Daily News, that the fire of July 7, was indeed an arson. Crime lab tests confirmed the presence of an accelerant. Investigation is ongoing. A group started to raise funds for rebuilding the historic bridge.

=== Replacement ===
On April 16, 2015, the Whites Bridge Historical Society announced that the funds had been secured to rebuild a replica bridge that would be open to traffic in 2016. This funding will include a $275,000 grant from the Michigan Department Of Transportation and $200,000 from private grants and donations. By July 2016, over $475,000 (in grants and donations) had been raised and approval had been granted for the building of a replica bridge.

In February 2021, the Society announced that the signage had been installed and the bridge is officially complete. Traffic is now allowed on the bridge.

=== Historical marker text ===
This picturesque covered bridge, one of the last of its kind in Michigan, was built in 1867 by Jared N. Brazee and J. N. Walker, builders of several covered bridges in this area. The name of the bridge derives from the White family, a prominent pioneer family. The crossing of the Flat River here was known as White's Crossing before the first primitive bridge was built. In 1840, a bridge of log corduroy construction was erected. It was replaced by this covered bridge, costing $1700. It is of the through-truss type with a gable roof. The hand-hewn trusses are sheeted over with rough pine boards. Wooden pegs and handcut square iron nails are used to secure the various parts of the bridge. White's Bridge has been in constant use since 1867, proof that it was well made.

== Design ==
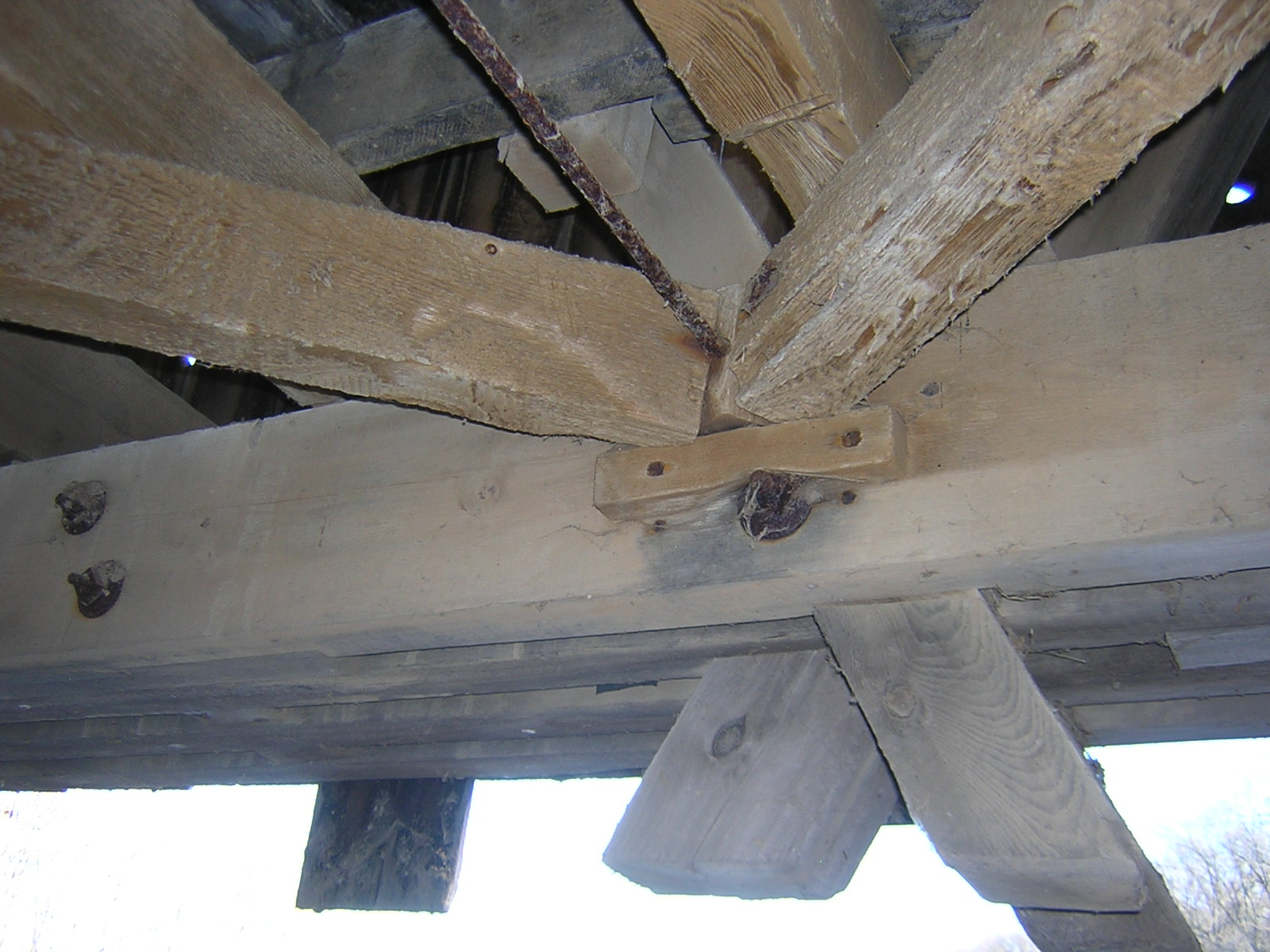
Underside view, showing truss connections. Original construction used little metal

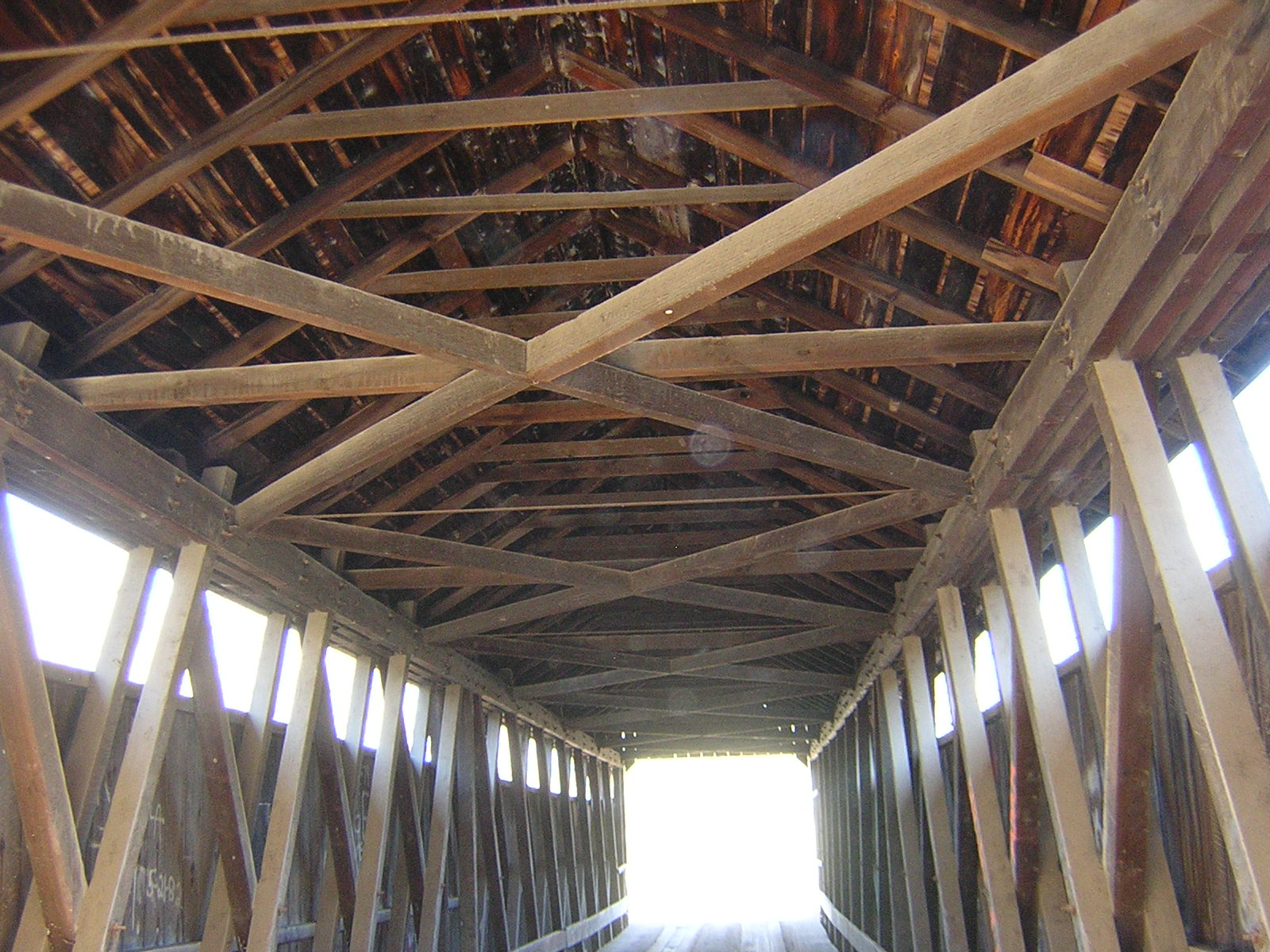
Inside, showing brown truss stringers

The bridge uses the Brown truss system, a through truss consisting of diagonal compression beams and almost vertical tension members (slanting in at the top toward the center of the span). This system was patented by Josiah Brown of Buffalo, New York, in 1857. The Brown truss is similar to the Howe arrangement of "X" bracing and counter bracing, but uses lighter members and less timber. It contains no upright compression members and no iron except for bolt connectors at the timber intersections. Builders used the Brown truss successfully in at least four covered bridges in Michigan, two of which (Ada Covered Bridge, Fallasburg Bridge) are still in existence. The Brown truss was thus briefly popular in Michigan but did not gain wide acceptance elsewhere.

The bridge rests on concrete and fieldstone footings at each end. As typical for covered bridges, it is a frame structure with a gabled roof that is covered with creosote shingles. Its construction is of the through-truss type, and the trusses are completely sheathed on the outside with rough pine boards. The floor is 14 feet (4.3 m) wide and 117 feet (36 m) long. All of the truss members and planks, sheathing, and other dimensional lumber were originally hand hewn and secured with wooden pegs, although the bridge had subsequently been strengthened. The sheeting and roof boards were fastened to the rafters with hand-cut nails. The abutments were made of local fieldstone.

== See also ==
- List of bridges documented by the Historic American Engineering Record in Michigan
- List of covered bridges in Michigan
