= Ada bridge =

Ada bridge may refer to:

- Ada Bridge in Belgrade, Serbia
- Ada Covered Bridge in Michigan, US
