= Brown truss =

19th-century bridge truss design

Brown Truss bridge
- Interior structure of a covered bridge utilizing a Brown Truss structure. Diagram, white members are tension elements and may not be present
- Ancestor: Truss bridge, Kings Post Bridge
- Related: None
- Descendant: None
- Carries: Pedestrians, livestock, vehicles
- Span range: Medium
- Material: wood planks
- Movable: No
- Design effort: medium

A Brown truss is a type of bridge truss, used in covered bridges. It is noted for its economical use of materials and is named after the inventor, Josiah Brown Jr., of Buffalo, New York, who patented it July 7, 1857, as US patent 17,722.

== Description ==
The Brown truss is a box truss that is a through truss (as contrasted with a deck truss) and consists of diagonal cross compression members connected to horizontal top and bottom stringers. There may be vertical or almost vertical tension members (the diagram shows these members, while the patent application diagram does not) but there are no vertical members in compression. In practice, when used in a covered bridge, the most common application, the truss is protected with outside sheathing.

The floor and roof are also trusses, but are horizontal and serve to give the truss rigidity. The bottoms of the diagonals tend to protrude below the sheathing. The Brown truss is noted for economy of materials as it can be built with very little metal.

== Patent ==
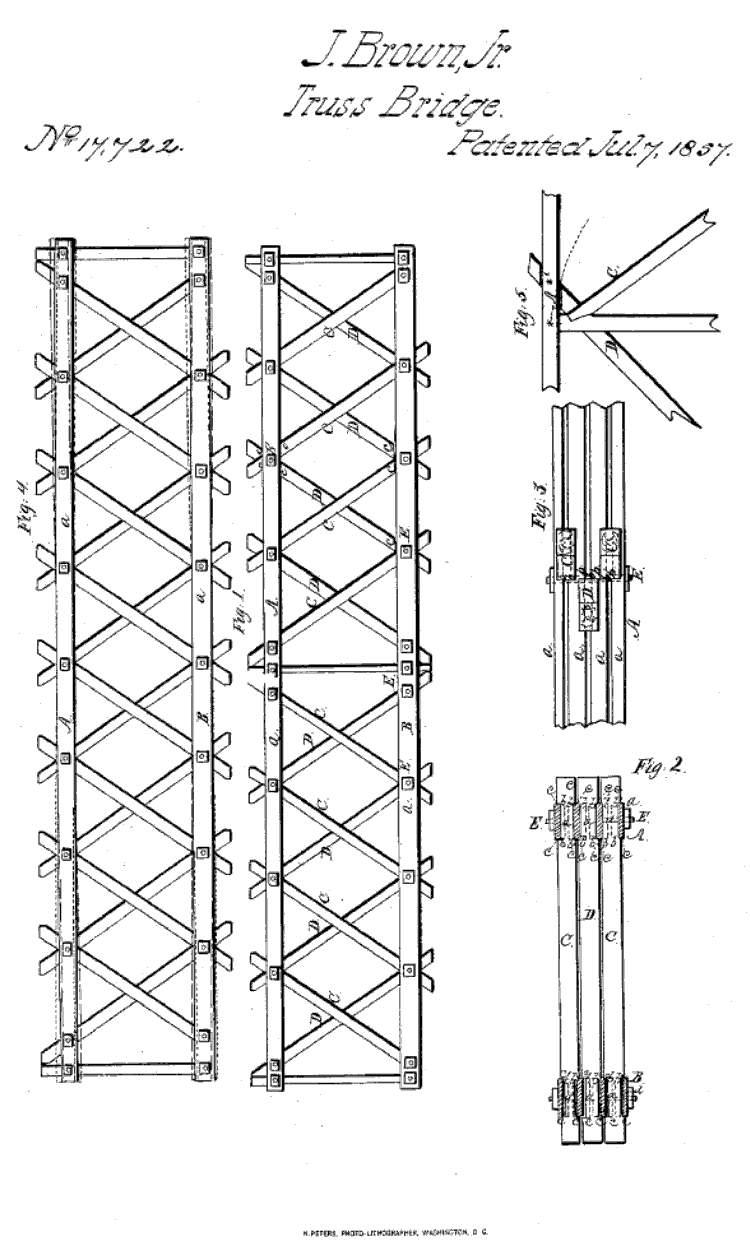
Patent drawing for US Patent 17,722

Brown's patent claims did not actually address the economy afforded by lack of vertical members ("braces"). Instead he focused on the improved strength over previous trusses that had members ("braces" in his terminology) come to the horizontal chord near to each other but not exactly together (at "gains" in his terminology), by having several members come together in the same place. From the patent text:

I do not claim broadly furnishing the main or counter braces with gains and passing them between the timbers of the chords;

What I do claim as my invention, and desire to secure by letters Patent, is— Providing each of the main and counter braces with two gains at top and bottom, and each of the timbers of the chord with a gain at the point where the braces are applied corresponding with the gains in the braces, and the braces thus formed up between the timber, with the gains of the braces in such relation to the gains of the timbers that when the timbers of the chords are brought together they are combined and become, as it were, only one piece, no part of which can be operated upon or affected independently of the other by the downward and upward thrusts common to truss bridges, even if the bolt which passes laterally through and intersects each set of braces and the timbers of the chord were removed.

== History ==
The Brown truss enjoyed a brief period of favor in the 1860s, and is known to have been used in four covered bridges in Michigan, the Ada Covered Bridge, the Fallasburg Bridge, Whites Bridge and one other. The design did not appear to gain wide acceptance as modern bridges tend to be Howe, Pratt, bowstring or Warren trusses.

Detail images from existing bridges

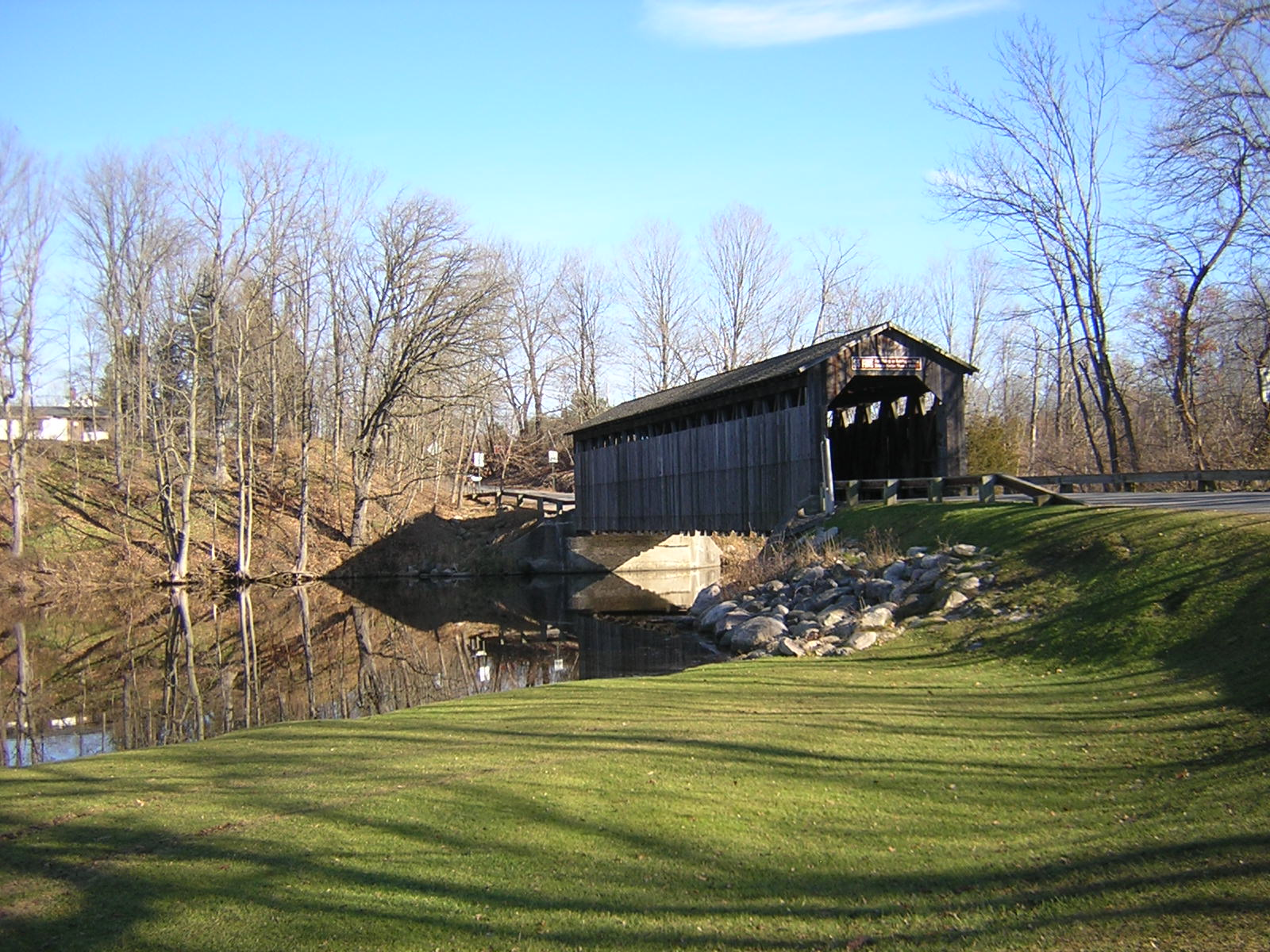
Fallasburg Bridge, a Brown truss covered bridge

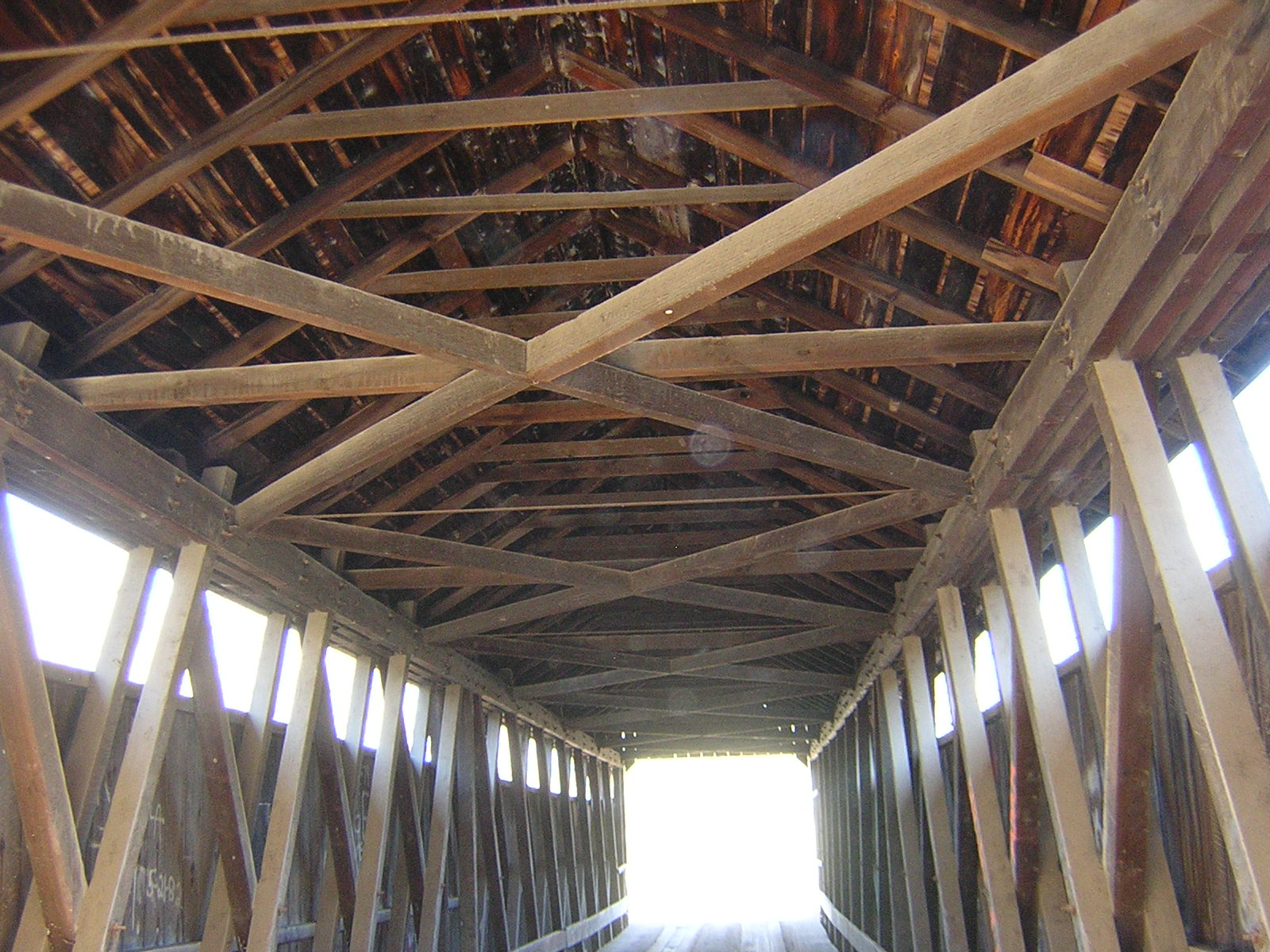
Whites Bridge interior showing diagonal members on sides and horizontal diagonal roof support, forming the top of the box truss

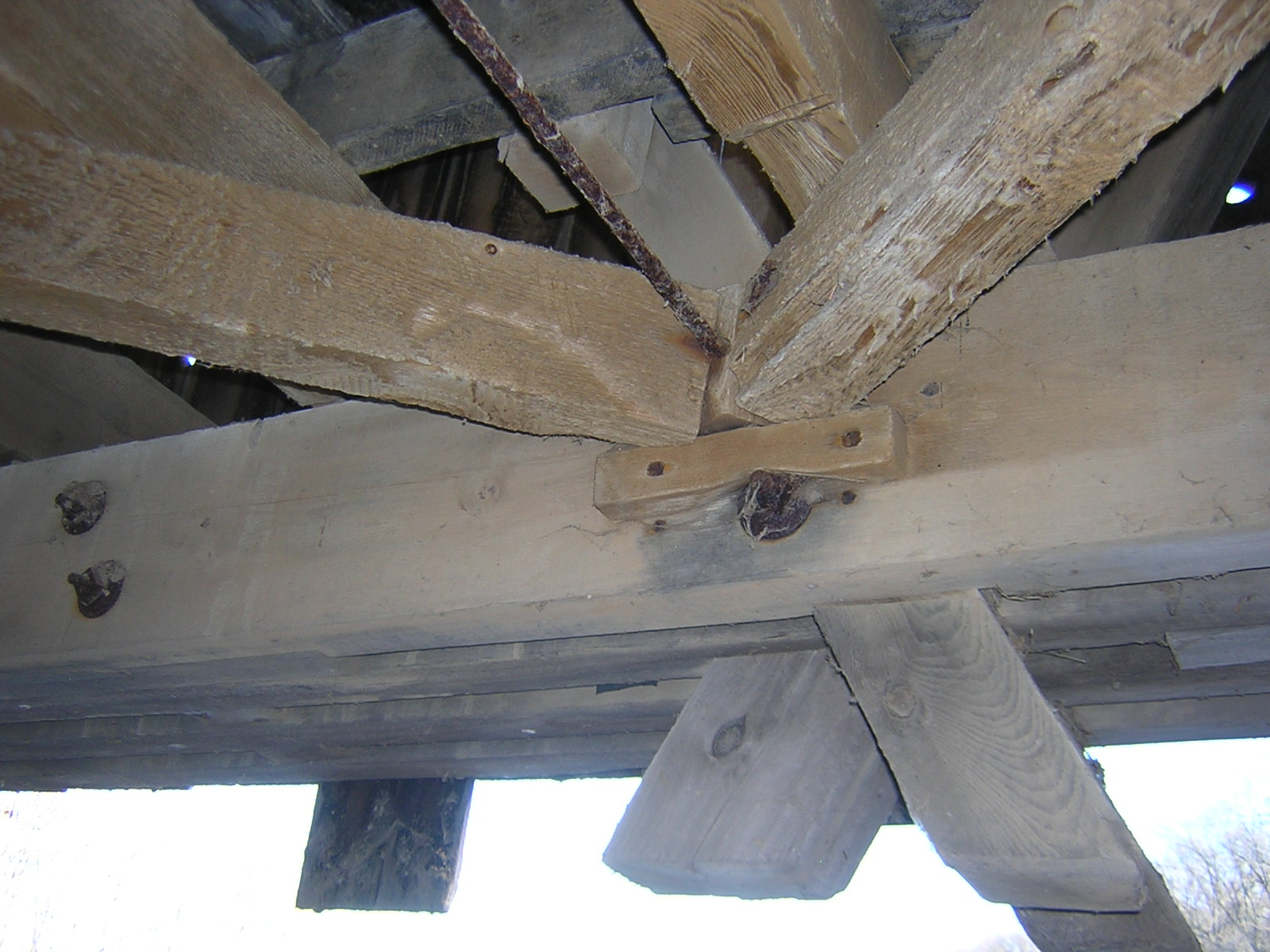
Whites Bridge underside, showing floor supports pinned to side (diagonal) truss members. Bottom of diagonal truss members protrude below the sheathing.

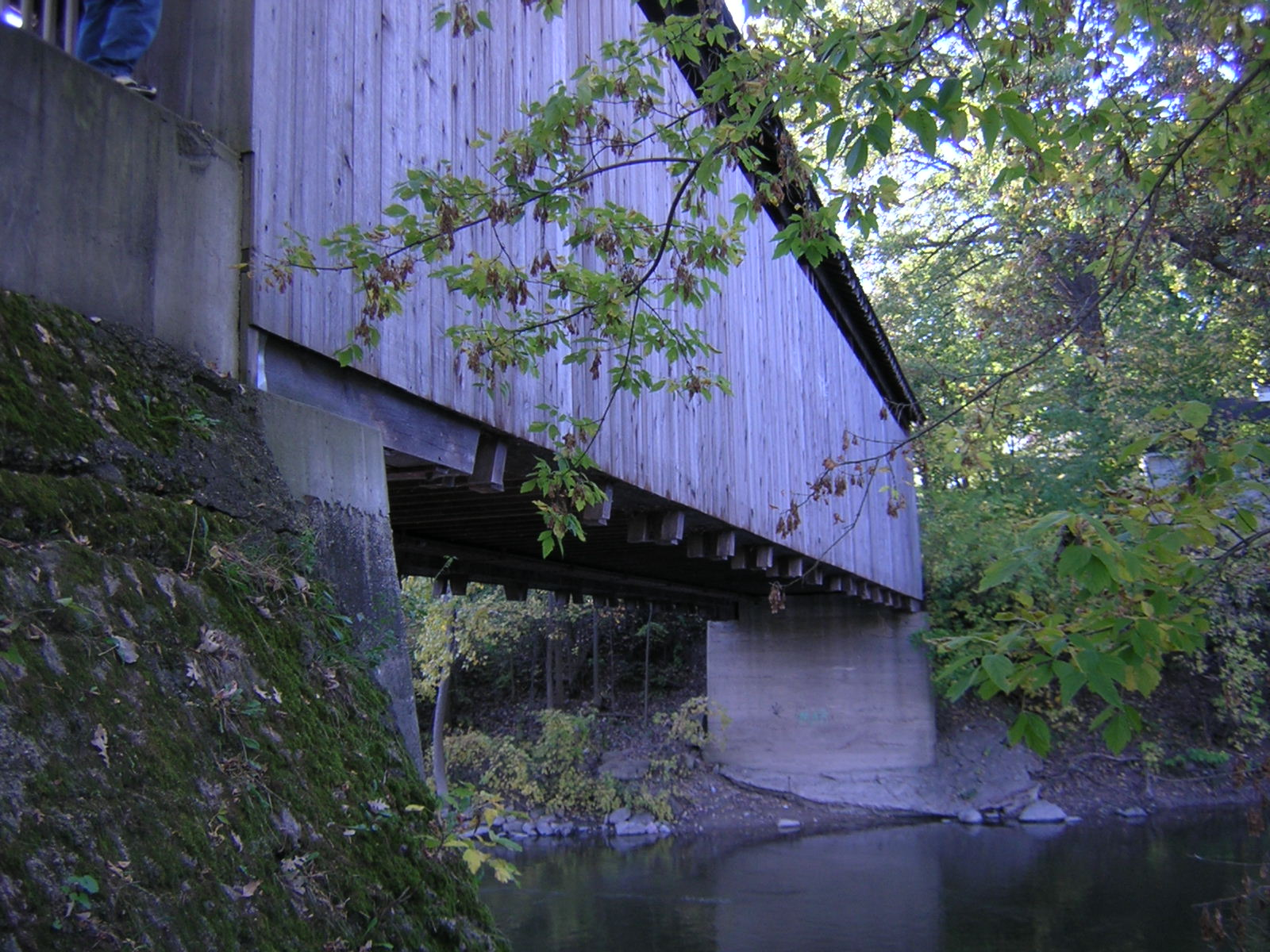
Ada Covered Bridge looking upward. Truss member ends can be seen protruding below sheathing. Very top of truss is visible above sheathing gap below roofline. This gap admitted light, making the bridge interior usable, if somewhat dark.

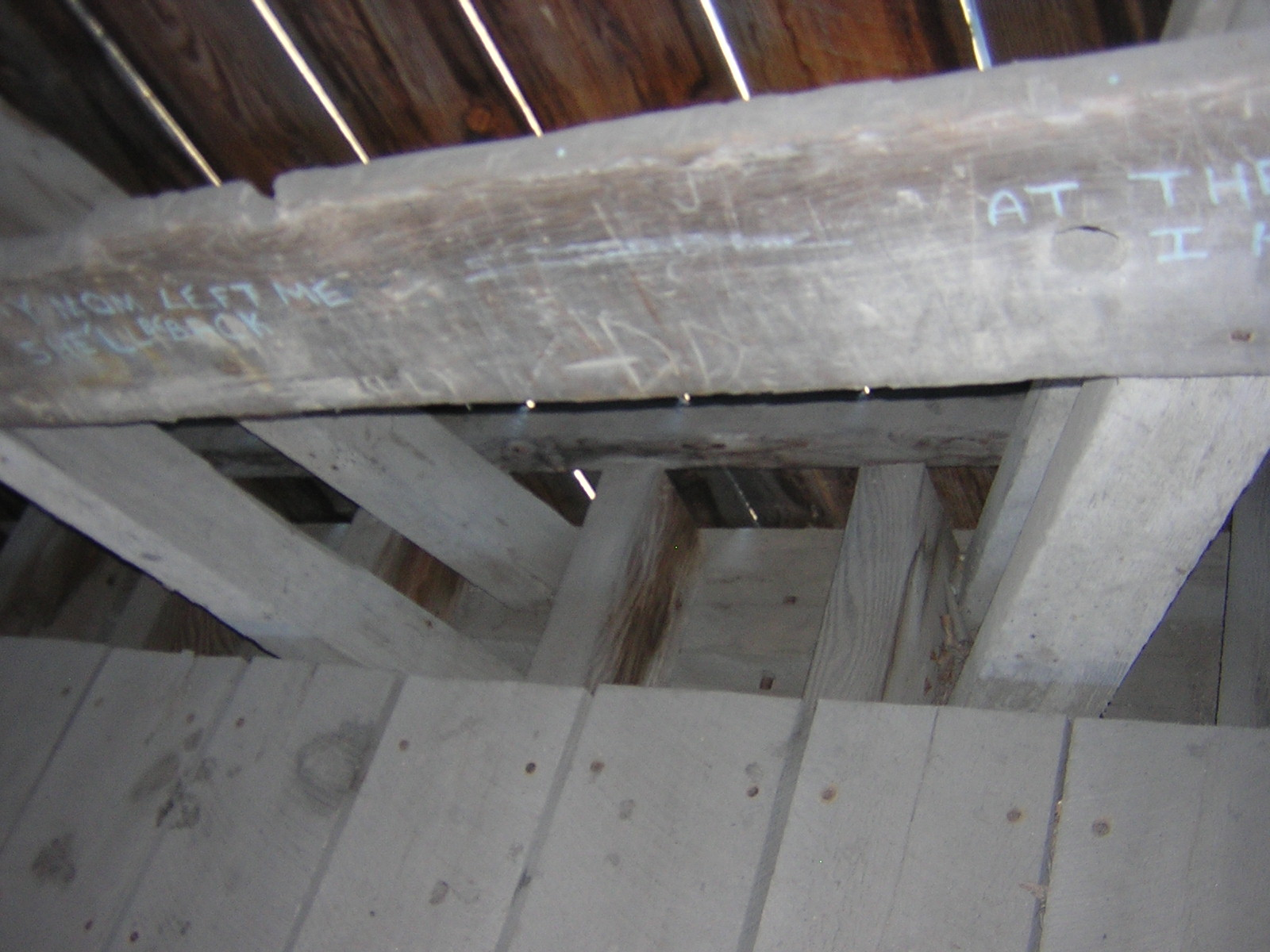
Bottom of diagonal truss members interlock with floor (Fallasburg Bridge)

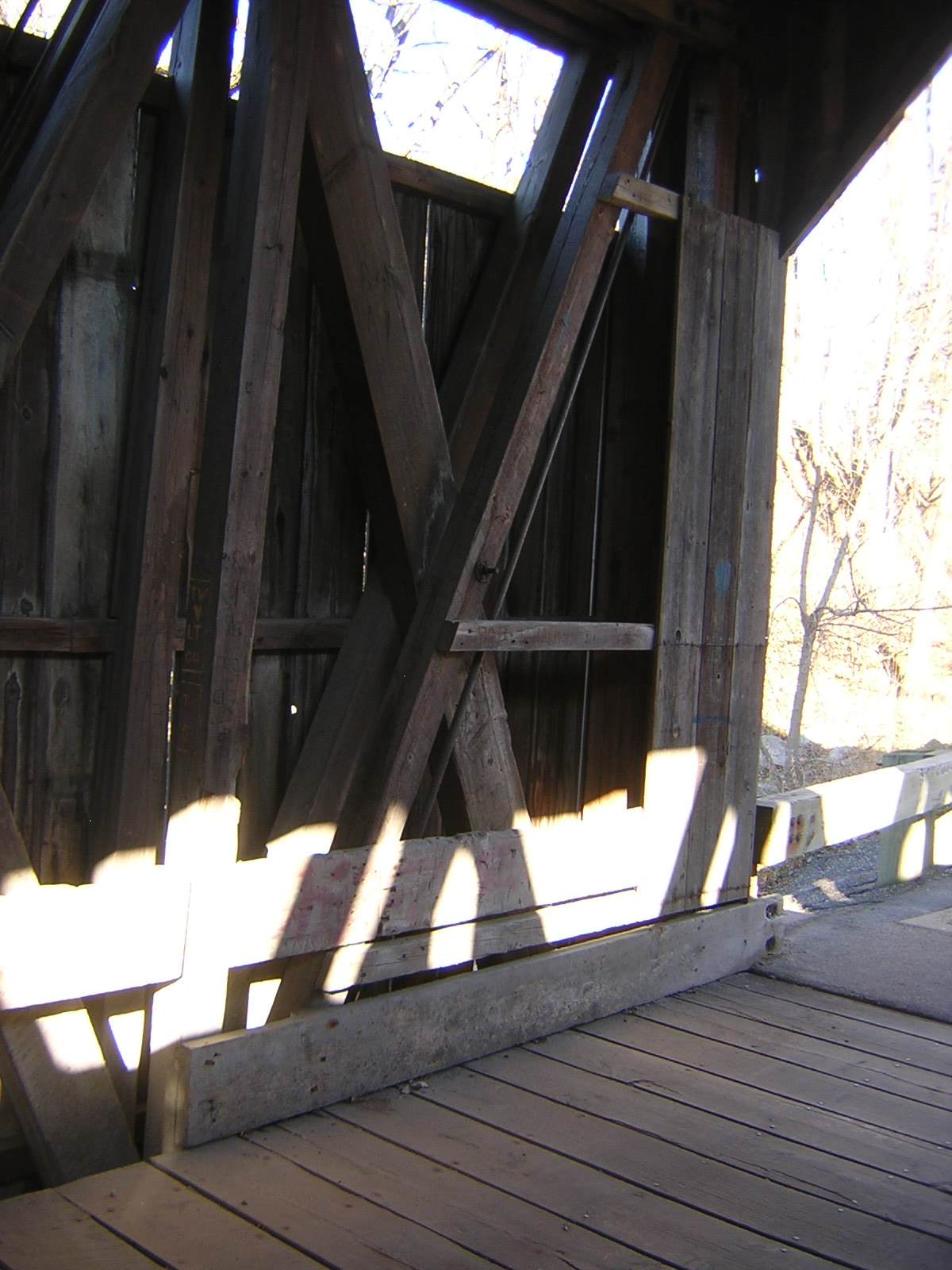
The truss ends are special, additional material may be present for rigidity or to protect the structure from snow. (Fallasburg Bridge)

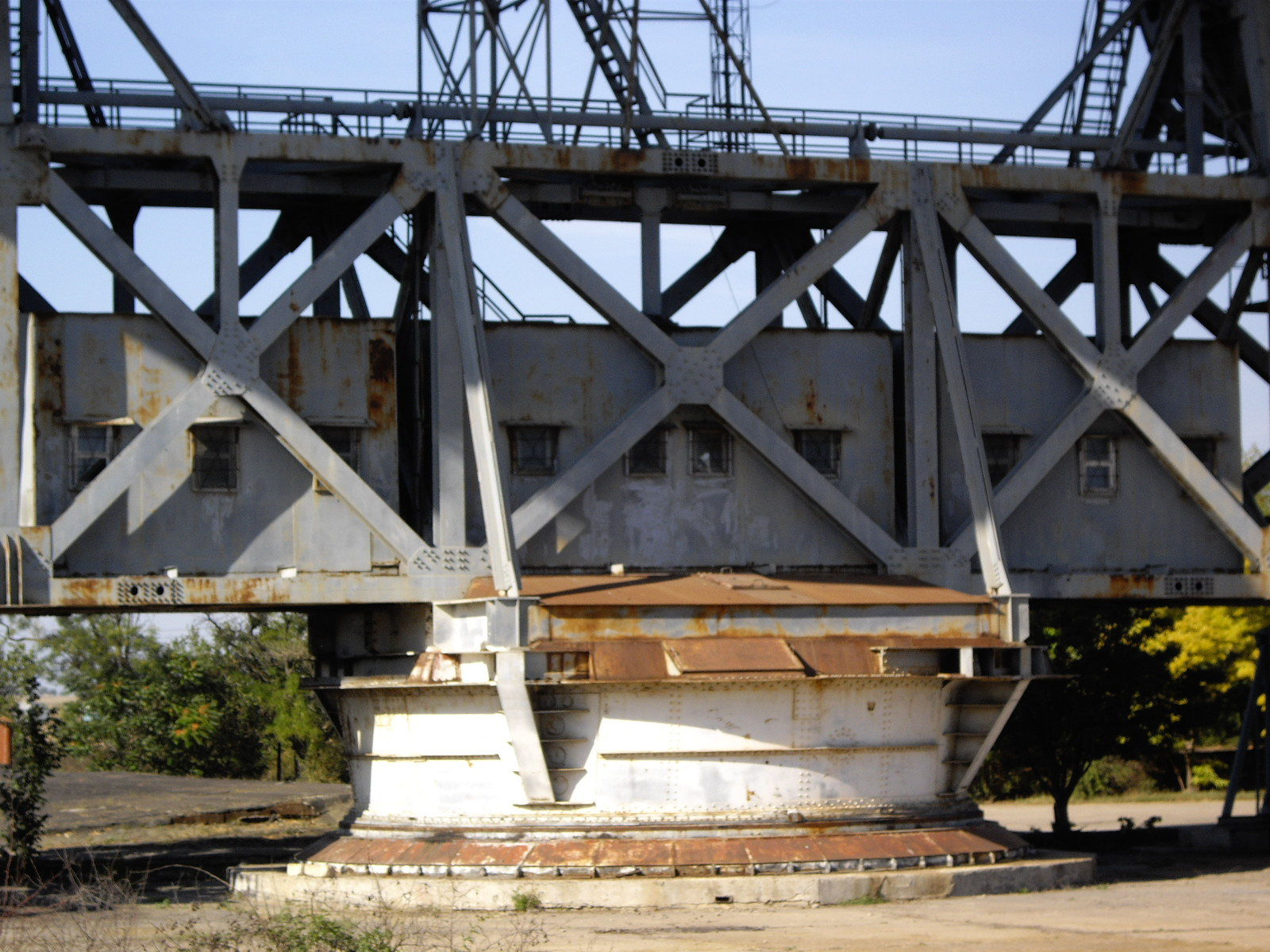
The steerable frames of Deep Space Communication Complex constructed from battleship gun turrets and railway bridge trusses.

== See also ==
- Truss bridge for bridges employing various truss types
