= Nichols Covered Bridge =

Covered footbridge bridge in Michigan

Donald F. Nichols Covered Bridge
- Coordinates: 42°25′04″N 86°15′01″W
- Carries: Covered Bridge Road
- Crosses: Black River
- Locale: South Haven, Michigan
- Official name: Donald F. Nichols Covered Bridge
- Maintained by: Van Buren Parks Department

Characteristics
- Total length: 180 ft (55 m)

Statistics
- Daily traffic: Foot and bike

Donald F. Nichols Covered Bridge was a Covered Bridge on the Kal-Haven Trail. The bridge was a 108-foot long covered footbridge and was demolished in July 2023. The bridge was located near the South Haven (West) trail-head. The Kal-Haven Trail has seven bridges along the trail that were historic railroad bridges. These bridges were constructed when the original railroad was built in 1870. A trestle was turned into a covered bridge as part of the conversion of old railroad bed to public trail.

== Original bridge ==
The original bridge was built by the Kalamazoo and South Haven Railroad. Lack of money caused the railroad’s future to be placed in the possibility of the new company folding and not completing the rail line. Michigan Central Railroad leased the route and bought bonds in the Kalamazoo and South Haven Railroad savings the line.

Liberty Hyde Bailey Jr. once skipped school to see the bridge over the Black River. He dubbed it "the most wonderful engineering feat in all the world."

== Conversion ==
The bridge was built in its current form by the Michigan Civilian Conservation Corps over the Black River. The Michigan Civilian Conservation Corp that performed the work was a nine-member group that had covered the former railroad trestles for use for bicycles. The Michigan Civilian Conservation Corp of 1988 was made up of 500 previously unemployed people from 18 to 25 who worked for one year earning minimum wage instead of getting welfare.

The bridge is named after a local resident, his family (Robert Nichols) donated the material to convert the bridge from a trestle railroad bridge to a covered bridge after his death.

=== Donald F. Nichols ===
Donald and his wife were the owners of the Nichols Hotel in South Haven, Michigan. Donald died at the age of 72 in 1981, his wife Elizabeth in 2001. The hotel, established in 1926 by Ward Webster, was an amalgamation of three buildings built in the 1880s. The Webster Hotel was sold to Don Nichols in 1944 and renamed the Hotel Nichols. It was kept in the Nichols family until sold in 2002.
