= Ada Covered Bridge =

Historic bridge in Ada, Michigan, U.S.

- U.S. National Register of Historic Places
- Michigan State Historic Site
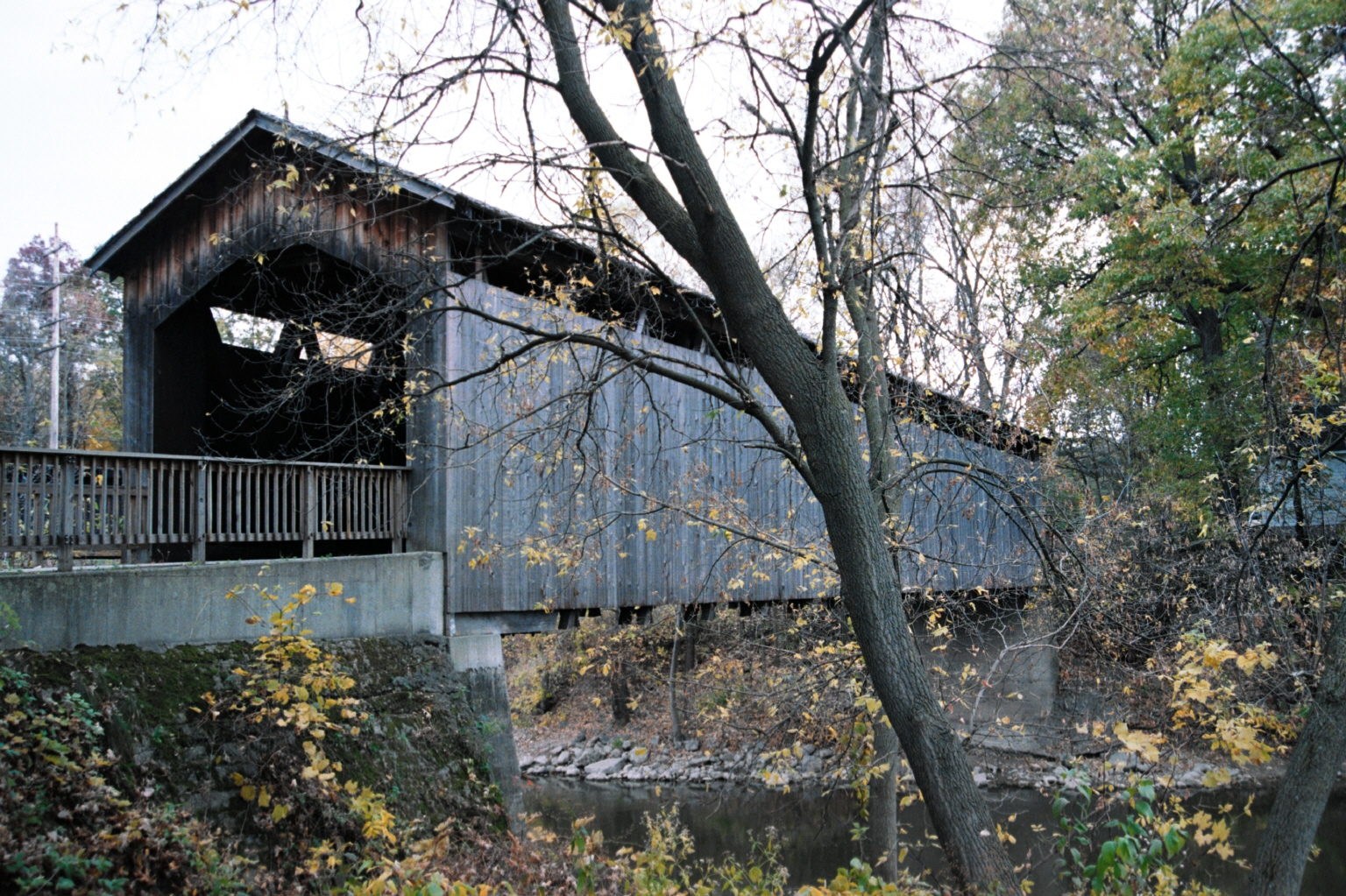
- Upstream view from observation deck in park

- Location within Michigan Location within the United States
- Interactive map
- Location: 7490 Thornapple River Dr SE Ada, MI 49301
- Coordinates: 42°57′09″N 85°29′11″W
- Area: 2 acres (0.81 ha)
- Built: 1867
- Architect: Josiah Brown Jr.
- Architectural style: Brown truss Covered bridge
- NRHP reference No.: 70000275

Significant dates
- Added to NRHP: February 16, 1970
- Designated MSHS: December 8, 1977

Bridge Statistics
- Coordinates: 42°57′09″N 85°29′11″W
- Carries: Fase/Bronson St. (footpath)
- Crosses: Thornapple River
- Locale: Ada, Michigan
- Maintained by: Kent County Road Commission
- Website: adamichigan.org/township/departments/parks-recreation/parks/leonard-park

Characteristics
- Design: Brown truss Covered bridge
- Material: Douglas Fir
- Total length: 125 ft (38 m)
- Width: one lane
- Longest span: 125 ft

History
- Opened: 1867
- Rebuilt: December 1980
- Closed: still open, foot traffic only

Location
- Interactive map of Bridge Statistics

The Ada Covered Bridge is a 125-foot (38 m) span Brown truss covered bridge erected in 1867 in Ada, Michigan, United States. Carrying Bronson Street across the Thornapple River, it is located just south of where the Thornapple enters the Grand River, in turn just south of M-21. It is listed on the National Register of Historic Places.

== Design ==
The bridge uses the Brown truss system, consisting of diagonal compression beams and almost vertical tension members (slanting in at the top toward the center of the span), patented by Josiah Brown Jr. of Buffalo, New York, in 1857. A timber bearing Brown's name was discovered during repair work carried out in 1913.

The bridge is 125 feet (38 m) long, and originally rested on wooden pilings. As is typical for covered bridges, its gabled roof is covered with creosote shingles.

== History ==
The Michigan State Legislature authorised Ada Township to borrow up to $3,000 for building or maintaining bridges in the area. Construction of this bridge, also known as the "Bradfield Bridge", was carried out in 1867 by William Holmes.

Prior to construction of the upstream dam, the Thornapple River was prone to flooding. According to a historical marker posted at the bridge, "it is said that farmers used to drive wagons loaded with stones onto the bridge during high water to hold it to the foundation."

Repair work was carried out in 1913 to modify the trusses, and replace the timber abutments with reinforced concrete. The bridge was part of an important artery into the village of Ada until 1930, when the main highway was rerouted and a concrete bridge built further down the Thornapple River. At that time the bridge was closed to automobile traffic, reverting to pedestrian use only.

In 1941 the Kent County Road Commission and the Works Progress Administration made extensive restorations, re-roofing the bridge with new protective creosote shingles and replacing many of its decayed underlying supports with new beams. The Road Commission purchased a nearby barn to supply wood for replacement of badly deteriorated elements.

The bridge was listed with the Michigan State Register on May 9, 1969, and with the National Register on February 16, 1970. It was awarded a Michigan Historical Marker (site L0075) on August 28, 1974. It is one of four existing publicly owned covered bridges in Michigan.

In 1979 the roof collapsed due to heavy snow, and the bridge was restored using funds raised by private donations. Shortly after the repairs were finished, the bridge was completely destroyed by fire. The citizens again rallied, this time with the help of the Amway corporation, headquartered in Ada, and rebuilt it once again. The replica bridge, now resting on concrete abutments, is 14 feet (4.3 m) wide and 125 feet (38 m) long.

The bridge is now open only to pedestrian traffic and connects the Village of Ada on one side of the Thornapple River with a park on the other side. It is maintained by the Kent County Park system.

== Images ==
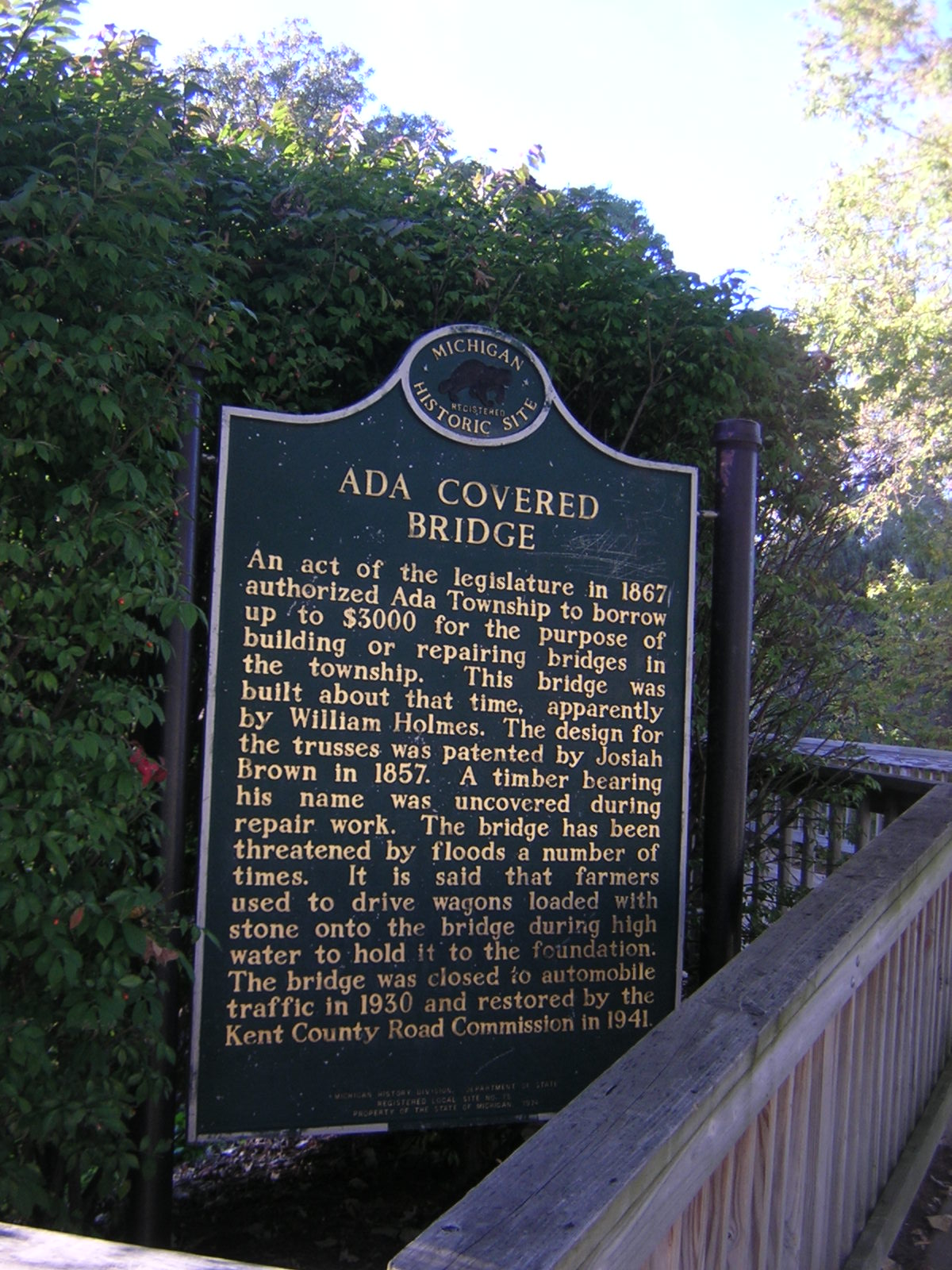
Historical Marker at the site.

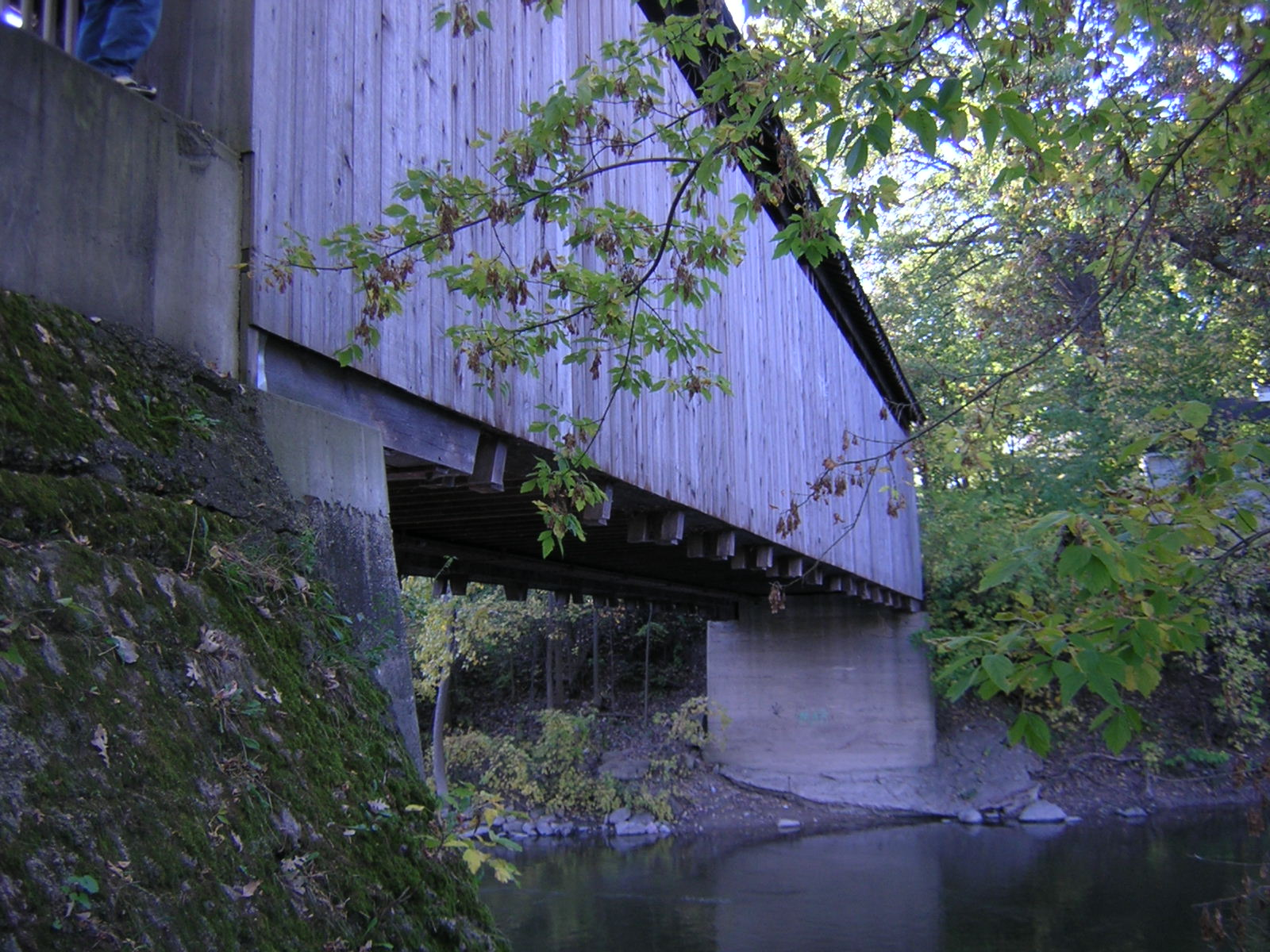
Underside view, showing truss ends protruding from the sheathing.

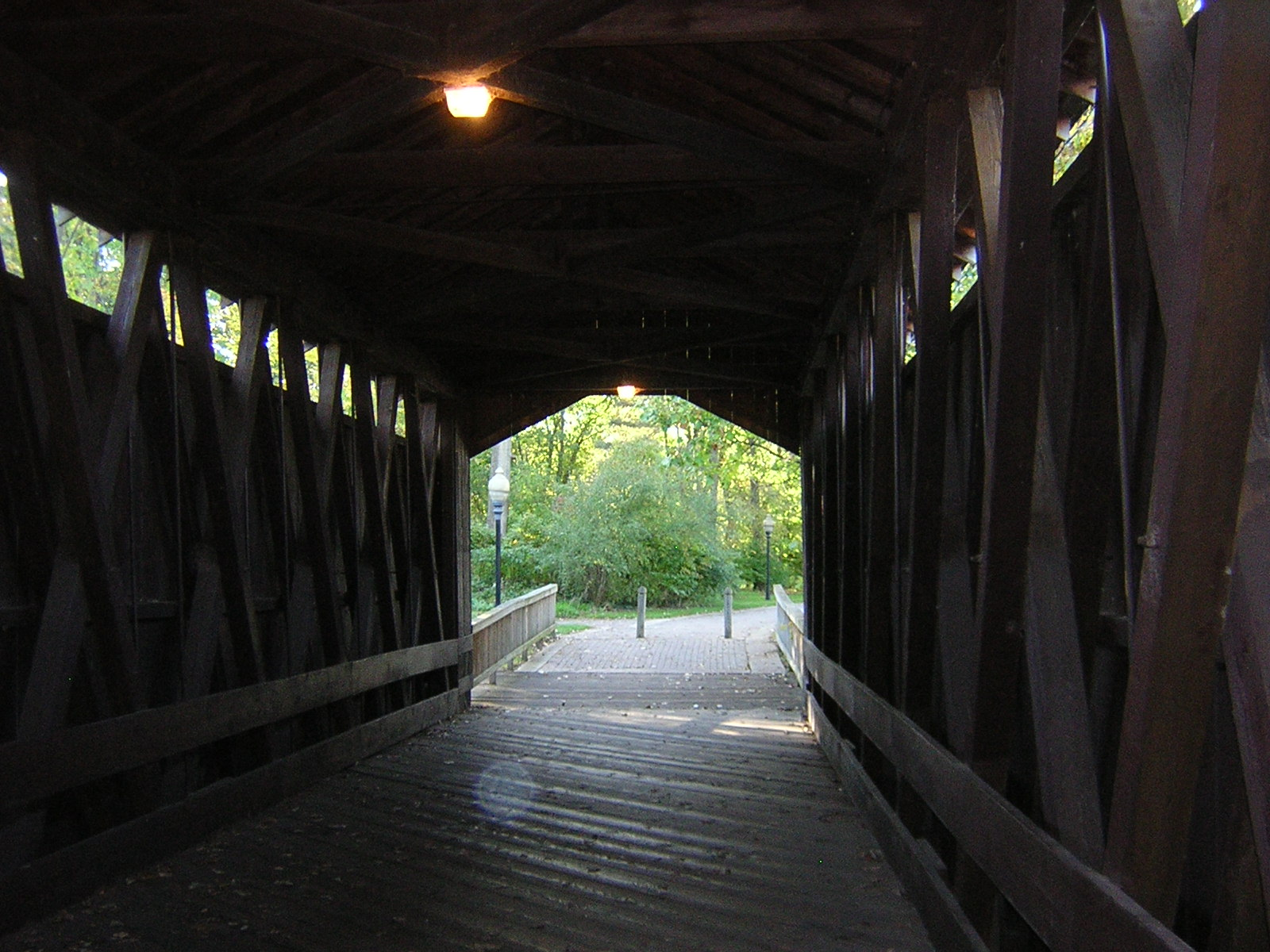
Inside, showing Brown truss stringers.

== See also ==
- List of Michigan covered bridges
- List of Registered Historic Places in Kent County, Michigan
