= Vergennes Township, Michigan =

- Civil township
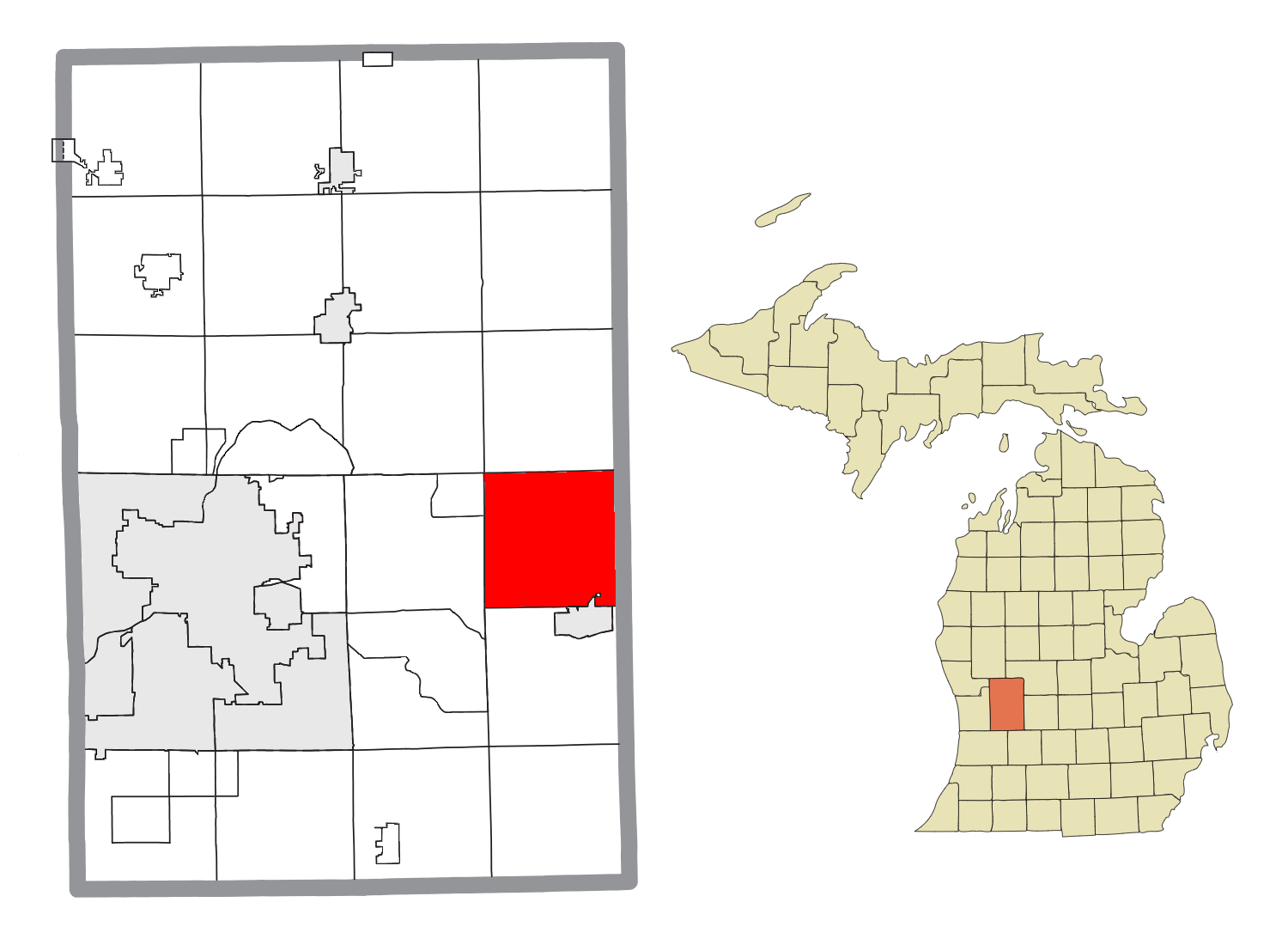
- Location within Kent County

- Location within the state of Michigan Location within the United States
- Coordinates: 42°59′06″N 85°22′03″W
- Country: United States
- State: Michigan
- County: Kent
- Settled: 1836
- Established: 1838

Government
  - Supervisor: Tim Wittenbach
  - Clerk: Shantell Ford

Area
  - Total: 35.39 sq mi (91.66 km^{2})
  - Land: 34.49 sq mi (89.33 km^{2})
  - Water: 0.90 sq mi (2.33 km^{2})
- Elevation: 791 ft (241 m)

Population (2020)
  - Total: 4,741
  - Density: 137.5/sq mi (53.07/km^{2})
- Time zone: UTC-5 (Eastern (EST))
  - Summer (DST): UTC-4 (EDT)
- ZIP Codes: 48809 (Belding); 49301 (Ada); 49331 (Lowell)
- Area code: 616
- FIPS code: 26-081-81920
- GNIS feature ID: 1627193
- Website: Official website

Vergennes Township is a civil township of Kent County in the U.S. state of Michigan. As of the 2020 census, the township population was 4,741.

It is part of the Grand Rapids metropolitan area and is located about 15 miles (24 km) east of the city of Grand Rapids.

== Communities ==
- Fallasburg is an unincorporated community on the eastern side of the township. It began around a grist mill built by J. Wesley Fallass in 1839. Originally named Fallassburgh, the name became Fallasburg in 1893. It had a post office from 1851 until 1901. Fallasburg Bridge over the Flat River is a notable covered bridge in the township.
- Fox's Corner started around the home of James S. Fox in 1836. It had a schoolhouse beginning in 1870.

== History ==
The area was first settled in 1836 by Sylvester Hodges from New York. The first post office as established on August 12, 1837 but was soon discontinued on November 1, 1837. The area was organized as Vergennes Township in 1838. Part of Vergennes Township was split off in 1840 to form part of Caledonia Township (Township 5 North, Range 9 West), eventually removed in 1849 to form Bowne Township. The post office as reestablished on October 9, 1848 until April 14, 1871. The nearby Alton post office was relocated and renamed Vergennes from June 11, 1900 until December 31, 1909.

Vergennes Township is the present-day location of the original Belleville Bridge, which once spanned Belleville Lake within the city of Belleville in Wayne County. This bridge was first constructed in 1925 and later relocated to Vergennes Township in 1985, where it then replaced the old Burroughs Street Bridge crossing the Flat River.

== Geography ==
According to the U.S. Census Bureau, the township has a total area of 35.39 square miles (91.66 km^{2}), of which 34.49 square miles (89.33 km^{2}) is land and 0.90 square miles (2.33 km^{2}) (2.54%) is water.

The Flat River, a tributary of the Grand River, flows through the eastern side of the township.

== Demographics ==
As of the census of 2000, there were 3,611 people, 1,142 households, and 970 families residing in the township. The population density was 104.0 inhabitants per square mile (40.2/km^{2}). There were 1,209 housing units at an average density of 34.8 per square mile (13.4/km^{2}). The racial makeup of the township was 97.48% White, 0.64% African American, 0.19% Native American, 0.78% Asian, 0.47% from other races, and 0.44% from two or more races. Hispanic or Latino of any race were 2.16% of the population.

There were 1,142 households, out of which 48.1% had children under the age of 18 living with them, 76.7% were married couples living together, 5.1% had a female householder with no husband present, and 15.0% were non-families. 11.7% of all households were made up of individuals, and 3.4% had someone living alone who was 65 years of age or older. The average household size was 3.13 and the average family size was 3.39.

In the township, the population was spread out, with 33.5% under the age of 18, 5.2% from 18 to 24, 32.8% from 25 to 44, 21.7% from 45 to 64, and 6.9% who were 65 years of age or older. The median age was 34 years. For every 100 females, there were 103.6 males. For every 100 females age 18 and over, there were 99.8 males.

The median income for a household in the township was $61,500, and the median income for a family was $62,313. Males had a median income of $47,723 versus $31,754 for females. The per capita income for the township was $21,339. About 5.2% of families and 6.2% of the population were below the poverty line, including 5.7% of those under age 18 and 17.6% of those age 65 or over.

== Education ==
The entire township is served by Lowell Area Schools to the south in the city of Lowell.
