= Flat River (Michigan) =

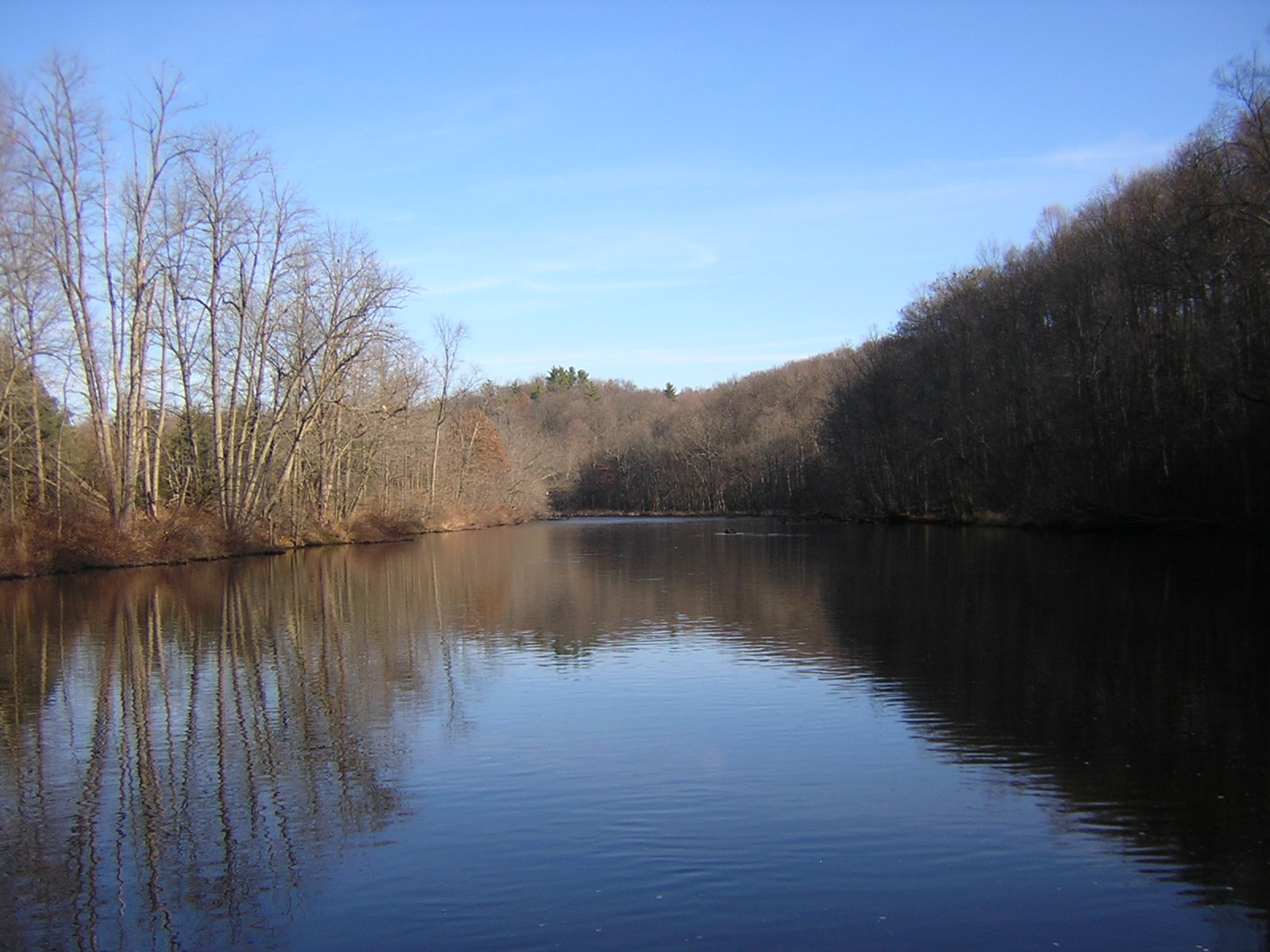
- Flat River upstream from Whites Bridge, Fall 2006

Location
- Country: United States
- State: Michigan
- Counties: Montcalm, Kent, Ionia
- Cities: Belvidere Township, Lowell, Greenville, Belding

Physical characteristics
- Source
  - location: First Lake, Montcalm County
  - coordinates: 43°26′23″N 85°6′7″W
  - elevation: 915 ft (279 m)
- Mouth
  - location: Grand River
  - coordinates: 42°55′40″N 85°20′19″W
  - elevation: 617 ft (188 m)
- Length: 70 mi (110 km)
- Basin size: 560 sq mi (1,500 km^{2})
- Discharge
  - location: mouth
  - average: 530.62 cu ft/s (15.025 m^{3}/s) (estimate)

The Flat River (Ottawa: Quabahquasha, "Winding Stream") is a tributary of the Grand River in the western part of the U.S. state of Michigan. It rises as the outflow of First Lake, the last in a chain of geographically close, connected lakes known as Six Lakes in Belvidere Township, west of Edmore in Montcalm County. It flows mostly south and slightly west through Montcalm County, Ionia County, and Kent County, flowing into the Grand River in Lowell. Other cities it flows through along the way include Greenville and Belding.

The river was an important water route and fishing source for the Grand River Band of Ottawa who lived along it in the 18th and 19th centuries.

Two historic covered bridges cross the river. One, the Fallasburg Bridge, in Vergennes Township, Kent County is in Fallasburg County Park a few miles north of Lowell. The other, Whites Bridge is a few miles to the northeast in adjacent northwest Keene Township, Ionia County, near Smyrna. On July 7, 2013, an arson fire destroyed White's Bridge. Fund-raising efforts are underway in attempt to have the bridge rebuilt. At the time of its destruction, it was the oldest covered bridge of its kind in Michigan.

There are 5 dams along the river: Greenville, Belding, Whites Bridge, Burroughs and Lowell.

It is the river named in the song "Sad Ballad of Jack Haggerty", sometimes known as "Flat River Girl."

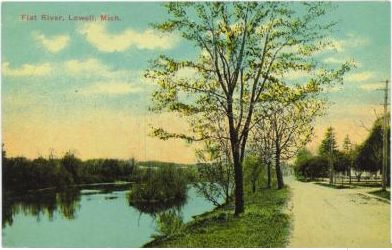
Flat River in Michigan, ca. 1910 vintage postcard
