= Tension member =

A tension member is a structural element designed to carry loads primarily through tensile forces, meaning it is subjected to stretching rather than compression or bending. These members are integral components in engineering and architectural structures, such as trusses, bridges, towers, and suspension systems, where they provide stability, distribute loads, and resist deformation. Typically made from high-strength materials like steel, wire ropes, or composites, tension members are valued for their efficiency in transferring forces along their length while maintaining lightweight and durable construction. Their design and performance are crucial in ensuring the safety and functionality of structures subjected to dynamic and static loads.

== Design ==
Designers typically adhere to standardised design codes when specifying tension members, which are critical components of structural systems. In the United States, the Steel Construction Manual published by the American Institute of Steel Construction (AISC) is the primary reference for structural steel design, while in Europe, the design is guided by the Eurocodes published by the Comité Européen de Normalisation (CEN). These codes provide comprehensive guidelines to ensure the safety, reliability, and efficiency of tension member designs. Other similar design codes are: GB 50017 in China, IS 800 in India and AS 4100 in Australia.

The design of tension members requires careful analysis of potential failure modes, specifically yielding (excessive deformation) and fracture, which are referred to as limit states. The governing limit state is the one that results in the lowest design strength, as it dictates the member's capacity and prevents structural failure.

== Calculation ==
There are two primary methods for evaluating the capacity of a structure and its components to withstand applied loads: Load and Resistance Factor Design (LRFD) and Allowable Stress Design, sometimes referred to as Permissible Stress Design. This section provides an overview of calculations using the LRFD method for tension members in steel structures.

According to the Australian code, the nominal section capacity of a tension member is the lesser of -

$N_t=A_gf_y$ and;

$N_t=0.85k_t A_n f_u$

Where:

$A_g$ = gross area of the cross-section;

$f_y$ = yield stress used in design;

$k_t$= correction factor for the distribution of forces;

$A_n$= net area of cross-section, obtained by deducting from the gross area the cross sectional the area of all penetrations and holes, including fastener holes; and

$f_u$= tensile strength used in design.

The strength of a tension member is satisfactory when -

$N^*\leq \phi N_t$

Where:

$N^*$ = design axial force; and

$\phi$ = capacity factor, which is 0.9 for tension members.

There are similar formulas in the AISC and CEN codes.

A structural analysis or finite element analysis is conducted to determine the design axial force ($N^*$) the tension members of a structure. These calculations are performed for a series of load combinations applied to the structure, as specified by the relevant design code. The following tables show some example load combinations from different codes. (Note that it is important to ensure that the design factors and load cases used in a design are consistently applied from a single code. Mixing factors or load cases from different codes within the same analysis can lead to inaccuracies and non-compliance with design standards.)

AISC Load Combinations
Case	Load Combination
1	1.4(D+F)
2	1.2(D+F+T) + 1.6(L+H) + 0.5(L_{r} or S or R)
3	1.2D + 1.6 (L_{r} or S or R) + (0.5L or 0.8W)
4	1.2D + 1.6W + 0.5L + 0.5(L_{r} or S or R)
5	1.2D+1.0E+0.5L+0.2S
6	0.9D + 1.6W + 1.6H
7	0.9D +1.0E +1.6H
Where: D = dead load or the weight of the structure itself, E = earthquake load, F = load due to fluids with well-defined pressures and maximum heights, L = live load, L_{r} = roof live load, S = the snow load, T = self-straining force, W = wind load.

Eurocode Load Combinations for Single-Storey Buildings
Case	Load Combination
Permanent + imposed load	1.35G_{k} + 1.5Q_{k} + EHF
Permanent + snow load	1.35G_{k} + 1.5S_{k} + EHF
Permanent + snow plus wind	1.35G_{k} + 1.5S_{k} + 0.75W_{k} + EHF
Permanent + wind plus snow	1.35G_{k} + 1.5W_{k} + 0.75S_{k} + EHF
Permanent + wind plus minimum vertical load	1.0G_{k} + 1.5W_{k} + EHF
Permanent + accidental	1.0G_{k} + 1.0A_{d} + 0.2W_{k} + EHF
Where: G_{k} = characteristic value of permanent loads, Q_{k} = characteristic value of variable loads, EHF = equivalent horizontal forces, S_{k} = characteristic value of snow loads, W_{k} = characteristic value of wind loads, A_{d} = Design value of accidental loads.

== See also ==
- Compression member
- Tensile structure
- Guy-wire
