= Coldwater River (Western Michigan) =

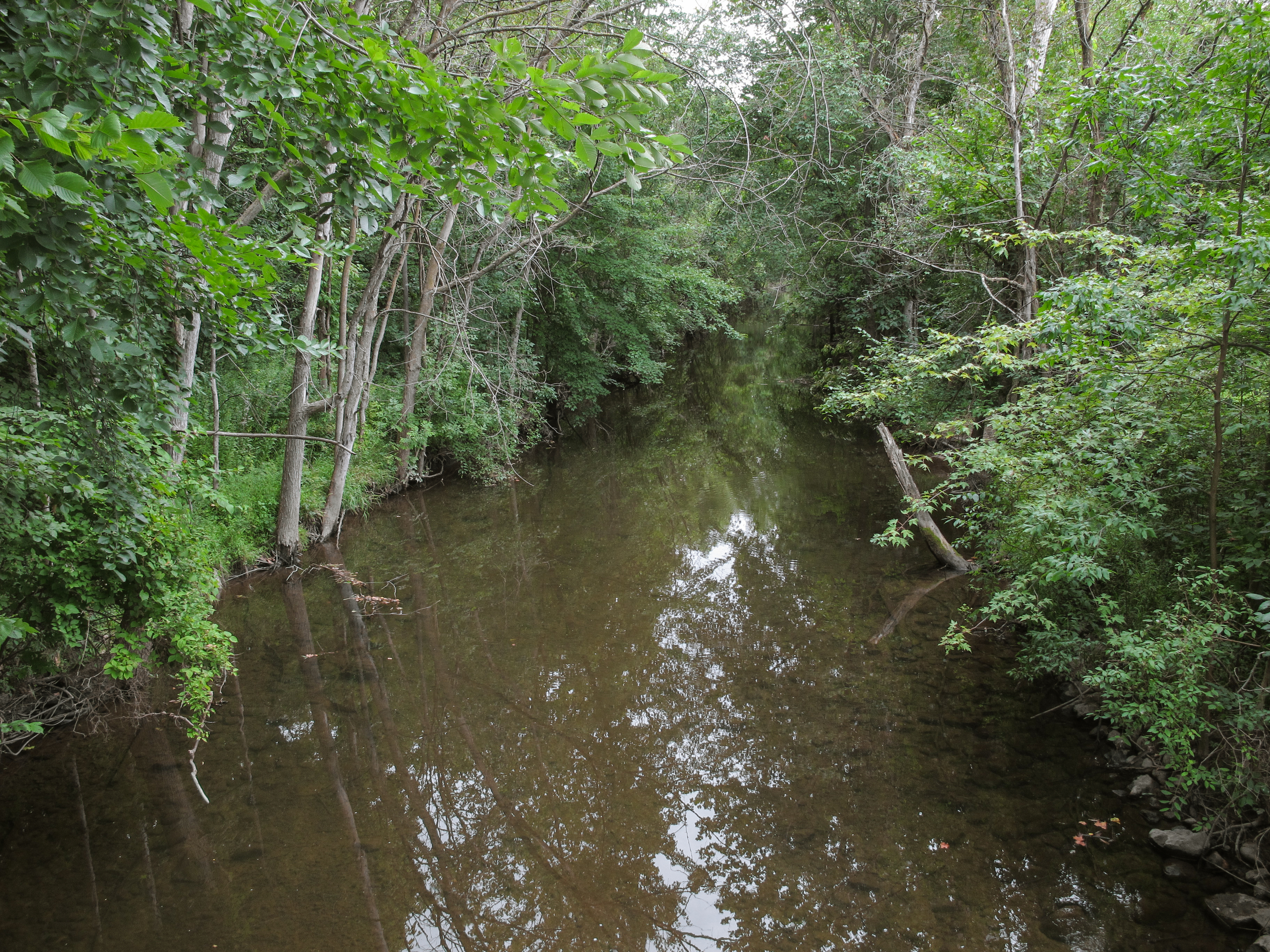
- The Coldwater River in Freeport

Location
- Country: United States
- State: Michigan
- Counties: Barry, Kent

Physical characteristics
- Mouth: Thornapple River
- Length: 19.4 mi (31.2 km)
- Discharge
  - location: mouth
  - average: 190.38 cu ft/s (5.391 m^{3}/s) (estimate)

Basin features
- Progression: Thornapple River—Grand River—Lake Michigan
- River system: Saint Lawrence River

The Coldwater River is a 19.4-mile-long (31.2 km) stream in the U.S. state of Michigan. Located in western Michigan, the river is a part of the Grand River drainage basin.

The Coldwater River flows through Barry and Kent counties, and the drainage basin also includes a large portion of southwest Ionia County and a tiny portion of Sunfield Township in the northwest corner of Eaton County.

The Coldwater is formed from the Little Thornapple River in Carlton Township in Barry County. It flows northerly for a few miles and then flows mostly west until emptying into the Thornapple River in southern Caledonia Township at 42°46′29″N 85°27′38″W.

Major tributaries (from the mouth):

- Clarke and Bunker Drain (draining a complex of small lakes in Bowne Township
- Tyler Creek (AKA Bear Creek), rises from the confluence of Pratt Lake Creek and Bear Creek in eastern Bowne Township
  - Walton Drain, rises in western Campbell Township in Ionia County
    - Bond Drain, rises in western Campbell Township in Ionia County
  - Pratt Lake Drain, rises from the outflow of Pratt Lake in southeast Lowell Township
    - Kilgus Branch, rises in southeast Lowell Township
  - Bear Creek, rises in southern Boston Township, just north of the village of Clarksville
    - Peddler Lake Drain, rises from the outflow of Peddler Lake in Campbell Township
- Duck Creek, rises in northeast Odessa Township in Ionia County
- Geieger Drain, rises in northeast Irving Township, just west of the village of Freeport, in Barry County
- Stecklee Drain, a small drain on the east side of Freeport
- Bullhead Drain, rises in eastern Irving Township, south of Freeport
- Bird Drain, rises in western Carlton Township in Barry County
- Messer Brook, rises in southwest Odessa Township, just northwest of the village of Lake Odessa
  - Kart Creek, rises in eastern Campbell Township
- Drainage from Lower Lake in south central Carlton Township
- Little Thornapple River, rises from the outflow of Jordan Lake
  - Mallson Ditch/Drain, rising in northeast Carlton Township
  - Woodland Creek, rises near the village of Woodland in Woodland Township
  - Jordan Lake, on the boundary between Barry and Ionia counties
  - Tupper Lake, in Odessa Township, Ionia County
    - Tupper Creek, rises in western Sebewa Township in Ionia County
