= Michigan's 87th House of Representatives district =

American legislative district

Michigan's 87th State House of Representatives district
Representative
Will Snyder; D–Muskegon
- Demographics: 62.7% White; 21.5% Black; 8.3% Hispanic; 0.6% Asian; 0.5% Native American; 0.1% Hawaiian/Pacific Islander; 0.1% Other; 6.2% Multiracial
- Population (2024): 89,781

Michigan's 87th House of Representatives district (also referred to as Michigan's 87th House district) is a legislative district within the Michigan House of Representatives located in part of Muskegon County. The district was created in 1965, when the Michigan House of Representatives district naming scheme changed from a county-based system to a numerical one.

== List of representatives ==
Representative	Party	Dates	Residence	Notes
Blair G. Woodman	Republican	1965–1968	Owosso	
Bill Ballenger	Republican	1969–1970	Ovid	
R. Douglas Trezise	Republican	1971–1974	Owosso	
Francis R. Spaniola	Democratic	1975–1990	Corunna	
Clark A. Harder	Democratic	1991–1992	Owosso	
Robert G. Bender	Republican	1993–1994	Middleville	
Terry Geiger	Republican	1995–2000	Lake Odessa	
Gary A. Newell	Republican	2001–2006	Saranac	
Brian Calley	Republican	2007–2010	Portland	
Mike Callton	Republican	2011–2016	Nashville	
Julie Calley	Republican	2017–2022	Portland	
Will Snyder	Democratic	2023–present	Muskegon	

== Recent elections ==
=== 2020s ===
2026 Michigan House of Representatives election
Party	Candidate	Votes	%
Democratic	Will Snyder (incumbent)	22,675	65.55
Republican	Cody A. Chipman	11,916	34.45
Total votes		34,591	100
Democratic hold			

2018 Michigan House of Representatives election
Party	Candidate	Votes	%
Republican	Julie Calley	27,515	67.56
Democratic	Shawn Marie Winters	13,213	32.44
Total votes		40,728	100
Republican hold			

2016 Michigan House of Representatives election
Party	Candidate	Votes	%
Republican	Julie Calley	30,957	67.08%
Democratic	Eric Anderson	12,955	28.07%
Libertarian	Joseph P. Gillotte	2,238	4.85%
Total votes		46,150	100.00%
Republican hold			

2014 Michigan House of Representatives election
Party	Candidate	Votes	%
Republican	Mike Callton	20,355	66.67
Democratic	Jordan Brehm	10,178	33.33
Total votes		30,533	100.0
Republican hold			

2012 Michigan House of Representatives election
Party	Candidate	Votes	%
Republican	Mike Callton	26,454	61.63
Democratic	Sherry Anderson	14,937	34.80
Libertarian	Joseph Gillotte	1,533	3.57
Total votes		42,924	100.0
Republican hold			

2010 Michigan House of Representatives election
Party	Candidate	Votes	%
Republican	Mike Callton	22,308	71.87
Democratic	Greg Grieves	8,731	28.13
Total votes		31,039	100.0
Republican hold			

2008 Michigan House of Representatives election
Party	Candidate	Votes	%
Republican	Brian Calley	29,582	64.05
Democratic	Greg Grieves	14,359	31.09
Constitution	Phillip Adams	1,267	2.74
Libertarian	Joseph Gillotte	975	2.11
Total votes		46,183	100.0
Republican hold			

== Historical district boundaries ==
Map	Description	Apportionment Plan	Notes
	Clinton County (part): Bath Township; Bingham Township; DeWitt Township; Olive Township; Ovid Township; St. Johns; Victor Township; Shiawassee County	1964 Apportionment Plan	
	Clinton County (part): Bath Township (part); Victor Township; Genesee County (part): Excluding; Argentine Township; Atlas Township; Burton Township; Clayton Township; Clio; Davison; Davison Township; Fenton; Fenton Township; Flint; Flint Township; Forest Township; Gaines Township; Genesee Township; Grand Blanc; Grand Blanc Township; Montrose Township; Mount Morris; Mount Morris Township (part); Mundy Township; Richfield Township; Thetford Township; Vienna Township; Shiawassee County (part): Excluding; Fairfield Township	1972 Apportionment Plan	
	Livingston County (part): Cohoctah Township; Deerfield Township; Oceola Township; Shiawassee County	1982 Apportionment Plan	
	Barry County Ionia County (part): Belding; Berlin Township; Boston Township; Campbell Township; Easton Township; Ionia (part); Keene Township; Odessa Township; Otisco Township	1992 Apportionment Plan	
	Barry County Ionia County (part): Berlin Township (part); Boston Township; Campbell Township; Danby Township; Ionia (part); Ionia Township (part); Lyons Township; North Plains Township; Odessa Township; Orange Township; Portland; Portland Township; Ronald Township; Sebewa Township	2001 Apportionment Plan	
	Barry County Ionia County (part): Berlin Township (part); Boston Township; Campbell Township; Danby Township; Keene Township; Lyons Township; North Plains Township; Odessa Township; Orange Township; Portland; Portland Township; Ronald Township; Sebewa Township	2011 Apportionment Plan	
