= Little Thornapple River (Coldwater River tributary) =

Location
- Country: United States

Physical characteristics
- Source
  - location: Jordan Lake in Woodland Township, Barry County, Michigan
- Mouth
  - location: Coldwater River
  - elevation: 797 ft (243 m)
- Discharge
  - location: mouth
  - average: 45.2 cu ft/s (1.28 m^{3}/s) (estimate)

Basin features
- River system: Grand River

The Little Thornapple River is a 5.8-mile-long (9.3 km) river in Barry County in the U.S. state of Michigan.

The Little Thornapple rises from the outflow of Jordan Lake in north-central Woodland Township, at coordinates 42°45′38″N 85°08′43″W.

The stream flows primarily southwest and empties into the Coldwater River in central Carlton Township at coordinates 42°42′50″N 85°13′41″W.

The Little Thornapple, with Jordan Lake tributaries, forms an important part of the upper Coldwater River watershed. The Little Thornapple is considered to form the headwaters of the Coldwater River.

Lake Jordan is fed primarily by the outflow of Tupper Lake, which in turn is fed by Tupper Creek all in Odessa and Sebewa townships in Ionia County.
