= Jordan Lake (disambiguation) =

Jordan Lake can refer to:

- Jordan Lake (Alabama), US
- Jordan Lake (Guysborough), in Nova Scotia, Canada
- Jordan Lake (Michigan), US
- Jordan Lake, North Carolina, US
  - Jordan Lake State Recreation Area
- Jordan Lake (Nova Scotia), in Shelburne District, Canada
- Jordan Lake (Utah), US
- The Jordan Lake Sessions, a set of live albums by The Mountain Goats.
