= Portland Public Schools (Michigan) =

School district in Michigan

Address
- 1100 Ionia Road Portland, Ionia, Michigan, 48875; United States

District information
- Grades: Pre-Kindergarten-12
- Superintendent: William Heath
- Schools: 4
- Budget: $33,610,000 2022-2023 expenditures
- NCES District ID: 2629120

Students and staff
- Students: 1,993 (2024-2025)
- Teachers: 121.53 (on an FTE basis) (2024-2025)
- Staff: 293.64 FTE (2024-2025)
- Student–teacher ratio: 16.4 (2024-2025)

Other information
- Website: www.portlandk12.org

Portland Public Schools is a public school district in West Michigan. In Ionia County, it serves Portland and parts of the townships of Danby, Lyons, Orange, Portland, and Sebewa. In Clinton County, it serves parts of Eagle Township and Westphalia Township.

== History ==
The first graduating class of Portland High School was in 1882. On October 15, 1918, the high school (then known as Portland Union Schoolhouse) burned in a suspicious fire. Orchestra students were practicing in the school that evening when they discovered flames, and they chased the arson suspect, but he outran them.

Portland's school board hired architect Thomas E. White of Lansing to design a new high school. It was built in 1919 at the intersection of Elm Street and Brush Street. Oak Street Elementary, now known as Oakwood Elementary, was built in 1952.

A new Portland High School opened in 1963 near Oakwood Elementary. In 1989, when the current high school opened, it became the district's middle school.

== Schools ==
Schools in Portland Public Schools district
School	Address	Notes
Oakwood Elementary	500 Oak Street, Portland	Grades PreK-2. Built 1952.
Westwood Elementary	883 Cross Street, Portland	Grades 3–5. Built 1975.
Portland Middle School	745 Storz Ave., Portland	Grades 6–8. Built 1962.
Portland High School	1100 Ionia Rd., Portland	Grades 9–12. Built 1989.
PACE Alternative-Virtual-Adult	1090 Ionia Rd., Portland	Alternative high school, online learning, and adult education. Built 2002.
