= Lake Odessa, Michigan =

- Village
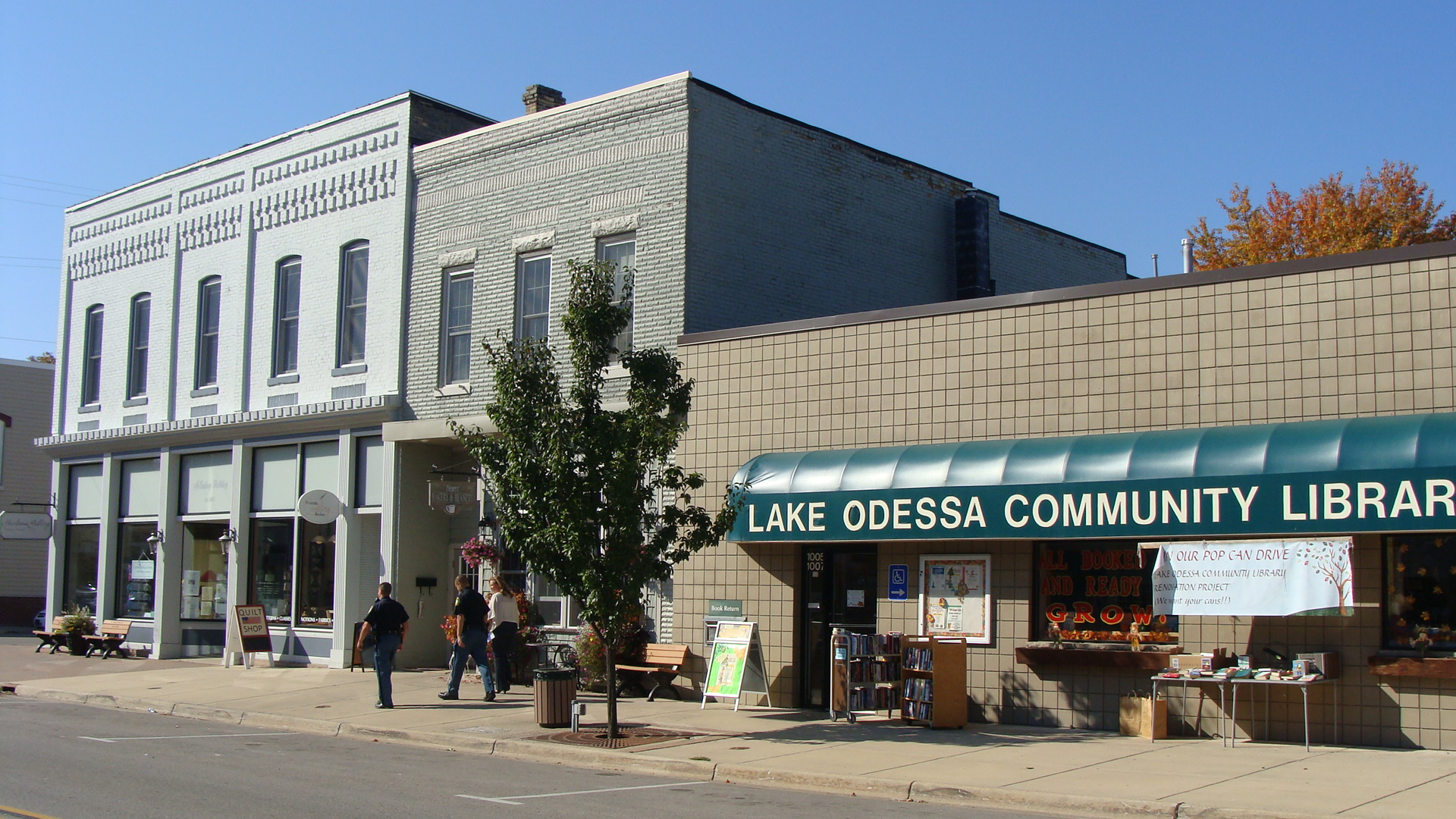
- Main Street in October 2011
- Nickname: "Lake O"
- Location of Lake Odessa, Michigan
- Coordinates: 42°46′57″N 85°08′15″W
- Country: United States
- State: Michigan
- County: Ionia

Area
  - Total: 0.89 sq mi (2.31 km^{2})
  - Land: 0.89 sq mi (2.30 km^{2})
  - Water: 0 sq mi (0.00 km^{2})
- Elevation: 850 ft (260 m)

Population (2020)
  - Total: 1,994
  - Density: 2,241.7/sq mi (865.52/km^{2})
- Time zone: UTC-5 (Eastern (EST))
  - Summer (DST): UTC-4 (EDT)
- ZIP code: 48849
- Area code: 616
- FIPS code: 26-44880
- GNIS feature ID: 2398383
- Website: Village website

Lake Odessa is a village in Ionia County of the U.S. state of Michigan. As of the 2020 census, Lake Odessa had a population of 1,994. It is located in the southern portion of the county in Odessa Township on the northeast shore of Jordan Lake, which is the boundary with Barry County.

Since 1987, Lake Odessa has been named a "Tree City USA" by the National Arbor Day Foundation.

== History ==
The area near modern day Lake Odessa was first settled by members of the Russell family in 1839, and named the "Russell Settlement". The area was later renamed "Bonanza", and a post office was established here on May 17th, 1880, by Postmaster Horace F. Miner.

When the Detroit, Lansing and Northern Railroad (later the Pere Marquette Railroad) was built through the area in the 1880s, the village was moved about a mile southwest. At that time the name was changed to "Lake Odessa", derived from the nearby Jordan Lake and the name of Odessa Township, which had been established in 1846. The township had been named for the city of Odesa in Ukraine, reflecting an interest of one of the founders in Ukraine as well as a desire for a distinctive name. Investor Humphrey Wager purchased 80 acres (320,000 m^{2}) of farmland on Jordan Lake and platted the village in 1887. With the advantage of a station on the new railroad, the new village quickly eclipsed the former settlement at Bonanza. The village incorporated in 1889. John R. Waite, a local man with an interest in history, has been credited with significant historical research for the village of Lake Odessa. John is also recognized as the President of the Lake Odessa Area Historical Society and is involved with the Train Depot Museum.

== Lake Odessa Community Library ==
The village is also home to the Lake Odessa Community Library, located at 1007 Fourth Ave, whose hours are as follows:

Day	Times
Monday	Closed
Tuesday	9am-7pm
Wednesday	9am-5pm
Thursday	9am-7pm
Friday	9am-5pm
Saturday	9am-12pm
Sunday	Closed

The library boasts over 25,000 books, DVDs, and other resources in addition to offering wireless internet and hot spots, which are available to take home, copy, scanning, lamination, notary, and fax service. They have many non-book items that are available for check-out as well, which includes a metal detector, power tools, a typewriter, sewing machines, and a Cricut system. They also host book discussion, author events, story time, and yoga classes. Their digital collection includes ebooks, audiobooks, emagazines, movies, TV shows, and music as well as access to a new Libby Collection. The eShelf and research section is available to Michigan residents or Michigan library or school access only, which contains resources such as MyHeritage Library Edition, Consumer Reports, Newspaper Source Plus, Auto Repair Source, LearningExpress Library, Small Engine Repair Reference Center, AtoZDatabases, MasterFILE, eBooks Public Library, MeLCat, and Novelist Plus.

In 2014, the library underwent a $625,000 renovation and moved to a temporary relocation on Velte Road. The library is housed in an old movie theater, the Lake Theater (previously named the Diamond Theater), which was opened pre-1914. The renovation expanded the library, creating spaces for a new meeting room, expansion of the technology space, and separate areas for children and teenagers. Fox 17 reported, “super high ceilings, real brick, steel columns, granite counter tops, computers, and wifi ready. The plans also included removing part of the adjoining wall to Meyers Bakery and Beanery.”

== Geography ==
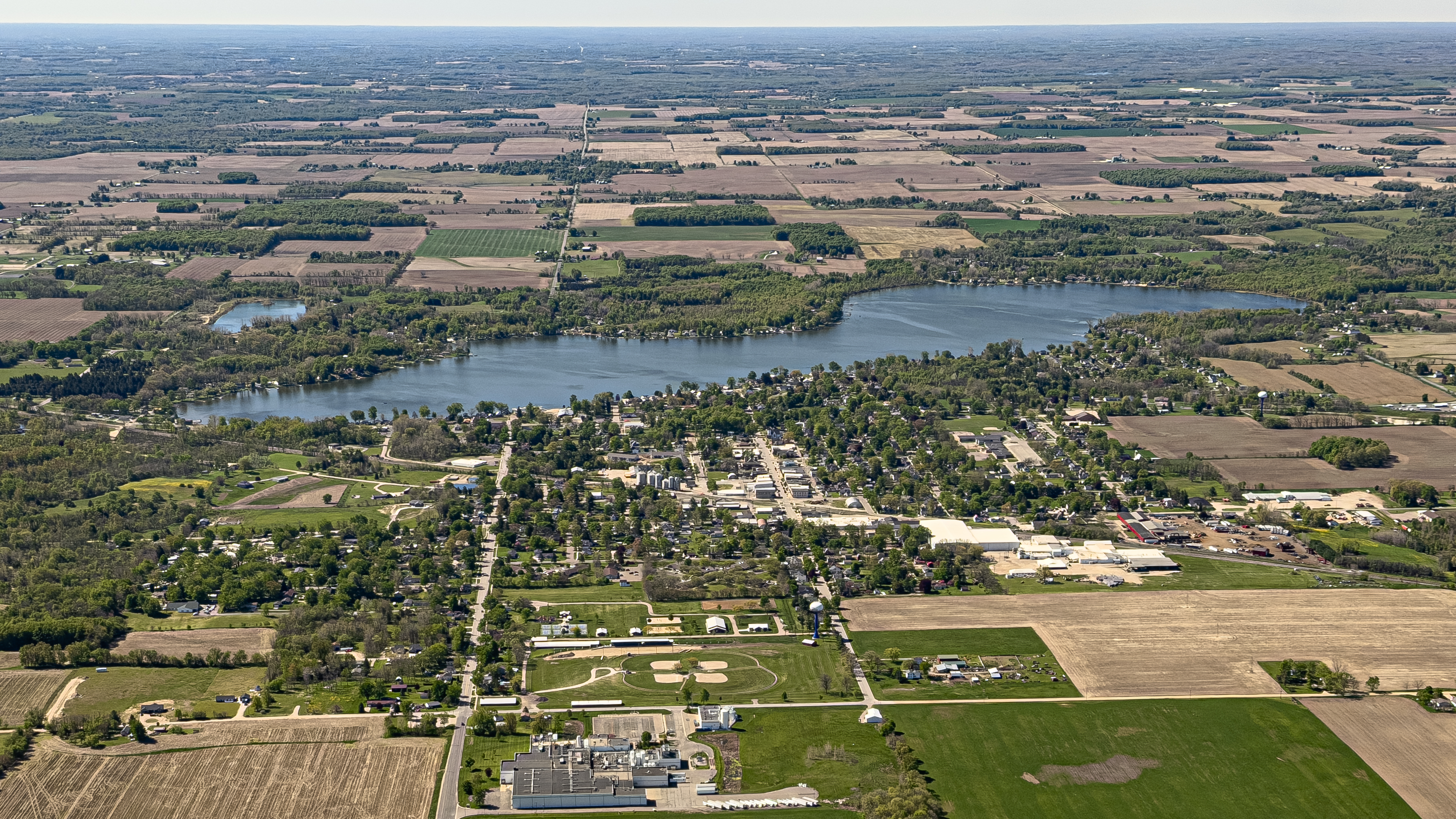
Aerial image of Lake Odessa's location beside Jordan Lake

According to the United States Census Bureau, the village has a total area of 0.89 square miles (2.31 km^{2}), all land. Lake Odessa, along with neighboring Woodland, Sunfield and Clarksville, make up the Lakewood Public School district.

== Demographics ==
Historical population
Census	Pop.	Note	%±
1890	635		—
1900	1,037		63.3%
1910	1,222		17.8%
1920	1,246		2.0%
1930	1,220		−2.1%
1940	1,417		16.1%
1950	1,596		12.6%
1960	1,806		13.2%
1970	1,924		6.5%
1980	2,171		12.8%
1990	2,256		3.9%
2000	2,272		0.7%
2010	2,018		−11.2%
2020	1,994		−1.2%
U.S. Decennial Census

=== 2020 census ===
As of the 2020 census, Lake Odessa had a population of 1,994. The median age was 38.1 years. 23.9% of residents were under the age of 18 and 17.3% of residents were 65 years of age or older. For every 100 females there were 90.6 males, and for every 100 females age 18 and over there were 87.3 males age 18 and over.

0.0% of residents lived in urban areas, while 100.0% lived in rural areas.

There were 863 households in Lake Odessa, of which 29.7% had children under the age of 18 living in them. Of all households, 40.8% were married-couple households, 19.8% were households with a male householder and no spouse or partner present, and 30.5% were households with a female householder and no spouse or partner present. About 33.4% of all households were made up of individuals and 13.9% had someone living alone who was 65 years of age or older.

There were 951 housing units, of which 9.3% were vacant. The homeowner vacancy rate was 1.3% and the rental vacancy rate was 7.1%.

Racial composition as of the 2020 census
Race	Number	Percent
White	1,803	90.4%
Black or African American	14	0.7%
American Indian and Alaska Native	9	0.5%
Asian	11	0.6%
Native Hawaiian and Other Pacific Islander	0	0.0%
Some other race	48	2.4%
Two or more races	109	5.5%
Hispanic or Latino (of any race)	147	7.4%

=== 2010 census ===
As of the census of 2010, there were 2,018 people, 835 households, and 534 families living in the village. The population density was 2,267.4 inhabitants per square mile (875.4/km^{2}). There were 950 housing units at an average density of 1,067.4 per square mile (412.1/km^{2}). The racial makeup of the village was 91.4% White, 0.1% African American, 0.4% Native American, 0.8% Asian, 4.2% from other races, and 3.1% from two or more races. Hispanic or Latino of any race were 10.3% of the population.

There were 835 households, of which 35.2% had children under the age of 18 living with them, 40.7% were married couples living together, 17.7% had a female householder with no husband present, 5.5% had a male householder with no wife present, and 36.0% were non-families. 31.1% of all households were made up of individuals, and 12.1% had someone living alone who was 65 years of age or older. The average household size was 2.41 and the average family size was 2.98.

The median age in the village was 34.6 years. 27% of residents were under the age of 18; 9.3% were between the ages of 18 and 24; 26.6% were from 25 to 44; 23.5% were from 45 to 64; and 13.5% were 65 years of age or older. The gender makeup of the village was 48.3% male and 51.7% female.

=== 2000 census ===
As of the census of 2000, there were 2,272 people, 892 households, and 600 families living in the village. The population density was 2,767.8 inhabitants per square mile (1,068.7/km^{2}). There were 977 housing units at an average density of 1,190.2 per square mile (459.5/km^{2}). The racial makeup of the village was 95.16% White, 0.13% African American, 0.66% Native American, 0.57% Asian, 2.77% from other races, and 0.70% from two or more races. Hispanic or Latino of any race were 6.07% of the population.

There were 892 households, out of which 36.3% had children under the age of 18 living with them, 47.8% were married couples living together, 14.5% had a female householder with no husband present, and 32.7% were non-families. 28.3% of all households were made up of individuals, and 13.9% had someone living alone who was 65 years of age or older. The average household size was 2.54 and the average family size was 3.08.

In the village, the population was spread out, with 30.5% under the age of 18, 8.7% from 18 to 24, 27.2% from 25 to 44, 19.9% from 45 to 64, and 13.7% who were 65 years of age or older. The median age was 33 years. For every 100 females, there were 84.0 males. For every 100 females age 18 and over, there were 81.6 males.

The median income for a household in the village was $34,896, and the median income for a family was $41,379. Males had a median income of $32,961 versus $25,787 for females. The per capita income for the village was $19,822. About 5.5% of families and 8.8% of the population were below the poverty line, including 6.8% of those under age 18 and 7.0% of those age 65 or over.
