= Will Snyder (politician) =

American politician from Michigan

- Snyder in 2024

Member of the Michigan House of Representatives from the 87th district
- Incumbent
- Assumed office January 1, 2023
- Preceded by: Julie Calley

Personal details
- Born: February 8, 1993 (age 33) Muskegon, Michigan
- Party: Democratic
- Education: Muskegon Community College
- Profession: politician

Will Snyder (born February 8, 1993) is an American Democratic politician from Michigan. He was elected to the Michigan House of Representatives from the 87th district in the 2022 election. He was reelected in 2024.

== Early life and career ==
Snyder was born February 8, 1993, in Muskegon, Michigan. He graduated from Mona Shores High School and Muskegon Community College. Snyder worked was a legislative aide and district director for state representative Terry Sabo, served on the board of directors of Read Muskegon, and was building association president for the Knights of Columbus Dan M. Kennedy Council #706.

== Political positions ==
In March 2025, Snyder broke party lines to vote in favor of a resolution urging enforcement of the federal ban on transgender girls in women’s sports (HR 0040), but later in August voted against House Bill 4066, which would have codified such restrictions into Michigan law.
