= Mike Callton =

American politician (born 1958)

Mike Callton, D.C.

Member of the Michigan House of Representatives from the 87th district
- In office January 1, 2011 – December 31, 2016
- Preceded by: Brian Calley
- Succeeded by: Julie Calley

Personal details
- Party: Republican
- Spouse: Shelly Callton
- Profession: Chiropractor / Politician

Michael N. Callton, D.C. (born 1958) was the Republican State Representative representing the 87th District. He is also a practicing Chiropractor in his home town of Nashville, MI. He was elected in 2010 to the Michigan House of Representatives, and served as Vice Chair of the House Health Policy Committee, and was a member of the Insurance Policy Committee and the House Military, Veterans' Affairs & Homeland Security Committee.

== Biography ==
Callton is the owner of Nashville Chiropractic Center. Prior to being elected to the State House, Callton served six years on the Barry County Commission. He also served as a member of the Nashville Village Council as well as the Maple Valley Board of Education. Callton earned a biology degree from Michigan State University in 1981; going on to serve in the U.S. Army from 1982 to 1985. After leaving the army, he went on to earn a Doctorate of Chiropractic from the National University of Health Sciences in 1989. In 2013 he won the Michigan Association of Chiropractors' Chiropractor of the Year award.

== Legislative Work ==
=== Medical Marijuana ===
Representative Callton has worked on refining Michigan's Medical Marihuana Law, and has sponsored bills relating to patient safety. On January 26, 2012, Callton, along with Michigan's 5th Circuit Court Judge Amy McDowell and Medical Marihuana Activist Ken Bayer, held a discussion panel-style townhall in Hastings, MI, which was well attended.

Callton also introduced HB 5580 of 2012, a bill to create and regulate "Provisioning Centers," a form of Medical Marihuana Dispensary. This bill would put the power to authorize dispensaries into the hands of the local municipal or township governments, and allow for these "Provisioning Centers" to buy overage from registered patients, and allow for the resale to other qualified patients.

=== Presidential Citizenship Verification Bill ===
In 2011, Callton sponsored legislation to enforce citizenship requirements on presidential candidates by requiring the Secretary of State to verify that all presidential candidates meet the constitutional requirement of "Natural born" by presenting their birth certificate before being placed on the ballot.

== Controversy ==
In June 2012, while speaking on the House Floor in opposition to a bill package dealing with abortion, Representative Lisa Brown invoked her Jewish faith as a point of debate on the subject. She concluded with the comment, "Mr. Speaker, I'm flattered that you're all so interested in my vagina, but 'no' means 'no.'" Majority Floor Leader Jim Stamas, R-Midland, determined Brown's comments violated the decorum of the House and barred her from speaking for a one-day period. Brown was gaveled off the floor and prohibited from speaking along with Representative Barb Byrum, who proposed a ban on vasectomies. On June 14, the Detroit News quoted Callton's take on Brown's comments. "What she said was offensive ... It was so offensive, I don't even want to say it in front of women. I would not say that in mixed company," he said. "It's just an extremely offensive statement." Callton, who is also Jewish, said he consulted his rabbi and believes Brown's interpretation of the Talmud as it relates to abortion is incorrect.

The bill that prompted Brown's comments was passed by a vote of 70-39 with one representative not voting.
