= Brian Calley =

American politician (born 1977)

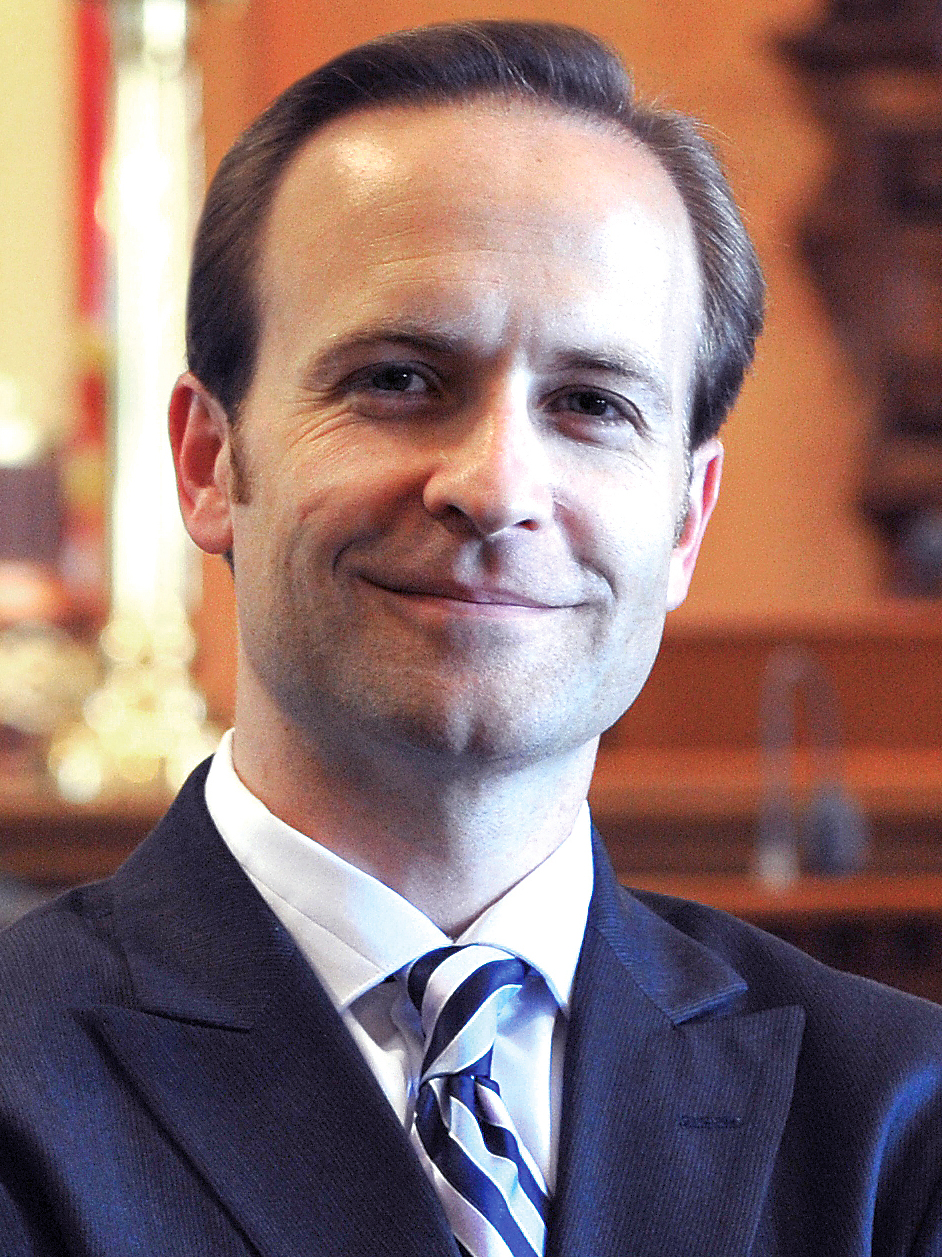
- Calley in 2012

63rd Lieutenant Governor of Michigan
- In office January 1, 2011 – January 1, 2019
- Governor: Rick Snyder
- Preceded by: John D. Cherry
- Succeeded by: Garlin Gilchrist

Member of the Michigan House of Representatives from the 87th district
- In office January 1, 2007 – January 1, 2011
- Preceded by: Gary Newell
- Succeeded by: Mike Callton

Personal details
- Born: Brian Nelson Calley; March 25, 1977 (age 49) Dearborn, Michigan, U.S.
- Party: Republican
- Spouse: Julie Calley
- Education: Montcalm Community College; Michigan State University (BA); Grand Valley State University (MBA); Harvard University (MPA)

Brian Nelson Calley (born March 25, 1977) is an American politician who served as the 63rd lieutenant governor of Michigan from 2011 to 2019. A member of the Republican Party, he was previously elected to the Michigan House of Representatives from 2007 to 2011. He currently serves as president of the Small Business Association of Michigan, and as a member of the board of trustees of Oakland University.

Calley is known for his advocacy for people with autism and their families; his daughter is autistic. Calley campaigned to require Michigan health insurance plans to include coverage for autism therapies, signing into law a package providing for such reforms as acting governor.

== Early life and political career ==
Calley was born in Dearborn, the third of six children. The family moved from Dearborn Heights to Fort Riley, Kansas, in 1982 where his father was stationed in the U.S. Army. Two years later, the family moved back to Michigan where Calley graduated from Ionia High School in 1994. After attending Montcalm Community College while a student at Ionia High School, he earned a bachelor's degree in business administration from Michigan State University in 1998 and a Master's in Business Administration from Grand Valley State University in 2000. In the 10 years preceding his election to the Michigan legislature, Calley held various positions within the banking industry, primarily making commercial loans. During this time he served two terms on Ionia County Board of Commissioners, both as Vice Chairperson.

Calley was elected to the Michigan House of Representatives in 2006 and re-elected in 2008. He served both terms in the minority, with the 2009–2010 term seeing the smallest Republican caucus in 40 years. In the House he gained a reputation as an expert on tax policy and served as minority vice chair of the House Tax Policy Committee. He was named the 2008 "Legislator of the Year” by the state's Small Business Association, the first time a freshman lawmaker has received that designation.

In 2010, despite securing the Republican nomination for state Senate days earlier, Calley was announced as gubernatorial candidate Rick Snyder's running mate. Tea Party supporters from west Michigan momentarily contested Calley's nomination during the state Republican Convention at Michigan State University's Breslin Center in favor of Bill Cooper, a Norton Shores businessman and former candidate for Congress. Cooper withdrew his name from consideration and publicly threw his support behind Calley. In securing the nomination for lieutenant governor, the state Senate nomination was vacated and former state Representative Judy Emmons was chosen to fill the spot.

Snyder and Calley went on to defeat Lansing Mayor Virgil Bernero and his running mate, Southfield Mayor Brenda Lawrence in the general election by 58% to 39%.

== Lieutenant Governor (2011–2019) ==
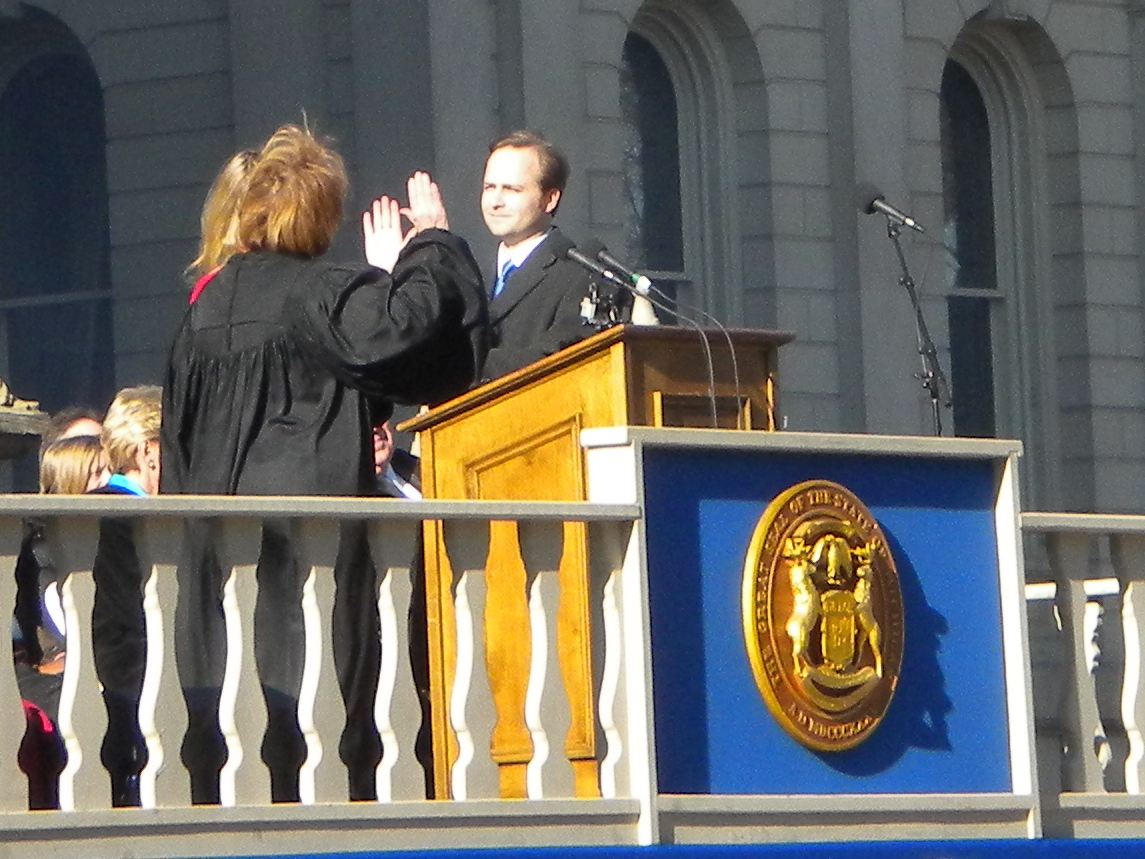
Lieutenant Governor Calley takes the oath of office from Michigan Supreme Court Chief Justice Marilyn Kelly

Calley assumed office as the nation's youngest lieutenant governor and Michigan's youngest lieutenant governor since John Swainson in 1959. Calley undertook an active role in the Snyder administration.

In early 2011, Calley broke a 19–19 deadlock in the Michigan Senate, voting in favor of a massive tax reform package that eliminated the Michigan Business Tax and replaced it with a flat, six-percent corporate income tax. The package, a major goal of the Snyder administration, also reduced the state's individual income tax rate from 4.35 percent to 4.25 percent starting on January 1, 2013, and eliminated most of the state's exemptions and deductions.

For two years, he attended weekly classes at the John F. Kennedy School of Government at Harvard University before receiving his Master of Public Administration in spring 2015.

In May 2017, Calley announced a campaign to make the legislature part-time.

Calley unsuccessfully ran to succeed Snyder in the 2018 Michigan gubernatorial election. On August 7, 2018, he lost the Republican primary, receiving 25% of the vote, placing second behind Michigan state Attorney General Bill Schuette who eventually lost the general election on November 6, 2018 to Democrat Gretchen Whitmer.

== Autism advocacy ==
Calley, whose daughter Reagan is autistic, is known for his outspoken advocacy for autism awareness. As a state lawmaker Calley served on the Health Policy Committee and supported autism insurance reform - unaware his own child actually had the disorder. He stated he first suspected his daughter's condition during a committee hearing as parents of autistic children shared their similar experiences.

As lieutenant governor, Calley is widely credited for leading a successful legislative push to require that insurance companies cover treatments for autism. He signed the bills into law as acting governor while Rick Snyder was on an unannounced trip to Afghanistan. Citing these efforts, Calley was named the 2011 "Executive Champion” by the national autism advocacy organization Autism Speaks.

== Electoral history ==
=== 2018 Michigan gubernatorial Republican primary ===
Republican primary results
Party	Candidate	Votes	%
Republican	Bill Schuette	499,837	50.7
Republican	Brian Calley	248,047	25.2
Republican	Patrick Colbeck	129,102	13.1
Republican	Jim Hines	108,263	11.0
Total votes		985,249	100.0

=== As Lt. Governor (with Governor) ===
Michigan gubernatorial election, 2014
Party	Candidate	Votes	%	±%
Republican	Rick Snyder (incumbent) Brian N. Calley (incumbent)	1,607,399	50.92%	−7.19%
Democratic	Mark Schauer Lisa Brown	1,479,057	46.86%	+6.96%
Libertarian	Mary Buzuma Scott Boman	35,723	1.13%	+0.44%
Constitution	Mark McFarlin Richard Mendoza	19,368	0.61%	−0.04%
Green	Paul Homenuik Candace R. Caveny	14,934	0.47%	−0.17%
Write-ins		50	0.00%	0.00%
Majority		128,342	4.06%	−14.15%
Turnout		3,156,531		−2.16%
Republican hold		Swing		

Michigan Gubernatorial election, 2010
Party	Candidate	Votes	%	±%
Republican	Rick Snyder Brian N. Calley	1,874,834	58.11%	+15.81%
Democratic	Virgil Bernero Brenda Lawrence	1,287,320	39.90%	−16.46%
Libertarian	Ken Proctor Erwin Haas	22,390	0.69%	+0.08%
Constitution	Stacey Mathia Chris Levels	20,818	0.65%	+0.46%
Green	Harley Mikkelson Lynn Meadows	20,699	0.64%	+0.12%

=== 33rd District State Senator Republican Primary ===
33rd District State Senator - Republican Primary, 2010
Party	Candidate	Votes	%	±%
Republican	Brian N. Calley	16,881	56.8	
Republican	Michael Trebesh	12,848	43.2	

=== As State Representative ===
87th District State Representative, 2008
Party	Candidate	Votes	%	±%
Republican	Brian N. Calley (Incumbent)	29,583	64.1	7.8
Democratic	Greg Grieves	14,359	31.1	
Constitution	Phillip Peter Adams	1,267	2.7	
Libertarian	Joseph P. Gillotte	975	2.1	

87th District State Representative, 2006
Party	Candidate	Votes	%	±%
Republican	Brian N. Calley	21,527	56.3	
Democratic	Doug Kalnbach	15,504	40.6	
Constitution	Walt Herwarth	1,195	3.1	

87th District State Representative - Republican Primary, 2006
Party	Candidate	Votes	%	±
Republican	Brian N. Calley	4,346	43.11	
Republican	Jim Bailey	1,936	19.20	
Republican	Susan Vlietstra	1,455	14.43	
Republican	Brian Reynolds	1,392	13.81	
Republican	Mark Doster	408	4.05	
Republican	Tom Lower	406	4.03	
Republican	Wade Trombley	139	1.38	

Party political offices
Preceded by Ruth Johnson	Republican nominee for Lieutenant Governor of Michigan; 2010, 2014	Succeeded by Lisa Posthumus Lyons
Political offices
Preceded by John D. Cherry	Lieutenant Governor of Michigan; 2011–2019	Succeeded by Garlin Gilchrist
