= Julie Calley =

American politician

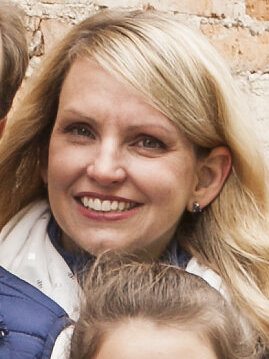
- Calley in 2017

Member of the Michigan House of Representatives from the 87th district
- In office January 1, 2017 – January 1, 2023
- Preceded by: Mike Callton
- Succeeded by: Will Snyder

Second Lady of Michigan
- In role January 1, 2011 – January 1, 2019
- Governor: Rick Snyder
- Preceded by: Pam Faris
- Succeeded by: Ellen Gilchrist

Personal details
- Born: Julie Powell
- Party: Republican
- Spouse: Brian Calley
- Children: 3
- Parents: Ronald H. Powell (father); Margie Powell (mother)
- Relatives: Stanley M. Powell (grandfather)
- Education: Northwood University
- Website: State Rep. Julie Calley

Julie Calley (née Powell) is an American politician and former Second Lady from Michigan. Calley was the Republican member of Michigan House of Representatives from District 87 from 2017 to 2023.

== Early life and education ==
Calley's father was Ronald H. Powell (1928-2012), a farmer. Calley's mother was Margie Powell. Calley's grandfather was Stanley M. Powell, a politician and farmer in Michigan. Calley's great-grandfather was Herbert Powell, a politician in Michigan. Calley grew up on a dairy farm in Michigan. At 16, Calley was diagnosed with eastern equine encephalitis (EEE). Calley graduated from Ionia High School.

Calley earned a bachelor's degree in Business Administration and Management from Northwood University in Midland, Michigan.

== Career ==
Calley worked in the real estate management industry. In 1998, Calley was an office manager of The Eyde Company until 2008. Calley was a member and chair person of the Ionia County Board of Commissioners. In 2015, Calley served as the chair person of Michigan Community Service Commission (MCSC).

On November 8, 2016, Calley won the election and became a Republican member of the Michigan House of Representatives for District 87. Calley defeated Eric Anderson and Joseph P. Gillotte with 67.08% of the votes. On November 6, 2018, as an incumbent, Calley won the election and continued serving District 87. Calley defeated Shawn Marie Winters with 67.56% of the votes. Calley is the chair person of Elections and Ethics Committee.

She did not run for re-election in the 2022 Michigan House of Representatives election.

== Personal life ==
Calley's husband is Brian Calley, a banker and former Lieutenant Governor of Michigan, who served in the House from the 87th District from 2007 through 2010. In 1997, Calley moved to Portland, Michigan. They have three children, son Collin and two daughters, Kara, who survived two open heart surgeries and Reagan, who is on the autism spectrum.

== Electoral history ==
2016 87th District Election
| Party | Candidate | Votes | % | ±% |
|---|---|---|---|---|
| Republican | Julie Calley | 30,957 | 67.1% | +1% |
| Democratic | Eric Anderson | 12,955 | 28.1% | −5.2% |
| Libertarian | Jay Gillotte | 2,238 | 4.9% | +4.9% |
| Majority | | 18,002 | 39% | +5.6 |
| Republican hold |

== See also ==
- 2016 Michigan House of Representatives election
- 2018 Michigan House of Representatives election
