= Jordan Lake (Michigan) =

Lake in the state of Michigan, United States

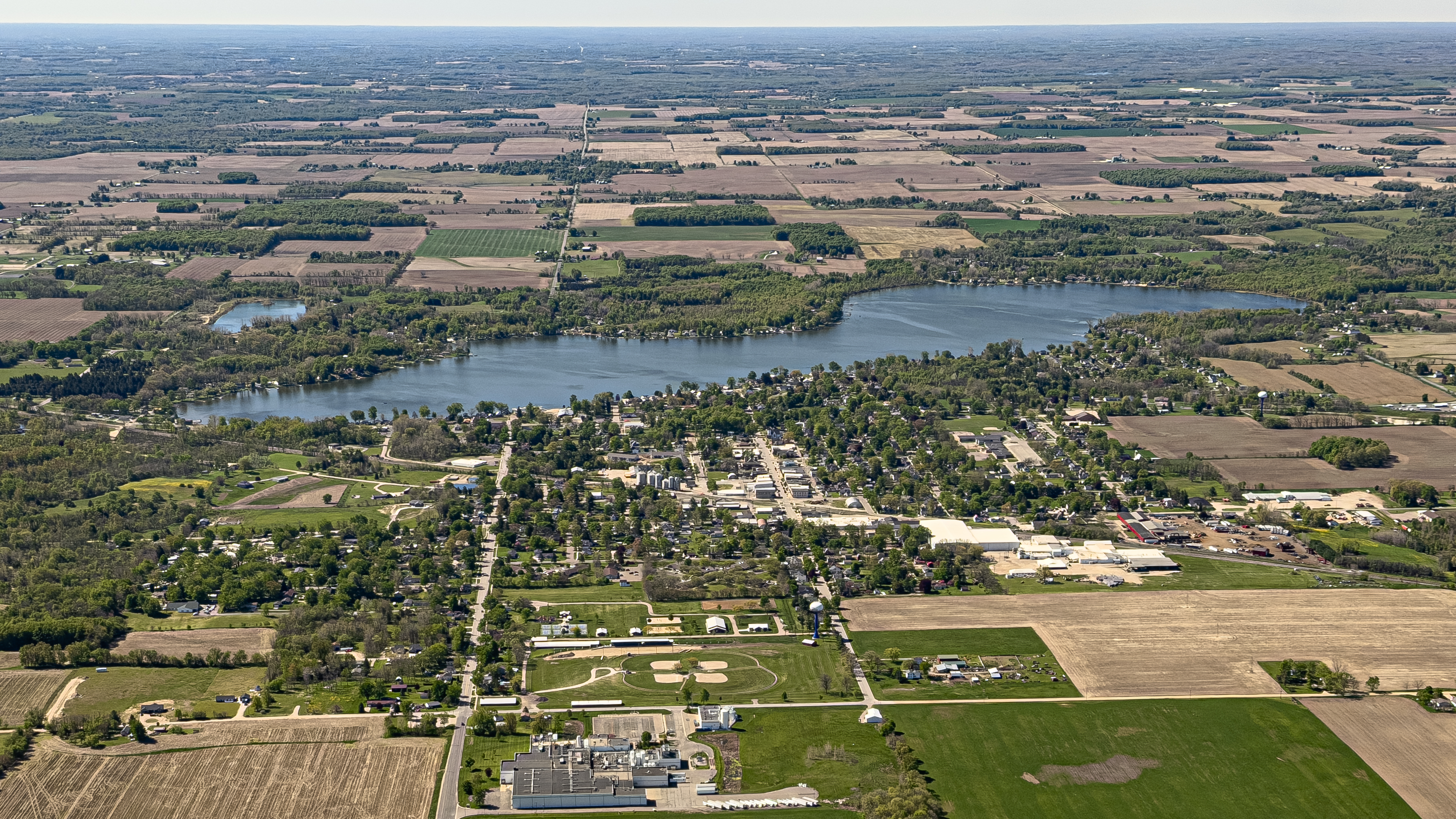
- Aerial image of Jordan Lake

- Location within Michigan
- Location: Barry County, Michigan
- Coordinates: 42.770345°N 85.140518°W
- Basin countries: United States
- Surface area: 430 acres (174 ha)
- Average depth: 58 ft (18 m)
- Surface elevation: 812 ft (247 m)

Jordan Lake is a 430-acre (174 ha), 58-foot (18 m) deep lake located in south-western Barry County, Michigan. The lake's inlet is Tupper Creek, and its outlet is the Little Thornapple River. It is situated directly south of Lakeview Drive in Lake Odessa, Michigan and located between the metropolitan areas of Grand Rapids and Lansing.

== History ==
Jordan Lake is a glacial lake that developed during the time of Lake Arkona in the Pleistocene period.

The lake area was first settled in 1838. As the village of Lake Odessa developed, a sewage facility was constructed near Jordan Lake. By 1947, a Michigan State University team, after being requested to investigate algal blooms in Jordan Lake, discovered that sewage had contaminated a third of the northeast portion of the lake and condemned the lake, preventing recreational use.

In the summer of 2000, residents expressed concern to local officials after packs of dead fish appeared in the lake after herbicides were applied to kill algae and invasive plants, with Michigan House representative Terry Geiger hosting a town hall regarding the incident.

On May 10, 2005, a group of three adults and one child fell from a tipped canoe into the cold waters of the lake. An off-duty prison guard used a personal water craft to rescue the child and two adults, though the child's father drowned.

== Recreation ==
The Lake Odessa Municipal Beach, a 2.7 acres (1.1 ha) beach located at 1440 Virginia Street, has a playground, grills, pavilion and public swimming area. A boat launch is located on the western shore of the lake.

== Ecology ==
In the spring, nutrients and organisms are introduced to Jordan Lake from a channel connected to the nearby Tupper Lake. Bidens connata, a flowering plant primarily found in wetland areas, are located in the surrounding parts of the lake. Eurasian water milfoil, an invasive aquatic weed, also has a presence in the lake.

Fish inhabiting Jordan Lake include:

- Bluegill
- Channel Catfish
- Crappie
- Largemouth bass
- Longear sunfish
- Northern Pike
- Smallmouth bass
- Yellow perch

== See also ==
- Gun Lake (Michigan)
