= Portland High School (Michigan) =

Location
- 1100 Ionia Road; Portland, Michigan 48875; United States
- Coordinates: 42°52′52″N 84°55′05″W

Information
- Type: Public
- School district: Portland Public Schools
- Superintendent: William Heath
- Principal: Matt Morales
- Teaching staff: 35.21 (on an FTE basis)
- Grades: 9-12
- Enrollment: 665 (2024-2025)
- Student to teacher ratio: 18.89
- Colors: Cardinal and white
- Athletics conference: CAAC
- Nickname: Raiders
- Yearbook: The Looking Glass
- Website: www.portlandk12.org/4/Home

Portland High School is a public secondary school in Portland, Michigan, United States. It serves grades 9-12 for the Portland Public Schools.

The school was originally founded in 1881. The current building used was built in 1991.

== Athletics ==
Portland’s fields teams in the following sports: baseball, basketball, cross country, football, soccer, track and field, wrestling, tennis, swimming, softball, and volleyball.

== Demographics ==
The demographic breakdown of the 671 students enrolled for the 2018–19 school year was:

- Male - 51.4%
- Female - 48.6%
- Asian - 0.4%
- Black - 0.3%
- Hispanic - 3.0%
- Native Hawaiian/Pacific islander - 0.1%
- White - 95.3%
- Multiracial - 0.9%

28.9% of the students were eligible for free or reduced-cost lunch. For 2018-19 Portland was a Title I school.
