= United States presidential eligibility legislation =

Requirements to be eligible for US president

The Constitution of the United States provides several basic requirements for eligibility to be elected to the office of President. Individual states did not introduce significant relevant legislation until the 2008 election of Barack Obama, when a controversy known as the birther movement was promoted by various conspiracy theorists. The "birthers" asserted during the 2008 presidential election campaign that Obama was not a natural-born U.S. citizen, as mandated by the Constitution, and thus was ineligible to be President of the United States, prompting several state legislatures to consider legislation aimed at requiring future presidential candidates to provide proof of citizenship by birth before being granted ballot access in their state. None of these efforts led to the passage of currently active laws.

== Background ==
Article II, Section 1, Clause 5 of the Constitution sets only three qualifications for holding the presidency. To serve as president, one must:

- be a natural-born United States citizen;
- be at least 35 years old;
- be a resident in the United States for at least 14 years.

A person who meets the above qualifications could still not be qualified to hold office if that person has exceeded the term limits of the 22nd amendment, or if they have been disqualified from holding any "office ... under the United States" — debatably a legal term which may or may not include the Presidency — via either impeachment and conviction under Article I, Section 3, Clause 7, or insurrection against the United States and disqualification under Section 3 of the Fourteenth Amendment.

== 2009 proposed federal legislation ==
In March 2009, Bill Posey introduced legislation, H.R. 1503, in the U.S. House of Representatives to amend the Federal Election Campaign Act of 1971. The amendment would have required candidates for the Presidency "to include with the [campaign] committee's statement of organization a copy of the candidate's birth certificate" plus other supporting documentation. Posey's bill never received a vote by the full House of Representatives, and died when the 111th Congress adjourned at the end of 2010.

== Proposed state presidential eligibility legislation 2008–2016 ==
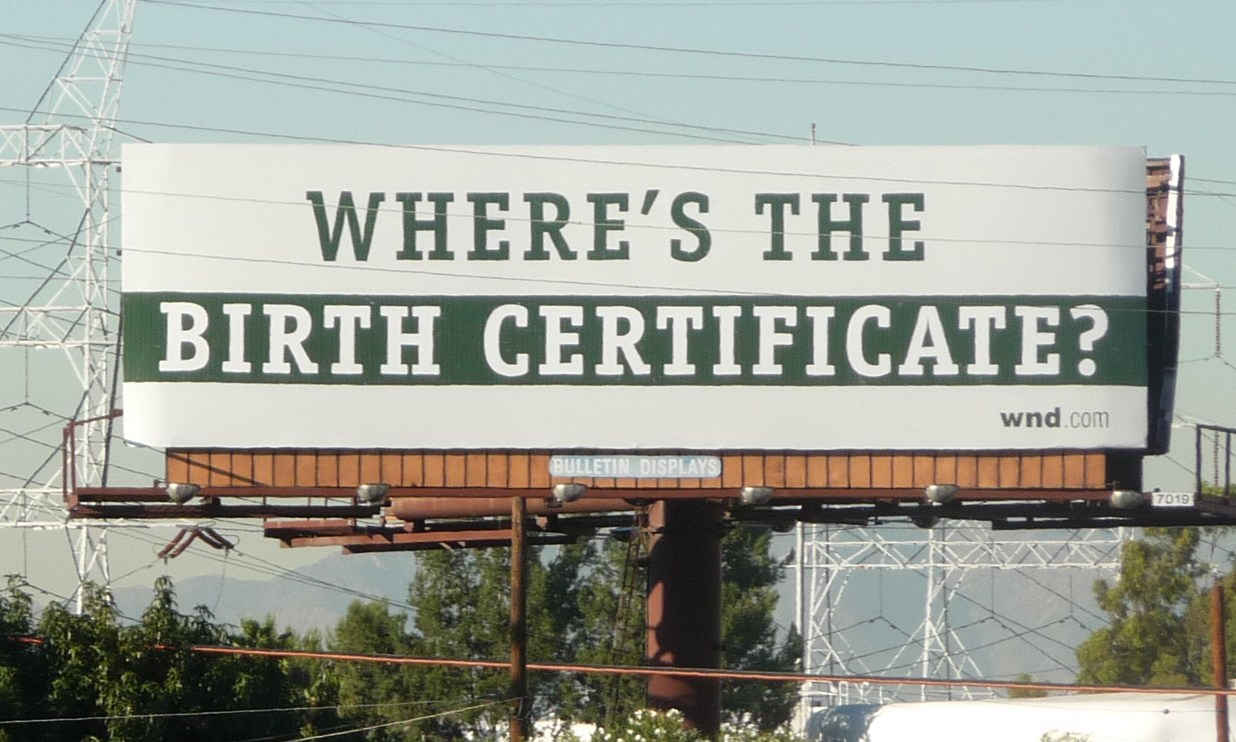
A 2010 billboard displayed in South Gate, California, questioning the validity of Barack Obama's birth certificate, and by extension his eligibility to serve as the nation's president

During the 2008 presidential election campaign, there was some controversy generated by conspiracy theorists who claimed that (eventual election winner) Obama was not a natural-born U.S. citizen, as mandated by the Constitution, and thus was ineligible to be President of the United States. This prompted several state legislatures to consider, in the aftermath of the election, legislation aimed at requiring future presidential candidates to show proof of presidential eligibility before being granted ballot access in their state.

=== Alabama ===
Legislation introduced in April 2011 by state Senator Slade Blackwell would require any candidate running for an office with an age requirement to present their birth certificate.

=== Arizona ===
On April 19, 2010, the Arizona House of Representatives voted in favor of a rider to require presidential candidates "to submit documents proving they meet the constitutional requirements to be president". If enacted, the law would give the Arizona Secretary of State the power to omit a candidate's name on the state ballot if there is "reasonable cause" to believe that the documents are not adequate proof of the requirements for office. The rider passed the Arizona House of Representatives on a 31–29 vote, with only Republicans voting in favor and some Republicans joining with Democrats to oppose. The bill then went to the Arizona State Senate, which declined to vote on the bill before the April 2010 end of legislative session, the deadline for the bill's passage.

In reaction to the proposed legislation, The Arizona Republic referred to it as a "nutty birther bill" that would make Arizona seem to be a place where "any crackpot whim can be enshrined in law". Arizona Republican State Representative Cecil Ash, who supported the bill, appeared on CNN's Anderson Cooper 360° to discuss the bill. Ash stated that he believed President Obama was an American citizen, but there has been "a lot of controversy over the issue". Cooper then likened the people who believe there is a birth certificate controversy to people who believe the moon is made of cheese and asked Ash if he knew the moon was not made of cheese without investigation. Ash responded in the affirmative.

In January 2011, similar legislation again was introduced in the Arizona House of Representatives. On April 14, 2011, the Arizona legislature passed a bill requiring presidential and vice presidential candidates to show the Arizona secretary of state proof that they are natural-born citizens. Such proof could be either a long-form birth certificate or at least two other forms of accepted proof, such as an early baptismal certificate, circumcision certificate or hospital birth record. On April 18, Governor Jan Brewer vetoed the bill.

A state legislator introduced a similar bill in 2012. In March 2012, a senate committee voted favorably on a bill that would require candidates for the presidency and vice presidency to submit an affidavit attesting to their eligibility to serve.

=== Colorado ===
Legislation introduced in April 2011 by 11 Republican state legislators would require any elected official to provide proof of citizenship before being sworn in. The bill was not voted out of committee.

=== Connecticut ===
In January 2011, Connecticut state Senator Michael A. McLachlan introduced legislation that would mandate presidential and vice presidential candidates to provide their birth certificates for their names to be placed on the ballot. The bill did not make it out of committee.

=== Georgia ===
In April 2010, Georgia state representative Mark Hatfield introduced legislation that would require presidential and vice presidential candidates to submit an affidavit "stating the candidate's citizenship and age and shall append to the affidavit documents that prove the candidate is a natural born citizen, prove the candidate's age, and prove that the candidate meets the residency requirements for President of the United States."

In February 2011, Hatfield again introduced similar legislation, but it was not voted out of committee.

=== Hawaii ===
In May 2010, Hawaii enacted a law allowing the state to ignore requests for information if deemed "duplicative or substantially similar" to a prior query.

In January 2011, Hawaii state representative Rida Cabanilla introduced HB 1116, allowing the Hawaii Department of Health to provide upon request a copy of the birth certificate of a "person of civic prominence", defined as a candidate or officeholder for which United States citizenship is required, and to charge the requesting party a surcharge of $100.

=== Indiana ===
In January 2011, Indiana state senator Mike Delph introduced legislation requiring presidential candidates to file a certified copy of a birth certificate along with additional documentation to be on the Indiana ballot. The legislation was not voted out of committee.

=== Iowa ===
In March 2011, Iowa state Senator Kent Sorenson introduced legislation that would require presidential or vice presidential candidates to submit certified copies of their birth certificates, which would be available for public inspection.

=== Kansas ===
In February 2012, a committee in the Kansas House of Representatives approved a bill that would require candidates for state and federal offices to provide proof of citizenship.

=== Louisiana ===
Legislation introduced in April 2011 by state Senator A.G. Crowe and state Representative Alan Seabaugh would require candidates for federal office to file a birth certificate. The legislation was not voted out of committee.

=== Maine ===
State representative Richard Cebra introduced legislation requiring candidates to submit a birth certificate and government-issued identification.

=== Michigan ===
Legislation introduced in April 2011 by state Representative Mike Callton would require presidential candidates to submit their birth certificates.

=== Missouri ===
==== Proposed constitutional amendment ====
Fifteen Republican members of the Missouri House of Representatives sponsored an amendment to the Missouri Constitution in March 2009 that would require "candidates who are required by the Constitution of the United States to be natural born citizens" to provide a birth certificate to the Missouri Secretary of State to confirm their eligibility. A "certificate of live birth" (the first unofficial document issued upon a baby's live birth) would not be accepted. Failure to comply would result in the candidate being deemed ineligible to stand. The only political offices to be affected would be the President and Vice President, which are the only two positions for which there is a specific constitutional citizenship requirement. The proposed amendment was part of a "voter's bill of rights", which would serve "as a defense against corruption, fraud, and tyranny". Political commentators interpreted the proposal as being "aimed at advancing the claims of the fringe movement that doubts President Barack Obama's eligibility to serve as president". The proposed amendment, House Joint Resolution No. 34, was subsequently withdrawn.

==== Legislation ====
In January 2011, Republican State Representative Lyle Rowland introduced legislation that would require "proof of identity and proof of United States citizenship" for all presidential and vice-presidential candidates." In May 2011, the requirement that presidential candidates present proof of natural born citizenship was added but later trimmed from an omnibus election law reform bill. Rowland introduced similar legislation in 2012. On March 29, 2012, the House of Representatives passed legislation that would require presidential or vice presidential candidates to prove their U.S. citizenship before appearing on the ballot. The bill then passed a Missouri senate committee.

==== Other ====
A number of Missouri Republican politicians have continued to support claims and litigation on the citizenship issue. State Representatives Cynthia L. Davis, Timothy W. Jones and Casey Guernsey have committed to participating as plaintiffs in a lawsuit filed in Missouri challenging Obama's citizenship. State Representative Edgar G. H. Emery told reporters in July 2009 that he "questions Obama's citizenship and ... believes his alleged lack of a legitimate birth certificate ignores the Constitution."

=== Montana ===
In January 2011, Montana state representative Bob Wagner introduced legislation requiring all candidates for federal office file affidavits with the Montana secretary of state verifying that they are qualified; presidential candidates would be required to provide the state with a valid copy of their birth certificates.

=== Nebraska ===
Proposed legislation introduced in January 2011 would have required a presidential or vice presidential candidate to provide proof of birth that includes the names of the candidate's parents, and proof that the parents were United States citizens at the time of the candidate's birth; the candidate would also have to swear of affirm, "I was born a citizen of the United States of America and was subject exclusively to the jurisdiction of the United States of America, owing allegiance to no other country at the time of my birth. On the day I was born, both my birth mother and birth father were citizens of the United States of America." The proposed legislation failed to be voted out of committee.

=== New Hampshire ===
Legislation introduced in March 2011 would have required presidential candidates to present their birth certificates when filing their nomination papers; the proposed enactment date was changed to 2013 and thus would not have affected the 2012 presidential elections. The proposed legislation was not voted out of committee.

Similar legislation proposed in 2012 also was not voted out of committee.

=== Oklahoma ===
Oklahoma Republican state Representative Mike Ritze proposed a bill in December 2008, requiring any candidate for public office in Oklahoma to show proof of citizenship. Ritze declared that he "does not believe Obama submitted an authentic copy of his birth certificate". He also unsuccessfully approached Oklahoma Republican Senators Tom Coburn and James Inhofe to persuade them to mount a challenge to Obama's confirmation by Congress. The bill, House Bill 1329, was criticized by The Norman Transcript newspaper as "an outright attempt to embarrass President Barack Obama whose own citizenship was questioned, mostly by those pajama guerrillas trolling on the Internet". The bill gained a 23–20 vote in favor, but failed to meet the 25-vote threshold required to pass.

In February 2011, similar legislation was reintroduced in the Oklahoma state senate.

=== Pennsylvania ===
Legislation introduced in April 2011 by state Representative Daryl Metcalfe would require candidates for president and vice president to provide proof of citizenship to qualify for a spot on the state ballot.

=== Tennessee ===
In Tennessee, four Republican state Representatives—Stacey Campfield, Glen Casada, Frank S. Niceley and Eric H. Swafford—announced in February 2009 that they would be joining a legal action to force Obama to release his birth certificate and prove his citizenship. Casada, the Tennessee House Republican caucus chairman, said that he believes Obama has further proof of eligibility, and would like him to make it available: "Yes, people may say, you're just chasing some conspiracy theory ... [but] it's a simple act on his part to just do, and we're done—move on." The alternative newspaper Nashville Scene described Swafford as joining a "wacky legal action" and quoted Tennessee house Democrat Larry Miller as saying: "What is the mentality of these kind of people who continuously make these kind of goofy statements? It's embarrassing." Attorney Orly Taitz of California said she planned to file the suit, representing the Defend Our Freedoms Foundation.

Legislation proposed in January 2011 would require anyone running for elected office to furnish a birth certificate before being declared an eligible candidate." It failed to be voted out of a subcommittee.

In January 2016, two Democratic legislators proposed barring the Secretary of State from placing on the ballot any presidential or vice-presidential candidate who was not a natural-born citizen.

=== Texas ===
On November 16, 2010, Texas state representative Leo Berman introduced legislation requiring any candidate for president or vice president running in Texas to submit to the Texas Secretary of State an "original birth certificate indicating that the person is a natural-born United States citizen." In introducing the bill, Berman said that the "bill is necessary because we have a president whom the American people don't know whether he was born in Kenya or some other place." His bill would have therefore specifically disallowed the use of the reproduced certificate that Obama used after June 2008 as evidence of birthplace; reproduced certificates are generally accepted by government agencies as proof of birth.

== Proposed state presidential eligibility legislation 2017–2020 ==
Prior to the 2020 presidential election, in at least 18 U.S. states, bills were introduced that would require as a condition for ballot access release of the individual tax returns of presidential candidates.

=== California ===
On September 14, 2017, a bill was passed in California to require primary election presidential candidates to release their tax returns in order to appear on the ballot in California. On October 15, it was vetoed by Governor Jerry Brown.

In July 2019, a similar bill, California Senate Bill 27 (2019), also known as the Presidential Tax Transparency and Accountability Act, was passed. On July 30, 2019, Governor Gavin Newsom signed it into law.

The law's requirements for presidential candidates were invalidated by the courts.

=== Maryland ===
On 5 March 2018, the state senate of Maryland passed a bill to require presidential candidates to release tax returns.

=== New Jersey ===
In March 2017, the state legislature of New Jersey passed a bill to require presidential candidates to release tax returns. It was vetoed by Governor Chris Christie.

== 2022 proposed federal legislation ==
On December 15, 2022, David Cicilline and 39 other House Democrats introduced a bill to bar Donald Trump from future office via evidence of his having engaged in insurrection.

== Proposed state presidential eligibility legislation post-2020 ==
=== Arizona ===
In January 2024, Arizona state senator Janae Shamp introduced a bill that would prevent a candidate from being removed from the ballot via Section 3 of the Fourteenth Amendment absent criminal conviction for insurrection.

In February 2024, Arizona state representative Cory McGarr introduced a bill to ensure that if the Republican presidential nominee were to be excluded from the ballot the Democratic presidential nominee would also be excluded (and vice versa).

=== California ===
In January 2024, California state senator Dave Min filed a bill that would empower the Secretary of State of that state to remove from the presidential ballot candidates ineligible under section 3 of the 14th amendment.

=== Hawaii ===
In January 2024, Honolulu state senator Karl Rhoads introduced a bill stipulating exclusion from the ballot of anyone disqualified under section 3 of the 14th amendment of the U.S. constitution, and prohibiting presidential electors from voting for any such person.

=== Iowa ===
In January 2024, Iowa Secretary of State Paul Pate filed a bill limiting challenges to eligibility for presidential general election ballot access to grounds other than section 3 of the 14th amendment.

=== Missouri ===
In January 2024, Missouri state senator Bill Eigel introduced a bill that would disqualify from the presidential ballot anyone named by the governor as being "associated with" an invasion of illegal immigrants that the governor had declared the state to be subject to.
