= Freeport, Michigan =

- Village
- Location of Freeport, Michigan
- Coordinates: 42°45′56″N 85°18′48″W
- Country: United States
- State: Michigan
- County: Barry

Area
  - Total: 0.80 sq mi (2.06 km^{2})
  - Land: 0.79 sq mi (2.05 km^{2})
  - Water: 0.0039 sq mi (0.01 km^{2})
- Elevation: 790 ft (240 m)

Population (2020)
  - Total: 542
  - Density: 686.0/sq mi (264.86/km^{2})
- Time zone: UTC-5 (Eastern (EST))
  - Summer (DST): UTC-4 (EDT)
- ZIP code: 49325
- Area code: 616
- FIPS code: 26-30580
- GNIS feature ID: 0626464
- Website: https://freeportmichigan.org/

Freeport is a village in Barry County in the U.S. state of Michigan. The population was 542 at the 2020 census. The village is mostly within Irving Township, though a small portion lies in Carlton Township.

== Geography ==
According to the United States Census Bureau, the village has a total area of 0.79 square miles (2.05 km^{2}), of which 0.78 square miles (2.02 km^{2}) is land and 0.01 square miles (0.03 km^{2}) is water.

== Demographics ==
Historical population
Census	Pop.	Note	%±
1880	166		—
1910	460		—
1920	398		−13.5%
1930	388		−2.5%
1940	405		4.4%
1950	452		11.6%
1960	495		9.5%
1970	501		1.2%
1980	479		−4.4%
1990	458		−4.4%
2000	444		−3.1%
2010	483		8.8%
2020	542		12.2%
U.S. Decennial Census

=== 2010 census ===
As of the census of 2010, there were 483 people, 177 households, and 124 families residing in the village. The population density was 619.2 inhabitants per square mile (239.1/km^{2}). There were 200 housing units at an average density of 256.4 per square mile (99.0/km^{2}). The racial makeup of the village was 97.1% White, 1.0% African American, 0.2% Asian, 0.4% from other races, and 1.2% from two or more races. Hispanic or Latino of any race were 3.3% of the population.

There were 177 households, of which 36.7% had children under the age of 18 living with them, 52.5% were married couples living together, 11.9% had a female householder with no husband present, 5.6% had a male householder with no wife present, and 29.9% were non-families. 19.2% of all households were made up of individuals, and 6.8% had someone living alone who was 65 years of age or older. The average household size was 2.73 and the average family size was 3.19.

The median age in the village was 36.3 years. 27.1% of residents were under the age of 18; 9.4% were between the ages of 18 and 24; 25.2% were from 25 to 44; 29.1% were from 45 to 64; and 9.1% were 65 years of age or older. The gender makeup of the village was 49.9% male and 50.1% female.

=== 2000 census ===
As of the census of 2000, there were 444 people, 161 households, and 122 families residing in the village. The population density was 575.8 inhabitants per square mile (222.3/km^{2}). There were 167 housing units at an average density of 216.6 per square mile (83.6/km^{2}). The racial makeup of the village was 92.57% White, 2.03% African American, 0.45% Asian, 1.80% from other races, and 3.15% from two or more races. Hispanic or Latino of any race were 0.45% of the population.

There were 161 households, out of which 38.5% had children under the age of 18 living with them, 57.1% were married couples living together, 12.4% had a female householder with no husband present, and 24.2% were non-families. 17.4% of all households were made up of individuals, and 4.3% had someone living alone who was 65 years of age or older. The average household size was 2.76 and the average family size was 3.08.

In the village, the population was spread out, with 27.9% under the age of 18, 8.8% from 18 to 24, 34.7% from 25 to 44, 19.4% from 45 to 64, and 9.2% who were 65 years of age or older. The median age was 34 years. For every 100 females, there were 98.2 males. For every 100 females age 18 and over, there were 96.3 males.

The median income for a household in the village was $42,708, and the median income for a family was $46,667. Males had a median income of $35,000 versus $25,156 for females. The per capita income for the village was $18,684. About 0.8% of families and 0.7% of the population were below the poverty line, including 2.1% of those under age 18 and none of those age 65 or over.

== Notable people ==
- Allen Steckle – early 20th century college football coach
- Jack Van Impe – televangelist was born in Freeport in 1931
