= Jordan Lake (Guysborough) =

Lake in Nova Scotia, Canada

- Location within Nova Scotia
- Location: Guysborough District, Nova Scotia
- Coordinates: 45.198309°N 62.417253°W
- Basin countries: Canada

Jordan Lake is a lake of Guysborough District, in Nova Scotia, Canada.

== See also ==
- List of lakes in Nova Scotia
