= Jordan Lake (Nova Scotia) =

Lake in Nova Scotia, Canada

Jordan Lake, Nova Scotia
- Location within Nova Scotia
- Location: Shelburne District / Region of Queens Municipality, Nova Scotia
- Coordinates: 44°04′46″N 65°14′15″W
- Basin countries: Canada

Jordan Lake is a lake that is located mostly in Shelburne District, in Nova Scotia, Canada. Its northeastern portion crosses into Region of Queens Municipality. The lake lies southwest of the much larger Lake Rossignol.

== See also ==
- List of lakes in Nova Scotia
