= Clarksville, Michigan =

- Village
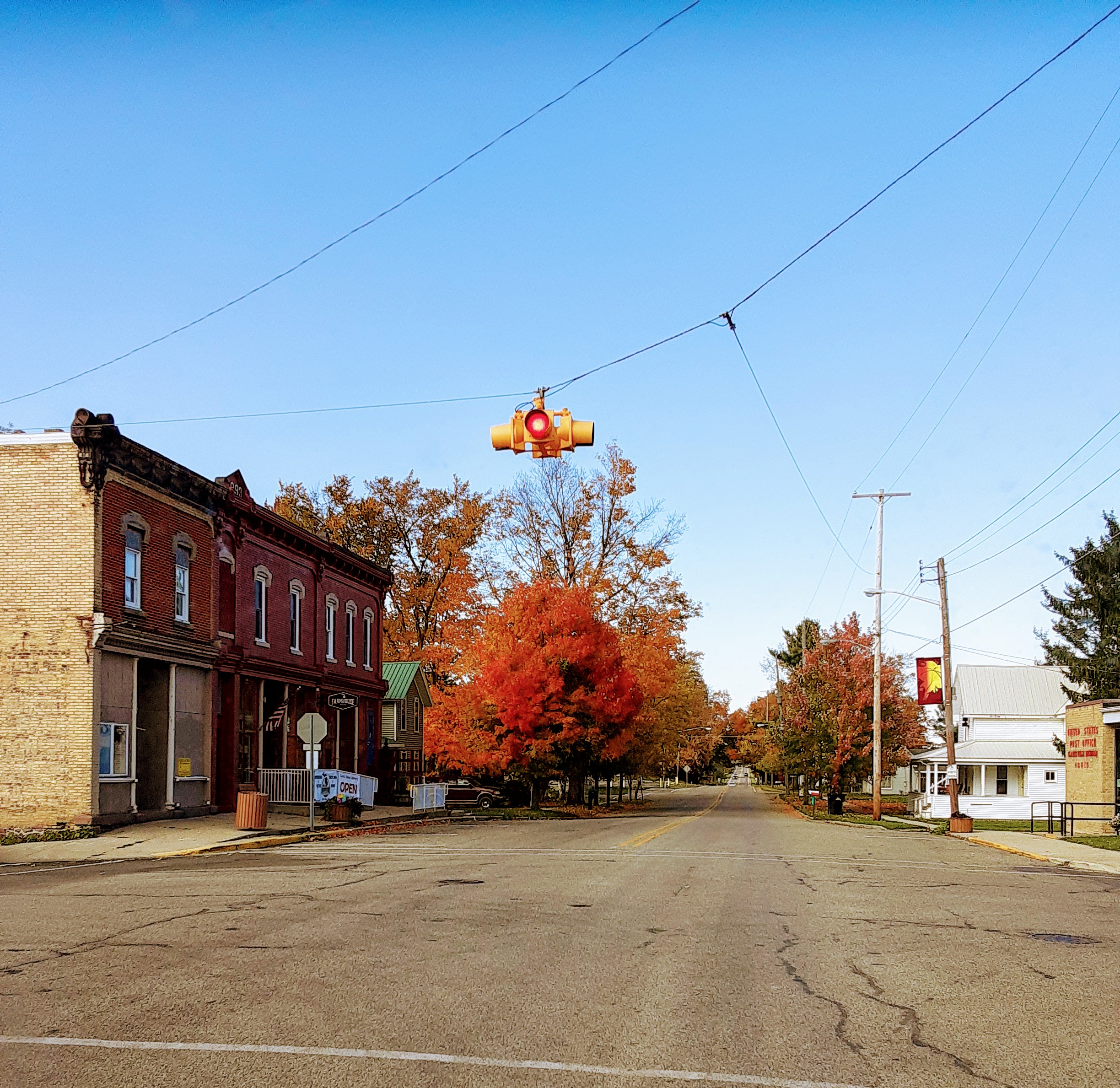

- Location of Clarksville, Michigan
- Coordinates: 42°50′32″N 85°14′33″W
- Country: United States
- State: Michigan
- County: Ionia

Area
  - Total: 0.51 sq mi (1.31 km^{2})
  - Land: 0.51 sq mi (1.31 km^{2})
  - Water: 0 sq mi (0.00 km^{2})
- Elevation: 824 ft (251 m)

Population (2020)
  - Total: 411
  - Density: 815.3/sq mi (314.78/km^{2})
- Time zone: UTC-5 (Eastern (EST))
  - Summer (DST): UTC-4 (EDT)
- ZIP code: 48815
- Area code: 616
- FIPS code: 26-16140
- GNIS feature ID: 2397634
- Website: www.clarksvillemi.org

Clarksville is a village in Ionia County in the U.S. state of Michigan. As of the 2020 census, Clarksville had a population of 411. The village is within Campbell Township. The Clarksville ZIP code 48815 serves the northern portion of the township as well the southern portion of Boston Township and small portions of Odessa Township on the east and Bowne Township in Kent County on the west. The biggest thing to happen in Clarksville since 1992 is the opening of a Dollar General store in 2020.

== Geography ==
According to the United States Census Bureau, the village has a total area of 0.50 square miles (1.29 km^{2}), all land.

== Demographics ==
Historical population
Census	Pop.	Note	%±
1930	284		—
1940	309		8.8%
1950	339		9.7%
1960	371		9.4%
1970	346		−6.7%
1980	348		0.6%
1990	360		3.4%
2000	317		−11.9%
2010	394		24.3%
2020	411		4.3%
U.S. Decennial Census

=== 2010 census ===
As of the census of 2010, there were 394 people, 164 households, and 102 families residing in the village. The population density was 788.0 inhabitants per square mile (304.2/km^{2}). There were 182 housing units at an average density of 364.0 per square mile (140.5/km^{2}). The racial makeup of the village was 94.7% White, 0.5% African American, 0.3% Native American, 2.0% Asian, 0.3% from other races, and 2.3% from two or more races. Hispanic or Latino of any race were 2.8% of the population.

There were 164 households, of which 36.6% had children under the age of 18 living with them, 48.8% were married couples living together, 7.3% had a female householder with no husband present, 6.1% had a male householder with no wife present, and 37.8% were non-families. 31.7% of all households were made up of individuals, and 20.7% had someone living alone who was 65 years of age or older. The average household size was 2.40 and the average family size was 3.01.

The median age in the village was 32.4 years. 25.4% of residents were under the age of 18; 7.8% were between the ages of 18 and 24; 30.7% were from 25 to 44; 20.6% were from 45 to 64; and 15.5% were 65 years of age or older. The gender makeup of the village was 53.6% male and 46.4% female.
