= Carlton Township, Michigan =

- Township
- Location within the state of Michigan
- Coordinates: 42°44′11″N 85°15′17″W
- Country: United States
- State: Michigan
- County: Barry

Area
  - Total: 35.7 sq mi (92.4 km^{2})
  - Land: 35.1 sq mi (91.0 km^{2})
  - Water: 0.54 sq mi (1.4 km^{2})
- Elevation: 797 ft (243 m)

Population (2020)
  - Total: 2,368
  - Density: 68/sq mi (26.3/km^{2})
- Time zone: UTC-5 (Eastern (EST))
  - Summer (DST): UTC-4 (EDT)
- FIPS code: 26-13340
- GNIS feature ID: 1626031
- Website: https://www.carltontownship.org/

Carlton Township is a civil township of Barry County in the U.S. state of Michigan. The population was 2,368 at the 2020 census.

== History ==
The name of Carlton Township was given it by George Fuller and his family, the first settlers here in 1836. It was organized as a township in 1842.

== Communities ==
Gerkey was an unincorporated location in Carlton Township. It had a post office from 1884 until 1902. The village of Freeport is within the boundaries of Carlton. Freeport also possesses a library. The township is serviced by the fire departments of Woodland as well.

== Geography ==
According to the United States Census Bureau, the township has a total area of 35.7 square miles (92.4 km^{2}), of which 35.1 square miles (91.0 km^{2}) is land and 0.54 square miles (1.4 km^{2}), or 1.55%, is water.

== Demographics ==
As of the census of 2020, there were 2,368 people and 993 households in the township. The population density was 66.3 inhabitants per square mile (25.6/km^{2}). There were 994 housing units. The median income for a household in the township is $66,680.

As of the census for 2010 United States census, The racial makeup of the township was 97.25% White, 0.26% African American, 0.73% Native American, 0.09% Asian, 0.64% from other races, and 1.03% from two or more races. Hispanic or Latino of any race were 1.72% of the population. There were 836 households, out of which 38.5% had children under the age of 18 living with them, 66.5% were married couples living together, 8.3% had a female householder with no husband present, and 21.3% were non-families. 16.9% of all households were made up of individuals, and 6.8% had someone living alone who was 65 years of age or older. The average household size was 2.79 and the average family size was 3.12. In the township the population was spread out, with 29.0% under the age of 18, 7.6% from 18 to 24, 28.1% from 25 to 44, 24.1% from 45 to 64, and 11.2% who were 65 years of age or older. The median age was 36 years. For every 100 females, there were 99.9 males. For every 100 females age 18 and over, there were 101.2 males.
