= Woodland Township, Michigan =

- Township
- Location within the state of Michigan
- Coordinates: 42°43′50″N 85°7′46″W
- Country: United States
- State: Michigan
- County: Barry

Area
  - Total: 35.9 sq mi (93.1 km^{2})
  - Land: 35.4 sq mi (91.6 km^{2})
  - Water: 0.58 sq mi (1.5 km^{2})
- Elevation: 869 ft (265 m)

Population (2020)
  - Total: 1,994
  - Density: 56.4/sq mi (21.8/km^{2})
- Time zone: UTC-5 (Eastern (EST))
  - Summer (DST): UTC-4 (EDT)
- ZIP code: 48897
- Area code: 269
- FIPS code: 26-88440
- GNIS feature ID: 1627289

Woodland Township is a civil township of Barry County in the U.S. state of Michigan. The population was 1,994 at the 2020 census. The village of Woodland is located within the township.

== Geography ==
According to the United States Census Bureau, the township has a total area of 35.9 square miles (93.1 km^{2}), of which 35.4 square miles (91.6 km^{2}) is land and 0.58 square miles (1.5 km^{2}), or 1.56%, is water.

== Demographics ==
As of the census of 2000, there were 2,129 people, 808 households, and 596 families residing in the township. The population density was 60.1 inhabitants per square mile (23.2/km^{2}). There were 878 housing units at an average density of 24.8 units per square mile (9.6 units/km^{2}). The racial makeup of the township was 97.56% White, 0.09% African American, 0.38% Native American, 0.33% Asian, 0.80% from other races, and 0.85% from two or more races. Hispanic or Latino of any race were 2.63% of the population.

There were 808 households, out of which 34.0% had children under the age of 18 living with them, 64.7% were married couples living together, 6.1% had a female householder with no husband present, and 26.2% were non-families. 21.9% of all households were made up of individuals, and 10.3% had someone living alone who was 65 years of age or older. The average household size was 2.63 and the average family size was 3.11.

In the township the population was spread out, with 27.4% under the age of 18, 7.2% from 18 to 24, 28.8% from 25 to 44, 24.2% from 45 to 64, and 12.3% who were 65 years of age or older. The median age was 37 years. For every 100 females, there were 105.3 males. For every 100 females age 18 and over, there were 105.7 males.

The median income for a household in the township was $38,920, and the median income for a family was $50,625. Males had a median income of $37,188 versus $23,750 for females. The per capita income for the township was $19,787. About 4.4% of families and 6.6% of the population were below the poverty line, including 5.7% of those under age 18 and 8.3% of those age 65 or over.
