= Orange Township, Ionia County, Michigan =

Orange Township, Michigan
- Township
- Location within Michigan Location within the United States
- Coordinates: 42°54′7″N 85°1′19″W
- Country: United States
- State: Michigan
- County: Ionia

Area
  - Total: 36.0 sq mi (93.3 km^{2})
  - Land: 36.0 sq mi (93.3 km^{2})
  - Water: 0.039 sq mi (0.1 km^{2})
- Elevation: 797 ft (243 m)

Population (2020)
  - Total: 1,012
  - Density: 28.1/sq mi (10.8/km^{2})
- Time zone: UTC-5 (Eastern (EST))
  - Summer (DST): UTC-4 (EDT)
- FIPS code: 26-60920
- GNIS feature ID: 1626853
- Website: https://orangetownshipioniami.gov/

Orange Township is a civil township of Ionia County in the U.S. state of Michigan. The population was 1,012 at the 2020 census.

== Communities ==
- Hackett's Settlement An unincorporated community in the southeast corner of the township founded in 1837. Most of the early settlers were Irish Catholics.

According to the United States Census Bureau, the township has a total area of 36.0 square miles (93.3 km^{2}), of which 36.0 square miles (93.2 km^{2}) is land and 0.04 square mile (0.1 km^{2}) (0.08%) is water.

== Demographics ==
As of the census of 2000, there were 1,040 people, 375 households, and 294 families residing in the township. The population density was 28.9 inhabitants per square mile (11.2/km^{2}). There were 407 housing units at an average density of 11.3 per square mile (4.4/km^{2}). The racial makeup of the township was 97.69% White, 0.29% Native American, 0.77% from other races, and 1.25% from two or more races. Hispanic or Latino of any race were 1.06% of the population.

There were 375 households, out of which 37.1% had children under the age of 18 living with them, 67.5% were married couples living together, 5.6% had a female householder with no husband present, and 21.6% were non-families. 18.1% of all households were made up of individuals, and 7.5% had someone living alone who was 65 years of age or older. The average household size was 2.77 and the average family size was 3.18.

In the township the population was spread out, with 27.5% under the age of 18, 7.7% from 18 to 24, 29.0% from 25 to 44, 25.5% from 45 to 64, and 10.3% who were 65 years of age or older. The median age was 36 years. For every 100 females, there were 104.3 males. For every 100 females age 18 and over, there were 107.1 males.

The median income for a household in the township was $50,217, and the median income for a family was $52,375. Males had a median income of $33,750 versus $22,222 for females. The per capita income for the township was $18,188. About 4.4% of families and 6.2% of the population were below the poverty line, including 9.2% of those under age 18 and 5.9% of those age 65 or over.
