= Danby Township, Michigan =

- Township
- Location within Michigan Location within the United States
- Coordinates: 42°48′16″N 84°53′8″W
- Country: United States
- State: Michigan
- County: Ionia

Area
  - Total: 36.1 sq mi (93.5 km^{2})
  - Land: 35.3 sq mi (91.5 km^{2})
  - Water: 0.81 sq mi (2.1 km^{2})
- Elevation: 748 ft (228 m)

Population (2020)
  - Total: 2,953
  - Density: 83.6/sq mi (32.3/km^{2})
- Time zone: UTC-5 (Eastern (EST))
  - Summer (DST): UTC-4 (EDT)
- FIPS code: 26-19720
- GNIS feature ID: 1626158
- Website: https://www.danbytownship.org/

Danby Township is a civil township of Ionia County in the U.S. state of Michigan. The population was 2,953 at the 2020 census.

== Geography ==
According to the United States Census Bureau, the township has a total area of 36.1 square miles (93 km^{2}), of which 35.3 square miles (91 km^{2}) is land and 0.8 square miles (2.1 km^{2}) (2.22%) is water.

== History ==
Danby Township was established in 1845.

== Demographics ==
As of the census of 2000, there were 2,696 people, 914 households, and 762 families residing in the township. The population density was 76.4 inhabitants per square mile (29.5/km^{2}). There were 938 housing units at an average density of 26.6 per square mile (10.3/km^{2}). The racial makeup of the township was 97.89% White, 0.22% African American, 0.37% Native American, 0.33% Asian, 0.19% from other races, and 1.00% from two or more races. Hispanic or Latino of any race were 0.82% of the population.

There were 914 households, out of which 41.7% had children under the age of 18 living with them, 74.0% were married couples living together, 6.1% had a female householder with no husband present, and 16.6% were non-families. 13.5% of all households were made up of individuals, and 4.0% had someone living alone who was 65 years of age or older. The average household size was 2.94 and the average family size was 3.23.

In the township the population was spread out, with 29.4% under the age of 18, 7.9% from 18 to 24, 30.3% from 25 to 44, 23.7% from 45 to 64, and 8.6% who were 65 years of age or older. The median age was 36 years. For every 100 females, there were 99.7 males. For every 100 females age 18 and over, there were 104.4 males.

The median income for a household in the township was $55,662, and the median income for a family was $58,750. Males had a median income of $42,895 versus $28,255 for females. The per capita income for the township was $21,574. About 0.4% of families and 0.9% of the population were below the poverty line, including none of those under age 18 and 1.1% of those age 65 or over.
