= Sebewa Township, Michigan =

- Township
- Location within Michigan Location within the United States
- Coordinates: 42°49′10″N 85°0′39″W
- Country: United States
- State: Michigan
- County: Ionia

Area
  - Total: 35.8 sq mi (92.8 km^{2})
  - Land: 35.8 sq mi (92.8 km^{2})
  - Water: 0 sq mi (0.0 km^{2})
- Elevation: 830 ft (253 m)

Population (2020)
  - Total: 1,124
  - Density: 31.4/sq mi (12.1/km^{2})
- Time zone: UTC-5 (Eastern (EST))
  - Summer (DST): UTC-4 (EDT)
- FIPS code: 26-72120
- GNIS feature ID: 1627054

Sebewa Township is a civil township of Ionia County in the U.S. state of Michigan. As of the 2010 census, the township population was 1,171 and decreased to 1,124 at the 2020 census.

== Communities ==
- Sebewa (or Sebewa Corners) is an unincorporated community at 42°47′58″N 84°57′21″W straddling the boundary between Sebewa Township on the west and Danby Township on the east. On April 11, 1867, Pierce G. Cook, as an agent for Elizabeth Cornell of New Jersey, platted the portion of community in Danby with the name Cornell. Other plats were made on the Sebewa side and over time, the name reverted to Sebewa for the entire settlement.

== History ==
=== Early settlers ===
The first permanent white settlers in the township were John F. Terrill, Charles W. Ingalls, and John Brown from Vermont, who arrived in 1838. An earlier settler by the name of Jones had arrived in 1836 with his wife, but did not remain in the area. Terrill located on section 25 and Ingall and Brown in section 36. In 1843, Terrill, along with Anson W. Halbert, built a sawmill on the Sebewa Creek, just west of "The Corners" located where the corners of four sections met along the eastern township line. Halbert had arrived in 1841 and married one of Terrill's daughters and carried out some trade at the Corners.

Jacob Showerman had been to the area in 1836 looking for land and found only Jones in section 1. Showerman entered a claim for 160 acres (0.65 km^{2}) of land in section 22 and returned in 1839 with Eleazer Brown and their families. They lodged in the small one-room cabin of Terrill's along with Terrill's and that of William Hogle and his son-in-law John Brown. The twenty people in the four families passed four weeks together until a path to Showerman's property could be cut. Eleazer Brown settled on land he bought in section 26.

Rufus Goddard, who had moved west from Livingston County, New York, came to the area in 1837 and located land in Sebewa while his family remained in Lenawee County. Goddard, along with Benjamin D. Weld, who was to give some assistance to Goddard, were to come together to Sebewa. However, Weld was not ready to move and both families remained in Lenawee. Weld moved to Sebewa in 1843 and settled in the southwestern part of Sebewa. Goddard followed in 1844 and worked a year and a half to repay Weld before settling on 80 acres (320,000 m^{2}) in section 32.

=== Township organization ===
Sebewa Township was a part of Berlin Township until March 19, 1845, when it was created as a separate township. The first names proposed were "Charlestown", in honor of Charles W. Ingalls; and "Liberia", but Rufus Goddard suggested Sebewa, after Sebewa Creek, meaning little river. The first township meeting was held at the home of Jacob Showerman, but no record of the meeting attendees or acts remains.

=== Post offices ===
A post office named "Sebewa" was established on January 24, 1851, with Benjamin Weld as the first postmaster. On April 14, 1854, the post office was moved from Weld's properties in the southwest part of the township to the Showerman settlement when Lucius Showerman was named postmaster. In 1857, the office moved to "The Corners". The name was changed to "Cornell" on July 8, 1861, but was changed back to Sebewa on February 16, 1881. The office was closed on November 15, 1913.

== Geography ==
According to the United States Census Bureau, the township has a total area of 35.8 square miles (93 km^{2}), of which 35.8 square miles (93 km^{2}) is land and 0.03% is water.

== Demographics ==
As of the census of 2000, there were 1,202 people, 406 households, and 332 families residing in the township. The population density was 33.6 inhabitants per square mile (13.0/km^{2}). There were 415 housing units at an average density of 11.6 per square mile (4.5/km^{2}). The racial makeup of the township was 98.34% White, 0.25% Native American, 0.08% Asian, 0.25% from other races, and 1.08% from two or more races. Hispanic or Latino of any race were 0.92% of the population.

There were 406 households, out of which 40.4% had children under the age of 18 living with them, 73.2% were married couples living together, 5.4% had a female householder with no husband present, and 18.2% were non-families. 15.3% of all households were made up of individuals, and 5.9% had someone living alone who was 65 years of age or older. The average household size was 2.96 and the average family size was 3.30.

In the township the population was spread out, with 29.9% under the age of 18, 8.3% from 18 to 24, 31.3% from 25 to 44, 20.1% from 45 to 64, and 10.4% who were 65 years of age or older. The median age was 34 years. For every 100 females, there were 101.0 males. For every 100 females age 18 and over, there were 103.1 males.

The median income for a household in the township was $47,065, and the median income for a family was $52,125. Males had a median income of $36,719 versus $24,091 for females. The per capita income for the township was $17,774. About 5.1% of families and 6.1% of the population were below the poverty line, including 7.2% of those under age 18 and 3.9% of those age 65 or over.

== Notes and references ==
- Branch, Elam E. (2005) [1916]. History of Ionia County, Michigan : her people, industries and institutions, with biographical sketches of representative citizens, and genealogical records of many of the old families. Ann Arbor, Mich.: University of Michigan Library.
