= Woodland, Michigan =

- Village
- Location of Woodland, Michigan
- Coordinates: 42°43′39″N 85°7′59″W
- Country: United States
- State: Michigan
- County: Barry

Area
  - Total: 0.85 sq mi (2.20 km^{2})
  - Land: 0.85 sq mi (2.20 km^{2})
  - Water: 0 sq mi (0.00 km^{2})
- Elevation: 869 ft (265 m)

Population (2020)
  - Total: 391
  - Density: 461.1/sq mi (178.03/km^{2})
- Time zone: UTC-5 (Eastern (EST))
  - Summer (DST): UTC-4 (EDT)
- ZIP Code: 48897
- Area code: 269
- FIPS code: 26-88420
- GNIS feature ID: 1616751

Woodland is a village in Barry County, Michigan, United States. The population was 391 at the 2020 census. The village is located within Woodland Township.

== Geography ==
According to the United States Census Bureau, the village has a total area of 0.85 square miles (2.20 km^{2}), all of which is land.

Woodland is located in the northeastern corner of Barry County. It is a small agricultural town that also serves as a bedroom community for the Lansing and Grand Rapids areas. The village has its own local government and an elementary school.

Woodland was first settled in 1837 by Charles and Jonathan Galloway, along with Charles Haight. Both the village and the township were named after the dense forests in the area. The arrival of the Chicago, Kalamazoo and Saginaw Railway in 1889 spurred growth, leading to its incorporation as a village in 1892.

== Demographics ==
Historical population
Census	Pop.	Note	%±
1880	266		—
1900	319		—
1910	304		−4.7%
1920	356		17.1%
1930	407		14.3%
1940	402		−1.2%
1950	410		2.0%
1960	374		−8.8%
1970	473		26.5%
1980	431		−8.9%
1990	466		8.1%
2000	495		6.2%
2010	425		−14.1%
2020	391		−8.0%
U.S. Decennial Census

=== 2010 census ===
As of the 2010 census, there were 425 people, 162 households, and 116 families living in the village. The population density was 518.3 inhabitants per square mile (200.1/km^{2}). There were 180 housing units at an average density of 219.5 per square mile (84.7/km^{2}).

The racial makeup of the village was 96.9% White, 0.2% African American, 0.2% Asian, 1.9% from other races, and 0.7% from two or more races. Hispanic or Latino of any race made up 3.8% of the population.

There were 162 households, of which 38.3% had children under the age of 18 living with them, 49.4% were married couples living together, 16.0% had a female householder with no husband present, 6.2% had a male householder with no wife present, and 28.4% were non-families. Additionally, 25.3% of all households were made up of individuals, and 9.9% had someone living alone who was 65 years of age or older. The average household size was 2.62, and the average family size was 3.03.

The median age in the village was 35.5 years. Of the total population, 27.1% were under the age of 18, 9.8% were between 18 and 24, 27.6% were between 25 and 44, 22.9% were between 45 and 64, and 12.7% were 65 years of age or older. The gender makeup of the village was 51.1% male and 48.9% female.

=== 2000 census ===
As of the 2000 census, there were 495 people, 180 households, and 133 families living in the village. The population density was 620.4 inhabitants per square mile (239.5/km^{2}). There were 184 housing units at an average density of 230.6 per square mile (89.0/km^{2}).

The racial makeup of the village was 98.38% White, 0.20% African American, 0.20% Native American, 0.20% Asian, 0.20% from other races, and 0.81% from two or more races. Hispanic or Latino of any race made up 2.83% of the population.

There were 180 households, of which 41.7% had children under the age of 18 living with them, 60.0% were married couples living together, 11.1% had a female householder with no husband present, and 25.6% were non-families. Additionally, 22.2% of all households were made up of individuals, and 10.6% had someone living alone who was 65 years of age or older. The average household size was 2.75, and the average family size was 3.24.

The population was distributed as follows: 32.5% under the age of 18, 7.1% from 18 to 24, 32.3% from 25 to 44, 18.2% from 45 to 64, and 9.9% who were 65 years of age or older. The median age was 30 years. For every 100 females, there were 108.9 males. For every 100 females age 18 and over, there were 106.2 males.

The median income for a household in the village was $32,222, and the median income for a family was $48,942. Males had a median income of $33,438, compared to $23,333 for females. The per capita income for the village was $14,908. About 13.8% of families and 15.4% of the population were below the poverty line, including 20.7% of those under age 18 and 2.0% of those age 65 or older.
