= Odessa Township, Michigan =

- Township
- Location within Michigan Location within the United States
- Coordinates: 42°47′28″N 85°8′10″W
- Country: United States
- State: Michigan
- County: Ionia

Area
  - Total: 36.2 sq mi (93.8 km^{2})
  - Land: 35.8 sq mi (92.6 km^{2})
  - Water: 0.46 sq mi (1.2 km^{2})
- Elevation: 860 ft (262 m)

Population (2020)
  - Total: 3,918
  - Density: 110/sq mi (42.3/km^{2})
- Time zone: UTC-5 (Eastern (EST))
  - Summer (DST): UTC-4 (EDT)
- FIPS code: 26-60200
- GNIS feature ID: 1626837
- Website: http://www.odessatownship.org/

Odessa Township is a civil township of Ionia County in the U.S. state of Michigan. The population was 3,918 at the 2020 census.

== Geography ==
According to the United States Census Bureau, the township has a total area of 36.2 square miles (94 km^{2}), of which 35.8 square miles (93 km^{2}) is land and 0.4 square miles (1.0 km^{2}) (1.24%) is water.

== Demographics ==
As of the census of 2000, there were 4,036 people, 1,492 households, and 1,096 families residing in the township. The population density was 112.8 inhabitants per square mile (43.6/km^{2}). There were 1,609 housing units at an average density of 45.0 per square mile (17.4/km^{2}). The racial makeup of the township was 95.39% White, 0.15% African American, 0.50% Native American, 0.50% Asian, 2.18% from other races, and 1.29% from two or more races. Hispanic or Latino of any race were 4.58% of the population.

There were 1,492 households, out of which 38.9% had children under the age of 18 living with them, 57.8% were married couples living together, 11.1% had a female householder with no husband present, and 26.5% were non-families. 22.7% of all households were made up of individuals, and 10.3% had someone living alone who was 65 years of age or older. The average household size was 2.70 and the average family size was 3.14.

In the township the population was spread out, with 30.2% under the age of 18, 8.5% from 18 to 24, 28.8% from 25 to 44, 20.5% from 45 to 64, and 12.1% who were 65 years of age or older. The median age was 34 years. For every 100 females, there were 91.4 males. For every 100 females age 18 and over, there were 90.7 males.

The median income for a household in the township was $40,625, and the median income for a family was $47,802. Males had a median income of $36,235 versus $24,351 for females. The per capita income for the township was $19,505. About 3.5% of families and 5.7% of the population were below the poverty line, including 5.7% of those under age 18 and 4.3% of those age 65 or over.
