= 2024 Michigan Republican presidential nominating contests =

2024 Michigan Republican presidential primary and caucus
- 2024 Michigan Republican presidential primary
- February 27, 2024

16 Republican National Convention delegates

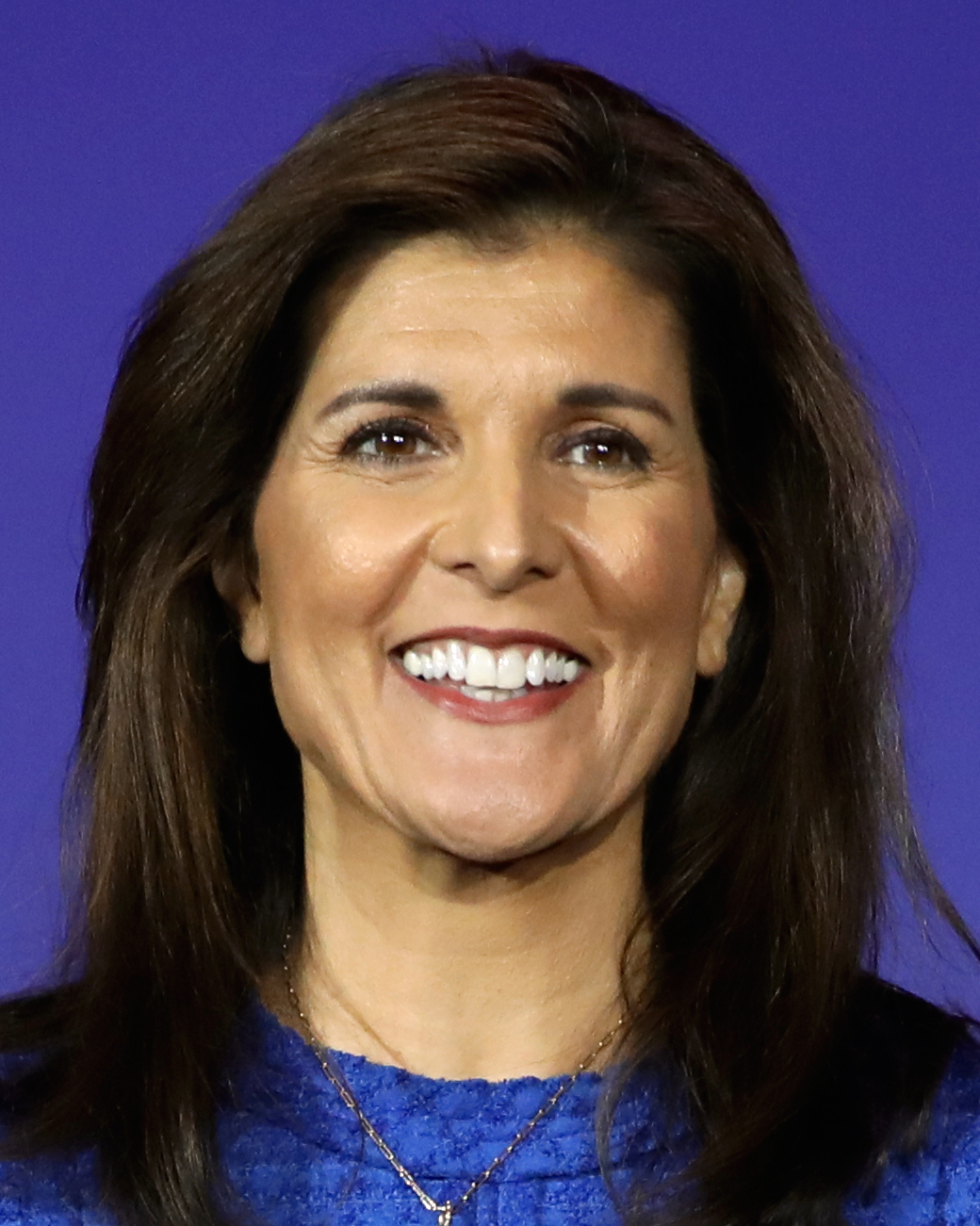
Candidate	Donald Trump	Nikki Haley
Home state	Florida	South Carolina
Delegate count	12	4
Popular vote	761,163	297,124
Percentage	68.12%	26.59%

Trump
50 – 60%
60 – 70%
70 – 80%
80 – 90%
- 2024 Michigan Republican presidential caucuses
- March 2, 2024

39 Republican National Convention delegates

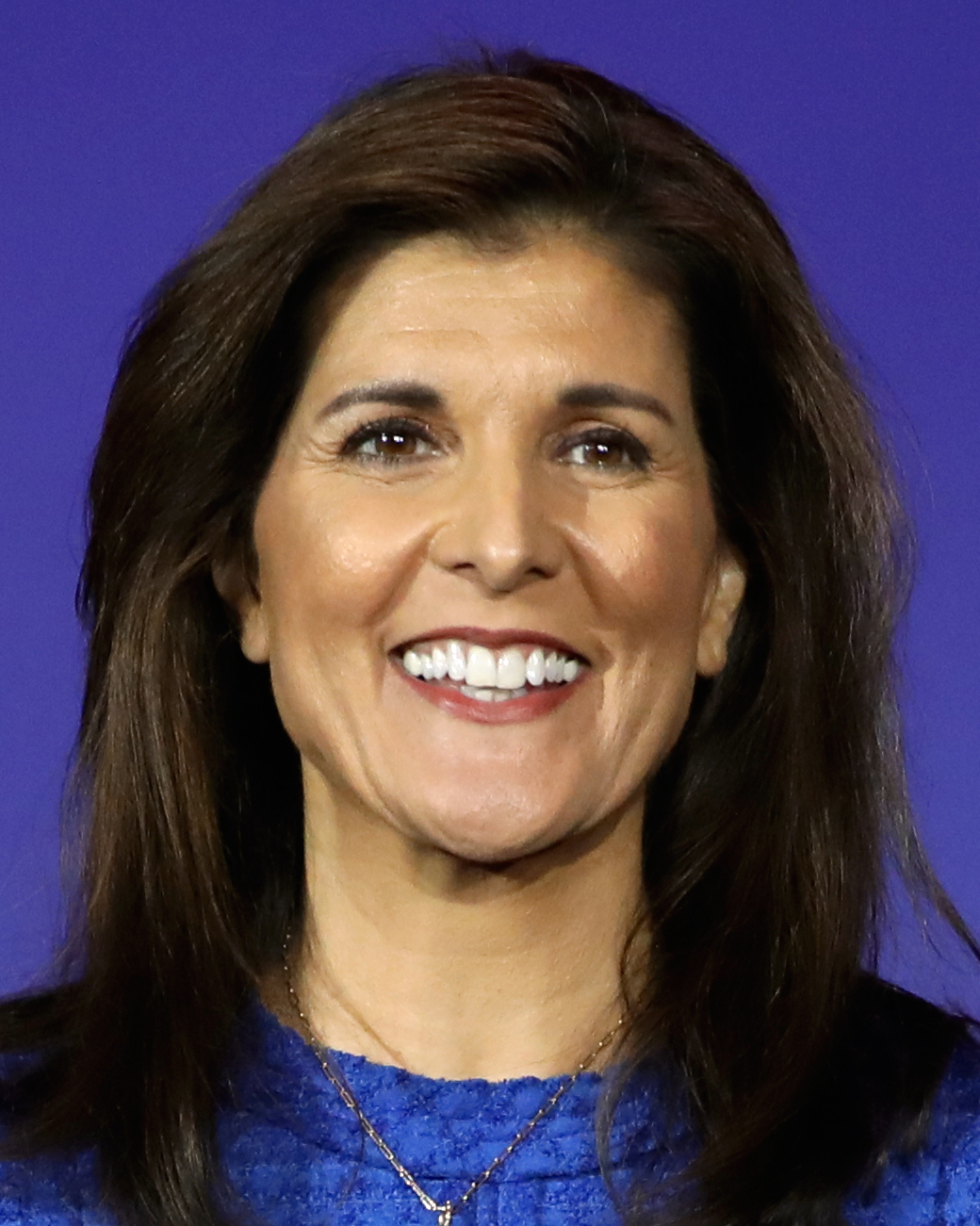
Candidate	Donald Trump	Nikki Haley
Home state	Florida	South Carolina
Delegate count	39	0
Popular vote	1,575	36
Percentage	97.77%	2.23%

The 2024 Michigan Republican presidential primary and caucuses were held on February 27 and on March 2, 2024, respectively, as part of the Republican Party primaries for the 2024 presidential election. 55 delegates to the 2024 Republican National Convention were allocated on a proportional and winner-take-most basis. The primary took place concurrently with its Democratic counterpart, and saw Donald Trump defeat Nikki Haley in a 42-point landslide.

== Background ==
In the 2016 Michigan Republican presidential primary, Donald Trump won with 36.5% of the vote, carrying 25 out of 59 delegates total. His closest opponents, Governor of Ohio John Kasich and Senator from Texas Ted Cruz, received 24.9% and 24.3% of the vote, respectively, with both candidates receiving 17 delegates.

=== Michigan GOP 2024 schism ===
A court case was heard in Grand Rapids by Kent County Judge J. Joseph Rossi in late February determined who controls the state party. Judge Rossi dismissed a lawsuit by Karamo on February 20 to dismiss the case allowing for full hearings on the lawsuit filed by Karamo's critics later in the week regarding whether the RNC recognized chair Hoekstra or Karamo controls the MIGOP. Judge Rossi on February 27 issued a preliminary injunction against Karamo, stating was properly removed as MIGOP chair and barring access by her to MIGOP bank accounts or post office boxes. Karamo declined to say whether she would appeal the ruling and had no comment as to whether the Detroit caucuses will take place. A full trial regarding control of the MIGOP is scheduled to take place on June 10. The Michigan Court of Appeals denied a request on February 29 by Karamo to issue a stay on the court order putting her Detroit caucus in doubt. The chaos affected northern Michigan GOP participants from Michigan's 1st congressional district who had planned to go to Detroit but were barred by missing the deadline to take part in the Grand Rapids caucus. So a third gathering is planned the same day in Houghton Lake. A contingent from Michigan's 4th congressional district was also denied credentials for the Grand Rapids caucuses, so a fourth gathering was announced for the same day in Battle Creek. The Detroit gathering was cancelled. Judge Rossi ruled that Karamo was properly removed as MIGOP chair.

== Procedure ==
16 at-large delegates are allocated based on the results of the February 27 primary to candidates who receive at least 12.5% of the statewide vote.

39 district delegates are allocated based on the results of caucuses in each of the state's 13 congressional districts on March 2. Each of the state's thirteen congressional districts are awarded three delegates. The candidate who wins the majority of the vote in a caucus is awarded all that district's delegates; otherwise, the candidate with the highest vote total is awarded two delegates and the candidate with the second-highest vote total is awarded one delegate.

== Schedule ==
In February 2023, Governor Gretchen Whitmer signed legislation to move up the date of both the Democratic and Republican presidential primaries in Michigan to February 27, 2024, in line with the Democratic National Committee's (DNC) state reorganization plan.

The date violated Republican Party Rule 16(c)(1), which prohibits any state/territory except Iowa, New Hampshire, Nevada, and South Carolina, from holding their primary/caucus until March 1, 2024, violating any other state/territory by stripping 80% of its delegates at the Republican National Convention.

In response, in June 2023, the Michigan Republican Party (MIGOP) passed a resolution of intent that would allocate 16 delegates based on the results of the February 27 primary and 39 delegates based on the results of caucuses in each of the state's 13 congressional districts on March 2.

The convention held by the faction of the Michigan Republican Party recognized by the Republican National Committee led by Pete Hoekstra will be in Grand Rapids at the Amway Grand Plaza Hotel on March 2, while the faction of the Michigan Republican Party led by Kristina Karamo will hold their convention in Detroit at Huntington Place on the same day. While media is invited to the Karamo caucus, it will be closed to the public. The RNC has indicated that only the delegates from the Hoekstra-led convention will be seated for the 2024 Republican National Convention. A court ruling by Judge Joseph Rossi on February 27 indicated that Karamo was properly removed as MIGOP chair and barred Karamo from conducting business on behalf of the "Michigan Republican State Committee or the Michigan Republican Party". Rossi made his ruling retroactive to January 6. A full trial regarding control of the MIGOP is scheduled to take place on June 10. The Michigan Court of Appeals denied a request on February 29 by Karamo to issue a stay on the court order while her appeal is under consideration, putting her Detroit caucus in doubt. The chaos affected delegates from Michigan's 1st congressional district who had planned to go to Detroit but were barred credentials to take part in the Grand Rapids convention; a third gathering is planned the same day in Houghton Lake. A contingent from Michigan's 4th congressional district was also denied credentials for the Grand Rapids caucuses, so a fourth gathering was announced for the same day in Battle Creek. The Detroit gathering was cancelled.

== Primary candidates ==
The Michigan Secretary of State has identified the following candidates, listed alphabetically, as potential Republican Party presidential candidates in 2024:

- Ryan Binkley
- Chris Christie (withdrew January 10, 2024)
- Ron DeSantis (withdrew January 21, 2024)
- Nikki Haley
- Asa Hutchinson (withdrew January 16, 2024)
- Vivek Ramaswamy (withdrew January 15, 2024)
- Donald Trump
- Uncommitted

== Endorsements ==
Ron DeSantis (withdrawn)

State senators

- Aric Nesbitt, District 20 (2023–present) and District 26 (2019–2022); Minority Leader (2023–present)
- Michael Webber, District 9 (2023–present)
- Joe Bellino, District 16 (2023–present)
- Lana Theis, District 22 (2019–present)
- Dan Lauwers, District 25 (2019–present)
- Kevin Daley, District 26 (2023–present) and District 31 (2019–2022)

State representatives

- William Bruck, District 30 (2023–present)
- Mike Mueller, District 51 (2019–2022) and District 72 (2023–present)
- Mike Harris, District 52 (2022–present)
- Donni Steele, District 54 (2023–present)
- Alicia St. Germaine, District 62 (2023–present)
- Jaime Greene, District 65 (2023–present)
- Pat Outman, District 70 (2021–2022) and District 91 (2023–present)
- Brian BeGole, District 71 (2023–present)
- Bryan Posthumus, District 73 (2021–2022) and District 90 (2023–present)
- Brad Paquette, District 78 (2019–present)
- Phil Green, Michigan State Representative from District 84 (2019–2022) and District 67 (2023–present)
- Luke Meerman, District 88 (2019–present)
- Jerry Neyer, District 92 (2023–present)
- Tom Leonard, District 93 (2013–2019); Republican nominee for Attorney General in 2018
- Timothy Beson, District 96 (2021–present)
- Matthew Bierlein, District 97 (2023–present)
- Gregory S. Alexander, District 98 (2023–present)
- Tom Kunse, Michigan State Representative from District 100 (2023–present)
- Curt VanderWall, District 101 (2017–2018) and District 102 (2023–present)
- John Roth, District 104 (2021–present)
Nikki Haley

State senator

- Jim Stamas, Member of the Michigan Senate from the 36th district (2015–2022)
- Wayne Schmidt, Member of the Michigan Senate from the 37th district (2023–present)

State representatives

- Pamela Hornberger, District 32 (2017-2023)
- Joseph Haveman, District 90 (2009-2014)

Newspapers

- The Detroit News (co-endorsement with Dean Phillips)
Perry Johnson (withdrawn)

Former federal official

- Pete Hoekstra, U.S. Ambassador to the Netherlands (2018–2021); U.S. Representative from MI-02 (1993–2011); Republican nominee for U.S. Senate in 2012
Donald Trump

U.S. Representatives

- Kerry Bentivolio, MI-11 (2013–2015)
- Jack Bergman, MI-01 (2017–present)
- Bill Huizenga, MI-04 (2023–present) and MI-02 (2011–2023)
- John James, MI-10 (2023–present)
- Lisa McClain, MI-09 (2023–present) and MI-10 (2021–2023); Secretary of the House Republican Conference (2023–present)
- John Moolenaar, MI-02 (2023–present) and MI-04 (2015–2023)
- Mike Rogers, MI-08 (2001–2015) and Republican candidate for U.S. Senator from Michigan in 2024
- Tim Walberg, MI-05 (2023–present) and MI-07 (2011–2023, 2007–2009)

State senator

- Jim Runestad, Member of the Michigan Senate from the 23rd district (2023–present) and the 15th district (2019–2022)

State representatives

- Bob Bezotte, District 50 (2023–present) and District 47 (2021–2023)
- Steve Carra, District 36 (2023–present) and District 59 (2021–2023)
- Matt Maddock, District 59 (2023–present) and District 44 (2019–2023)

Former party official

- Meshawn Maddock, co-chair of the Michigan Republican Party (2019–2023)

Former local official

- James Craig, Chief of the Detroit Police Department (2013–2021)

Individuals

- Perry Johnson, disqualified candidate for governor in 2022 and withdrawn candidate for president in 2024

== Maps ==
Endorsements by incumbent Republicans in the Michigan House of Representatives. Endorsed Donald Trump (40) Endorsed Nikki Haley (1) No endorsement (13)

== Polling ==
Source of poll aggregation	Dates administered	Dates updated	Nikki Haley	Donald Trump	Other/ Undecided (Note: Calculated by taking the difference of 100% and all other candidates combined.)	Margin
FiveThirtyEight	through February 24, 2024	February 27, 2024	21.8%	78.7%	-	Trump +56.9

Poll source	Date(s) administered	Sample size (Note: Key: A – all adults RV – registered voters LV – likely voters V – unclear)	Margin of error	Doug Burgum	Chris Christie	Ron DeSantis	Nikki Haley	Will Hurd	Asa Hutchinson	Perry Johnson	Mike Pence	Vivek Ramaswamy	Tim Scott	Donald Trump	Other	Undecided
Emerson College/The Hill	Feb 20–24, 2024	486 (LV)	±3%	–	–	–	20.3%	–	–	–	–	–	–	69.2%	–	10.5%
Michigan Information and Research Service (MIRS)	Jan 4–10, 2024	600 (LV)	±4%	3%	8%	9%	19%	–	–	–	–	2%	–	53%	–	6%
CNN/SSRS	Nov 30 – December 7, 2023	618 (LV)	± 3.4%	1%	6%	15%	13%	–	1%	–	–	4%	–	58%	1%	3%
Morning Consult	Nov 1–30, 2023	1,348 (LV)	–	0%	3%	13%	10%	–	0%	–	–	8%	1%	65%	–	–
Morning Consult	Oct 1–31, 2023	1,342 (LV)	–	1%	3%	10%	6%	0%	0%	–	7%	9%	1%	63%	–	–
Public Policy Polling (D)	Oct 9–10, 2023	430 (LV)	± 4.7%	2%	3%	13%	6%	–	0%	–	2%	3%	0%	63%	–	8%
Morning Consult	Sep 1–30, 2023	1,238 (LV)	–	0%	4%	12%	6%	0%	0%	–	7%	10%	1%	58%	–	2%
Susquehanna University	Sep 7–12, 2023	219 (LV)	–	0%	0%	18%	3%	–	0%	–	5%	5%	0%	65%	–	–
Morning Consult	Aug 1–31, 2023	1,299 (LV)	–	0%	4%	15%	3%	0%	1%	–	8%	8%	2%	59%	0% (Note: Francis Suarez with 0%)	–
Emerson College	Aug 1–2, 2023	498 (RV)	± 4.3%	1%	2%	13%	3%	0%	1%	0%	7%	4%	2%	61%	1%	6%
Morning Consult	July 1–31, 2023	1,350 (LV)	–	–	3%	18%	3%	0%	1%	–	10%	7%	2%	55%	–	1%
Mitchell Research (Note: Poll commissioned by MIRS)	Jul 11–13, 2023	639 (LV)	± 4.0%	–	–	13%	1%	–	–	0%	3%	–	2%	69%	–	11%
Morning Consult	June 1–30, 2023	1,242 (LV)	–	1%	2%	25%	3%	0%	2%	–	9%	3%	3%	52%	1% (Note: Liz Cheney with 1%; Greg Abbott and Kristi Noem with 0%)	–
Morning Consult	May 1–31, 2023	1,354 (LV)	–	–	–	25%	2%	–	1%	–	9%	5%	1%	53%	5% (Note: Liz Cheney with 3%; Glenn Youngkin, Greg Abbott, and Kristi Noem with 0%)	1%
Morning Consult	Apr 1–30, 2023	1,356 (LV)	–	–	–	26%	3%	–	0%	–	10%	2%	1%	53%	5% (Note: Liz Cheney with 3%; Mike Pompeo and Glenn Youngkin with 1%; Greg Abbott and Kristi Noem with 0%)	–
Morning Consult	Mar 1–31, 2023	1,378 (LV)	–	–	–	30%	3%	–	–	–	10%	0%	1%	51%	5% (Note: Liz Cheney with 3%; Greg Abbott and Mike Pompeo with 1%; Kristi Noem and Glenn Youngkin with 0%)	–
Morning Consult	Feb 1–28, 2023	1,232 (LV)	–	–	–	32%	4%	–	–	–	10%	0%	1%	46%	6% (Note: Liz Cheney with 3%; Greg Abbott, Kristi Noem, and Mike Pompeo with 1%; Ted Cruz and Glenn Youngkin with 0%)	1%
Echelon Insights	Feb 13–16, 2023	400 (V)	± 6.0%	–	–	47%	–	–	–	–	–	–	–	42%	11%	–
Morning Consult	Jan 1–31, 2023	1,709 (LV)	–	–	–	33%	1%	–	–	–	10%	–	0%	48%	5% (Note: Liz Cheney with 3%; Mike Pompeo and Ted Cruz with 1%; Kristi Noem, Greg Abbott, and Glenn Youngkin with 0%)	3%
Morning Consult	Dec 1–31, 2022	909 (LV)	–	–	–	32%	1%	–	–	–	10%	–	0%	50%	7% (Note: Ted Cruz with 3%; Liz Cheney with 2%; Mike Pompeo and Kristi Noem with 1%; Greg Abbott and Glenn Youngkin with 0%)	–
Glengariff Group	Jul 13–15, 2022	500 (LV)	± 4.4%	–	–	42%	–	–	–	–	–	–	–	45%	13%	–

== Results ==
=== Primary ===
Michigan Republican primary, February 27, 2024
Candidate	Votes	Percentage	Actual delegate count		
Candidate	Votes	Percentage	Bound	Unbound	Total
Donald Trump	761,163	68.12%	12	0	12
Nikki Haley	297,124	26.59%	4	0	4
Uncommitted	33,649	3.01%	0	0	0
Ron DeSantis (withdrawn)	13,456	1.20%	0	0	0
Chris Christie (withdrawn)	4,794	0.43%	0	0	0
Vivek Ramaswamy (withdrawn)	3,702	0.33%	0	0	0
Ryan Binkley	2,348	0.21%	0	0	0
Asa Hutchinson (withdrawn)	1,077	0.10%	0	0	0
Total:	1,117,313	100.00%	16	0	16

=== Caucus ===
CBS called the results for Donald Trump at 6:02PM (EST) with Trump winning all 39 delegates available from the caucus.

Michigan Republican caucus, March 2, 2024
Candidate	Votes	Percentage	Actual delegate count		
Candidate	Votes	Percentage	Bound	Unbound	Total
Donald Trump	1,575	97.77%	39	0	39
Nikki Haley	36	2.23%	0	0	0
Total:	1,611	100.00%	39	0	39

== See also ==
- 2024 Michigan Democratic presidential primary
- 2024 Republican Party presidential primaries
- 2024 United States presidential election
- 2024 United States presidential election in Michigan
- 2024 United States elections

== Notes ==
Partisan clients
