= 2012 Michigan elections =

- November 6, 2012

The 2012 Michigan elections were held in the U.S. state of Michigan on November 6, 2012. The presidential primary was held on February 28th. The state primary was held on August 7th.

== Federal ==
=== Presidential primaries ===
Michigan held its presidential primary on February 28, 2012. Incumbent president Barack Obama won the Democratic primary, unopposed. Mitt Romney won the Republican primary. Romney would go on to be the Republican nominee for president.

=== Presidential general election ===
Incumbent Democratic President Barack Obama won the state of Michigan over Republican nominee Mitt Romney. All 16 of Michigan's presidential electors voted for Obama.

=== U.S. House of Representatives ===
In the 2012 redistricting cycle, Michigan lost one congressional seat, reducing it to 14 congressional districts. In the 2012 U.S. House election in Michigan, Republicans won 9 seats while Democrats won 5.

=== U.S. House special election ===
There was a special election in Michigan's 11th congressional district, triggered by the resignation of Republican Thaddeus McCotter. The special primary was held on September 5. The special general election was held alongside the main general election, on November 6. Democrat David Curson won the special election to fill the unexpired term, but did not run in the general election to serve a full term.

== Legislature ==
=== House of Representatives election ===
Before the 2012 election, the state House had a 64–46 Republican majority over the Democrats. After the election, the Republicans lost five seats. Their majority was maintained, though it was reduced to 59–51.

=== House special elections ===
There were special elections on February 28, 2012, in 29th state House district and the 51st state House district. In the 29th district, incumbent Democrat Tim Melton resigned. In the 51st district, incumbent Republican Paul H. Scott faced a successful recall election in 2011. The 29th district was won by Democrat Tim Greimel. The 51st district was won by Republican Joseph Graves.

== Judiciary ==
=== Supreme Court ===
There were three justices of the Michigan Supreme Court elected on November 6, 2012. While two elections were for full, 8-year terms, one election was for a partial term of only two years. While Michigan State Supreme Court elections are officially nonpartisan, the candidates are permitted to be nominated at political party conventions. For the partial term, Republican Brian K. Zahra, who was appointed by Governor Rick Snyder to fill the vacancy left by fellow Republican Maura D. Corrigan, was elected. In the two full seats, Republican incumbent Stephen Markman was re-elected and Democrat Bridget Mary McCormack was elected, replacing incumbent Democrat Marilyn Jean Kelly who was barred due to her age from running again. The election preserved the 4–3 majority the Republicans had on the court.

== Michigan State Board of Education and University boards ==
=== Michigan State Board of Education ===
There were two seats on the Michigan State Board of Education up for election on November 6, 2012. In one seat, the incumbent Democrat Marianne Yared McGuire did not seek re-election. In the other seat, incumbent Republican Nancy Danhof was defeated in her attempt at renomination. Both open seats were won by Democrats, Michelle Fecteau and Lupe Ramos-Montigny. This increased the Democratic majority on the board over the Republicans, leaving it at 6–2.

=== Michigan State University Board of Trustees election ===
There were two seats on the Michigan State University Board of Trustees up for election on November 6, 2012. Incumbents, Democrat Joel Ferguson and Republican Melanie Foster, sought re-election. Ferguson was re-elected, but Foster was unseated by Democratic candidate Brian Mosallam. This increased the Democratic majority on the board.

=== University of Michigan Board of Regents ===
There were two open seats on the University of Michigan Board of Regents up for election on November 6, 2012. The seats were won by Democrats Mark Bernstein and Shauna Diggs, succeeding fellow Democrats Olivia Maynard and S. Martin Taylor. The election maintained a Democratic majority on the board.

=== Wayne State University Governor election ===
There were two open seats up for election on the Wayne State University board of governors on November 6, 2012. Two incumbent Democrats, Tina Abbott and Annetta Miller, did not seek re-election. The election was won by two Democrats, Kim Trent and Sandra Hughes O'Brien. This maintained the Democratic majority on the board.

== Ballot initiatives ==
There were six state ballot proposals in November 6, 2012, and all of them were rejected by votes. Of the six proposals, five sought to amend the Michigan Constitution.

== Local elections ==
The following is an incomplete list of 2012 elections in notable localities.

=== Bay County Executive election ===
Incumbent Bay County executive Thomas L. Hickner, a Democrat, was re-elected unopposed.

=== Oakland County Executive election ===
Incumbent Republican Oakland County executive L. Brooks Patterson was re-elected.

=== Troy mayoral recall election ===
Troy mayor Janice Daniels faced a successful recall election on November 6, 2012, ousting her from office.
