= 2010 Michigan House of Representatives election =

- November 2, 2010

All 110 seats in the Michigan House of Representatives 56 seats needed for a majority
- Turnout: 3,048,574 (41.89%)
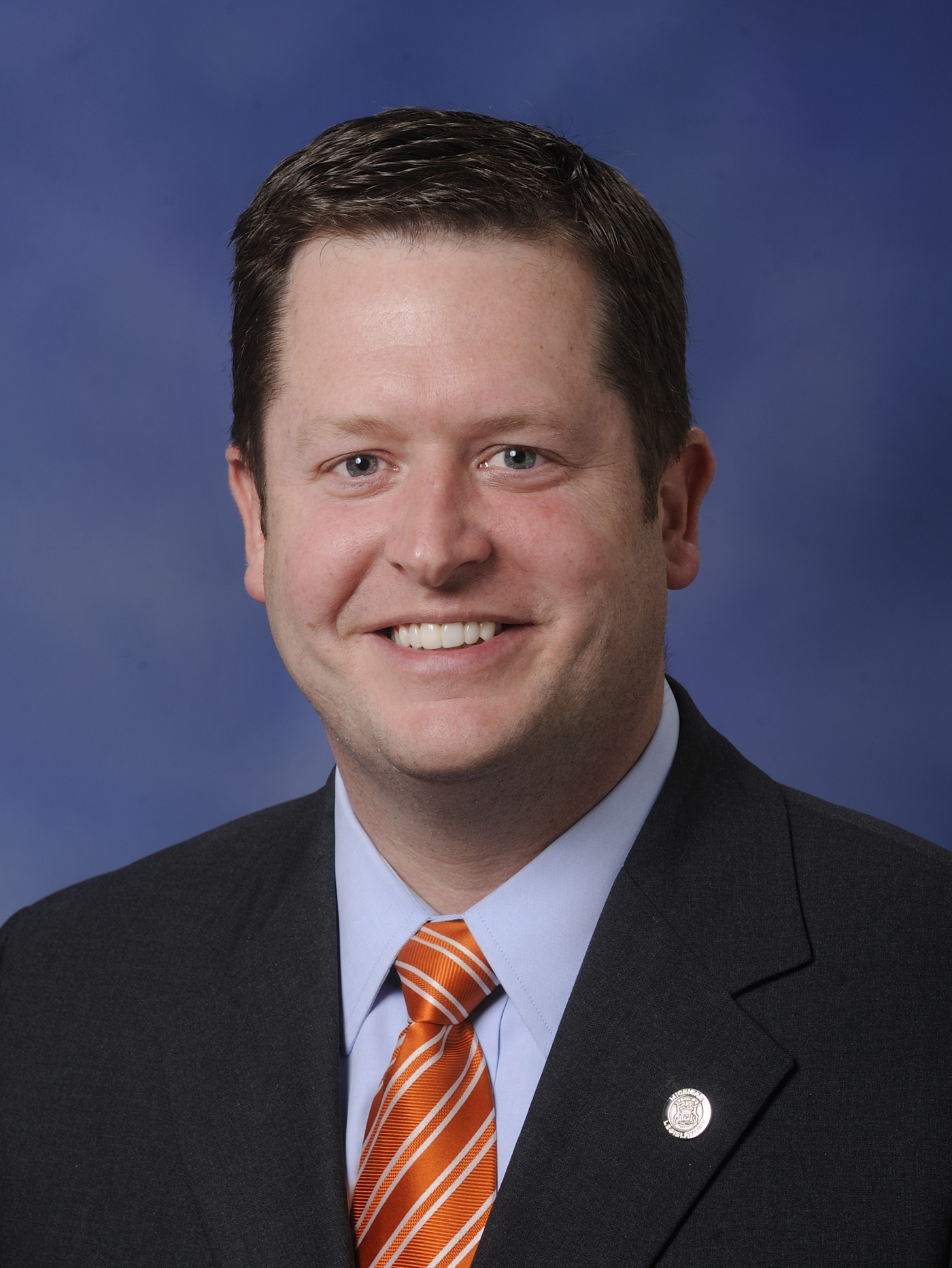

	Majority party	Minority party
Leader	James "Jase" Bolger	Richard Hammel
Party	Republican	Democratic
Leader's seat	63rd district	48th district
Last election	43	67
Seats after	63	47
Seat change	▲20	▼20
popular vote	1,646,704	1,401,870
Percentage	54.02%	45.98%
- Results: Republican gain Democratic hold Republican hold
Speaker before election
Andy Dillon
Democratic
Elected Speaker
Jase Bolger
Republican

The 2010 elections for the Michigan House of Representatives were held on November 2, 2010, with partisan primary elections held August 3, 2010, to determine the party's nominees.

== Overview ==
Due to term limit provisions in Michigan's Constitution, 54 candidates were unable to seek re-election to the House, resulting in the largest turnover in the lower chamber since the adoption of term limits in 1992.

Republicans flipped twenty seats from the Democrats, winning control of the chamber, and, alongside Rick Snyder's victory in the gubernatorial election, complete control of the state's government. This gave Republicans complete control over the redistricting process, allowing them to redraw the state legislature's boundaries after the 2010 census, which enabled them to retain control of the chamber until the 2022 elections.

== Predictions ==
Source	Ranking	As of
Governing	Tossup	November 1, 2010

== Results by district ==
=== Districts 1–28 ===
1st district (Wayne (Harper Woods, Grosse Pointe Woods, Grosse Pointe Township, Grosse Pointe Farms, Grosse Pointe, Grosse Pointe Park, far east Detroit))
Party	Candidate	Votes	%
Democratic	Tim Bledsoe (incumbent)	17,131	52.96
Republican	Janice DuMouchelle	15,215	47.04
Total votes		32,346	100.0
Democratic hold			

2nd district (Wayne (northeast Detroit))
Party	Candidate	Votes	%
Democratic	Lisa Howze	11,320	96.12
Republican	Damian Mitchell	457	3.88
Total votes		11,777	100.0
Democratic hold			

3rd district (Wayne (southeast Detroit))
Party	Candidate	Votes	%
Democratic	Alberta Tinsley-Talabi	13,162	93.97
Republican	Daniel Lamar	523	3.73
Green	Fred Vitale	322	2.3
Total votes		14,007	100.0
Democratic hold			

4th district (Wayne (south-central Detroit))
Party	Candidate	Votes	%
Democratic	Maureen Stapleton	15,561	94.89
Republican	Lillian Smith	547	3.34
Independent	Danetta Simpson	291	1.77
Total votes		16,399	100.0
Democratic hold			

5th district (Wayne (north Detroit, Highland Park, Hamtramck))
Party	Candidate	Votes	%
Democratic	John Olumba	11,567	89.85
Republican	Jermain Lee Jones	771	5.99
Independent	Alim Muhammad	536	4.16
Total votes		12,874	100.0
Democratic hold			

6th district (Wayne (south-central Detroit))
Party	Candidate	Votes	%
Democratic	Fred Durhal (incumbent)	14,194	96.49
Republican	Robert Midgett	516	3.51
Total votes		14,710	100.0
Democratic hold			

7th district (Wayne (north-central Detroit))
Party	Candidate	Votes	%
Democratic	Jimmy Womack (incumbent)	16,676	95.12
Republican	Debra Duren	511	2.91
Green	Derek Grigsby	345	1.97
Total votes		17,532	100.0
Democratic hold			

8th district (Wayne (northwest Detroit))
Party	Candidate	Votes	%
Democratic	Thomas Stallworth	22,790	97.46
Republican	Keith Franklin	595	2.54
Total votes		23,385	100.0
Democratic hold			

9th district (Wayne (far northwest Detroit))
Party	Candidate	Votes	%
Democratic	Shanelle Jackson (incumbent)	19,063	95
Republican	David Porter	683	3.4
Independent	Kenneth Haney	187	0.93
Independent	D'Artagnan Collier	134	0.67
Total votes		20,067	100.0
Democratic hold			

10th district (Wayne (west Detroit))
Party	Candidate	Votes	%
Democratic	Harvey Santana	14,000	93.99
Republican	Jasmine Ford	895	6.01
Total votes		14,895	100.0
Democratic hold			

11th district (Wayne (west-central Detroit))
Party	Candidate	Votes	%
Democratic	David Nathan (incumbent)	16,272	97.08
Republican	Leonard Mier	489	2.92
Total votes		16,761	100.0
Democratic hold			

12th district (Wayne (southwest Detroit))
Party	Candidate	Votes	%
Democratic	Rashida Tlaib (incumbent)	6,975	91.96
Republican	Darrin Daigle	610	8.04
Total votes		7,585	100.0
Democratic hold			

13th district (Wayne (Riverview, Southgate, Trenton, Wyandotte))
Party	Candidate	Votes	%
Democratic	Andrew Kandrevas (incumbent)	14,335	52.67
Republican	Cynthia Kallgren	12,130	44.56
Libertarian	Jesse Church	754	2.77
Total votes		27,219	100.0
Democratic hold			

14th district (Wayne (Ecorse, Lincoln Park, Melvindale, River Rouge, south Allen Park))
Party	Candidate	Votes	%
Democratic	Paul Clemente	13,227	66.96
Republican	Patrick O'Connell	6,526	33.04
Total votes		19,753	100.0
Democratic hold			

15th district (Wayne (Dearborn—excluding northeast tip))
Party	Candidate	Votes	%
Democratic	George Darany	12,408	52.5
Republican	Suzanne Sareini	10,220	43.24
Constitution	Daryl Smith	1,007	4.26
Total votes		23,635	100.0
Democratic hold			

16th district (Wayne (north Allen Park, Dearborn Heights--southwest tip, Garden City, Inkster))
Party	Candidate	Votes	%
Democratic	Bob Constan (incumbent)	14,724	67.3
Republican	Michael Mullins	7,153	32.7
Total votes		21,877	100.0
Democratic hold			

17th district (Wayne (Dearborn Heights—excluding southwest tip, Livonia--southeast tip, Redford Township))
Party	Candidate	Votes	%
Democratic	Phil Cavanagh	16,668	62.54
Republican	Mike Adams	9,985	37.46
Total votes		26,653	100.0
Democratic hold			

18th district (Wayne (Westland))
Party	Candidate	Votes	%
Democratic	Richard LeBlanc (incumbent)	14,792	69
Republican	Floyd Collins	6,645	31
Total votes		21,437	100.0
Democratic hold			

19th district (Wayne (Livonia—excluding southeast tip))
Party	Candidate	Votes	%
Republican	John J. Walsh (incumbent)	23,141	66.47
Democratic	Joseph Larkin	11,671	33.53
Total votes		34,812	100.0
Republican hold			

20th district (Wayne (Northville--portion within county, Northville Township, Plymouth, Plymouth Township, east Canton Township, Wayne))
Party	Candidate	Votes	%
Republican	Kurt Heise	20,920	58.03
Democratic	Joan Wadsworth	15,128	41.97
Total votes		36,048	100.0
Republican gain from Democratic			

21st district (Wayne (Belleville, Van Buren Township, Canton Township—excluding eastern slice))
Party	Candidate	Votes	%
Democratic	Dian Slavens (incumbent)	18,200	51.24
Republican	Lori Levi	17,320	48.76
Total votes		35,520	100.0
Democratic hold			

22nd district (Wayne (Romulus, Taylor))
Party	Candidate	Votes	%
Democratic	Doug Geiss (incumbent)	14,294	67.93
Republican	Darrell McNeill	6,748	32.07
Total votes		21,042	100.0
Democratic hold			

23rd district (Wayne (Brownstown Township, Flat Rock, Gibraltar, Grosse Ile Township, Huron Township, Rockwood, Sumpter Township, Woodhaven))
Party	Candidate	Votes	%
Republican	Pat Somerville	15,742	53.55
Democratic	Deb Kennedy (incumbent)	13,657	46.45
Total votes		29,399	100.0
Republican gain from Democratic			

24th district (Macomb (Harrison Township, Lake Township, St. Clair Shores))
Party	Candidate	Votes	%
Republican	Anthony Forlini	16,552	51.62
Democratic	Sarah Roberts (incumbent)	15,516	48.38
Total votes		32,068	100.0
Republican gain from Democratic			

25th district (Macomb (south Sterling Heights, north Warren))
Party	Candidate	Votes	%
Democratic	Jon Switalski (incumbent)	14,890	53.07
Republican	Sean Clark	13,167	46.93
Total votes		28,057	100.0
Democratic hold			

26th district (Oakland (Madison Heights, Royal Oak))
Party	Candidate	Votes	%
Democratic	Jim Townsend	15,489	52.03
Republican	Ken Rosen	13,344	44.82
Libertarian	James Young	938	3.15
Total votes		29,771	100.0
Democratic hold			

27th district (Oakland (Berkley, Ferndale, Hazel Park, Huntington Woods, north Oak Park, Pleasant Ridge))
Party	Candidate	Votes	%
Democratic	Ellen Cogen Lipton (incumbent)	19,245	69.89
Republican	Michelangelo Fortuna III	8,293	30.11
Total votes		27,538	100.0
Democratic hold			

28th district (Macomb (south Warren, Center Line))
Party	Candidate	Votes	%
Democratic	Lesia Liss (incumbent)	12,388	62.98
Republican	Marc Goodson	7,281	37.02
Total votes		19,669	100.0
Democratic hold			

=== Districts 29–55 ===
29th district (Oakland (Auburn Hills, Pontiac))
Party	Candidate	Votes	%
Democratic	Tim Melton	14,199	60.31
Republican	Bret Allen	9,344	39.69
Total votes		23,543	100.0
Democratic hold			

30th district (Macomb (north Sterling Heights, Utica))
Party	Candidate	Votes	%
Republican	Jeff Farrington	15,736	55.73
Democratic	Ken Lampar	12,501	44.27
Total votes		28,237	100.0
Republican hold			

31st district (Macomb (Clinton Township—excluding northeast portion, north Fraser, Mount Clemens))
Party	Candidate	Votes	%
Democratic	Marilyn Lane	12,710	53.89
Republican	Daniel Tollis	10,874	46.11
Total votes		23,584	100.0
Democratic hold			

32nd district (Macomb (Armada Township, Chesterfield Township, Lenox Township, south Memphis, New Baltimore, Richmond—excluding portion outside county, Richmond Township), St. Clair (Columbus Township, Ira Township, Kimball Township, Wales Township))
Party	Candidate	Votes	%
Republican	Andrea LaFontaine	12,541	51.99
Democratic	Jennifer Haase (incumbent)	11,580	48.01
Total votes		24,121	100.0
Republican gain from Democratic			

33rd district (Macomb (Macomb Township, Ray Township, northwest Clinton Township))
Party	Candidate	Votes	%
Republican	Ken Goike	24,467	66.48
Democratic	Andrew Prasiloski	12,338	33.52
Total votes		36,805	100.0
Republican hold			

34th district (Genesee (north Flint))
Party	Candidate	Votes	%
Democratic	Woodrow Stanley (incumbent)	11,613	83.39
Republican	Bruce Rogers	2,313	16.61
Total votes		13,926	100.0
Democratic hold			

35th district (Oakland (Lathrup Village, southwest Oak Park, Royal Oak Township, Southfield))
Party	Candidate	Votes	%
Democratic	Rudy Hobbs	28,280	87.79
Republican	Michael Weinenger	3,933	12.21
Total votes		32,213	100.0
Democratic hold			

36th district (Macomb (Bruce Township, Shelby Township, Washington Township))
Party	Candidate	Votes	%
Republican	Pete Lund (incumbent)	25,552	69.86
Democratic	Robert Murphy	11,025	30.14
Total votes		36,577	100.0
Republican hold			

37th district (Oakland (Farmington, Farmington Hills))
Party	Candidate	Votes	%
Democratic	Vicki Barnett (incumbent)	21,223	62.14
Republican	Christopher Atallah	12,929	37.86
Total votes		34,152	100.0
Democratic hold			

38th district (Oakland (Lyon Township, Northville-excluding portion outside county, Novi, Novi Township, South Lyon, Walled Lake, Wixom))
Party	Candidate	Votes	%
Republican	Hugh Crawford (incumbent)	22,870	67.53
Democratic	Jeffrey Gedeon	10,998	32.47
Total votes		33,868	100.0
Republican hold			

39th district (Oakland (Commerce Township, south West Bloomfield Township))
Party	Candidate	Votes	%
Democratic	Lisa Brown (incumbent)	17,138	49.08
Republican	Lois Shulman	17,051	48.83
Libertarian	Nathan Allen	727	2.08
Total votes		34,916	100.0
Democratic hold			

40th district (Oakland (Birmingham, Bloomfield Hills, Bloomfield Township, Keego Harbor, Orchard Lake Village, Southfield Township, Sylvan Lake))
Party	Candidate	Votes	%
Republican	Chuck Moss (incumbent)	27,621	67.42
Democratic	Julie Candler	13,346	32.58
Total votes		40,967	100.0
Republican hold			

41st district (Oakland (Clawson, Troy))
Party	Candidate	Votes	%
Republican	Marty Knollenberg (incumbent)	22,538	66.26
Democratic	Ed Spillers	11,477	33.74
Total votes		34,015	100.0
Republican hold			

42nd district (Macomb (Eastpointe, south Fraser, Roseville))
Party	Candidate	Votes	%
Democratic	Harold Haugh (incumbent)	14,927	66.57
Republican	Stuart Jason	7,497	33.43
Total votes		22,424	100.0
Democratic hold			

43rd district (Oakland (Lake Angelus, Waterford Township, northwest West Bloomfield Township))
Party	Candidate	Votes	%
Republican	Gail Haines (incumbent)	17,295	65.61
Democratic	Regina Strong	9,064	34.39
Total votes		26,359	100.0
Republican hold			

44th district (Oakland (Highland Township, Independence Township, Springfield Township, Clarkston Village, White Lake Township))
Party	Candidate	Votes	%
Republican	Eileen Kowall (incumbent)	25,714	70.52
Democratic	Philip Fabrizio	9,395	25.77
Libertarian	Thomas Johnson	1,355	3.72
Total votes		36,464	100.0
Republican hold			

45th district (Oakland (Oakland Township, Rochester Hills, Rochester))
Party	Candidate	Votes	%
Republican	Tom McMillin (incumbent)	24,973	67.88
Democratic	Mary Ward	11,815	32.12
Total votes		36,788	100.0
Republican hold			

46th district (Oakland (Addison Township, Brandon Township, Groveland Township, Holly Township, Orion Township, Oxford Township, Rose Township))
Party	Candidate	Votes	%
Republican	Bradford Jacobsen	24,364	72.5
Democratic	David Jay Lillis	9,240	27.5
Total votes		33,604	100.0
Republican hold			

47th district (Livingston (Cohoctah Township, Conway Township, Deerfield Township, Hamburg Township, Handy Township, Hartland Township, Howell, Howell Township, Iosco Township, Marion Township--small northeast portion, Putnam Township, Tyrone Township, Unadilla Township
Party	Candidate	Votes	%
Republican	Cindy Denby (incumbent)	22,448	69.62
Democratic	Garry Post	9,794	30.38
Total votes		32,242	100.0
Republican hold			

48th district (Genesee (Clayton Township--northwest half, Clio, Flushing, Flushing Township, Montrose, Montrose Township, Mount Morris, Mount Morris Township, Thetford Township, Vienna Township))
Party	Candidate	Votes	%
Democratic	Richard Hammel (incumbent)	15,322	57.34
Republican	Susan Culver	11,401	42.66
Total votes		26,723	100.0
Democratic hold			

49th district (Genesee (Clayton Township--southeast half, south Flint, Flint Township, Gaines Township, Swartz Creek))
Party	Candidate	Votes	%
Democratic	Jim Ananich	15,647	67.28
Republican	Allen Pool	7,610	32.72
Total votes		23,257	100.0
Democratic hold			

50th district (Genesee (Burton, Davison, Davison Township, Genesee Township, Richfield Township))
Party	Candidate	Votes	%
Democratic	Charles Smiley	13,647	52.93
Republican	William Ralph	12,134	47.07
Total votes		25,781	100.0
Democratic hold			

51st district (Genesee (Argentine Township, Atlas Township, Fenton, Fenton Township, Grand Blanc, Grand Blanc Township, Linden, Mundy Township))
Party	Candidate	Votes	%
Republican	Paul Scott (incumbent)	21,576	59.4
Democratic	Art Reyes	14,745	40.6
Total votes		36,321	100.0
Republican hold			

52nd district (Washtenaw (north Ann Arbor, north Ann Arbor Township, Bridgewater Township, Dexter Township, Freedom Township, Lima Township, Lodi Township, Lyndon Township, Manchester Township, Northfield Township, Saline, Scio Township--most, Sharon Township, Sylvan T
Party	Candidate	Votes	%
Republican	Mark Ouimet	21,462	51.73
Democratic	Christine Green	20,027	48.27
Total votes		41,489	100.0
Republican gain from Democratic			

53rd district (Washtenaw (south Ann Arbor, south Ann Arbor Township))
Party	Candidate	Votes	%
Democratic	Jeff Irwin	23,436	80.46
Republican	Chase Ingersoll	5,692	19.54
Total votes		29,128	100.0
Democratic hold			

54th district (Washtenaw (Augusta Township, Salem Township, Superior Township, Ypsilanti, Ypsilanti Township))
Party	Candidate	Votes	%
Democratic	David Rutledge	18,146	61.16
Republican	Richard Deitering	9,708	32.72
Independent	David Palmer	1,363	4.59
Constitution	Clifford McKinney	451	1.52
Total votes		29,668	100.0
Democratic hold			

55th district (Monroe (Beford Township, Dundee Township, Erie Township, Milan, Milan Township, Petersburg, Summerfield Township, Whiteford Township), Washtenaw (Milan, Pittsfield Township, Saline Township, York Township))
Party	Candidate	Votes	%
Republican	Rick Olson	17,295	52.93
Democratic	Mike Smith	15,381	47.07
Total votes		32,676	100.0
Republican gain from Democratic			

=== Districts 56–83 ===
56th district (Monroe (Ash Township, Berlin Township, Exeter Township, Frenchtown Township, Ida Township, LaSalle Township, London Township, Luna Pier, Monroe, Monroe Township, Raisinville Township))
Party	Candidate	Votes	%
Republican	Dale Zorn	13,592	53.36
Democratic	Kate Ebli (incumbent)	11,879	46.64
Total votes		25,471	100.0
Republican gain from Democratic			

57th district (Lenawee (excluding Cambridge Township))
Party	Candidate	Votes	%
Republican	Nancy Jenkins	16,442	57.2
Democratic	Harvey Schmidt	12,301	42.8
Total votes		28,743	100.0
Republican gain from Democratic			

58th district (Branch, Hillsdale)
Party	Candidate	Votes	%
Republican	Kenneth Kurtz (incumbent)	21,222	100
Total votes		21,222	100.0
Republican hold			

59th district (Cass (excluding Dowagiac, Howard Township, Niles, Silver Creek Township, Wayne Township), St. Joseph)
Party	Candidate	Votes	%
Republican	Matt Lori (incumbent)	17,603	72
Democratic	Carol Higgins	6,846	28
Total votes		24,449	100.0
Republican hold			

60th district (Kalamazoo (Cooper Township, Kalamazoo, east Kalamazoo Township))
Party	Candidate	Votes	%
Republican	Jeff Fernandez	8,022	36.69
Democratic	Sean McCann	13,841	63.31
Total votes		21,863	100.0
Democratic hold			

61st district (Kalamazoo (Alamo Township, north Kalamazoo Township, Oshtemo Township, Parchment, Portage, Prairie Ronde Township, Texas Township))
Party	Candidate	Votes	%
Republican	Margaret O'Brien	21,917	61.59
Democratic	Thomas Batten	13,669	38.41
Total votes		35,586	100.0
Republican hold			

62nd district (Calhoun (Albion, Albion Township, Battle Creek, Burlington Township, Clarence Township, Clarendon Township, Convis Township, Eckford Township, Fredonia Township, Homer Township, Lee Township, Leroy Township, Marengo Township, Sheridan Township, Springfie
Party	Candidate	Votes	%
Democratic	Kate Segal (incumbent)	14,187	54.76
Republican	Steven Mobley	11,720	45.24
Total votes		25,907	100.0
Democratic hold			

63rd district (Calhoun (Bedford Township, Emmet Township, Fredonia Township--part, Marshall--most, Marshall Township, Newton Township, Pennfield Township), Kalamazoo (Brady Township, Charleston Township, Climax Township, Comstock Township, Galesburg, Pavilion Township,
Party	Candidate	Votes	%
Republican	Jase Bolger (incumbent)	20,931	62.78
Democratic	Dave Morgan	12,407	37.22
Total votes		33,338	100.0
Republican hold			

64th district (Jackson (Concord Township, Hanover Township, Jackson, Napoleon Township, Parma Township, Pulaski Township, Sandstone Township, Spring Arbor Township, Summit Township))
Party	Candidate	Votes	%
Republican	Earl Poleski	13,186	58.59
Democratic	Martin Griffin	9,318	41.41
Total votes		22,504	100.0
Republican gain from Democratic			

65th district (Eaton (Brookfield Township, Eaton Rapids, Hamlin Township), Jackson (Blackman Township, Columbia Township, Grass Lake Township, Henrietta Township, Leoni Township, Liberty Township, Norvell Township, Rives Township, Springport Township, Tompkins Township
Party	Candidate	Votes	%
Republican	Mike Shirkey	17,889	63.23
Democratic	Janet Rochefort	10,405	36.77
Total votes		28,294	100.0
Republican gain from Democratic			

66th district (Livingston (Brighton, Brighton Township, Genoa Township, Green Oak Township, Marion Township--part, Oceola Township), Oakland (Milford Township))
Party	Candidate	Votes	%
Republican	Bill Rogers (incumbent)	26,990	73.94
Democratic	James Delcamp	9,512	26.06
Total votes		36,502	100.0
Republican hold			

67th district (Ingham (Alaiedon Township, Aurelius Township, Bunker Hill Township, Delhi Charter Township, Ingham Township, southwest Lansing, Leroy Township, Leslie, Leslie Township, Locke Township, Mason, Onondaga Township, Stockbridge Township, Vevay Township, Wheat
Party	Candidate	Votes	%
Democratic	Barb Byrum (incumbent)	17,962	52.61
Republican	Jeff Oesterle	16,177	47.39
Total votes		34,139	100.0
Democratic hold			

68th district (Ingham (Lansing—excluding southwest portion, Lansing Township))
Party	Candidate	Votes	%
Democratic	Joan Bauer (incumbent)	18,588	72.9
Republican	Timothy Moede	6,909	27.1
Total votes		25,497	100.0
Democratic hold			

69th district (Ingham (east East Lansing, Williamston Township--most))
Party	Candidate	Votes	%
Democratic	Mark Meadows (incumbent)	16,780	61.62
Republican	Susan McGillicuddy	10,450	38.38
Total votes		27,230	100.0
Democratic hold			

70th district (Ionia (Belding, Berlin Township--small part, Ionia, Ionia Township--part, Keene Township, Orleans Township, Otisco Township), Montcalm)
Party	Candidate	Votes	%
Republican	Rick Outman	13,324	54.7
Democratic	Mike Huckleberry (incumbent)	10,487	43.05
Libertarian	Patty Hone	548	2.25
Total votes		24,359	100.0
Republican gain from Democratic			

71st district (Eaton (excluding Brookfield Township, Eaton Rapids, Hamlin Township))
Party	Candidate	Votes	%
Republican	Deb Shaughnessy	24,674	59.19
Democratic	Theresa Abed	17,014	40.81
Total votes		41,688	100.0
Republican hold			

72nd district (Kent (Caledonia Township, Cascade Township, Gaines Township, Kentwood))
Party	Candidate	Votes	%
Republican	Ken Yonker	24,800	72.9
Democratic	Brian Bosak	9,219	27.1
Total votes		34,019	100.0
Republican hold			

73rd district (Kent (Algoma Township, Cannon Township, Cedar Springs, Courtland Township, Nelson Township, Oakfield Township, Plainfield Township, Rockford, Solon Township, Sparta Township, Spencer Township, Tyrone Township))
Party	Candidate	Votes	%
Republican	Peter MacGregor	28,526	73.92
Democratic	Jerrod Roberts	10,062	26.08
Total votes		38,588	100.0
Republican hold			

74th district (Kent (Alpine Township, Grandville), Ottawa (Coopersville, Crockery Township, Georgetown Township, Polkton Township, Tallmadge Township, Wright Township))
Party	Candidate	Votes	%
Republican	David Agema (incumbent)	27,509	80.69
Democratic	Leon Chase	6,583	19.31
Total votes		34,092	100.0
Republican hold			

75th district (Kent (east Grand Rapids))
Party	Candidate	Votes	%
Democratic	Brandon Dillon	13,678	51.25
Republican	Bing Goei	13,012	48.75
Total votes		26,690	100.0
Democratic hold			

76th district (Kent (west Grand Rapids))
Party	Candidate	Votes	%
Democratic	Roy Schmidt (incumbent)	11,678	66.32
Republican	Marc Tonnemacher	5,931	33.68
Total votes		17,609	100.0
Democratic hold			

77th district (Kent (Byron Township, Wyoming))
Party	Candidate	Votes	%
Republican	Thomas Hooker	18,088	72.35
Democratic	Scott Barton	6,913	27.65
Total votes		25,001	100.0
Republican hold			

78th district (Berrien (Baroda Township, Berrien Township, Bertland Township, Buchanan, Buchanan Township, Chikaming Township, Galien Township, New Buffalo, New Buffalo Township, Niles, Niles Township, Oronoko Township, Pipestone Township, Three Oaks Township, Weesaw T
Party	Candidate	Votes	%
Republican	Sharon Tyler (incumbent)	15,218	65.35
Democratic	Cindy Ellis	8,070	34.65
Total votes		23,288	100.0
Republican hold			

79th district (Berrien (Bainbridge Township, Benton Charter Township, Benton Harbor, Bridgeman, Coloma, Coloma Township, Hager Township, Lake Charter Township, Lincoln Township, Royalton Township, Sodus Township, St. Joseph Charter Township, St. Joseph, Watervliet, Wat
Party	Candidate	Votes	%
Republican	Al Pscholka	17,291	66.38
Democratic	Mary Brown	8,757	33.62
Total votes		26,048	100.0
Republican hold			

80th district (Allegan (Otsego, Otsego Township, Watson Township), Van Buren)
Party	Candidate	Votes	%
Republican	Aric Nesbitt	15,492	64.23
Democratic	Thomas Erdmann	7,850	32.55
Independent	Cheryl Evick	778	3.23
Total votes		24,120	100.0
Republican hold			

81st district (St. Clair (Algonac, Berlin Township, Brockway Township, Casco Township, China Township, Clay Township, Clyde Township, Cottrellville Township, East China Township, Emmet Township, Grant Township, Greenwood Township, Kenockee Township, Lynn Township, Mari
Party	Candidate	Votes	%
Republican	Jud Gilbert	19,620	69.91
Democratic	Carol Morrissette	8,444	30.09
Independent	Gary R. Eisen	3,793	11.76
Total votes		32,265	100.0
Republican hold			

82nd district (Lapeer)
Party	Candidate	Votes	%
Republican	Kevin Daley (incumbent)	20,338	70.77
Democratic	Mark Monson	8,401	29.23
Total votes		28,739	100.0
Republican hold			

83rd district (Sanilac, St. Clair (Burtchville Township, Fort Gratiot Township, Port Huron))
Party	Candidate	Votes	%
Republican	Paul Muxlow	14,940	59.63
Democratic	Alan Lewandowski	10,115	40.37
Total votes		25,055	100.0
Republican gain from Democratic			

=== Districts 84–110 ===
84th district (Huron, Tuscola)
Party	Candidate	Votes	%
Republican	Kurt Damrow	15,181	50.05
Democratic	Terry Brown (incumbent)	15,153	49.95
Total votes		30,334	100.0
Republican gain from Democratic			

85th district (Clinton (Bath Township, Dewitt Township--part, Ovid Township, Victor Township, Shiawassee))
Party	Candidate	Votes	%
Republican	Ben Glardon	22,363	67.51
Democratic	Pamela Drake	10,764	32.49
Total votes		33,127	100.0
Republican hold			

86th district (Kent (Ada Township, Bowne Township, East Grand Rapids, north-central Grand Rapids, Grand Rapids Township, Grattan Township, Lowell, Lowell Township, Vergennes Township, Walker))
Party	Candidate	Votes	%
Republican	Lisa Posthumus Lyons	25,943	70.23
Democratic	Frank Hammond	10,996	29.77
Total votes		36,939	100.0
Republican hold			

87th district (Barry, Ionia (Berlin Township--most, Boston Township, Campbell Township, Danby Township, Ionia--small part, Ionia Township--most, Lyons Township, North Plains Township, Odessa Township, Orange Township, Portland, Portland Township, Ronald Township, Sebew
Party	Candidate	Votes	%
Republican	Mike Callton	22,308	71.87
Democratic	Greg Grieves	8,731	28.13
Total votes		31,039	100.0
Republican hold			

88th district (Allegan (excluding Watson Township, Otsego, Otsego Township))
Party	Candidate	Votes	%
Republican	Bob Genetski (incumbent)	23,518	73.71
Democratic	Randy Thompson	8,389	26.29
Total votes		31,907	100.0
Republican hold			

89th district (Ottawa (Allendale Township, Ferrysburg, Grand Haven, Grand Haven Township, Olive Township, Park Township, Port Sheldon Township, Robinson Township, Spring Lake Township))
Party	Candidate	Votes	%
Republican	Amanda Price	22,151	69.59
Democratic	Don Bergman	8,553	26.87
Libertarian	Terry Ashcraft	1,127	3.54
Total votes		31,831	100.0
Republican hold			

90th district (Ottawa (Blendon, Holland--part within county, Holland Township, Hudsonville, Jamestown Township, Zeeland, Zeeland Township))
Party	Candidate	Votes	%
Republican	Joe Haveman (incumbent)	24,643	100
Total votes		24,643	100.0
Republican hold			

91st district (Muskegon (Blue Lake Township, Casnovia Township, Cedar Creek Township, Dalton Township, Egelston Township, Fruitport Township, Holton Township, Montague, Montague Township, Moorland Township, Ravenna Township, Roosevelt Park, Sullivan Township, White Riv
Party	Candidate	Votes	%
Republican	Holly Hughes	16,033	55.94
Democratic	Ben Gillette	12,628	44.06
Total votes		28,661	100.0
Republican gain from Democratic			

92nd district (Muskegon (Fruitland Township, Laketon Township, Muskegon Heights, Muskegon, Muskegon Township, North Muskegon))
Party	Candidate	Votes	%
Democratic	Marcia Hovey-Wright	12,424	63.97
Republican	John McNally	6,999	36.03
Total votes		19,423	100.0
Democratic hold			

93rd district (Clinton (excluding Ovid Township, Victor Township, Bath Township, Dewitt Township--part), Gratiot)
Party	Candidate	Votes	%
Republican	Paul Opsommer (incumbent)	22,287	70.18
Democratic	Travis Lacelle	9,471	29.82
Total votes		31,758	100.0
Republican hold			

94th district (Saginaw (Albee Township, Birch Run Township, Blumfield Township, Chesaning Township, Frankenmuth, Frankenmuth Township, James Township, Maple Grove Township, Saginaw Township, St. Charles Township, Swan Creek Township, Taymouth Township, Thomas Township)
Party	Candidate	Votes	%
Republican	Ken Horn (incumbent)	24,361	69.94
Democratic	Vince Mosca	10,470	30.06
Total votes		34,831	100.0
Republican hold			

95th district (Saginaw (Bridgeport Township, Buena Vista Township, Saginaw, Spaulding Township))
Party	Candidate	Votes	%
Democratic	Stacy Erwin Oakes	13,858	71.3
Republican	Sarge Harvey	5,577	28.7
Total votes		19,435	100.0
Democratic hold			

96th district (Bay (Auburn, Bangor Township, Bay City, Beaver Township, Essexville, Frankenlust Township, Hampton Township, Merritt Township, Midland—portion within county, Monitor Township, Portsmouth Township, Williams Township))
Party	Candidate	Votes	%
Democratic	Charles Brunner	17,052	52.11
Republican	Dennis Poirier	15,668	47.89
Total votes		32,720	100.0
Democratic hold			

97th district (Arenac, Bay (Fraser Township, Garfield Township, Gibson Township, Kawkawlin Township, Mount Forest Township, Pinconning, Pinconning Township), Clare, Gladwin)
Party	Candidate	Votes	%
Republican	Joel Johnson	16,819	58.26
Democratic	Mark Lightfoot	10,657	36.92
Libertarian	Brandon Dickhausen	1,392	4.82
Total votes		28,868	100.0
Republican hold			

98th district (Midland (Homer Township, Ingersoll Township, Larkin Township—small part, Lincoln Township—small part, Midland—almost all, Midland Township, Mount Haley Township), Saginaw (Brady Township, Brant Township, Carrollton Township, Chapin Township, Fremont Town
Party	Candidate	Votes	%
Republican	Jim Stamas (incumbent)	22,119	100
Total votes		22,119	100.0
Republican hold			

99th district (Isabella, Midland (Coleman, Edenville Township, Geneva Township, Greendale Township, Hope Township, Jasper Township, Jerome Township, Larkin Township—almost all, Lee Township, Lincoln Township—almost all, Mills Township, Porter Township, Warren Township)
Party	Candidate	Votes	%
Republican	Kevin Cotter	16,647	64.4
Democratic	Toni Sessoms	9,202	35.6
Total votes		25,849	100.0
Republican hold			

100th district (Lake, Newaygo, Oceana)
Party	Candidate	Votes	%
Republican	Jon Bumstead	17,163	66.37
Democratic	Bill Richards	8,695	33.63
Total votes		25,858	100.0
Republican hold			

101st district (Benzie, Leelanau, Manistee, Mason)
Party	Candidate	Votes	%
Republican	Ray Franz	19,386	51.18
Democratic	Dan Scripps (incumbent)	18,494	48.82
Total votes		37,880	100.0
Republican gain from Democratic			

102nd district (Mecosta, Osceola, Wexford)
Party	Candidate	Votes	%
Republican	Philip Potvin	18,825	65.74
Democratic	Jodi Estes Gabert	8,471	29.58
Independent	Roy Kissinger	1,340	4.68
Total votes		28,636	100.0
Republican hold			

103rd district (Iosco, Missaukee, Ogemaw, Roscommon)
Party	Candidate	Votes	%
Republican	Bruce Rendon	19,930	62.5
Democratic	Van Sheltrown	11,958	37.5
Total votes		31,888	100.0
Republican gain from Democratic			

104th district (Grand Traverse, Kalkaska)
Party	Candidate	Votes	%
Republican	Wayne Schmidt (incumbent)	23,458	60.46
Democratic	John Scrudato	10,948	28.22
Independent	Megan Crandall	4,391	11.32
Total votes		38,797	100.0
Republican hold			

105th district (Antrim, Charlevoix, Cheboygan (excluding Koehler Township, Tuscarora Township), Otsego)
Party	Candidate	Votes	%
Republican	Greg MacMaster	25,907	70.77
Democratic	Greg Dean	10,702	29.23
Total votes		36,609	100.0
Republican hold			

106th district (Alcona, Alpena, Crawford, Montmorency, Oscoda, Presque Isle)
Party	Candidate	Votes	%
Republican	Peter Pettalia	18,096	57.74
Democratic	Casey Viegelahn	11,744	37.48
Independent	Nicholas Hein	1,498	4.78
Total votes		31,338	100.0
Republican gain from Democratic			

107th district (Cheboygan (Koehler Township, Tuscarora Township), Chippewa, Emmet, Mackinac)
Party	Candidate	Votes	%
Republican	Frank Foster	19,337	63.01
Democratic	Richard Timmer	11,350	36.99
Total votes		30,687	100.0
Republican gain from Democratic			

108th district (Delta, Dickinson, Menominee)
Party	Candidate	Votes	%
Republican	Ed McBroom	17,734	59.9
Democratic	Judy Nerat (incumbent)	11,872	40.1
Total votes		29,606	100.0
Republican gain from Democratic			

109th district (Alger, Luce, Marquette (excluding Powell Township, West Branch Township), Schoolcraft)
Party	Candidate	Votes	%
Democratic	Steven Lindberg (incumbent)	17,154	57.87
Republican	John Brock	12,490	42.13
Total votes		29,644	100.0
Democratic hold			

110th district (Baraga, Gogebic, Houghton, Iron, Keweenaw, Marquette (Powell Township), Ontonagon)
Party	Candidate	Votes	%
Republican	Matt Huuki	16,031	55.58
Democratic	Scott Dianda	12,814	44.42
Total votes		28,845	100.0
Republican gain from Democratic			

=== By-elections ===
On September 9, 2011, State Representative Tim Melton resigned to accept a position in the organization StudentsFirst, founded by Michelle Rhee. The by-election to fill the vacancy in the seat was held February 28, 2012, and was won by Tim Greimel, the current House minority leader.

29th House district by-election—February 28, 2012
Party	Candidate	Votes	%
Democratic	Tim Greimel	7,058	76.95
Republican	Bob Gray	2,114	23.05
Total votes		9,172	100.0
Democratic hold			

On November 8, 2011, State Representative Paul Scott was recalled. The by-election to fill the vacancy in the seat was held February 28, 2012, and was won by Joe Graves.

51st House district by-election—February 28, 2012
Party	Candidate	Votes	%
Republican	Joe Graves	10,290	53.41
Democratic	Steven Losey	8,173	42.42
Green	Cary Neuville-Justice	803	4.17
Total votes		19,266	100.0
Republican hold			

== See also ==
- 2010 Michigan Senate election
