= Patricia A. Lockwood =

American politician

Member of Fenton City Council
- Incumbent
- Assumed office 2012
- Preceded by: Timothy Faricy
- In office 1987–1988

Michigan Racing Commissioner (acting)
- In office – October 17, 2010
- Preceded by: Christine C. White
- Succeeded by: Office abolished

Member of the Genesee County Board of Commissioners
- In office 2007–2010
- Preceded by: Fred Shaltz
- Succeeded by: Joe Graves

Member of the Michigan House of Representatives from the 51st district
- In office January 1, 1999 – December 31, 2002
- Preceded by: Candace A. Curtis
- Succeeded by: Dave Robertson

Mayor of Fenton
- In office 1989–1998
- Succeeded by: Sue Osborn

Personal details
- Party: Democratic
- Spouse: Ronald

Patricia A. Lockwood is an American politician.

== Background ==
Lockwood went to the University of Detroit Mercy.

== Political career ==
In the 1970s, Lockwood move to Fenton just before Fenton leveled the downtown buildings. From 1987 to 1988, Lockwood was on Fenton City Council. Lockwood served as Fenton, Michigan's Mayor from 1989 to 1998. From 1998 to 2002, Lockwood served the Michigan 51st District as Representatives, as a Democrat. She then served as a State Transportation Commission Advisor. On March 18, 2004, she was appointed by Governor Jennifer Granholm to the position of Emerald Ash Borer (EAB) Policy Director. In 2006, she ran for Genesee County County Commissioner for the 6th District and won. She defeated Joseph Graves in 2008 to retain her seat on the County Board of Commissioners. Granholm appointed her acting Michigan Racing Commissioner until the office was abolished on October 17, 2010. Lockwood decided not to run for re-election for the County Commissioner, 6th District in 2010. She was elected back to the Fenton City Council on November 8, 2011.

Political offices
Preceded by Candace A. Curtis	Michigan Representatives; 51st District; 1998-2002	Succeeded by David B. Robertson
Preceded by Christine C. White	Michigan Racing Commissioner; 2009-2010	Succeeded by abolished
Preceded by Fred Shaltz	County Commissioner, 6th District; 2006-2010	Succeeded by Joseph Graves
Preceded by	Mayor of Fenton, Michigan; 1989-1998	Succeeded by Sue Osborn
