= Michigan prosecution of fake electors =

Criminal prosecution concerning Trump fake electors

Michigan v. Berden
- Court: Ingham County Circuit Court
- Full case name: People of the State of Michigan v. Kathy Berden, et al
- Docket nos.: 2022-0343234-A (district court proceedings)
- Charge: List of charges: Forgery; Conspiracy to commit forgery; Election law forgery; Conspiracy to commit election law forgery; Uttering and publishing; Conspiracy to commit uttering and publishing

People of the State of Michigan v. Berden et al. was a state criminal prosecution concerning the Trump fake electors plot in Michigan. Sixteen defendants were accused of producing and attempting to use a false certificate of ascertainment containing electoral votes for Donald Trump, who had lost the 2020 U.S. presidential election in Michigan. The defendants were indicted in July 2023 on criminal charges of forgery, uttering, and conspiracy, all felonies.

One defendant agreed to cooperate, and charges against him were dropped in October 2023. Charges were dismissed against the remaining 15 defendants in September 2025, due to the judge ruling that there was insufficient evidence of intent to commit fraud.

== Background ==
=== Planning ===
Joe Biden won Michigan's electoral votes in the 2020 U.S. presidential election by about 154,000 votes, or about three percentage points. Attempts to cause Michigan's electoral vote to be counted for Donald Trump instead were spearheaded by Rudolph Giuliani and John Eastman in support of the Trump campaign. The plan targeted seven states: Arizona, Georgia, Michigan, Nevada, New Mexico, Pennsylvania, and Wisconsin.

Initially, Giuliani in a series of hearings in December 2020 publicly urged Michigan lawmakers to award the state's electoral votes to Trump, but was unsuccessful. The Trump electoral slates were then convened anyway, using the justification that they would be alternate slates to be used in case Texas v. Pennsylvania was ruled in favor of Trump. However, that case was thrown out on December 11, 2020, three days before the electoral vote was to occur, a fact that was withheld from most of the defendants by Giuliani and Kenneth Chesebro.

=== Creation of false electoral documents ===
Michigan Republican Party chair Laura Cox said that according to an unnamed Trump campaign lawyer, the initial plan was to have electors hide overnight in the Michigan State Capitol, but she opposed that plan. The defendants instead met in the basement of the state Republican Party headquarters on December 14, 2020. Two members of the nominated Republican electoral slate — one of whom was former Michigan Secretary of State Terri Lynn Land — did not attend, and were replaced. A Trump campaign aide was present as well, according to one of the defendants.

The participants' level of involvement in the scheme varied. False elector Meshawn Maddock and her husband, state representative Matt Maddock, had long-standing ties to Trump and were in direct contact with Trump campaign officials. On the other hand, false elector Michele Lundgren told reporters that she had received a call to participate only the previous day and thought the document was a sign-in sheet.

They produced and signed multiple documents falsely stating they were the duly elected and qualified electors in the 2020 U.S. presidential election, and that they had placed electoral votes for Donald Trump. Unlike in some other states, the Michigan false certificate of ascertainment did not contain language specifying it was to be used only if the Trump campaign prevailed in litigation, and at the time, all court challenges in Michigan had already been resolved. The documents were then sent to the U.S. Senate and National Archives, as well as the Office of the Federal Register, Michigan Secretary of State Jocelyn Benson, and the federal U.S. District Court for the Western District of Michigan.

External videos
- Republicans try to deliver their own electoral votes to Michigan Capitol—Detroit Free Press

Four defendants later that day attempted to enter the Michigan State Capitol with State Representative Daire Rendon, appearing to present the falsified certificate to gain entry into the building and claiming to be true electors, but they were turned away by the Michigan State Police due to COVID-19 pandemic restrictions preventing anyone without official business from entering.

=== Subsequent events ===
In March 2021, the watchdog group American Oversight posted copies of the false documents from several states, including Michigan, obtained from the National Archives via a freedom of information request. However, the documents were largely overlooked until the story was reported by Politico in January 2022.

Michigan Attorney General Dana Nessel began an investigation in 2021. In January 2022, she publicly confirmed the state investigation but closed it in favor of asking the federal Department of Justice to open a criminal investigation, citing jurisdictional issues. However, Nessel announced in January 2023 that she was reopening the state investigation due to perceived inaction from the federal investigation on the matter.

Two of the defendants, Kathy Berden and Mayra Rodriguez, along with a lawyer who tried to deliver the fraudulent certificates of ascertainment, were subpoenaed by the U.S. House Select Committee on the January 6 Attack in June 2022. Both testified before the committee, but largely avoided responding to questions by pleading the Fifth.

In January 2023, three of the lawful Michigan electors filed a civil lawsuit against the false electors in Kent County Circuit Court.

== Proceedings ==
Michigan Attorney General Dana Nessel filed the charges on July 18, 2023. All defendants were charged with the following eight felonies:

- Forgery (two counts) and conspiracy to commit forgery (one count)
- Election law forgery (two counts) and conspiracy to commit election law forgery (one count)
- Uttering and publishing (one count) and conspiracy to commit uttering and publishing (one count)

In cases where there are two counts, they are for two documents relating to the presidential and vice-presidential elections.

=== Defendants ===
All 16 signers of the false documents were charged:

- Kent Vanderwood (Wyoming mayor)
- Stanley Grot (Shelby Township clerk)
- Amy Facchinello (Grand Blanc Community Schools board member)
- Kathy Berden (Republican National Committee delegate from Michigan)
- Meshawn Maddock (later Michigan Republican Party co-chair)
- Marian Sheridan (Michigan Republican Party grassroots vice chair)
- Mari-Ann Henry (7th congressional district Republican Committee treasurer)
- Rose Rook (Van Buren County Republicans executive committee member)
- William "Hank" Choate
- Clifford Frost
- John Haggard
- Timothy King
- Michele Lundgren
- James Renner
- Mayra Rodriguez
- Ken Thompson

The arraignments were held in the 54-A District Court in Ingham County. All 16 of the defendants had been arraigned by August 10, 2023, and all pleaded not guilty.

Nessel's office disclosed during an April 2024 court hearing that Trump, Mark Meadows, Rudy Giuliani and Jenna Ellis were unindicted co-conspirators.

=== Preliminary hearings ===
Probable cause hearings are required before the cases are transferred to the 30th Judicial Circuit Court for trial. Several preliminary hearings were scheduled for dates ranging from September 2023 through January 2024.

On October 19, 2023, the Attorney General's office announced that it was dropping charges against James Renner in exchange for a cooperation agreement. The other 15 defendants continued to face charges.

The defendants were split into two groups for the hearings. In February 2024, a preliminary hearing was held for six of the defendants, with Renner and others testifying. A hearing for another six defendants was held in May and June 2024, with three remaining defendants expected to have their hearings at a later date. The judge's decision on whether to send the defendants to trial was expected to occur only after all defendants' preliminary hearings are completed.

On April 24, 2024, at a pretrial hearing for the case, Michigan's Special agent Howard Shock was asked to confirm if other individuals were co-conspirators in the case. He answered "Yes" to the following names: Donald Trump, Mark Meadows, Rudy Giuliani and Jenna Ellis. According to the news report, Michigan Attorney General Dana Nessel, did not provide a comment about the revelation. On May 31, 2024, Shock said he was still seeking information through subpoenas or search warrants and that the probe was "open and active".

=== Dismissal ===
On September 9, 2025, 54-A District Court Judge Kristen D. Simmons dismissed the charges against all 15 remaining defendants. She found that the prosecution had not presented enough evidence that the defendants had intention to commit fraud, as opposed to the ringleaders of the plot, who had not themselves been indicted. Testimony from Renner was key in the judge reaching the ruling. The prosecution was reported to be considering an appeal of the dismissal. John Haggard, one of the electors, died hours after the ruling.
