= Silverwood, Michigan =

- Unincorporated community
- Location in Michigan Location in the United States
- Coordinates: 43°19′24″N 83°14′53″W
- Country: United States
- State: Michigan
- Counties: Lapeer, Tuscola
- Townships: Rich, Dayton
- platted: July 19, 1899

Government
  - Type: none
- Elevation: 804 ft (245 m)

Population
  - Total: 1,342
- Time zone: UTC-5 (Eastern (EST))
  - Summer (DST): UTC-4 (EDT)
- ZIP codes: 48760
- GNIS feature ID: 637970

Silverwood is an unincorporated community on the border of Rich Township, Lapeer County and Dayton Township, Tuscola County in Michigan at 43°19′24″N 83°14′53″W.

== History ==
When the narrow gauge Port Huron and Northwestern Railway was built through here in 1882, the residents applied for a post office. One suggested naming it something easy to remember, and the post office named "Easy" opened on 13 April 1882, with James R. Chapin as the first postmaster. The name changed to "Rollo" on 27 March 1890, and changed again on 2 May 1892 to "Silverwood", after the nearby stands of white pine. A subdivision plat for the Village of Silverwood was filed on 19 July 1899. The Pere Marquette Railroad purchased the Port Huron and Northwestern Railway and changed its rails to standard gauge.

== Government ==
Silverwood as an unincorporated community has no government of its own, so is governed by whichever township that part of the community is within. Silverwood is served by the Mayville Community School District as well as other nearby school districts. The Silverwood-based post office, with ZIP code 48760, also serves the northeast portion of Rich Township, as well as the southeast portion of Dayton Township, and small areas in Koylton Township in Tuscola County, and Burlington Township in Lapeer County.

District	Number	Officeholder
U.S. Representative	5	Dale E. Kildee
U.S. Representative	10	Candice Miller
State Senate	31	James A. Barcia
State Representative	82	Kevin Daley
State Representative	84	Kurt Damrow
Lapeer County Commissioner	2	Dyle Henning
Tuscola County Commissioner	3	Tom Kern
