= Alma Smith =

Alma Smith may refer to:

- Alma Wheeler Smith (born 1941), American politician
- Alma Genevieve Smith, married name of Alma Rubens (1897–1931), American film actress
