= Ruth Ann Jamnick =

American politician (born 1941)

Member of the State Boundary Commission
- In office November 18, 2005 – November 15, 2013
- Preceded by: Jeffrey Ishbia
- Succeeded by: Dennis L. Schornack

Ypsilanti Charter Township Supervisor
- In office November 20, 2004 – November 20, 2008
- Preceded by: Karen Lovejoy Roe
- Succeeded by: Brenda Stumbo

Member of the Michigan House of Representatives from the 54th district
- In office January 1, 1999 – December 31, 2004
- Preceded by: Kirk Profit
- Succeeded by: Alma Wheeler Smith

Ypsilanti Charter Township Treasurer
- In office 1976–1998

Personal details
- Born: November 8, 1941 (age 84) Ypsilanti, Michigan
- Party: Democratic

Ruth Ann Jamnick (born November 8, 1941) was a Democratic member of the Michigan House of Representatives. Prior to her election to the House, Jamnick served 22 years as the Ypsilanti Township Treasurer, and she served one term as that township's supervisor following her time in the House.

Jamnick also served as a member of the State Boundary Commission from 2005 to 2013. She was also a member of the Washtenaw County chapter of the Michigan Townships Association and as the association's second vice president. Jamnick was the Ypsilanti Township delegate to the Southeast Michigan Council of Governments (SEMCOG), and is a past chair of the Washtenaw County United Way.
