= Edward J. Canfield =

American politician (born 1955)

Edward J. Canfield D.O.

Member of the Michigan House of Representatives from the 84th district
- In office January 1, 2015 – December 31, 2018
- Preceded by: Terry Brown
- Succeeded by: Phil Green

Personal details
- Born: November 6, 1955 (age 70) Howell, Michigan
- Party: Republican
- Spouse: Cheryl
- Education: Michigan State University (D.O.); Lake Superior State College (B.S.)

Military service
- Branch: United States Navy
- Service years: 1975–1980
- Rank: Petty officer, first class

Edward J. "Ned" Canfield (born November 6, 1955) is a former Republican member of the Michigan House of Representatives for Tuscola and Huron counties.

== Biography ==
Canfield was born in Howell in November 1955 and raised on his family's farm in Fowlerville. Canfield graduated from high school in 1973 and enlisted in the United States Navy two years later. After five years as a hospital corpsman, Canfield was honorably discharged.

He earned a degree in biological sciences from what was then Lake Superior State College (now-University) in 1983 and graduated from Michigan State University with a doctorate in osteopathic medicine in 1988. Canfield practiced medicine in Lansing from 1989 to 1992, then opened a family practice in Sebewaing with his wife which he sold to Covenant Healthcare in 2010. He currently is a family physician in Caro.

Canfield previously ran as an independent for the House in 2012 and lost.
