= Linden High School (Michigan) =

Location
- 7201 Silver Lake Road; Linden, Michigan 48451; United States; 42°48′31″N 83°48′51″W

Information
- Type: Public High School
- Established: 1896
- School district: Linden Community Schools
- Superintendent: Russ Ciesielski
- Principal: Darin Dreasky
- Teaching staff: 39.92 (on an FTE basis)
- Grades: 9–12
- Enrollment: 827 (2023-2024)
- Student to teacher ratio: 20.72
- Colors: Red, white, and black
- Athletics conference: Flint Metro League
- Nickname: Eagles
- Rival: Fenton High School
- Website: highschool.lindenschools.org

Linden High School, a grade 9-12 high school in the Linden Community School District, is located west of Linden, Michigan.

== Demographics ==
The demographic breakdown of the 942 students enrolled in 2015-16 was:

- Male - 53.8%
- Female - 46.2%
- Native American/Alaskan - 0.2%
- Asian/Pacific islanders - 0.5%
- Black - 0.3%
- Hispanic - 3.1%
- White - 94.8%
- Multiracial - 1.1%

18.8% of the students were eligible for free or reduced-cost lunch.

== Athletics ==
The Linden Eagles compete in the Flint Metro League. The school colors are red, black and white. The following Michigan High School Athletic Association (MHSAA) sports are offered:

- Baseball (boys)
- Basketball (girls and boys)
- Bowling (girls and boys)
- Competitive cheer (girls)
- Cross country (girls and boys)
  - Boys state championship - 2008
- Football (boys)
- Golf (girls and boys)
- Gymnastics (girls)
- Ice hockey (boys)
- Lacrosse (girls and boys)
- Skiing (girls and boys)
- Soccer (girls and boys)
- Softball (girls)
- Swim and dive (girls)l
- Track and field (girls and boys)
- Volleyball (girls)
- Wrestling (boys)

== Notable alumni ==
- Mike Mueller (Class of 1992), member of the Michigan House of Representatives (2019–present)
