= Sarah Pounds =

American politician

Member-elect of the Michigan House of Representatives from the 54th district
- Assuming office January 1, 2027
- Succeeding: Donni Steele

Personal details
- Party: Democratic
- Education: Oakland University
- Website: Campaign website

Sarah Pounds is an American politician who is the member-elect for the 54th district of the Michigan House of Representatives. She was elected at the 2026 election.
