= David B. Robertson =

American politician

Dave Robertson

Member of the Michigan Senate
- In office January 1, 2011 – January 1, 2019
- Preceded by: Deborah Cherry
- Succeeded by: Ruth Johnson
- Constituency: 26th district (2011–2014); 14th district (2015–2019)

Member of the Michigan House of Representatives from the 51st district
- In office January 1, 2003 – December 31, 2008
- Preceded by: Patricia A. Lockwood
- Succeeded by: Paul H. Scott

Member of the Michigan House of Representatives from the 83rd district
- In office January 1, 1991 – December 31, 1992
- Preceded by: Kay Hart
- Succeeded by: Kim Rhead

Personal details
- Born: June 24, 1960 (age 66)
- Party: Republican
- Education: University of Michigan, Flint (BA)

David B. Robertson is a former Michigan State Senator, representing the 14th district (formerly numbered as the 26th) from 2011 until 2019. He is a statutory member of the Genesee County Republican Party's executive committee.

== Political career ==
In 2008, Robertson was term limited from serving additional terms in the Michigan State House and was succeeded by Paul H. Scott. In 2010, Robertson beat Democrat Paula Zelenko to win 26th senatorial district as the first Republican State Senator from Genesee County since 1974. The result was Robertson 45,360, Zelenko 33,769 votes.

Michigan House of Representatives
| Preceded by Kay Hart | Member of the Michigan House of Representatives from the 83rd district 1991–1993 | Succeeded by Kim Rhead |
| Preceded by Patricia A. Lockwood | Member of the Michigan House of Representatives from the 51st district 2003–2009 | Succeeded by Paul H. Scott |
Michigan Senate
| Preceded by Deborah Cherry | Member of the Michigan Senate from the 26th district 2011–2015 | Succeeded by Tonya Schuitmaker |
| Preceded by Vincent Gregory | Member of the Michigan Senate from the 14th district 2015–2019 | Succeeded by Ruth Johnson |
