= Kirk Profit =

American politician and lawyer (born 1952)

Member of the Michigan House of Representatives
- In office January 1, 1989 – December 31, 1998
- Preceded by: Gary Owen
- Succeeded by: Ruth Ann Jamnick
- Constituency: 22nd district (1989–1992); 54th district (1993–1998)

Personal details
- Born: September 12, 1952 (age 74) Mount Pleasant, Michigan
- Education: University of Detroit Mercy School of Law (J.D.); Eastern Michigan University (B.S.)

Kirk Profit (born September 12, 1952) is a former member of the Michigan House of Representatives who now works as a lawyer as President of Profit Legal Services, PLLC.

During his time in the House, Profit chaired the Tax Policy and Higher Education Committees. He is also a former legal adviser and undersheriff in the Washtenaw County Sheriff's Department. Profit was an adjunct professor at Eastern Michigan University.

Michigan House of Representatives
Preceded by Gary Owen	Member of the Michigan House of Representatives from the 22nd district 1989–1993	Succeeded by Gregory E. Pitoniak
Preceded by Paul Hillegonds	Member of the Michigan House of Representatives from the 54th district 1993–1999	Succeeded by Ruth Ann Jamnick
