= Terry Brown (Michigan politician) =

American politician (born 1959)

The Honorable Terry L. Brown

Member of the Michigan House of Representatives from the 84th district
- In office January 1, 2013 – December 31, 2014
- Preceded by: Kurt Damrow
- Succeeded by: Edward J. Canfield
- In office January 1, 2007 – December 31, 2010
- Preceded by: Tom Meyer
- Succeeded by: Kurt Damrow

Personal details
- Born: May 15, 1959 (age 67) Pigeon, Michigan, U.S.
- Party: Democrat
- Spouse: Carol
- Children: Teresa, Chris, Bryan

Terry L. Brown (born May 15, 1959) is an American politician who was a member of the Michigan House of Representatives, first elected in 2006, re-elected in 2008, defeated in 2010, and returned for a third and final term in 2012.
