= Ronnie Peterson (politician) =

American politician (born 1952)

Member of the Michigan House of Representatives from the 54th district
- In office January 1, 2017 – January 1, 2023
- Preceded by: David E. Rutledge
- Succeeded by: Donni Steele

Personal details
- Born: July 7, 1952 (age 74) Ypsilanti, Michigan, U.S.
- Party: Democratic

Ronnie D. Peterson (born July 7, 1952) is an American Democratic politician who served in the Michigan House of Representatives from the 54th district from 2017 to 2023. Ronnie is a former Washtenaw County Commissioner and Ypsilanti City Council Member.
