= Rich Township, Michigan =

- Civil township
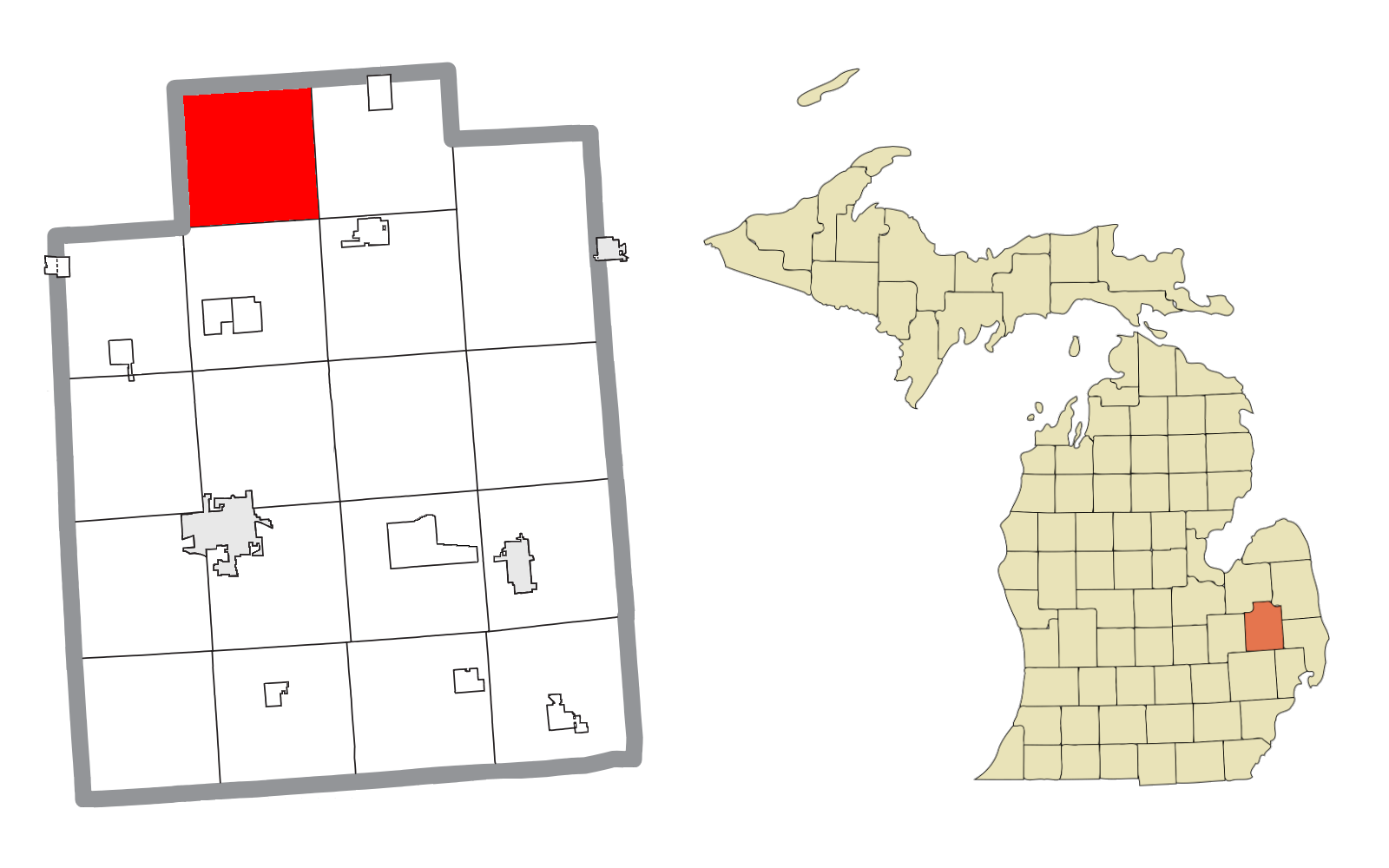
- Location within Lapeer County

- Location within the state of Michigan Location within the United States
- Coordinates: 43°16′45″N 83°17′48″W
- Country: United States
- State: Michigan
- County: Lapeer

Area
  - Total: 35.3 sq mi (91.5 km^{2})
  - Land: 35.3 sq mi (91.3 km^{2})
  - Water: 0.12 sq mi (0.3 km^{2})
- Elevation: 778 ft (237 m)

Population (2020)
  - Total: 1,500
  - Density: 43/sq mi (16/km^{2})
- Time zone: UTC-5 (Eastern (EST))
  - Summer (DST): UTC-4 (EDT)
- ZIP codes: 48744 (Mayville), 48760 (Silverwood), 48435 (Fostoria), 48461 (North Branch)
- FIPS code: 26-68160
- GNIS feature ID: 1626967
- Website: https://www.richtownshipmi.com/

Rich Township is a civil township of Lapeer County in the U.S. state of Michigan. The population was 1,500 at the 2020 Census.

== Communities ==
- Silverwood is an unincorporated community in the northeast corner of the township. at 43°19′24″N 83°14′53″W on the boundary with Dayton Township in Tuscola County to the north.
- The village of Mayville is to the northwest in Tuscola County, and the Mayville post office, with ZIP code 48744, also serves the northwest portion of Rich Township.
- The community of Fostoria is to the west in Watertown Township in Tuscola County, and the Fostoria post office, with ZIP code 48435, also serves the southwest portion of Rich Township.
- The village of North Branch is to the southeast, and the North Branch post office, with ZIP code 48461, also serves the southeast portion of Rich Township.

== Geography ==
According to the United States Census Bureau, the township has a total area of 35.3 square miles (91 km^{2}), of which 35.2 square miles (91 km^{2}) is land and 0.1 square miles (0.26 km^{2}) (0.28%) is water.

== Demographics ==
As of the census of 2000, there were 1,412 people, 489 households, and 397 families residing in the township. The population density was 40.1 inhabitants per square mile (15.5/km^{2}). There were 514 housing units at an average density of 14.6 per square mile (5.6/km^{2}). The racial makeup of the township was 97.80% White, 0.14% African American, 0.85% Native American, 0.07% Asian, and 1.13% from two or more races. Hispanic or Latino of any race were 0.71% of the population.

There were 489 households, out of which 36.4% had children under the age of 18 living with them, 70.1% were married couples living together, 5.5% had a female householder with no husband present, and 18.8% were non-families. 15.3% of all households were made up of individuals, and 5.7% had someone living alone who was 65 years of age or older. The average household size was 2.87 and the average family size was 3.17.

In the township the population was spread out, with 28.8% under the age of 18, 6.4% from 18 to 24, 30.9% from 25 to 44, 22.7% from 45 to 64, and 11.3% who were 65 years of age or older. The median age was 37 years. For every 100 females, there were 102.9 males. For every 100 females age 18 and over, there were 100.8 males.

The median income for a household in the township was $47,212, and the median income for a family was $49,375. Males had a median income of $39,732 versus $22,102 for females. The per capita income for the township was $19,968. About 1.8% of families and 5.5% of the population were below the poverty line, including 1.7% of those under age 18 and 10.3% of those age 65 or over.
