= Tom Meyer (politician) =

American politician

Member of the Michigan House of Representatives from the 84th district
- In office January 1, 2001 – December 31, 2006
- Preceded by: Mike Green
- Succeeded by: Terry Brown

Personal details
- Born: March 9, 1942 Zeeland, Michigan, US
- Died: July 9, 2007 (aged 65) Bad Axe, Michigan, US
- Party: Republican
- Spouse: Dorothian

Tom Meyer (March 9, 1942 – July 9, 2007) was a Republican member of the Michigan House of Representatives from 2001-2006 representing Tuscola and Huron counties.

Prior to his election to the House, Meyer was in the radio industry for nearly four decades, including as a station manager for Thumb Broadcasting for 30 years. When he was a child at his parents' home in Grand Rapids, he started a radio station with a friend that broadcast over an area of two blocks; that station was shut down by the Federal Communications Commission for lack of a license. Meyer later worked at WLAV, WOWE, WHTC, and WLEW. He enjoyed announcing high school sporting events.

Meyer volunteered with the Michigan Special Olympics for 15 years, was president of the Elkton Rotary Club, president of the board of Thumb Industries, and a member of the Huron County council for Michigan State University Extension. He was also a member of the Davenport University Board of Trustees.

Meyer died on July 9, 2007, aged 65, of natural causes in Bad Axe, Michigan where he lived.
