= Mike Mueller =

American politician

Member of the Michigan House of Representatives
- Incumbent
- Assumed office January 1, 2019
- Preceded by: Joe Graves
- Constituency: 51st district (2019–2022); 72nd district (2023–present)

Personal details
- Born: September 30, 1974 (age 52) Linden, Michigan, U.S.
- Party: Republican
- Education: Eastern Michigan University

Military service
- Branch: United States Navy
- Service years: 1993–1997

Michael Charles Mueller (born September 30, 1974) is a Republican member of the Michigan House of Representatives.

== Early life ==
Mueller was born on September 30, 1974, in Linden, Michigan. Mueller graduated from Linden High School in 1992. He served in the United States Navy from 1993 to 1997. In 1999, Mueller earned a BS in criminology from Eastern Michigan University. Mueller then graduated from police academy.

== Career ==
Mueller was employed as sheriff deputy in Livingston County and Washtenaw County, beginning in 2000. Mueller also owned Mueller’s Orchard and Cider Mill, a family business, and operated Birchview Outdoor Wedding & Event Center.

Mueller entered politics in 2018, when he began his campaign for Michigan state representative in the 51st district, to fill the seat of the term limited State Representative Joseph Graves. Mueller campaigned on auto insurance reform and reducing taxes for retirees. He faced a four way challenge in the Republican primary. Drew Shapiro, who had served as Genesee County commissioner, was the only one in the primary who had previous experience in elected office. The other candidates were Matthew Anderton and Ian Shetron. Before the primary election, a political action committee called the Michigan Freedom Network, which endorsed Mueller's candidacy, made a website featuring references Shapiro's criminal record, including marijuana possession and domestic violence, as well as his mugshot. Mueller claimed his campaign was not involved with the Michigan Freedom Network's website. Mueller ultimately won the primary with 65% of the vote, with Shapiro in second place.

After winning the Republican nomination, Mueller faced the Democratic nominee David Lossing in the general election. Lossing previously served as mayor of Linden, and had also worked as an adjunct professor for the University of Michigan in Ann Arbor and Flint. Mueller's won the November 6 election with 62% of the vote. On November 28, while state representative-elect, shortly before retiring as Livingston County deputy sheriff, Mueller was patrolling Tyrone Township, when another vehicle struck his patrol car. Mueller testified in June 2019 that the driver, Alfred Smith, then attempted to flee, with Mueller eventually catching up to Smith and getting into a scuffle with him.

In Mueller's first term, he served on the following legislative committees: Agriculture, Health Policy, and Energy. He also serve as vice chair of the Committee on Military, Veterans' Affairs and Homeland Security. As vice chair of said committee, in April 2019, Mueller voted with the rest of the Republicans in the committee to pass two bills which sought to ban sanctuary cities in Michigan, which was criticized by the American Civil Liberties Union as well as the sheriff's departments of Ingham County and Washtenaw County. Later in his first term, in March 2020, Mueller introduced bill which sought to ban excessively increasing the price of temporary accommodations in during emergencies, with Democratic State Senator Jeremy Moss proposing a Senate counterpart bill.

In 2020, Mueller was unopposed in the Republican primary. In the general election, he faced Democratic nominee Brad May. May was a mental health clinician who dealt with both general mental health and substance abuse. In October 2020, it was revealed by the Michigan Republican Party that May had a criminal history, including robbery and drug use, which May confirmed had been in response to the death of his daughter. Mueller defeated May in the November general election with 64% of the vote.

In his second term, Mueller served on the following legislative committees: Regulatory Reform, Judiciary, Health Policy, and Government Operations. Mueller serves as the Chair of the Committee on Government Operations and the Majority Vice-chair of the Committee on Judiciary. In March 2021, Mueller collaborated with Democratic State Representative Mari Manoogian and Republican State Representative Joe Bellino to introduce a set of three bills banning hand-based cellphone usage while driving. Specifically, the bills banned the use of social media while driving, as previous laws only prevented texting. Mueller explained that the bills would not stop all distracted driving, but says that they will “give closure to some of the victims that have been killed by people who have done it.” In June 2021, Mueller joined a bipartisan coalition of state legislators to introduce a package of four bills designed to increase the legal ramifications for drive-by shootings, in response to the murder of 3-year-old Messiah Williams.

In December 2021, the state house passed a spending bill of $368.5 million for public safety and police funding, an increase from the $80 million plan proposed earlier in May. A sponsor of the bill, Mueller cited the 2021 Oxford High School shooting as a reason for increased funding. Mueller was named one of the 2021 "Legislators of the Year" by the Police Officers Association of Michigan for securing funding for the police, and received similar awards from the Michigan Association of Chiefs of Police. In May 2022, Mueller proposed a bill, which would allow $10 million to be a located to creating critical incident mapping, with the use of satellite imagery, of every private and public school in Michigan for first responders, including police and medical staff, to use during emergencies. The bill passed through the state house unanimously in June 2022.

In the 2022 Republican primary, redistricting moved Mueller from the 51st district to the 72nd district. On August 2, Mueller won a three-way primary election against Dylan Pescarolo in second place and Brandy Bush. In November 2022, Mueller defeated Stacy Taylor of Holly Township. Mueller received 58.1% of the vote.

He was reelected in 2024.

== Personal life ==
Sometime after 2015, Mueller married Angela Acox. Together, they have four children.

Political offices
| Preceded by Joe Graves | Michigan Representatives; 51st District; 2019–2022 | Succeeded by Matt Maddock |
| Preceded by Steve Johnson | Michigan Representatives; 72nd District; 2023–present | Succeeded by Incumbent |
