= Candace A. Curtis =

American politician (born 1955)

Member of the Michigan House of Representatives from the 51st district
- In office January 1, 1993 – December 31, 1998
- Preceded by: Susan Grimes Munsell
- Succeeded by: Patricia A. Lockwood

Personal details
- Born: September 25, 1955 (age 70)
- Party: Democratic
- Spouse: Michael Curtis
- Children: 1
- Education: Michigan State University

Candace A. Curtis (born September 25, 1955) was a Michigan politician.

== Early life ==
Curtis was born on September 25, 1955.

== Education ==
Curtis graduated from Grand Blanc High School. In 1982, Curtis earned a B.A. in communications from Michigan State University.

== Career ==
Curtis at some point served as Genesee County commissioner, representing the 6th District. On November 3, 1992, Curtis was elected to the Michigan House of Representatives where she represented the 51st district from January 13, 1993 to December 31, 1998. In 2006, Curtis was an unsuccessful candidate in the Democratic primary for the Michigan Senate seat representing the 27th district.

== Personal life ==
Candace Curtis married Michael Curtis and had one son. Candace is Methodist.
