= Michigan's 84th House of Representatives district =

American legislative district

Michigan's 84th State House of Representatives district
Representative
| Carol Glanville; D–Walker |
- Demographics: 76% White; 6.9% Black; 10.2% Hispanic; 2.6% Asian; 0.2% Native American; 0.5% Other; 3.8% Multiracial
- Population (2024): 90,758

Michigan's 84th House of Representatives district (also referred to as Michigan's 84th House district) is a legislative district within the Michigan House of Representatives located in part of Kent County. The district was created in 1965, when the Michigan House of Representatives district naming scheme changed from a county-based system to a numerical one.

== List of representatives ==
| Representative | Party | Dates | Residence | Notes |
|---|---|---|---|---|
| Harry E. Rohlfs | Republican | 1965–1970 | Akron | |
| Robert D. Young | Republican | 1971–1972 | Saginaw | |
| Loren S. Armbruster | Republican | 1973–1982 | Caro | |
| John G. Strand | Republican | 1983–1992 | Lapeer | |
| Dick Allen | Republican | 1993–1994 | Caro | |
| Mike Green | Republican | 1995–2000 | Mayville | |
| Tom Meyer | Republican | 2001–2006 | Bad Axe | |
| Terry Brown | Democratic | 2007–2010 | Pigeon | |
| Kurt Damrow | Republican | 2011–2012 | Port Austin | |
| Terry Brown | Democratic | 2013–2014 | Pigeon | |
| Edward J. Canfield | Republican | 2015–2018 | Sebewaing | |
| Phil Green | Republican | 2019–2022 | Millington | |
| Carol Glanville | Democratic | 2023–present | Walker | Lived in Grand Rapids until around 2024. |
| Khristian Silvis | Democratic | (Note: Member-elect.) | Grand Rapids | |

== Recent elections ==
=== 2020s ===
2026 Michigan House of Representatives election
| Party | Candidate | Votes | % |
|---|---|---|---|
| Democratic | Khristian Silvis | 26,499 | 60.48 |
| Republican | Drew Jake Robbins | 17,315 | 39.52 |
| Total votes | | 43,814 | 100 |
| Democratic hold | | | |

2018 Michigan House of Representatives election
| Party | Candidate | Votes | % |
|---|---|---|---|
| Republican | Phil Green | 23,217 | 67.04 |
| Democratic | William Shoop | 11,417 | 32.96 |
| Total votes | | 34,634 | 100 |
| Republican hold | | | |

2016 Michigan House of Representatives election
| Party | Candidate | Votes | % |
|---|---|---|---|
| Republican | Edward J. Canfield | 26,142 | 65.04% |
| Democratic | James L. Wencel | 14,026 | 34.90% |
| Write-in | Chuck Stadler | 26 | 0.06% |
| Total votes | | 40,194 | 100.00% |
| Republican hold | | | |

2014 Michigan House of Representatives election
| Party | Candidate | Votes | % |
|---|---|---|---|
| Republican | Edward J. Canfield | 16,617 | 59.35 |
| Democratic | David Jaroch | 11,379 | 40.65 |
| Total votes | | 27,996 | 100.0 |
| Republican gain from Democratic | | | |

2012 Michigan House of Representatives election
| Party | Candidate | Votes | % |
|---|---|---|---|
| Democratic | Terry Brown | 21,345 | 52.61 |
| Republican | Dan Grimshaw | 15,480 | 38.15 |
| Independent | Edward J. Canfield | 3,748 | 9.24 |
| Total votes | | 40,573 | 100.0 |
| Democratic gain from Republican | | | |

2010 Michigan House of Representatives election
| Party | Candidate | Votes | % |
|---|---|---|---|
| Republican | Kurt Damrow | 15,181 | 50.05 |
| Democratic | Terry Brown | 15,153 | 49.95 |
| Total votes | | 30,334 | 100.0 |
| Republican gain from Democratic | | | |

2008 Michigan House of Representatives election
| Party | Candidate | Votes | % |
|---|---|---|---|
| Democratic | Terry Brown | 28,191 | 64.79 |
| Republican | Anna Kabot | 15,320 | 35.21 |
| Total votes | | 43,511 | 100.0 |
| Democratic hold | | | |

== Historical district boundaries ==
| Map | Description | Apportionment Plan | Notes |
|---|---|---|---|
| | Saginaw County (part): Albee Township; Birch Run Township; Blumfield Township; Brady Township; Brant Township; Bridgeport Township; Chapin Township; Chesaning Township; Frankenmuth; Frankenmuth Township; Fremont Township; James Township; Jonesfield Township; Lakefield Township; Maple Grove Township; Marion Township; Richland Township; Spaulding Township; St. Charles Township; Swan Creek Township; Taymouth Township; Tuscola County (part): Akron Township; Arbela Township; Denmark Township; Fairgrove Township; Gilford Township; Indianfields Township; Juniata Township; Tuscola Township; Vassar; Vassar Township; Wisner Township | 1964 Apportionment Plan | |
| | Genesee County (part): Clio; Forest Township; Montrose Township; Thetford Township; Vienna Township (part); Saginaw County (part): Frankenmuth; Frankenmuth Township; Tuscola County (part) | 1972 Apportionment Plan | |
| | Lapeer County Tuscola County (part): Arbela Township; Millington Township; Watertown Township | 1982 Apportionment Plan | |
| | Huron County Tuscola County | 1992 Apportionment Plan | |
| | Huron County Tuscola County | 2001 Apportionment Plan | |
| | Huron County Tuscola County | 2011 Apportionment Plan | |
