= Phil Green (politician) =

American politician

Member of the Michigan House of Representatives
- Incumbent
- Assumed office January 1, 2019
- Preceded by: Edward J. Canfield
- Constituency: 84th district (2019–2022); 67th district (2023– )

Personal details
- Born: Phillip A. Green; June 11, 1977 (age 49) Michigan, U.S.
- Party: Republican
- Spouse: Marun Padgett Green
- Children: 3
- Education: Pensacola Christian College

Phil Green is an American politician from Michigan. Green is a Republican member of Michigan House of Representatives from District 67.

== Education ==
In 1999, Green earned a BS degree in Bible/Biblical Studies from Pensacola Christian College. In 2009, Green earned a MA degree in Biblical Exposition from Pensacola Theological Seminary.

== Career ==
Green was a pastor and a chaplain. In 2012, Green became a school administrator.

On November 6, 2018, Green won the election and became a Republican member of the Michigan House of Representatives for District 84. Green defeated William Shoot with 67.04% of the votes.

Following redistricting, Green ran in the 67th district in 2022, winning reelection. He was reelected in 2024.

== Personal life ==
Green's wife is Marun. In 2012, Green moved back to Michigan. Green lives in Millington, Michigan.

== Electoral history ==
=== 2022 ===
Michigan House of Representatives District 67, 2022
Party	Candidate	Votes	%
Republican	Phil Green	25,403	60.5%
Democratic	Brian LaJoie	16,571	39.5%
Total votes		41,974	

=== 2018 ===
Michigan House of Representatives District 84, 2018
Party	Candidate	Votes	%
Republican	Phil Green	23,217	67.04%
Democratic	William Shoop	11,417	32.96%
Total votes		34,634	

== See also ==
- 2018 Michigan House of Representatives election
