= Donni Steele =

American politician from Michigan

Member of the Michigan House of Representatives from the 54th district
- Incumbent
- Assumed office January 1, 2021
- Preceded by: Ronnie Peterson
- Succeeded by: Sarah Pounds (elect)

Personal details
- Born: Oakland County, Michigan U.S.
- Party: Republican
- Education: Western Michigan University

Donni Steele is an American politician serving as a member of the Michigan House of Representatives since 2021, currently representing the 54th district. She is a member of the Republican Party.

== Political career ==
Steele was first elected in the 2022 election. She was reelected in 2024. In 2025, she filed to run for the Michigan Senate in the 23rd district in 2026.
