= Meshawn Maddock =

American politician

Meshawn Maddock (née Engdahl) is an American politician in the Republican Party who served as co-chair of the Michigan Republican Party from 2021 to 2023 along with Chair Ronald Weiser. Previously, she was Chair of the 11th Congressional District for the Michigan Republican Party. She is married to Republican Michigan State Representative Matt Maddock. Maddock was charged with fraud in regards to her role as a fake elector for Donald Trump in the 2020 election.

== Professional history ==
Maddock and her family run A1 Bail Bonds, a business in Milford, Michigan.

== Political history ==
In 2016, Maddock was elected as a delegate to the Republican National Convention in Cleveland where she served on the platform committee.

In January 2021, Maddock was elected co-chair of the Michigan Republican party along with chair Ron Weiser. Two years later in February 2023 Maddock chose not to run for another term.

== Support for Donald Trump ==
Maddock has been a strong supporter of President Donald Trump and was a prior board member of Women for Trump, as well as being involved in several pro-Trump organizations such as the Michigan Conservative Coalition. The New York Times said that events around her election "signaled a profound shift in Republican politics".

It was claimed that campaign endorsements by Donald Trump were handled through Maddock in the 2022 primary and general election.

== Statements on public issues ==
In June 2021, Maddock called for Michigan to secede from the United States, saying the secession is "to escape Michigan Democratic Gov. Gretchen Whitmer's tyrannical rule".

Maddock promoted an unsubstantiated rumor on social media in 2022 that Midland Public Schools had placed litter boxes in the bathrooms for students who identified as cats or furries. The school superintendent denied the rumor in a statement issued to parents, and the fact-checking organization Snopes found no evidence for it.

Maddock has been criticized for the language in her social media attacks. A tweet describing Transportation Secretary Pete Buttigieg as a "weak little girl" was criticized as sounding homophobic by George Takei. A tweet describing a Black Michigan elected official as a "scary masked man" was criticized as sounding racist.

== Attempts to change presidential 2020 election outcome ==
Maddock supports Trump's false claims of election fraud in the 2020 presidential election.

In January 2021, Maddock helped organize a delegation of 19 buses to travel to Washington to protest the election results. She spoke at the “Stop the Steal” rally on January 5. Maddock said she was absent from the storming of the Capitol that occurred the next day.

On July 18, 2023, Maddock was charged in connection with the Trump fake electors plot. Maddock, along with 15 others, had submitted certificates to the federal government claiming they were Michigan's “duly elected and qualified electors” for the 2020 presidential election. They were not.

Michigan Attorney General Dana Nessel said they likely violated state laws regarding forgery of a public record and election forgery. The fake electors were referred to the U.S. Attorney for possible prosecution. The Michigan GOP chair later testified before the House committee on the January 6 attack that Maddock and the others planned to hide out in the state Capitol building so they could cast their fake elector ballots on the specified day. That plan did not come to fruition.
