= Michigan's 54th House of Representatives district =

American legislative district

Michigan's 54th State House of Representatives district
Representative
Donni Steele; R–Orion Township
- Demographics: 70.8% White; 6.3% Black; 7% Hispanic; 10% Asian; 0.1% Native American; 0.9% Other; 4.9% Multiracial
- Population (2024): 93,854

Michigan's 54th House of Representatives district is a legislative district within the Michigan House of Representatives located in Oakland County. The district was created in 1965, when the Michigan Supreme Court ordered the reapportionment of state legislative districts from a county-based system to a proportional one following the Supreme Court case Reynolds v. Sims. It is currently represented by Republican Donni Steele of Orion Township.

== List of representatives ==
Representative	Party	Years	Residence	Notes
Edson V. Root Jr.	Republican	1965–1971	Bangor	Died in office.
Bela E. Kennedy	Republican	1971–1972	Bangor	
James S. Farnsworth	Republican	1973–1974	Holland	
Edgar Fredricks	Republican	1975–1978	Holland	
Paul Hillegonds	Republican	1979–1992	Holland	Lived in Augusta until around 1981.
Kirk Profit	Democratic	1993–1998	Ypsilanti	
Ruth Ann Jamnick	Democratic	1999–2004	Ypsilanti	
Alma Wheeler Smith	Democratic	2005–2010	Salem Township	
David E. Rutledge	Democratic	2011–2016	Ypsilanti	
Ronnie Peterson	Democratic	2017–2022	Ypsilanti	
Donni Steele	Republican	2023–present	Orion	
Sarah Pounds	Democratic	(Note: Member-elect.)	Rochester	

== Historical district boundaries ==
Map	Description	Apportionment Plan	Notes
	Allegan County (part); Allegan; Allegan Township; Casco Township; Cheshire Township; Clyde Township; Ganges Township; Holland (part); Laketown Township; Lee Township; Manlius Township; Fennville; Saugatuck Township; Trowbridge Township; Valley Township; Watson Township; Van Buren County	1964 Apportionment Plan	
	Allegan County (part): Excluding; Cheshire Township; Gunplain Township; Lee Township; Leighton Township; Martin Township; Otsego; Otsego Township; Plainwell; Trowbridge Township; Valley Township; Wayland Township; Ottawa County (part): Holland (part); Hudsonville; Georgetown Township (part); Jamestown Township; Zeeland Township; Van Buren County (part): South Haven	1972 Apportionment Plan	
	Allegan County; Barry County (part); Thornapple Township; Yankee Springs Township	1982 Apportionment Plan	
	Washtenaw County (part): Salem Township; Superior Township; Ypsilanti; Ypsilanti Township	1992 Apportionment Plan	
	Washtenaw County (part): Augusta Township; Salem Township; Superior Township; Ypsilanti; Ypsilanti Township	2001 Apportionment Plan	
	Washtenaw County (part): Superior Township; Ypsilanti; Ypsilanti Township	2011 Apportionment Plan	
	Oakland County (part): Auburn Hills (part); Bloomfield Township (part); Bloomfield Hills; Oakland Charter Township (part); Orion Township	2021 Apportionment Plan (Note: Referred to as the Hickory plan.)	

== Recent elections ==
=== 2020s ===
2026 Michigan House of Representatives election
Party	Candidate	Votes	%
Democratic	Sarah Pounds	25,850	52.9
Republican	Roman Gaskey	23,018	47.1
Total votes		48,868	100
Democratic gain from Republican			

2024 Michigan House of Representatives election
Party	Candidate	Votes	%
Republican	Donni Steele (incumbent)	28,884	52.41
Democratic	Shadia Martini	26,223	47.59
Total votes		55,107	100
Republican hold			

2022 Michigan House of Representatives election
Party	Candidate	Votes	%
Republican	Donni Steele	22,960	51.17
Democratic	Shadia Martini	21,912	48.83
Total votes		44,872	100
Republican gain from Democratic			

2020 Michigan House of Representatives election
Party	Candidate	Votes	%
Democratic	Ronnie Dean Peterson (incumbent)	36,533	77.73
Republican	Martin Church	10,464	22.27
Total votes		46,997	100
Democratic hold			

=== 2010s ===
2018 Michigan House of Representatives election
Party	Candidate	Votes	%
Democratic	Ronnie Dean Peterson	28,500	78.7
Republican	Colton A. Campbell	7,737	21.4
Total votes		36,237	100
Democratic hold			

2016 Michigan House of Representatives election
Party	Candidate	Votes	%
Democratic	Ronnie Dean Peterson	30,148	75.0
Republican	Kevin Jardine	10,053	25.0
Total votes		40,201	100
Democratic hold			

2014 Michigan House of Representatives election
Party	Candidate	Votes	%
Democratic	David Rutledge	18,608	75.3
Republican	Ed Moore	6,093	24.7
Total votes		24,701	100
Democratic hold			

2012 Michigan House of Representatives election
Party	Candidate	Votes	%
Democratic	David Rutledge	29,949	77.5
Republican	Bill Emmerich	8,722	22.6
Total votes		38,671	100
Democratic hold			

2010 Michigan House of Representatives election
Party	Candidate	Votes	%
Democratic	David Rutledge	18,146	61.2
Republican	Richard Deitering	9,708	32.7
Independent	David Palmer	1,363	4.6
Constitution	Clifford McKinney	451	1.5
Total votes		29,668	100
Democratic hold			

2008 Michigan House of Representatives election
Party	Candidate	Votes	%
Democratic	Alma Wheeler Smith	33,501	71.1
Republican	Tom Banks	12,281	26.1
Libertarian	David Raaflaub	1,319	2.8
Total votes		47,101	100
Democratic hold			
