= Alma Wheeler Smith =

American politician (born 1941)

Member of the Michigan House of Representatives from the 54th district
- In office January 1, 2005 – December 31, 2010
- Preceded by: Ruth Ann Jamnick
- Succeeded by: David E. Rutledge

Member of the Michigan Senate from the 18th district
- In office January 1, 1995 – December 31, 2002
- Preceded by: Lana Pollack
- Succeeded by: Elizabeth Brater

Personal details
- Born: August 6, 1941 (age 85) Columbia, South Carolina
- Party: Democratic
- Education: University of Michigan (Journalism)

Alma Wheeler Smith (born August 6, 1941) is a politician from the U.S. state of Michigan. She was most recently a member of the Michigan House of Representatives, representing the 54th District, which includes the city of Ypsilanti, Augusta Township, Salem Township, Superior Township, and Ypsilanti Township in Washtenaw County, from 2005 to 2010. A Democrat, she sat on the powerful House Appropriations Committee, served two terms in the Michigan Senate from 1995 to 2002, and sought her party's nomination for Governor of Michigan in 2010.

== Early career ==
Early in her career, Smith worked as a cable commissioner, school board trustee, school board president, and county commissioner. She served as a State Senator representing Ann Arbor in the 18th District for eight years before term limits ended her tenure in that body.

== State representative ==
In the Michigan House of Representatives, Smith has introduced bills on a wide range of topics.

She served in the Michigan House from January 1, 2005 until December 31, 2010, having been unable to retain her House seat in 2010 due to term limits.

== Gubernatorial candidate ==
Representative Smith has announced her candidacy for governor in 2010. According to her campaign site, "As governor, Alma's policies and budgets will support full access to health care for each resident, equal education access and opportunity from preschool to grad school, a safe and clean environment, vital urban centers, a healthy business sector, protection for civil rights and civil liberties and full inclusion for each citizen in Michigan's benefits and opportunities."

On May 10, one day before the filing deadline for the primary, Smith announced that although she was “well on the path” to collecting enough signatures (15,000) to qualify, she had decided not to submit them. In a statement, she said that she shared a “concern of splitting the progressive vote and ending up with a candidate that does not represent core Democratic values.” “Democrats need to unify behind a candidate and I have come to believe that my continued candidacy would only serve to divide us further,” Smith said.

== Family ==
Smith is a member of a prominent Ann Arbor political family. Her father, Albert H. Wheeler, was mayor of Ann Arbor from 1975 to 1978, and the first African American to hold that position. Her sister, Nancy Francis, has served as a Washtenaw County probate judge since 1990. Her son, Conan, served as a Washtenaw County commissioner, and was elected Chairperson of the Ann Arbor City Democratic Party in December 2008. Conan's former wife, Rebekah Warren, represented the 18th District in the Michigan Senate until January 1, 2021, a seat Smith previously held.

Political offices
Preceded by Lana Pollack	Michigan Senate, 18th District; 1995–2002	Succeeded by Liz Brater (D)
Preceded by Ruth Ann Jamnick (D)	Michigan House of Representatives, 54th District; 2005–2010	Succeeded by David E. Rutledge (D)
