= David E. Rutledge =

American politician

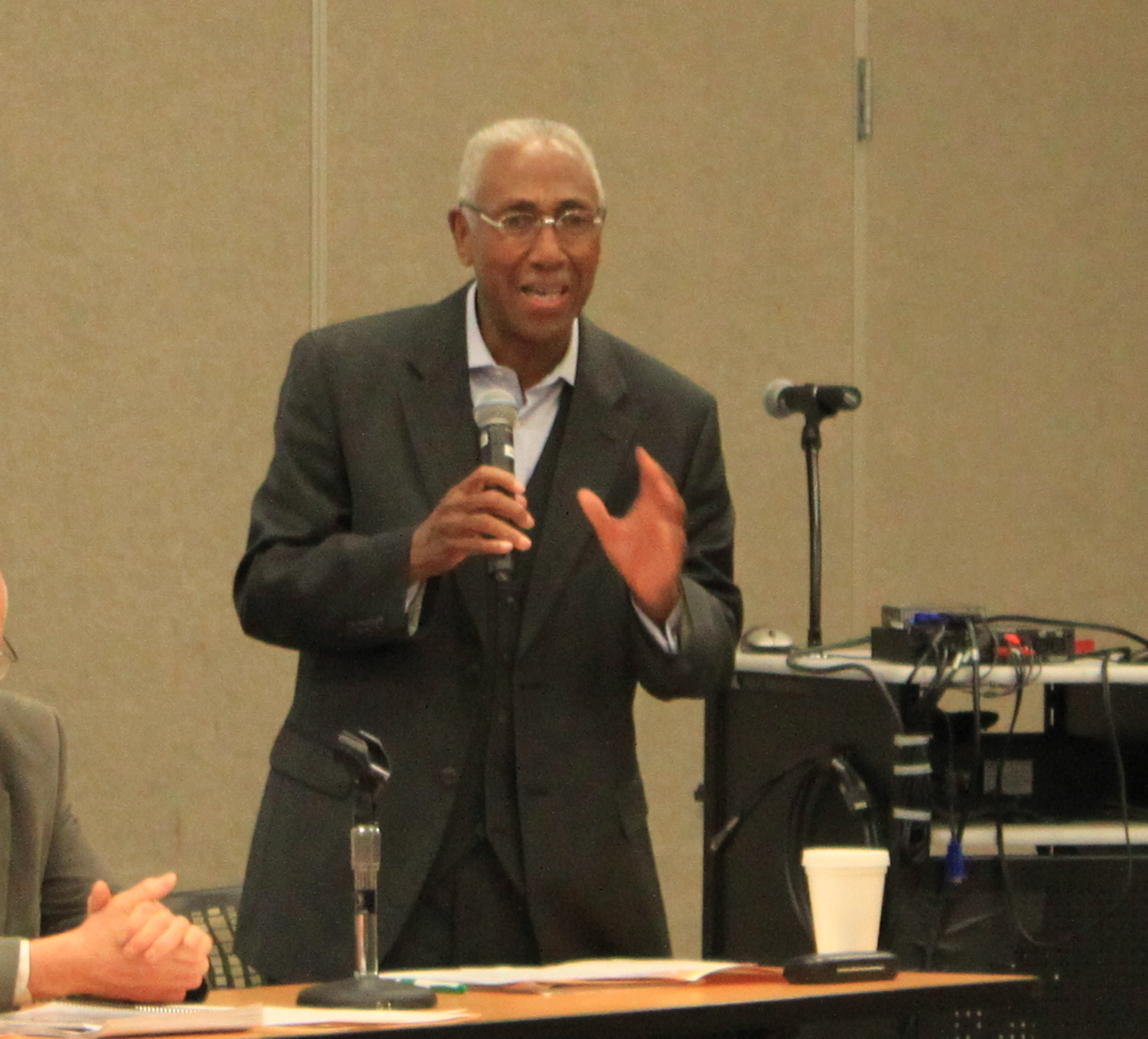
- Rep. Rutledge addressing a town hall meeting

Member of the Michigan House of Representatives from the 54th district
- In office January 1, 2011 – December 31, 2016
- Preceded by: Alma Wheeler Smith
- Succeeded by: Ronnie Peterson

Personal details
- Party: Democratic
- Spouse: Gerri Rutledge
- Education: Tennessee State University

David E. Rutledge is a former state representative, who represented the 54th House District (Ypsilanti Township).

Michigan's 54th House district covers the eastern portion of Washtenaw County, and includes Superior Township and Ypsilanti Township, as well as the City of Ypsilanti.

== Personal life ==
Rutledge is married to Geraldine Simmons Rutledge and the couple have two children. He graduated from Tennessee State University with a degree in political science and has served on several boards and commissions in his locality of Washtenaw County.

== Legislative career ==
During the first several months of tenure, Representative Rutledge has either introduced or participated in discussions and legislation to aid homeowners, protect school districts, and combat teen violence.

In March 2011, Rutledge opposed legislation that would lower unemployment benefits to Michigan workers who have been displaced. The law was signed by Governor Rick Snyder after a 65-44 vote in the House.
