= Kurt Damrow =

American politician (born 1962)

Member of the Michigan House of Representatives from the 84th district
- In office January 1, 2011 – January 1, 2013
- Preceded by: Terry Brown
- Succeeded by: Terry Brown

Personal details
- Born: February 16, 1962 (age 64) Bad Axe, Michigan
- Party: Republican
- Education: Spec’s Howard School of Broadcast Arts

Kurt Edward Damrow (born February 16, 1962) is a former member of the Michigan House of Representatives.

== Early life and education ==
Damrow was born on February 16, 1962, in Bad Axe, Michigan. Damrow graduated from the Nashville Auctioneering Institute and Spec's Howard School of Broadcast Arts.

== Military career ==
On January 16, 1985, Damrow made a delayed enlistment into the Air Force Reserve Command in Detroit. Damrow entered the United States Air Force on March 29, 1985, and served until September 26, 1986, when he was honorably released to Air National Guard status. On October 6, 1986, Damrow enlisted into the California Air National Guard, where he was honorably discharged from on September 2, 1987. The next day, on September 3, Damrow enlisted into the Michigan Air National Guard. On March 3, 1991, Damrow was transferred to the Inactive United States Air Force Reserves. On January 27, 2001, Damrow re-enlisted to the Michigan Air National Guard. On June 1, 2003, Damrow had achieved the rank of staff sergeant. In July 2004, Damrow was injured as a result of hitting a cow with his car in Pinnebog, Michigan. Before the accident, Damrow had gone through the training required to serve in the Iraq War, and was set to be deployed. On January 19, 2006, Damrow was placed on the Temporary Disability Retirement List due to the injuries he had received from the car accident. On August 21, 2009, the listing had been modified from temporary disability retirement to permanent disability retirement.

== Career ==
Damrow worked as an emergency services professional, with the Port Austin Fire Department and the Central Huron Ambulance Service. In the 1996 Republican primary, he unsuccessfully ran for the 7th district of the Huron County commission. He was defeated by incumbent county commissioner Martha Thuemmel. In the 2008 general election, he defeated incumbent Democrat county commissioner Donald V. Pascarella in the 7th district.

On November 2, 2010, Damrow was elected to the Michigan House of Representatives, where he represented the 84th district. Damrow won against incumbent state representative Terry L. Brown by less than 30 votes. Brown requested a recount of the election, which happened in December. The recount affirmed Damrow's victory, concluding he won by 18 votes.

In August 2011, Damrow, along with a legislative liaison, filed a complaint with the Michigan State Police. The complaint implicated many Huron County officials, including judges, attorneys, road commissioners, and the sheriff, Kelly J. Hanson, in several illegal activities. Damrow claimed to have filed the complaint based on the information from his constituents, and that he did not have first hand knowledge of the accusations. The state police ultimately found Damrow's accusations to be unfounded. On October 14, Sheriff Hanson filed a formal statement to the state police in hopes of convicting Damrow for these false police reports. On November 18, investigators filed a report against Damrow with Tuscola County Prosecutor Mark E. Reene. By March 12, 2012, while there had been media outlets stating that Reene had filed the investigation against Damrow with the Michigan Attorney General's Office, Reene explained that he had not yet done it. Reene later recused himself of the case, and the case was assigned to Genesee County Prosecutor David S. Leyton. In May 2012, the investigation against Damrow was closed. Leyton ultimately found that there was "not sufficient evidence to sustain a prosecution of a charge of false report of a crime."

In October 2011, The Daily Reporter in Coldwater, Michigan reported that Damrow had told a veterans' organization he had been injured while serving in the Iraq War. While Damrow was set to be deployed in Iraq, a 2004 car accident ultimately prevented him from actually serving in the war. Damrow claims that he was misquoted by The Daily Reporter. On November 29, 2011, Damrow resigned as chairman of the House Military and Veterans Affairs and Homeland Security Committee.

Politically, Damrow is a Republican, who was affiliated with the Tea Party movement. On October 18, 2011, Damrow's membership from the Huron County Republic Party was revoked. The party's executive committee cited Damrow's improper campaign finance reporting, lack of district leadership, and lack of initiative as state representative in their decision. Party leaders made additional allegations against Damrow including using his status to aid his wife's child visitation rights from a former marriage, as well as misinforming the party about a 2009 personal protection order against him. Damrow would regain membership in the Huron County Republic Party by April 2023.

During his time in the state legislature, Damrow experienced a failed recall attempt.

On August 7, 2012, Damrow was defeated in the primary during his attempt at re-election by Dan Grimshaw of Vassar, Michigan. Damrow won slightly more votes in Huron County, but Grimshaw got more votes in Tuscola County, his home county. Grimshaw was ultimately defeated in the general election by former state representative Terry L. Brown. On August 5, 2014, Damrow was again defeated, this time in a seven-way primary election. After redistricting, Damrow ran for the state house again in the 98th district in 2022, but was defeated in the August 2 primary by former Sanilac County drain commissioner Greg Alexander. While Damrow won more votes in Huron and Tuscola County, Alexander won the Sanilac County vote.

== Personal life ==
Damrow married Kim S. Dufty on May 22, 2010. The couple divorced in 2014.
