= Michigan's 51st House of Representatives district =

American legislative district

Michigan's 51st State House of Representatives district
Representative
Matt Maddock; R–Milford
- Demographics: 89.6% White; 1.6% Black; 3% Hispanic; 1.1% Asian; 0.1% Native American; 0.4% Other; 4.2% Multiracial
- Population (2024): 93,343

Michigan's 51st House of Representatives district is a legislative district within the Michigan House of Representatives located in Oakland County. The district was created in 1965, when the Michigan Supreme Court ordered the reapportionment of state legislative districts from a county-based system to a proportional one following the Supreme Court case Reynolds v. Sims. It is currently represented by Republican Matt Maddock of Milford.

== List of representatives ==
Representative	Party	Years	Residence	Notes
Thomas G. Sharpe	Republican	1965–1978	Howell	
Frederick P. Dillingham	Republican	1979–1986	Fowlerville	
Susan Grimes Munsell	Republican	1987–1992	Howell	Lived in Fowlerville until around 1989.
Candace A. Curtis	Democratic	1993–1998	Swartz Creek	
Patricia A. Lockwood	Democratic	1999–2002	Fenton	
David B. Robertson	Republican	2003–2008	Grand Blanc	
Paul H. Scott	Republican	2009–2012	Grand Blanc	Recalled.
Joseph Graves	Republican	2012–2018	Linden	Lived in Argentine Township until around 2013.
Mike Mueller	Republican	2019–2022	Linden	
Matt Maddock	Republican	2023–present	Milford	

== Historical district boundaries ==
Map	Description	Apportionment Plan	Notes
	Lenawee County (part); Franklin Township; Livingston County; Washtenaw County (part); Bridgewater Township; Dexter Township; Freedom Township; Lima Township; Lodi Township; Lyndon Township; Manchester Township; Pittsfield Township; Saline; Saline Township; Scio Township; Sharon Township; Sylvan Township	1964 Apportionment Plan	
	Livingston County; Ingham County (part); Aurelius Township; Bunker Hill Township; Ingham Township; Leroy Township; Leslie; Leslie Township; Locke Township; Onondaga Township; Vevay Township; Wheatfield Township; White Oak Township; Williamston; Williamstown Township (part)	1972 Apportionment Plan	
	Livingston County (part): Brighton; Brighton Township; Conway Township; Genoa Township; Green Oak Township; Hamburg Township; Handy Township; Hartland Township; Howell; Howell Township; Iosco Township; Marion Township; Putman Township; Tyrone Township; Unadilla Township	1982 Apportionment Plan	
	Genesee County (part): Argentine Township; Clayton Township; Fenton; Fenton Township; Flint Township; Gaines Township; Linden; Mundy Township; Swartz Creek	1992 Apportionment Plan	
	Genesee County (part): Argentine Township; Atlas Township; Fenton; Fenton Township; Grand Blanc Township; Grand Blanc Township; Linden; Mundy Township	2001 Apportionment Plan	
	Genesee County (part): Argentine Township; Atlas Township; Clayton Township; Fenton; Fenton Township; Flushing Township; Gaines Township; Linden; Oakland County (part): Fenton; Groveland Township; Holly Township; Rose Township	2011 Apportionment Plan	
	Oakland County (part): Commerce Township (part); Highland Township; Milford Township; Springfield Township (part); White Lake Township	2021 Apportionment Plan (Note: Referred to as the Hickory plan.)	

== Recent elections ==
=== 2020s ===
2026 Michigan House of Representatives election
Party	Candidate	Votes	%
Republican	Matt Maddock (incumbent)	28,322	55.87
Democratic	Stacey McDuffie	22,368	44.13
Total votes		50,690	100
Republican hold			

2024 Michigan House of Representatives election
Party	Candidate	Votes	%
Republican	Matt Maddock (incumbent)	35,011	59.52
Democratic	Sarah May-Seward	23,809	40.48
Total votes		58,820	100
Republican hold			

2022 Michigan House of Representatives election
Party	Candidate	Votes	%
Republican	Matt Maddock	27,530	57.79
Democratic	Sarah May-Seward	20,110	42.21
Total votes		47,640	100
Republican hold			

2020 Michigan House of Representatives election
Party	Candidate	Votes	%
Republican	Mike Mueller (incumbent)	38,154	64.4
Democratic	Brad May	21,087	35.6
Total votes		59,241	100
Republican hold			

=== 2010s ===
2018 Michigan House of Representatives election
Party	Candidate	Votes	%
Republican	Mike Mueller	26,870	59.9
Democratic	David Lossing	18,012	40.1
Total votes		44,882	100
Republican hold			

2016 Michigan House of Representatives election
Party	Candidate	Votes	%
Republican	Joseph Graves	30,468	60.7
Democratic	Ryan Bladzik	17,050	34.0
Libertarian	Mark L. Sanborn	2,677	5.3
Total votes		50,195	100
Republican hold			

2014 Michigan House of Representatives election
Party	Candidate	Votes	%
Republican	Joseph Graves	19,433	57.9
Democratic	Ken Thomas	14,115	42.1
Total votes		33,548	100
Republican hold			

2012 Michigan House of Representatives election
Party	Candidate	Votes	%
Republican	Joseph Graves	26,170	54.3
Democratic	Steven Losey	22,001	45.7
Total votes		48,171	100
Republican hold			

2012 Michigan House of Representatives by-election
Party	Candidate	Votes	%
Republican	Joseph Graves	10,290	53.4
Democratic	Steven Losey	8,173	42.4
Green	Cary Neuville-Justice	803	4.2
Total votes		19,266	100
Republican hold			

2010 Michigan House of Representatives election
Party	Candidate	Votes	%
Republican	Paul Scott	21,576	59.4
Democratic	Art Reyes	14,745	40.6
Total votes		36,321	100
Republican hold			

2008 Michigan House of Representatives election
Party	Candidate	Votes	%
Republican	Paul Scott	29,919	53.0
Democratic	Michael Thorp	26,587	47.1
Total votes		56,506	100
Republican hold			
