= Paul H. Scott =

American politician (born 1982)

Member of the Michigan House of Representatives from the 51st district
- In office January 1, 2009 – November 18, 2011
- Preceded by: Dave Robertson
- Succeeded by: Joe Graves

Personal details
- Born: March 2, 1982 (age 44) Grand Blanc, Michigan, U.S.
- Party: Republican
- Relations: Harold and R. Paula Scott, parents
- Education: Grand Blanc High School; University of Michigan; Harvard University

Paul Scott (born March 2, 1982) is an American politician from Grand Blanc, Michigan. A member of the Michigan State House of Representatives, Scott was recalled on November 8, 2011.

== Early life ==
Scott was born on March 2, 1982 in Grand Blanc, Michigan. Scott graduated from Grand Blanc High School in 2000. He received his bachelor's degree from the University of Michigan, studied in a master's of public policy program at Harvard University, and received a J.D. degree from the University of Michigan Law School.

== Political life ==
Scott ran for the Michigan State House of Representatives in 2008. He first faced off against pilot James B. Swenor and businessman Vince Lorraine in the Republican primary and won with 41 percent of the vote. He then stood against Michael J. Thorp in the general election and defeated him.

After one term as State Representative, Scott ran for the Secretary of State nomination in 2010 but lost the nomination at the Republican State Convention to Ruth Johnson. In 2010, he won reelection to the 51st district of the Michigan House of Representatives, defeating Art Reyes.

Scott was one of roughly 20 Michigan elected officials targeted for recall efforts in 2011, primarily by voters and interest groups opposed to changes in state education funding mechanisms, taxation of some retirement income and opposition to labor unions. Voters and the Michigan Education Association, opposed to Scott's actions as the chair of the House Education Committee, launched a recall effort against him. After recall supporters collected enough signatures to put the recall on the November 2011 election ballot in his district, Scott launched a legal challenge against the recall, but the appeal was denied unanimously by the Michigan Supreme Court. On November 8, 2011, Scott was recalled.

== Election history ==
2008 Michigan House of Representatives Election, district 51
Party	Candidate	Votes	%
Republican	Paul H. Scott	29,919	52.9%
Democratic	Michael J. Thorp	26,587	47.1%

2010 Michigan House of Representatives Election, district 51
Party	Candidate	Votes	%
Republican	Paul H. Scott	22,509	59.6%
Democratic	Art Reyes	15,275	40.4%
