= Matt Maddock =

American politician

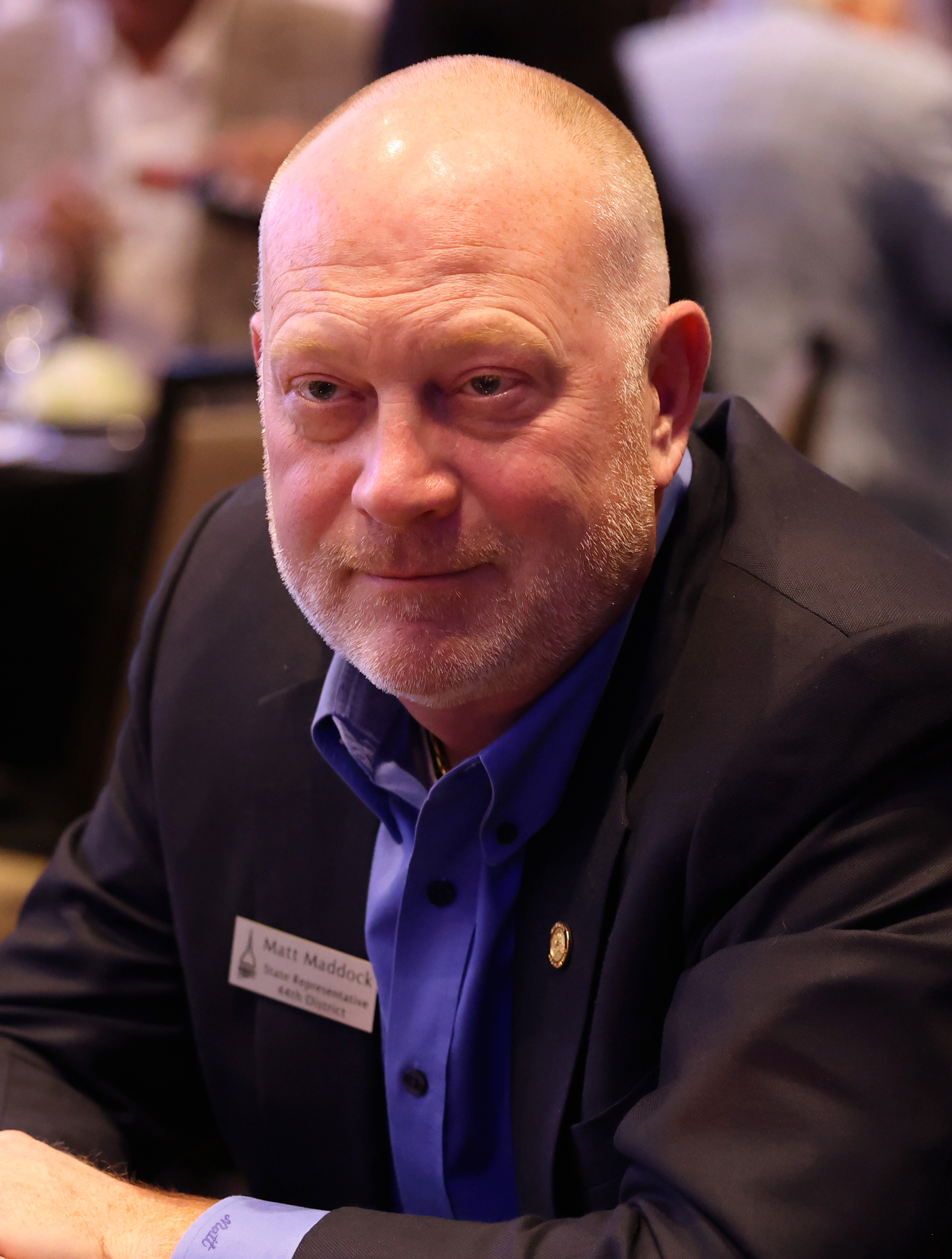
- Maddock in 2024

Member of the Michigan House of Representatives
- Incumbent
- Assumed office January 1, 2019
- Preceded by: Jim Runestad
- Constituency: 44th district (2019–2022); 51st district (2023–present)

Personal details
- Party: Republican
- Spouse: Meshawn Maddock
- Children: 3

Matthew Maddock (born December 11, 1965) is an American businessman and politician serving as a member of the Michigan House of Representatives since 2019, currently representing the 51st district. He is a member of the Republican Party.

== Career ==
On November 6, 2018, Maddock was elected to his first term, where he represented the 44th district in the Michigan House of Representatives. In his first term, Maddock was appointed to be the Chairman of the House Appropriations Subcommittee on Transportation, as well as Chairman of the Joint Committee on Administrative Rules. A Republican, Maddock was first elected in 2018. Prior to being elected to the 110-member Michigan House of Representatives, he was a businessman in Oakland County. He was elected to a second term in 2020.

In 2021, Maddock proposed legislation to require fact-checkers who register with the International Fact Check Network to then register with the state of Michigan and fine them if they engaged in fact-checking without registration.

In 2022, after redistricting, Maddock was elected to the 51st district. Maddock was expelled from the Republican caucus by Speaker Jason Wentworth in April 2022 for allegedly violating confidentiality rules. Maddock claimed his expulsion was retaliation for his support of Kristina Karamo and Matt DePerno in the Republican primaries. In the next term starting in January 2023, Maddock was re-admitted to the Republican caucus. He was reelected in 2024.

=== COVID-19 ===
During the COVID-19 pandemic in Michigan, Maddock promoted misinformation about the virus. In October 2020, Maddock falsely claimed on Facebook that COVID-19 was less lethal than the flu. Matt Maddock routinely did not wear a face mask at the Capitol building; his wife, Michigan Republican Party co-chair Meshawn Maddock, made inaccurate claims on social media that the use of face coverings was "ineffective" and "harmful" and suggested that employers be sued over the matter.

In November 2020, Maddock introduced a resolution to impeach Democratic Governor Gretchen Whitmer over her COVID-19 shutdown orders; the resolution, introduced during a lame-duck session, did not gain the support of the Republican legislative leadership though the Michigan Supreme Court did rule the shutdown orders illegal a month later.

In April 2021, Matt Maddock was one of a handful of Republican state representatives to appear at a protest opposing COVID-19 vaccine passports.

=== Efforts to overturn 2020 presidential election results ===
Maddock had promoted the false claim that the 2020 presidential election, in which Donald Trump was defeated by Joe Biden, was marred by election fraud. In November 2020, Maddock and other Trump supporters protested at the TCF Center at Detroit to challenge the counting of votes because they felt the legal process was not being followed. Maddock falsely claimed that 35,000 ballots "showed up out of nowhere" and that Democrats "were pretty much cheating in front of poll watchers."

In December 2020, Maddock and Daire Rendon joined a federal lawsuit filed by Trump supporters to challenge the election results. The suit asked for state lawmakers to certify the election results, therefore letting the Republican-led Michigan Legislature to overturn Biden's victory in the state. The judge dismissed the suit, writing that their arguments were "flat-out wrong" and "a fundamental and obvious misreading of the Constitution."

In January 2021, ahead of the counting of the electoral votes and the U.S. Capitol attack, Maddock and 11 other Michigan Republican state legislators wrote a letter to Vice President Mike Pence, urging him to refuse to count electoral votes from states won by Biden until a voter fraud investigation could take place. Responding to such calls, Pence replied in a letter to Congress, "It is my considered judgment that my oath to support and defend the Constitution constrains me from claiming unilateral authority to determine which electoral votes should be counted and which should not."

Both Maddock and his wife, Meshawn Maddock, co-chair of the Michigan Republican Party and a member of the national advisory board of Women for Trump, were present at the January 5, 2021 rallies. A video and photo of the couple speaking at that rally is no longer available on her Instagram account. Meshawn claimed she had organized 19 buses of people to attend the event. Meshawn also texted, "As a leader for Republicans in Michigan, I'm going to stand shoulder to shoulder with Americans that know voter fraud is real. Voters no longer trust the system and we want people prosecuted. Now is not the time for summer soldiers and sunshine Patriots, now is the time for brave men to do the right thing. We never stop fighting."

When the Maddocks walked to the Trump rally at The Ellipse on January 6, they said they couldn't get in and went back to their hotel. After the violent attack on the Capitol, Meshawn Maddock said that the rally was intended to be a "peaceful event"; that the people who "became a mob and broke the law should be held accountable"; and that she was "horrified by the death of the young woman and pray for the healing of our nation."

Maddock was endorsed by Donald Trump on November 11, 2021.

=== Prediction of political violence ===
Maddock's wife, Meshawn, was among sixteen Michigan Republicans who were indicted in July 2023 for alleged conspiracy in a fake electors scheme to overturn the 2020 Michigan presidential election results. At an August 2023 legal defense fundraiser at his home, Maddock told attendees that "if the government continues to weaponize these departments against conservatives" that someone would be shot "or we're going have a civil war or some sort of revolution."

=== Claims of illegal immigration ===
On March 27, 2024, Maddock promoted the conspiracy theory that the governor of Michigan Gretchen Whitmer had invited a group of undocumented noncitizens to move to the city of Detroit in a post on X, formerly known as Twitter. In his posts, Maddock stated that three buses at Detroit Metro Airport were loaded up with "illegal invaders", and he was inquiring as to their destination. In fact, the buses were chartered to transport the Gonzaga University men's basketball team to compete in an NCAA Sweet 16 tournament game against the Purdue Boilermakers at Little Caesars Arena in Detroit.

=== Gordie Howe International Bridge ===
In February 2026, Maddock praised President Donald Trump for threatening to block the opening of the Gordie Howe International Bridge between Windsor, Ontario and Detroit, Michigan.

== Electoral history ==
Michigan State House 51st District Election 2022
Party	Candidate	Votes	%	±%
Republican	Matt Maddock	27,224	57.9	N/A
Democratic	Sarah May-Seward	19,766	42.1	N/A

Michigan State House 44th District Election 2020
Party	Candidate	Votes	%	±%
Republican	Matt Maddock	35,416	59.5	N/A
Democratic	Denise Forrest	24,067	40.5	N/A

Michigan State House 44th District Election 2018
Party	Candidate	Votes	%	±%
Republican	Matt Maddock	26,184	57.5	N/A
Democratic	Laura Dodd	19,330	42.5	N/A
