= Joseph Graves (politician) =

American politician

Member of the Michigan House of Representatives from the 51st district
- In office March 6, 2012 – January 9, 2019
- Preceded by: Paul Scott
- Succeeded by: Mike Mueller

Personal details
- Party: Republican
- Spouse: Denise
- Children: 4
- Education: Siena Heights University

Military service
- Allegiance: United States of America
- Branch/service: United States Army

Joseph "Joe" Graves is a Republican politician. Graves was a member of the Michigan House of Representatives.

== Education ==
Graves has a bachelor's degree in Business Administration from Siena Heights University.

== Career ==
Graves was a real estate agent before entering politics. Graves was first elected to the state legislature in February 2012 to fill the vacancy caused by the recall of Republican Paul H. Scott.

== Personal life ==
Graves' wife is Denise. They have four children.

Political offices
Preceded by Paul Scott	Michigan Representatives; 51st District; 2012–2019	Succeeded by Mike Mueller
