= 103rd Michigan Legislature =

The 103rd Michigan Legislature began on January 8, 2025. The Michigan House of Representatives was controlled by the Republican Party. Representative Mike Harris presented as the House Majority Whip; the House Speaker is Matt Hall.

== House of Representatives ==
| District | State Representative | Party | County(ies) | Term |
|---|---|---|---|---|
| 1 | Tyrone Carter | Dem | Wayne | 4th |
| 2 | Tullio Liberati | Dem | Wayne | 3rd |
| 3 | Alabas Farhat | Dem | Wayne | 2nd |
| 4 | Karen Whitsett | Dem | Wayne | 4th |
| 5 | Regina Weiss | Dem | Oakland, Wayne | 3rd |
| 6 | Natalie Price | Dem | Oakland, Wayne | 2nd |
| 7 | Tonya Myers Phillips | Dem | Oakland, Wayne | 1st |
| 8 | Helena Scott | Dem | Oakland, Wayne | 3rd |
| 9 | Joe Tate | Dem | Wayne | 4th |
| 10 | Veronica Paiz | Dem | Macomb, Wayne | 2nd |
| 11 | Donavan McKinney | Dem | Macomb, Wayne | 2nd |
| 12 | Kimberly Edwards | Dem | Macomb, Wayne | 3rd |
| 13 | Mai Xiong↑ | Dem | Macomb, Wayne | 2nd (1st full) |
| 14 | Mike McFall | Dem | Macomb, Wayne | 2nd |
| 15 | Erin Byrnes | Dem | Wayne | 2nd |
| 16 | Stephanie Young | Dem | Wayne | 3rd |
| 17 | Laurie Pohutsky | Dem | Wayne | 4th |
| 18 | Jason Hoskins | Dem | Oakland | 2nd |
| 19 | Samantha Steckloff | Dem | Oakland | 3rd |
| 20 | Noah Arbit | Dem | Oakland | 2nd |
| 21 | Kelly Breen | Dem | Oakland | 3rd |
| 22 | Matt Koleszar | Dem | Wayne | 4th |
| 23 | Jason Morgan | Dem | Oakland, Washtenaw, Wayne | 2nd |
| 24 | Ranjeev Puri | Dem | Wayne | 3rd |
| 25 | Peter Herzberg↑ | Dem | Wayne | 2nd (1st full) |
| 26 | Dylan Wegela | Dem | Wayne | 2nd |
| 27 | Rylee Linting | Rep | Wayne | 1st |
| 28 | Jamie Thompson | Rep | Monroe, Wayne | 2nd |
| 29 | James DeSana | Rep | Monroe, Wayne | 2nd |
| 30 | William Bruck | Rep | Lenawee, Monroe | 2nd |
| 31 | Reggie Miller | Dem | Lenawee, Monroe, Washtenaw, Wayne | 2nd |
| 32 | Jimmie Wilson Jr. | Dem | Washtenaw | 2nd |
| 33 | Morgan Foreman | Dem | Washtenaw | 1st |
| 34 | Nancy Jenkins-Arno | Rep | Lenawee | 1st |
| 35 | Jennifer Wortz | Rep | Branch, Hillsdale, Lenawee | 1st |
| 36 | Steve Carra | Rep | Cass, St. Joseph | 3rd |
| 37 | Brad Paquette | Rep | Berrien, Cass | 4th |
| 38 | Joey Andrews | Dem | Allegan, Berrien, Van Buren | 2nd |
| 39 | Pauline Wendzel | Rep | Allegan, Berrien, Van Buren | 4th |
| 40 | Matt Longjohn | Dem | Kalamazoo | 1st |
| 41 | Julie Rogers | Dem | Kalamazoo | 3rd |
| 42 | Matt Hall | Rep | Allegan, Kalamazoo | 4th |
| 43 | Rachelle Smit | Rep | Allegan, Barry, Eaton, Ottawa | 2nd |
| 44 | Steve Frisbie | Rep | Calhoun | 1st |
| 45 | Sarah Lightner | Rep | Calhoun, Kalamazoo, Jackson | 4th |
| 46 | Kathy Schmaltz | Rep | Jackson, Washtenaw | 2nd |
| 47 | Carrie Rheingans | Dem | Jackson, Washtenaw | 2nd |
| 48 | Jennifer Conlin | Dem | Jackson, Livingston, Washtenaw | 2nd |
| 49 | Ann Bollin | Rep | Livingston, Oakland | 4th |
| 50 | Jason Woolford | Rep | Livingston | 1st |
| 51 | Matt Maddock | Rep | Oakland | 4th |
| 52 | Mike Harris↑ | Rep | Oakland | 3rd (2nd full) |
| 53 | Brenda Carter | Dem | Oakland | 4th |
| 54 | Donni Steele | Rep | Oakland | 2nd |
| 55 | Mark Tisdel | Rep | Oakland | 3rd |
| 56 | Sharon MacDonell | Dem | Oakland | 2nd |
| 57 | Thomas Kuhn | Rep | Macomb, Oakland | 2nd |
| 58 | Ron Robinson | Rep | Macomb | 1st |
| 59 | Doug Wozniak | Rep | Macomb | 4th |
| 60 | Joseph Aragona | Rep | Macomb | 2nd |
| 61 | Denise Mentzer | Dem | Macomb | 2nd |
| 62 | Alicia St. Germaine | Rep | Macomb | 2nd |
| 63 | Jay DeBoyer | Rep | Macomb, St. Clair | 2nd |
| 64 | Joseph Pavlov | Rep | Sanilac, St. Clair | 1st |
| 65 | Jaime Greene | Rep | Lapeer, Macomb, St. Clair | 2nd |
| 66 | Josh Schriver | Rep | Macomb, Oakland | 2nd |
| 67 | Phil Green | Rep | Genesee, Lapeer, Tuscola | 4th |
| 68 | David Martin | Rep | Genesee, Oakland | 3rd |
| 69 | Jasper Martus | Dem | Genesee | 2nd |
| 70 | Cynthia Neeley↑ | Dem | Genesee | 4th (3rd full) |
| 71 | Brian BeGole | Rep | Gensee, Saginaw, Shiawassee | 2nd |
| 72 | Mike Mueller | Rep | Genesee, Livingston, Oakland | 4th |
| 73 | Julie Brixie | Dem | Ingham | 4th |
| 74 | Kara Hope | Dem | Ingham | 4th |
| 75 | Penelope Tsernoglou | Dem | Clinton, Ingham, Shiawassee | 2nd |
| 76 | Angela Witwer | Dem | Eaton | 4th |
| 77 | Emily Dievendorf | Dem | Clinton, Eaton, Ingham | 2nd |
| 78 | Gina Johnsen | Rep | Barry, Eaton, Ionia, Kent | 2nd |
| 79 | Angela Rigas | Rep | Allegan, Barry, Kent | 2nd |
| 80 | Phil Skaggs | Dem | Kent | 2nd |
| 81 | Stephen Wooden | Dem | Kent | 1st |
| 82 | Kristian Grant | Dem | Kent | 2nd |
| 83 | John Fitzgerald | Dem | Kent | 2nd |
| 84 | Carol Glanville↑ | Dem | Kent | 3rd (2nd full) |
| 85 | Bradley Slagh | Rep | Ottawa | 4th |
| 86 | Nancy De Boer | Rep | Allegan, Ottawa | 2nd |
| 87 | Will Snyder | Dem | Muskegon | 2nd |
| 88 | Greg VanWoerkom | Rep | Muskegon, Ottawa | 4th |
| 89 | Luke Meerman | Rep | Kent, Muskegon, Ottawa | 4th |
| 90 | Bryan Posthumus | Rep | Kent | 3rd |
| 91 | Pat Outman | Rep | Ionia, Kent, Montcalm | 3rd |
| 92 | Jerry Neyer | Rep | Gratiot, Isabella | 2nd |
| 93 | Tim Kelly | Rep | Clinton, Gratiot, Ionia, Montcalm, Saginaw | 1st |
| 94 | Amos O'Neal | Dem | Saginaw | 3rd |
| 95 | Bill G. Schuette | Rep | Gladwin, Midland | 2nd |
| 96 | Timothy Beson | Rep | Bay | 3rd |
| 97 | Matthew Bierlein | Rep | Bay, Genesee, Saginaw, Tuscola | 2nd |
| 98 | Gregory Alexander | Rep | Huron, Lapeer, Sanilac, Tuscola | 2nd |
| 99 | Mike Hoadley | Rep | Arenac, Bay, Clare, Gladwin, Iosco, Ogemaw | 2nd |
| 100 | Tom Kunse | Rep | Clare, Lake, Mecosta, Osceola | 2nd |
| 101 | Joseph Fox | Rep | Lake, Mason, Newaygo, Oceana, Wexford | 2nd |
| 102 | Curt VanderWall | Rep | Manistee, Mason, Muskegon, Oceana | 4th |
| 103 | Betsy Coffia | Dem | Benzie, Grand Traverse, Leelenau | 2nd |
| 104 | John Roth | Rep | Antrim, Benzie, Grand Traverse, Kalkaska, Manistee, Wexford | 3rd |
| 105 | Ken Borton | Rep | Antrim, Crawford, Kalkaska, Missaukee, Oscoda, Otsego, Roscommon | 3rd |
| 106 | Cam Cavitt | Rep | Alcona, Alpena, Cheboygan, Montmorency, Oscoda, Presque Isle | 2nd |
| 107 | Parker Fairbairn | Rep | Charlevoix, Chippewa, Emmet, Mackinac | 1st |
| 108 | David Prestin | Rep | Chippewa, Delta, Luce, Mackinac, Menominee, Schoolcraft | 2nd |
| 109 | Karl Bohnak | Rep | Alger, Baraga, Dickinson, Marquette | 1st |
| 110 | Gregory Markkanen | Rep | Dickinson, Gogebic, Houghton, Iron, Keweenaw, Ontonagon | 4th |

- ↑: First elected in a special election.

== See also ==
- List of Michigan state legislatures
