= 2022 Michigan House of Representatives election =

- November 8, 2022

All 110 seats in the Michigan House of Representatives 56 seats needed for a majority
	Majority party	Minority party
Leader	Donna Lasinski (term-limited)	Jason Wentworth (term-limited)
Party	Democratic	Republican
Leader since	January 13, 2021	January 13, 2021
Leader's seat	52nd–Ann Arbor	97th–Clare
Last election	52 seats, 49.86%	58 seats, 49.60%
Seats before	53	57
Seats won	56	54
Seat change	▲3	▼3
Popular vote	2,179,190	2,121,890
Percentage	50.56%	49.23%
Swing	▲0.70%	▼0.37%
- Democratic gain Republican gain Democratic hold Republican hold Democratic: 40–50% 50–60% 60–70% 70–80% 80–90% >90% Republican: 50–60% 60–70% 70–80%
Speaker before election
Jason Wentworth
Republican
Elected Speaker
Joe Tate
Democratic

An election was held on November 8, 2022, to elect all 110 members to Michigan's House of Representatives. The election coincided with elections for other offices, including governor, State Senate and U.S. House of Representatives. Democrats won a majority of 56 out of 110 seats, winning control of the chamber for the first time since 2008.

== Predictions ==
Source	Ranking	As of
Sabato's Crystal Ball	Lean R	May 19, 2022

== Background ==
This was the first election to take place after redistricting based on the 2020 United States census. Following the approval of a voter-initiated constitutional amendment in 2018, the responsibility for legislative and congressional reapportionment was transferred from the state legislature to a 13-member citizens commission. Many blamed the maps drawn by Republicans after the 2010 census for enabling the party to maintain control of the legislature throughout the decade despite losing the statewide popular vote multiple times. In 2020, the Republican Party had narrowly retained their majority of the chamber.

== Results ==
Despite expectations that Republicans would maintain control, Democrats gained three seats, giving them a majority of 56 out of 110 seats and winning control of the chamber for the first time since 2008. Simultaneously with Democrats gains in the state senate, winning control of that chamber the first time since 1984, and Governor Gretchen Whitmer winning re-election, Democrats won a trifecta in the state for the first time in 40 years. Democrats benefited from a more favorable map than they had in the previous decade, as well as the down-ballot effects of Whitmer's victory and the passage of a referendum on abortion rights.

== Close races ==
Seats where the margin of victory was under 10%:

1. District 103, 1.37% (gain)
2. District 27, 1.56%
3. District 28, 1.98%
4. District 54, 2.34% (gain)
5. District 58, 2.66%
6. District 29, 2.96% (gain)
7. District 38, 3.58%
8. District 55, 3.6%
9. District 61, 4.05%
10. District 44, 4.5%
11. District 31, 4.52%
12. District 57, 5.28%
13. District 109, 5.96%
14. District 62, 6.84%
15. District 48, 7.28%
16. District 22, 8.5%
17. District 83, 8.12%
18. District 46, 8.74%
19. District 68, 9.44% (gain)
20. District 42, 9.98%

== Election results by district ==
All results below are from the certified election results posted by the secretary of state.

=== District 1 ===
2022 Michigan's 1st House of Representatives district general election
Party	Candidate	Votes	%
Democratic	Tyrone Carter	14,484	87.45%
Republican	Paula M. Campbell	1,790	10.81%
Libertarian	Donnie Love	288	1.74%
Total votes		16,562	100.0

=== District 2 ===
2022 Michigan's 2nd House of Representatives district general election
Party	Candidate	Votes	%
Democratic	Tullio Liberati Jr.	18,847	60.93%
Republican	Michael Joseph D'Onofrio	12,083	39.07%
Total votes		30,930	100.0

=== District 3 ===
2022 Michigan's 3rd House of Representatives district general election
Party	Candidate	Votes	%
Democratic	Alabas Farhat	15,595	74.59%
Republican	Ginger L. Shearer	5,308	25.39%
Write-in	Shona Doreen Beasley	4	0.02%
Total votes		20,907	100.0

=== District 4 ===
2022 Michigan's 4th House of Representatives district general election
Party	Candidate	Votes	%
Democratic	Karen Whitsett	16,990	87.08%
Republican	Tonya Renay Wells	2,520	12.92%
Total votes		19,510	100.0

=== District 5 ===
2022 Michigan's 5th House of Representatives district general election
Party	Candidate	Votes	%
Democratic	Natalie Price	30,699	78.35%
Republican	Paul Taros	8,481	21.65%
Total votes		39,180	100.0

=== District 6 ===
2022 Michigan's 6th House of Representatives district general election
Party	Candidate	Votes	%
Democratic	Regina Weiss	33,898	83.90%
Republican	Charles T. Villerot	6,507	16.10%
Total votes		40,405	100.0

=== District 7 ===
2022 Michigan's 7th House of Representatives district general election
Party	Candidate	Votes	%
Democratic	Helena Scott	34,427	100.00%
Total votes		34,427	100.0

=== District 8 ===
2022 Michigan's 8th House of Representatives district general election
Party	Candidate	Votes	%
Democratic	Mike McFall	23,364	78.88%
Republican	Robert Noble	6,254	21.12%
Total votes		29,618	100.0

=== District 9 ===
2022 Michigan's 9th House of Representatives district general election
Party	Candidate	Votes	%
Democratic	Abraham Aiyash	17,821	91.60%
Republican	Michele Lundgren	1,634	8.40%
Total votes		19,455	100.0

=== District 10 ===
2022 Michigan's 10th House of Representatives district general election
Party	Candidate	Votes	%
Democratic	Joe Tate	28,064	68.43%
Republican	Mark Corcoran	12,948	31.57%
Total votes		41,012	100.0

=== District 11 ===
2022 Michigan's 11th House of Representatives district general election
Party	Candidate	Votes	%
Democratic	Veronica Paiz	23,656	66.57%
Republican	Mark T. Foster	11,882	33.43%
Total votes		35,538	100.0

=== District 12 ===
2022 Michigan's 12th House of Representatives district general election
Party	Candidate	Votes	%
Democratic	Kimberly Edwards	20,962	70.43%
Republican	Diane Saber	8,159	27.41%
Libertarian	Gregory Creswell	643	2.16%
Total votes		29,764	100.0

=== District 13 ===
2022 Michigan's 13th House of Representatives district general election
Party	Candidate	Votes	%
Democratic	Lori Stone	19,962	67.41%
Republican	Ronald A. Singer	9,649	32.59%
Total votes		29,611	100.0

=== District 14 ===
2022 Michigan's 14th House of Representatives district general election
Party	Candidate	Votes	%
Democratic	Donavan McKinney	18,968	71.35%
Republican	Wendy Jo Watters	7,174	26.98%
Green	Jeff Sparling	444	1.67%
Total votes		26,586	100.0

=== District 15 ===
2022 Michigan's 15th House of Representatives district general election
Party	Candidate	Votes	%
Democratic	Erin Byrnes	17,864	61.64%
Republican	Steven J. Mackie	11,119	38.36%
Total votes		28,983	100.0

=== District 16 ===
2022 Michigan's 16th House of Representatives district general election
Party	Candidate	Votes	%
Democratic	Stephanie A. Young	29,550	77.92%
Republican	Keith Jones	8,372	22.08%
Total votes		37,922	100.0

=== District 17 ===
2022 Michigan's 17th House of Representatives district general election
Party	Candidate	Votes	%
Democratic	Laurie Pohutsky	24,482	69.04%
Republican	Keith Jones	10,980	30.96%
Total votes		35,462	100.0

=== District 18 ===
2022 Michigan's 18th House of Representatives district general election
Party	Candidate	Votes	%
Democratic	Jason Hoskins	34,419	79.63%
Republican	Wendy Webster Jackson	8,803	20.37%
Total votes		43,222	100.0

=== District 19 ===
2022 Michigan's 19th House of Representatives district general election
Party	Candidate	Votes	%
Democratic	Samantha Steckloff	31,957	67.09%
Republican	Anthony Paesano	15,678	32.91%
Total votes		47,635	100.0

=== District 20 ===
2022 Michigan's 20th House of Representatives district general election
Party	Candidate	Votes	%
Democratic	Noah Arbit	27,824	56.64%
Republican	Albert Mansour	21,303	43.36%
Total votes		49,127	100.0

=== District 21 ===
2022 Michigan's 21st House of Representatives district general election
Party	Candidate	Votes	%
Democratic	Kelly Breen	22,670	56.43%
Republican	David Staudt	16,981	42.27%
Libertarian	James K. Young	521	1.30%
Total votes		40,172	100.0

=== District 22 ===
2022 Michigan's 22nd House of Representatives district general election
Party	Candidate	Votes	%
Democratic	Matt Koleszar	28,051	54.25%
Republican	Cathryn Neracher	23,660	45.75%
Total votes		51,711	100.0

=== District 23 ===
2022 Michigan's 23rd House of Representatives district general election
Party	Candidate	Votes	%
Democratic	Jason Morgan	24,257	65.10%
Republican	Richard L. Sharland	13,004	34.90%
Total votes		37,261	100.0

=== District 24 ===
2022 Michigan's 24th House of Representatives district general election
Party	Candidate	Votes	%
Democratic	Ranjeev Puri	24,866	60.90%
Republican	John Anthony	15,968	39.10%
Total votes		40,834	100.0

=== District 25 ===
2022 Michigan's 25th House of Representatives district general election
Party	Candidate	Votes	%
Democratic	Kevin Coleman	21,204	63.34%
Republican	Scott T. Barlow	12,273	36.66%
Write-in	Robert R. Stano	0	0.00%
Total votes		33,477	100.0

=== District 26 ===
2022 Michigan's 26th House of Representatives district general election
Party	Candidate	Votes	%
Democratic	Dylan Wegela	20,470	67.80%
Republican	James C. Townsend	9,721	32.20%
Total votes		30,191	100.0

=== District 27 ===
Results by precinct Churches: 50–60%; 60–70%; Howey: 50–60%; 60–70%

2022 Michigan's 27th House of Representatives district general election
Party	Candidate	Votes	%
Democratic	Jaime Churches	21,384	50.78%
Republican	Bob Howey	20,724	49.22%
Total votes		42,108	100.0

=== District 28 ===
2022 Michigan's 28th House of Representatives district general election
Party	Candidate	Votes	%
Republican	Jamie Thompson	18,969	50.99%
Democratic	Robert Kull	18,234	49.01%
Total votes		37,203	100.0

=== District 29 ===
2022 Michigan's 29th House of Representatives district general election
Party	Candidate	Votes	%
Republican	James DeSana	18,042	51.48%
Democratic	Alex Garza	17,002	48.52%
Total votes		35,044	100.0

=== District 30 ===
2022 Michigan's 30th House of Representatives district general election
Party	Candidate	Votes	%
Republican	William Bruck	25,163	63.27%
Democratic	Suzanne Jennens	14,606	36.73%
Total votes		39,769	100.0

=== District 31 ===
2022 Michigan's 31st House of Representatives district general election
Party	Candidate	Votes	%
Democratic	Reggie Miller	21,810	52.26%
Republican	Dale Biniecki	19,925	47.74%
Total votes		41,735	100.0

=== District 32 ===
2022 Michigan's 32nd House of Representatives district general election
Party	Candidate	Votes	%
Democratic	Jimmie Wilson Jr.	28,211	79.28%
Republican	Martin A. Church	7,375	20.72%
Total votes		35,586	100.0

=== District 33 ===
2022 Michigan's 33rd House of Representatives district general election
Party	Candidate	Votes	%
Democratic	Felicia Brabec	35,761	75.49%
Republican	Robert Borer III	11,612	24.51%
Total votes		47,373	100.0

=== District 34 ===
2022 Michigan's 34th House of Representatives district general election
Party	Candidate	Votes	%
Republican	Dale Zorn	24,146	62.25%
Democratic	John E. Dahlgren	14,642	37.75%
Total votes		38,788	100.0

=== District 35 ===
2022 Michigan's 35th House of Representatives district general election
Party	Candidate	Votes	%
Republican	Andrew Fink	25,210	72.83%
Democratic	Andrew Watkins	9,407	27.17%
Total votes		34,617	100.0

=== District 36 ===
2022 Michigan's 36th House of Representatives district general election
Party	Candidate	Votes	%
Republican	Steve Carra	21,589	66.29%
Democratic	Roger M. Williams	10,979	33.71%
Total votes		32,568	100.0

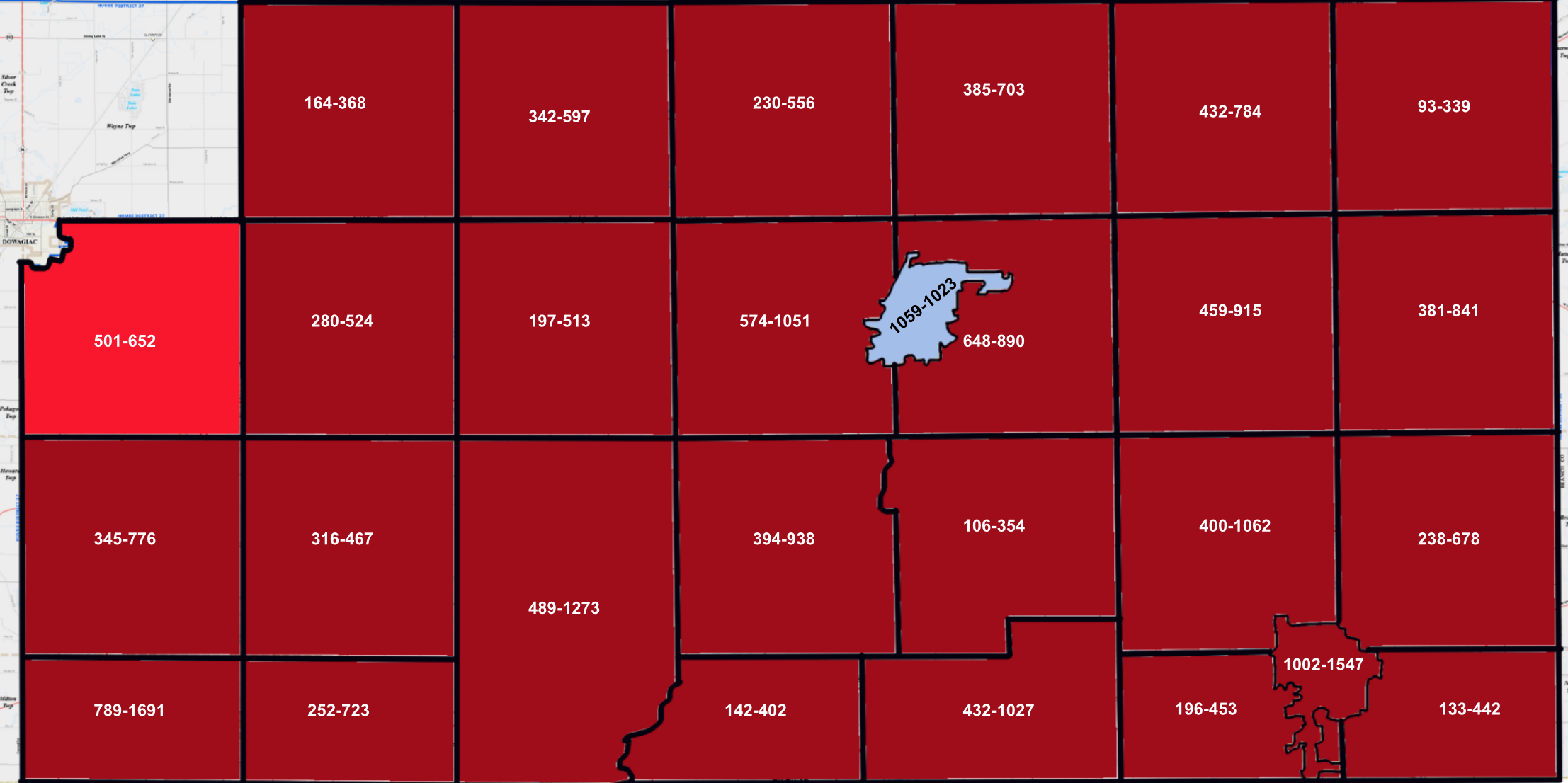
HD36 results by municipality (vote totals included)

=== District 37 ===
2022 Michigan's 37th House of Representatives district general election
Party	Candidate	Votes	%
Republican	Brad Paquette	22,392	64.69%
Democratic	Naomi Ludman	12,223	35.31%
Total votes		34,615	100.0

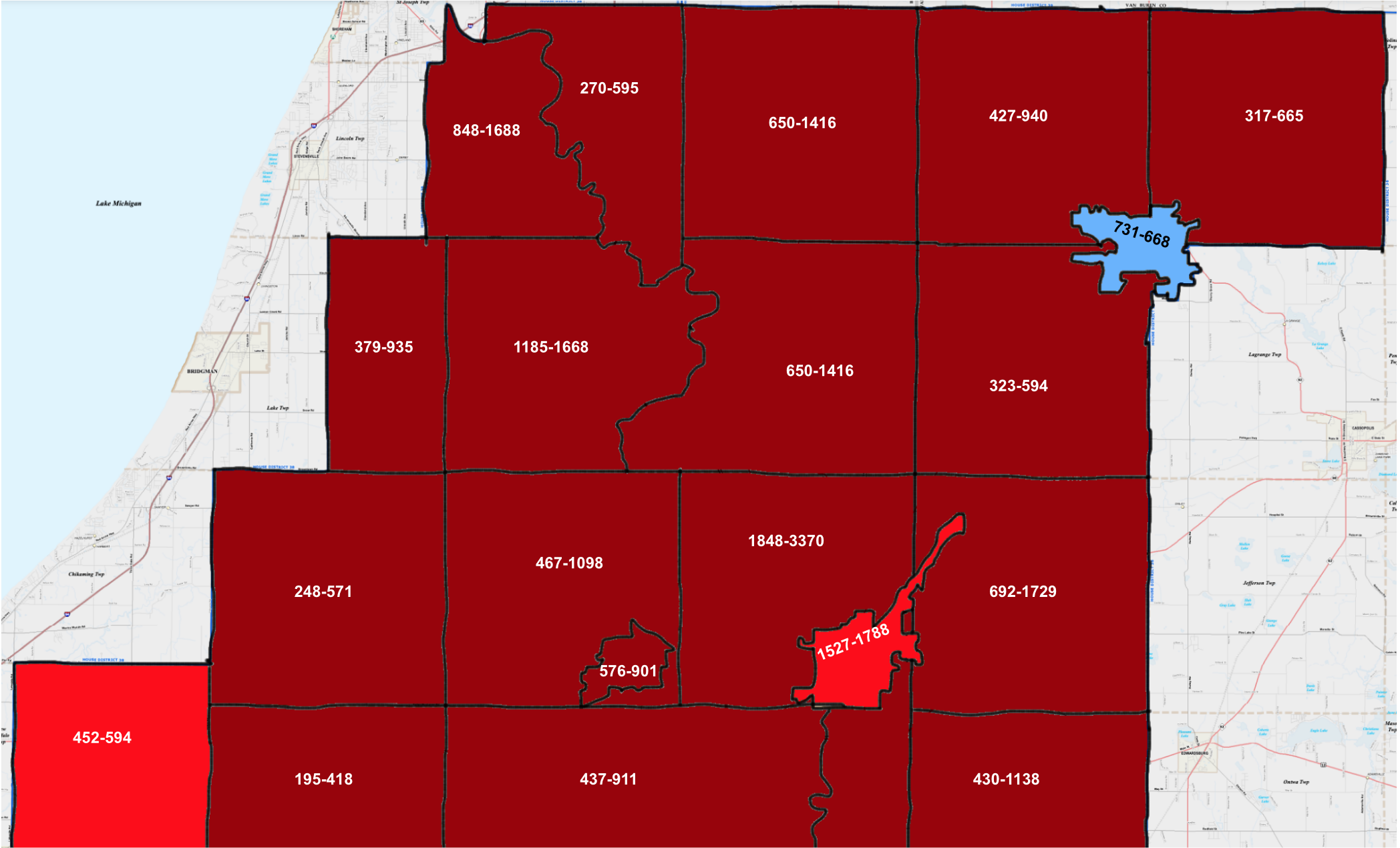
HD37 results by municipality (vote totals included)

=== District 38 ===
2022 Michigan's 38th House of Representatives district general election
Party	Candidate	Votes	%
Democratic	Joey Andrews	21,757	51.79%
Republican	Kevin Whiteford	20,252	48.21%
Total votes		42,009	100.0

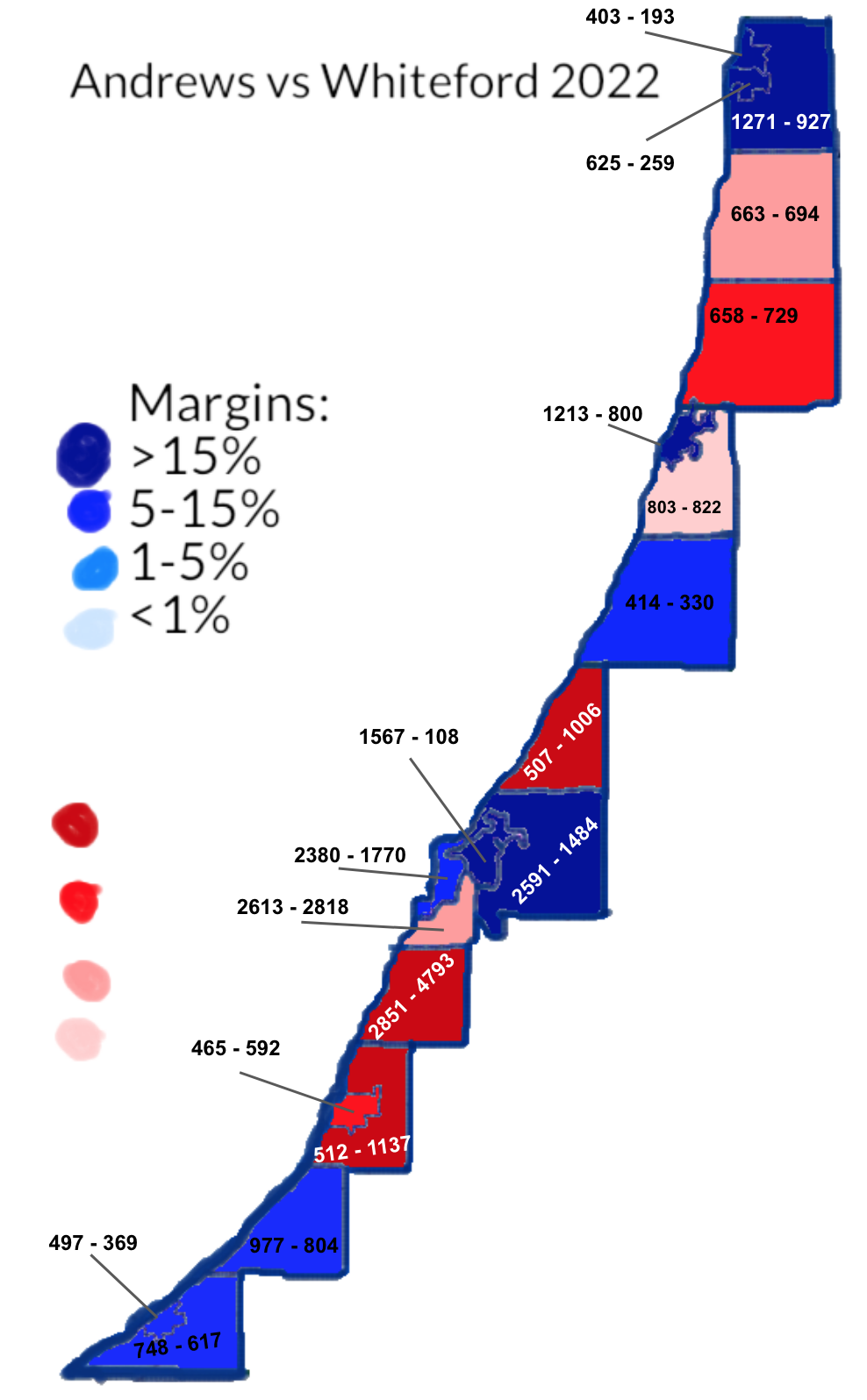
HD38 results by municipality (vote totals included)

=== District 39 ===
2022 Michigan's 39th House of Representatives district general election
Party	Candidate	Votes	%
Republican	Pauline Wendzel	22,797	62.71%
Democratic	Jared Polonowski	13,556	37.29%
Total votes		36,353	100.0

=== District 40 ===
2022 Michigan's 40th House of Representatives district general election
Party	Candidate	Votes	%
Democratic	Christine Morse	25,989	58.63%
Republican	Kelly Sackett	18,338	41.37%
Total votes		44,327	100.0

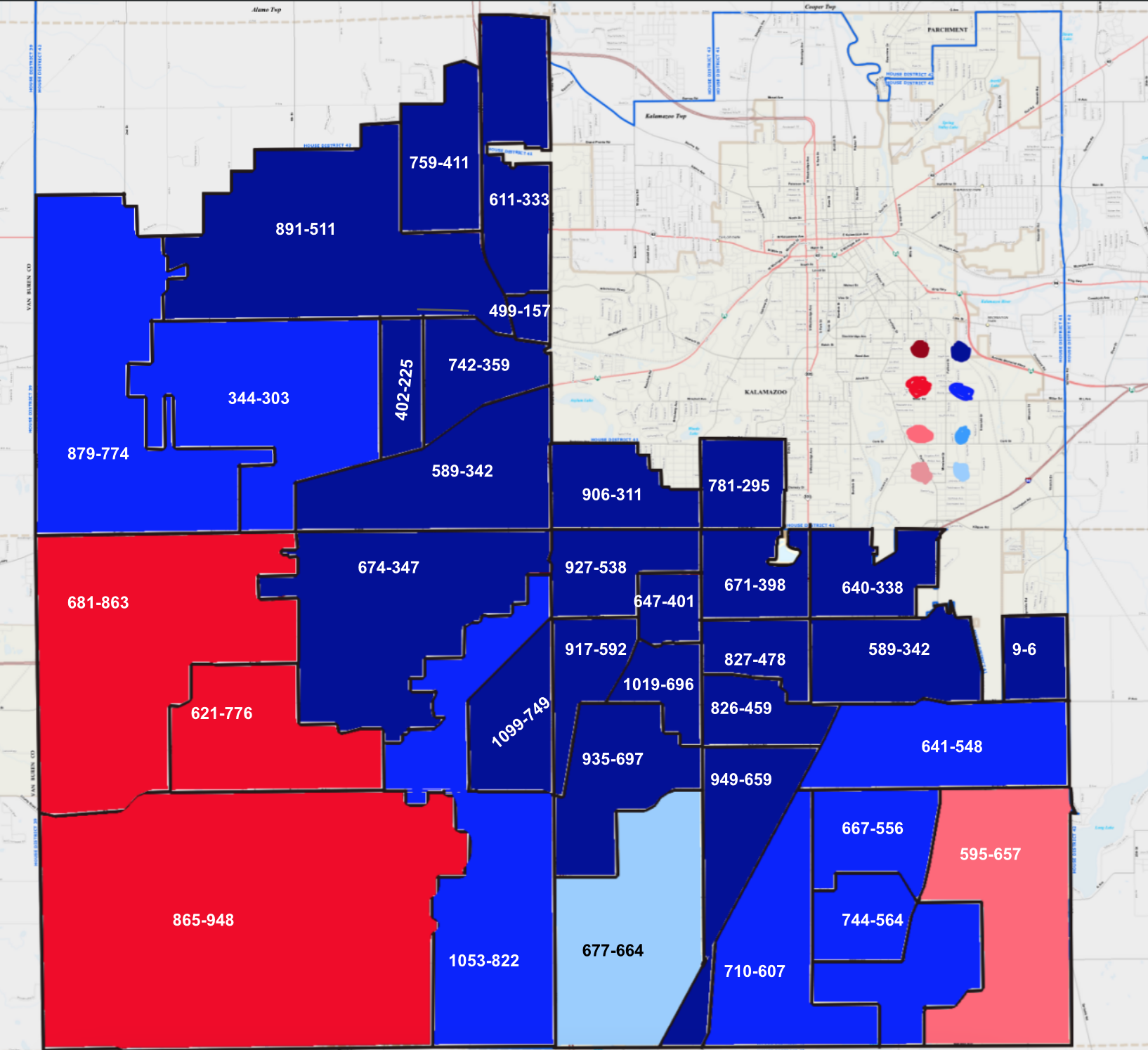
HD40 results by precinct (vote totals included)

=== District 41 ===
2022 Michigan's 41st House of Representatives district general election
Party	Candidate	Votes	%
Democratic	Julie Rogers	23,214	76.98%
Republican	Terry Haines	6,218	20.62%
Libertarian	Rafael Wolf	725	2.40%
Total votes		30,157	100.0

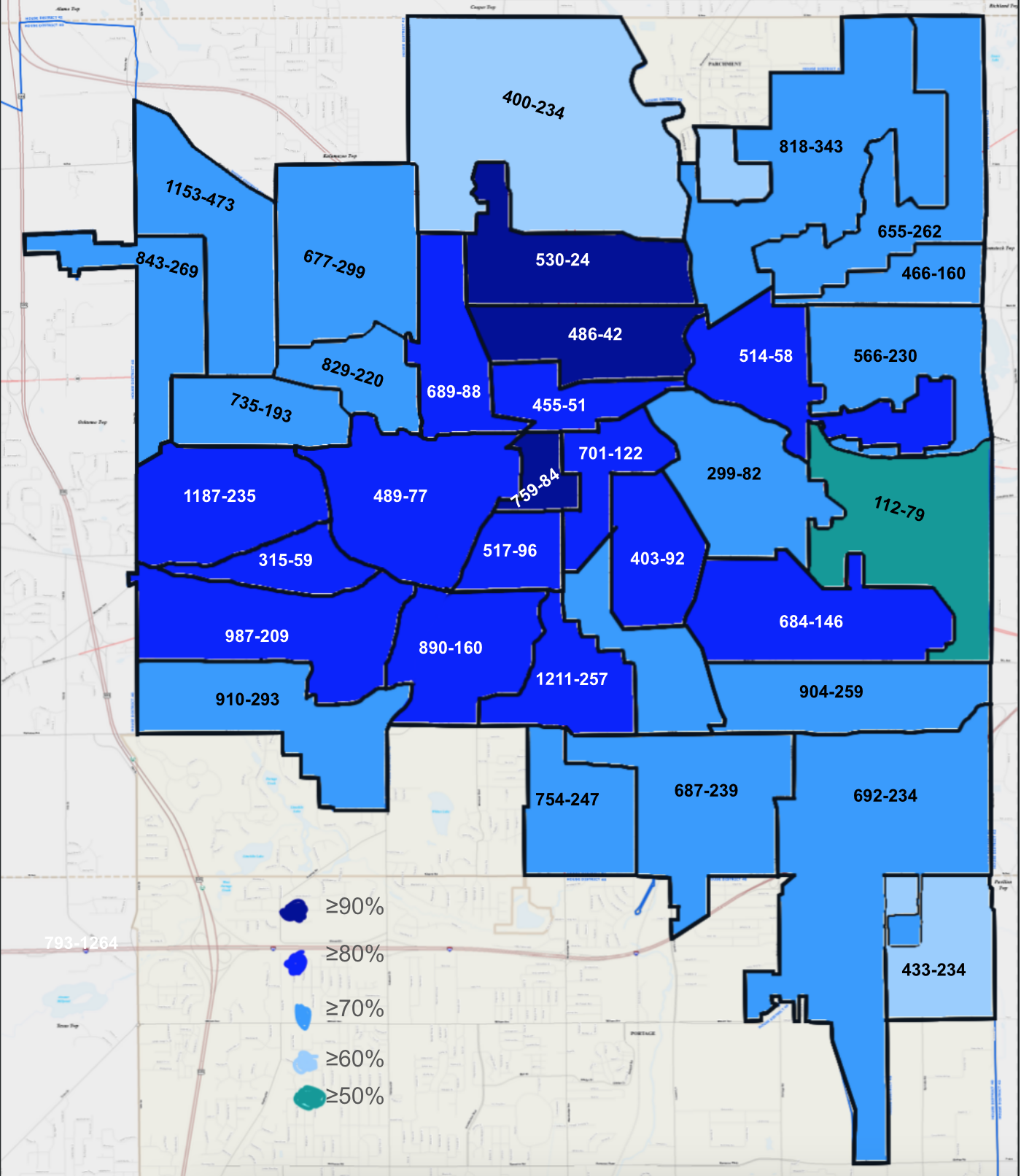
HD41 results by precinct

=== District 42 ===
2022 Michigan's 42nd House of Representatives district general election
Party	Candidate	Votes	%
Republican	Matt Hall	24,092	54.99%
Democratic	Justin Mendoza	19,719	45.01%
Total votes		43,811	100.0

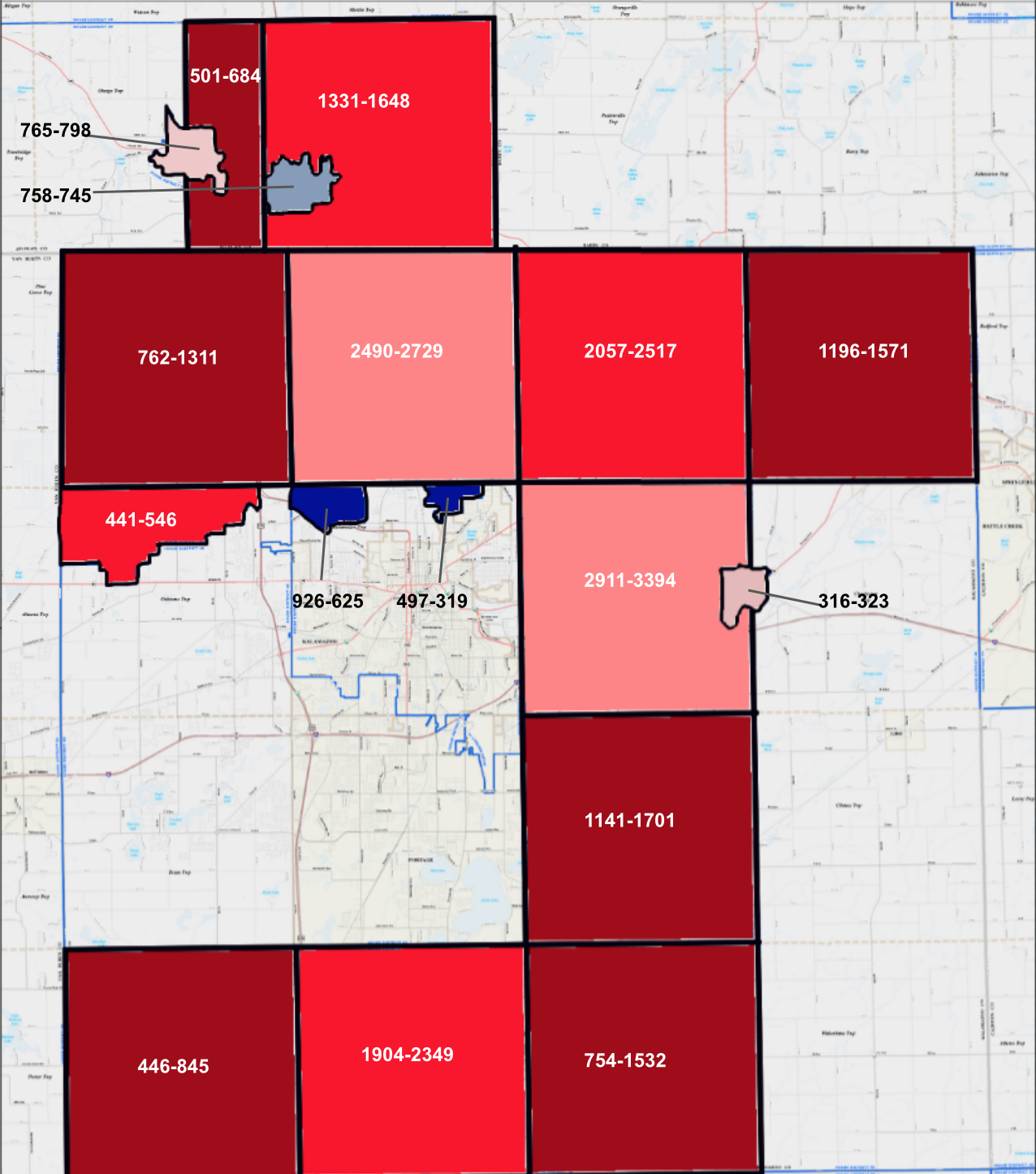
HD42 results by municipality (vote totals included)

=== District 43 ===
2022 Michigan's 43rd House of Representatives district general election
Party	Candidate	Votes	%
Republican	Rachelle Smit	30,920	70.77%
Democratic	Mark Ludwig	12,771	29.23%
Total votes		43,691	100.0

=== District 44 ===
2022 Michigan's 44th House of Representatives district general election
Party	Candidate	Votes	%
Democratic	Jim Haadsma	16,007	52.25%
Republican	Dave Morgan	14,631	47.75%
Total votes		30,638	100.0

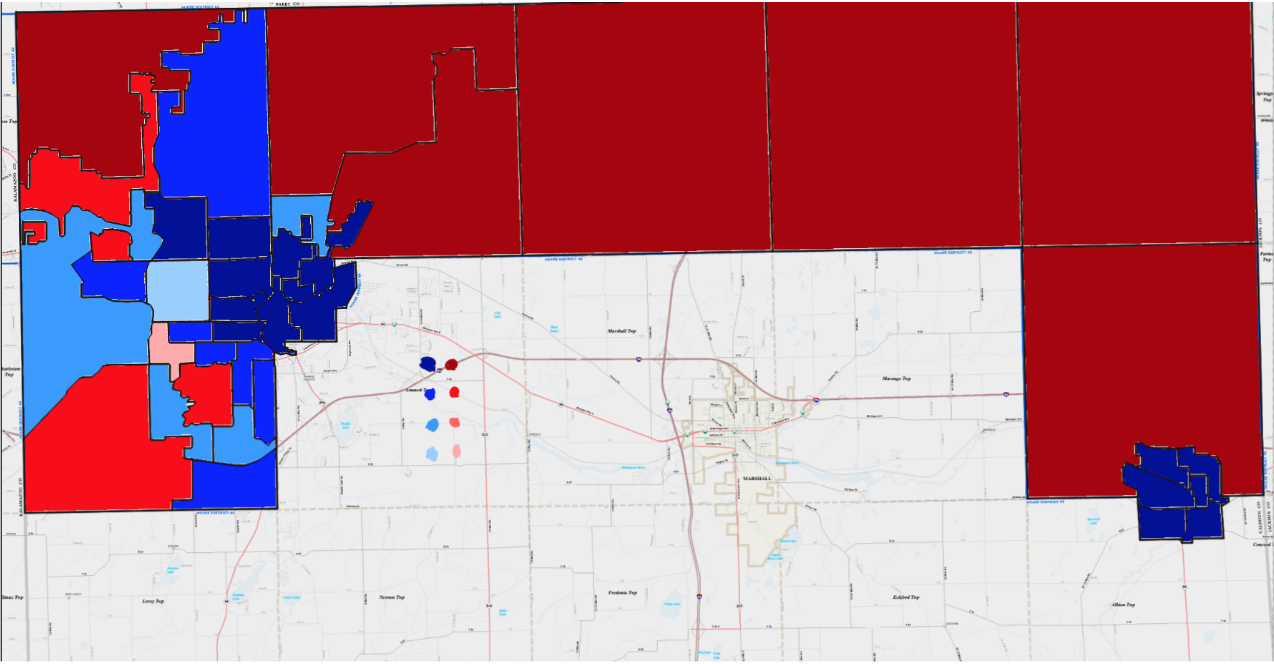
HD44 results by precinct

=== District 45 ===
2022 Michigan's 45th House of Representatives district general election
Party	Candidate	Votes	%
Republican	Sarah Lightner	27,506	67.62%
Democratic	Ron Hawkins	13,170	32.38%
Total votes		40,676	100.0

=== District 46 ===
2022 Michigan's 46th House of Representatives district general election
Party	Candidate	Votes	%
Republican	Kathy Schmaltz	16,806	54.37%
Democratic	Maurice Imhoff	14,104	45.63%
Total votes		30,910	100.0

=== District 47 ===
2022 Michigan's 47th House of Representatives district general election
Party	Candidate	Votes	%
Democratic	Carrie Rheingans	31,552	63.44%
Republican	Tina Bednarski-Lynch	18,187	36.56%
Total votes		49,739	100.0

=== District 48 ===
2022 Michigan's 48th House of Representatives district general election
Party	Candidate	Votes	%
Democratic	Jennifer Conlin	27,376	53.08%
Republican	Jason Woolford	23,622	45.80%
Green	Eric Borregard	579	1.12%
Total votes		51,577	100.0

=== District 49 ===
2022 Michigan's 49th House of Representatives district general election
Party	Candidate	Votes	%
Republican	Ann Bollin	25,118	55.78%
Democratic	Christina M. Kafkakis	19,910	44.22%
Total votes		45,028	100.0

=== District 50 ===
2022 Michigan's 50th House of Representatives district general election
Party	Candidate	Votes	%
Republican	Bob Bezotte	31,768	66.83%
Democratic	Glen Miller	15,767	33.17%
Total votes		47,535	100.0

=== District 51 ===
2022 Michigan's 51st House of Representatives district general election
Party	Candidate	Votes	%
Republican	Matt Maddock	27,530	57.79%
Democratic	Sarah May-Seward	20,110	42.21%
Total votes		47,640	100.0

=== District 52 ===
2022 Michigan's 52nd House of Representatives district general election
Party	Candidate	Votes	%
Republican	Mike Harris	26,890	58.56%
Democratic	Robin McGregor	19,031	41.44%
Total votes		45,921	100.0

=== District 53 ===
2022 Michigan's 53rd House of Representatives district general election
Party	Candidate	Votes	%
Democratic	Brenda Carter	18,829	67.44%
Republican	Anthony M. Bartolotta	9,092	32.56%
Total votes		27,921	100.0

=== District 54 ===
2022 Michigan's 54th House of Representatives district general election
Party	Candidate	Votes	%
Republican	Donni Steele	22,960	51.17%
Democratic	Shadia Martini	21,912	48.83%
Total votes		44,872	100.0

=== District 55 ===
2022 Michigan's 55th House of Representatives district general election
Party	Candidate	Votes	%
Republican	Mark Tisdel	23,210	51.80%
Democratic	Patricia Bernard	21,601	48.20%
Total votes		44,811	100.0

=== District 56 ===
2022 Michigan's 56th House of Representatives district general election
Party	Candidate	Votes	%
Democratic	Sharon MacDonell	24,630	57.93%
Republican	Mark Gunn	17,887	42.07%
Total votes		42,517	100.0

=== District 57 ===
2022 Michigan's 57th House of Representatives district general election
Party	Candidate	Votes	%
Republican	Thomas Kuhn	17,606	52.64%
Democratic	Aisha Farooqi	15,842	47.36%
Total votes		33,448	100.0

=== District 58 ===
Results by precinct Shannon: 40–50%; 50–60%; 60–70%; Smith: 40–50%; 50–60%; 60–70%; Tie: 40–50%

2022 Michigan's 58th House of Representatives district general election
Party	Candidate	Votes	%
Democratic	Nate Shannon	18,122	51.32%
Republican	Michelle Smith	17,183	48.66%
Write-In	Giovanni Ndrea	5	0.01%
Total votes		35,310	100.0

=== District 59 ===
2022 Michigan's 59th House of Representatives district general election
Party	Candidate	Votes	%
Republican	Doug Wozniak	28,255	65.20%
Democratic	James Diez	15,083	34.80%
Total votes		43,338	100.0

=== District 60 ===
2022 Michigan's 60th House of Representatives district general election
Party	Candidate	Votes	%
Republican	Joseph Aragona	24,389	58.42%
Democratic	Linda Rose Clor	17,360	41.58%
Total votes		41,749	100.0

=== District 61 ===
2022 Michigan's 61st House of Representatives district general election
Party	Candidate	Votes	%
Democratic	Denise Mentzer	20,126	52.03%
Republican	Mike Aiello	18,559	47.97%
Total votes		38,685	100.0

=== District 62 ===
2022 Michigan's 62nd House of Representatives district general election
Party	Candidate	Votes	%
Republican	Alicia St. Germaine	21,522	53.42%
Democratic	Michael Brooks	18,766	46.58%
Total votes		40,288	100.0

=== District 63 ===
2022 Michigan's 63rd House of Representatives district general election
Party	Candidate	Votes	%
Republican	Jay DeBoyer	28,050	64.26%
Democratic	Kelly L. Noland	15,598	35.74%
Total votes		43,648	100.0

=== District 64 ===
2022 Michigan's 64th House of Representatives district general election
Party	Candidate	Votes	%
Republican	Andrew Beeler	23,216	61.31%
Democratic	Charles Howell	14,653	38.69%
Total votes		37,869	100.0

=== District 65 ===
2022 Michigan's 65th House of Representatives district general election
Party	Candidate	Votes	%
Republican	Jaime Greene	31,435	71.85%
Democratic	Mark Lingeman	12,317	28.15%
Total votes		43,752	100.0

=== District 66 ===
2022 Michigan's 66th House of Representatives district general election
Party	Candidate	Votes	%
Republican	Josh Schriver	30,841	64.65%
Democratic	Emily C. Busch	16,865	35.35%
Total votes		47,706	100.0

=== District 67 ===
2022 Michigan's 67th House of Representatives district general election
Party	Candidate	Votes	%
Republican	Phil Green	25,408	60.50%
Democratic	Brian A. LaJoie	16,573	39.47%
Write-In	Gabriel Bernard Lossing	13	0.03%
Total votes		41,994	100.0

=== District 68 ===
2022 Michigan's 68th House of Representatives district general election
Party	Candidate	Votes	%
Republican	David Martin	23,145	54.72%
Democratic	Cheri Hardmon	19,149	45.28%
Total votes		42,294	100.0

=== District 69 ===
2022 Michigan's 69th House of Representatives district general election
Party	Candidate	Votes	%
Democratic	Jasper Martus	21,007	56.31%
Republican	Jesse Couch	15,311	41.04%
Libertarian	Adam Blake Childress	991	2.66%
Total votes		37,309	100.0

=== District 70 ===
2022 Michigan's 70th House of Representatives district general election
Party	Candidate	Votes	%
Democratic	Cynthia Neeley	21,277	82.03%
Republican	Tim Butler	4,660	17.97%
Total votes		25,937	100.0

=== District 71 ===
2022 Michigan's 71st House of Representatives district general election
Party	Candidate	Votes	%
Republican	Brian BeGole	25,156	57.74%
Democratic	Mark D. Zacharda	18,408	42.26%
Total votes		43,564	100.0

=== District 72 ===
2022 Michigan's 72nd House of Representatives district general election
Party	Candidate	Votes	%
Republican	Mike Mueller	26,452	58.09%
Democratic	Stacy Taylor	19,084	41.91%
Total votes		45,536	100.0

=== District 73 ===
2022 Michigan's 73rd House of Representatives district general election
Party	Candidate	Votes	%
Democratic	Julie Brixie	21,096	57.33%
Republican	Norm Shinkle	15,700	42.67%
Total votes		36,796	100.0

=== District 74 ===
2022 Michigan's 74th House of Representatives district general election
Party	Candidate	Votes	%
Democratic	Kara Hope	24,831	69.15%
Republican	Jennifer Sokol	11,077	30.85%
Total votes		35,908	100.0

=== District 75 ===
2022 Michigan's 75th House of Representatives district general election
Party	Candidate	Votes	%
Democratic	Penelope Tsernoglou	26,106	60.00%
Republican	Chris Stewart	17,406	40.00%
Total votes		43,512	100.0

=== District 76 ===
2022 Michigan's 76th House of Representatives district general election
Party	Candidate	Votes	%
Democratic	Angela Witwer	24,774	55.75%
Republican	Jeremy Whittum	19,667	44.25%
Total votes		44,441	100.0

=== District 77 ===
2022 Michigan's 77th House of Representatives district general election
Party	Candidate	Votes	%
Democratic	Emily Dievendorf	25,269	62.42%
Republican	John J. Magoola	15,214	37.58%
Total votes		40,483	100.0

=== District 78 ===
2022 Michigan's 78th House of Representatives district general election
Party	Candidate	Votes	%
Republican	Gina Johnsen	25,765	65.56%
Democratic	Leah M. Groves	13,533	34.44%
Total votes		39,298	100.0

=== District 79 ===
2022 Michigan's 79th House of Representatives district general election
Party	Candidate	Votes	%
Republican	Angela Rigas	29,510	65.77%
Democratic	Kimberly Y. Kennedy-Barrington	15,360	34.23%
Total votes		44,870	100.0

=== District 80 ===
2022 Michigan's 80th House of Representatives district general election
Party	Candidate	Votes	%
Democratic	Phil Skaggs	23,764	56.30%
Republican	Jeffrey Johnson	18,442	43.70%
Total votes		42,206	100.0

=== District 81 ===
2022 Michigan's 81st House of Representatives district general election
Party	Candidate	Votes	%
Democratic	Rachel Hood	26,169	55.67%
Republican	Lynn Afendoulis	20,835	44.33%
Total votes		47,004	100.0

=== District 82 ===
2022 Michigan's 82nd House of Representatives district general election
Party	Candidate	Votes	%
Democratic	Kristian Grant	23,976	74.01%
Republican	Ryan Malinoski	7,945	24.52%
Green	Gerard W. Akkerhuis	475	1.47%
Total votes		32,396	100.0

=== District 83 ===
2022 Michigan's 83rd House of Representatives district general election
Party	Candidate	Votes	%
Democratic	John Fitzgerald	15,319	52.76%
Republican	Lisa DeKryger	12,964	44.64%
Libertarian	Alex Avery	755	2.60%
Total votes		29,038	100.0

=== District 84 ===
2022 Michigan's 84th House of Representatives district general election
Party	Candidate	Votes	%
Democratic	Carol Glanville	22,485	55.56%
Republican	Mike Milanowski Jr.	17,983	44.44%
Total votes		40,468	100.0

=== District 85 ===
2022 Michigan's 85th House of Representatives district general election
Party	Candidate	Votes	%
Republican	Bradley Slagh	32,848	70.08%
Democratic	Todd Avery	13,336	28.45%
Libertarian	Greg Parlmer II	688	1.47%
Total votes		46,872	100.0

=== District 86 ===
Results by county De Boer: 50–60%; 60–70%

Results by precinct De Boer: 50–60%; 60–70%; 70–80%; Jackson: 50–60%; 60–70%; 70–80%

2022 Michigan's 86th House of Representatives district general election
Party	Candidate	Votes	%
Republican	Nancy De Boer	22,091	56.19%
Democratic	Larry D. Jackson	17,222	43.81%
Total votes		39,313	100.0

=== District 87 ===
2022 Michigan's 87th House of Representatives district general election
Party	Candidate	Votes	%
Democratic	Will Snyder	19,274	61.58%
Republican	Michael L. Haueisen	12,026	38.42%
Total votes		31,300	100.0

=== District 88 ===
2022 Michigan's 88th House of Representatives district general election
Party	Candidate	Votes	%
Republican	Greg VanWoerkom	27,448	56.30%
Democratic	Christine Baker	20,416	41.88%
Libertarian	Marv Bolthouse	886	1.82%
Total votes		48,750	100.0

=== District 89 ===
2022 Michigan's 89th House of Representatives district general election
Party	Candidate	Votes	%
Republican	Luke Meerman	27,497	68.96%
Democratic	Sharon McConnon	12,374	31.04%
Total votes		39,871	100.0

=== District 90 ===
2022 Michigan's 90th House of Representatives district general election
Party	Candidate	Votes	%
Republican	Bryan Posthumus	29,448	62.07%
Democratic	Meagan Hintz	17,992	37.93%
Total votes		47,440	100.0

=== District 91 ===
2022 Michigan's 91st House of Representatives district general election
Party	Candidate	Votes	%
Republican	Pat Outman	26,680	68.30%
Democratic	Tammy L. DeVries	12,381	31.70%
Total votes		39,061	100.0

=== District 92 ===
2022 Michigan's 92nd House of Representatives district general election
Party	Candidate	Votes	%
Republican	Jerry Neyer	18,080	55.53%
Democratic	Anthony D. Feig	13,809	42.41%
Libertarian	Gregory Black	670	2.06%
Total votes		32,559	100.0

=== District 93 ===
2022 Michigan's 93rd House of Representatives district general election
Party	Candidate	Votes	%
Republican	Graham Filler	25,731	64.41%
Democratic	Jeffrey Lockwood	14,215	35.59%
Total votes		39,946	100.0

=== District 94 ===
2022 Michigan's 94th House of Representatives district general election
Party	Candidate	Votes	%
Democratic	Amos O'Neal	21,141	68.44%
Republican	James Shepler	9,749	31.56%
Total votes		30,890	100.0

=== District 95 ===
2022 Michigan's 95th House of Representatives district general election
Party	Candidate	Votes	%
Republican	Bill G. Schuette	26,718	60.59%
Democratic	Matthew Dawson	17,379	39.41%
Total votes		44,097	100.0

=== District 96 ===
Results by precinct Beson: 50–60%; 60–70%; 70–80%; Coonan: 50–60%; 60–70%

2022 Michigan's 96th House of Representatives district general election
Party	Candidate	Votes	%
Republican	Timothy Beson	23,373	55.32%
Democratic	Kim J. Coonan	18,881	44.68%
Total votes		42,254	100.0

=== District 97 ===
2022 Michigan's 97th House of Representatives district general election
Party	Candidate	Votes	%
Republican	Matthew Bierlein	28,024	66.64%
Democratic	Paul M. Whitney	14,028	33.36%
Total votes		42,052	100.0

=== District 98 ===
2022 Michigan's 98th House of Representatives district general election
Party	Candidate	Votes	%
Republican	Gregory Alexander	29,450	71.85%
Democratic	Robert Mroczek	11,537	28.15%
Total votes		40,987	100.0

=== District 99 ===
2022 Michigan's 99th House of Representatives district general election
Party	Candidate	Votes	%
Republican	Mike Hoadley	28,126	67.65%
Democratic	Kenneth A. Kish	13,449	32.35%
Total votes		41,575	100.0

=== District 100 ===
2022 Michigan's 100th House of Representatives district general election
Party	Candidate	Votes	%
Republican	Tom Kunse	26,911	68.37%
Democratic	Nate Bailey	12,452	31.63%
Total votes		39,363	100.0

=== District 101 ===
2022 Michigan's 101st House of Representatives district general election
Party	Candidate	Votes	%
Republican	Joseph D. Fox	27,566	67.78%
Democratic	Amanda Siggins	13,101	32.22%
Total votes		40,667	100.0

=== District 102 ===
2022 Michigan's 102nd House of Representatives district general election
Party	Candidate	Votes	%
Republican	Curt VanderWall	26,690	61.08%
Democratic	Brian Hosticka	17,010	38.92%
Total votes		43,700	100.0

=== District 103 ===
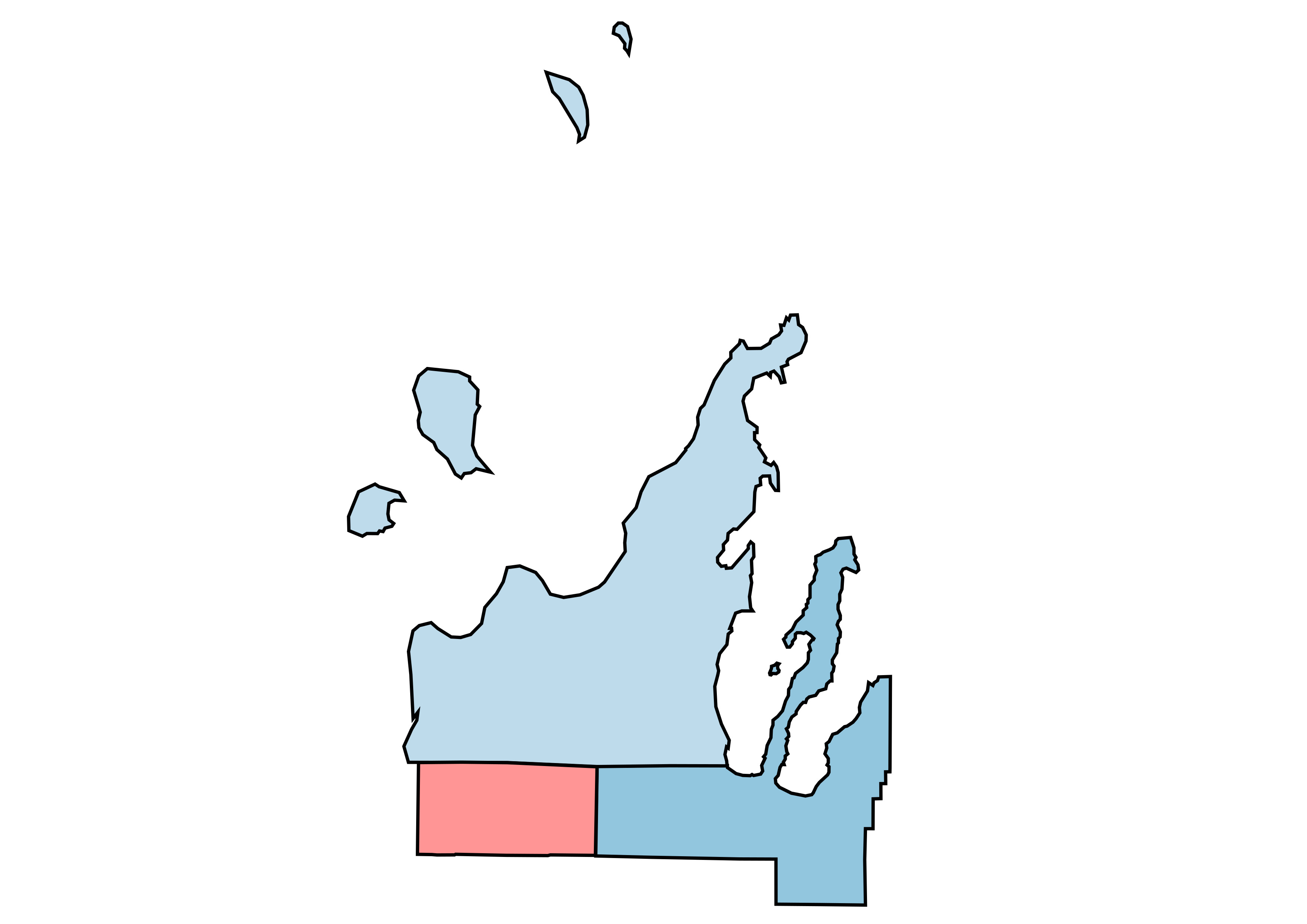
HD103 results by county

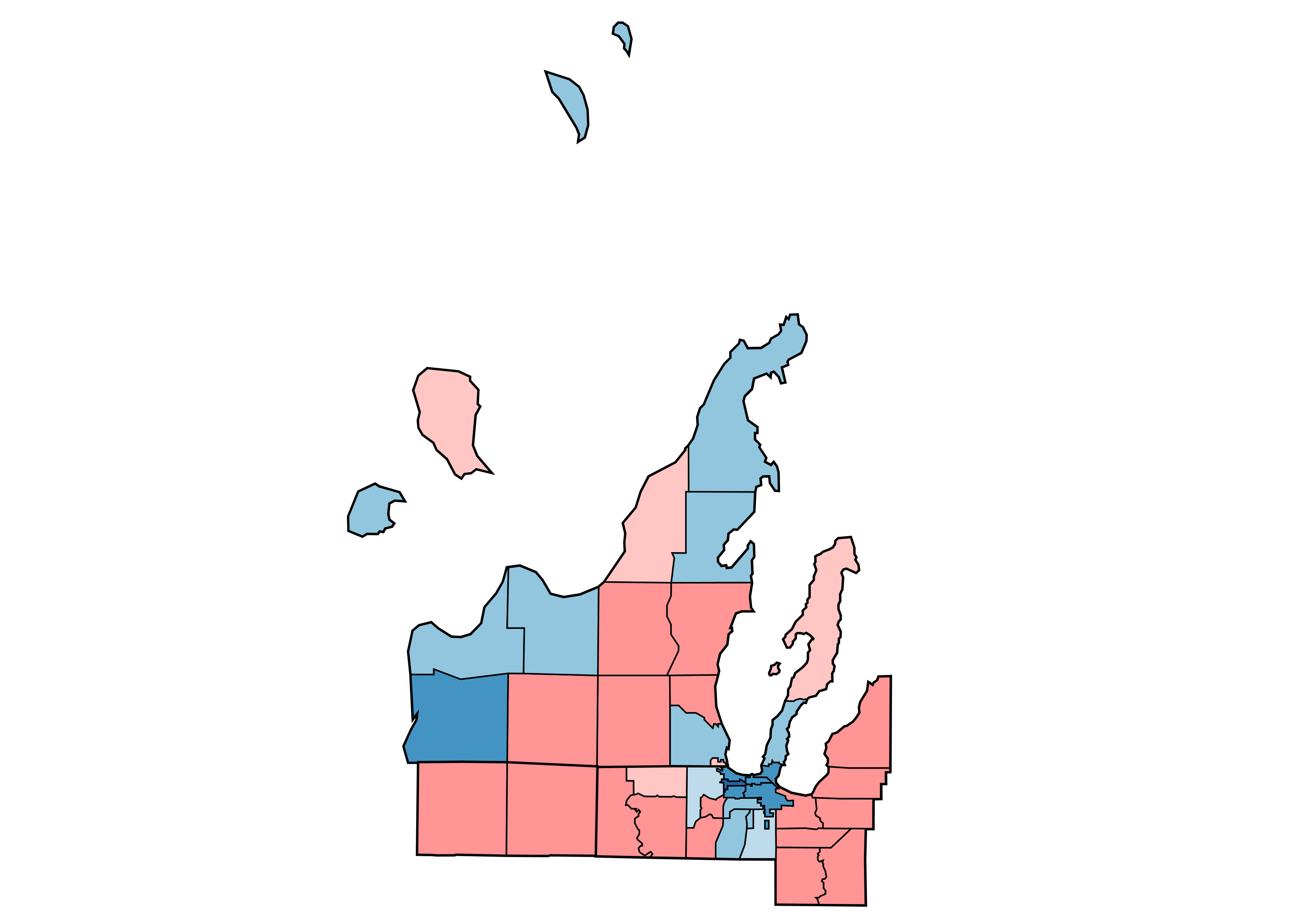
HD103 results by precinct

2022 Michigan's 103rd House of Representatives district general election
Party	Candidate	Votes	%
Democratic	Betsy Coffia	27,805	49.84%
Republican	Jack O'Malley	27,040	48.47%
Libertarian	Courtney Evans	945	1.69%
Total votes		55,790	100.0

=== District 104 ===
2022 Michigan's 104th House of Representatives district general election
Party	Candidate	Votes	%
Republican	John Roth	29,832	62.69%
Democratic	Cathy Albro	17,758	37.31%
Total votes		47,590	100.0

=== District 105 ===
2022 Michigan's 105th House of Representatives district general election
Party	Candidate	Votes	%
Republican	Ken Borton	30,495	69.41%
Democratic	Adam J. Wojdan	13,438	30.59%
Total votes		43,933	100.0

=== District 106 ===
2022 Michigan's 106th House of Representatives district general election
Party	Candidate	Votes	%
Republican	Cam Cavitt	30,306	64.98%
Democratic	Marie M. Fielder	16,332	35.02%
Total votes		46,638	100.0

=== District 107 ===
2022 Michigan's 107th House of Representatives district general election
Party	Candidate	Votes	%
Republican	Neil W. Friske	26,867	56.59%
Democratic	Jodi Decker	20,610	43.41%
Total votes		47,477	100.0

=== District 108 ===
2022 Michigan's 108th House of Representatives district general election
Party	Candidate	Votes	%
Republican	David Prestin	25,076	65.70%
Democratic	Chris Lopez	13,092	34.30%
Total votes		38,168	100.0

=== District 109 ===
Results by county Hill: 50–60%; Wagner: 50–60%; 60–70%

Results by precinct Hill: 50–60%; 60–70%; 70–80%; Wagner: 50–60%; 60–70%; 70–80%; 80–90%; Tie: 50%

2022 Michigan's 109th House of Representatives district general election
Party	Candidate	Votes	%
Democratic	Jenn Hill	21,899	52.98%
Republican	Melody Wagner	19,438	47.02%
Total votes		41,337	100.0

=== District 110 ===
2022 Michigan's 110th House of Representatives district general election
Party	Candidate	Votes	%
Republican	Gregory Markkanen	25,462	63.35%
Democratic	Casey VerBerkmoes	14,732	36.65%
Total votes		40,194	100.0

== See also ==
- 2022 Michigan Senate election
- 2022 United States state legislative elections
