= Fran Amos =

American politician (born 1939)

Member of the Michigan State House of Representatives from the 43rd district
- In office 2003–2006
- Preceded by: Clarence E. Phillips
- Succeeded by: Gail Haines

Personal details
- Born: January 12, 1939 (age 87) Oakland County, Michigan, U.S.
- Party: Republican
- Spouse: Ed
- Children: 2
- Education: Oakland University (BS)

Fran Amos (born January 12, 1939) is an American politician and businesswoman who served as a member of the Michigan State House of Representatives, representing the 43rd District from 2003 to 2009.

== Early life and education ==
Amos was born in Oakland County, Michigan. She earned a Bachelor of Science degree in management from Oakland University in 1980.

== Career ==
Prior to her service in the House of Representatives, she was an Oakland County, Michigan Commissioner for four terms. During her service for Oakland County, she was widely credited with the privatization of mental health services. Amos retired as an executive from Bell System.

During her tenure, Amos was one of four Republican women serving in the Michigan Legislature and the only female Republican serving on the House Appropriations Committee. Amos represented the 43rd District from 2003 to 2009.

=== Candidacy for Michigan Senate ===
In 2010, Amos unsuccessfully ran for the Michigan Senate in District 26, which covers the townships of Waterford, Springfield, Groveland and Brandon in Oakland County. In Genesee County it covers the townships of Grand Blanc, Atlas, Davison, Forest, Mt Morris, Thetford, Richfield and Vienna as well as the cities of Burton, Clio, Davison and Mt Morris and the villages of Goodrich and Otisville.

== Personal life ==
Amos and her husband, Ed, have two children.

== Electoral history ==
Michigan House 43rd District Election Results, 2002–present
2002 Candidate	Party	Popular votes	Vote percentage
Fran Amos	Republican	14,788	52.91%
Betty Fortino	Democrat	13,157	47.08%
2004 Candidate	Party	Popular votes	Vote percentage
Fran Amos	Republican	23,665	56.53%
Scott Hudson	Democrat	18,193	43.46%
2006 Candidate	Party	Popular votes	Vote percentage
Fran Amos	Republican	19,292	59.00%
Kellie Riddell	Democrat	13,406	40.99%
