= William Sowerby (politician) =

American politician

Member of the Michigan House of Representatives from the 31st district
- In office January 1, 2017 – January 1, 2023
- Preceded by: Marilyn Lane
- Succeeded by: Reggie Miller

Personal details
- Born: September 16, 1956 (age 70)
- Party: Democratic
- Spouse: Martha Higgins
- Children: 1
- Education: Wayne State University
- Website: Bill Sowbery

William J. Sowerby (born September 16, 1956) is an American politician from Michigan. Sowerby was Democratic member of Michigan House of Representatives from District 31.

== Early life ==
On September 16, 1956, Sowerby was born. Sowerby grew up in St. Clair Shores, Michigan.

== Education ==
In 1978, Sowerby earned a BA degree from Wayne State University.

== Career ==
Sowerby was an automotive sales representative.

On November 8, 2016, Sowerby won the election and became a Democratic member of the Michigan House of Representatives. Sowerby defeated Lisa Valerio-Nowc and Mike Saliba with 56.16% of the votes. On November 6, 2018, as an incumbent, Sowerby won the election and continued serving District 31. Sowerby defeated Lisa Valerio-Nowc by 59.89% of the votes.

== Personal life ==
Sowerby's wife is Martha. He has a son from a previous marriage.

Political offices
Preceded by Marilyn Lane	Michigan Representatives; 31st District; 2017–2023	Succeeded by Reggie Miller
