= Andrea Schroeder =

American politician (1964–2021)

Member of the Michigan House of Representatives from the 43rd district
- In office January 1, 2019 – October 1, 2021
- Preceded by: Jim Tedder
- Succeeded by: Mike Harris

Personal details
- Born: June 2, 1964 Detroit, Michigan, U.S.
- Died: October 1, 2021 (aged 57)
- Party: Republican
- Spouse: Mark
- Children: 3
- Education: Miami University (BS); Wheelock College (MS)

Andrea Kathleen Schroeder (née MacIntosh; June 2, 1964 – October 1, 2021) was an American politician who served as a Republican member of the Michigan House of Representatives from 2019 to 2021.

== Education ==
Schroeder earned a Bachelor of Science degree in child and family studies and early childhood education from Miami University. In 1987, Schroeder attended Wheelock College. In 2006, Schroeder graduated from the Michigan Political Leadership program from Michigan State University.

== Career ==
Prior to entering politics, Schroeder was a teacher.

In 2012, Schroeder became a member of the board of trustees of Chartered Township of Independence until 2018.

On August 5, 2014, Schroeder lost the Republican primary for the 43rd district in the Michigan House of Representatives. Schroeder had 28.91% of the votes and she was defeated by Jim Tedder with 30.54% of the votes.

On November 6, 2018, Schroeder won the election and became a Republican member of the Michigan House of Representatives for the 43rd district. Schroeder defeated Nicole Breadon with 56.52% of the votes.

Schroeder was the Vice chairperson of the Financial Services Committee.

Before her election to the state legislature, Schroeder was a teacher and operated a consulting business.

== Personal life ==
Schroeder and her husband, Mark, had three children. Schroeder and her family lived in Independence Township, Michigan.

Schroeder was diagnosed with stomach cancer in August 2018. She had a gastrectomy in 2019. Schroeder died on October 1, 2021, at the age of 57, after a recurrence of the cancer.

== See also ==
- 2018 Michigan House of Representatives election
- 2020 Michigan House of Representatives election

Political offices
Preceded by Jim Tedder	Michigan Representatives; 43rd District; 2019–2021	Succeeded by Mike Harris
