= Marilyn Lane =

Member of Michigan House of Representatives

Member of the Michigan House of Representatives from the 31st district
- In office January 1, 2011 – January 1, 2017
- Preceded by: Fred Miller
- Succeeded by: William Sowerby

Personal details
- Born: February 10, 1959 (age 67) Detroit, Michigan
- Party: Democratic
- Spouse: James
- Occupation: Politician, business woman

Marilyn Lane is an American politician and business woman from Michigan. Lane is a former Democratic member of Michigan House of Representatives from District 31.

== Early life ==
On February 10, 1959, Lane was born Detroit, Michigan. Lane's father was Nino Messana, an entrepreneur. Lane's mother was Louise Messana, an office manager.

== Education ==
Lane attended Macomb Community College in Macomb County, Michigan.

== Career ==
In 1985, Lane became the President of Lane Development, until 2006.

In 2003, Lane became the mayor of Fraser, Michigan, until 2007.

In 2008, Lane became the Vice chairwoman of Macomb County Charter Commission.

Lane was a Business Development Representative and Chairperson of Alternative Energy Division of Roncelli Inc.

On November 2, 2010, Lane won the election and became a Democratic member of Michigan House of Representatives for District 31. Lane defeated Dan Tollis, James Miller, and Dan Elles with 50.92% of the votes. On November 6, 2012, as an incumbent, Lane won the election and continued serving District 31.Lane defeated Lynn Evans and James Miller with 61.74% of the votes. On November 4, 2014, as an incumbent, Lane won the election and continued serving District 31. Lane defeated Phil Rode with 61.07% of the votes.

In 2016, due to term limits, Lane did not seek for election. The seat for District 31 was succeeded by William Sowerby.

In 2013, Lane served on a Michigan House Democrat task force created to help better address the needs of Michigan veterans. In October 2017, she announced plans to run for the Michigan Senate in the 9th district.

== Electoral history ==
Michigan House of Representatives 31st District Democratic Primary, 2010
Party	Candidate	Votes	%	±%
Democratic	Marilyn Lane	4,111	74.3	N/A
Democratic	Jim Shamalay	1,423	25.3	N/A

Michigan House of Representatives 31st District election, 2010
Party	Candidate	Votes	%	±%
Democratic	Marilyn Lane	12,710	50.9	−15.2
Republican	Dan Tollis	10,874	43.6	+12.9
Libertarian	James Miller	792	3.2	0.0
Independent	Dan Elles	584	2.3	N/A
Majority		1,836	7.3	−28.1
Turnout		24,960		−37.5
Democratic hold				

Michigan House of Representatives 31st District election, 2012
Party	Candidate	Votes	%	±%
Democratic	Marilyn Lane (I)	24,443	61.7	+10.8
Republican	Lynn Evans	13,404	33.9	−9.7
Libertarian	James Miller	1,742	4.4	+1.2
Majority		11,039	27.8	+20.5
Turnout		39,589		+58.9
Democratic hold				

Michigan House of Representatives 31st District Democratic Primary, 2014
Party	Candidate	Votes	%	±%
Democratic	Marilyn Lane (I)	3,803	69.8	−30.2
Democratic	Kathy Blanke	1,004	18.4	N/A
Democratic	Juliana Goldwater	643	11.8	N/A

Michigan House of Representatives 31st District election, 2014
Party	Candidate	Votes	%	±%
Democratic	Marilyn Lane (I)	15,769	61.1	−0.6
Republican	Phil Rode	10,054	38.9	+5.0
Majority		5,715	22.2	−5.6
Turnout		25,823		−34.8
Democratic hold				

== Personal life ==
Lane's husband is James. They have a child. Lane and her family live in Fraser, Michigan.

== See also ==
- 2010 Michigan House of Representatives election
- 2012 Michigan House of Representatives election
- 2014 Michigan House of Representatives election
