= Shannon Wayne =

American politician

Member-elect of the Michigan House of Representatives from the 31st district
- Assuming office January 1, 2027
- Succeeding: Reggie Miller

Personal details
- Party: Democratic
- Education: Wayne State University; Lawrence Technological University
- Website: Campaign website

Shannon Dare Wayne is an American politician who is the member-elect for the 31st district of the Michigan House of Representatives. She was elected at the 2026 election. She was mayor pro tem of Milan, Michigan.
