= Lucille H. McCollough =

American politician

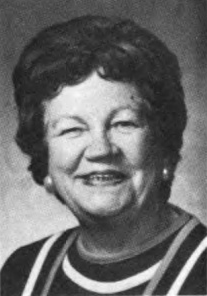

Member of the Michigan House of Representatives from the 31st district
- In office January 1, 1965 – 1982
- Preceded by: District established
- Succeeded by: William J. Runco

Member of the Michigan House of Representatives from the Wayne County 16th district
- In office January 1, 1955 – 1964
- Succeeded by: District abolished

Personal details
- Born: December 30, 1905 White Rock, Michigan, US
- Died: March 14, 1996 (aged 90) Dearborn, Michigan, US
- Party: Democratic
- Spouse: Clarence McCollough
- Children: 3, including Patrick
- Education: Western State Teachers College

Lucille Hanna McCollough (December 30, 1905 – March 14, 1996) was a teacher, stenographer, secretary, and politician in Michigan. She served in the Michigan legislature from 1955 - 1983. For part of that time her son Patrick H. McCollough served in the Michigan Senate.

== Early life ==
McCollough was born on December 30, 1905, in White Rock, Michigan to parents H. William and Stella Hanna McCollough.

She graduated from Harbor Beach High School as valedictorian. McCollough later graduated from Western State Teachers College.

== Career ==
McCollough served on the Dearborn City Council from 1950 to 1953. On November 2, 1954, McCollough was elected to the Michigan House of Representatives where she represented the Wayne County 16th district from January 12, 1955, to 1964. On November 4, 1964, McCollough was elected to the Michigan House of Representatives where she represented the 31st district from January 13, 1965, to 1982. During her time in the legislature, she had she had 100 percent voting attendance, which has been recorded in the Guinness Book of World Records. McCollough wrote the legislation that requires school districts in Michigan to have special education.

== Personal life ==
Lucille married Clarence McCollough on June 16, 1925. Together they had three children, including future Michigan state senator Patrick H. McCollough. McCollough was Presbyterian.

== Death and legacy ==
On March 14, 1996, McCollough died in Oakwood Hospital in Dearborn due to complications from a stroke. McCollough is interred at White Rock Cemetery in Huron County, Michigan. In 2002, McCollough was inducted into the Michigan Women's Hall of Fame.
