= Gail Haines =

American politician (born 1951)

Member of the Michigan House of Representatives from the 43rd district
- In office January 1, 2009 – December 31, 2014
- Preceded by: Fran Amos
- Succeeded by: Jim Tedder

Personal details
- Born: December 19, 1951 (age 74) New York City
- Party: Republican
- Spouse: David
- Education: Nazareth College, State University of New York
- Website: State Rep. Gail Haines

Gail Haines (born 19 December 1951) is a former American politician from Michigan. Haines was a Republican member of Michigan House of Representatives.

== Education ==
Haines received a Bachelor of Science degree in Education from State University of New York in 1973 and a Master of Science degree in Education from Nazareth College in 1975.

== Career ==
Haines was a public school teacher and an educator.

On November 4, 2010, Haines won an election to the state house and became a Republican member of Michigan House of Representatives for District 43. Haines defeated Scott Hudson and Paul J. Greenawalt with 49.25% of the vote. On November 6, 2012, as an incumbent, Haines won the election and continued serving District 43. Haines defeated Neil Billington with 60.76% of the votes.

A former member of the Lake Angelus city council, Haines is a member of a number of community boards and organizations.

== Personal life ==
Haines' husband is David. They have one child. Haines and her family live in Waterford Township, Michigan.

== See also ==
- 2008 Michigan House of Representatives election
- 2010 Michigan House of Representatives election
