= Michigan Legislature =

Legislative branch of the state government of Michigan

Coordinates: 42.733601°N 84.555470°W

Type
- Type: Bicameral
- Houses: Senate; House of Representatives
- Term limits: 12 years combined

History
- Founded: January 26, 1837
- Preceded by: Michigan Territorial Council

Leadership
- President of the Senate (Lt. Governor): Garlin Gilchrist (D) since January 1, 2019
- President pro tempore of the Senate: Jeremy Moss (D) since January 11, 2023
- Speaker of the House: Matt Hall (R) since January 8, 2025

Structure
- Seats: 148; 38 Senators; 110 Representatives
- Senate political groups: Democratic (20); Republican (18)
- House political groups: Republican (58); Democratic (52)
- Length of term: Senate: 4 years House: 2 years
- Authority: Article IV, Michigan Constitution
- Salary: $71,685 salary/year + $10,800 per diem/year

Elections
- Last Senate election: November 8, 2022
- Last House election: November 5, 2024
- Next Senate election: November 3, 2026
- Next House election: November 3, 2026
- Redistricting: Independent redistricting commission (as of December 14, 2018)

Meeting place
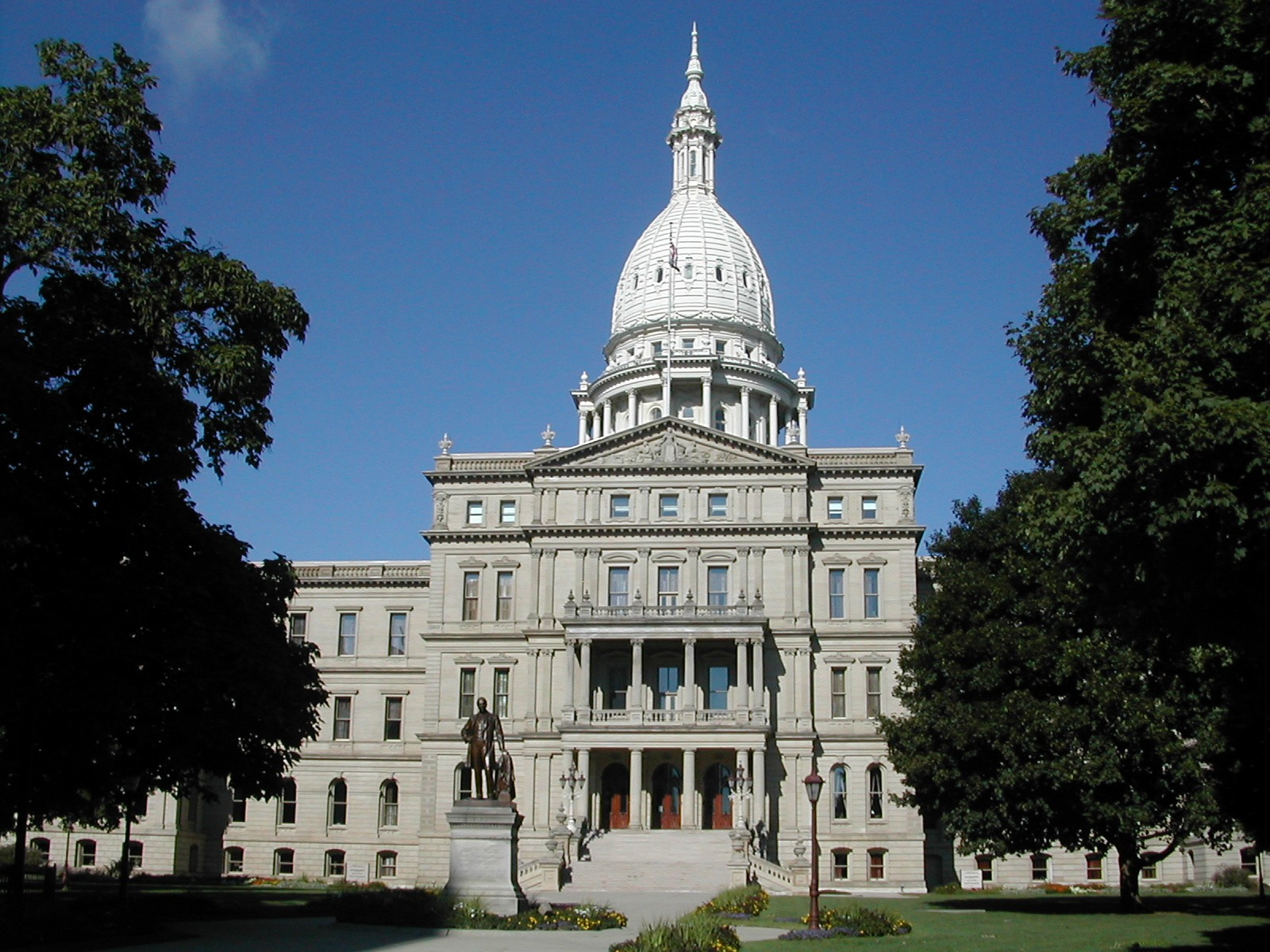
- Michigan State Capitol; Lansing

Website
- legislature.mi.gov

Constitution
- Constitution of Michigan

The Michigan Legislature is the legislature of the U.S. state of Michigan. It is organized as a bicameral body composed of the Senate (the upper chamber) and the House of Representatives (the lower chamber). Article IV of the Michigan Constitution, adopted in 1963, defines the role of the Legislature and how it is to be constituted. The chief purposes of the Legislature are to enact new laws and amend or repeal existing laws. The Legislature meets in the Capitol building in Lansing.

The 103rd Michigan Legislature was sworn in on January 11, 2025.

== Titles ==
Members of the Senate are referred to as Senators and members of the House of Representatives are referred to as Representatives.

== Michigan Senate ==
The Senate is the upper house of the Legislature. Its members are elected on a partisan basis for four-year terms, concurrent with the election of the Governor of Michigan. The Senate consists of 38 members elected from single-member election districts ranging from 212,400 to 263,500 residents according to the most recent creation of districts (2002). Legislative districts are drawn on the basis of population figures through the federal decennial census. Senators' terms begin at noon on January 1 following their election. The Senate Chamber is located in the south wing of the State Capitol building. As of 2025, Democrats hold the majority in the Senate with 19 seats; Republicans hold the minority with 18 seats and 1 seat is vacant. Under the Michigan Constitution, the Lieutenant Governor of Michigan serves as President of the Senate, but may only cast a vote in the instance of a tie. The Senate selects its other officers and adopts its own rules of procedure at the start of a new Legislative Session.

== Michigan House of Representatives ==
The House of Representatives is the lower house of the Legislature. Its members are elected on a partisan basis for two-year terms, at the same time at which Representatives in U.S. Congress are chosen. The House of Representatives consists of 110 members who are elected from single-member election districts ranging from 77,000 to 91,000 according to the most recent creation of districts (2012). Legislative districts are drawn on the basis of population figures through the federal decennial census. Representatives' terms begin at noon on January 1 following their election. The House of Representatives Chamber in the State Capitol is located in the north wing of the State Capitol building. as of January 2025, the Republican Party have a 58-52 vote power majority within the Michigan House of Representatives. The House of Representatives selects its own Speaker of the House and other officers and adopts its rules of procedure at the start of a new legislative session.

== Term limits ==
In 1992, the Michigan public voted to enact term limits for the Michigan legislature. In 1995, the U.S. Supreme Court ruled that states could not enact congressional term limits, but ruled that the state-level term limits remain. On November 8, 2022, voters approved Proposal 1, limiting state representatives and senators to 12 years combined in either chamber of the legislature, but senators re-elected in 2022 would remain eligible for their new terms even if it pushed them over the 12-year limit.

== Campaign finance reform ==
In 2026, the Michigan public voted to amend the "Michigan Campaign Finance Act" through Proposal 2026-2. This proposal prohibits certain electric and gas utilities (mainly DTE and Consumer's Energy) with more than $250,000 in annual government contracts from contributing to campaigns of government officials tasked with regulating them. It was started as a citizen-led ballot, and sponsored by the Michiganders for Money out of Politics (MMOP) coalition, to remove the conflict of interest between political action committees (PACs) for these companies and the citizens officials represented. In addition to limiting campaign contributions, the proposal also updated campaign finance requirements. Expanding what counts as campaign spending and advertising to include "attack ads" or other forms of indirect promotion of a candidate not explicitly mentioned in the advertising material.

== Legislative session ==
For reckoning periods of time during which the Legislature operates, each two-year period coinciding with the election of new members of the House of Representatives is numbered consecutively as a legislature, dating to the first legislature following adoption of Michigan's first constitution. The current two-year term of the legislature (beginning January 8, 2025) is the 103rd Legislature.

Each year during which the Legislature meets constitutes a new legislative session. According to Article IV Section 13 of the Michigan Constitution, a new session of the Legislature begins when the members of each house convene, on the second Wednesday of January every year at noon. A regular session of the Legislature typically lasts throughout the entire year with several periods of recess and adjourns sine die in late December.

The Michigan Legislature is one of ten full-time state legislative bodies in the United States. Members receive a base salary of $71,685 per year, which makes them the fourth-highest paid legislators in the country, after California, Pennsylvania and New York. While legislators in many states receive per diems that make up for lower salaries, Michigan legislators receive $10,800 per year for session and interim expenses. Salaries and expense allowances are determined by the State Officers Compensation Commission.

Any legislation pending in either chamber at the end of a session that is not the end of a legislative term of office continues and carries over to the next Legislative Session.

== Powers and process ==
All bills published by the Michigan Legislature must have been distributed to the chambers at least five days before voting and must be subject to three readings.

=== Leadership ===
The House of Representatives is headed by the Speaker, while the Senate is headed by the Lieutenant Governor of Michigan, who serves as President of the Senate but may only cast a vote in the instance of a tie.

- President of the Michigan Senate (Lieutenant Governor): Garlin Gilchrist (D)
- President Pro Tempore of the Michigan Senate: Jeremy Moss (D)
- Majority Leader of the Michigan Senate: Winnie Brinks (D)
- Minority Leader of the Michigan Senate: Aric Nesbitt (R)
- Speaker of the House: Matt Hall (R)
- Speaker Pro Tempore of the Michigan House: Rachelle Smit (R)
- Majority Leader of the Michigan House: Bryan Posthumus (R)
- Minority Leader of the Michigan House: Ranjeev Puri (D)

== See also ==
- Government of Michigan
- List of Michigan state legislatures
