= Michigan's 31st House of Representatives district =

American legislative district

Michigan's 31st State House of Representatives district
Representative
Reggie Miller; D–Belleville
- Demographics: 75.4% White; 13.5% Black; 4.3% Hispanic; 1.5% Asian; 0.1% Native American; 0.5% Other; 4.7% Multiracial
- Population (2024): 92,999

Michigan's 31st House of Representatives district is a legislative district within the Michigan House of Representatives located in the counties of Lenawee, Monroe, Washtenaw, and Wayne. The district was created in 1965, when the Michigan Supreme Court ordered the reapportionment of state legislative districts from a county-based system to a proportional one following the Supreme Court case Reynolds v. Sims. It is currently represented by Democratic Reggie Miller of Belleville.

== List of representatives ==
Representative	Party	Years	Residence	Notes
Lucille H. McCollough	Democratic	1965–1982	Dearborn	Reapportioned from the former Wayne County, 16th district.
William J. Runco	Republican	1983–1986	Dearborn	
Agnes M. Dobronski	Democratic	1987–1988	Dearborn	
William J. Runco	Republican	1989–1990	Dearborn	
Agnes M. Dobronski	Democratic	1991–1992	Dearborn	Redistricted to the 15th district.
Sharon L. Gire	Democratic	1993–1998	Clinton Township	Redistricted from the 72nd district; term limited.
Paul Gieleghem	Democratic	1999–2004	Clinton Township	Term limited.
Fred Miller	Democratic	2005–2010	Mount Clemens	Term limited.
Marilyn Lane	Democratic	2011–2016	Fraser	Term limited.
William Sowerby	Democratic	2017–2022	Clinton Township	Term limited.
Reggie Miller	Democratic	2023–present	Van Buren Township (until around 2024); Belleville	
Shannon Dare Wayne	Democratic	(Note: Member-elect.)	Milan	

== Historical district boundaries ==
Map	Description	Apportionment Plan	Notes
	Wayne County (part): Dearborn (part)	1964 Apportionment Plan (Note: Referred to as the Austin-Kleiner plan.)	
	Wayne County (part): Dearborn (part)	1972 Apportionment Plan (Note: Referred to as the Hatcher-Kleiner plan.)	
	Wayne County (part): Dearborn	1982 Apportionment Plan	
	Macomb County (part): Clinton Township (part); Fraser; Mount Clemens	1992 Apportionment Plan	
	Macomb County (part): Clinton Township (part); Fraser (part); Mount Clemens	2001 Apportionment Plan	
	Macomb County (part): Clinton Township (part); Fraser; Mount Clemens	2011 Apportionment Plan	
	Lenawee County (part): Macon Township; Monroe County (part): Dundee Township; Exeter Township; London Township; Milan (part); Milan Township; Raisinville Township; Washtenaw County (part): Augusta Township; Milan (part); York Township (part); Wayne County (part): Belleville; Romulus (part); Sumpter Township; Van Buren Township	2021 Apportionment Plan (Note: Referred to as the Hickory plan.)	

== Recent elections ==
=== 2020s ===
2026 Michigan House of Representatives election
Party	Candidate	Votes	%
Democratic	Shannon Dare Wayne	24,604	53.48
Republican	Laura M. Perry	21,402	46.52
Total votes		46,006	100
Democratic hold			

2024 Michigan House of Representatives election
Party	Candidate	Votes	%
Democratic	Reggie Miller (incumbent)	27,347	50.64
Republican	Dale Biniecki	26,651	49.36
Total votes		53,998	100
Democratic hold			

2022 Michigan House of Representatives election
Party	Candidate	Votes	%
Democratic	Reggie Miller	21,810	52.26
Republican	Dale Biniecki	19,925	47.74
Total votes		41,735	100
Democratic hold			

2020 Michigan House of Representatives election
Party	Candidate	Votes	%
Democratic	William J. Sowerby (incumbent)	26,202	56.27
Republican	Lisa Valerio-Nowc	20,364	43.73
Total votes		46,566	100
Democratic hold			

=== 2010s ===
2018 Michigan House of Representatives election
Party	Candidate	Votes	%
Democratic	William J. Sowerby (incumbent)	20,791	59.89
Republican	Lisa Valerio-Nowc	13,925	40.11
Total votes		34,716	100
Democratic hold			

2016 Michigan House of Representatives election
Party	Candidate	Votes	%
Democratic	William J. Sowerby	22,735	56.16
Republican	Lisa Valerio-Nowc	15,743	38.89
Libertarian	Mike Saliba	2,007	4.96
Total votes		40,485	100
Democratic hold			

2014 Michigan House of Representatives election
Party	Candidate	Votes	%
Democratic	Marilyn Lane (incumbent)	15,769	61.07
Republican	Phil Rode	10,054	38.93
Total votes		25,823	100
Democratic hold			

2012 Michigan House of Representatives election
Party	Candidate	Votes	%
Democratic	Marilyn Lane (incumbent)	24,443	61.74
Republican	Lynn Evans	13,404	33.86
Libertarian	James Miller	1,742	4.4
Total votes		39,589	100
Democratic hold			

2010 Michigan House of Representatives election
Party	Candidate	Votes	%
Democratic	Marilyn Lane	12,710	50.92
Republican	Dan Tollis	10,874	43.57
Libertarian	James Miller	792	3.17
Independent	Dan Elles	584	2.34
Total votes		24,960	100
Democratic hold			

=== 2000s ===
2008 Michigan House of Representatives election
Party	Candidate	Votes	%
Democratic	Fred Miller (incumbent)	26,404	66.1
Republican	Dan Tollis	12,277	30.74
Libertarian	James Miller	1,263	3.16
Total votes		39,944	100
Democratic hold			

2006 Michigan House of Representatives election
Party	Candidate	Votes	%
Democratic	Fred Miller (incumbent)	18,584	62.55
Republican	Dan Tollis	10,348	34.83
Libertarian	James Miller	777	2.62
Total votes		29,709	100
Democratic hold			

2004 Michigan House of Representatives election
Party	Candidate	Votes	%
Democratic	Fred Miller	21,274	54.91
Republican	William A. Morelli	16,523	42.64
Libertarian	James Miller	949	2.45
Total votes		38,746	100
Democratic hold			

2002 Michigan House of Representatives election
Party	Candidate	Votes	%
Democratic	Paul Gieleghem (incumbent)	14,663	60.13
Republican	Sheryl Russo	9,021	36.99
Libertarian	James Miller	701	2.87
Total votes		24,385	100
Democratic hold			

2000 Michigan House of Representatives election
Party	Candidate	Votes	%
Democratic	Paul Gieleghem (incumbent)	22,039	61.21
Republican	Diane Zontini	12,468	34.63
Libertarian	James Miller	1,498	4.16
Natural Law Write-in	Gordon Reh	2	0.01
Total votes		36,007	100
Democratic hold			

=== 1990s ===
1998 Michigan House of Representatives election
Party	Candidate	Votes	%
Democratic	Paul Gieleghem	14,615	52.81
Republican	Quinnie E. Cody	12,147	43.89
Libertarian	John W. Fagan	914	3.3
Total votes		27,676	100
Democratic hold			
