= Michigan's 43rd House of Representatives district =

American legislative district

Michigan's 43rd State House of Representatives district
Representative
Rachelle Smit; R–Martin Township
- Demographics: 88.3% White; 0.7% Black; 5.8% Hispanic; 0.9% Asian; 0.1% Native American; 0.4% Other; 3.8% Multiracial
- Population (2024): 93,503

Michigan's 43rd House of Representatives district is a legislative district within the Michigan House of Representatives located in the counties of Allegan, Barry, Eaton, and Ottawa. The district was created in 1965, when the Michigan Supreme Court ordered the reapportionment of state legislative districts from a county-based system to a proportional one following the Supreme Court case Reynolds v. Sims. It is currently represented by Republican Rachelle Smit of Martin Township.

== List of representatives ==
Representative	Party	Years	Residence	Notes
Don R. Pears	Republican	1965–1970	Buchanan	Previously served in the former Berrien County, 1st district.
Harry T. Gast Jr.	Republican	1971–1978	St. Joseph	
Carl F. Gnodtke	Republican	1979–1992	Sawyer	Redistricted to the 78th district.
Charlie James Harrison Jr.	Democratic	1993–1994	Pontiac	Redistricted from the 62nd district; resigned January 1994 after being elected mayor of Pontiac.
Hubert Price Jr.	Democratic	1994 (Note: Elected in a 1994 special election to replace Rep. Charlie James Harrison Jr., who resigned.)–2000	Pontiac	Term limited.
Clarence E. Phillips	Democratic	2001–2002	Pontiac	Redistricted to the 29th district.
Fran Amos	Republican	2003–2008	Waterford Township	Term limited.
Gail Haines	Republican	2009–2014	Waterford Township	Term limited.
Jim Tedder	Republican	2015–2018	Clarkston	
Andrea Schroeder	Republican	2019–2021	Clarkston	Died October 2021.
Mike Harris	Republican	2022 (Note: Elected in a 2022 special election to replace Rep. Andrea Schroeder, who died.)	Waterford Township	Redistricted to the 52nd district.
Rachelle Smit	Republican	2023–present	Shelbyville (until around 2026); Martin Township	

== Historical district boundaries ==
Map	Description	Apportionment Plan	Notes
	Berrien County (part): Baroda Township; Berrien Township (part); Bertrand Township; Bridgman; Buchanan; Buchanan Township; Chikaming Township; Galien Township; Lake Township; Lincoln Township; New Buffalo Township; Oronoko Township; St. Joseph; St. Joseph Township; Three Oaks Township; Weesaw Township; Cass County (part): LaGrange Township; Penn Township; Pokagon Township; Wayne Township	1964 Apportionment Plan	
	Berrien County (part): Baroda Township; Bertrand Township; Bridgman; Buchanan; Buchanan Township; Chikaming Township; Galien Township; Lake Township; Lincoln Township; New Buffalo; New Buffalo Township; Niles Township (part); Oronoko Township; Royalton Township; Three Oaks Township; Sodus Township; St. Joseph; St. Joseph Township; Weesaw Township	1972 Apportionment Plan	
	Berrien County (part): Baroda Township; Bertrand Township; Bridgman; Buchanan; Buchanan Township; Galien Township; Lake Township; Lincoln Township; New Buffalo; New Buffalo Township; Niles; Niles Township; Oronoko Township; Three Oaks Township; Weesaw Township; Chikaming Township	1982 Apportionment Plan	
	Oakland County (part): Auburn Hills; Lake Angelus; Pontiac	1992 Apportionment Plan	
	Oakland County (part): Lake Angelus; Waterford Township; West Bloomfield Township (part)	2001 Apportionment Plan	
	Oakland County (part): Independence Township; Lake Angelus; Village of Clarkston; Waterford Township (part)	2011 Apportionment Plan	
	Allegan County (part): Allegan; Allegan Township; Clyde Township; Dorr Township; Fennville; Fillmore Township; Heath Township; Hopkins Township; Manlius Township; Martin Township; Monterey Township; Overisel Township; Salem Township; Valley Township; Watson Township; Wayland; Wayland Township; Barry County (part): Assyria Township; Barry Township; Hope Township; Johnstown Township; Orangeville Township; Prairieville Township; Yankee Springs Township; Eaton County (part): Bellevue Township; Ottawa County (part): Jamestown Charter Township (part)	2021 Apportionment Plan (Note: Referred to as the Hickory plan.)	

== Recent elections ==
=== 2020s ===
2026 Michigan House of Representatives election
Party	Candidate	Votes	%
Republican	Rachelle Smit (incumbent)	31,255	68.74
Democratic	Alan Swank	14,216	31.26
Total votes		45,471	100
Republican hold			

2024 Michigan House of Representatives election
Party	Candidate	Votes	%
Republican	Rachelle Smit (incumbent)	39,396	72.07
Democratic	Danene Shumaker	15,265	27.93
Total votes		54,661	100
Republican hold			

2022 Michigan House of Representatives election
Party	Candidate	Votes	%
Republican	Rachelle Smit	30,920	70.77
Democratic	Mark Ludwig	12,771	29.23
Total votes		43,691	100
Republican hold			

2020 Michigan House of Representatives election
Party	Candidate	Votes	%
Republican	Andrea K. Schroeder (incumbent)	33,405	59.65
Democratic	Nicole Breadon	22,596	40.35
Total votes		56,001	100
Republican hold			

=== 2010s ===
2018 Michigan House of Representatives election
Party	Candidate	Votes	%
Republican	Andrea K. Schroeder	24,061	56.5
Democratic	Nicole Breadon	18,509	43.5
Total votes		42,570	100
Republican hold			

2016 Michigan House of Representatives election
Party	Candidate	Votes	%
Republican	Jim Tedder	30,923	65.5
Democratic	Ted Villella	16,309	34.5
Total votes		47,232	100
Republican hold			

2014 Michigan House of Representatives election
Party	Candidate	Votes	%
Republican	Jim Tedder	18,661	58.2
Democratic	Dennis Ritter	13,380	41.8
Total votes		32,041	100
Republican hold			

2012 Michigan House of Representatives election
Party	Candidate	Votes	%
Republican	Gail Haines	26,554	60.8
Democratic	Neil Billington	17,149	39.2
Total votes		43,703	100
Republican hold			

2010 Michigan House of Representatives election
Party	Candidate	Votes	%
Republican	Gail Haines	17,295	65.6
Democratic	Regina Strong	9,064	34.4
Total votes		26,359	100
Republican hold			

2008 Michigan House of Representatives election
Party	Candidate	Votes	%
Republican	Gail Haines	20,216	49.3
Democratic	Scott Hudson	19,367	47.2
Constitution	Paul Greenawalt	1,460	3.6
Total votes		41,043	100
Republican hold			
