= Laurie Pohutsky =

American microbiologist and politician

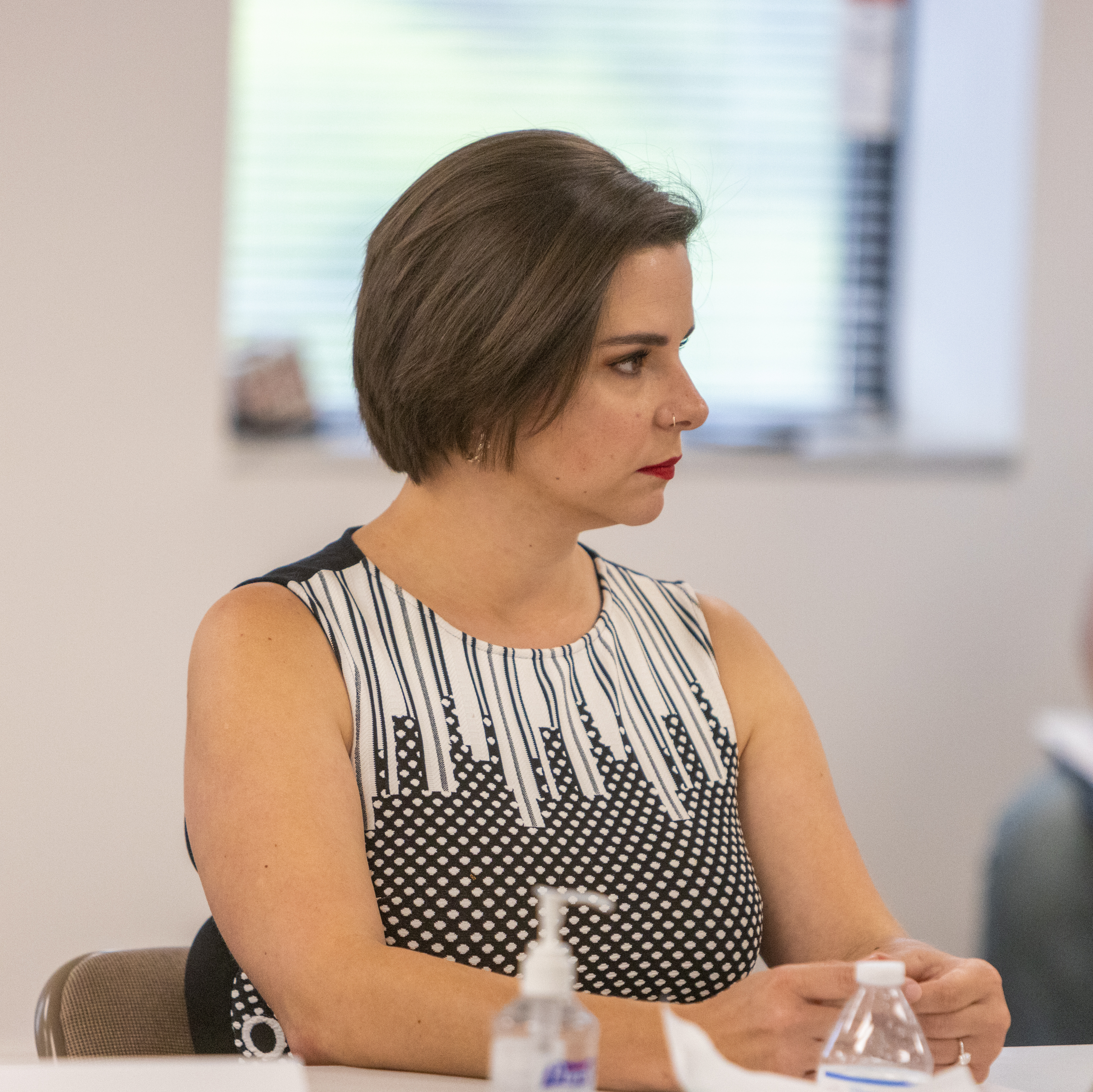
- Pohutsky in 2023

Speaker pro tempore of the Michigan House of Representatives
- In office January 11, 2023 – January 8, 2025
- Preceded by: Pamela Hornberger
- Succeeded by: Rachelle Smit

Member of the Michigan House of Representatives
- Incumbent
- Assumed office January 1, 2019
- Preceded by: Laura Cox
- Constituency: 19th district (2019–2022); 17th district (2023–present)

Personal details
- Born: Laurie Tennant; April 28, 1988 (age 38)
- Party: Democratic
- Education: Michigan State University (BS)
- Website: Campaign website

Laurie Pohutsky (née Tennant; born April 28, 1988) is an American politician serving as a member of the Michigan House of Representatives since 2019, currently representing the 17th district. She is a member of the Democratic Party.

== Early life and education ==
Pohutsky was born Laurie Tennant in Livonia, Michigan. She grew up in Redford, Michigan. Between 2006 and 2010 she attended Michigan State University, graduating with a Bachelor of Science in Microbiology. Pohutsky then worked as a laboratory technician for several companies in fields involving food safety, toxicology and health care.

== Political career ==
In 2018, Pohutsky successfully ran as a Democrat for the Michigan House of Representatives for District 19, narrowly defeating Republican candidate Brian Meakin. In the 2020 election Pohutsky was reelected, once again by a narrow margin.

During the 2020 Democratic presidential primaries, she endorsed Massachusetts Senator Elizabeth Warren for President of the United States.

During the 2022 Michigan House of Representatives election, Pohutsky ran to represent District 17, defeating opponent Penny Crider in a landslide. She was subsequently appointed speaker pro tempore of the Michigan House.

Pohutsky was reelected to the 17th district in 2024.

== Personal life ==
Pohutsky is openly bisexual. In February 2025, she revealed she had undergone sterilization in the prior month, saying "I refuse to let my body be treated as currency by an administration that only sees value in my ability to procreate". Pohutsky was a sponsor of the legislation passed in April 2023 that repealed the 1931 criminalization of abortion in Michigan.

Political offices
Preceded by Pamela Hornberger	Speaker pro tempore of the Michigan House of Representatives; 2023–2025	Succeeded by Rachelle Smit
