= Tonya Myers Phillips =

American politician

Member of the Michigan House of Representatives from the 7th district
- Incumbent
- Assumed office January 1, 2025
- Preceded by: Helena Scott

Personal details
- Born: 1976 or 1977 (age 49–50)
- Party: Democratic
- Education: University of Michigan, Ann Arbor (BA, JD)

Tonya Myers Phillips (born 1976 or 1977 (age 49–50)) is an American politician and attorney serving as a member of the Michigan House of Representatives since 2025, representing the 7th district. She is a member of the Democratic Party.

== Political career ==
Phillips served on the Detroit Charter Revision Commission from 2010 to 2012.

Phillips ran in the 2024 Michigan House of Representatives election for the 7th district. She faced Democrats Ernest Little and Abraham Shaw in the primary election, which she won with 68% of the vote. She won the general election with 79% of the vote.

== Electoral history ==
2024 Michigan's 7th House of Representatives district election
Party	Candidate	Votes	%
Democratic	Tonya Myers Phillips	22,713	78.91%
Republican	Barry L. Altman	4,331	15.05%
Working Class	Linda Rayburn	1,740	6.05%
Total votes		28,784	100.0
