= Reggie Miller (politician) =

American politician

Member of the Michigan House of Representatives from the 31st district
- Incumbent
- Assumed office January 1, 2023
- Preceded by: William Sowerby
- Succeeded by: Shannon Wayne (elect)

Personal details
- Party: Democratic
- Education: Purdue University North Central (AA); Cleary University (BA)

Reggie Miller is an American politician serving as a member of the Michigan House of Representatives since 2023, representing the 31st district. A member of the Democratic Party, Miller previously served as a member of the Van Buren Township Board of Trustees, and was reelected to the House in 2024.
