= Mike Harris (Michigan politician) =

American politician

Member of the Michigan House of Representatives
- Incumbent
- Assumed office May 9, 2022
- Preceded by: Andrea Schroeder
- Constituency: 43rd district (2022–2023); 52nd district (2023–present)

Personal details
- Born: March 16, 1973 (age 53) California, U.S.
- Party: Republican
- Education: Mott Community College (AA)

Mike Harris (born March 16, 1973) is an American law enforcement officer, businessman, and politician serving as a member of the Michigan House of Representatives since 2022, currently representing the 52nd district. He is a member of the Republican Party.

== Early life and career ==
After living in California as a child, Harris moved to Michigan, where he eventually attended Mott Community College. He has worked as a police officer. Harris owns and operates Paladin Training and Consulting, a firearms-training company.

== Political career ==
Harris was elected in a special election to the 43rd district of the Michigan House of Representatives in May 2022. This district covered Lake Angelus, Clarkston, Independence Township, and part of Waterford Township.

Following redistricting, Harris ran in the 52nd district in the 2022 Michigan House of Representatives election. He won reelection with 59% of the vote.

In 2024, Harris was reelected against Democratic candidate Caroline Dargay. His campaign raised over $85,000 and spent just over $81,000, while Dargay neither raised nor spent any money. Harris won nearly 62% of the vote.

== Political positions ==
After Donald Trump was inaugurated for his second term as US President, Harris issued a statement: “I look forward to partnering with the Trump administration to champion the values and priorities of hard-working Michiganders.”

In 2023, Harris voted against a House resolution that recognized libraries as “cultural institutions at the heart of every Michigan community and campus” and librarians as the “heartbeat of every library.”

Harris is a supporter of same-sex marriage. However, on March 8, 2023, Harris voted against House Bill 4003, which would end discrimination based on gender identity and sexual orientation in the state of Michigan; the bill passed despite his vote against it.

In a press release in 2025, Harris conflated “illegal aliens” and “dangerous criminals” despite the fact that immigrants in the US are less likely than citizens to commit crimes.

In 2025, Harris supported a bill that would have banned trans students in public universities from using the bathroom that coincides with their gender identity.

In June, 2025, Harris demanded that Michigan’s governor “restore integrity and purpose to the Michigan State Police”.
