= Rachelle Smit =

American politician from Michigan

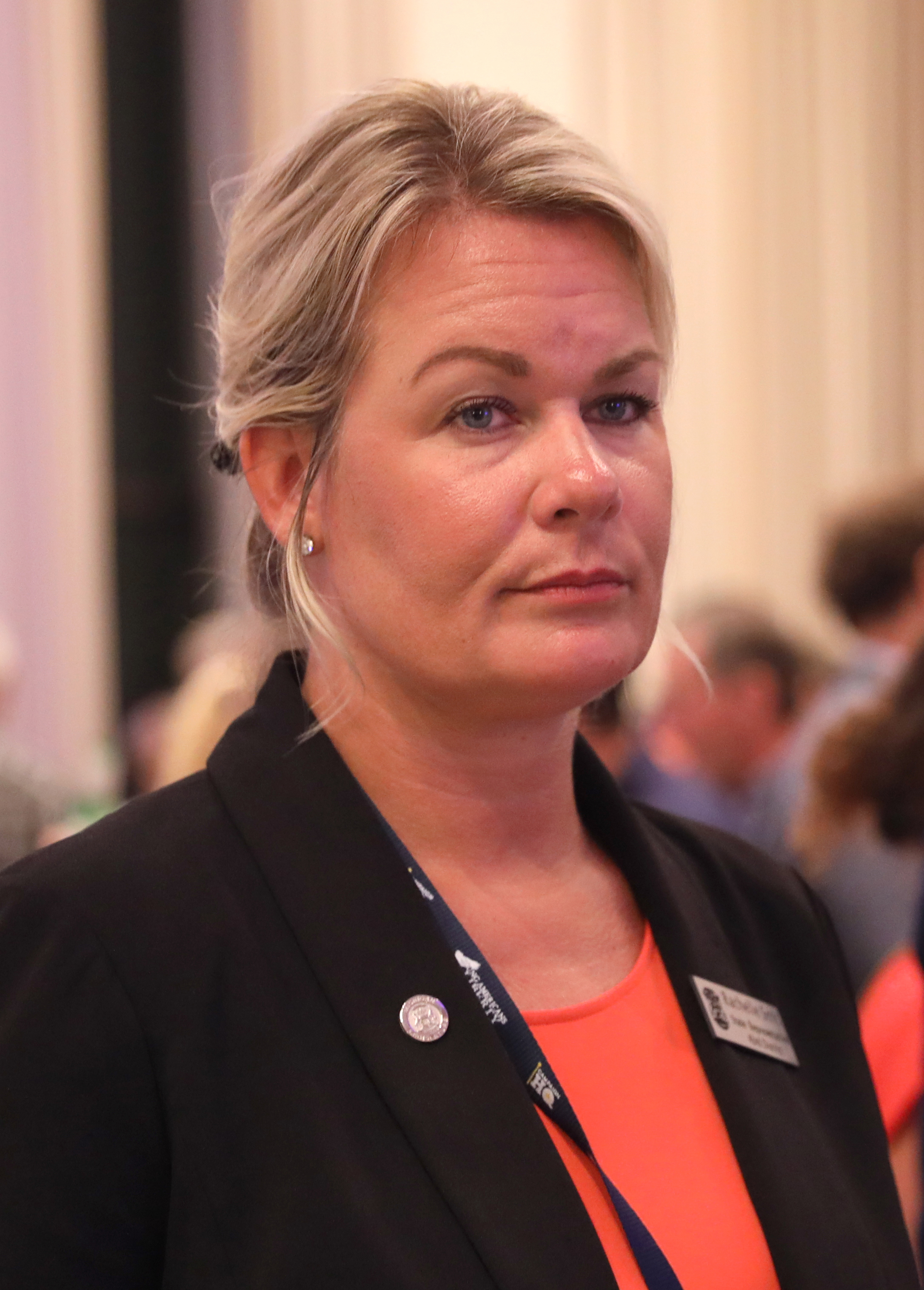

Speaker pro tempore of the Michigan House of Representatives
- Incumbent
- Assumed office January 8, 2025
- Preceded by: Laurie Pohutsky

Member of the Michigan House of Representatives from the 43rd district
- Incumbent
- Assumed office January 1, 2023
- Preceded by: Mike Harris (redistricting)

Personal details
- Born: September 16, 1980 (age 45) Grand Rapids, Michigan, U.S.
- Party: Republican

Rachelle Smit is an American politician serving as a member of the Michigan House of Representatives since 2023, representing the 43rd district. A member of the Republican Party, Smit has served as speaker pro tempore of the House since January 2025.

== Tenure ==
On October 27, 2023, Smit gave a legislative tribute in Allegan County, Michigan, to twin brothers William and Michael Null, who had been acquitted the previous month in connection with the Gretchen Whitmer kidnapping plot. Gretchen Whitmer's press secretary criticized Smit's statements, saying that the tribute "will further encourage and embolden radical extremists trying to sow discord and harm public officials or law enforcement".

== See also ==
- Official website
- Campaign website

Political offices
| Preceded by Laurie Pohutsky | Speaker pro tempore of the Michigan House of Representatives; 2025–present | Incumbent |
