= Michigan House of Representatives =

Lower house of the Michigan Legislature

Coordinates: 42.7338°N 84.5555°W

- Michigan Legislature

Type
- Type: Lower house
- Term limits: 6 terms (12 years)

History
- New session started: January 8, 2025

Leadership
- Speaker: Matt Hall (R) since January 8, 2025
- Speaker pro tempore: Rachelle Smit (R) since January 8, 2025
- Majority Leader: Bryan Posthumus (R) since January 8, 2025
- Minority Leader: Ranjeev Puri (D) since January 8, 2025

Structure
- Seats: 110
- Political groups: Majority: Republican (58); Minority: Democratic (51); Other: Non-caucusing Democrat (1) (Note: Democrat Karen Whitsett (District 4) left the Democratic caucus on January 9, 2025.)
- Length of term: 2 years
- Authority: Article IV, Section 3, Michigan Constitution
- Salary: $71,865/year + expenses

Elections
- Last election: November 5, 2024 (110 seats)
- Next election: November 3, 2026 (110 seats)
- Redistricting: Independent Redistricting Commission

Meeting place
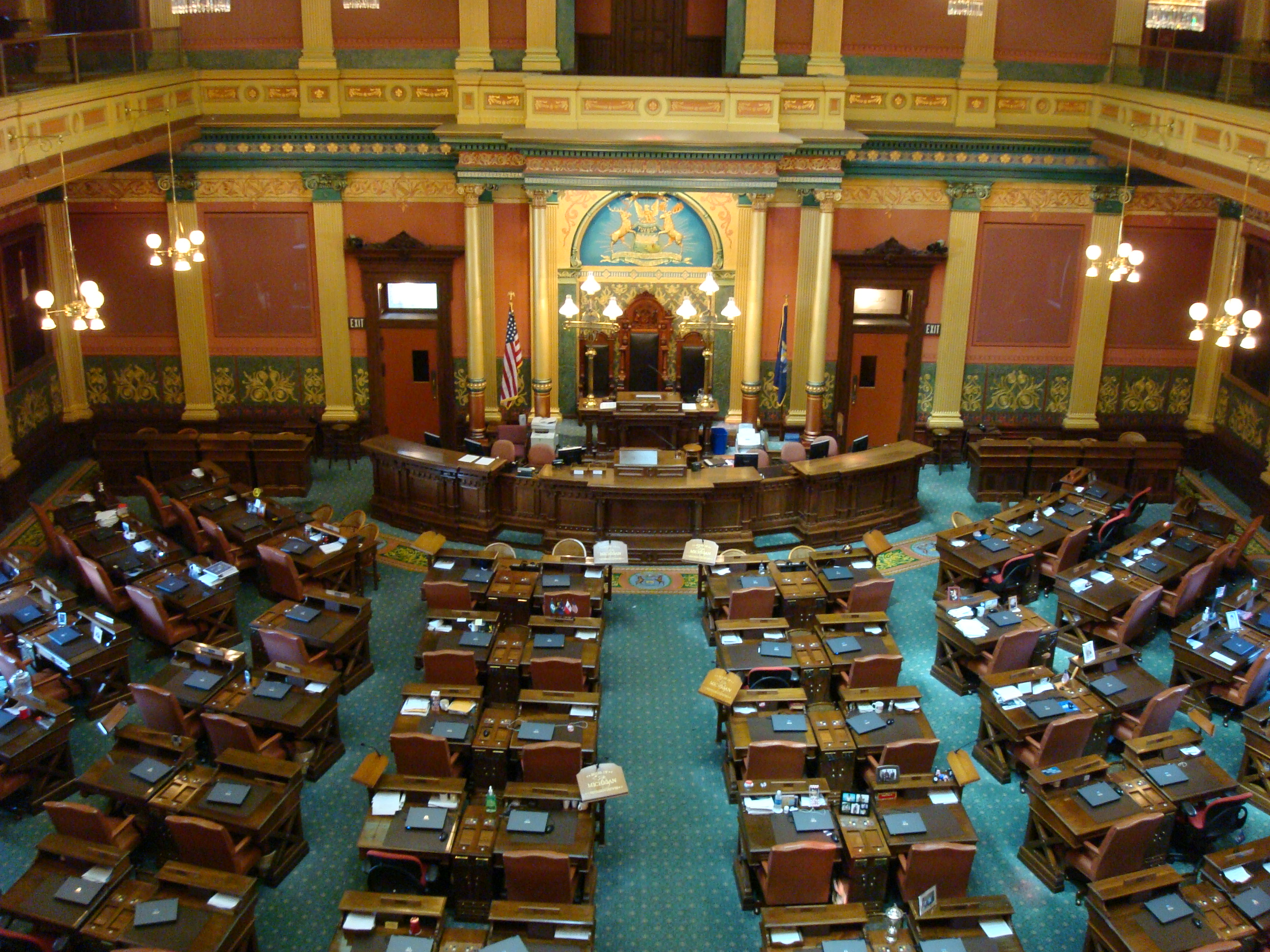
- House of Representatives Chamber; Michigan State Capitol; Lansing, Michigan

Website
- house.mi.gov

Rules
- Standing Rules of the House of Representatives

The Michigan House of Representatives is the lower house of the Michigan Legislature. There are 110 members, each of whom is elected from constituencies having approximately 77,000 to 91,000 residents, based on population figures from the 2020 U.S. census. Its composition, powers and duties are established in Article IV of the Michigan Constitution.

Members are elected in even-numbered years and take office at noon (EST) on January 1 following the November general election. Concurrently with the Michigan Senate, the House first convenes on the second Wednesday in January, according to the state constitution. Each member is limited to serving at most six terms of two years, but may not serve more than twelve years combined across the Michigan House and Michigan Senate. The House meets in the north wing of the Michigan Capitol in Lansing. The Republican Party currently has a majority in the chamber.

After the 2010 census, the Republican-controlled Michigan Legislature drew new district maps for the state House. Republicans retained a majority of seats in subsequent elections under those maps through 2020, including in some cycles in which Democratic candidates received a larger share of the statewide popular vote. In 2018, voters approved Proposal 2, a ballot initiative that transferred redistricting authority from the legislature to an independent citizens commission. The commission adopted new maps after the 2020 census. Under the new maps, Democrats won a majority of House seats in 2022—the first Democratic majority since 2008. In 2024, Republicans regained a 58–52 majority by defeating four Democratic incumbents.

== Qualifications ==
According to the constitution of Michigan, to be eligible for the office of State Representative a person must be a citizen of the United States, at least 21 years of age, and a registered and qualified elector of the district he or she wishes to represent by the filing deadline.

== Title ==
Members of the Michigan House of Representatives are commonly referred to as representatives. Because this mirrors the terminology used to describe members of Congress, constituents and news media, abiding by the Associated Press guidelines for journalists, often refer to members as state representatives to avoid confusion with their federal counterparts. As elected officials, members of the Michigan House of Representatives also receive the courtesy title of the Honorable (abbreviated to Hon. or Hon'ble) for life.

== Composition ==
Affiliation	Party (Shading indicates majority caucus)				Total	
Affiliation	Republican		Democratic		Total	Vacant
End of the previous legislature	56	1	53		110	0
2023–2025	54		56		110	0
Begin 2025 Session	58		52		110	0
January 9, 2025	58		1	51	110	0
Latest voting share	52.7%		0.9%	46.4%		

== Leadership ==
=== Majority party ===
- Speaker of the House: Matt Hall of Richland Township (R-42)
- Speaker pro tempore: Rachelle Smit of Shelbyville (R-43)
- Majority Floor Leader: Bryan Posthumus of Cannon Township (R-90)

=== Minority party ===
- Minority Leader: Ranjeev Puri of Canton (D-24)
- Minority Floor Leader: John Fitzgerald of Wyoming (D-83)

== Members ==
Composition of the Michigan State House after the 2022 elections Democratic Party Republican Party

District	State Representative	Party	County(ies)	Term
1	Tyrone Carter	Dem	Wayne	4th
2	Tullio Liberati	Dem	Wayne	3rd
3	Alabas Farhat	Dem	Wayne	2nd
4	Karen Whitsett	Dem	Wayne	4th
5	Regina Weiss	Dem	Oakland, Wayne	3rd
6	Natalie Price	Dem	Oakland, Wayne	2nd
7	Tonya Myers Phillips	Dem	Oakland, Wayne	1st
8	Helena Scott	Dem	Oakland, Wayne	3rd
9	Joe Tate	Dem	Wayne	4th
10	Veronica Paiz	Dem	Macomb, Wayne	2nd
11	Donavan McKinney	Dem	Macomb, Wayne	2nd
12	Kimberly Edwards	Dem	Macomb, Wayne	3rd
13	Mai Xiong↑	Dem	Macomb, Wayne	2nd (1st full)
14	Mike McFall	Dem	Macomb, Wayne	2nd
15	Erin Byrnes	Dem	Wayne	2nd
16	Stephanie Young	Dem	Wayne	3rd
17	Laurie Pohutsky	Dem	Wayne	4th
18	Jason Hoskins	Dem	Oakland	2nd
19	Samantha Steckloff	Dem	Oakland	3rd
20	Noah Arbit	Dem	Oakland	2nd
21	Kelly Breen	Dem	Oakland	3rd
22	Matt Koleszar	Dem	Wayne	4th
23	Jason Morgan	Dem	Oakland, Washtenaw, Wayne	2nd
24	Ranjeev Puri	Dem	Wayne	3rd
25	Peter Herzberg↑	Dem	Wayne	2nd (1st full)
26	Dylan Wegela	Dem	Wayne	2nd
27	Rylee Linting	Rep	Wayne	1st
28	Jamie Thompson	Rep	Monroe, Wayne	2nd
29	James DeSana	Rep	Monroe, Wayne	2nd
30	William Bruck	Rep	Lenawee, Monroe	2nd
31	Reggie Miller	Dem	Lenawee, Monroe, Washtenaw, Wayne	2nd
32	Jimmie Wilson Jr.	Dem	Washtenaw	2nd
33	Morgan Foreman	Dem	Washtenaw	1st
34	Nancy Jenkins-Arno	Rep	Lenawee	4th
35	Jennifer Wortz	Rep	Branch, Hillsdale, Lenawee	1st
36	Steve Carra	Rep	Cass, St. Joseph	3rd
37	Brad Paquette	Rep	Berrien, Cass	4th
38	Joey Andrews	Dem	Allegan, Berrien, Van Buren	2nd
39	Pauline Wendzel	Rep	Allegan, Berrien, Van Buren	4th
40	Matthew Longjohn	Dem	Kalamazoo	1st
41	Julie Rogers	Dem	Kalamazoo	3rd
42	Matt Hall	Rep	Allegan, Kalamazoo	4th
43	Rachelle Smit	Rep	Allegan, Barry, Eaton, Ottawa	2nd
44	Steve Frisbie	Rep	Calhoun	1st
45	Sarah Lightner	Rep	Calhoun, Kalamazoo, Jackson	4th
46	Kathy Schmaltz	Rep	Jackson, Washtenaw	2nd
47	Carrie Rheingans	Dem	Jackson, Washtenaw	2nd
48	Jennifer Conlin	Dem	Jackson, Livingston, Washtenaw	2nd
49	Ann Bollin	Rep	Livingston, Oakland	4th
50	Jason Woolford	Rep	Livingston	1st
51	Matt Maddock	Rep	Oakland	4th
52	Mike Harris↑	Rep	Oakland	3rd (2nd full)
53	Brenda Carter	Dem	Oakland	4th
54	Donni Steele	Rep	Oakland	2nd
55	Mark Tisdel	Rep	Oakland	3rd
56	Sharon MacDonell	Dem	Oakland	2nd
57	Thomas Kuhn	Rep	Macomb, Oakland	2nd
58	Ron Robinson	Rep	Macomb	1st
59	Doug Wozniak	Rep	Macomb	4th
60	Joseph Aragona	Rep	Macomb	2nd
61	Denise Mentzer	Dem	Macomb	2nd
62	Alicia St. Germaine	Rep	Macomb	2nd
63	Jay DeBoyer	Rep	Macomb, St. Clair	2nd
64	Joseph Pavlov	Rep	Sanilac, St. Clair	1st
65	Jaime Greene	Rep	Lapeer, Macomb, St. Clair	2nd
66	Josh Schriver	Rep	Macomb, Oakland	2nd
67	Phil Green	Rep	Genesee, Lapeer, Tuscola	4th
68	David Martin	Rep	Genesee, Oakland	3rd
69	Jasper Martus	Dem	Genesee	2nd
70	Cynthia Neeley↑	Dem	Genesee	4th (3rd full)
71	Brian BeGole	Rep	Gensee, Saginaw, Shiawassee	2nd
72	Mike Mueller	Rep	Genesee, Livingston, Oakland	4th
73	Julie Brixie	Dem	Ingham	4th
74	Kara Hope	Dem	Ingham	4th
75	Penelope Tsernoglou	Dem	Clinton, Ingham, Shiawassee	2nd
76	Angela Witwer	Dem	Eaton	4th
77	Emily Dievendorf	Dem	Clinton, Eaton, Ingham	2nd
78	Gina Johnsen	Rep	Barry, Eaton, Ionia, Kent	2nd
79	Angela Rigas	Rep	Allegan, Barry, Kent	2nd
80	Phil Skaggs	Dem	Kent	2nd
81	Stephen Wooden	Dem	Kent	1st
82	Kristian Grant	Dem	Kent	2nd
83	John Fitzgerald	Dem	Kent	2nd
84	Carol Glanville↑	Dem	Kent	3rd (2nd full)
85	Bradley Slagh	Rep	Ottawa	4th
86	Nancy DeBoer	Rep	Allegan, Ottawa	2nd
87	Will Snyder	Dem	Muskegon	2nd
88	Greg VanWoerkom	Rep	Muskegon, Ottawa	4th
89	Luke Meerman	Rep	Kent, Muskegon, Ottawa	4th
90	Bryan Posthumus	Rep	Kent	3rd
91	Pat Outman	Rep	Ionia, Kent, Montcalm	3rd
92	Jerry Neyer	Rep	Gratiot, Isabella	2nd
93	Tim Kelly	Rep	Clinton, Gratiot, Ionia, Montcalm, Saginaw	4th
94	Amos O'Neal	Dem	Saginaw	3rd
95	Bill G. Schuette	Rep	Gladwin, Midland	2nd
96	Timothy Beson	Rep	Bay	3rd
97	Matthew Bierlein	Rep	Bay, Genesee, Saginaw, Tuscola	2nd
98	Gregory Alexander	Rep	Huron, Lapeer, Sanilac, Tuscola	2nd
99	Mike Hoadley	Rep	Arenac, Bay, Clare, Gladwin, Iosco, Ogemaw	2nd
100	Tom Kunse	Rep	Clare, Lake, Mecosta, Osceola	2nd
101	Joseph Fox	Rep	Lake, Mason, Newaygo, Oceana, Wexford	2nd
102	Curt VanderWall	Rep	Manistee, Mason, Muskegon, Oceana	4th
103	Betsy Coffia	Dem	Benzie, Grand Traverse, Leelenau	2nd
104	John Roth	Rep	Antrim, Benzie, Grand Traverse, Kalkaska, Manistee, Wexford	3rd
105	Ken Borton	Rep	Antrim, Crawford, Kalkaska, Missaukee, Oscoda, Otsego, Roscommon	3rd
106	Cam Cavitt	Rep	Alcona, Alpena, Cheboygan, Montmorency, Oscoda, Presque Isle	2nd
107	Parker Fairbairn	Rep	Charlevoix, Chippewa, Emmet, Mackinac	1st
108	David Prestin	Rep	Chippewa, Delta, Luce, Mackinac, Menominee, Schoolcraft	2nd
109	Karl Bohnak	Rep	Alger, Baraga, Dickinson, Marquette	1st
110	Gregory Markkanen	Rep	Dickinson, Gogebic, Houghton, Iron, Keweenaw, Ontonagon	4th

- ↑: First elected in a special election.

== Officials ==
=== Speaker of the House ===
The 77th and current Speaker of the House of Representatives is the presiding officer of the House and the leader of the majority party. The current Speaker is Matt Hall, a Republican from Battle Creek.

The Speaker calls the House to order at the hour to which the House last adjourned, preserves order and decorum in the chamber, recognizes Members to speak, and puts all questions. The Speaker is the chief administrator of the House and is technically the employer of all legislative staff. There is also a Speaker pro tempore and two associate Speakers pro tempore who preside in the absence of the Speaker. The full duties of the Speaker are described in Chapter II of the Rules of the House.

=== Clerk of the House ===
Clerk of the Michigan House of Representatives
- Incumbent; Scott Starr since January 8, 2025
- Style: Mister Clerk
- Appointer: Elected by the House
- Term length: Pleasure of the House (nominally a two-year Legislature)
- Inaugural holder: George R. Griswold

The Clerk of the House of Representatives is elected by Members of the House at the beginning of each two-year term. The 35th and current clerk is Scott Starr. Starr served as assistant clerk from 2023 to 2024. The assistant clerk is Richard J. Brown, who served as clerk from 2007 to 2010 and 2023 to 2024.

Under the rules of the House, the clerk is the parliamentarian of the House, presides in the absence of the Speaker or any Speaker pro tempore, takes roll at the beginning of each session day and announces whether or not a quorum is present, prepares the official calendar and journal of the House, is responsible for the care and preservation of all bills introduced in the House, and for bills sent from the Senate until they are returned to the Senate.

=== Sergeant at Arms ===
The sergeant at arms of the House of Representatives is the chief police officer of the House, appointed by the Speaker. The current chief sergeant at arms is Jon Priebe.

The chief sergeant and the assistant sergeants are empowered as law enforcement officers by statute. The sergeants at arms have authority to serve subpoenas and warrants issued by the House or any duly authorized officer or committee, see that all visitors are seated and at no time are standing on the floor or balconies of the House, ensure that reasonable decorum is maintained in the lobby immediately in front of the entrance to the chamber to ensure access for Members and to ensure equal treatment for all citizens.

== Committees ==
Article IV of the Michigan Constitution authorizes each house of the Legislature to "establish the committees necessary for the conduct of its business." The House does much of its work in committees, including the review of bills, executive oversight, and the budget and appropriations process. Members of committees and their chairmen are appointed by the Speaker. Bills are referred to a committee by the Speaker, and the chairman of a committee sets its agenda, including whether or not a bill will be reported to the full House. The Committee on Appropriations divides its work among subcommittees ordinarily structured by state department or major budget area.

There are also four statutory standing committees: Joint Committee on Administrative Rules; House Fiscal Agency Governing Committee; Legislative Council; Michigan Capitol Committee. Currently, it would appear, the House committees meet on a 'year by year' basis. A full list may be accessed here.

Unlike the Senate, the House does not utilize the committee of the whole.

== House Fiscal Agency ==
House Fiscal Agency
Agency overview
- Headquarters: Cora B. Anderson House Office Building
- Employees: 24
- Annual budget: $4,050,400
- Agency executives: Mary Ann Cleary, Director; Kevin Koorstra, Deputy Director
- Parent department: House Fiscal Agency Governing Board (Michigan House of Representatives)
- Website: house.mi.gov/hfa/

The House Fiscal Agency is a nonpartisan agency within the House of Representatives which provides nonpartisan expertise to members of the House Appropriations Committee, as well as all other Members of the House. Fiscal analysts review the governor's budget recommendation, review and prepare budget bills, supplemental appropriations, and certain transfer requests, provide fiscal impact statements on legislative proposals, monitor state and national situations that may have budgetary implications, research and analyze fiscal issues, prepare reports and documents to assist legislative deliberations, and prepare special reports at the request of Representatives. The economist analyzes legislation related to tax and lottery issues, respond to Representatives' inquiries regarding state tax revenue, revenue sharing, and other economic issues, monitors state revenue, tracks state, and national economic conditions, and prepares reports on revenue and other economic issues. Legislative analysts prepare concise, nonpartisan summaries and analyses of bills. Summaries, completed prior to committee deliberations, describe how a bill would change current law, including any fiscal impact. Analyses are prepared for bills reported to the full House from committee and include, with the summary information, a description of the problem being addressed, arguments for and against the bill, and positions of interested organizations.

The agency is governed by a six-member board consisting of the chairman and minority vice chairman of the Appropriations Committee, the Speaker of the House and the minority leader, and the majority and minority floor leaders. The governing committee is responsible for HFA oversight, establishment of operating procedures, and appointment of the HFA director. The director is one of three state officials charged with annually forecasting the state's revenues at the Consensus Revenue Estimating Conferences, which are held at least twice each year.

In January 1993, a front-page story in The Detroit News detailed a massive scandal in the House Fiscal Agency. For six years, the agency's imprest account was used to finance credit card payments, vacations, and property tax payments as well as payments to HFA employees and contract workers for non-existent workers. The scandal threatened to collapse the joint leadership agreement between the Democrats and Republicans brought about by a 55-55 partisan split in the House from the 1992 election. It resulted in Representative Dominic J. Jacobetti of Negaunee in the Upper Peninsula, the longest-serving Member in history, losing his position as chairman of the powerful Appropriations Committee; the conviction and imprisonment of HFA Director John Morberg; and the resignation of state representative Stephen Shepich as part of a plea bargain.

== See also ==
- Michigan Senate
- 2012 Michigan House of Representatives election
- 2014 Michigan House of Representatives election
- 2016 Michigan House of Representatives election
- 2018 Michigan House of Representatives election
- 2020 Michigan House of Representatives election
- 2022 Michigan House of Representatives election
- 2024 Michigan House of Representatives election
- List of special elections to the Michigan House of Representatives
- List of Michigan state legislatures
