= Abraham Aiyash =

American politician (born 1992)

- أبراهام عياش

Majority Leader of the Michigan House of Representatives
- In office January 1, 2023 – January 8, 2025
- Preceded by: Ben Frederick
- Succeeded by: Bryan Posthumus

Member of the Michigan House of Representatives
- In office December 1, 2020 – December 31, 2024
- Preceded by: Isaac Robinson
- Succeeded by: Joe Tate (redistricting)
- Constituency: 4th district (2020–2022); 9th district (2023–2024)

Personal details
- Born: January 20, 1994 (age 32) Hamtramck, Michigan, U.S.
- Party: Democratic
- Education: Michigan State University (BA)
- Website: Campaign website

Abraham Aiyash (Arabic: أبراهام عياش) is an American politician who served as a member of the Michigan House of Representatives from 2020 to 2024. A member of the Democratic Party, Aiyash served as the chamber's majority floor leader. He represented much of Detroit's Midtown, New Center, North End, Boston Edison, Virginia Park, and all of the city of Hamtramck.

== Early life and education ==
Aiyash was born and raised in Hamtramck, Michigan, the seventh of eight children. His parents immigrated to Michigan from Yemen. Aiyash was educated in the Hamtramck Public Schools and earned a Bachelor of Arts degree from Michigan State University, where he studied pre-medicine, political science, and Muslim studies.

== Career ==
When he was 13, Aiyash worked as a community organizer for the Barack Obama 2008 presidential campaign. In 2015 and 2016, he worked in the office of State Rep. Rose Mary Robinson.

In 2018, Aiyash was a candidate for the Democratic primary to represent Michigan's 2nd Senate district. He finished second after Adam Hollier, who won the general election. During his campaign, Aiyash was endorsed by the Detroit Free Press.

Abraham announced his candidacy for the 4th district of the Michigan House of Representatives following the death of Isaac Robinson in March 2020. In the Democratic primary, Aiyash placed first in a field of 13 candidates. He defeated Republican nominee Howard Weathington, Working Class Party candidate Linda Rayburn, and Independent MD Rabbi Alam in the November general election. He assumed office on December 1, 2020.

In 2023, Aiyash became majority leader of the House of Representatives, the first Arab-American to do so. He also became the highest-ranking Muslim American in the state's legislative history.

Aiyash did not run for reelection in 2024. He was succeeded by Joe Tate in the 9th district, which had been redistricted due to a legal challenge.

== Political positions ==
Aiyash has shown support for clean energy, legislation against pollution and other issues surrounding the environmental and public health.

Aiyash has advanced legislation aimed at gun reform to curb gun violence. Aiyash has proposed legislation to make Eid al-Adha and Eid al-Fitr state holidays.

Aiyash supports expanding civil rights. In 2023, he co-sponsored a bill in the Michigan state legislature which amended the Elliott-Larsen Civil Rights Act to include protections for the LGBTQ community.

On October 12, 2023, 5 days after the October 7 attacks, Aiyash opposed a resolution calling for the support of Israel and condemnation of the attack, saying the resolution fails to recognize the suffering of the Palestinians. Aiyash stated "I think any conversation around what is happening in Israel and Palestine that makes no acknowledgement of the 70-plus year occupation and mistreatment of the Palestinian people is disrespectful.”

== Electoral history ==
2020 Michigan House of Representatives election, District 4
Primary election
Party	Candidate	Votes	%
Democratic	Abraham Aiyash	5,352	38.3
Democratic	Michele Oberholtzer	1,946	13.9
Democratic	Tawanna Simpson	1,520	10.9
Democratic	Tonya Myers Phillips	1,419	10.2
Democratic	Delorean Holmes	1,003	7.2
Democratic	Shahab Ahmed	835	6.0
Total votes		13,962	100
General election
Democratic	Abraham Aiyash	27,263	89.7
Republican	Howard Weathington	1,736	5.7
Working Class Party	Linda Rayburn	1,027	3.4
Independent	MD Rabbi Alam	355	1.2
Total votes		30,377	100

2018 Michigan Senate election, District 2
Primary election
Party	Candidate	Votes	%
Democratic	Adam Hollier	6,938	25.2
Democratic	Abraham Aiyash	5,766	21.0
Democratic	Brian Banks	4,725	17.2
Democratic	Regina Williams	2,598	9.5
Democratic	LaMar Lemmons Jr.	2,512	9.1
Democratic	John Olumba	1,747	6.4
Democratic	George Cushingberry Jr.	1,121	4.1
Democratic	Anam Miah	931	3.4
Democratic	Lawrence Gannan	555	2.0
Democratic	William Phillips	328	1.2
Democratic	Tommy Campbell	265	1.0
Total votes		27,486	100

== See also ==
- History of the Middle Eastern people in Metro Detroit

== Notes ==
Michigan House of Representatives
Preceded by Ben Frederick	Majority Leader of the Michigan House of Representatives; 2023–2025	Succeeded by Bryan Posthumus
