= Abbas Alawieh =

American politician

Member-elect of the Michigan Senate from the 2nd district
- Assuming office January 1, 2027
- Succeeding: Sylvia Santana

Personal details
- Born: Lebanon
- Party: Democratic
- Spouse: Amanda
- Relatives: Fadwa Hammoud (sister)
- Education: University of Michigan (BA), MPH)

Abbas Alawieh is an American politician who is the Democratic member-elect for the 1st district of the Michigan Senate. He was elected in the 2026 Michigan Senate election.

Alawieh co-founded the Uncommitted National Movement, which formed to urge Michigan voters to select "uncommitted" over incumbent president Joe Biden in the 2024 Michigan Democratic presidential primary.

== Early life and education ==
Alawieh was born in Lebanon then immigrated to the United States at 6-years old and grew up in east Dearborn, Michigan. He graduated from the University of Michigan with a degree in anthropology in 2014 followed by a Master of Public Health in 2017.

== Political career ==
Alawieh and Layla Elabed, the sister of U.S. representative Rashida Tlaib, co-founded the Uncommitted National Movement. He was one of two uncommitted delegates from Michigan at the 2024 Democratic National Convention.

Alawieh ran for the 2nd district in the 2026 Michigan Senate election. The seat was held by Democrat Sylvia Santana, who was term-limited. Alawieh defeated Erin Byrnes, a state representative, in the Democratic primary. He won the general election against Republican Harry Sawicki with 70% of the vote.

== Personal life ==
Alawieh resides in Dearborn with his wife, Amanda, and dog, Rocco. His sister, Fadwa Hammoud, served as the Solicitor General of Michigan and later as a deputy attorney general of Michigan.

== Electoral history ==
2026 Michigan's 2nd Senate district Democratic primary
Party	Candidate	Votes	%
Democratic	Abbas Alawieh	23,734	58.88
Democratic	Erin Byrnes	16,578	41.12
Total votes		40,312	100.00

2026 Michigan's 2nd Senate district election
Party	Candidate	Votes	%
Democratic	Abbas Alawieh	72,311	70.68
Republican	Harry Sawicki	27,250	26.64
Working Class	Larry Betts	2,743	2.68
Total votes		102,304	100.00
Democratic hold			
