= Ethel Terrell =

American politician (1926–1994)

Ethel Miller Terrell

Member of the Michigan House of Representatives from the 9th district
- In office January 1, 1979 – 1990
- Preceded by: George H. Edwards
- Succeeded by: Chester Wozniak

Personal details
- Born: February 28, 1926 Uniontown, Alabama
- Died: March 1, 1994 (aged 68) Detroit, Michigan
- Party: Democratic
- Spouse: Rohne
- Education: Art Center Music School of Detroit; Wayne County Community College

Ethel Miller Terrell (February 28, 1926 – March 1, 1994) was a Michigan politician.

== Early life ==
Terrell was born on February 28, 1926, in Uniontown, Alabama, to parents Reverend Julis and Alberta Miller.

== Education ==
Terrell attended the Art Center Music School of Detroit and Wayne County Community College. Terrell earned a degree from Baptist Training Union. Terrell received an honorary Doctor of Law degree from Urban Baptist College in Detroit.

== Career ==
In 1962, Terrell was a candidate in the Democratic primary for the position of delegate to the Michigan state constitutional convention representing the 3rd Senatorial District. In 1964, Terrell was a delegate to Democratic National Convention from Michigan. In 1968, Terrell was elected the Highland Park city council, becoming the first black woman city council member in Michigan and the first woman city council member in Highland Park. On November 7, 1978, Terrell was elected to the Michigan House of Representatives where she represented the 9th district from January 10, 1979, to 1990. She was defeated in the primary for the same position in 1990. In 1988, Terrell unsuccessfully ran in the primary for the position of Michigan state senator representing the 2nd district.

== Personal life ==
Terrell was married to Rohne. She was widowed around 1985. Terrell was Baptist.

== Death ==
Terrell died on March 1, 1994, in Detroit. Her last residence was Highland Park, Michigan.
