= Adam Hollier =

American politician (born 1985)

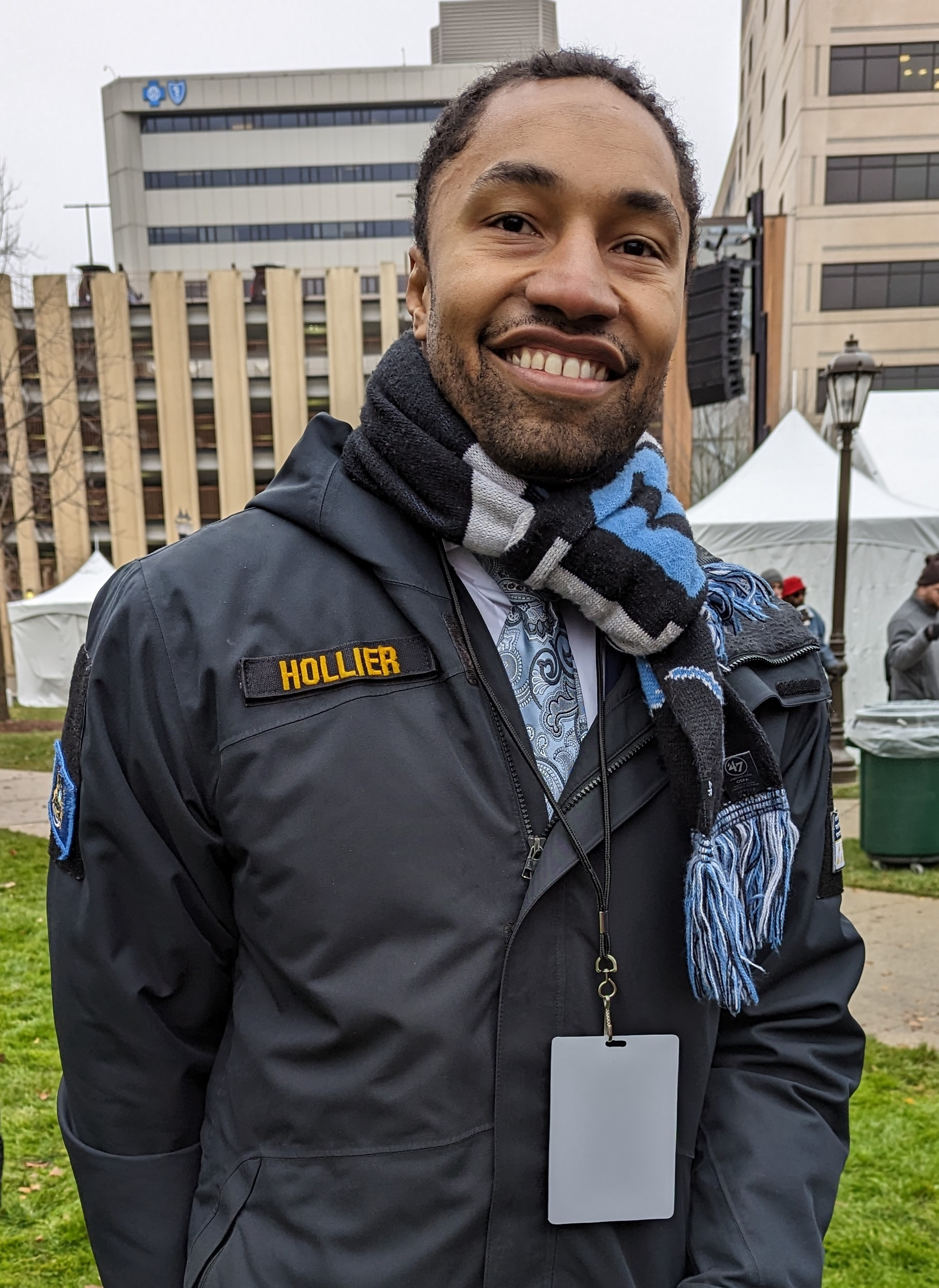

Member of the Michigan Senate from the 2nd district
- In office November 30, 2018 – January 1, 2023
- Preceded by: Bert Johnson
- Succeeded by: Sylvia Santana

Personal details
- Born: September 26, 1985 (age 41) Detroit, Michigan, U.S.
- Party: Democratic
- Spouse: Krystle
- Children: 2
- Education: Cornell University (BA); University of Michigan (MUP)
- Website: Campaign website

Military service
- Allegiance: United States
- Branch/service: United States Army
- Rank: Captain
- Unit: 412th Civil Affairs Battalion

Adam Hollier (OH-lee-eh, born September 26, 1985) is an American politician who was the director of the Michigan Veterans Affairs Agency, appointed by Governor Gretchen Whitmer. Hollier served in the Michigan Senate, representing the 2nd Senate district, serving Wayne County including Detroit, the Grosse Pointes, Hamtramck, Harper Woods, and Highland Park from 2018 to 2022.

== Early life and education ==
Hollier was born and raised in the North End of Detroit, and is a graduate of Detroit Public Schools. He earned a Bachelor of Arts degree in labor relations from Cornell University, where he played safety on the football team and was a decathlete. Hollier enlisted in the United States Army and later served as a civil affairs officer in the United States Army Reserve. He earned a Master of Urban Planning from the University of Michigan.

Hollier is of Black and Native American descent, specifically from the Muscogee Nation.

== Career ==
Hollier served as a volunteer firefighter before enlisting in the United States Army and graduating with distinction from officer candidate school, where he earned the commission of 2nd Lieutenant. Hollier currently serves as a captain paratrooper and team leader in the 412th Civil Affairs Battalion Airborne. Prior to joining the Senate, Hollier served as director of government affairs for the Michigan Fitness Foundation. He began his career in public service in roles as a staffer in the state legislature and with local officials in the city of Detroit, where his efforts were instrumental in developing policies that protected seniors and facilitated the installation of 64,000 new lights to make neighborhoods safe.

In 2013, Hollier ran for the Detroit City Council, and lost to Mary Sheffield. In 2014, Hollier ran in the Michigan House of Representatives 4th district Democratic primary, but lost to incumbent Rose Mary Robinson. He was elected to the Michigan Senate in 2018, and served as the sergeant-at-arms and parliamentarian of the Michigan Legislative Black Caucus.

In 2022, he was a candidate for the Democratic nomination to represent Michigan's 13th congressional district in the House of Representatives.

In the state legislature, Hollier's championed a successful resolution to replace the statue of Lewis Cass in the National Statuary Hall Collection with a statue of Coleman Young, the first Black mayor of Detroit.

On December 2, 2022, Hollier was appointed director of the Michigan Veterans Affairs Agency by Gov. Gretchen Whitmer starting January 1, 2023.

In October 2023, Hollier announced he would launch a primary challenge against incumbent Democrat Shri Thanedar for Michigan's 13th congressional district. However, Hollier was disqualified from the primary ballot in May 2024 for failing to secure enough valid voter petition signatures.

Hollier began a third campaign for the 13th Congressional district in April 2025, but withdrew that September and launched a bid in the 2026 Michigan Secretary of State election. He later withdrew from that election in February 2026, and then filed to run for a second non-consecutive term in the Michigan Senate, in the redrawn 3rd district.

== Personal life ==
Hollier and his wife, Krystle, live in Detroit with their daughter Lillian and son AJ. Hollier enjoys spending time with his family, woodworking, and setting fitness goals in running, CrossFit, and Brazilian jiu-jitsu. He is a member of Alpha Phi Alpha.

== Awards ==
Hollier was named to Michigan Chronicle's 40 under 40 in 2013, Crain's 20 in their 20s in 2015, and the Michigan Chronicle Men of Excellence in 2021.

== Other positions ==
- Assistant Professor of Teaching of Urban Studies and Planning at Wayne State University

Michigan Senate
Preceded by Bert Johnson	Member of the Michigan Senate from the 2nd district 2018–2022	Succeeded by Sylvia Santana
