= M. M. Rose School =

Historic building

Coordinates: 42°22′50″N 83°0′59″W

M. M. Rose School is a historic school building in Detroit. It was built in 1898 and succeeded an earlier one-room M. M. Rose School built in 1886. M. M. Rose (died January 21, 1892) taught at Bishop School and became the principal of the predominantly "Colored" Fourth Ward School that became known as Everett. She worked to elevate its status in the face of discrimination. She became the Detroit Public School District's first female principal. The school is at 5505 Van Dyke.

A new Rose School was built nearby in 1979 and the old school closed when it opened in 1980. The old Rose School building is the oldest extant public school building in Detroit. Its condition is deteriorating. The new Rose School closed in 2007.

== History ==
An appropriation of $25,000 was made for construction of the school in 1897. An additional $5,500 was needed to complete it. Jeannette Lambie Elliott was the school's principal from 1892 until 1894. Kate Robinson was its principal in 1904 when it served Kindergarten to 8th grade.

== See also ==
- List of closed public schools in Detroit
