= Senator Ellis =

Senator Ellis may refer to:

- Affie Ellis (born c. 1979/1980), Wyoming State Senate
- Arthur Ellis (Maryland politician) (born 1961), Maryland State Senate
- Bertram Ellis (1860–1920), New Hampshire State Senate
- Edward D. Ellis (1801–1848), Michigan State Senate
- Frank Burton Ellis (1907–1969), Louisiana State Senate
- Frederick S. Ellis (1830–1880), Wisconsin State Senate
- Jerry Ellis (Oklahoma politician) (born 1946), Oklahoma State Senate
- Johnny Ellis (1960–2022), Alaska State Senate
- Mary Gordon Ellis (1889–1934), South Carolina State Senate
- Michael Ellis (American politician) (1941–2018), Wisconsin State Senate
- Powhatan Ellis (1790–1863), U.S. Senator from Mississippi
- Rodney Ellis (born 1954), Texas State Senate
- William A. Ellis (1828–1900), Wisconsin State Senate
