= Henry Lathrop =

Henry Lathrop may refer to:

- Henry A. Lathrop (1848–1911), American physician and politician
- Henry B. Lathrop (1808–1890), member of the Michigan Senate
