= Lavoy (disambiguation) =

Lavoy is a hamlet in Alberta, Canada. Lavoy or LaVoy may also refer to:

- Bill LaVoy (born 1967), a member of the Michigan House of Representatives
- Bob Lavoy (1926–2010), an American basketball player and coach
- January LaVoy, an American actress
- Lavoy Allen (born 1989), an American basketball player
- Robert LaVoy Finicum, one of the leaders of the 2016 occupation of the Malheur National Wildlife Refuge (killed by Oregon State Police)
