= Leslie Love =

American politician (born 1971)

Member of the Michigan House of Representatives from the 10th district
- In office January 1, 2015 – December 31, 2020
- Preceded by: Phil Cavanagh
- Succeeded by: Mary Cavanagh

Personal details
- Born: July 8, 1971 (age 55) Detroit, Michigan, U.S.
- Party: Democratic
- Education: Siena Heights University (BA); Wayne State University (MFA); Marygrove College (MA)
- Website: Official website

Leslie N. Love (born July 8, 1971) is an American politician and government official. A member of the Democratic Party, Love served in the Michigan House of Representatives from 2014 to 2020. Love represented the 10th District, which encompasses parts of northwest Detroit and Redford Township.

After leaving the state legislature, Love was appointed by Governor Gretchen Whitmer to the Michigan Natural Resources Commission, becoming the first African-American to serve on the commission. She was a candidate to represent Michigan in the U.S. Senate in the 2024 election.

== Education ==
Love attended Detroit Public Schools and graduated from Thomas M. Cooley High School. She received a bachelor's degree from Siena Heights University and master's degrees from Marygrove College and Wayne State University. She lives in Detroit.

== Early career ==
In 1998, she worked as the campaign assistant for California Assemblywoman Marguerite Archie-Hudson and for California Governor Gray Davis as a field organizer.

Love previously worked as the director of theater operations at Marygrove College and served as an adjunct professor for Marygrove College and the Wayne County Community College District.

== Political career ==
In 2014, Love ran for the Michigan House of Representatives and was elected. She served in the body until she was term-limited in 2020.

Love went on to be appointed to the Michigan Natural Resources Commission by Governor Gretchen Whitmer. Upon her appointment, she became the first African-American to serve on the board. Love additionally served assistant deputy director in the Michigan Department of Transportation's (MDOT) Metro-Region.

In 2023, Love announced she would run in the 2024 election for U.S. Senate. If elected, Love would be the first Black Senator from Michigan.
