= Michigan's 17th House of Representatives district =

American legislative district

Michigan's 17th State House of Representatives district
Representative
Laurie Pohutsky; D–Livonia
- Demographics: 43.1% White; 44.6% Black; 3.6% Hispanic; 2.7% Asian; 0.1% Native American; 0.9% Other; 5% Multiracial
- Population (2024): 88,404

Michigan's 17th House of Representatives district is a legislative district within the Michigan House of Representatives located in Wayne County. The district was created in 1965, when the Michigan Supreme Court ordered the reapportionment of state legislative districts from a county-based system to a proportional one following the Supreme Court case Reynolds v. Sims. It is currently represented by Democrat Laurie Pohutsky of Livonia.

== List of representatives ==
Representative	Party	Years	Residence	Notes
J. Harold Stevens	Republican	1965–1968	Detroit	
Weldon Osborne Yeager	Republican	1969–1970	Detroit	
William M. Brodhead	Democratic	1971–1972	Detroit	Redistricted to the 2nd district.
Frank V. Wierzbicki	Democratic	1973–1982	Detroit	Redistricted from the 25th district.
Raymond M. Murphy	Democratic	1983–1992	Detroit	Redistricted to the 7th district.
William R. Keith	Democratic	1993–1994	Garden City	Redistricted from the 33rd district.
Thomas H. Kelly	Democratic	1995–2000	Wayne	Term limited.
Jim A. Plakas	Democratic	2001–2002	Garden City	Redistricted to the 16th district.
Daniel S. Paletko	Democratic	2003–2004	Dearborn Heights	Resigned January 2004 after being appointed mayor of Dearborn Heights.
Andy Dillon	Democratic	2004 (Note: Elected in a 2004 special election to replace Rep. Daniel S. Paletko, who resigned.)–2010	Redford Township	Term limited.
Philip M. Cavanagh	Democratic	2011–2012	Redford Township	Redistricted to the 10th district.
Bill LaVoy	Democratic	2013–2016	Monroe	
Joseph N. Bellino	Republican	2017–2022	Monroe	Term limited.
Laurie Pohutsky	Democratic	2023–present	Livonia	Redistricted from the 19th district.

== Historical district boundaries ==
Map	Description	Apportionment Plan	Notes
	Wayne County (part): Detroit (part)	1964 Apportionment Plan (Note: Referred to as the Austin-Kleiner plan.)	
	Wayne County (part): Dearborn (part); Detroit (part)	1972 Apportionment Plan (Note: Referred to as the Hatcher-Kleiner plan.)	
	Wayne County (part): Detroit (part)	1982 Apportionment Plan	
	Wayne County (part): Garden City; Inkster; Wayne; Westland (part)	1992 Apportionment Plan	
	Wayne County (part): Dearborn Heights (part); Livonia (part); Redford Township	2001 Apportionment Plan	
	Monroe County (part): Ash Township; Berlin Township; Exeter Township; Frenchtown Township; London Township; Monroe; Monroe Township (part); Wayne County (part): Flat Rock; Rockwood; Sumpter Township	2011 Apportionment Plan	
	Wayne County (part): Detroit (part); Livonia (part); Redford Township (part)	2021 Apportionment Plan (Note: Referred to as the Hickory plan.)	

== Recent elections ==
=== 2020s ===
2026 Michigan House of Representatives election
Party	Candidate	Votes	%
Democratic	Laurie Pohutsky (incumbent)	28,107	72.12
Republican	Ken Crider	10,866	27.88
Total votes		38,973	100
Democratic hold			

2024 Michigan House of Representatives election
Party	Candidate	Votes	%
Democratic	Laurie Pohutsky (incumbent)	31,741	69.75
Republican	Rola Makki	13,765	30.25
Total votes		45,506	100
Democratic hold			

2022 Michigan House of Representatives election
Party	Candidate	Votes	%
Democratic	Laurie Pohutsky	24,482	69.04
Republican	Penny Crider	10,980	30.96
Total votes		35,462	100
Democratic gain from Republican			

2020 Michigan House of Representatives election
Party	Candidate	Votes	%
Republican	Joe Bellino, Jr. (incumbent)	28,570	61.53
Democratic	Christopher Slat	17,866	38.47
Total votes		46,436	100
Republican hold			

=== 2010s ===
2018 Michigan House of Representatives election
Party	Candidate	Votes	%
Republican	Joe Bellino, Jr. (incumbent)	18,513	55.66
Democratic	Michelle LaVoy	14,750	44.34
Total votes		33,263	100
Republican hold			

2016 Michigan House of Representatives election
Party	Candidate	Votes	%
Republican	Joe Bellino, Jr.	20,232	52.23
Democratic	Bill LaVoy (incumbent)	17,151	44.27
U.S. Taxpayers'	Jeff Andring	1,355	3.5
Total votes		37,738	100
Republican gain from Democratic			

2014 Michigan House of Representatives election
Party	Candidate	Votes	%
Democratic	Bill LaVoy (incumbent)	14,623	59.62
Republican	Charles Londo	9,903	40.38
Total votes		24,526	100
Democratic hold			

2012 Michigan House of Representatives election
Party	Candidate	Votes	%
Democratic	Bill LaVoy	22,339	61.32
Republican	Anne Rossio	14,092	38.68
Total votes		36,431	100
Democratic hold			

2010 Michigan House of Representatives election
Party	Candidate	Votes	%
Democratic	Phil Cavanagh	16,668	62.54
Republican	Mike Adams	9,985	37.46
Total votes		26,653	100
Democratic hold			

=== 2000s ===
2008 Michigan House of Representatives election
Party	Candidate	Votes	%
Democratic	Andy Dillon (incumbent)	27,864	66.07
Republican	Sandra Eggers	14,311	33.93
Total votes		42,175	100
Democratic hold			

2006 Michigan House of Representatives election
Party	Candidate	Votes	%
Democratic	Andy Dillon (incumbent)	25,158	77.42
Republican	Zhelinrentice Clampitt	7,336	22.58
Total votes		32,494	100
Democratic hold			

2004 Michigan House of Representatives election
Party	Candidate	Votes	%
Democratic	Andy Dillon (incumbent)	25,180	59.29
Republican	Darryl Husk	16,202	38.15
Libertarian	Kerry L. Morgan	1,084	2.55
Total votes		42,466	100
Democratic hold			

2004 Michigan House of Representatives 17th district special election
Party	Candidate	Votes	%
Democratic	Andy Dillon	25,074	60.59
Republican	Darryl Husk	16,306	39.41
Total votes		41,380	100
Democratic hold			

2002 Michigan House of Representatives election
Party	Candidate	Votes	%
Democratic	Daniel S. Paletko	14,772	49.62
Republican	R. Miles Handy	14,091	47.33
Libertarian	Christopher Gonzalez	907	3.05
Total votes		29,770	100
Democratic hold			

2000 Michigan House of Representatives election
Party	Candidate	Votes	%
Democratic	Jim A. Plakas	20,885	76.61
Republican	Delvyn J. Rockwell	6,376	23.39
Total votes		27,261	100
Democratic hold			

=== 1990s ===
1998 Michigan House of Representatives election
Party	Candidate	Votes	%
Democratic	Thomas H. Kelly (incumbent)	14,277	72.63
Republican	Dan Smelser	4,983	25.35
Libertarian	Robert D. Irwin	396	2.01
Total votes		19,656	100
Democratic hold			
