= Gabe Leland =

American politician from Michigan

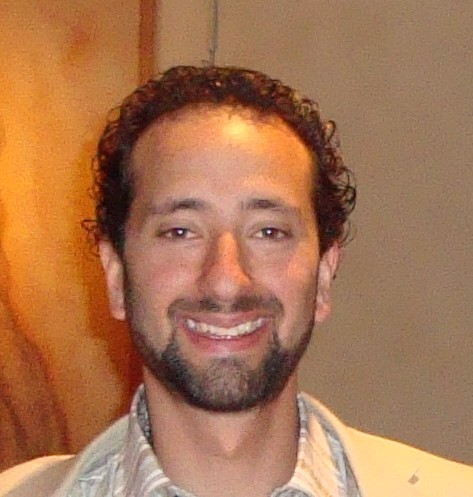

Member of the Detroit City Council from the 7th District
- In office 2013 – May 3, 2021
- Succeeded by: Fred Durhal III (elect)

Member of the Michigan House of Representatives from the 10th district
- In office January 12, 2005 – January 13, 2010
- Preceded by: Triette Reeves
- Succeeded by: Harvey Santana

Personal details
- Born: September 28, 1982 (age 44) Detroit, Michigan
- Party: Democratic
- Education: Central Michigan University

Gabriel Leland (born September 28, 1982) is a former Democratic politician from the state of Michigan. In 2004, Leland was elected to the Michigan State House of Representatives, representing the 10th District, which is located in Wayne County and includes the farwest and partial northwest corner of the city of Detroit. Leland has served on the Detroit City Council from 2013 to 2021, when he resigned and pleaded guilty to misconduct in office.

== Early life ==
Leland attended Kehillat Israel Congregation in Lansing, MI while growing up.

== Political career ==
On November 5, 2013, Leland won the newly created Detroit City Council seat in District 7. It was the narrowest victory in any of the council races, winning by only 50 votes. In 2017, Leland was re-elected with 56% of the vote. He resigned in 2021.

== Legal issues ==
On October 4, 2018, Leland was indicted on charges of two counts of bribery and one count of conspiracy to commit bribery. He was accused of soliciting $15,000 worth of bribes from a local business owner, Robert Carmack. In March 2018, Robert Carmack filed a lawsuit against Leland in federal court for extortion.

In May 2021, Leland pled guilty to felony misconduct and resigned from the city council.

== Electoral history ==
- 2017 campaign for Detroit City Council District 7
  - Gabe Leland, 56%
  - Regina Ross, 44%
- 2013 campaign for Detroit City Council District 7
  - Gabe Leland, 49.11%
  - John K. Bennett, 48.81%
- 2008 campaign for State House
  - Gabe Leland (D), 95%
  - Marc Sosnowski (UST), 5%
- 2008 campaign for State House, Democratic Primary
  - Gabe Leland (D), 68%
  - LaTanya Garrett (D), 27%
  - Brian Sylvester (D), 6%
- 2006 campaign for State House
  - Gabe Leland (D), 94%
  - Thomas Shaut (R), 6%
- 2006 campaign for State House, Democratic Primary
  - Gabe Leland (D), 53%
  - Stephanie Young (D), 28%
  - Barbra Long (D), 8%
  - Ron Johnson (D), 4%
  - Thomas Jackson (D), 3%
- 2004 campaign for State House
  - Gabe Leland (D), 91%
  - Reuben Myers (R), 9%
- 2004 campaign for State House, Democratic Primary
  - Gabe Leland (D), 21%
  - Jim Edmondson, Jr. (D), 18%
  - Barbra Long (D), 17%
  - Shanelle Jackson (D), 17%
  - Carolyn Chambers (D), 10%
  - Ron Johnson (D), 6%
  - Michael Grundy (D), 5%
