= Mary Cavanagh =

American politician (born 1991)

Member of the Michigan Senate from the 6th district
- Incumbent
- Assumed office January 1, 2023
- Preceded by: Erika Geiss

Member of the Michigan House of Representatives from the 10th district
- In office January 1, 2021 – December 31, 2022
- Preceded by: Leslie Love
- Succeeded by: Joe Tate

Personal details
- Born: July 1, 1991 (age 35) Redford Township, Michigan, U.S.
- Party: Democratic
- Parent(s): Phil Cavanagh, Lily Cavanagh
- Education: Wayne State University (BA)
- Profession: Politician
- Website: Mary For Michigan

Mary Cavanagh (born c. 1991) is an American politician serving as a Democratic Party member of the Michigan Senate from the 6th district. She assumed office on January 1, 2023.

== Early life and education ==
Cavanagh was born in Redford Township, Michigan to parents Phil Cavanagh and Lily Cavanagh. In December 2020, Cavanagh earned a bachelor's degree in physical anthropology from Wayne State University. She is the granddaughter of Detroit mayor Jerome Cavanagh who served from 1962 to 1970.

== Career ==
Cavanagh was an AmeriCorps member, and also served as a precinct delegate for Redford Township; a board member of the Michigan Democratic Women's Caucus; and as director of the New Start Construction Company. On August 4, 2020, Cavanagh won the Democratic primary for the Michigan House of Representatives representing the 10th district. Another candidate however, Brenda Hill, had declared victory on and after election day, but after the absentee ballots had been counted, it was shown that she had lost to Cavanagh. Hill, who was in second place in the primary, disputed these results, and called for investigation into the election by Michigan Secretary of State Jocelyn Benson. The fact that Cavanagh's mother was the treasurer of Redford Township was a source of suspicion to Hill. On August 12, Hill had organized a protest at the Redford Township Hall. Later, on December 2, Hill accused Cavanagh of carpetbagging. She claimed Cavanagh lived in Garden City, Michigan, which is outside of the 10th district, and that she did not live in Redford Township with her father as she claimed. On November 3, 2020, Cavanaugh was elected to the state house. She assumed office on January 1, 2021, and where she represented the 10th district.

In 2022, Cavanagh was elected to the Michigan Senate, where she represents the 6th district.

== Criminal charges and conviction ==
On February 25, 2022, Cavanagh was arrested and subsequently charged with operating a non-electric motor vehicle while intoxicated. Video shows her swerving on the road while driving with both driver's side tires flat, and the front one off the rim. After being unable to perform field sobriety tests, she initially refused a breathalyzer, then agreed and blew more than double the legal limit—which under Michigan OWI law is considered "super-drunk" and triggers special penalties. She was previously convicted of drunk driving after pleading guilty to charges in 2015. The Redford Democrat pleaded guilty in April 2022 to operating while intoxicated following her February 25 arrest in the Livonia area. She received the recommended sentence of a $500 fine plus other fines, a 10-day work program, two years of probation and must appear for sobriety court.
