= Olmstead Hough =

American politician (1797–1865)

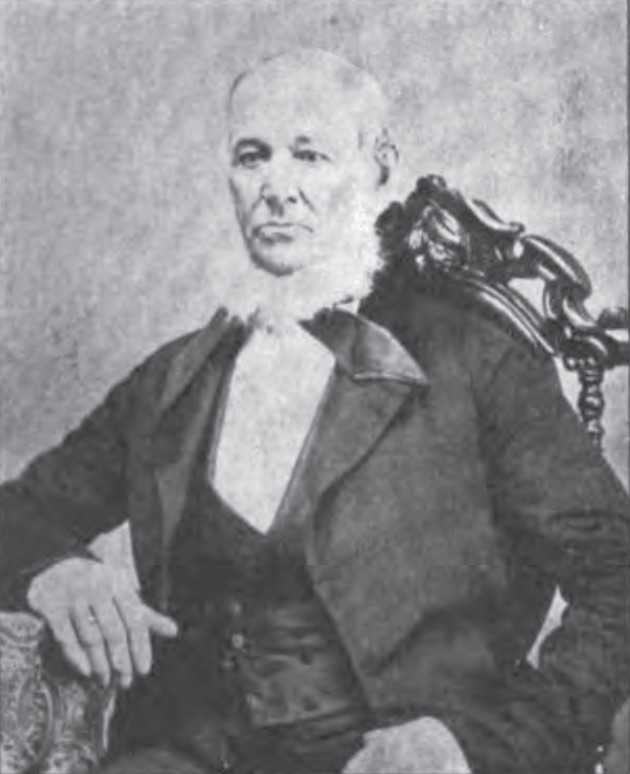

Member of the Michigan Senate from the 2nd district
- In office November 2, 1835 – December 31, 1837

Personal details
- Born: 1797 Columbia County, New York
- Died: December 30, 1865 (aged 67–68) Tecumseh, Michigan
- Party: Democratic

Olmstead Hough (1797 – December 30, 1865), also spelt Olmsted, was an American tradesman and politician. He served in the first two terms of the Michigan Senate after the state constitution was adopted, was sheriff of Lenawee County, Michigan, and served in various other official positions. He also participated in the only incident of shots being fired in the Toledo War between Michigan and Ohio.

== Biography ==
Olmstead Hough was born in 1797 in Columbia County, New York, the son of Revolutionary War veteran Zepheniah Hough. When he was four, the family moved to Schuyler, New York. From the age of fourteen to eighteen, he was an apprentice to a relative as a carpenter and millwright, a trade which he pursued until 1830. That year, he was elected to the New York Legislature and served one term. He moved to Michigan Territory in 1831 and settled on a farm on the road between Tecumseh and Saline.

In April 1835, while Michigan and Ohio were at odds over a strip of land along their common border, Hough was part of a posse that went into Ohio to disrupt the work of a surveying party. Here he took part in the Battle of Phillips Corners, the only confrontation of the Toledo War that resulted in shots being fired, though nobody was injured.

He was sergeant-at-arms at the state constitutional convention in 1835, and in the election that year for the new Michigan Legislature, he was elected as a Democrat to represent Lenawee County in the Michigan Senate. President Martin Van Buren appointed him register of the land office in Detroit in 1838 and he served until 1840. He was elected sheriff of Lenawee County in 1844 and served until 1848. He also represented the town of Tecumseh on the county board of supervisors for several years, and moved into Tecumseh itself in 1863.

He died in Tecumseh on December 30, 1865.

=== Family ===
Hough married Julia Ann Boughton in 1820. They had a son, Flavius J. Hough, who went on to serve as sheriff of Lenawee County himself from 1860 to 1864. She died on April 4, 1829, and the following year he married Mary Boughton. They had a son, Lucius L., who served in the Union Army during the U.S. Civil War.
