= Maureen Stapleton (politician) =

American politician and educator from Michigan

Member of the Michigan House of Representatives from the 4th district
- In office January 1, 2011 – January 1, 2013
- Preceded by: Coleman Young II
- Succeeded by: Rose Mary Robinson

Personal details
- Party: Democratic
- Education: Howard University (BS)

Maureen Stapleton is an American politician from Michigan, and a former teacher. She is a former Democratic member of Michigan House of Representatives from District 4.

== Education ==
Stapleton earned a BS degree in Psychology from Howard University in Washington, D.C. Stapleton was a member of Alpha Kappa Alpha sorority.

== Career ==
Stapleton was a teacher with Detroit Public Schools. Stapleton was an Administrator for the City of Indianapolis' Compliance Division. In 2003, Stapleton started a consulting business.

In the August 2006 primary election, Stapleton was seeking for a seat in the Michigan House of Representatives for District 4, but she was defeated by Coleman Young II. Stapleton lost by 928 votes.

In 2010, Stapleton ran again the Michigan House for District 4. Stapleton defeated Mary Sheffield in the Democratic primary and defeated Lillian Smith and Danetta Simpson with 94.89% of the votes. In the August 2012 primary election, Stapleton was seeking a seat in the newly created District 6, however, she was defeated by Rashida Tlaib. Stapleton lost by 683 votes.

== See also ==
- 2010 Michigan House of Representatives election
