= Seba Murphy =

American politician (1788–1856)

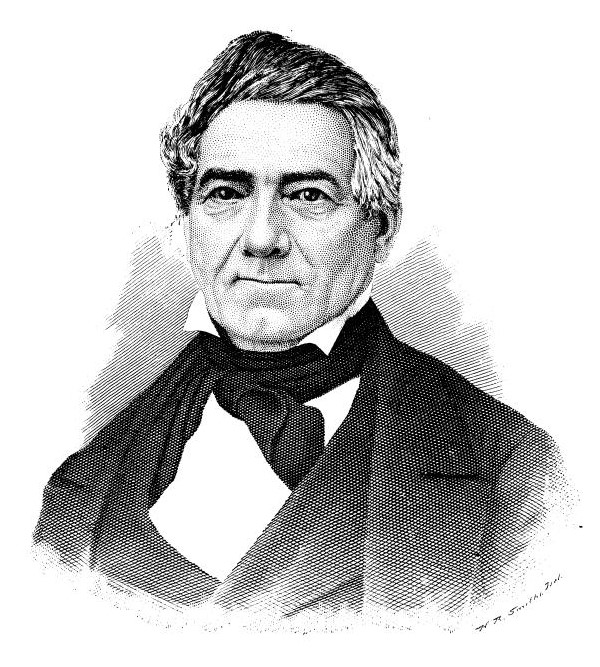
Portrait of Seba Murphy

Seba Murphy (July 25, 1788 – November 16, 1856) was an American businessman and politician.

Murphy was born in Scituate, Rhode Island, on July 25, 1788. He went into the mercantile business in Schenectady, New York, and was there associated with the merchant house of DeGraff, Walton & Co.. He was sent to Canada in 1812 to manage a branch house there, but was forced to flee on the outbreak of the War of 1812. With a group of other Americans, he attempted to cross the ice from Bath, New Brunswick to Cape Vincent, but a severe snowstorm caused the group to lose their way, and Murphy fell into the ice. He was rescued by a British picket guard, who took him as a prisoner of war to Kingston, Ontario where, his feet having frozen and become gangrenous, both were amputated. He remained in British custody until Bill Johnston, a prominent Patriot known as "The Lake Pirate", rescued him with the help of members of the Masonic order of Bath, who concealed him in the bottom of a sleigh filled with bags of oats and drove him thus to Prescott, and then overnight across the river to Ogdensburg.

Murphy returned to Schenectady until the Spring of 1818, when he moved to Ovid, Seneca County, where he entered business with Colonel Philip R. Tull and for two consecutive terms held the office of county clerk. While there he joined the Presbyterian Church, of which he remained a devout member for the rest of his life. In 1835, he moved to Monroe, Michigan, where he served as a county commissioner, register of deeds, and county treasurer. For many years he was the financial agent in Monroe of the Michigan Southern Railway Company. He was appointed to the Board of Regents of the University of Michigan following the resignation of Robert McClelland on December 1, 1837, and served until his own resignation on July 1, 1839. He was also a Democratic member of the Michigan State Senate representing the 2nd district from 1840 to 1841.

He married Margaret Davy, with whom he had one son, William Walton Murphy, and four daughters.

He died in Monroe on November 16, 1856.
