= Harvey Santana =

American politician from Michigan

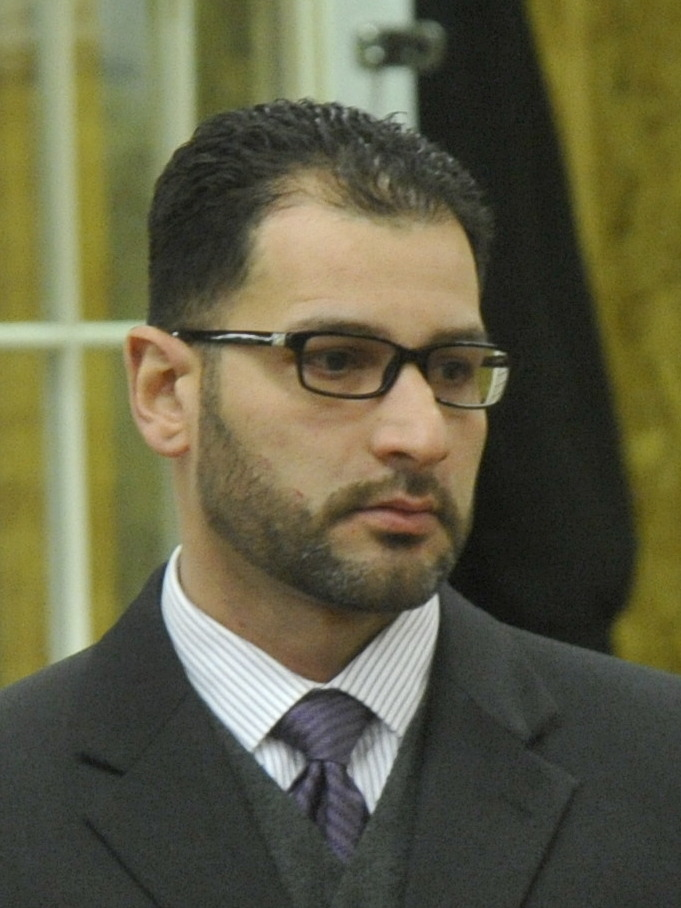
- Santana in 2014

Member of the Michigan House of Representatives from the 9th district
- In office January 1, 2013 – December 31, 2016
- Preceded by: Shanelle Jackson
- Succeeded by: Sylvia Santana

Member of the Michigan House of Representatives from the 10th district
- In office January 1, 2011 – December 31, 2012
- Preceded by: Gabe Leland
- Succeeded by: Phil Cavanagh

Personal details
- Born: July 10, 1972 (age 54) Detroit, Michigan, U.S.
- Party: Democratic
- Spouse: Sylvia Santana
- Children: 3
- Education: Eastern Michigan University
- Profession: Urban Planner

Military service
- Branch: United States Navy
- Rank: Petty Officer Third Class
- Conflict: Gulf War

Harvey Santana (born July 10, 1972) is an American politician and urban planner who served as a member of the Michigan House of Representatives from 2011 to 2016.

== Career ==
=== Early career ===
Prior to his election to the legislature, Santana served in the United States Navy, serving overseas in Operation Desert Shield/Desert Storm, Bosnia, Somalia and Haiti. Santana was a transportation planner for an engineering firm in the private sector. He was president of the Warrendale Community Organization and served as a legislative assistant to Detroit City Council President Kenneth Cockrel Jr.

=== Politics ===
Santana entered a crowded, nine-person field for the Democratic nomination in the 10th District in the Michigan House of Representatives to succeed state incumbent Gabe Leland, who was term-limited. Santana was announced as the winner of election night, taking 35 percent, beating his nearest opponent Stacy Pugh, by just 82 votes. Due to the small margin of his victory, Pugh requested a recount. Santana was later declared the winner by the State's Board of Canvassers, defeating Pugh by 85 votes.

In December 2011, Santana made headlines when he lunged at fellow Democratic state Rep. David Nathan during a heated exchange on the House floor. After the altercation, Santana was temporarily removed from the House floor and the rest of the chamber was ordered to stay at their desks, which was termed by some at the state Capitol as an "adult time-out."

In 2015, Santana was expelled from the Democratic caucus in the Michigan House of Representatives for accepting a committee assignment from Republican House Speaker Kevin Cotter that House Minority Leader Tim Greimel wanted to go to Rep. Brandon Dillon. Santana criticized House Democratic leadership and despite being removed from the caucus, he would continue to work with Democrats and Republicans to best serve the interests of his district.

=== Later career ===
In January 2017, Santana was tapped by Governor Rick Snyder to work in the Office of Urban Initiatives. His work focused on assisting members of the Detroit caucus advance legislation as well as corrections reform.

Santana transitioned his political career into law enforcement and became a Wayne County Sheriff Deputy in 2018.

== Election results ==
Michigan's 10th state House of Representatives District Democratic Primary, 2010
Party	Candidate	Votes	%	±%
Democratic	Harvey Santana	1,915	34.7	N/A
Democratic	Stacy Pugh	1,830	33.2	N/A
Democratic	David Stephen	752	13.6	N/A
Democratic	Mia Griller	530	9.6	N/A
Democratic	Quentin Mallory	150	2.7	N/A
Democratic	Angy Webb	138	2.5	N/A
Democratic	Angela V. Stotts-McClary	121	2.2	N/A
Democratic	Sean C. Thomas	48	0.9	N/A
Democratic	Khalid Irvin	37	0.7	N/A

Michigan's 10th state House of Representatives District General Election, 2010
Party	Candidate	Votes	%
Democratic	Harvey Santana	14,017	94.0
Republican	Jasmine Ford	896	6.0
Democratic hold			

Michigan's 9th state House of Representatives District Democratic Primary, 2012
Party	Candidate	Votes	%	±%
Democratic	Harvey Santana	4,875	65.7	N/A
Democratic	Hussein Berry	1,275	17.2	N/A
Democratic	William Scott Phillips	1,267	17.1	N/A

Michigan's 9th state House of Representatives District General Election, 2012
Party	Candidate	Votes	%
Democratic	Harvey Santana	32,063	95.3
Republican	Rene Simpson	1,567	4.7
Democratic hold			

Michigan's 9th state House of Representatives District Democratic Primary, 2014
Party	Candidate	Votes	%	±%
Democratic	Harvey Santana (I)	4,953	75.3	+9.6
Democratic	Hussein Berry	1,627	24.7	+7.5

Michigan's 9th state House of Representatives District General Election, 2014
Party	Candidate	Votes	%
Democratic	Harvey Santana (I)	17,606	95.5
Republican	James Stephens	827	4.5
Democratic hold			
