= Buzz Thomas =

American politician (born 1969)

Samuel 'Buzz' Thomas

Member of the Michigan Senate from the 4th district
- In office January 1, 2003 – January 1, 2011
- Preceded by: Jackie Vaughn III
- Succeeded by: Virgil Smith Jr.

Member of the Michigan House of Representatives from the 10th district
- In office January 1, 1997 – January 1, 2003
- Preceded by: Nelson W. Saunders
- Succeeded by: Triette Reeves

Personal details
- Born: January 28, 1969 (age 57)
- Party: Democratic

Samuel 'Buzz' Thomas (born January 28, 1969) is a politician from the U.S. state of Michigan. He was a Democratic member of the Michigan Senate, representing the 4th district beginning in 2003 and served as the Democratic Floor Leader until 2011 when he reached his two term limit. His district is completely located in the city of Detroit and includes portions of northwest, east, central, and southwest Detroit. Previously he was a member of the Michigan House of Representatives from 1997 to 2002.

== Early life ==
Thomas was born in Detroit in 1969 and is a graduate of Detroit Country Day School and the University of Pennsylvania. Before becoming an elected official he worked as a homebuilder in metro Detroit, where he was Construction Manager for Parkside Building Company and Avis Tech Park partners, managing both commercial renovations and single-family, residential construction. He also held senior positions with US Representatives from Michigan, Barbara-Rose Collins and Bob Carr (Michigan politician).

== Political career ==
In 1996, one hundred and four years after his great grand uncle, William Webb Ferguson, was the first African-American elected to the Michigan Legislature, Thomas was elected to the Michigan State House of Representatives. He represented the 10th district, located in northwest Detroit. He served in the House for six years. In 2002, he was elected by his House colleagues as the House Democratic Leader, one of the youngest members ever elected to that position and only the second African American elected as a House leader.

In 2002 he was elected to the Michigan Senate and re-elected in 2006. In 2007, his colleagues once again elected him to a leadership position, as the Senate Democratic Floor Leader. He is one of the few Michigan legislators to have held leadership positions in both the Michigan House and Senate.

== Recognition ==
Senator Thomas received many recognitions for his service, including being named one of Michigan’s five “Key Technology Leaders” by the Detroit Free Press, One Of Four Up-And-Coming Leaders by Savoy, “Most Dedicated Detroiter” and “Best Local Politician” by Real Detroit Magazine, "A Rising Star" by both The Detroit News and Hotline, and an "Under-40 Political 'Buzz' Saw" by the Michigan Front Page. He has received awards and recognition from over two dozen community groups, publications, and organizations.

== Committees ==
Buzz Thomas was the ranking Democrat on the Economic Development and Regulatory Reform Committee. He also served on the Homeland Security and Emerging Technologies Committee and on the Energy Policy Committee.

== Electoral history ==
- 2006 Election for the Michigan State Senate - 4th District

Name	Percent
Buzz Thomas (D)	96%
Karen Fobbs (R)	4%

- 2002 Election for the Michigan State Senate - 4th District

Name	Percent
Buzz Thomas (D)	96%
Karen Mastney (R)	4%

- 2000 Election for the Michigan State House

Name	Percent
Buzz Thomas (D)	97%
Martin Royster (R)	3%

- 1998 Election for the Michigan State House

Name	Percent
Buzz Thomas (D)	96%
Richard Henry (R)	4%

- 1996 Election for the Michigan State House

Name	Percent
Buzz Thomas (D)	96%
Richard Henry (R)	3%
