= Michigan's 2nd Senate district =

American legislative district

Michigan's 2nd State Senate district
Senator
Sylvia Santana; D–Detroit
- Demographics: 63.4% White; 22.9% Black; 8.4% Hispanic; 1.1% Asian; 0.1% Native American; 0.3% Other; 3.8% Multiracial
- Population (2024): 253,220

Michigan's 2nd Senate district is one of 38 districts in the Michigan Senate. It has been represented by Democrat Sylvia Santana since 2023, succeeding fellow Democrat Adam Hollier.

== Geography ==
District 2 encompasses part of Wayne County.

=== 2011 Apportionment Plan ===
District 2, as dictated by the 2011 Apportionment Plan, was based in northern Detroit in Wayne County, also covering the nearby communities of Highland Park, Hamtramck, Harper Woods, Grosse Pointe Woods, Grosse Pointe Shores, Grosse Pointe Farms, Grosse Pointe, and Grosse Pointe Park. It shared a water border with Canada along Lake St. Clair.

The district overlapped with Michigan's 13th and 14th congressional districts, and with the 1st, 2nd, 3rd, 4th, 5th, 6th, and 7th districts of the Michigan House of Representatives.

== List of senators ==
Senator	Party	Dates	Residence	Notes
Laurent Durocher	Democratic	1835–1836	Monroe	
Edward D. Ellis	Democratic	1835–1837	Monroe	
Olmstead Hough	Democratic	1835–1837	Tecumseh	
Anthony McKey	Democratic	1837–1838	Deerfield	
Norman D. Curtis	Democratic	1838–1839	Monroe	
Warner Wing	Democratic	1838–1839	Monroe	
William L. Greenly	Democratic	1839–1840	Adrian	
John J. Adam	Democratic	1840–1841	Clinton	
Seba Murphy	Democratic	1840–1841	Monroe	
Elisha P. Champlin	Whig	1841	Jonesville	
Edward L. Fuller	Whig	1842	Ann Arbor	
James Kingsley	Democratic	1842	Ann Arbor	
Henry Compton	Democratic	1843–1844	Ypsilanti	
Robert Wilson	Democratic	1843–1844	Ann Arbor	
Edwin M. Cust	Democratic	1842–1845	Hamburg	
Charles P. Bush	Democratic	1846–1847	Genoa	
Henry B. Lathrop	Whig	1847	Jackson	
John Allen	Democratic	1845–1848	Ann Arbor	
Samuel Denton	Democratic	1845–1848	Ann Arbor	
William Finley Jr.	Democratic	1849–1850	Ann Arbor	
Dwight Webb	Democratic	1849–1850	Ann Arbor	
Nelson Gordon Isbell	Whig	1848–1852	Howell	
Michael Shoemaker	Democratic	1848–1852	Jackson County	
Barnabas Case	Democratic	1851–1852	Manchester	
George Danforth	Democratic	1851–1852	Ann Arbor	
The 1850 Michigan Constitution takes effect, changing the district from a multi-member district to a single-member district.
Alexander H. Stowell	Democratic	1853–1854	Detroit	
George Jerome	Republican	1855–1858	Detroit	
Henry Barnes	Republican	1859–1860	Detroit	
Henry P. Baldwin	Republican	1861–1862	Detroit	
William C. Duncan	Democratic	1863–1864	Detroit	
Joseph Godfrey	Democratic	1865–1866	Detroit	
Alanson Sheley	Republican	1867–1868	Detroit	
Lorenzo M. Mason	Democratic	1869–1870	Detroit	
Alanson Sheley	Republican	1871–1872	Detroit	
David M. Richardson	Republican	1873–1874	Detroit	
John Greusel	Republican	1875–1876	Detroit	
Theodore H. Hinchman	Democratic	1877–1878	Detroit	
Thomas W. Palmer	Republican	1879–1880	Detroit	
John Greusel	Republican	1881–1884	Detroit	
Thomas D. Hawley	Democratic	1885–1886	Detroit	
Calvin B. Crosby	Republican	1887–1888	Plymouth	
Theodore Rentz	Democratic	1889–1890	Detroit	
Joseph M. Weiss	Republican	1891–1894	Detroit	
William G. Thompson	Republican	1895–1898	Detroit	
Albert Stoll	Republican	1899–1900	Detroit	
James O. Murfin	Republican	1901–1902	Detroit	
Charles C. Simons	Republican	1903–1904	Detroit	
John Donald M. MacKay	Republican	1905–1908	Detroit	
Gustav A. Krueger	Republican	1909–1910	Detroit	
James A. Murtha	Democratic	1911–1918	Detroit	
Vincent M. Brennan	Republican	1919–1920	Detroit	
John W. Smith	Republican	1921–1922	Detroit	
Joseph Bahorski	Republican	1923–1926	Detroit	
Cass J. Jankowski	Republican	1927–1930	Detroit	Died in office.
George G. Sadowski	Democratic	1931–1932	Detroit	
Anthony J. Wilkowski	Democratic	1933–1938	Detroit	
Leo J. Wilkowski	Democratic	1939–1944	Detroit	
Anthony J. Wilkowski	Democratic	1945–1946	Detroit	
Joseph A. Brown	Democratic	1947–1948	Detroit	
Anthony J. Wilkowski	Democratic	1949–1950	Detroit	
Bristoe Bryant	Democratic	1951–1952	Detroit	
Cora M. Brown	Democratic	1953–1954	Detroit	
Stanley F. Rozycki (Note: Anthony J. Wilkowski was elected in the 1954 general election, but was denied his seat by a Michigan Supreme Court ruling, due to a 1936 conviction for election recount fraud. Stanley F. Rozycki was elected in a special election in 1955.)	Democratic	1955–1964	Detroit	
Charles N. Youngblood Jr.	Democratic	1965–1974	Detroit	Resigned.
John C. Hertel	Democratic	1974–1982	Harper Woods	
Basil W. Brown	Democratic	1983–1988	Detroit	Resigned.
Virgil C. Smith	Democratic	1988–2000	Detroit	Resigned.
Martha G. Scott	Democratic	2001–2010	Detroit	
Bert Johnson	Democratic	2011–2018	Detroit	Resigned.
Adam Hollier	Democratic	2018–2022	Detroit	
Sylvia Santana	Democratic	2023–present	Detroit	
Abbas Alawieh	Democratic	(Note: Member-elect.)		

== Recent election results ==
=== 2020s ===
2026 Michigan Senate election
Primary election
Party	Candidate	Votes	%
Democratic	Abbas Alawieh	23,734	58.88
Democratic	Erin Byrnes	16,578	41.12
Total votes		40,312	100
Republican	Harry Sawicki	9,068	100
Total votes		9,068	100
General election
Democratic	Abbas Alawieh	72,311	70.68
Republican	Harry Sawicki	27,250	26.64
Working Class	Larry Darnell Betts	2,743	2.68
Total votes		102,304	100
Democratic hold			

2022 Michigan Senate election, District 2
Primary election
Party	Candidate	Votes	%
Democratic	Sylvia Santana (incumbent)	15,020	80.7
Democratic	Maurice Sanders	3,599	19.3
Total votes		18,619	100
General election
Democratic	Sylvia Santana (incumbent)	43,258	68.0
Republican	Harry T. Sawicki	18,726	29.4
Working Class	Larry Darnell Betts	1,632	2.6
Write-in Candidate	Michael Lynn Beasley	4	0.01
Total votes		63,620	100
Democratic hold			

=== 2018 ===
Following incumbent Bert Johnson's resignation, a special election and a regular election were held concurrently in 2018; in the special election, Adam Hollier won the primary against a similar slate of candidates and won the general election uncontested.

2018 Michigan Senate election, District 2
Primary election
Party	Candidate	Votes	%
Democratic	Adam Hollier	6,938	25.2
Democratic	Abraham Aiyash	5,766	21.0
Democratic	Brian Banks	4,725	17.2
Democratic	Regina Williams	2,598	9.5
Democratic	LaMar Lemmons Jr.	2,512	9.1
Democratic	John Olumba	1,747	6.4
Democratic	George Cushingberry Jr.	1,121	4.1
Democratic	Anam Miah	931	3.4
Democratic	Lawrence Gannan	555	2.0
Democratic	William Phillips	328	1.2
Democratic	Tommy Campbell	265	1.0
Total votes		27,486	100
Republican	Lisa Papas	3,879	54.1
Republican	John Hauler	3,289	45.9
Total votes		7,168	100
General election
Democratic	Adam Hollier	53,920	75.7
Republican	Lisa Papas	17,288	24.3
Total votes		71,209	100
Democratic hold			

=== 2014 ===
2014 Michigan Senate election, District 2
Primary election
Party	Candidate	Votes	%
Democratic	Bert Johnson (incumbent)	10,407	63.0
Democratic	John Olumba	3,663	22.2
Democratic	Georgia Lemmons	1,733	10.5
Democratic	Taras Nykoriak	721	4.4
Total votes		16,524	100
General election
Democratic	Bert Johnson (incumbent)	41,452	71.6
Republican	Mark Price	14,354	24.8
Independent	Jeff Hall	2,088	3.6
Total votes		57,894	100
Democratic hold			

=== Federal and statewide results ===
Year	Office	Results
2020	President	Biden 78.5 – 20.5%
2018	Senate	Stabenow 74.9 – 23.4%
2018	Governor	Whitmer 76.4 – 21.6%
2016	President	Clinton 77.4 – 19.9%
2014	Senate	Peters 75.0 – 22.7%
2014	Governor	Schauer 66.3 – 32.5%
2012	President	Obama 80.4 – 19.2%
2012	Senate	Stabenow 80.4 – 17.4%

== Historical district boundaries ==
Map	Description	Apportionment Plan	Notes
	Wayne County (part); Detroit (part); Grosse Pointe Township; Grosse Pointe Woods; Harper Woods	1964 Apportionment Plan	
	Wayne County (part); Detroit (part); Grosse Pointe Woods (part); Hamtramck; Harper Woods	1972 Apportionment Plan	
	Wayne County (part); Detroit (part); Hamtramck; Highland Park	1982 Apportionment Plan	
	Wayne County (part); Detroit (part); Hamtramck; Highland Park	1992 Apportionment Plan	
	Wayne County (part); Detroit (part); Grosse Pointe; Grosse Pointe Farms; Grosse Pointe Park; Grosse Pointe Township; Grosse Pointe Woods; Hamtramck; Harper Woods; Highland Park	2001 Apportionment Plan	
	Wayne County (part); Detroit (part); Grosse Pointe; Grosse Pointe Farms; Grosse Pointe Park; Grosse Pointe Shores; Grosse Pointe Woods; Hamtramck; Harper Woods; Highland Park	2011 Apportionment Plan	
