= Joe Bellino (politician) =

American politician (born 1958)

Member of the Michigan Senate from the 16th district
- Incumbent
- Assumed office January 1, 2023
- Preceded by: Mike Shirkey

Member of the Michigan House of Representatives from the 17th district
- In office January 1, 2017 – January 1, 2023
- Preceded by: Bill LaVoy
- Succeeded by: Laurie Pohutsky

Personal details
- Born: June 10, 1958 (age 68) Monroe, Michigan, U.S.
- Party: Republican
- Spouse: Peggy Bellino
- Children: 3
- Education: Monroe County Community College
- Occupation: Politician
- Website: Senator Joe Bellino

Joseph N. Bellino Jr. is an American politician and businessman from Michigan. Bellino is a Republican member of the Michigan Senate.

== Early life ==
On June 10, 1958, Bellino was born in Monroe, Michigan.

== Education ==
Bellino earned a degree from Monroe County Community College.

== Career ==
Bellino was a businessman as an owner of Broadway Market.

On November 8, 2016, Bellino won the election and became a Republican member of Michigan House of Representatives for District 17. Bellino defeated Bill LaVoy and Jeff Andring with 52.23% of the votes. On November 6, 2018, as an incumbent, Bellino won the election and continued serving District 17. Bellino defeated Michelle LaVoy.

On November 8, 2022, Bellino was elected to the Michigan Senate, where he represents the 16th district.

Bellino was named the most conservative member of the Michigan Senate in 2025.

== Personal life ==
Bellino's wife is Peggy Bellino. They have three children. Bellino is Catholic.

Bellino is a member of the Knights of Columbus, Exchange Club, and St. Mary Church choir.

Political offices
Preceded by Bill LaVoy	Michigan Representatives; 17th District; 2019–2022	Succeeded by Laurie Pohutsky
Preceded by Mike Shirkey	Michigan Senate; 16th District; 2023–present	Succeeded by Incumbent
