= Shanelle Jackson =

American politician (born 1980)

Member of the Michigan House of Representatives from the 9th district
- In office January 1, 2007 – December 31, 2012
- Preceded by: Tupac A. Hunter
- Succeeded by: Harvey Santana

Personal details
- Born: June 15, 1980 (age 46) Detroit, Michigan, U.S.
- Party: Democratic
- Education: University of Michigan (BA); Marygrove College (MA)

Shanelle Jackson (born June 15, 1980) is an American politician who served in the Michigan House of Representatives from the 9th district from 2007 to 2012, and later worked in the private sector.

Jackson earned a B.A. from the University of Michigan in political science and an M.A. from Marygrove College in social justice.
