= Isaac Robinson (politician) =

American politician (1975–2020)

Member of the Michigan House of Representatives from the 4th district
- In office January 1, 2019 – March 29, 2020
- Preceded by: Rose Mary Robinson
- Succeeded by: Abraham Aiyash

Personal details
- Born: William Isaac Robinson; August 21, 1975 Lansing, Michigan, U.S.
- Died: March 29, 2020 (aged 44) Detroit, Michigan, U.S.
- Party: Democratic
- Parents: Roger Robinson (father); Rose Mary Robinson (mother)
- Education: University of Michigan (BGS); Northwestern University (JD)

William Isaac Robinson (August 21, 1975 – March 29, 2020) was an American attorney and politician who served in the Michigan House of Representatives as a member of the Democratic Party from 2019 to 2020.

== Early life and education ==
William Isaac Robinson was born on August 21, 1975, in Lansing, Michigan to Rose Mary Robinson, an activist and politician. In 1998, Robinson earned a Bachelor of General Studies from the University of Michigan and Juris Doctor from the Northwestern University Pritzker School of Law in 2001.

== Career ==
Robinson became a law clerk for United Automobile Workers. In 2003, Robinson became a political director of Michigan Teamsters Joint Council #43 until 2010. In 2012, Robinson started his own law firm.

=== Politics ===
Robinson's mother represented the 4th district in the Michigan House of Representatives from 2013 to 2019. After his mother was prohibited from seeking a fourth term due to term limits, Isaac was part of a crowded field in the Democratic primary to replace her. He won the Democratic primary against thirteen other candidates and easily won in the Democratic-majority district in the general election.

In February 2020, he endorsed Senator Bernie Sanders for the Democratic presidential nomination for the 2020 presidential election. Robinson also served as vice chair for Sanders' Michigan campaign in the Democratic primary. He was a member of the Detroit chapter of the Democratic Socialists of America.

While in the House of Representatives, Robinson served on the Tax Policy, Commerce and Tourism, and Regulatory Reform committees. During the COVID-19 pandemic Robinson supported legislation that would temporarily suspend evictions, foreclosures, and shutting off utilities for ninety days and drafted legislation that would have removed waiting periods for unemployment benefits.

== Death ==
On March 29, 2020, Robinson was taken to Detroit Receiving Hospital due to breathing problems and later died. Robinson's death is suspected of being caused by COVID-19 infection. He was 44 years old. Following his death, he was praised by Governor Gretchen Whitmer, Michigan State Attorney General Dana Nessel, Michigan House Speaker Lee Chatfield, Michigan House Minority Leader Christine Greig, and Congresswoman Rashida Tlaib.

Robinson was succeeded as representative by Abraham Aiyash.

== Electoral history ==
2018 Michigan House of Representatives 4th district election
Primary election
Party	Candidate	Votes	%
Democratic	Isaac Robinson	2,381	21.23%
Democratic	Saad Almasmari	1,765	15.74%
Democratic	Michele Oberholtzer	1,750	15.60%
Democratic	Rico Razo	1,115	9.94%
Democratic	Syed Rob	953	8.50%
Democratic	Myya Jones	877	7.82%
Democratic	Diane McMillan	657	5.86%
Democratic	Jeffrey Nolish	560	4.99%
Democratic	Matt Friedrichs	324	2.89%
Democratic	Christopher Collins	297	2.65%
Democratic	Ernest T. Little	236	2.10%
Democratic	MD Rabbi Alam	162	1.44%
Democratic	Derek Boston	71	0.63%
Democratic	Justin Jessop	68	0.61%
Total votes		11,217	100.00%
General election
Democratic	Isaac Robinson	20,209	94.58%
Republican	Howard Weathington	1,159	5.42%
Total votes		21,368	100.00%

== See also ==
- List of Democratic Socialists of America who have held office in the United States

Political offices
Preceded by Rose Mary Robinson	Michigan Representatives; 4th District; 2019–2020	Succeeded by Abraham Aiyash
