= Cora Brown =

American politician (1914–1972)

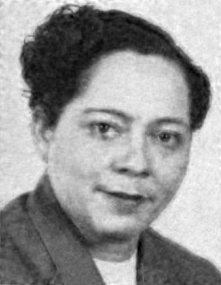

Member of the Michigan Senate from the 2nd district
- In office January 14, 1953 – December 31, 1954
- Preceded by: Bristoe Bryant
- Succeeded by: Stanley F. Rozycki

Member of the Michigan Senate from the 3rd district
- In office January 12, 1955 – December 31, 1956
- Preceded by: Charles Diggs
- Succeeded by: Basil W. Brown

Personal details
- Born: Cora Mae Brown; April 19, 1914 Bessemer, Alabama, U.S.
- Died: December 17, 1972 (aged 58)
- Party: Democratic
- Education: Cass Technical High School; Fisk University

Cora Mae Brown (April 19, 1914 – December 17, 1972) was the first African-American woman elected (rather than appointed) to a state senate in the United States. She won her seat in the Michigan Senate in 1952. Brown was a Democrat who represented Detroit.

== Early life ==
Cora Mae Brown was Richard and Alice Brown's only child. She was born in Bessemer, Alabama on April 19, 1914. When better economic conditions did not appear for their family when they moved to Birmingham, her grandparents urged her parents to move north to Michigan. At 8, she moved to Detroit, Michigan, with her family. There, her father established a tailor shop that was supported by Detroit automotive workers. They occupied a neighborhood that was racially diverse.

== Education ==
Brown enrolled at the Bishop School when her parents moved the family to Detroit in 1922 and she had her first experiences with racial discrimination at the school. A German classmate called her "schwarze" or "black woman," using negative connotations.

In 1931, she graduated from Cass Technical High School and entered Fisk University, a historically black college in Nashville, Tennessee. She originally intended to study medicine, but found it too difficult to look at the medical cadavers. She quickly changed her concentration to sociological work. During her time at Fisk, she studied sociology with renowned sociologist E. Franklin Frazier and received an A.B. degree. To manage college expenses Brown worked at a Detroit Urban League summer camp for underprivileged children. Brown was known for being particularly active in campus political movements as a student (1931-1935). This commitment was inspired by her strong reaction to the lynching of a young black man accused of rape in Columbia, Tennessee. Her actions on campus indicate her lifelong commitment to social justice.

Following graduation, Brown returned to Detroit where she worked from 1941 to 1946 as a policewoman in the Detroit Police Department's Women's Division. Many of her cases involved criminal law. This inspired her to attend Wayne State University's law school, she would pass the bar examination two weeks after her graduation in 1948. Though she did not focus on criminal law during her time in school, Brown remained interested in this pursuit.

== Legal career ==
Upon graduation from Fisk University in 1935, Brown took advantage of the need for social workers created by the 1929 economic crash. For another five years, she assisted the homeless of Detroit deal with the effects of the Great Depression.

At 37, Brown worked as a fines lawyer in Detroit. She made a comfortable living and resided with her mother.

In August 1957, Brown was the first African-American woman appointed as the special associate general counsel of the U.S. Post Office, and she served in that position until 1960. Following her work with the U.S. Post Office, she moved to Los Angeles. She opened a small practice there and practiced law until her return to Detroit in 1970.

Brown was involved in several civil rights and community building organizations. Brown worked with the NAACP, YWCA, the Alpha Kappa Alpha sorority, and the New Calvary Baptist Church.

== Political career and involvement ==
Brown's political involvement began during her time at Fisk University. As a student she participated in demonstrations and was praised by writer Edward T. Clayton for her "willingness to battle injustice."

In 1950 and 1951, she ran for a seat on the Michigan State Senate but was defeated. This seat had been up for special election after senator Wilkowski had been accused of election fraud. Her experience in these two campaigns allowed her to make more competitive decisions in her 1952 race. She went door to door and sent trucks around Detroit to spread her message to voters, this campaign was based on her desire to improve hospital, social services, and to decrease racial inequality.

Brown's campaign victory in 1952 allowed her to serve two terms (1953-1956). At the time, a Michigan State Senate term was about two years. She served as the state senator for the 2nd District during her first term and served for the 3rd District during her second term. Throughout her time in the Senate, she worked on committees for welfare, public utilities, and health. Brown fought strongly for civil rights and introduced several bills that aided their expansion in Michigan. One such bill increased punishments given to restaurants and hotels that were racially discriminatory from $25 to $100. Another, introduced in 1956, ordered the removal of licenses of business that discriminated on the basis of race. Brown is also noted to be a women's rights activist, as she worked to curb the distribution of pornography through the mail. Newspapers hailed her as the "champion of the underprivileged."

At times, Brown clashed with her colleagues in the Democratic Party. Her devotion to issues like education, civil rights, health, and labor often challenged more conservative members of her party. She made the decision to change her district in her 1956 run for office, challenging another Democrat who was quite popular. She told constituents not to vote for representatives who would not openly support the Civil Rights Movement, costing her the support of the United Auto Workers Union and the Democratic Party.

She supported Dwight Eisenhower when he ran for re-election in 1956 over the Democratic candidate Adlai Stevenson, because of his views on civil rights. The same year, Brown attempted to win a seat in Congress. Her candidacy in the Democratic Primary for US representative from Michigan's 1st District was announced following her 1956 selection as the Outstanding Woman Legislator of the year. Ultimately, Brown lacked the support of her party in the election. She would lose by 6,491 votes. In 1957, she was appointed as the special associate general counsel of the US Post Office, where she would work until the Democrats returned to power in 1960. Tracy was the first black woman to hold this post. Later, Brown served as executive director of the President's Committee on Government Contracts, a committee formed to regulate fair employment practices by government contractors. Following ten years in private practice, she returned to Detroit (1970) and joined the Michigan Employment Security Commission as a referee.

== In popular culture ==
A portrait of Brown, painted by Detroit artist Telitha Cumi Bowens, was included in the 1988/89 exhibit Ain't I A Woman at the Museum of African American History, Detroit. The exhibit featured a dozen prominent Black women from the state of Michigan, including Ethelene Crockett, Violet T. Lewis and Lucy Thurman.

== See also ==
- List of African-American firsts
- List of people from Detroit
- Michigan Women's Hall of Fame
