= Statue of Lewis Cass =

Public art

Lewis Cass
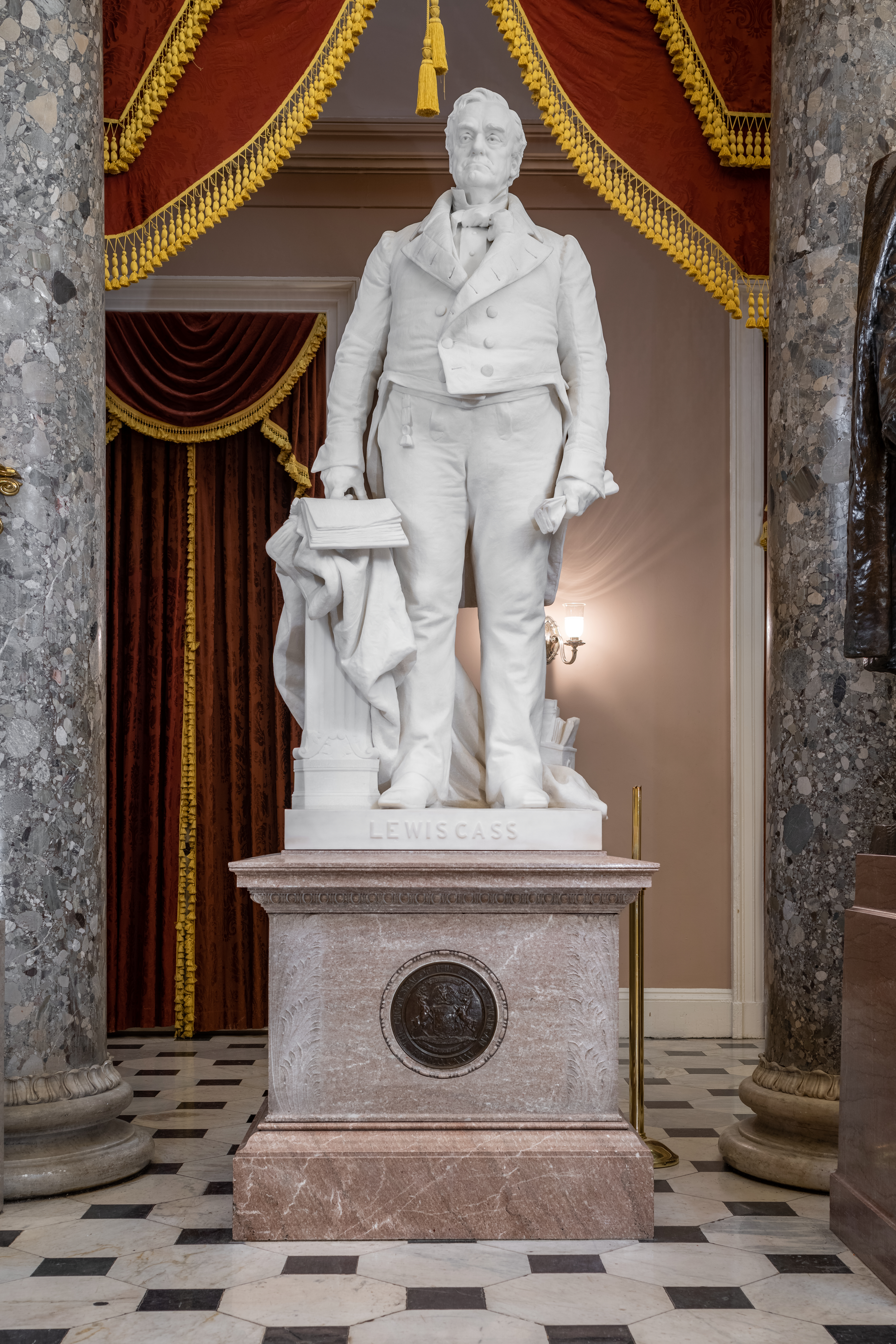
- The statue in the National Statuary Hall in 2023
- Artist: Daniel Chester French
- Year: 1889
- Medium: Marble sculpture
- Subject: Lewis Cass
- Location: Washington, D.C., United States

Lewis Cass is an 1889 marble sculpture by Daniel Chester French of Lewis Cass, a soldier, diplomat, and politician that the state of Michigan donated as their first statue to the National Statuary Hall Collection in Washington, D.C., United States.

== Description and history ==
French received the commission and decided to make the statue in Paris. He dressed his figure, a "biography in stone", of the rather portly Cass in the swallow tailed coat popular in that time, and depicted him standing solidly with his weight evenly distributed on both legs. This stance was criticized in Paris as being an out-dated way to portray a subject, but French was more interested in the "benediction of approval" he received from American artist George Peter Alexander Healy, who had been both a friend and the painter of a portrait of Cass.

When French was finished producing his clay statue he had it carved in marble in Paris, a task that would take a year, before executing the final touches himself and then having the finished work shipped to the United States. There it was unveiled in the Capitol on February 18, 1889. At this event Michigan Senator Thomas Witherell Palmer said of Cass that he knew of "no public man who has filled so many places in the economy of life-teacher, explorer, negotiator of treaties, governor, pioneer, lawyer, legislator, marshal, soldier, diplomat Secretary of War, Senator, Secretary of State".

On December 6, 2022, the Michigan Legislature adopted a resolution, championed by State Senator Adam Hollier, to replace the Cass statue in the National Statuary Hall with a statue of Coleman Young, the first Black mayor of Detroit.

== See also ==
- 1889 in art
- Public sculptures by Daniel Chester French
