= Regina Ross (politician) =

American politician

Member-elect of the Michigan House of Representatives from the 4th district
- Assuming office January 1, 2027
- Succeeding: Karen Whitsett

Personal details
- Party: Democratic
- Website: www.reginaross.com

Regina Ross is an American politician who is the member-elect for the 4th district of the Michigan House of Representatives. She was elected at the 2026 election. She is an educator in Detroit.
