= Michigan's 10th House of Representatives district =

American legislative district

Michigan's 10th State House of Representatives district
Representative
Veronica Paiz; D–Harper Woods
- Demographics: 47.9% White; 44.7% Black; 1.8% Hispanic; 1.2% Asian; 0.1% Native American; 0.3% Other; 4.2% Multiracial
- Population (2024): 93,580

Michigan's 10th House of Representatives district is a legislative district within the Michigan House of Representatives located in Wayne County. The district was created in 1965, when the Michigan Supreme Court ordered the reapportionment of state legislative districts from a county-based system to a proportional one following the Supreme Court case Reynolds v. Sims. It is currently represented by Democrat Veronica Paiz of Harper Woods.

== List of representatives ==
Representative	Party	Years	Residence	Notes
David S. Holmes Jr.	Democratic	1965–1972	Detroit	Reapportioned from the former Wayne County, 11th district; redistricted to the 21st district.
Michael Novak	Democratic	1973–1976	Detroit	Redistricted from the 13th district.
Virgil Clark Smith Jr.	Democratic	1977–1988	Detroit	Resigned March 1988 after being elected to the Michigan Senate.
Ted Wallace	Democratic	1988 (Note: Elected in a 1988 special election to replace Rep. Virgil Clark Smith Jr., who resigned.)–1992	Detroit	Redistricted to the 5th district.
Nelson W. Saunders	Democratic	1993–1996	Detroit	Redistricted from the 7th district.
Samuel "Buzz" Thomas III	Democratic	1997–2002	Detroit	Term limited.
Triette Lipsey Reeves	Democratic	2003–2004	Detroit	Redistricted from the 13th district; term limited.
Gabe Leland	Democratic	2005–2010	Detroit	Term limited.
Harvey Santana	Democratic	2011–2012	Detroit	Redistricted to the 9th district.
Philip M. Cavanagh	Democratic	2013–2014	Redford Township	Redistricted from the 17th district.
Leslie Love	Democratic	2015–2020	Detroit (until around 2018); Redford Township	Term limited.
Mary Cavanagh	Democratic	2021–2022	Redford Township	
Joseph Tate	Democratic	2023–2025	Detroit	Redistricted from the 2nd district; redistricted to the 9th district.
Veronica Paiz	Democratic	2025–present	Harper Woods	Redistricted from the 11th district.

== Historical district boundaries ==
Map	Description	Apportionment Plan	Notes
	Wayne County (part): Detroit (part)	1964 Apportionment Plan (Note: Referred to as the Austin-Kleiner plan.)	
	Wayne County (part): Detroit (part)	1972 Apportionment Plan (Note: Referred to as the Hatcher-Kleiner plan.)	
	Wayne County (part): Detroit (part)	1982 Apportionment Plan	
	Wayne County (part): Detroit (part)	1992 Apportionment Plan	
	Wayne County (part): Detroit (part)	2001 Apportionment Plan	
	Wayne County (part): Detroit (part); Redford Township	2011 Apportionment Plan	
	Macomb County (part): Grosse Pointe Shores (part); Wayne County (part): Detroit (part); Grosse Pointe; Grosse Pointe Farms; Grosse Pointe Park; Grosse Pointe Shores (part); Grosse Pointe Woods	2021 Apportionment Plan (Note: Referred to as the Hickory plan.)	
	Wayne County (part): Detroit (part); Grosse Pointe; Grosse Pointe Farms; Grosse Pointe Park; Grosse Pointe Shores (part); Grosse Pointe Woods (part); Harper Woods	Remedial 2021 Apportionment Plan Approved in 2024 (Note: Referred to as the Motown Sound FC E1 plan.)	

== Recent elections ==
=== 2020s ===
2026 Michigan House of Representatives election
Party	Candidate	Votes	%
Democratic	Veronica Paiz (incumbent)	30,878	69.2
Republican	Peter Ochs	12,866	28.83
Working Class	Piper Willow Smith	880	1.97
Total votes		44,624	100
Democratic hold			

2024 Michigan House of Representatives election
Party	Candidate	Votes	%
Democratic	Veronica Paiz	34,025	67.44
Republican	Griffin Wojtowicz	16,426	32.56
Total votes		50,451	100
Democratic hold			

2022 Michigan House of Representatives election
Party	Candidate	Votes	%
Democratic	Joe Tate	28,064	68.43
Republican	Mark Corcoran	12,948	31.57
Total votes		41,012	100
Democratic hold			

2020 Michigan House of Representatives election
Party	Candidate	Votes	%
Democratic	Mary Cavanagh	38,144	84.75
Republican	Cathy L. Alcorn	6,863	15.25
Total votes		45,007	100
Democratic hold			

=== 2010s ===
2018 Michigan House of Representatives election
Party	Candidate	Votes	%
Democratic	Leslie Love (incumbent)	28,713	84.01
Republican	William Brang	4,837	14.15
Libertarian	Jeremy Morgan	630	1.84
Total votes		34,180	100
Democratic hold			

2016 Michigan House of Representatives election
Party	Candidate	Votes	%
Democratic	Leslie Love (incumbent)	32,787	81.62
Republican	William Brang	6,027	15
Libertarian	Jeremy Morgan	1,357	3.38
Total votes		40,171	100
Democratic hold			

2014 Michigan House of Representatives election
Party	Candidate	Votes	%
Democratic	Leslie Love	21,583	82.25
Republican	Matthew X. Hauser	4,658	17.75
Total votes		26,241	100
Democratic hold			

2012 Michigan House of Representatives election
Party	Candidate	Votes	%
Democratic	Phil Cavanagh	36,190	86.43
Republican	Jasmine Bridges	5,682	13.57
Total votes		41,872	100
Democratic hold			

2010 Michigan House of Representatives election
Party	Candidate	Votes	%
Democratic	Harvey Santana	14,017	93.99
Republican	Jasmine Ford	896	6.01
Total votes		14,913	100
Democratic hold			

=== 2000s ===
2008 Michigan House of Representatives election
Party	Candidate	Votes	%
Democratic	Gabe Leland (incumbent)	27,635	94.82
U.S. Taxpayers'	Marc Joseph Sosnowski	1,510	5.18
Total votes		29,145	100
Democratic hold			

2006 Michigan House of Representatives election
Party	Candidate	Votes	%
Democratic	Gabe Leland (incumbent)	18,364	94.01
Republican	Thomas J. Schaut	1,171	5.99
Total votes		19,535	100
Democratic hold			

2004 Michigan House of Representatives election
Party	Candidate	Votes	%
Democratic	Gabe Leland	25,660	90.7
Republican	Reuben Myers	2,631	9.3
Total votes		28,291	100
Democratic hold			

2002 Michigan House of Representatives election
Party	Candidate	Votes	%
Democratic	Triette Lipsey Reeves	16,005	89.22
Republican	John T. Nazars	1,535	8.56
Green	Alan Jacobson	398	2.22
Total votes		17,938	100
Democratic hold			

2000 Michigan House of Representatives election
Party	Candidate	Votes	%
Democratic	Samuel Buzz Thomas, III (incumbent)	30,319	97.48
Republican	Martin Royster	785	2.52
Total votes		31,104	100
Democratic hold			

=== 1990s ===
1998 Michigan House of Representatives election
Party	Candidate	Votes	%
Democratic	Samuel Buzz Thomas, III (incumbent)	24,374	96.43
Republican	Richard Henry	902	3.57
Total votes		25,276	100
Democratic hold			
