= Triette Reeves =

American minister and politician

Member of the Michigan House of Representatives from the 5th district
- In office November 1992 – 1993
- Preceded by: Teola P. Hunter (resigned)
- Succeeded by: Ted Wallace

Member of the Michigan House of Representatives from the 13th district
- In office January 1, 1999 – December 2002
- Preceded by: Burton Leland
- Succeeded by: Barbara Farrah

Member of the Michigan House of Representatives from the 10th district
- In office January 1, 2003 – December 2004
- Preceded by: Buzz Thomas
- Succeeded by: Gabe Leland

Personal details
- Born: Triette E. Lipsey; August 22, 1963 (age 63) Detroit, Michigan
- Party: Democratic
- Spouse: Alando Reeves
- Children: 3
- Education: Michigan State University
- Occupation: Minister, politician

Triette Lipsey Reeves (born August 22, 1963) is an American politician and minister from Michigan.

== Early life ==
On August 22, 1963, Reeves was born as Triette E. Lipsey in Detroit, Michigan. In 1982, Reeves graduated from Redford High School.

== Education ==
Reeves earned a Bachelor of Arts degree in public administration from Michigan State University.

== Career ==
Reeves started her political career as a Legislative Aide to Teola P. Hunter, a member of Michigan House of Representatives for District 5. In January 1992, Teola P. Hunter resigned. On November 3, 1992, Reeves won the special election and became a Democratic member of Michigan House of Representatives for District 5.

In 1995, Reeves served the Detroit city council, until 1998.

In 1995, Reeves became a minister for the Mount Zion Church.

On November 3, 1998, Reeves won the election and became a member of Michigan House of Representatives for District 13. Reeves defeated Leodis Brown with 89.60% of the vote. On November 7, 2000, as an incumbent, Reeves won the election and continued serving District 13. Reeves defeated Ernestine Nelson with 92.32% of the vote.

On November 5, 2002, Reeves won the election and became a Democratic member of Michigan House of Representatives for District 10. Reeves defeated John T. Nazars and Alan Jacobson with 89.22% of the vote. Reeves served in the Michigan House of Representatives until 2004.

== Personal life ==
In 1995, Reeves married Alando Reeves. They have three children. Reeves and her family live in Detroit, Michigan.

== See also ==
- 2002 Michigan House of Representatives election
