= Bristoe Bryant =

American politician (1906–1986)

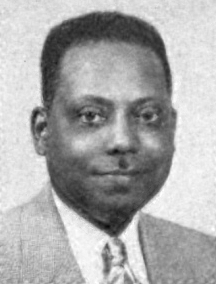

Member of the Michigan Senate from the 2nd district
- In office April 16, 1951 – 1952
- Preceded by: Anthony J. Wilkowski
- Succeeded by: Cora Brown

Personal details
- Born: February 27, 1906 Huntingdon, Tennessee
- Died: 1986 (aged 79-80)
- Party: Democratic
- Education: Cass Technical High School

Bristoe Bryant (February 27, 1906 – 1986) was a Michigan politician.

== Early life ==
Bryant was born on February 27, 1906, in Huntingdon, Tennessee.

== Education ==
Bryant graduated from Cass Technical High School and attended Wayne State University.

== Career ==
On April 2, 1951, Bryant was elected to the Michigan Senate where he represented the 2nd district from April 16, 1951, to 1952. Bryant was a candidate in the Democratic primary for the position of United States Representative from Michigan's 16th District.

== Personal life ==
Bryant was a member of the Elks and was a Freemason. Bryant was an African Methodist Episcopal.

== Death ==
Bryant died in 1986.
