= Joseph A. Brown =

American politician (1903–1963)

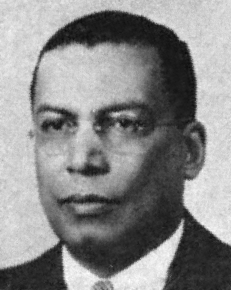

Member of the Michigan Senate from the 2nd district
- In office January 1, 1947 – 1948
- Preceded by: Anthony J. Wilkowski
- Succeeded by: Anthony J. Wilkowski

Personal details
- Born: February 10, 1903 Knoxville, Tennessee
- Died: January 16, 1963 (aged 59)
- Party: Democratic
- Spouse: Lucille Nuttall
- Education: Virginia Union College; University of Detroit

Joseph A. Brown (February 10, 1903 – January 16, 1963) was a Michigan politician.

== Education ==
Brown graduated from a public school in Pittsburgh, Pennsylvania. Brown earned a Bachelors of Arts degree from Virginia Union College and a Bachelor of Laws degree from the University of Detroit.

== Career ==
Brown was a lawyer. On November 5, 1946, Brown was elected to the Michigan Senate where he represented the 2nd district from 1947 to 1948. In 1948, Brown lost the Democratic primary for the same position. Also in 1948, Brown was a delegate to Democratic National Convention from Michigan.

== Personal life and death ==
Brown was born on February 10, 1903, in Knoxville, Tennessee. He was of African ancestry.

Brown married Lucille Nuttall in 1933. Brown was a member of the Elks and was a Freemason. He was a Baptist.

Brown died on January 16, 1963.
