= Michigan's 9th House of Representatives district =

American legislative district

Michigan's 9th State House of Representatives district
Representative
Joe Tate; D–Detroit
- Demographics: 21.1% White; 67.9% Black; 2.9% Hispanic; 3.8% Asian; 0.2% Native American; 0.7% Other; 3.4% Multiracial
- Population (2024): 90,874

Michigan's 9th House of Representatives district is a legislative district within the Michigan House of Representatives located in Wayne County. The district was created in 1965, when the Michigan Supreme Court ordered the reapportionment of state legislative districts from a county-based system to a proportional one following the Supreme Court case Reynolds v. Sims. It is currently represented by Democrat Joe Tate of Detroit.

== List of representatives ==
Representative	Party	Years	Residence	Notes
Rosetta A. Ferguson	Democratic	1965–1972	Detroit	Redistricted to the 20th district.
George H. Edwards	Democratic	1973–1978	Detroit	Redistricted from the 12th district.
Ethel Terrell	Democratic	1979–1990	Highland Park	
Chester Wozniak	Democratic	1991–1992	Hamtramck	Previously served in the former Wayne County, 14th district.
Carolyn Cheeks Kilpatrick	Democratic	1993–1996	Detroit	Redistricted from the 8th district.
Kwame Kilpatrick	Democratic	1997–2001	Detroit	Resigned December 2001 to become mayor of Detroit.
Frederick Durhal Jr.	Democratic	2002 (Note: Elected in a 2002 special election to replace Rep. Kwame Kilpatrick, who resigned.)	Detroit	
Tupac A. Hunter	Democratic	2003–2006	Detroit	
Shanelle Jackson	Democratic	2007–2012	Detroit	Term limited.
Harvey Santana	Democratic	2013–2016	Detroit	Redistricted from the 10th district; term limited.
Sylvia Santana	Democratic	2017–2018	Detroit	
Karen S. Whitsett	Democratic	2019–2022	Detroit	Redistricted to the 4th district.
Abraham Aiyash	Democratic	2023–2025	Hamtramck	Redistricted from the 4th district.
Joseph Tate	Democratic	2025–present	Detroit	Redistricted from the 10th district.
Willie Burton	Democratic	(Note: Member-elect.)	Detroit	

== Historical district boundaries ==
Map	Description	Apportionment Plan	Notes
	Wayne County (part): Detroit (part)	1964 Apportionment Plan (Note: Referred to as the Austin-Kleiner plan.)	
	Wayne County (part): Detroit (part); Highland Park	1972 Apportionment Plan (Note: Referred to as the Hatcher-Kleiner plan.)	
	Wayne County (part): Detroit (part); Hamtramck; Highland Park	1982 Apportionment Plan	
	Wayne County (part): Detroit (part)	1992 Apportionment Plan	
	Wayne County (part): Detroit (part)	2001 Apportionment Plan	
	Wayne County (part): Dearborn (part); Detroit (part)	2011 Apportionment Plan	
	Wayne County (part): Detroit (part); Hamtramck	2021 Apportionment Plan (Note: Referred to as the Hickory plan.)	
	Wayne County (part): Detroit (part)	Remedial 2021 Apportionment Plan Approved in 2024 (Note: Referred to as the Motown Sound FC E1 plan.)	

== Recent elections ==
=== 2020s ===
2026 Michigan House of Representatives election
Party	Candidate	Votes	%
Democratic	Willie Burton	28,785	92.12
Republican	Michele Lundgren	1,509	4.83
Working Class	Logan Ausherman	512	1.41
Green	Jahdante John Elijah Smith	440	1.64
Total votes		31,246	100
Democratic hold			

2024 Michigan House of Representatives election
Party	Candidate	Votes	%
Democratic	Joe Tate	33,310	93
Republican	Michele Lundgren	2,509	7
Total votes		35,819	100
Democratic hold			

2022 Michigan House of Representatives election
Party	Candidate	Votes	%
Democratic	Abraham Aiyash	17,821	91.6
Republican	Michele Lundgren	1,634	8.4
Total votes		19,455	100
Democratic hold			

2020 Michigan House of Representatives election
Party	Candidate	Votes	%
Democratic	Karen Whitsett (incumbent)	29,047	94.18
Republican	James Stephens	1,794	5.82
Total votes		30,841	100
Democratic hold			

=== 2010s ===
2018 Michigan House of Representatives election
Party	Candidate	Votes	%
Democratic	Karen Whitsett	20,783	95.13
Republican	James Stephens	1,065	4.87
Total votes		21,848	100
Democratic hold			

2016 Michigan House of Representatives election
Party	Candidate	Votes	%
Democratic	Sylvia Santana	27,560	94.29
Republican	James Stephens	1,668	5.71
Total votes		29,228	100
Democratic hold			

2014 Michigan House of Representatives election
Party	Candidate	Votes	%
Democratic	Harvey Santana (incumbent)	17,606	95.51
Republican	James Stephens	827	4.49
Total votes		18,433	100
Democratic hold			

2012 Michigan House of Representatives election
Party	Candidate	Votes	%
Democratic	Harvey Santana	32,063	95.34
Republican	Rene Simpson	1,567	4.66
Total votes		33,630	100
Democratic hold			

2010 Michigan House of Representatives election
Party	Candidate	Votes	%
Democratic	Shanelle Jackson (incumbent)	19,300	94.98
Republican	David Porter	694	3.42
Independent	Kenneth L. Haney	188	0.93
Independent	D'Artagnan M. Collier	138	0.68
Total votes		20,320	100
Democratic hold			

=== 2000s ===
2008 Michigan House of Representatives election
Party	Candidate	Votes	%
Democratic	Shanelle Jackson (incumbent)	34,062	100
Total votes		34,062	100
Democratic hold			

2006 Michigan House of Representatives election
Party	Candidate	Votes	%
Democratic	Shanelle Jackson	23,260	93.71
Independent	Ron March	1,559	6.28
Write-In	Richard A. Zeile	1	0
Total votes		24,820	100
Democratic hold			

2004 Michigan House of Representatives election
Party	Candidate	Votes	%
Democratic	Tupac A. Hunter (incumbent)	33,020	95.02
Republican	Richard A. Zeile	1,729	4.98
Total votes		34,749	100
Democratic hold			

2002 Michigan House of Representatives election
Party	Candidate	Votes	%
Democratic	Tupac A. Hunter	22,098	94.47
Republican	Richard A. Zeile	1,294	5.53
Total votes		23,392	100
Democratic hold			

2002 Michigan House of Representatives 9th district special election
Party	Candidate	Votes	%
Democratic	Fred Durhal, Jr.	948	100
Total votes		948	100
Democratic hold			

2000 Michigan House of Representatives election
Party	Candidate	Votes	%
Democratic	Kwame Kilpatrick (incumbent)	19,893	96.02
Republican	Lydia R. Polley	620	2.99
Libertarian	Kenneth E. Vojtech	205	0.99
Total votes		20,718	100
Democratic hold			

=== 1990s ===
1998 Michigan House of Representatives election
Party	Candidate	Votes	%
Democratic	Kwame Kilpatrick (incumbent)	15,877	95.4
Republican	Kimberly Carpenter	766	4.6
Total votes		16,643	100
Democratic hold			
