= Phil Cavanagh =

American politician from Michigan

Member of the Michigan House of Representatives from the 10th district
- In office January 1, 2013 – December 31, 2014
- Preceded by: Harvey Santana
- Succeeded by: Leslie Love

Member of the Michigan House of Representatives from the 17th district
- In office January 1, 2011 – December 31, 2012
- Preceded by: Andy Dillon
- Succeeded by: Bill LaVoy

Personal details
- Party: Democratic
- Spouse: Lily Cavanagh
- Children: 3, including Mary Cavanagh
- Parent: Jerome Cavanagh (father)
- Education: Aquinas College and University of Detroit Mercy
- Occupation: Attorney, politician
- Committees: Tax Policy, Energy and Technology, and Judiciary Committees
- Website: Website

Phil Cavanagh is an American politician from Michigan. Cavanagh is a former member of the Michigan House of Representatives from the 10th District (previously the 17th District before redistricting). He is the son of Jerome Cavanagh, who was Mayor of Detroit from 1962 to 1970.

He ran unsuccessfully for Executive of Wayne County, losing to Warren Evans in the primary.

== Personal life ==
Cavanagh's wife is Lily Cavanagh. They have three daughters. Cavanagh and his family live in Redford, Michigan. One of his daughters, Mary Cavanagh, was sworn in as a State Representative on January 1, 2021 and a State Senator on January 1, 2023.
