= Karen Whitsett =

American politician (born 1967)

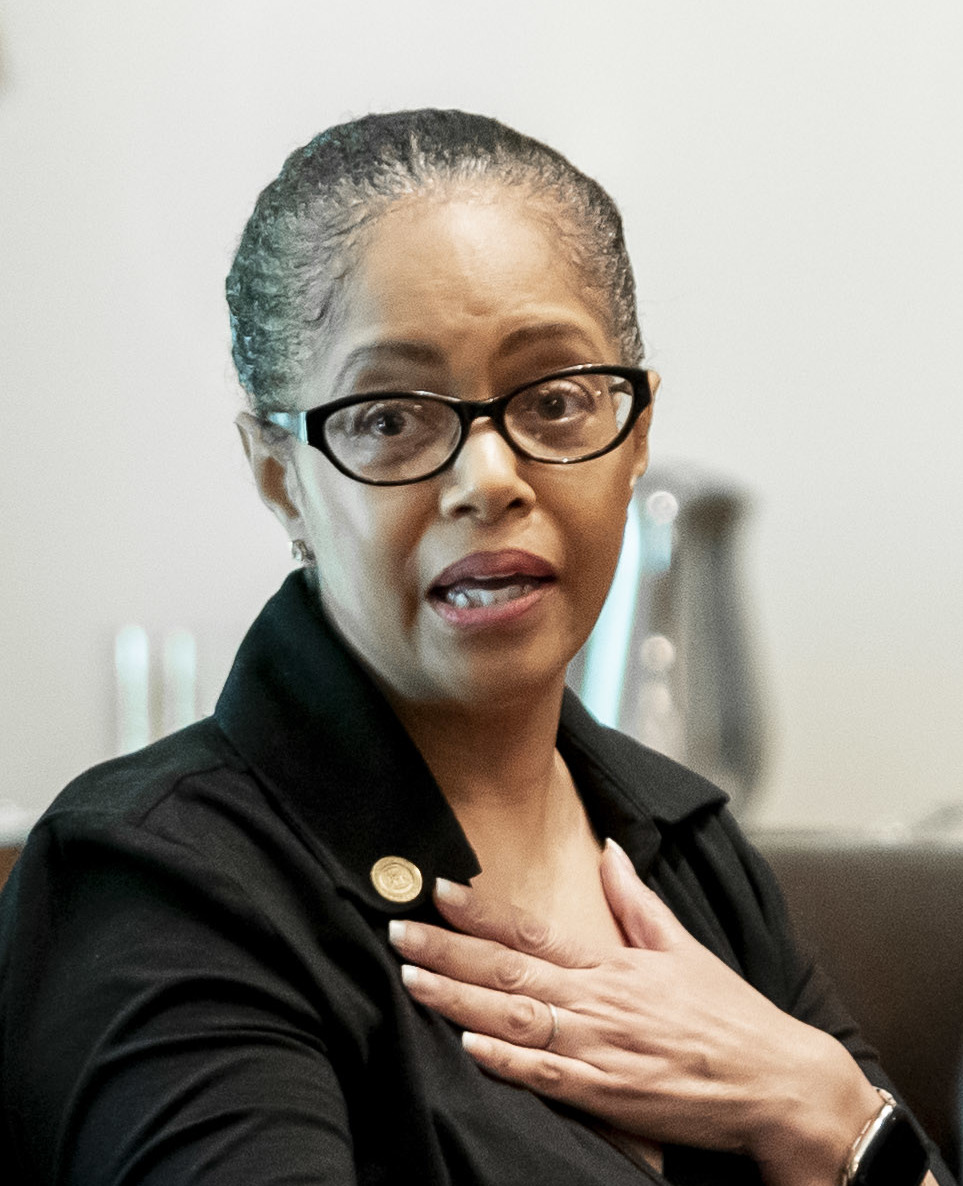
- Whitsett in 2020

Member of the Michigan House of Representatives
- Incumbent
- Assumed office January 1, 2019
- Preceded by: Sylvia Santana
- Succeeded by: Regina Ross (elect)
- Constituency: 9th district (2019–2023); 4th district (2023–present)

Personal details
- Born: November 8, 1967 (age 59) Detroit, Michigan, U.S.
- Party: Democratic (before March 2026)
- Other political affiliations: State House Democratic; Caucus (2023–2025)
- Spouse: Jason

Karen Whitsett (born November 8, 1967) is an American politician serving as a member of the Michigan House of Representatives since 2019, currently representing the 4th district. A former member of the Democratic Party, Whitsett is often considered one of the more conservative Democrats in the House. In January 2025, Whitsett announced that she would not attend House Democratic caucus meetings, and in 2026 she announced that she would not seek re-election. She was an unsuccessful candidate for Detroit City Council in 2025.

== Early life ==
Whitsett was born on November 8, 1967, in Detroit, Michigan.

== Career ==
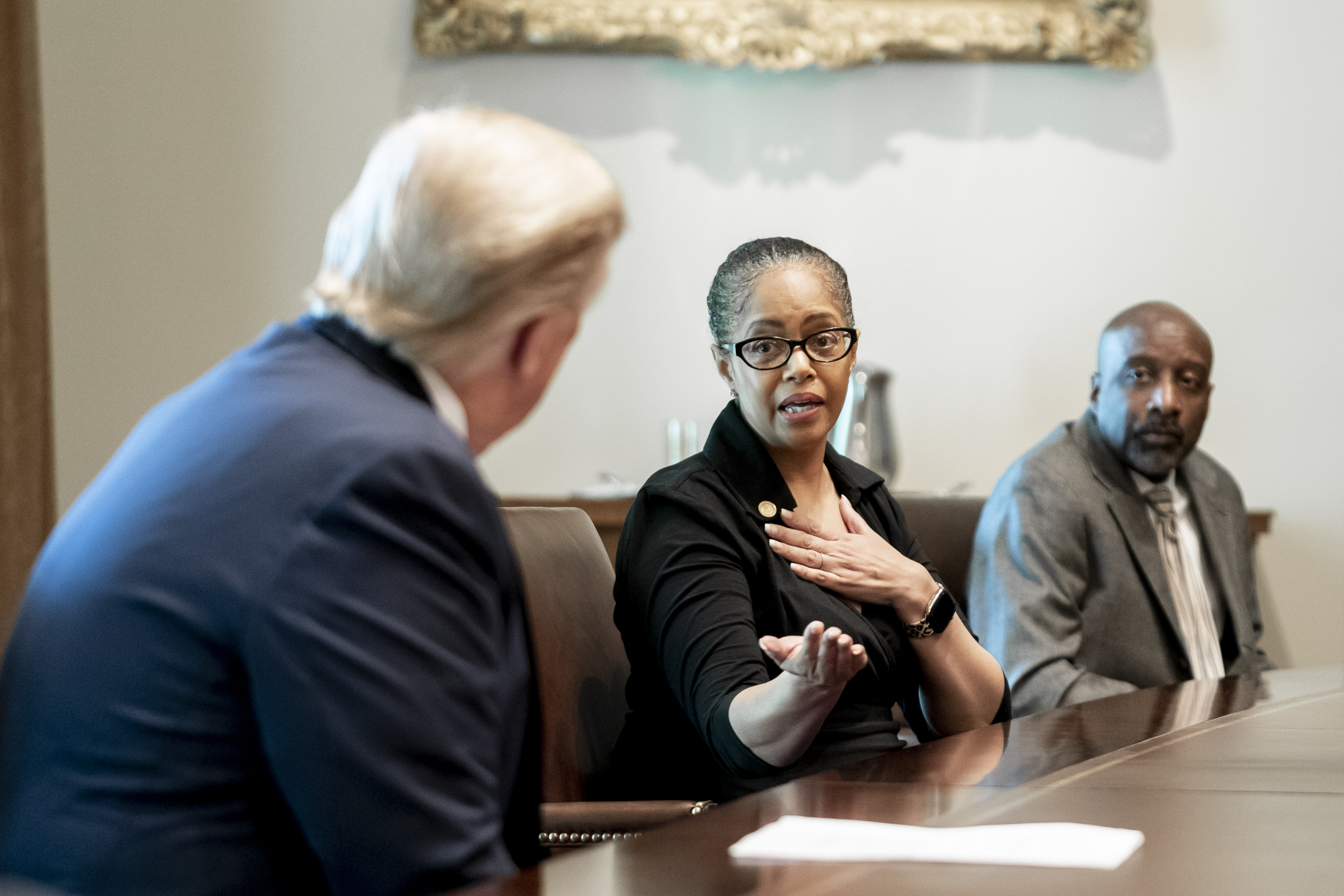
Whitsett with President Donald Trump in 2020

=== Elections ===
==== 2018 ====
On November 6, 2018, Whitsett won the election and became a Democratic member of the Michigan House of Representatives for District 9. Whitsett defeated James Stephens with 95.1% of the votes.

==== 2020 ====
Whitsett won her August 2020 primary, beating out Roslyn Ogburn, a fourth-generation Detroiter and mother of five. She then won the general election.

==== 2022 ====
On November 8, 2022, Whitsett was elected with 87% of the vote to the 4th state House district, which had changed since previous elections with redistricting.

==== 2024 ====
Whitsett was reelected without a primary or general election challenger in 2024.

==== 2025 ====
Whitsett ran for Detroit City Council District 7 in the 2025 election. She narrowly finished second in the top-two primary, behind Denzel McCampbell, and lost to McCampbell in the general election.

=== Tenure ===
Whitsett reported she was diagnosed with COVID-19 on April 6, 2020. At the same time, Whitsett credited President Donald Trump and his personal support of hydroxychloroquine and azithromycin treatments with saving her life, stating, "If President Trump had not talked about this, it would not be something that's accessible for anyone to be able to get that right now, it would not even be possible."

In May 2020, Whitsett announced she would sue Governor of Michigan Gretchen Whitmer over a censure pertaining to COVID-19, alleging that the Governor and the 13th Congressional District Democratic Party Organization were attempting to deprive her of her right to engage in protected speech after she publicly supported President Trump. In June 2020, Whitsett dropped the federal lawsuit.

In 2023, Whitsett was the sole Democrat in the Michigan House Health Policy Committee to vote against the Reproductive Health Act, an 11-bill package pertaining to abortion access. Whitsett's concerns included the use of state Medicaid funds for abortions and waiting periods between the consultation and the procedure.

In December 2024, after the entire House Republican caucus boycotted the remaining days of the legislature, Whitsett walked out of the House chamber, denying House Democrats the ability to pass several remaining bills. Whitsett returned to the capitol building but refused to enter the chamber. She cited concerns about several bills which were voted out of committee to the House floor. Speaker Joe Tate eventually adjourned the House to December 31, ending the ability of the chamber to pass any further legislation.

Whitsett announced in March 2026 that she was leaving the Democratic party. She retired at the 2026 Michigan House of Representatives election.

== Personal life ==
Whitsett's lives with her husband, Jason, and their dog, Peace. They have one child. Whitsett and her family live in Detroit. She is a practicing Christian, and credited her faith as her reason for not seeking reelection in 2026.

== See also ==
- 2018 Michigan House of Representatives election
