= Edward D. Ellis =

American politician

Member of the Michigan Senate from the 2nd district
- In office November 2, 1835 – December 31, 1837

Personal details
- Born: October 7, 1801 Niles, New York
- Died: May 15, 1848 (aged 46) Detroit, Michigan
- Party: Democratic (until 1847)
- Occupation: newspaper publisher

Edward D. Ellis (October 7, 1801 – May 15, 1848) was an American newspaper publisher and politician in the U.S. state of Michigan. He represented Monroe County in the Michigan Senate in its first two sessions.

== Biography ==
Edward Ellis was born on October 7, 1801, in Niles, New York. His father died two months before he was born, and he spent his youth on the family farm. After being put to work with a tanner, he found he disliked the work and went to Auburn, New York, to work in a printing office. Around the age of twenty, he worked for a time as a journeyman printer in Boston, and in 1825 he purchased equipment and moved west to Monroe, Michigan Territory, where he began printing the Michigan Sentinel, the first newspaper in the Michigan Territory printed outside Detroit.

Ellis gained prominence as a political writer and was an enthusiastic supporter of the Democratic Party until, in 1847, he broke with the party over its support for slavery.

He was a member of the Territorial Council and a delegate to the state constitutional convention of 1835. At the convention, a proposal was discussed to establish public libraries in every township of the state, but with no provision for funding them or purchasing books. Ellis pushed through the idea of setting aside criminal fines paid to the state to fund the libraries. In the first election for the newly-created state legislature in 1835, Ellis was elected to represent Monroe County in the Michigan Senate, and was re-elected for a second term.

He sold his newspaper and moved to Detroit around 1842, where he began publishing the American Vineyard newspaper. He is credited with being the first newspaper publisher to advocate for the nomination of General Zachary Taylor for president, for which Taylor sent him a note of thanks. Ellis died suddenly in Detroit, on May 15, 1848, shortly before the start of the convention that nominated Taylor, perhaps because of internal injuries sustained while fighting a fire a couple days previously.

Ellis had a reputation for integrity, and Michigan Governor William Woodbridge said, "I know of no man more purely honest than he."

=== Family ===
Ellis married Leonora Mary Chapman, originally of Buffalo, New York, in Detroit on February 2, 1830. Prior to marriage, Chapman had been a teacher in Kentucky. They had six children: Mary Minerva, Amelia, E. Charles, John C. C., Elizabeth T., and Benjamin F. After Ellis's death in 1848, she lived in Chicago and Detroit, and died in Detroit, the home of her eldest child Mary Minerva, on August 26, 1870.
