= Bill LaVoy =

American politician from Michigan

Bill Lavoy

Member of the Michigan House of Representatives from the 17th district
- In office January 1, 2013 – December 31, 2016
- Preceded by: Phil Cavanagh
- Succeeded by: Joe Bellino

Personal details
- Born: November 26, 1967 (age 58)
- Party: Democratic
- Spouse: Michelle
- Education: University of Michigan
- Occupation: Politician

Bill LaVoy is a Democratic former member of the Michigan House of Representatives. Prior to serving in the House, LaVoy worked as the executive director of Monroe Public Access Cable Television.

He was first elected in 2012, was reelected in 2014, before losing his bid for a third term in 2016.

In 2018 he challenged incumbent State Senator Dale Zorn in the 17th district, losing by 58% to 39%. At the same time his wife Michelle LaVoy faced Joe Bellino for his old house seat but she was also unsuccessful.

In 2013, LaVoy proposed a successful resolution that declared October 4 French-Canadian Heritage Day.

Party political offices
Preceded by Phil Cavanagh	Member of the Michigan House of Representatives for the 17th district 2013–2016	Succeeded by Joe Bellino
