= Michigan's 4th House of Representatives district =

American legislative district

Michigan's 4th State House of Representatives district
Representative
Karen Whitsett; D–Detroit
- Demographics: 5.3% White; 86.6% Black; 4.1% Hispanic; 0.1% Asian; 0.1% Native American; 0.3% Other; 3.6% Multiracial
- Population (2024): 89,014

Michigan's 4th House of Representatives district is a legislative district within the Michigan House of Representatives located in Wayne County. The district was created in 1965, when the Michigan Supreme Court ordered the reapportionment of state legislative districts from a county-based system to a proportional one following the Supreme Court case Reynolds v. Sims. It is currently represented by Democrat Karen Whitsett of Detroit.

== List of representatives ==
Representative	Party	Years	Residence	Notes
William B. Fitzgerald	Democratic	1965–1970	Detroit	Died December 1970.
William B. Fitzgerald Jr.	Democratic	1971 (Note: Elected in a 1971 special election to replace his father, Rep. William B. Fitzgerald, who died.)–1972	Detroit	Redistricted to the 12th district.
Alma Grace Stallworth	Democratic	1973–1974	Detroit	Redistricted from the 15th district.
George Cushingberry Jr.	Democratic	1975–1982	Detroit	
Alma Grace Stallworth	Democratic	1983–1992	Detroit	Redistricted to the 12th district.
Joseph F. Young Jr.	Democratic	1993–1994	Detroit	Redistricted from the 15th district.
Edward Vaughn	Democratic	1995–2000	Detroit	Previously served in the 8th district; term limited.
Mary D. Waters	Democratic	2001–2006	Detroit	Term limited.
Coleman A. Young II	Democratic	2007–2010	Detroit	
Maureen Stapleton	Democratic	2011–2012	Detroit	
Rose Mary Robinson	Democratic	2013–2018	Detroit	Term limited.
Isaac Robinson	Democratic	2019–2020	Detroit	Died March 2020.
Abraham Aiyash	Democratic	2020 (Note: Elected in a 2020 special election to replace Rep. Isaac Robinson, who died.)–2022	Hamtramck	Redistricted to the 9th district.
Karen S. Whitsett	Democratic	2023–present	Detroit	Redistricted from the 9th district; elected as a Democrat but left the caucus in January 2025 and claimed to have left the party altogether in March 2026.
Regina Ross	Democratic	(Note: Member-elect.)	Detroit	

== Historical district boundaries ==
Map	Description	Apportionment Plan	Notes
	Wayne County (part): Detroit (part)	1964 Apportionment Plan (Note: Referred to as the Austin-Kleiner plan.)	
	Wayne County (part): Detroit (part)	1972 Apportionment Plan (Note: Referred to as the Hatcher-Kleiner plan.)	
	Wayne County (part): Detroit (part)	1982 Apportionment Plan	
	Wayne County (part): Detroit (part; much of the Lower East Side and Upper East Side and part of Midtown)	1992 Apportionment Plan	
	Wayne County (part): Detroit (part; much of the Lower East Side and parts of Downtown and Midtown)	2001 Apportionment Plan	
	Wayne County (part): Detroit (part; Midtown and New Center); Hamtramck	2011 Apportionment Plan	
	Wayne County (part): Dearborn (part); Detroit (part)	2021 Apportionment Plan (Note: Referred to as the Hickory plan.)	
	Wayne County (part): Detroit (part)	Remedial 2021 Apportionment Plan Approved in 2024 (Note: Referred to as the Motown Sound FC E1 plan.)	

== Recent elections ==
=== 2020s ===
2026 Michigan House of Representatives election
Party	Candidate	Votes	%
Democratic	Regina Ross	27,130	96.18
Republican	Everett Davis	1,077	3.82
Total votes		28,207	100
Democratic hold			

2024 Michigan House of Representatives election
Party	Candidate	Votes	%
Democratic	Karen Whitsett (incumbent)	33,026	100
Total votes		33,026	100
Democratic hold			

2022 Michigan House of Representatives election
Party	Candidate	Votes	%
Democratic	Karen Whitsett	16,990	87.08
Republican	Tonya Renay Wells	2,520	12.92
Total votes		19,510	100
Democratic hold			

2020 Michigan House of Representatives election
Party	Candidate	Votes	%
Democratic	Abraham Aiyash (incumbent)	27,263	89.75
Republican	Howard Weathington	1,736	5.71
Working Class	Linda Rayburn	1,023	3.37
Independent	Md Rabbi Alam	355	1.17
Total votes		30,377	100
Democratic hold			

2020 Michigan House of Representatives 4th district special election
Party	Candidate	Votes	%
Democratic	Abraham Aiyash	28,379	100
Total votes		28,379	100
Democratic hold			

=== 2010s ===
2018 Michigan House of Representatives election
Party	Candidate	Votes	%
Democratic	Isaac Robinson	20,209	94.58
Republican	Howard Weathington	1,159	5.42
Total votes		21,368	100
Democratic hold			

2016 Michigan House of Representatives election
Party	Candidate	Votes	%
Democratic	Rose Mary C. Robinson (incumbent)	24,790	91.87
Republican	Matt Schonert	1,397	5.18
Green	Dan Finn	796	2.95
Total votes		26,983	100
Democratic hold			

2014 Michigan House of Representatives election
Party	Candidate	Votes	%
Democratic	Rose Mary C. Robinson (incumbent)	15,609	94.57
Republican	Edith Floyd	896	5.43
Total votes		16,505	100
Democratic hold			

2012 Michigan House of Representatives election
Party	Candidate	Votes	%
Democratic	Rose Mary C. Robinson	27,512	95.3
Republican	Ron Michalski	1,356	4.7
Total votes		28,868	100
Democratic hold			

2010 Michigan House of Representatives election
Party	Candidate	Votes	%
Democratic	Maureen L. Stapleton	15,561	94.89
Republican	Lillian L. Smith	547	3.34
Independent	Danetta L. Simpson	291	1.77
Total votes		16,399	100
Democratic hold			

=== 2000s ===
2008 Michigan House of Representatives election
Party	Candidate	Votes	%
Democratic	Coleman A. Young (incumbent)	28,114	100.00
Total votes		28,114	100
Democratic hold			

2006 Michigan House of Representatives election
Party	Candidate	Votes	%
Democratic	Coleman A. Young	18,841	93.9
Republican	Scott Withington	1,223	6.1
Total votes		20,064	100
Democratic hold			

2004 Michigan House of Representatives election
Party	Candidate	Votes	%
Democratic	Mary D. Waters (incumbent)	27,873	96.06
Republican	Carla Haska	1,143	3.94
Total votes		29,016	100
Democratic hold			

2002 Michigan House of Representatives election
Party	Candidate	Votes	%
Democratic	Mary D. Waters (incumbent)	19,337	96.18
Republican	Wayne A. Senior	767	3.82
Total votes		20,104	100
Democratic hold			

2000 Michigan House of Representatives election
Party	Candidate	Votes	%
Democratic	Mary D. Waters	18,831	96.29
Republican	Robert Bruner	726	3.71
Total votes		19,557	100
Democratic hold			

=== 1990s ===
1998 Michigan House of Representatives election
Party	Candidate	Votes	%
Democratic	Ed Vaughn (incumbent)	15,239	95.84
Republican	Cynthia Billings	662	4.16
Total votes		15,901	100
Democratic hold			
