= Henry B. Lathrop =

American politician

Henry B. Lathrop (1808 - 1890) was a mason and mine superintendent who served in the Michigan Senate.

He represented Jackson County in the Michigan House of Representatives in 1840. He represented the 2nd district in the Michigan Senate in 1847. He was a Whig.
