= Bishop School (Detroit) =

Coordinates: 42.3454°N 83.0431°W

Information
- Established: 1858

Bishop School, also known as the Bishop Union School and Old Bishop School, was a public school in Detroit. Students included African Americans and members of The Purple Gang, a predominantly Russian Jewish criminal gang.

== History ==
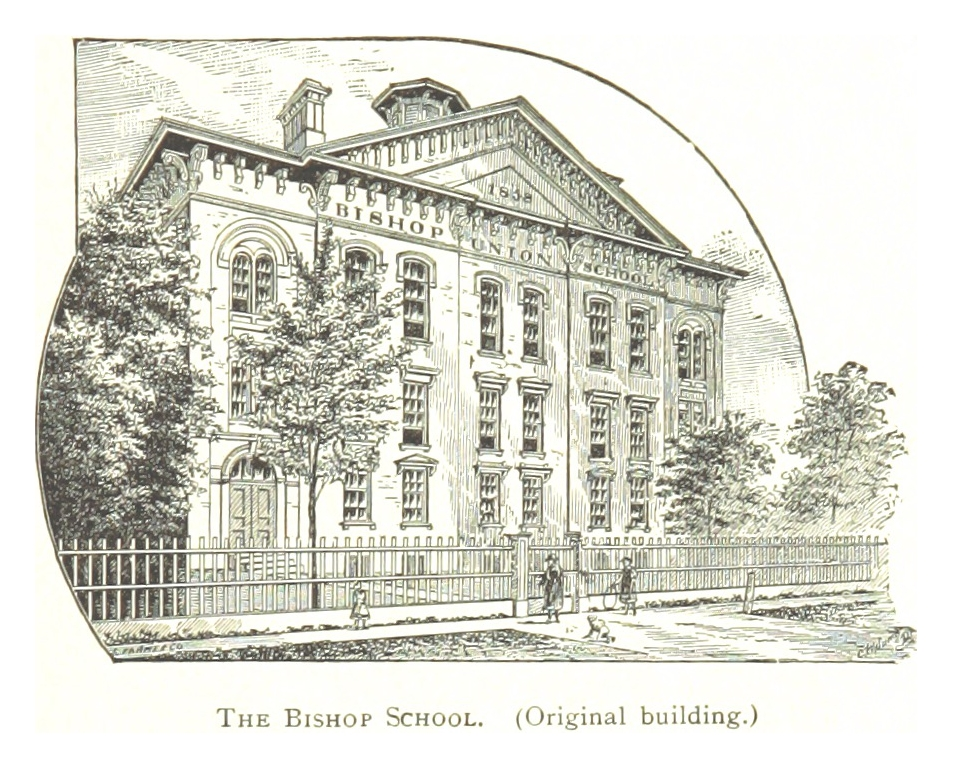
The original Bishop School building

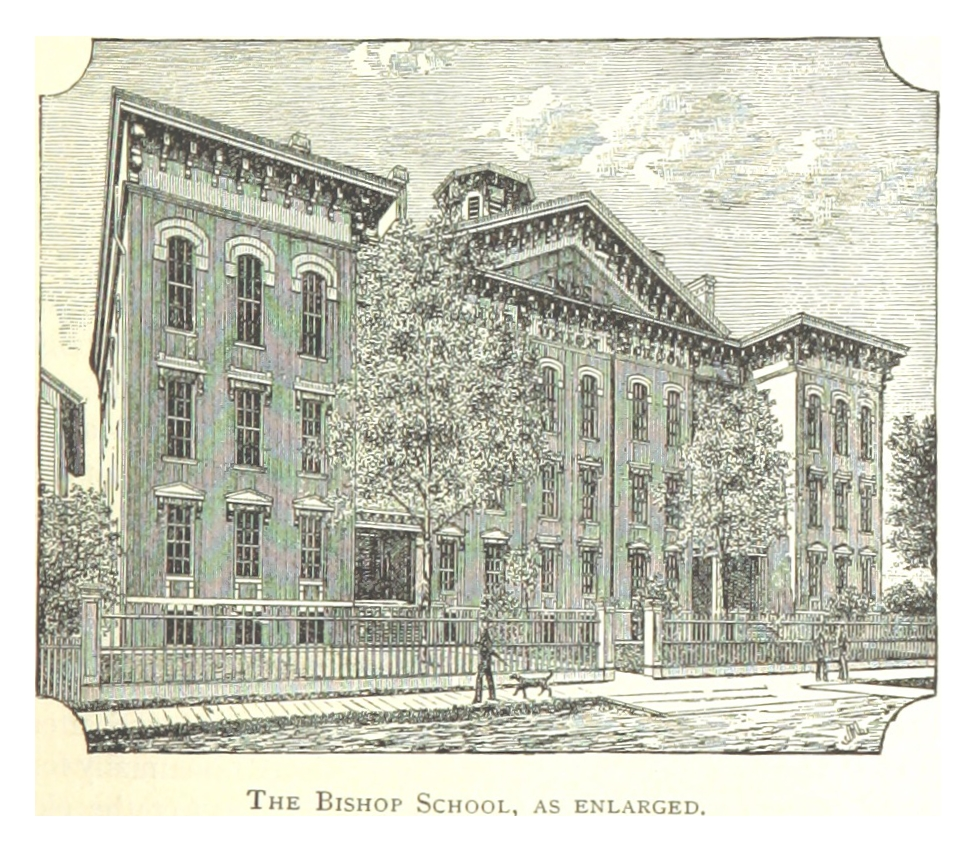
The school building after the addition of two wings

Levi Bishop, the president of the Detroit Board of Education, saw a need to create a new union school as opposed to a high school. Though there was disagreement within the Board of Education, Bishop Union School was established in July 1858 and named after Levi Bishop. It was the third union school built by the Detroit Board of Education, and it served kindergarten to 8th grade and had a pool, baths, a clinic, a dental clinic, and a "Foreign Room".

In 1894 the school was described as having a great variety of nationalities. A 1914 report described the school as serving mostly Jewish students and stated that much of their education was done at the library with students "completing their education in a year and a half." Other Detroit schools served mostly Italian or Polish students. The school was one of those selected for a program to "Americanize" Jewish community members and teach them English as well as assist them with naturalization papers.

== Notable people ==
Cora Brown, the first African American woman elected state senator in the United States, attended Bishop School. The Kaufmanns, businessmen in Detroit, attended the school.

== In popular culture ==
Yusef Lateef recorded the song Bishop School on his 1969 Atlantic Records album Yusef Lateef's Detroit.
