= Sylvia Santana =

American politician (born 1979)

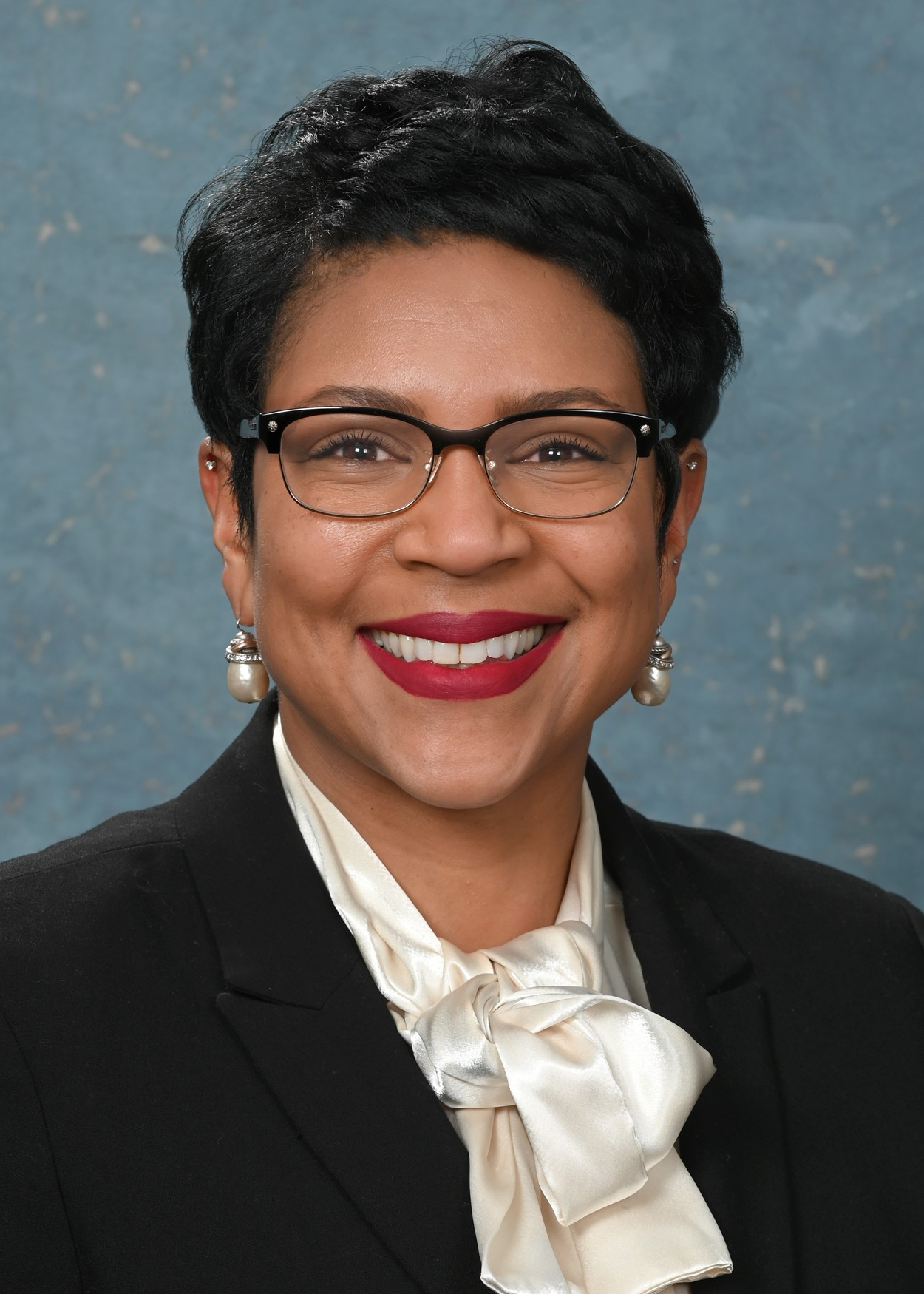

Member of the Michigan Senate
- Incumbent
- Assumed office January 1, 2019
- Preceded by: Morris Hood III
- Constituency: 3rd district (2019–2023); 2nd district (2023–present)

Member of the Michigan House of Representatives from the 9th district
- In office January 1, 2017 – December 31, 2018
- Preceded by: Harvey Santana
- Succeeded by: Karen Whitsett

Personal details
- Born: November 23, 1979 (age 46) Cincinnati, Ohio, U.S.
- Party: Democratic
- Spouse: Harvey Santana (m. 2003)
- Children: 3
- Education: Eastern Michigan University (BS); Michigan State University (MBA)
- Website: State Senate website Campaign website

Sylvia Anjel Santana (born November 23, 1979) is an American politician and a Democratic member of the Michigan Senate, representing the 2nd district. She previously represented the 3rd district from 2019 to 2022. She also served in the Michigan House of Representatives from the 9th district from 2017 to 2019.

== Early life and education ==
Santana was born in Cincinnati, Ohio. She attended Eastern Michigan University, where she was a member of the Finance Club, majored in finance, and graduated with a bachelor's degree in business in 2007. In 2022 she received her master's degree in business administration from Michigan State University.

== Early career ==
Before her tenure in the Michigan legislature, Santana spent over 15 years working in finance, for companies like ProsperUS Detroit/Southwest Economic Solutions, Sandler & Travis Trade Advisory Services, Inc., and Quicken Loans.

== State legislature ==
=== House of Representatives ===
Santana served one term in the Michigan House of Representatives, representing the 9th district, which at the time included Detroit and Dearborn. In this role, she was a member of the CARES Task Force, which studies mental health issues in the state. She was also on State House committees for the Department of Health and Human Services, Licensing and Regulatory Affairs, and Corrections.

=== Senate ===
Santana is currently serving her second term in the Michigan Senate, after first being elected in 2018. She was named the MIRS News Democratic Legislator of the Year in 2020. In 2026, the Detroit News reported on 19 taxpayer-funded trips Santana took between 2021 and June 30, 2026, including the National Organization of Black Elected Legislative Women Annual Legislative Conference, the Council of State Governments National Conference, and National Organization of Black Elected Legislative Women Conference.

== Personal life ==
Santana married fellow Michigan legislator Harvey Santana in 2003, after meeting her freshman year of college at Eastern Michigan University. They live in Warrendale with their three children: Sofia, Olivia, and Samuel. She is Catholic.

Santana has been involved in a number of community projects and groups, including the creation of the neighborhood block club and as the finance director and later president of the Warrendale Community Organization.
