= Rose Mary Robinson =

American politician (born 1939)

Member of the Michigan House of Representatives from the 4th district
- In office January 1, 2013 – December 31, 2018
- Preceded by: Maureen Stapleton
- Succeeded by: Isaac Robinson

Personal details
- Born: December 12, 1939 (age 86)
- Party: Democratic
- Children: 6, including Isaac
- Education: Wayne State Law School (JD)

Rose Mary Robinson (born December 12, 1939) is an American lawyer and a former Democratic member of the Michigan House of Representatives.

== Early life and education ==
Rose Mary Robinson was born on December 12, 1939. In 1972, Robinson earned a Juris Doctor degree from Wayne State Law School in Detroit, Michigan.

== Career ==
Robinson started her legal career as a Legal Council for American Federation of State, County, and Municipal Employees for Council 25. In 1970, with the help from John Dingell, Robinson was one of the first women elected as a County Commissioner in Wayne County, Michigan. Robinson served as the County Commissioner until 1982. In 2006, 2008, and 2010, Robinson was a delegate for the Democratic Precinct.

On November 6, 2012, Robinson won the election and became a member of the Michigan House of Representatives for District 4 and won reelection two more times being term limits prevented her from seeking another. In February 2015, Robinson cosponsored HB 4209, a bill that establishes regulations for medical marijuana facilities. In September 2017, Robinson cosponsored HB 4991, a bill that appropriates $1.3 billion for fiscal year 2019. Due to term limits, Robinson did not campaign in the 2018 election.

Political offices
Preceded by Maureen Stapleton	Michigan Representatives 4th District; 2013-2018	Succeeded by Isaac Robinson
