= Donavan McKinney =

American politician (born 1992)

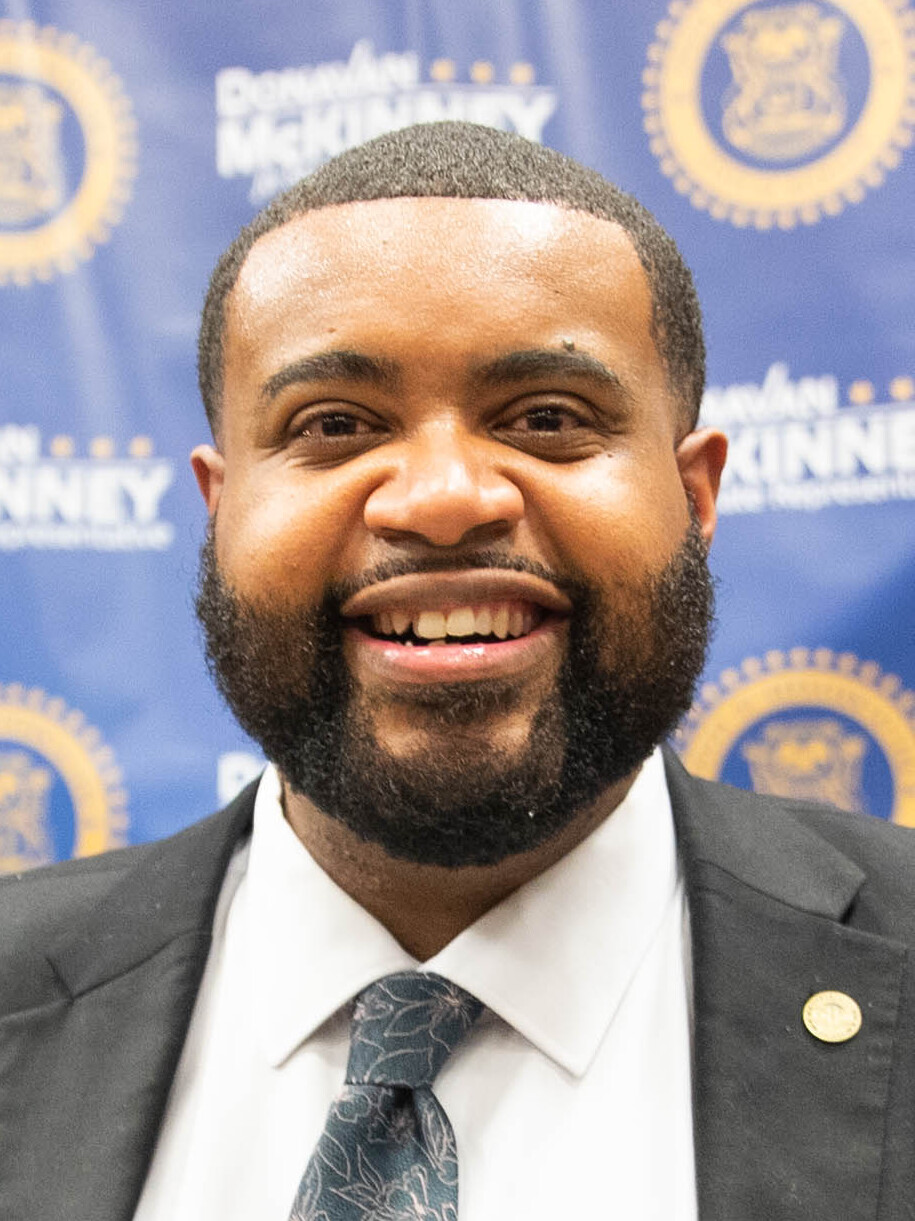
- McKinney in 2022

Member-elect of the U.S. House of Representatives from Michigan's 13th district
- Assuming office January 3, 2027
- Succeeding: Shri Thanedar

Member of the Michigan House of Representatives
- Incumbent
- Assumed office January 1, 2023
- Preceded by: Cara Clemente
- Succeeded by: Kimberly Fisher (elect)
- Constituency: 14th district (2023–2025); 11th district (2025–present)

Personal details
- Born: Donovan Deante McKinney; June 16, 1992 (age 34) Detroit, Michigan, U.S.
- Party: Democratic
- Other political affiliations: Democratic Socialists of America
- Spouse: Shaunté Wilcher
- Children: 3
- Education: University of Michigan (BA)

Donavan Deante McKinney (born June 16, 1992) is an American politician serving as a member of the Michigan House of Representatives since 2023, currently representing the 11th district. A member of the Democratic Party and the Democratic Socialists of America, McKinney is the member-elect for Michigan's 13th congressional district in 2026.

== Early life ==
McKinney was born and raised on the northeast side of Detroit near Seven Mile Road and Van Dyke Avenue and attended Renaissance High School. He relied on public transportation to get to school, spending five hours every day on the bus. He was mostly raised by his grandmother while his mother worked. His family moved 13 times while he was growing up, mostly due to evictions.

McKinney earned a bachelor's degree in public policy from the University of Michigan in 2014.

== Early career ==
McKinney worked as a legislative director in the Michigan Legislature, and then later in community engagement for the nonprofit Community Development Advocates of Detroit, before becoming an organizer for healthcare in the Michigan Service Employees International Union. In 2020, Governor Gretchen Whitmer appointed him to her Environmental Justice Council where he helped develop the pandemic plan to restore sewage service and water to Detroit residents via the $2 million Water Restart Grant Program and her statewide Water Reconnection Executive Order.

== Political career ==
=== Michigan House of Representatives ===
McKinney was elected to the Michigan House of Representatives from the 14th district in the 2022 election.

Following court-mandated redistricting of the Detroit area, McKinney ran in the 11th district for the 2024 election, winning re-election.

McKinney has been critical of Michigan's utility companies, and of corporate influence in politics in general. He co-sponsored a bipartisan bill package that would prohibit political campaign contributions from utility companies, such as DTE Energy and Consumers Energy, as well as from major state government contractors, such as Blue Cross Blue Shield. McKinney also supports an increase to the credit that Michigan energy companies must pay to consumers affected by prolonged power outages, arguing that the current rate of $35 per day is not enough to offset the costs of spoiled medicine or groceries.

McKinney was one of two primary sponsors on legislation in 2023 that would create the position of medication aide in nursing homes to fill the gap between entry-level nursing assistants and licensed practical nurses and help address severe staff shortages by freeing up licensed practical and registered nurses to do more patient care. Governor Whitmer signed the bipartisan bill into law.

In November 2023, McKinney joined two dozen other lawmakers, including State House Majority Leader Abraham Aiyash, in sending a letter to President Joe Biden to urge him to advance "a lasting ceasefire" in the Gaza war. The letter urged "the immediate and unconditional release of all hostages, the adherence of all international laws, and aid to ensure that every person living in Israel, Gaza, and the West Bank can live with self-determination, dignity and humanity."

In 2024, McKinney introduced legislation that would protect the privacy of individuals who filed complaints of misconduct against police officers. He also introduced legislation that would require separation records to include any disciplinary actions or investigations against an officer, and to require the Michigan Commission on Law Enforcement Standards to revoke an officer's license if they use excessive force that results in the death or serious bodily injury of another individual. Neither of these bills became law.

Major successes in the district include helping to win over $10 million in community violence intervention programs, which led to the creation of the statewide community violence intervention initiative to focus on preventing gun violence. McKinney also won $600 million in federal funds to replace lead pipes in Detroit and surrounding suburbs.

=== 2026 congressional campaign ===
In April 2025, McKinney announced his candidacy for Michigan's 13th congressional district in the 2026 election, challenging incumbent Shri Thanedar. He is endorsed by U.S. Rep. Rashida Tlaib, former U.S. Rep. Brenda Lawrence, the Justice Democrats, Senator Bernie Sanders, the Working Families Party, the Metro Detroit chapter of the Democratic Socialists of America, more than a dozen state legislators, and the Michigan chapter of Service Employees International Union, of which McKinney is a former member and organizer.

McKinney has said his campaign will focus on lowering costs, especially car insurance and child care. He would like to abolish ICE. He stated "There's like .0001%, like very small percentage of folks, poor people, take advantage of the system,"

On August 4, McKinney defeated Thanedar.

== Personal life ==
McKinney and his wife Shaunté Wilcher, an attorney, have three children. The oldest was born in 2022 and the youngest in 2025. He has said that even with his statehouse salary that is twice the median income in his district, he and his wife can still only afford to put their oldest child into childcare. McKinney developed asthma as a child.

== Electoral history ==
=== 2016 ===
2016 Michigan House of Representatives election, District 3
Primary election
Party	Candidate	Votes	%
Democratic	Wendell Byrd (Incumbent)	3,129	45.38
Democratic	Al Williams	1,283	18.61
Democratic	Donavan McKinney	1,060	15.37
Democratic	April Bonner-Archer	754	10.94
Democratic	Burgess Foster	357	5.18
Democratic	Damian Mitchell	172	2.49
Democratic	Lee Qualls	140	2.03
Total votes		6,895	100.0

=== 2020 ===
2020 Michigan House of Representatives election, District 3
Primary election
Party	Candidate	Votes	%
Democratic	Shri Thanedar	4,745	34.9
Democratic	Donavan McKinney	2,774	20.4
Democratic	China Cochran	2,276	16.7
Democratic	Al Williams	2,222	16.3
Democratic	John Cromer	520	3.8
Democratic	Art Tyus	468	3.4
Democratic	Keith McMurtry	467	3.4
Democratic	Steven Lett	120	0.9
Total votes		13,592	100.0

=== 2022 ===
2022 Michigan House of Representatives election, District 14
Primary election
Party	Candidate	Votes	%
Democratic	Donavan McKinney	4,452	59.3
Democratic	Kristina Lodovisi	2,129	28.4
Democratic	Aaron Delikta	923	12.3
Total votes		7,504	100.0
General election
Democratic	Donavan McKinney	18,968	71.3
Republican	Wendy Watters	7,174	27.0
Green	N. Jefferey Sparling	444	1.7
Total votes		26,586	100.0
Democratic hold			

=== 2024 ===
2022 Michigan House of Representatives election, District 11
Primary election
Party	Candidate	Votes	%
Democratic	Donavan McKinney (incumbent)	7,145	100.0
Total votes		7,145	100.0
General election
Democratic	Donavan McKinney (incumbent)	28,031	82.3
Republican	Dale Walker	6,025	17.7
Total votes		34,056	100.0
Democratic hold			

=== 2026 ===
2026 Michigan's 13th congressional district election
Primary election
Party	Candidate	Votes	%
Democratic	Donavan McKinney	57,746	51.9
Democratic	Shri Thanedar (incumbent)	53,522	48.1
Total votes		111,268	100.0

U.S. House of Representatives
Preceded by Shri Thanedar	Member of the U.S. House of Representatives from Michigan's 13th congressional district Taking office 2027	Elect
