= Alberta Tinsley-Talabi =

American politician (born 1954)

Member of the Michigan House of Representatives from the 2nd district
- In office January 1, 2013 – December 31, 2016
- Preceded by: Lisa Howze
- Succeeded by: Bettie Cook Scott

Member of the Michigan House of Representatives from the 3rd district
- In office January 1, 2011 – December 31, 2012
- Preceded by: Bettie Cook Scott
- Succeeded by: John Olumba

Personal details
- Born: August 14, 1954 (age 72) Detroit, Michigan
- Party: Democratic
- Spouse: Bamidele
- Children: Carla
- Occupation: Social worker, politician

Alberta Tinsley-Talabi (born August 14, 1954) served three terms in the Michigan House of Representatives representing District 2, which includes the cities of Grosse Pointe, Grosse Pointe Farms, Grosse Pointe Park and a portion of Detroit. She was a member of the Detroit City Council from 1993 to 2009 and served as a Wayne County Commissioner from 1987 to 1990.

Tinsley-Talabi was first elected to the State House in 2010 to the 3rd District and re-elected in 2012 to the 2nd District following redistricting.

She has received over 100 National and Local awards received for leadership in the area of Substance Abuse Prevention and Community Service including: United States Office of Drug Czar Presidential Award, National Council on Alcoholism Detroit and Vicinity 2 time award recipient, Scenic America National Award for Beautification State of Michigan House Resolution, and Partnership For a Drug Free Detroit Leadership Award 2 time recipient.
