= Ogonowski =

Ogonowski (feminine: Ogonowska) is a surname. Notable people with the surname include:

- Casmer P. Ogonowski (1923–2012), American politician
- John Ogonowski (1951–2001), American pilot and agricultural activist
