= Mike McFall =

American politician (born 1974)

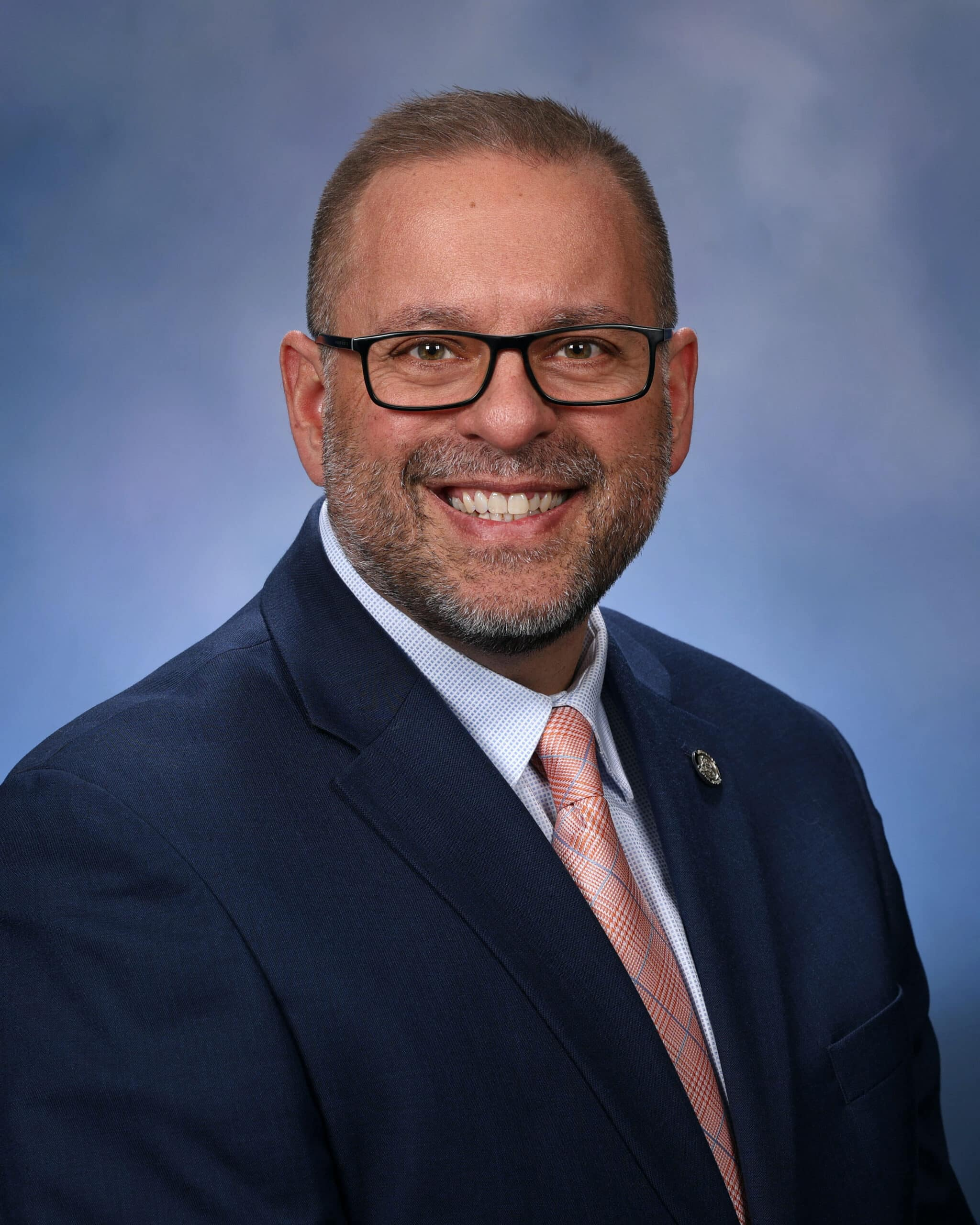

Member of the Michigan House of Representatives
- Incumbent
- Assumed office January 1, 2023
- Preceded by: Regina Weiss (Note: Before the 2021 redistricting cycle, the 8th district was split among parts of five state house districts. Their representatives were, from North to South, Jim Ellison (D-Royal Oak), Regina Weiss (D-Oak Park), Shri Thanedar (D-Detroit), Helena Scott (D-Detroit), and Abraham Aiyash (D-Hamtramck).)
- Constituency: 8th district (2023–2025); 14th district (2025–present)

Personal details
- Born: Mike Carl McFall; March 4, 1974 (age 52) Burton, Michigan, U.S.
- Party: Democratic
- Education: Central Michigan University (BS)
- Website: House website Campaign website

Mike McFall (born March 4, 1974) is an American politician serving as a member of the Michigan House of Representatives since 2023, currently representing the 14th district. He is a member of the Democratic Party.

== Early life and education ==
Mike McFall was born on March 4, 1974, and grew up in Burton, Michigan, a suburb of Flint. Growing up his father worked for General Motors and was a member of UAW while his mother worked at a local elementary school.

McFall graduated from Central Michigan University with a bachelor of science in community development and public administration. He worked in the nonprofit sector and as a Membership Services and Philanthropy Associate for the Williams Syndrome Association before being elected.

== Political career ==
=== Local office ===
In 2017, McFall and his husband moved to Hazel Park, where he quickly became part of the local community, joining local community boards and becoming elected to the city council in 2019. As a member of the city council and the downtown development authority he launched the Downtown Hazel Park Initiative, designed to rejuvenate the downtown and attract business from wealthier, surrounding communities. He would also be elected Mayor Pro Tempore of the city.

=== State legislature ===
In February 2022 McFall announced his candidacy for the Michigan House of Representatives, filing to run in the newly drawn 8th district, declaring his priorities to be supporting skilled trades, fixing municipal finance, and supporting mental health. He also made clear the importance of LGBTQ representation in Lansing, and the need to expand the Elliott-Larsen Civil Rights Act.

After winning the primary he was elected by a landslide in the general election on November 8, 2022.

Following court-mandated redistricting of the Detroit area, McFall ran in the 14th district for the 2024 election, winning reelection.

McFall was the primary sponsor and passed HB 4194 (2023) which would allow returning citizens to receive a state ID upon release, PA 275 of 2024 which would require the Michigan Department of Health and Human Services to apply for the federal Ground Emergency Medical Transport program, and PA 149 of 2024 which expands disabled license plate qualification to disabled veterans who are at least 50% disabled based on the Department of Veteran's Affairs qualifications.

McFall's political focuses include mental healthcare, local government, civil rights, public education, economic and small business development, and environmental preservation and justice. In 2024, McFall attended the Bowhay Institute for Legislative Leadership Development (BILLD) which focuses on developing legislators as leaders in their community.

== Personal life ==
McFall is openly gay, and made history as part of the largest LGBTQ+ legislative cohort in Michigan. He lives in Hazel Park with his husband and pets, two dogs and one cat.

== Electoral history ==
2022 General Election, Michigan House of Representatives - 8th District
| Party | Candidate | Votes | % |
|---|---|---|---|
| Democratic | Mike McFall | 23,364 | 78.88 |
| Republican | Robert Noble | 6,254 | 21.12 |
| Total votes | | 29,618 | 100% |
| Democratic hold | | | |

2022 Democratic Primary, Michigan House of Representatives - 8th District
| Party | Candidate | Votes | % |
|---|---|---|---|
| Democratic | Mike McFall | 3,617 | 37.79 |
| Democratic | Durrel Douglas | 2,071 | 21.64 |
| Democratic | Ernest Little | 1,643 | 17.16 |
| Democratic | David Solits | 1,337 | 13.97 |
| Democratic | Ryan Nelson | 904 | 9.44 |
| Total votes | | 9,572 | 100% |

2024 Michigan's 14th House of Representatives district election
| Party | Candidate | Votes | % |
|---|---|---|---|
| Democratic | Mike McFall (incumbent) | 26,669 | 59.06% |
| Republican | Barbara Barber | 18,489 | 40.94% |
| Total votes | | 45,158 | 100.0 |

2024 Democratic Primary, Michigan House of Representatives - 14th District
| Party | Candidate | Votes | % |
|---|---|---|---|
| Democratic | Mike McFall | 6,493 | 71.10 |
| Democratic | James R. Fouts | 2,639 | 28.90 |
| Total votes | | 9,132 | 100% |
