= Howze =

Howze is a surname. Notable people with the surname include:

- Hamilton H. Howze (1908–1998), American general, son of Robert
- Joseph Lawson Howze (1923–2019), American Roman Catholic bishop
- Lisa Howze (born 1973), American politician
- Robert Lee Howze (1864–1926), American general
