= Michigan's 2nd House of Representatives district =

American legislative district

Michigan's 2nd State House of Representatives district
Representative
Tullio Liberati; D–Allen Park
- Demographics: 64% White; 9.2% Black; 20.2% Hispanic; 1.1% Asian; 0.1% Native American; 0.3% Hawaiian/Pacific Islander; 0.5% Other; 4.6% Multiracial
- Population (2024): 90,600

Michigan's 2nd House of Representatives district is a legislative district within the Michigan House of Representatives located in Wayne County. The district was created in 1965, when the Michigan Supreme Court ordered the reapportionment of state legislative districts from a county-based system to a proportional one following the Supreme Court case Reynolds v. Sims. It is currently represented by Democrat Tullio Liberati of Allen Park.

== List of representatives ==
Representative	Party	Years	Residence	Notes
Walter J. Hyso	Democratic		Hamtramck	Reapportioned from the former Wayne County, 14th district; died after being elected to this district, but before being sworn in.
James H. Karoub	Democratic	1965 (Note: Elected in a 1965 special election to fill a vacancy created by the death of Rep. Walter J. Hyso.)–1968	Highland Park	Previously served in the former Wayne County, 15th district.
Ted Mrozowski	Democratic	1969–1972	Hamtramck	
William M. Brodhead	Democratic	1973–1974	Detroit	Redistricted from the 17th district.
Jack Legel	Democratic	1975–1980	Detroit	
Burton Leland	Democratic	1981–1992	Detroit	Redistricted to the 13th district.
Curtis Hertel Sr.	Democratic	1993–1998	Detroit	Redistricted from the 12th district; term limited.
LaMar Lemmons III	Democratic	1999–2002	Detroit	
Kenneth R. Daniels	Democratic	2003–2004	Detroit	Redistricted from the 5th district; term limited.
LaMar Lemmons Jr.	Democratic	2005–2010	Detroit	Term limited.
Lisa Howze	Democratic	2011–2012	Detroit	
Alberta Tinsley Talabi	Democratic	2013–2016	Detroit	Redistricted from the 3rd district; term limited.
Bettie Cook Scott	Democratic	2017–2018	Detroit	Previously served in the 3rd district; term limited.
Joseph Tate	Democratic	2019–2022	Detroit	Redistricted to the 10th district.
Tullio Liberati	Democratic	2023–present	Allen Park	Redistricted from the 13th district.
Joanna Whaley	Democratic	(Note: Member-elect.)	Lincoln Park	

== Historical district boundaries ==
Map	Description	Apportionment Plan	Notes
	Wayne County (part): Hamtramck; Highland Park	1964 Apportionment Plan (Note: Referred to as the Austin-Kleiner plan.)	
	Wayne County (part): Detroit (part)	1972 Apportionment Plan (Note: Referred to as the Hatcher-Kleiner plan.)	
	Wayne County (part): Detroit (part)	1982 Apportionment Plan	
	Wayne County (part): Detroit (part; Upper East Side)	1992 Apportionment Plan	
	Wayne County (part): Detroit (part; Upper East Side)	2001 Apportionment Plan	
	Wayne County (part): Detroit (part; Lower East Side); Grosse Pointe; Grosse Pointe Farms; Grosse Pointe Park	2011 Apportionment Plan	
	Wayne County (part): Allen Park (part); Ecorse; Lincoln Park; Southgate (part)	2021 Apportionment Plan (Note: Referred to as the Hickory plan.)	
	Wayne County (part): Allen Park; Lincoln Park; Melvindale; Southgate (part)	Remedial 2021 Apportionment Plan Approved in 2024 (Note: Referred to as the Motown Sound FC E1 plan.)	

== Recent elections ==
=== 2020s ===
2026 Michigan House of Representatives election
Party	Candidate	Votes	%
Democratic	Joanna Whaley	22,343	62.49
Republican	Ron Kokinda	13,414	37.51
Total votes		35,757	100
Democratic hold			

2024 Michigan House of Representatives election
Party	Candidate	Votes	%
Democratic	Tullio Liberati, Jr. (incumbent)	21,965	51.82
Republican	Ron Kokinda	17,972	42.4
Working Class	Mark DaSacco	2,450	5.78
Total votes		42,387	100
Democratic hold			

2022 Michigan House of Representatives election
Party	Candidate	Votes	%
Democratic	Tullio Liberati, Jr.	18,847	60.93
Republican	Michael Joseph D'Onofrio	12,083	39.07
Total votes		30,930	100
Democratic hold			

2020 Michigan House of Representatives election
Party	Candidate	Votes	%
Democratic	Joe Tate (incumbent)	28,196	74.12
Republican	Mayra Rodriguez	9,043	23.77
Independent	Danetta L. Simpson	804	2.11
Total votes		38,043	100
Democratic hold			

=== 2010s ===
2018 Michigan House of Representatives election
Party	Candidate	Votes	%
Democratic	Joe Tate	22,060	73.5
Republican	John Palffy	7,954	26.5
Total votes		30,014	100
Democratic hold			

2016 Michigan House of Representatives election
Party	Candidate	Votes	%
Democratic	Bettie Cook Scott	25,409	71.83
Republican	Anthony Matthew Murray	9,962	28.16
Write-in	Danetta L. Simpson	3	0.01
Total votes		30,014	100
Democratic hold			

2014 Michigan House of Representatives election
Party	Candidate	Votes	%
Democratic	Alberta Tinsley Talabi (incumbent)	17,369	69.38
Republican	Daniel J. Lamar	7,664	30.62
Total votes		25,033	100
Democratic hold			

2012 Michigan House of Representatives election
Party	Candidate	Votes	%
Democratic	Alberta Tinsley Talabi	28,990	71.78
Republican	Daniel Corrigan Grano	10,459	25.90
Green	Hans Christopher Barbe	938	2.32
Total votes		40,387	100
Democratic hold			

2010 Michigan House of Representatives election
Party	Candidate	Votes	%
Democratic	Lisa L. Howze	11,320	96.12
Republican	Damian C. Mitchell	457	3.88
Total votes		11,777	100
Democratic hold			

=== 2000s ===
2008 Michigan House of Representatives election
Party	Candidate	Votes	%
Democratic	LaMar Lemmons, Jr. (incumbent)	25,327	96.46
Republican	Edith Floyd	930	3.54
Total votes		26,257	100
Democratic hold			

2006 Michigan House of Representatives election
Party	Candidate	Votes	%
Democratic	LaMar Lemmons, Jr. (incumbent)	16,105	95.89
Republican	Edith Floyd	691	4.11
Total votes		16,796	100
Democratic hold			

2004 Michigan House of Representatives election
Party	Candidate	Votes	%
Democratic	LaMar Lemmons, Jr.	23,297	94.74
Republican	Edith Floyd	1,293	5.26
Total votes		16,796	100
Democratic hold			

2002 Michigan House of Representatives election
Party	Candidate	Votes	%
Democratic	Ken Daniels	14,039	95.03
Republican	Herbert Russell	734	4.97
Total votes		14,773	100
Democratic hold			

2000 Michigan House of Representatives election
Party	Candidate	Votes	%
Democratic	LaMar Lemmons III (incumbent)	19,265	92.23
Republican	Robert L. Ridley	1,121	5.37
Independent	William G. Tinsley	503	2.41
Total votes		20,889	100
Democratic hold			

=== 1990s ===
1998 Michigan House of Representatives election
Party	Candidate	Votes	%
Democratic	LaMar Lemmons III	12,931	88.61
Republican	Mary Elie Williams	1,662	11.39
Total votes		14,593	100
Democratic hold			
