= LaMar Lemmons III =

American politician from Michigan

Member of the Michigan House of Representatives
- In office January 1, 2005 – January 1, 2007
- Preceded by: Artina Tinsley Hardman
- Succeeded by: Bettie Cook Scott
- Constituency: 3rd district
- In office January 1, 1999 – January 3, 2003
- Preceded by: Curtis Hertel
- Succeeded by: Ken Daniels
- Constituency: 2nd district

Personal details
- Party: Democratic

LaMar Lemmons III (born July 7, 1957) is an American politician and educator from the state of Michigan. A member of the Democratic Party, Lemmons served in the Michigan House of Representatives from 1999 to 2003 and from 2005 to 2007.

== Career ==
Born in Detroit, Michigan, Lemmons was a social studies teacher in African-American studies and reading instructor. He also owned a political consulting/marketing firm. Lemmons served in the Michigan House of Representatives from 1999 until 2007 as a Democrat. Lemmons then served on the Detroit Board of Education and was president of the board of education. His father is Lamar Lemmons, Jr. who also served in the Michigan Legislature.
