= Alabas Farhat =

American politician

Alabbas Farhat
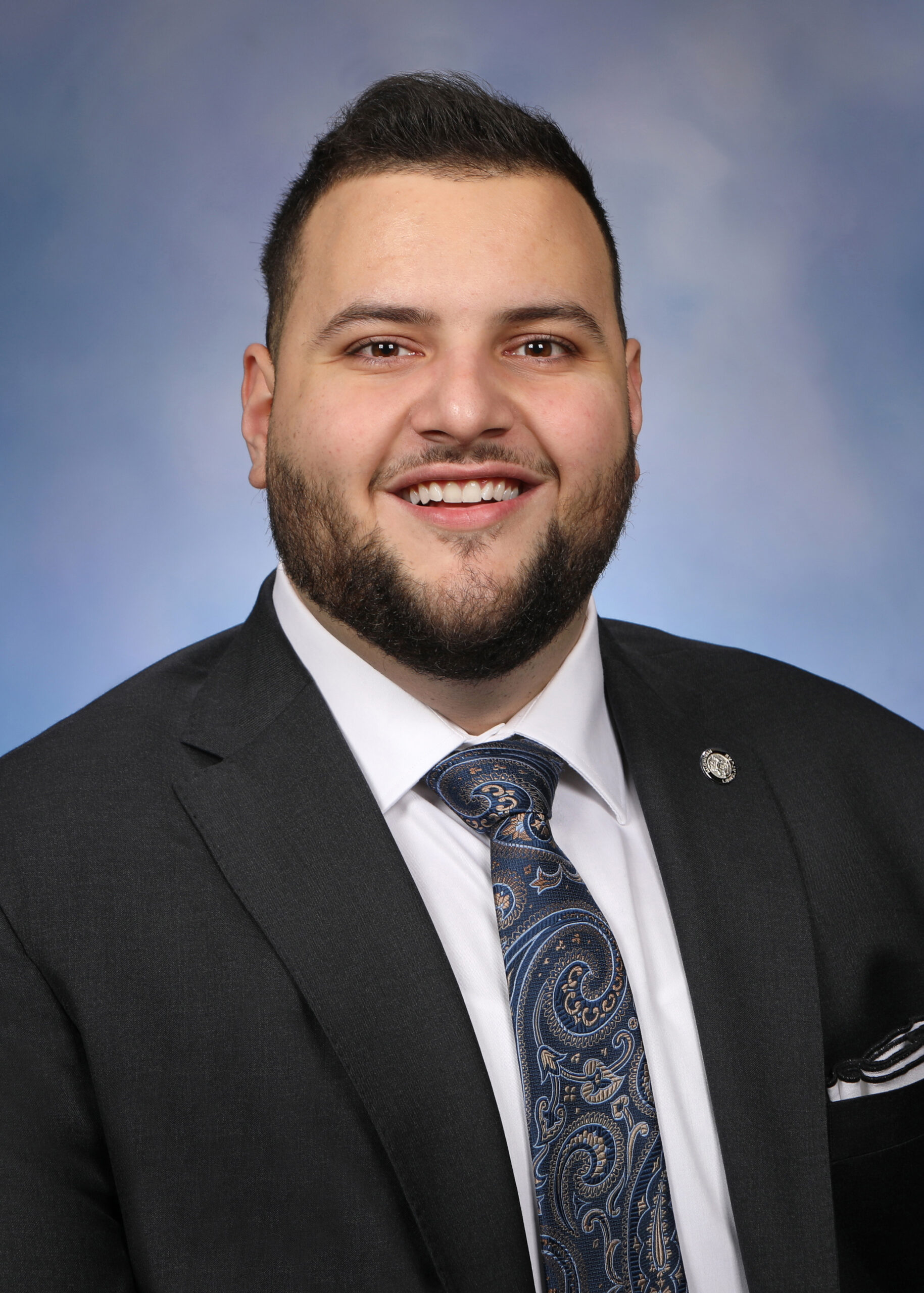

Member of the Michigan House of Representatives from the 3rd district
- Incumbent
- Assumed office January 1, 2023
- Preceded by: Shri Thanedar

Personal details
- Party: Democratic
- Education: University of Michigan, Dearborn (BS); University of Michigan, Ann Arbor (MPP)

Alabas Farhat is an American politician serving as a member of the Michigan House of Representatives since 2023, representing the 3rd district. He is a member of the Democratic Party.

== Early life and education ==
Farhat was raised in Dearborn, Michigan. He earned a Bachelor of Science degree in public health from the University of Michigan–Dearborn in 2021 and a Master of Public Administration from the Gerald R. Ford School of Public Policy in 2023.

== Career ==
Farhat has worked as an intern and field director for State Representative Abdullah Hammoud. He was also the field director for Wayne County Commissioner Sam Baydoun. He was an organizer for the Michigan Democratic Party before joining the staff of the Wayne County Executive Warren Evans.

=== State legislature ===
Farhat successfully ran for the 3rd district in the 2022 Michigan House of Representatives election. He was reelected in 2024.

In 2025, Farhat broke party lines to vote in favor of a resolution calling for the federal ban on transgender girls in women's sports under the Trump administration to be enforced in the state of Michigan.

On July 24, 2025, Republican Speaker Matt Hall removed Farhat from his role as minority vice chair of the House Appropriations Committee after Farhat voted against a life without parole bill. Democratic leaders criticized the move as disruptive to bipartisan negotiations during a critical phase of the state budget process.

=== Sponsored legislation ===
House Bill 4276 of 2023 increases transparency and expands oversight of costs associated with prescription drugs, which successfully passed into law.

House Resolution 228 of 2024 is a resolution to declare April 2024 as Arab-American Heritage Month in the state of Michigan.

House Bill 5198 of 2023 to combat the use of illegal disposable vapes that are disguised as common items such as pens.

House Bill 5716 protects religious liberty by ensuring individuals can retain their garments during booking, searches are done by same-sex officers, and additional accommodations are provided. This bill has been referred to Committee on Judiciary on May 7, 2024.

=== Cosponsored legislation ===
House Bill 4605 and House Bill 4606 of 2023 create the Public Safety and Violence Prevention Fund, enables local governments to strengthen funding for first responders and community violence intervention initiatives.

House Bill 5519 of 2024 mandates that the Strategic Fund to include data on its new insulin production program in its annual report to the legislature and governor.
