= Bettie Cook Scott =

American politician (born 1953)

Member of the Michigan House of Representatives from the 2nd district
- In office January 1, 2017 – December 31, 2018
- Preceded by: Alberta Tinsley-Talabi
- Succeeded by: Joe Tate

Member of the Michigan House of Representatives from the 3rd district
- In office January 1, 2007 – December 31, 2010
- Preceded by: LaMar Lemmons III
- Succeeded by: Alberta Tinsley-Talabi

Personal details
- Born: May 31, 1953 (age 73) Alabama
- Party: Democratic

Bettie Cook Scott (born May 31, 1953) is an American Democratic Party politician who served in the Michigan House of Representatives from the 2nd district from 2017 to 2018. She previously served in the Michigan House of Representatives from the 3rd district from 2007 to 2010.

Between 2007 and 2010 Representative Scott worked to amend the Driver Responsibility Act of 2003 while serving on the Michigan House's Labor committee and Regulatory Reform committee. In her final year she proclaimed success at repealing the driver responsibility fees resulting from that act through legislation passed in 2018.

== Controversy ==
During the 2018 Democratic primary for the state Senate, Scott made racist remarks towards people of Asian heritage, including to her opponent, Michigan state representative Stephanie Chang. Witnesses reported Scott calling Chang and her volunteers "ching chong" or "ching chang" and accusing one of Chang's campaign volunteers of being an "immigrant", saying "you don't belong here" and "I want you out of my country." Chang's husband, an African-American man, reported hearing Scott saying that it "disgusts [Scott] seeing black people holding signs for these Asians and not supporting their own people," and that he was a "fool" for marrying Chang.

Stephanie Chang commented on Scott's remarks, saying "These comments are offensive to all Asian-Americans. It isn't about me. It's about an elected official disrespecting entire populations, whether they be Asian-American, immigrant, or residents of Sen. District 1 or [Scott's] own current house district."

Scott has since made an apology for her remarks, and did not deny the accusations. Through a representative, she released a statement saying, "I deeply regret the comments I made that have proven hurtful to so many. Those are words I never should have said. I humbly apologize to Representative Chang, her husband, Mr. Gray, and to the broader Asian American community for those disparaging remarks. In the divisive age we find ourselves in, I should not contribute further to that divisiveness. I have reached out to Representative Chang to meet with her so that I may apologize to her in person. I pray she and the Asian American community can find it in their hearts to forgive me."

== Absence ==
After the loss of the state Senate primary election on August 7, 2018, Scott never returned to the state House in Lansing to pursue the business of her constituents, missing 197 votes for her entire term of office (2017–18). This was despite her assertion on September 23 that she looked forward to serve her constituents. By November 2018, the Michigan House's business office had effectively de facto taken over her office's duties until the end of her term, including addressing the needs of the residents of the 2nd House district in her stead.
