= Lisa Howze =

American politician (born 1973)

Member of the Michigan House of Representatives from the 2nd district
- In office January 1, 2011 – 2012
- Preceded by: Lamar Lemmons Jr.
- Succeeded by: Alberta Tinsley-Talabi

Personal details
- Born: August 5, 1973 (age 53) Detroit, Michigan
- Party: Democratic
- Education: Cass Technical High School; Ross School of Business; Walsh College

Lisa Howze (born August 5, 1973) is an American accountant and politician who served as member of the Michigan House of Representatives from 2011 to 2012.

== Life ==
Howze was born on August 5, 1973, in Detroit. She graduated from Cass Technical High School in 1991, from Ross School of Business in accounting, and earned a Master of Science from Walsh College.

Howze is an accountant. On November 2, 2010, Johnson was elected to the Michigan House of Representatives where she represented the 2nd district from January 12, 2011, to 2012. Howze unsuccessfully ran in the Democratic primary for the position of mayor of Detroit.
