= Artina Tinsley Hardman =

American politician (born 1951)

Member of the Michigan House of Representatives from the 3rd district
- In office January 1, 1999 – 2004
- Preceded by: Mary Lou Parks
- Succeeded by: LaMar Lemmons Jr.

Personal details
- Born: July 13, 1951 (age 75)
- Party: Democratic
- Education: Detroit School of Nursing; Wayne County Community College

Artina Tinsley Hardman (born July 13, 1951) is a former member of the Michigan House of Representatives.

== Early life ==
Hardman was born on July 13, 1951.

== Education ==
Hardman graduated from Detroit School of Nursing and earned an associate degree from Wayne County Community College.

== Career ==
Hardman was a licensed practical nurse and a health care supervisor. On November 3, 1998, Hardman was elected to the Michigan House of Representatives where she represented the 3rd district from January 13, 1999, to 2004.

== Personal life ==
Hardman is a member of the NAACP. Hardman is a member of the African Methodist Episcopal Church.
