= Mary Lou Parks =

American politician (1939–2015)

Member of the Michigan House of Representatives from the 3rd district
- In office July 1, 1993 – 1998
- Preceded by: Joseph F. Young Sr.
- Succeeded by: Artina Tinsley Hardman

Personal details
- Born: July 24, 1939 Anderson, South Carolina
- Died: August 23, 2015 (aged 76)
- Party: Democratic
- Education: Wayne State University

Mary Lou Parks (July 24, 1939 – August 23, 2015) was a Michigan politician.

== Early life ==
Parks was born on July 24, 1939, in Anderson, South Carolina.

== Education ==
Parks attended Wayne State University.

== Career ==
Parks was executive assistant to U.S. Congressman George Crockett Jr. from 1975 to 1983. Parks was the special assistant Michigan Governor James Blanchard from 1983 to 1990. State representative Joseph F. Young Sr. died on April 9, 1993, sparking a special election to fill his vacancy. On June 29, 1993, Parks won this special election. She was elected to the Michigan House of Representatives where she represented the 3rd district from July 1, 1993, to 1998. Parks ran in the 1998 Michigan Secretary of State election, but was defeated by Candice Miller. Parks was a delegate to the Democratic National Convention from Michigan in 1976, 1980, and 1988. Parks was an alternate delegate to Democratic National Convention in 1984 and 2004.

== Personal life ==
Parks was divorced and had five children. Parks was a member of the NAACP.

== Death ==
Ferguson died on August 23, 2015.

Party political offices
Preceded by Richard H. Austin	Democratic nominee for Michigan Secretary of State; 1998	Succeeded by Melvin Hollowell
