= Paul Clemente =

American politician from Michigan

Member of the Michigan House of Representatives from the 14th district
- In office January 1, 2011 – December 31, 2016
- Preceded by: Ed Clemente
- Succeeded by: Cara Clemente

Personal details
- Born: May 19, 1963 (age 63)
- Died: April 22, 2026
- Party: Democratic

Paul Clemente (born May 19, 1963) was an American politician who served in the Michigan House of Representatives from 2011 to 2016. He represented the 14th district which includes Lincoln Park, Riverview, Melvindale and Wyandotte in the Downriver section of Wayne County.

== Early life ==
Clemente was a lifelong resident of the district where his parents owned and operated Clemente's Bar, Restaurant and Bowling Alley. It closed in 2010 after 60 years in business. By that time, Clemente was a co-owner and manager.

== Career ==
Prior to being elected, Clemente was an accountant at Coopers & Lybrand.

== Personal life ==
Clemente's wife was Cara Clemente, who became a politician. They have three children. Clemente used to live in Lincoln Park, Michigan.
