= 1998 Michigan Secretary of State election =

- November 3, 1998
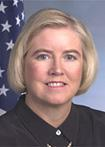

Nominee	Candice Miller	Mary Lou Parks
Party	Republican	Democratic
Popular vote	2,055,432	938,557
Percentage	67.68%	30.91%
- County results Miller: 50-60% 60-70% 70-80% 80-90%
Secretary of State before election
Candice Miller
Republican
Elected Secretary of State
Candice Miller
Republican

The 1998 Michigan Secretary of State election was held on November 3, 1998. Incumbent Republican Candice Miller defeated Democratic nominee Mary Lou Parks with 67.68% of the vote.

To date, this is the most recent statewide election in which Wayne County voted for the Republican candidate.

== General election ==
=== Candidates ===
Major party candidates

- Candice Miller, Republican
- Mary Parks, Democratic

Other candidates

- Perry Kent Spencer, Reform

=== Results ===
Michigan Secretary of State election, 1998
Party	Candidate	Votes	%
Republican	Candice Miller (incumbent)	2,055,432	67.68
Democratic	Mary Lou Parks	938,557	30.91
Reform	Perry Kent Spencer	42,897	1.41
Total votes		3,036,886	100
Republican hold			
