= Cara Clemente =

American politician from Michigan

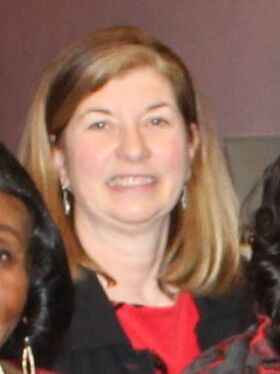
- Clemente in 2024

Member of the Michigan House of Representatives from the 14th district
- In office January 1, 2017 – January 1, 2023
- Preceded by: Paul Clemente
- Succeeded by: Donavan McKinney

Personal details
- Born: October 2, 1966 (age 59)
- Party: Democratic
- Spouse: Paul Clemente

Cara A. Clemente (born October 2, 1966) is an American politician who served in the Michigan House of Representatives from the 14th district from 2017 to 2023.
