= Joe Tate (politician) =

American politician and football player (born 1980)

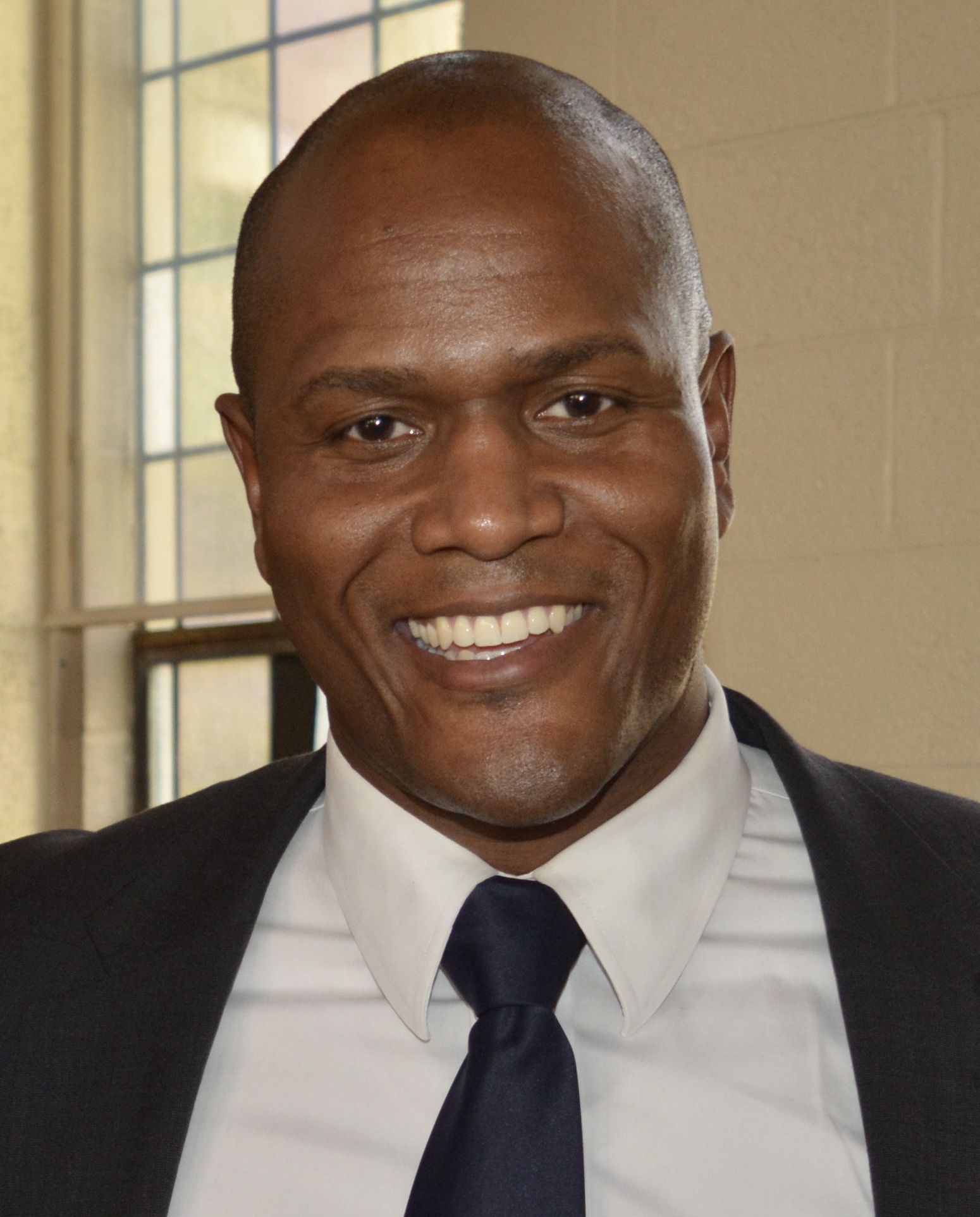
- Tate in 2016

78th Speaker of the Michigan House of Representatives
- In office January 1, 2023 – January 8, 2025
- Preceded by: Jason Wentworth
- Succeeded by: Matt Hall

Member of the Michigan House of Representatives
- Incumbent
- Assumed office January 9, 2019
- Preceded by: Bettie Cook Scott
- Succeeded by: Willie Burton (elect)
- Constituency: 2nd district (2019–2023); 10th district (2023–2025); 9th district (2025–present)

Personal details
- Born: Joseph Allen Tate; December 13, 1980 (age 45) Detroit, Michigan, U.S.
- Party: Democratic
- Education: Michigan State University (BA); University of Michigan (MS, MBA)
- Website: House website Campaign website

Joseph Allen Tate (born December 13, 1980) is an American former professional football player and U.S. Marine Corps infantry officer who served in Afghanistan. He is currently a politician serving as a member of the Michigan House of Representatives since 2019, currently representing the 9th district. A member of the Democratic Party, Tate served as the 78th speaker of the Michigan House of Representatives from 2023 to 2025. He was briefly a candidate in the 2026 United States Senate election in Michigan, but suspended his campaign and will instead seek re-election to the state House.

== Early life ==
Tate was born in Detroit, Michigan, the youngest of four children. His father, Coleman Sr., was a Detroit firefighter who died when Tate was an infant. His mother, Debra, was a Detroit public school teacher. Tate spent his early years in the Jefferson Chalmers and Sherwood Forest communities of Detroit. His mother later moved the family to Southfield, Michigan, where Tate attended Southfield-Lathrup High School, graduating in 1999.

== Education and college football career ==
Tate attended Michigan State University on a football scholarship. He earned four letters at Michigan State from 2000–03 and started 29 games his last three years at left guard. A two-time Academic All-Big Ten selection in 2000 and 2001, he garnered second-team All-Big Ten honors from the media in 2003 as the Spartans went 8-4 in the regular season and played in the Alamo Bowl against Nebraska, which ended in a loss. He made his mark off the field as well during his time in East Lansing, as he also was presented MSU's Community Service and Leadership Award.

After two seasons with the NFL, Tate returned to Michigan State University to pursue a master's degree in kinesiology while serving as a strength and conditioning graduate assistant under coach Ken Mannie in 2007 and 2008.

Tate attended the University of Michigan's Ross School of Business and School of Natural Resources obtaining his dual MBA/MS in 2017.

== National Football League ==
Tate graduated from Michigan State in 2003 with a degree in public policy and was then signed by the Jacksonville Jaguars as an offensive lineman. He later played for the Atlanta Falcons and St. Louis Rams.

== Marine Corps ==
In 2009, Tate joined the U.S. Marine Corps as an officer, serving two deployments in Afghanistan as platoon commander and company executive officer of his infantry unit during Operation Enduring Freedom. After an honorable discharge, Tate returned to his native Michigan to pursue his MBA.

== Political career ==
=== Detroit Economic Growth Corporation ===
Upon graduation in 2017, Tate became a program manager at Detroit Economic Growth Corporation.

=== Michigan politics ===
On November 6, 2018, Tate won the general election and became a member of Michigan House of Representatives, serving District 2, a community that covers part of Detroit’s Lower East Side, Grosse Pointe Park, Grosse Pointe Woods, Grosse Pointe City, and Grosse Pointe Farms. He was elected to a second term in 2020. After the Democratic Party gained control of the Michigan House of Representatives in the 2022 Michigan House of Representatives elections, Tate became the first African American to be elected Speaker of the Michigan House of Representatives.

Following court-mandated redistricting of the Detroit area, Tate ran in the 9th district for the 2024 election, winning reelection.

Political offices
| Preceded by Jason Wentworth | Speaker of the Michigan House of Representatives; 2023–2025 | Succeeded by Matt Hall |
