= Michigan's 14th House of Representatives district =

American legislative district

Michigan's 14th State House of Representatives district
Representative
Mike McFall; D–Hazel Park
- Demographics: 63.5% White; 15.3% Black; 2.7% Hispanic; 12.9% Asian; 0.2% Native American; 0.7% Other; 4.7% Multiracial
- Population (2024): 90,380

Michigan's 14th House of Representatives district is a legislative district within the Michigan House of Representatives located in the counties of Macomb and Oakland. The district was created in 1965, when the Michigan Supreme Court ordered the reapportionment of state legislative districts from a county-based system to a proportional one following the Supreme Court case Reynolds v. Sims. It is currently represented by Democrat Mike McFall of Hazel Park.

== List of representatives ==
Representative	Party	Years	Residence	Notes
Raymond W. Hood	Democratic	1965–1972	Detroit	Redistricted to the 7th district.
William A. Ryan	Democratic	1973–1982	Detroit	Redistricted from the 3rd district.
Joseph F. Young Sr.	Democratic	1983–1992	Detroit	Previously served in the 15th district; redistricted to the 3rd district.
Michael J. Bennane	Democratic	1993–1996	Detroit	Redistricted from the 1st district.
Derrick F. Hale	Democratic	1997–2002	Detroit	Term limited.
William J. O'Neil	Democratic	2003–2004	Allen Park	Redistricted from the 24th district; term limited.
Ed Clemente	Democratic	2005–2010	Lincoln Park	Term limited.
Paul D. Clemente	Democratic	2011–2016	Lincoln Park	Term limited.
Cara Clemente	Democratic	2017–2022	Lincoln Park	Term limited.
Donavan McKinney	Democratic	2023–2024	Detroit	Redistricted to the 11th district.
Mike McFall	Democratic	2025–present	Hazel Park	Redistricted from the 8th district.

== Historical district boundaries ==
Map	Description	Apportionment Plan	Notes
	Wayne County (part): Detroit (part)	1964 Apportionment Plan (Note: Referred to as the Austin-Kleiner plan.)	
	Wayne County (part): Detroit (part)	1972 Apportionment Plan (Note: Referred to as the Hatcher-Kleiner plan.)	
	Wayne County (part): Detroit (part)	1982 Apportionment Plan	
	Wayne County (part): Detroit (part)	1992 Apportionment Plan	
	Wayne County (part): Allen Park (part); Ecorse; Lincoln Park; Melvindale; River Rouge	2001 Apportionment Plan	
	Wayne County (part): Lincoln Park; Melvindale; Riverview; Wyandotte	2011 Apportionment Plan	
	Macomb County (part): Center Line; Warren (part); Wayne County (part): Detroit (part)	2021 Apportionment Plan (Note: Referred to as the Hickory plan.)	
	Macomb County (part): Center Line; Warren (part); Oakland County (part): Hazel Park; Madison Heights (part)	Remedial 2021 Apportionment Plan Approved in 2024 (Note: Referred to as the Motown Sound FC E1 plan.)	

== Recent elections ==
=== 2020s ===
2026 Michigan House of Representatives election
Party	Candidate	Votes	%
Democratic	Mike McFall (incumbent)	27,032	67.39
Republican	Larry Szyska	12,347	30.78
Green	Jeff Sparling	732	1.82
Total votes		40,111	100
Democratic hold			

2024 Michigan House of Representatives election
Party	Candidate	Votes	%
Democratic	Mike McFall	26,669	59.06
Republican	Barbara Barber	18,489	40.94
Total votes		45,158	100
Democratic hold			

2022 Michigan House of Representatives election
Party	Candidate	Votes	%
Democratic	Donavan McKinney	18,968	71.35
Republican	Wendy Jo Watters	7,174	26.98
Green	Jeff Sparling	444	1.67
Total votes		26,586	100
Democratic hold			

2020 Michigan House of Representatives election
Party	Candidate	Votes	%
Democratic	Cara A. Clemente (incumbent)	23,096	56.66
Republican	Darrell Stasik	15,729	38.59
Working Class	Simone R. Coleman	1,937	4.75
Total votes		40,762	100
Democratic hold			

=== 2010s ===
2018 Michigan House of Representatives election
Party	Candidate	Votes	%
Democratic	Cara A. Clemente (incumbent)	18,694	63.61
Republican	Darrell Stasik	10,695	36.39
Total votes		29,389	100
Democratic hold			

2016 Michigan House of Representatives election
Party	Candidate	Votes	%
Democratic	Cara A. Clemente	20,252	59.44
Republican	Darrell Stasik	12,178	35.75
Libertarian	Loel R. Gnadt	1,639	4.81
Total votes		34,069	100
Democratic hold			

2014 Michigan House of Representatives election
Party	Candidate	Votes	%
Democratic	Paul Clemente (incumbent)	14,661	70.2
Republican	Nathan Inks	6,223	29.8
Total votes		20,884	100
Democratic hold			

2012 Michigan House of Representatives election
Party	Candidate	Votes	%
Democratic	Paul Clemente (incumbent)	23,993	70.92
Republican	Edward Gubics	8,763	25.9
Libertarian	Loel R. Gnadt	1,076	3.18
Total votes		33,832	100
Democratic hold			

2010 Michigan House of Representatives election
Party	Candidate	Votes	%
Democratic	Paul Clemente	14,536	67.28
Republican	Patrick D. O'Connell	7,069	32.72
Total votes		21,605	100
Democratic hold			

=== 2000s ===
2008 Michigan House of Representatives election
Party	Candidate	Votes	%
Democratic	Ed Clemente (incumbent)	28,709	76.34
Republican	Patrick D. O'Connell	8,899	23.66
Total votes		37,608	100
Democratic hold			

2006 Michigan House of Representatives election
Party	Candidate	Votes	%
Democratic	Ed Clemente (incumbent)	21,776	78.29
Republican	Dave Stone	6,038	21.71
Total votes		27,814	100
Democratic hold			

2004 Michigan House of Representatives election
Party	Candidate	Votes	%
Democratic	Ed Clemente	27,504	72.56
Republican	Theresa Dombrowski	10,402	27.44
Total votes		37,906	100
Democratic hold			

2002 Michigan House of Representatives election
Party	Candidate	Votes	%
Democratic	William J. O'Neil	17,277	73.95
Republican	Chris B. O'Loughlin	6,085	26.05
Total votes		23,362	100
Democratic hold			

2000 Michigan House of Representatives election
Party	Candidate	Votes	%
Democratic	Derrick F. Hale (incumbent)	21,789	93.42
Republican	Nicole H. Aikens	1,534	6.58
Total votes		23,323	100
Democratic hold			

=== 1990s ===
1998 Michigan House of Representatives election
Party	Candidate	Votes	%
Democratic	Derrick F. Hale (incumbent)	15,716	100
Total votes		15,716	100
Democratic hold			
