= Wendell Byrd =

American politician

Member of the Michigan House of Representatives from the 3rd district
- In office January 1, 2015 – January 1, 2021
- Preceded by: John Olumba
- Succeeded by: Shri Thanedar

Personal details
- Party: Democratic
- Education: Davenport University (BS)
- Website: Official website

Wendell L. Byrd is an American politician, businessman, and former accountant who served in the Michigan House of Representatives from 2015 to 2021.

== Education ==
Byrd earned a Bachelor's of Science degree in Accounting Development from the Detroit College of Business, now a part of Davenport University.

== Career ==
Before serving in the Legislature, Byrd worked as an accountant and tax auditor for the state of Michigan and as deputy comptroller of Ecorse, Michigan. He retired from the state after 28 years, and in 2013, was elected to the recently formed Detroit Police Commission. He is also a small business owner.

Byrd currently sits on the House Commerce and Trade, Energy and Tax Policy Committees.

He was previously a candidate for the Michigan House in 1998, 2000, 2004, and 2006.

He retired in 2020 to run unsuccessfully for the Wayne County Commission.
