= Michigan's 3rd House of Representatives district =

American legislative district

Michigan's 3rd State House of Representatives district
Representative
Alabas Farhat; D–Dearborn
- Demographics: 82% White; 8% Black; 3.2% Hispanic; 1.9% Asian; 0.1% Native American; 0.3% Other; 4.5% Multiracial
- Population (2024): 88,484

Michigan's 3rd House of Representatives district is a legislative district within the Michigan House of Representatives located in Wayne County. The district was created in 1965, when the Michigan Supreme Court ordered the reapportionment of state legislative districts from a county-based system to a proportional one following the Supreme Court case Reynolds v. Sims. It is currently represented by Democrat Alabas Farhat of Dearborn.

== List of representatives ==
Representative	Party	Years	Residence	Notes
William A. Ryan	Democratic	1965–1972	Detroit	Reapportioned from the former Wayne County, 3rd district; redistricted to the 14th district.
Casmer P. Ogonowski	Democratic	1973–1982	Detroit	Redistricted from the 19th district; resigned March 1982 after pleading guilty to extortion charges.
Clement Bykowski	Democratic	1982 (Note: Elected in a 1982 special election to replace Rep. Casmer P. Ogonowski, who resigned.)	Detroit	
Matthew McNeely	Democratic	1983–1986	Detroit	Redistricted from the 16th district.
Ilona Varga	Democratic	1987–1992	Detroit	Redistricted to the 8th district.
Joseph F. Young Sr.	Democratic	1993	Detroit	Redistricted from the 14th district; died April 1993.
Mary Lou Parks	Democratic	1993 (Note: Elected in a 1993 special election to replace Rep. Joseph F. Young Sr., who died.)–1998	Detroit	Term limited.
Artina Tinsley Hardman	Democratic	1999–2004	Detroit	Term limited.
LaMar Lemmons III	Democratic	2005–2006	Detroit	Previously served in the 2nd district; term limited.
Bettie Cook Scott	Democratic	2007–2010	Detroit	
Alberta Tinsley Talabi	Democratic	2011–2012	Detroit	Redistricted to the 2nd district.
John Olumba	Democratic	2013	Detroit	Redistricted from the 5th district; elected as a Democrat but left the party and departed the caucus in February 2013 to form the Independent Urban Democracy Caucus.
John Olumba	Independent	2013–2014	Detroit	Redistricted from the 5th district; elected as a Democrat but left the party and departed the caucus in February 2013 to form the Independent Urban Democracy Caucus.
Wendell Byrd	Democratic	2015–2020	Detroit	Term limited.
Shri Thanedar	Democratic	2021–2022	Detroit	
Alabas Farhat	Democratic	2023–present	Dearborn	

== Historical district boundaries ==
Map	Description	Apportionment Plan	Notes
	Wayne County (part): Detroit (part)	1964 Apportionment Plan (Note: Referred to as the Austin-Kleiner plan.)	
	Wayne County (part): Detroit (part)	1972 Apportionment Plan (Note: Referred to as the Hatcher-Kleiner plan.)	
	Wayne County (part): Detroit (part)	1982 Apportionment Plan	
	Wayne County (part): Detroit (part; Lower East Side)	1992 Apportionment Plan	
	Wayne County (part): Detroit (part; Lower East Side)	2001 Apportionment Plan	
	Wayne County (part): Detroit (part; Upper East Side and much of the area around Palmer Park)	2011 Apportionment Plan	
	Wayne County (part): Dearborn (part); Detroit (part); Melvindale	2021 Apportionment Plan (Note: Referred to as the Hickory plan.)	
	Wayne County (part): Dearborn (part); Detroit (part)	Remedial 2021 Apportionment Plan Approved in 2024 (Note: Referred to as the Motown Sound FC E1 plan.)	

== Recent elections ==
=== 2020s ===
2026 Michigan House of Representatives election
Party	Candidate	Votes	%
Democratic	Alabas Farhat (incumbent)	25,041	85.39
Republican	Gus Tarraf	4,284	14.61
Total votes		29,325	100
Democratic hold			

2024 Michigan House of Representatives election
Party	Candidate	Votes	%
Democratic	Alabas Farhat (incumbent)	17,275	67.91
Republican	Richard A. Zeile	7,051	27.72
Working Class	Larry Betts	1,112	4.37
Total votes		25,438	100
Democratic hold			

2022 Michigan House of Representatives election
Party	Candidate	Votes	%
Democratic	Alabas Farhat	15,595	74.59
Republican	Ginger L. Shearer	5,308	25.39
Write-in	Shona Doreen Beasley	4	0.02
Total votes		20,907	100
Democratic hold			

2020 Michigan House of Representatives election
Party	Candidate	Votes	%
Democratic	Shri Thanedar	28,575	93.32
Republican	Anita Vinson	1,234	4.03
Green	Stephen Boyle	813	2.65
Total votes		30,622	100
Democratic hold			

=== 2010s ===
2018 Michigan House of Representatives election
Party	Candidate	Votes	%
Democratic	Wendell L. Byrd (incumbent)	22,179	96.72
Republican	Dolores Brodersen	751	3.28
Total votes		22,930	100
Democratic hold			

2016 Michigan House of Representatives election
Party	Candidate	Votes	%
Democratic	Wendell L. Byrd (incumbent)	28,766	96.79
Republican	John Brodersen	955	3.21
Total votes		29,721	100
Democratic hold			

2014 Michigan House of Representatives election
Party	Candidate	Votes	%
Democratic	Wendell L. Byrd	19,481	97.09
Republican	Dolores Brodersen	583	2.91
Total votes		20,064	100
Democratic gain from Independent			

2012 Michigan House of Representatives election
Party	Candidate	Votes	%
Democratic	John Olumba (Note: Rep. Olumba left the Democratic Party and House caucus in 2013 and formed the Independent Urban Democracy Caucus.)	33,938	95.86
Republican	Dolores Brodersen	1,029	2.91
Green	Louis M. Novak	436	1.23
Total votes		35,403	100
Democratic hold			

2010 Michigan House of Representatives election
Party	Candidate	Votes	%
Democratic	Alberta Tinsley Talabi	13,200	93.99
Republican	Daniel J. Lamar	522	3.72
Green	Fred Vitale	322	2.29
Total votes		14,044	100
Democratic hold			

=== 2000s ===
2008 Michigan House of Representatives election
Party	Candidate	Votes	%
Democratic	Bettie Cook Scott (incumbent)	27,828	97.04
Green	Fred Vitale	468	1.63
Libertarian	Tim Beck	381	1.33
Total votes		26,677	100
Democratic hold			

2006 Michigan House of Representatives election
Party	Candidate	Votes	%
Democratic	Bettie Cook Scott	17,797	94.43
Republican	Shirley A. Lamar	700	3.71
Green	Fred Vitale	350	1.86
Total votes		18,847	100
Democratic hold			

2004 Michigan House of Representatives election
Party	Candidate	Votes	%
Democratic	LaMar Lemmons III	25,938	95.69
Republican	Michael F. Embry	1,167	4.31
Total votes		27,105	100
Democratic hold			

2002 Michigan House of Representatives election
Party	Candidate	Votes	%
Democratic	Artina Tinsley Hardman (incumbent)	16,520	95.82
Republican	Michael F. Embry	720	4.18
Total votes		17,240	100
Democratic hold			

2000 Michigan House of Representatives election
Party	Candidate	Votes	%
Democratic	Artina Tinsley Hardman (incumbent)	19,780	94.75
Republican	Michael F. Embry	750	3.59
Libertarian	Joann M. Karpinski	345	1.65
Total votes		20,875	100
Democratic hold			

=== 1990s ===
1998 Michigan House of Representatives election
Party	Candidate	Votes	%
Democratic	Artina Tinsley Hardman	15,073	92.25
Republican	Marlyss J. Landeros	868	5.31
Libertarian	Joann M. Karpinski	399	2.44
Total votes		16,340	100
Democratic hold			
