= Shri Thanedar =

American businessman and politician (born 1955)

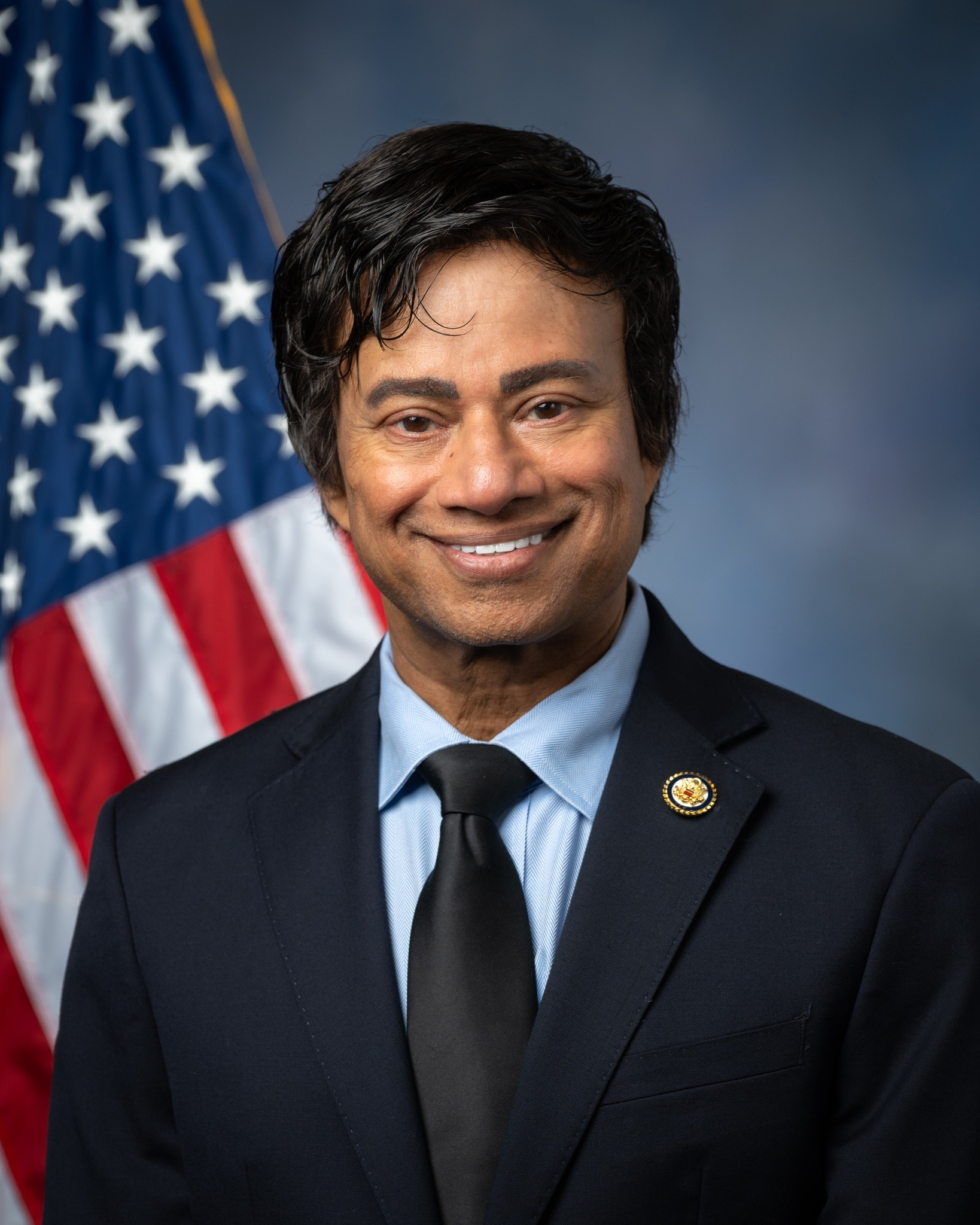
- Official portrait, 2025

Member of the U.S. House of Representatives from Michigan's 13th district
- Incumbent
- Assumed office January 3, 2023
- Preceded by: Rashida Tlaib (redistricted)

Member of the Michigan House of Representatives from the 3rd district
- In office January 1, 2021 – January 1, 2023
- Preceded by: Wendell Byrd
- Succeeded by: Alabas Farhat

Personal details
- Born: February 22, 1955 (age 71) Chikkodi, Mysore State, India
- Citizenship: India (1955–1988); United States (1988–present)
- Party: Democratic
- Other political affiliations: Democratic Socialists of America (before 2023)
- Spouses: Shamal (m. 1984; died 1996); Shashi (m. 1999)
- Children: 2
- Education: Karnatak University (BS); University of Mumbai (MS); University of Akron (PhD)
- Website: House website Campaign website
- Thanedar's voice Thanedar on small businesses. Recorded March 10, 2023

Shri Thanedar (born February 22, 1955) is an Indian-born American businessman, author, and politician serving as the U.S. representative from Michigan's 13th congressional district since 2023. A member of the Democratic Party, Thanedar served as a member of the Michigan House of Representatives from 2021 to 2023. He was also a candidate in the Democratic primary for Governor of Michigan in the 2018 election. First elected to Congress in 2022, then again in 2024, Thanedar lost renomination in 2026 in the Democratic primary to democratic socialist Donavan McKinney.

== Early life and education ==
Shri Thanedar was born on February 22, 1955 in Chikkodi, Mysore State, India, in a Marathi family. He earned a bachelor's degree in chemistry from Karnatak University and then attended a master's program at the University of Mumbai.

He moved to the U.S. in 1979 to pursue a PhD at the University of Akron, which he completed in 1982. Thanedar did post-doctoral work at the University of Michigan.

Thanedar became a U.S. citizen in 1988.

== Business career ==
In 1984, Thanedar started working at Petrolite in St. Louis. In 1990, Thanedar took a job working nights and weekends for $15/hour at Chemir/Polytech Laboratories. In 1991, he took out a loan to buy Chemir for $75,000. Sales in the first year were $150,000 and the business had three employees. By 2005, Chemir's revenues were $16 million and it employed 160 people, including 40 PhD chemists.

Thanedar borrowed $24 million from Bank of America to finance seven acquisitions, offering the bank a personal guarantee to back the debt. One acquisition, Azopharma, grew rapidly from $1 million in 2003 to $55 million in 2008. Thanedar's group of companies employed 500 people in 2008. He built a mansion in Ladue, Missouri with an in-home theater to accommodate 150 people. The mansion was later foreclosed following a bankruptcy and in 2010 Thanedar moved to Michigan with his family.

In 2007, Thanedar was offered $132 million to sell Azopharma. During the 2007–10 recession in the United States, Azopharma's revenue fell by 70%, triggering bankruptcy proceedings by Bank of America. Azopharma closed and its assets were sold for $2 million. During the bankruptcy proceedings, AniClin, one of Azopharma's research facilities of which Thanedar was the sole owner, abruptly closed; a 2010 USA Today article reported that laboratory animals were abandoned at the facility after the company was placed in receivership. According to later reports, employees climbed the fences to care for the animals until animal welfare organizations gained legal access and facilitated the adoption of all animals in the facility. Thanedar denied that any animals were abandoned.

Chemir remained profitable throughout the legal proceedings and was sold on March 31, 2011, for $23 million. That sale plus the combined assets in the firm covered Thanedar's debt to Bank of America.

=== Avomeen ===
Thanedar launched Avomeen Analytical Services, an Ann Arbor-based chemical testing laboratory, with his son Neil in 2010. Avomeen was named to the INC 5000 list of fastest-growing U.S. companies in 2015 (#673) and 2016 (#1365). In 2016, Thanedar sold a majority stake in the business to private equity firm High Street Capital, netting him $20 million personally. He shared $1.5 million of the proceeds with his 50 employees.

Thanedar was named the Ernst & Young Entrepreneur of the Year for the Central Midwest Region (Missouri, Kansas, Iowa and Nebraska) in 1999, 2007, and 2016. He maintains 40% ownership of Avomeen.

==== Lawsuit ====
In November 2017, a buyer of Avomeen Holdings LLC filed a lawsuit in the U.S. District Court in Detroit, claiming Thanedar made "fraudulent and misleading representations" of his company's finances in order to sell the majority stake in November 2016. Thanedar denies the allegations, saying that revenues "are anticipated to significantly exceed" those of past periods. US District Judge Gershwin A. Drain dismissed the case in August 2019, citing a notice from Thanedar and Avomeen Holdings LLC that they had reached an agreement to resolve the matter out of court.

== Early political career ==
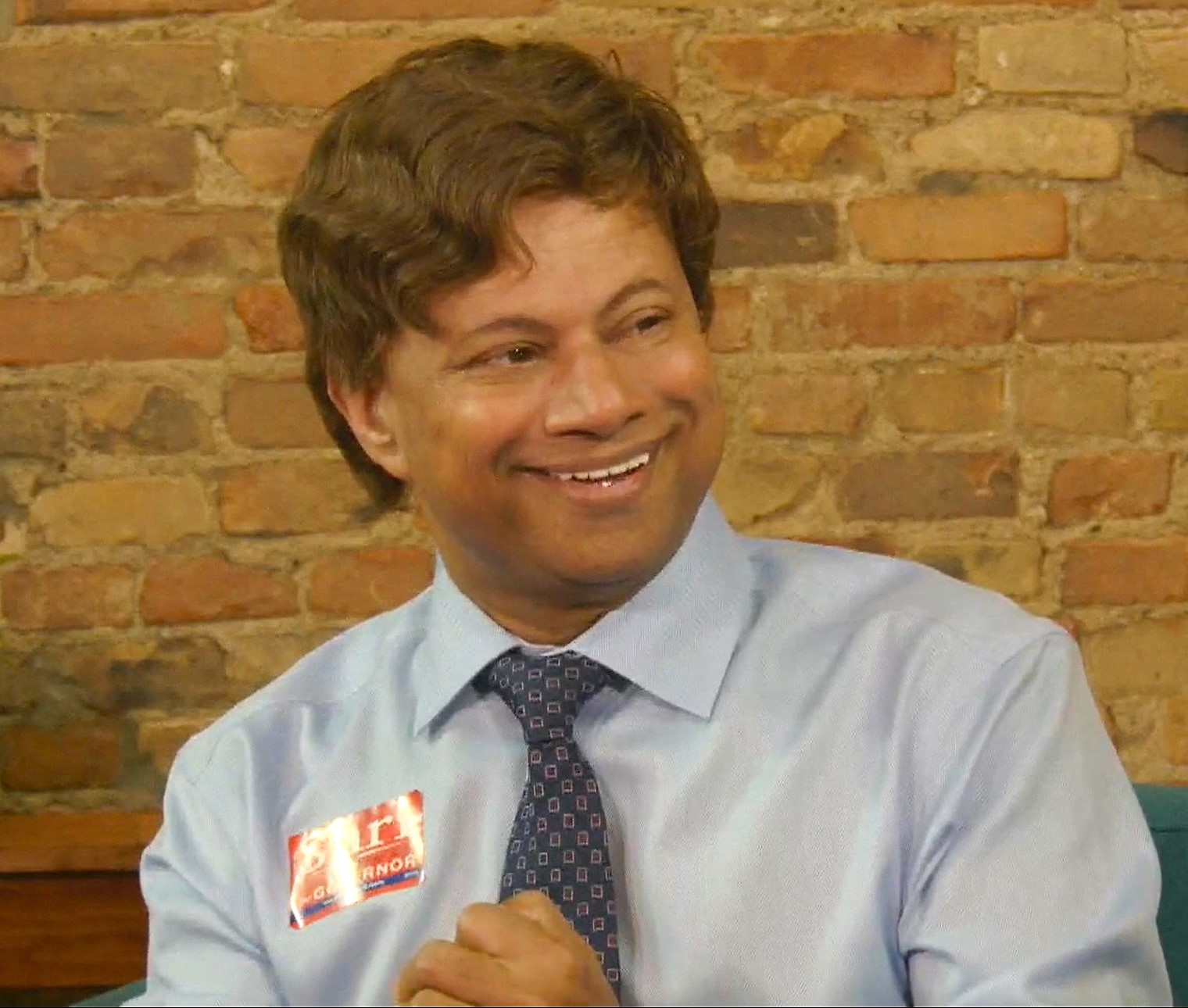
Thanedar on The Bart Hawley Show, 2018

Thanedar entered politics when he ran in the 2018 Michigan gubernatorial election as a Democrat. His political platform included a $15 minimum wage, public education reform, infrastructure improvements, and increased government transparency.

=== 2018 gubernatorial campaign ===
On April 5, 2017, Thanedar submitted paperwork to raise funds for a potential gubernatorial campaign in Michigan. On June 8, he officially announced his candidacy for governor of Michigan in the 2018 Democratic primary. He pledged not to accept any corporate political action committee donations. Thanedar contributed between $10.3 million and $10.6 million of his own money to his campaign. Early polling in 2017 showed him in last place at 2% to 3%. After running a statewide Super Bowl ad in February 2018, he quickly became the best-known Democratic candidate for governor. Thanedar lead in statewide Democratic polls in March (21% to 18%) and April (30% to 26%) versus Gretchen Whitmer, the presumptive Democratic front-runner.

As Thanedar's campaign gained public traction in early 2018, reporters at The Intercept and HuffPost began investigating Thanedar's history. Thanedar had not held elective office before running for governor in 2017, so he did not have an official record as a Democrat. Campaign finance records show that he made 18 donations to Democratic campaigns and one to a Republican campaign before running for office. The Republican donation, $2,300 to the 2008 Republican presidential campaign of John McCain, led to controversy that Thanedar might not be as progressive as he claimed. Political strategists who met with Thanedar before his 2018 campaign also claimed that he initially questioned whether he wanted to run as a Democrat or Republican in the gubernatorial race. Thanedar denied the claims, saying that these strategists were criticizing him because he did not hire their firms. He also faced allegations that laboratory animals were abandoned at one of his former research facilities after Bank of America placed that business into receivership in 2010, which he denied.

These controversies hurt Thanedar's campaign and he failed to poll over 30% again. In the primary, he won the City of Detroit, but finished third statewide; he received 200,645 votes (17.7%), placing him in third behind Whitmer's 588,436 votes (52.0%) and Abdul El-Sayed's 342,179 votes (30.2%). Thanedar's support was heavily concentrated in cities with high African American populations like Detroit, Flint, Inkster, and Pontiac.

Thanedar self-funded his campaign with nearly $10.6 million, which was more than the total amount raised by every other Democratic or Republican in the primary elections, and nearly a third of the amount raised by all candidates combined.

=== 2020 Michigan House of Representatives campaign ===
In August 2019, Thanedar submitted paperwork to run for state representative in Michigan's 3rd district, a portion of the upper east side of Detroit. On August 4, 2020, he won the Democratic primary for the seat. On November 3, 2020, Thanedar was elected to the state house. He assumed office on January 1, 2021.

== U.S. House of Representatives ==
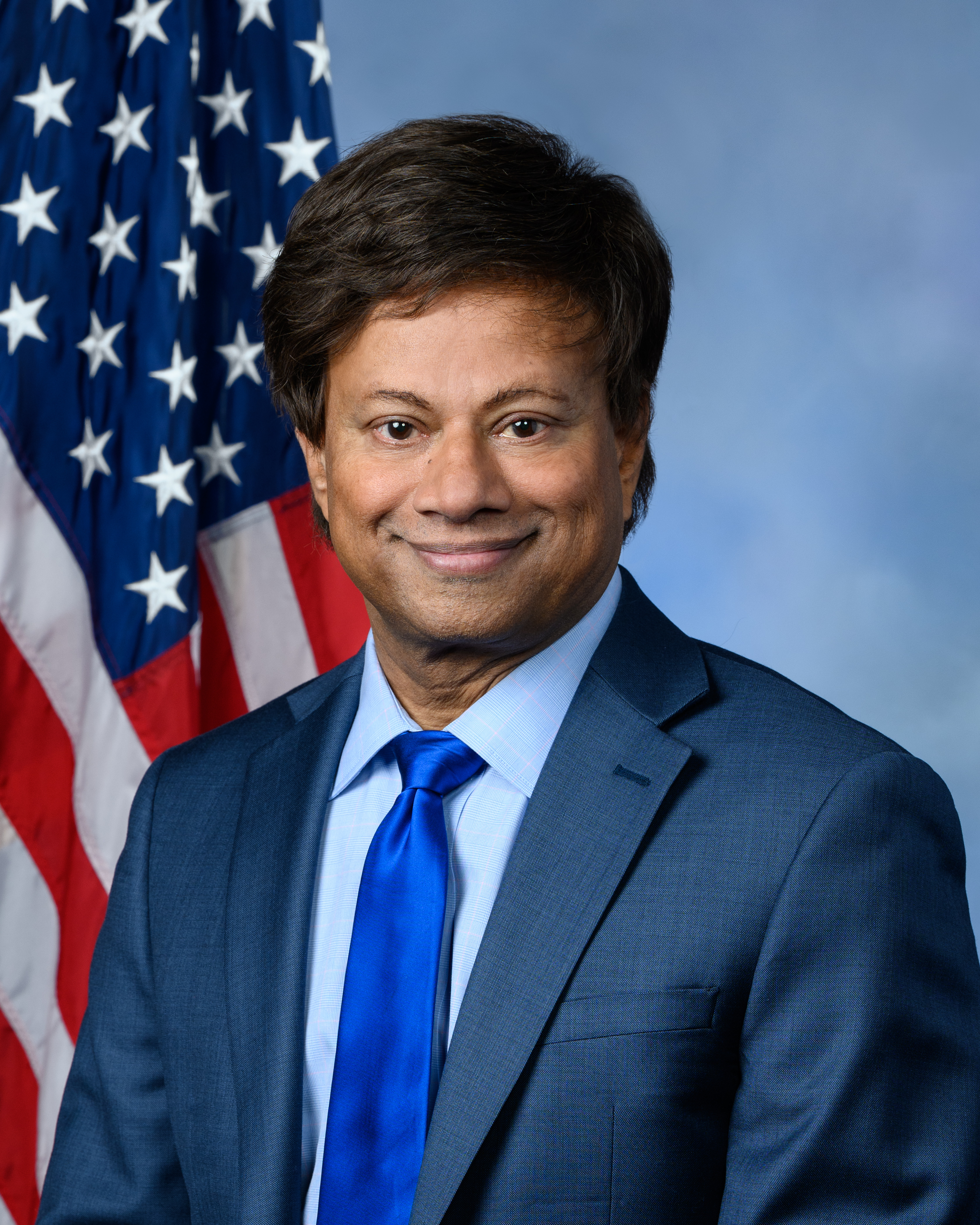
Thanedar during the 118th Congress

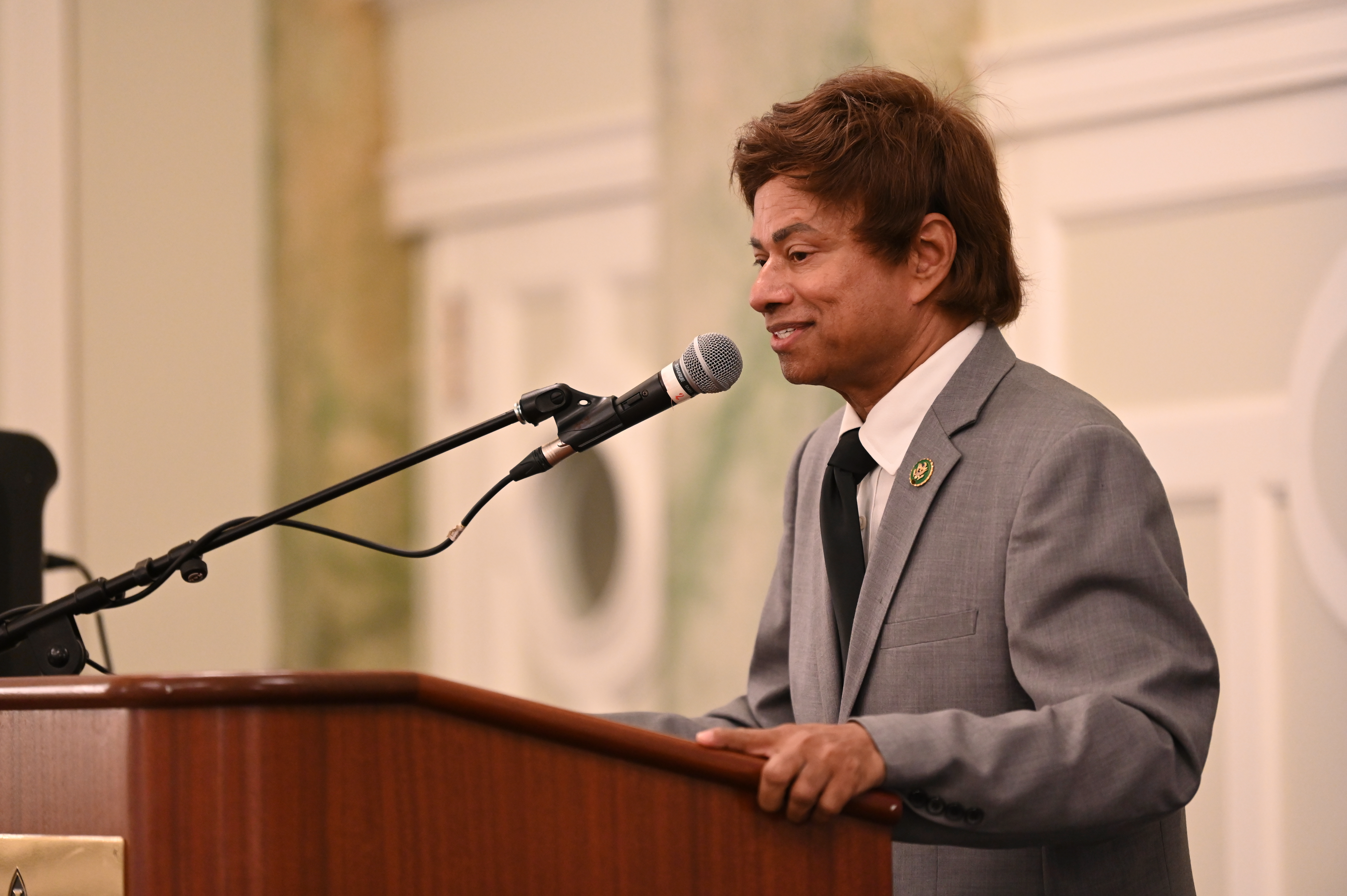
Thanedar speaks at Executive Connect in 2023.

=== Political positions ===
Healthcare

Thanedar has stated he believes healthcare is a human right and supports Medicare for All. He is a cosponsor of HR 3069, the Medicare for All Act. As someone who lost his first wife to mental illness, Congressman Thanedar has been a proponent of various mental health initiatives. He worked on legislation to designate September 8 as "988" day in order to promote the 988 suicide and crisis hotline, worked on a bill to allow Medicaid to provide financial assistance to patients in a mental health facility, and a bill to allow service members to keep their mental health provider when their care is transferred to the Department of Veterans Affairs.

Iran War

Congressman Thanedar opposes the Iran War, and held a townhall where he said the "war is illegal". Citing the Iran war, as well as tariffs, Thanedar sent a letter to President Trump's cabinet, requesting they invoke the 25th Amendment to remove the President.

Animal Rights

In Congress, Thanedar has been a proponent of animal rights. He received a score of 100% from Humane Society and received their legislative leader award. He introduced HR 4422, the Don't Feed the Bears Act, to ban bear baiting. During the 2026 Farm Bill markup, Congressman Thanedar spoke in favor of removing provisions that made it harder for the USDA to protect dogs in puppy mills.

Thanedar also introduced an amendment based on the FIGHT Act during the markup, which would ban online gambling on animal fights, allow courts to seize fighting pit bulls and other property used by convicted animal fighters in the commission of their crimes, stop the shipment of fighting roosters through the mail, and allow advocates to bring civil suits against cockfighters and dogfighters. The amendment faced opposition from Republican Ag committee chair, Representative Glenn Thompson. However, a provision of the FIGHT Act survived, which banned in person and online gambling on animal fights.

==== Israel ====
Thanedar previously co-sponsored a resolution to halt aid to Israel, describing it as an apartheid state, in the Michigan House of Representatives. The next year, he faced opposition from the American Israel Public Affairs Committee (AIPAC) in his run for the US House. In August 2023, he traveled to Israel with the American Israel Education Foundation, an AIPAC affiliate. On return, he described the relationship between Israel and the United States as mutually beneficial. AIPAC heavily funded Thanedar during the 2026 primary campaign in Michigan.

On October 11, 2023, the Detroit Free Press reported that Thanedar had "renounced his membership in the Democratic Socialists of America (DSA), saying it hasn't adequately denounced Hamas for its 'brutal terrorist attacks' on Israel last weekend". This came after the Detroit chapter of the DSA had already moved to expel Thanedar after he escorted Indian prime minister Narendra Modi, whose premiership a chapter spokesperson called "far right, violent, [and] Islamophobic", on a state visit to the US.

In his 2024 primary election, the pro-Israel super political action committee called Blue Wave Action, linked to AIPAC, formed and quickly spent nearly $2.3 million on television ads and mail advertisements attacking his election opponent, who was a vocal critic of the ongoing Gaza war.

==== Immigrations and Customs Enforcement (ICE) ====
In August 2025, Thanedar introduced the Ending Qualified immunity for ICE Agents Act (H.R. 4944), saying "If an ICE agent violates the law, it only makes sense they are held accountable just like civilians". In January 2026, Thanedar introduced the Abolish ICE Act (H.R. 7123). The legislation proposes dismantling ICE and ending its enforcement authority. His office announced the bill on January 9, 2026 and it was officially introduced in the House on January 15, 2026. The bill was proposed shortly after the fatal shooting of Renee Good by an ICE agent on January 7, 2026 in Minneapolis. Thanedar described ICE as "beyond reform".

In March 2026, Thanedar opposed a planned ICE facility in his district in Romulus. Thanedar lead a townhall and protest against the proposed ICE facility in his district. Ultimately, the Department of Homeland Security scrapped its plans, and decided to sell the facility.

=== Articles of impeachment ===
==== Donald Trump ====
On April 29, 2025, Thanedar filed multiple articles of impeachment against President Donald Trump. Charges include usurpation of Congress's appropriation powers, obstruction of justice, abuse of power, bribery, and corruption. These articles of impeachment did not receive party-wide support, faced intra party backlash, and notably lacked approval from party leadership. On May 14, 2025, Thanedar cancelled a vote on his bill after pressure from other Democrats.

The articles of impeachment were strongly criticized by Democrats as a "rogue" attempt to blindside and mislead the party, and was seen as a "selfish" way to strengthen his position in the competitive primary he would be facing in 2026 against Michigan State Rep. Donavan McKinney who had announced his campaign on the same day. It was also opposed by Democrats who had previously led the first and second impeachment of Donald Trump in his first term. Some saw it as a publicity stunt.

==== Pete Hegseth ====
On December 4, 2025, Thanedar introduced articles of impeachment against Secretary of Defense Pete Hegseth for murder and conspiracy to murder, and for reckless and mishandling of classified information. Democratic House minority leader Hakeem Jeffries said it is almost impossible for these articles to see the House floor.

=== Elections ===
==== 2022 ====
In 2022, Thanedar gave up his state house seat and moved from Ann Arbor to the Palmer Woods neighborhood to run for Michigan's 13th congressional district. The incumbent, Rashida Tlaib, had her home drawn into the 12th district and was reelected there. Thanedar contributed $5.17 million of his own money to the campaign. Thanedar won the open primary, defeating state senator Adam Hollier and others with 28.3% of the vote. He defeated Republican nominee Martell Bivings and two third-party candidates in the November 8 general election with 71.1% of the vote.

==== 2024 ====
Thanedar faced Mary D. Waters, a member of the Detroit City Council, and Shakira Hawkins, a former employee of the city of Detroit, in the Democratic primary. Both Waters and Hawkins argued that the district needed Black representation, given the area's demographics. Thanedar was renominated with 54.9% of the vote. In the general election, he won reelection in a rematch against Bivings and three third-party candidates, this time with 68.6% of the vote.

==== 2026 ====
Thanedar was challenged in the 2026 Democratic primary by Donavan McKinney, state representative from the 11th district. Thanedar was endorsed by Democratic Leader Hakeem Jeffries, Whip Katherine Clark, and Chair Pete Aguilar. Other endorsements included Planned Parenthood, 314 Action, the Congressional Progressive Caucus, and Animal Wellness Action. However, McKinney was backed by local politicians and organizations such as congresswoman Rashida Tlaib, former congresswoman Brenda Lawrence, the Metro Detroit chapter of the Democratic Socialists of America, and over a dozen state legislators. On August 4, McKinney defeated Thanedar in the Democratic primary, 51.9%–48.1%.

=== Committee assignments ===
For the 119th Congress:

- Committee on Agriculture
  - Subcommittee on Commodity Markets, Digital Assets, and Rural Development
- Committee on Homeland Security
  - Subcommittee on Oversight, Investigations, and Accountability

=== Caucuses ===
Thanedar is a member of the following caucuses:

- Black Maternal Health Caucus
- Congressional Asian Pacific American Caucus
- Climate Solutions Caucus
- Congressional Progressive Caucus
- Congressional Equality Caucus
- New Democrat Coalition

Early in his House tenure, Thanedar attempted to join the Congressional Black Caucus.

In September 2023, Thanedar attempted to launch the Dharma Caucus, representing Hindu, Jain, Buddhist, and Sikh Americans. Thanedar stated the caucus "is a statement of commitment to stand against religious discrimination, to propel the wheels of inclusion, and to cultivate a nation where diversity is not only tolerated, but celebrated". South Asian advocacy groups, including Hindus for Human Rights, Sikh Coalition, Sikh American Legal Defense and Education Fund, Emgage, and Indian American Muslim Council, put out a joint statement voicing concern on the lack of "perspectives of the entire South Asian community across faith, caste and ethnic lines". The groups collectively argued that due to lack of broader inclusivity, the Dharma caucus could work against the ability to "provide meaningful oversight of the US-India relationship, ongoing work to protect the civil rights and safety of Sikhs and other marginalized groups, and efforts to ban caste discrimination at a federal level".

== Controversies ==
=== Lab animal abandonment ===
About 170 dogs and 55 monkeys were rescued in July 2010 from an abandoned pharmaceutical testing lab in New Jersey owned by Thanedar, after it went bankrupt in April 2010. Local animal rights activists learned that 118 beagles were still stuck inside the facility and the lab's workers were jumping the lab's fences to provide food and water for the dogs. Thanedar claimed that the bank was in charge of taking care of the animals. A volunteer at the shelter who received many of the beagles rescued from the facility said "We believe that they have never been outside, ever. I don't think they've actually had their paws on the grass. When I walked in here it looked like they were walking on eggshells. They were kind of afraid to walk on the grass."

A few days later, 55 long-tailed macaques were rescued by California-based organization In Defense of Animals. Primarily Primates Sanctuary, who received 25 male Java macaque monkeys, stated that they looked pale and thin when they arrived at the sanctuary, and the stress had led many of them to pull out some of their hair.

=== Herbal supplement with Viagra ===
Joel Crookston, a quality assurance manager at Thanedar's Ann Arbor-based Avomeen Analytical Services quit in 2014 after Thanedar refused to alert federal regulators about a customer suspected of illegally spiking a male "herbal supplement" with prescription Viagra. Crookston told a state assistant attorney general he went around Thanedar and personally reported his concerns to the Food and Drug Administration (FDA). An analytical chemist told the Detroit News he recalled Crookston saying multiple times he was going into Thanedar's office to discuss the herbal supplement and seeing him do so.

An FDA report was later released confirming the presence of the undeclared ingredient and warning against using the supplement because it "may interact with nitrates found in some prescription drugs such as nitroglycerin and may lower blood pressure to dangerous levels". Later that year the FDA conducted its own chemical analysis and issued a warning to the supplement's parent company that it contained the undeclared ingredient and therefore must be treated as prescription medication.

Thanedar "denied any memory of the herbal supplement or customer in question", but stated that it was his obligation to test the drugs and inform his clients of the rules, not to inform the federal government about client misconduct.

=== Business fraud lawsuit and settlement ===
After Thanedar sold Avomeen in 2016, a federal lawsuit alleged that he made "fraudulent and misleading" claims to inflate the value of the company in a deal that netted him roughly $20 million. The complaint alleged that Thanedar personally directed employees to smooth over volatile revenue growth in the months leading up to the sale, and instructed bookkeeping staff to back date invoices so revenue could be recognized in prior months to suggest a more stable income stream. Thanedar denied the accusations, but later settled for an undisclosed amount four days before the trial was to start.

=== Political reputation ===
In 2023 HuffPost reported that in Thanedar's first year in Congress, he "has gained a reputation for vanity in an institution powered by the stuff, burning through staff at a rapid clip, alienating his fellow members and spending taxpayer funds on what some people with knowledge of his office view as naked self-promotion". Thanedar's ability to self-fund his own campaigns ($9.1 million in 2022 and $5.3 million in 2024) has helped insulate him from the criticism he has received from political peers in Michigan, including from Michigan Secretary of State Jocelyn Benson, (Note: In a message endorsing Thanedar's primary challenger in 2024, Jocelyn Benson said "I think Shri has a very big heart. But this is about the work.") U.S. Rep. Rashida Tlaib, (Note: Rashida Tlaib was quoted by HuffPost saying "[Thanedar] isn't putting in the work of a public servant and is leaving his working-class communities across his district with no real advocate.") former U.S. Rep. Brenda Lawrence, (Note: Former U.S. Rep. Brenda Lawrence said "Shri's learning curve seems to be extreme, and public service doesn't mean just showing up in the chamber to vote," added Lawrence, who says she doesn't see Thanedar tackling issues that matter the most to Detroiters, such as education and infrastructure." She also said of his self-promoting behavior in congress "This is not a publicity contest. This is a thing we call government.") state senator Darrin Camilleri, (Note: State Senator Darrin Camilleri posted on his official Twitter account in a response about Thanedar's poor constituent services "Can confirm. If I have federal issues in his district from our shared constituents I call @RashidaTlaib or @RepDebDingell 🤷‍♂️) former state senator Adam Hollier, (Note: State Senator Adam Hollier said "Whether it's because [Thanedar's] vast fortune has made him out of touch with working people, or because he simply isn't up to the job, the lack of results are the same. He hasn't shown up, hasn't spoken up, and hasn't delivered.") and Wayne County executive Warren Evans. (Note: In a message endorsing Thanedar's primary challenger in 2024, Warren Evans said "His absence of involvement in the county, his absence of involvement in any form you can think of other than the two times that we saw each other [in 2023] just convinced me that we need to be about the business of electing a [new] congressperson.")

=== Malleable political beliefs ===
Congressional colleagues and former staff were quoted by HuffPost criticizing Thanedar for his "malleable political beliefs" that have shifted when politically expedient, such as his conversations with consultants before his run for governor about whether he should campaign as a Democrat or a Republican. Analysis of his past campaign contributions also showed donations to both parties, including the 2008 Presidential campaign of Senator John McCain.

=== Spending public funds for self-promotion ===
In the months leading up to the 2024 primary election, Detroit News reported that Thanedar had spent public taxpayer funds on $789,000 in TV ads and $40,000 in radio ads, plus an undetermined amount on five billboards and half a dozen mailers. In 2023, Thanedar spent 29% of his office's budget on advertisements, compared to the congressional average of 5%.

=== Toxic work environment ===
Former staffers said Thanedar's congressional office is a toxic work environment, leading to understaffing and high staff turnover. In his first year in Congress, Thanedar went through three different chiefs of staff, and the office only had six or seven permanent staff instead of the more typical 15-18 staffers for a House lawmaker. Thanedar spent 38% of his House budget in that first year on staff pay, while the average House member spent 78%. U.S. Rep. Rashida Tlaib, who represents the neighboring district, has publicly criticized Thanedar multiple times because his constituents contact her office when they cannot get support from Thanedar, saying "he isn't putting in the work of a public servant and is leaving his working-class communities across his district with no real advocate." Thanedar relies on interns to take on the work of more experienced and higher paid staffers. A former staffer also described being fired in the presence of an intern, an experience they found demoralizing and also emblematic of what it was like working for him.

=== Publicity stunts ===
Colleagues have called some of his bills self-serving publicity stunts, such as his Articles of Impeachment against Trump that he introduced the same day that a 2026 primary challenger announced his campaign. Democratic colleagues in the House of Representatives were quoted anonymously as saying "This is the dumbest fucking thing. Utterly selfish behavior," and "a waste of fucking time" since it was extremely unlikely to go anywhere in the Republican controlled House. Democratic House minority leader Hakeem Jeffries said it would be almost impossible for a similar impeachment effort of Pete Hegseth to see the House floor. "This is not a publicity contest. This is a thing we call government," said former U.S. Rep. Brenda Lawrence.

== Personal life ==
In 1984, Thanedar married his first wife, Shamal. The couple had two sons: Neil (born 1988) and Samir (born 1992) and were married until Shamal's death in 1996. In his 2004 memoir, Thanedar revealed that Shamal had died by suicide.

In 1999, Thanedar married his current wife, Shashi. He is an adherent of Hinduism.

In 2024, Thanedar produced, funded, and acted in a short film, Dear Pra, recounting Shamal's secret struggle with depression, in a bid to raise awareness about mental health issues and to tackle the stigma and shame that was "certainly prevalent in South Asian communities".

== Autobiographies ==
Thanedar has written two autobiographies. ही 'श्री' ची इच्छा! (Transliteration: Hī Śrī Cī Icchā; English: This is Shri's Wish) is an autobiography in Marathi, published in 2004. In 2008, Thanedar self-published his memoirs in English, The Blue Suitcase: Tragedy and Triumph in an Immigrant's Life.

== See also ==
- List of Asian Americans and Pacific Islands Americans in the United States Congress
- Asian Americans in politics

U.S. House of Representatives
Preceded by Rashida Tlaib	Member of the U.S. House Representatives from Michigan's 13th congressional district 2023–present	Incumbent
U.S. order of precedence (ceremonial)
Preceded by Emilia Sykes	United States representatives by seniority 351st	Succeeded by Jill Tokuda
