= John Olumba =

American politician (born 1981)

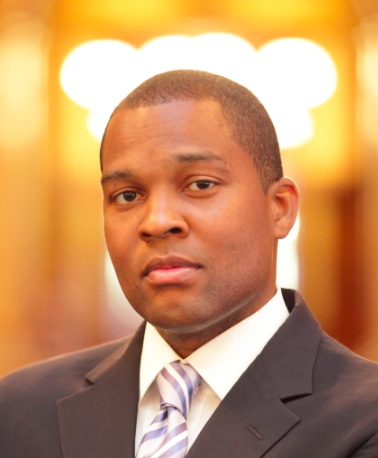

Member of the Michigan House of Representatives
- In office January 1, 2011 – December 31, 2014
- Preceded by: Bert Johnson
- Succeeded by: Wendell Byrd
- Constituency: 5th district (2011–2012); 3rd district (2013–2014)

Personal details
- Born: July 12, 1981 (age 45) Detroit, Michigan, U.S.
- Party: Democratic (until 2013); Independent (2013–present)
- Spouse: Charsha
- Children: 4
- Education: University of Michigan (BA); Northern Illinois University College of Law (JD); UCL Faculty of Laws
- Profession: Politician
- Website: johnolumba.com

John Olumba (born July 12, 1981) is an American lawyer and politician who served as an independent and Democrat in the Michigan State House of Representatives. He represented the 3rd house district located in Wayne County, which comprises the north central and eastern portions of Detroit. After serving on the House Judiciary, Commerce, Economic Development and Trade, Insurance, and Criminal Justice committees, Olumba served on the House Appropriations Committee as the chairman of Fiscal Oversight, and as a member on Community Health, and Corrections.

== Early life, college, law school ==
Olumba was born in Detroit. He attended Miller Middle School, a school popularized by other well known politicians in Detroit such as Coleman Young and Erma Henderson. Olumba attended high school at (Lewis) Cass Technical High School in Detroit and is a graduate of the University of Michigan with dual concentrations in economics and political science. He earned his Juris Doctor degree from Northern Illinois University College of Law and studied at the University College of London Faculty of Laws.

== Family and personal life ==
John Olumba and Charsha Mauldin were married in 2008. They have had eight children together. He is also a preacher of the gospel.

== Legislative career ==
=== Investigations into Wayne County Executive ===
As a representative, Olumba's notoriety increased after formally initiating a federal investigation into the offices of Wayne County Executive Robert Ficano and reports of backlash surfaced. Olumba said he received threatening phone calls and elected officials visited him at his home uninvited in order to coerce him into retracting his investigation. Olumba said two of his Democratic colleagues handed him a retraction letter on the floor of the House of Representatives that he eventually handed over to federal authorities. Thus far, the investigation has yielded two indictments and one conviction.

Toward the end of his first term, Olumba also sought an investigation by the Michigan Attorney General into Detroit Mayor Dave Bing over money he said was misappropriated from two city departments.

=== Chairman of Fiscal Oversight Committee ===
In 2014 Olumba earned the chairmanship over the house appropriations subcommittee of fiscal oversight. Historically, it is the first time a representative not in the majority party maintained a chairmanship of a committee.

=== State Representative: 2010–2012 ===
In August 2010, Olumba won the state's most crowded primary with 16 people seeking office by a 2 to 1 margin over the closest competitor. Olumba was elected in November 2010 in a landslide victory to serve in the 96th legislature of the State of Michigan.

Olumba caused controversy within the Michigan House Democratic Caucus when he accused the caucus of allowing the Emergency Manager Law Public Act 4 to pass with immediate effect when they could have blocked its passage by engaging in a filibuster. Olumba is also known for his introduction of a series of bills he named the Detroit Reinvestment and Restructuring Omnibus designed to revitalize the city. It is the largest bill package intended for the municipality in history.

Olumba served on the House Judiciary and Commerce Committees in addition to a special subcommittee on Economic Development and Trade.

=== State Representative: Second Term ===
In his first term, Olumba represented the 5th house district which also included the cities of Highland Park and Hamtramck. Olumba was redistricted into the 3rd district and, following a contentious primary election in which Olumba defeated another incumbent, Olumba won the general with 96 percent of the vote. The 3rd district is the only entirely Detroit house district.

On February 19, 2013, Olumba became an independent, citing the lack of an urban or African American agenda by the Michigan House Democrats. Olumba argued that Detroit is the highest tax entity in the state yet, there are no African Americans or Detroiters on the Tax Policy Committee and they are underrepresented on the Appropriations Committee.

== Electoral history ==
2010 General Election – Michigan's 5th State House of Representatives District 2 Year Term (1) Position
Party	Candidate	Votes	%	±%
Democratic	John Olumba	11,763	89.71	0.0
Republican	Jermaine Jones	779	5.94	0.0

2012 General Election – Michigan's 3rd state House of Representatives District 2 Year Term (1) Position
Party	Candidate	Votes	%	±%
Democratic	John Olumba	33,938	95.56	0.0
Republican	Dolores Brodersen	1,029	2.90	0.0
