= Casmer P. Ogonowski =

American politician from Michigan

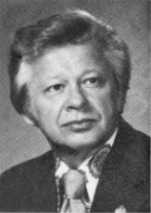

Member of the Michigan House of Representatives
- In office January 1, 1969 – March 15, 1982
- Preceded by: Anthony C. Licata
- Succeeded by: Clem Bykowski
- Constituency: 19th district (1969–1972); 3rd district (1973–1982)

Personal details
- Born: March 4, 1923 Detroit, Michigan
- Died: January 10, 2012 (aged 88)
- Party: Democratic

Casmer P. Ogonowski (March 4, 1923 – January 10, 2012) was an American politician.

Born in Detroit, Michigan, Ogonowski served in the Michigan House of Representatives from 1969 until his resignation in 1982. He was a Democrat and Chairman of the state Liquor Control Commission. He was found guilty of two counts of extortion for demanding a $2000 bribe from a Detroit store owner in exchange for a liquor license and a lottery station. He was found guilty and sentenced to three years in prison. Convicted felons are not allowed to serve in the legislature, so he resigned his seat in March 1982.
