= LaMar Lemmons Jr. =

American politician (1936–2023)

Member of the Michigan House of Representatives
- In office 2005–2010

Personal details
- Born: June 23, 1936 Memphis, Tennessee, U.S.
- Died: November 7, 2023 (aged 87)
- Party: Democratic
- Children: 4, including LaMar
- Education: Detroit Institute of Technology
- Occupation: Politician, businessman

Military service
- Allegiance: United States
- Branch/service: United States Air Force

LaMar Lemmons Jr. (June 23, 1936 – November 7, 2023) was an American businessman and politician who was a Democratic member of the Michigan State House of Representatives from 2005 to 2010.

== Life ==
Lemmons was born in Memphis, Tennessee, where he lived until he moved to Detroit in 1950. He attended Detroit Public schools until he enlisted in the Air Force. Lemmons served at Ashiya Air Force Base in Japan. He attended the Detroit Institute of Technology. He worked for the Ford Motor Company until he founded his own business, Lemmons Transportation.

Lemmons had four children, including former Rep. LaMar Lemmons III. Lemmons died on November 7, 2023, at the age of 87.

In 2009 he supported legislation to make the Detroit Board of Education into a department of the government of the City of Detroit.

== Electoral history ==
- 2006 campaign for State House
  - LaMar Lemmons Jr. (D), 96%
  - Edith Floyd (R), 4%
- 2004 campaign for State House
  - LaMar Lemmons Jr. (D), 95%
  - Edith Floyd (R), 5%
