= Ithaca Public Schools =

School district in Michigan

Address
- 250 E. Tuttle Road Ithaca, Gratiot County, Michigan, 48847; United States

District information
- Grades: PreKindergarten–12
- Superintendent: Steven Netzley
- Schools: 3
- Budget: $16,340,000 2022-2023 expenditures
- NCES District ID: 2619580

Students and staff
- Students: 971 (2024-2025)
- Teachers: 58 (on an FTE basis) (2024-2025)
- Staff: 128 FTE (2024-2025)
- Student–teacher ratio: 16.74 (2024-2025)

Other information
- Website: www.ithacaschools.net

Ithaca Public Schools is a public school district in Gratiot County, in Central Michigan. It serves Ithaca and parts of the townships of Arcada, Elba, Emerson, Fulton, Hamilton, Lafayette, Newark, New Haven, North Star, Sumner, and Washington.

== History ==
The former junior/senior high school was built in 1872. North Elementary was built next to it in 1952.

The current Ithaca Junior/Senior High School was dedicated on October 24, 1965. South Elementary opened the same year. Demolition of the old school began the day after the last day of school in 1965.

== Schools ==
Schools in Ithaca Public Schools district
School	Address	Notes
Ithaca Junior/Senior High School	710 N Union Street, Ithaca	Grades 7–12. Built 1965.
Ithaca North Elementary	201 E Arcada Street, Ithaca	Grades 3-6. Built 1952.
Ithaca South Elementary	400 Webster Street, Ithaca	Grades PreK-2. Built 1965.
