= List of Michigan State Historic Sites in Gratiot County =

Location of Gratiot County in Michigan

The following is a list of Michigan State Historic Sites in Gratiot County, Michigan. Sites marked with a dagger (†) are also listed on the National Register of Historic Places in Gratiot County, Michigan.

== Current listings ==
Name	Image	Location	City	Listing date
Alma College Informational Designation		700 block West Superior Street	Alma	March 18, 1961
Alma Downtown Historic District		Superior Street	Alma	November 21, 1975
Alma Sugar Company Office Building and Seed House	Alma Sugar Company Office Building	200 North Court (Office Building) and 217 North Court (Seed House)	Alma	January 20, 1984
Bethany Mission Cemetery		Riverside Drive north of McGregory Road	Bethany Township	January 17, 1986
Drake House	Drake House	328 East Saginaw Street	Breckenridge	2009
Gratiot Center Historical Village Barn	Gratiot Center Historical Village Barn	South Pine River Street	Ithaca	September 11, 1979
Gratiot County Courthouse†	Gratiot County Courthouse	Center Street, Courthouse Square	Ithaca	September 15, 1957
Jackson-Weller House	Jackson-Weller House	129 W Center Street	Ithaca	January 16, 1990
John Jeffery House	John Jeffery House	225 West Center Street	Ithaca	August 12, 1983
Stiles Kennedy House	Stiles Kennedy House	310 West Washington Street	St. Louis	March 21, 1991
James H. and Sarah W. Lancashire House	James H. and Sarah W. Lancashire House	633 North State Street	Alma	March 28, 1985
Lumberjack & Riverdrivers Association Park		Lumberjack Road, about 1.5 miles N of M-46	Seville	January 11, 1982
Dr. Charles H. MacLachlan Sanitarium and House†	Dr. Charles MacLachlan House	6482 Pingree Road	Elwell	January 8, 1981
Michigan Masonic Home	Michigan Masonic Home	1200 Wright Avenue	Alma	May 21, 1985
Michigan's Petroleum Industry Informational Designation		Roadside rest area southbound US-27, north of Alma	Alma	January 19, 1957
Henry Pattengill Monument	Henry Pattingill Monument	NE Corner of West Center and North Maple	Ithaca	2011
Kosciusko P. Peet House	Kosciusko P. Peet House	228 West Center Street	Ithaca	September 21, 1983
Saginaw and Gratiot County State Road/Saginaw Valley and Saint Louis Railroad Commemorative Designation		Breckenridge Village Park, opposite 124 E Saginaw Street	Breckenridge	April 18, 1996
Second Presbyterian Church of Lafayette		8026 East Street / Charles Road	Lafayette Township	July 17, 1981
Sumner Grist and Flour Mill (Demolished)		Mill Street	Sumner	March 2, 1976
Alfred Wasson Round Barn (Destroyed in a storm in 1998)		1982 S Begole Road	Ithaca vicinity	January 27, 1983
A.W. Wright House	A.W. Wright House	503 North State Street	Alma	July 29, 1980

== See also ==
- National Register of Historic Places listings in Gratiot County, Michigan

== Sources ==
- Historic Sites Online – Gratiot County. Michigan State Housing Developmental Authority. Accessed January 23, 2011.
