= Fulton Schools =

School district in Michigan, United States

Address
- 8060 Ely Highway Middleton, Gratiot County, Michigan, 48856; United States

District information
- Grades: PreKindergarten–12
- Superintendent: Thomas Torok
- Schools: 3
- Budget: $14,037,000 2022–2023 expenditures
- NCES District ID: 2615420

Students and staff
- Students: 553 (2024–2025)
- Teachers: 34.26 (on an FTE basis) (2024–2025)
- Staff: 71.18 FTE (2024–2025)
- Student–teacher ratio: 16.14 (2024–2025)
- District mascot: Pirates

Other information
- Website: www.fultonpirates.net

Fulton Schools is a public school district in Central Michigan. In Gratiot County, it serves Perrinton and parts of the townships of Fulton, Newark, New Haven, North Shade, and Washington. In Clinton County, it serves Maple Rapids and parts of Essex and Lebanon townships.

== History ==
Middleton and Perrinton school districts merged in 1940 to form Fulton Schools, and Maple River's school district joined in 1958. Before the current middle/high school's completion, high school was held at a brick school in Perrinton.

The current middle/high school was dedicated on January 22, 1961. Fulton Elementary, originally a middle school, opened around 1975. The school in Perrinton closed in 1983, and its elementary students were moved to the middle school. Eighth grade was moved to the high school building.

In 1993, the middle/high school was remodeled. A new media center, computer labs, and new lockers, paint, carpet, and lighting were added.

== Schools ==
Fulton schools share a campus at 8060 Ely Highway, south of Middleton in Fulton Township.

Schools in Fulton Schools district
School	Notes
Fulton Middle and High School	Grades 6-12
Fulton Elementary	Grades PreK-5
