= Ithaca High School (Michigan) =

Location
- 710 North Union Street; Ithaca, Michigan 48847; United States; 43°18′4″N 84°35′45″W

Information
- School type: Public High School
- School district: Ithaca Public Schools
- Principal: Jim Thompson
- Teaching staff: 24.00 (FTE)
- Grades: 7–12
- Enrollment: 454 (2023–2024)
- Student to teacher ratio: 18.92
- Colors: Blue; Gold
- Athletics conference: Tri-Valley West Athletic Conference
- Nickname: Yellowjackets
- Accreditation: North Central Association
- Website: www.ithacaschools.net/o/ijsh

Ithaca High School is a public high school located in Ithaca, Michigan, United States in central Gratiot County. Serving grades 7 to 12, it is part of the Ithaca Public Schools system and a member of the Tri-Valley West Athletic Conference.

== Demographics ==
The demographic breakdown of the 454 students enrolled in 2023-24 was:

- Male - 52.9%
- Female - 47.1%
- Native American/Alaskan - 0.2%
- Asian/Pacific islanders - 0.2%
- Black - 0.2%
- Hispanic - 8.1%
- White - 89.4%
- Multiracial - 1.8%

35.2% of the students were eligible for free or reduced lunch.

== Academics ==
Ithaca High School is accredited by the North Central Association. Advanced Placement courses are offered in U.S. history, world history and English literature. Additional AP courses are available online through Michigan Virtual High School Ithaca High School is known for its academic excellence. Its Model United Nations team maintained a streak of 31 consecutive league titles from 1989-2019, extending from its membership in the Central States Activities Association through its membership in the Tri-Valley Conference.

== Athletics ==
Ithaca is a member of the Tri-Valley West Athletic Conference, after leaving the Central State Activities Association prior to the 2006-07 school year.

Ithaca participates in the following sports:

- Wrestling (boys only)
- Basketball
- American football (boys only) (State champions - 2010, 2011, 2012, 2013, 2015)
- Soccer
- Baseball (boys only)
- Softball (girls only)
- Golf (Boys state champions - 1974)
- Track and field (2016 State Champions - girls)
- Cross country (Boys state champions - 1948 Girls state champions - 2014)
- Cheerleading (girls only)
- Bowling (Girls State Champions - 2016)
- Volleyball (girls only)
- Tennis

Ithaca's football team had a 69-game winning streak from 2010 to 2014.

== Notable alumni ==
- Curt Anderson, Christian pop musician
- Chris Patrick, Former NFL and Canadian Football League player
