= Newark, Michigan =

Newark, Michigan may refer to the following places in the U.S. state of Michigan:

- Newark, Gratiot County, Michigan, an unincorporated community in Newark Township
- Newark, Oakland County, Michigan, an unincorporated community in Holly Township
