= Ithaca Downtown Historic District (Ithaca, Michigan) =

Historic district in Michigan, United States

- U.S. National Register of Historic Places
- U.S. Historic district
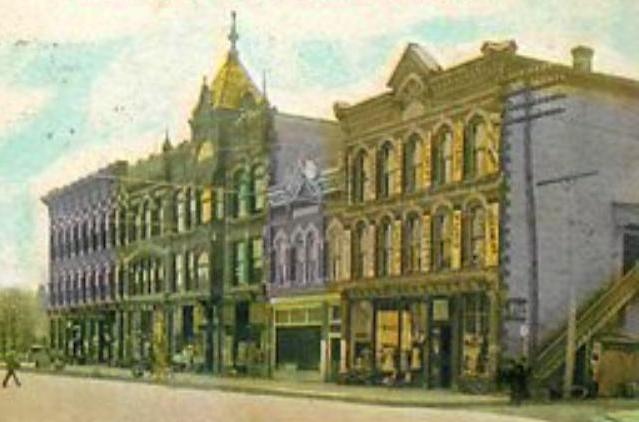
- South side of Center Street

- Location within Michigan Location within the United States
- Interactive map
- Location: 100-168 and 101-161 E. Center St., Ithaca, Michigan
- Coordinates: 43°17′30″N 84°36′24″W
- Area: 4 acres (1.6 ha)
- Built: 1875
- Architect: Oliver M. Hidden
- Architectural style: Late Victorian
- NRHP reference No.: 05001510
- Added to NRHP: December 21, 2005

The Ithaca Downtown Historic District is a commercial historic district located on East Center Street, between Main and Pine River, in Ithaca, Michigan (covering 100-168 and 101-161 East Center Street). It was listed on the National Register of Historic Places in 2005.

== History ==
Ithaca was founded in 1855; development of the new settlement began the next year when it was selected as the county seat of the newly formed Gratiot County. The first commercial enterprise, located just west of this district, was John Jeffery's store, built in 1856. In 1860 a hotel was built at the corner of Main and Center (within this district), and by 1869 the block was filled with one- to three- story wooden commercial buildings. Ithaca was incorporated as a village in 1869. In the 1870s, brick buildings were constructed in the district; the first one being the 1875 Richardson & Weatherwax grocery store.

In 1882 a railroad was built into the village. This spurred both agricultural development in the surrounding area, but also industrial development in Ithaca itself. Fires in 1888 and 1890 destroyed some of the earlier wooden buildings which were replaced with brick. A 1905 fire destroyed the last of the earlier wooden buildings, and a new building was erected the following year. Except for the 1920s-era gas station, and a 1988 building erected on the site of a 1987 fire which destroyed one of the historic buildings, the Ithaca Downtown Historic District looks much as it did in 1906.

== Description ==
The district includes 20 buildings, 18 of which were constructed in the 1875-1906 period. The buildings are predominantly red brick Late Victorian structures, and stand side-by-side in a single block along Center Street. The block is divided by a narrow alley running perpendicular to Center, separating each side of the street into two halves.

The largest commercial building in the district, the three-story, three-storefront J. Jeffery & Sons Block, stands at the southwest corner of Center and Main Streets. Three more commercial buildings stand next to the Jeffery Block, spanning the space to the alley. These three buildings exhibit interesting contrasting designs, with massive rockface fieldstone masonryon one, pointy stone "Gothic" incised window caps and a finial-capped metal cornice on another, and mixed red and yellow-buff brickwork on the third. On the north side of the street, a former gas station stands at the corner, followed by a row of two-story buildings, running west to the alley. These buildings exhibit a broad variety of architectural styles in 1890s commercial buildings, with different types and shapes of brick, brickwork piers, and brick paneling in various shapes. Many use terra cotta, and exhibit a variety of window shapes and sizes.

West of the alley on the south side is a 1988 building constructed in a style that complements its neighbors. Nearby is another Late Victorian three-storefront block, with an elaborate bracketed iron cornice. On the north side of the street, four buildings west of the alley retain a generally high degree of integrity. The first building is the oldest in the district, dating from 1875. It has Gothic-arch second-story windows with paneled brickwork, and retains its original iron storefront columns. Next door is a stone-front building with narrow windows.

== Gallery ==
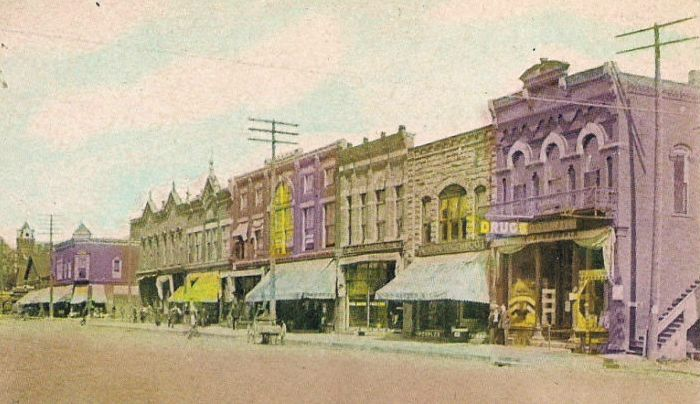
North side of Center Street

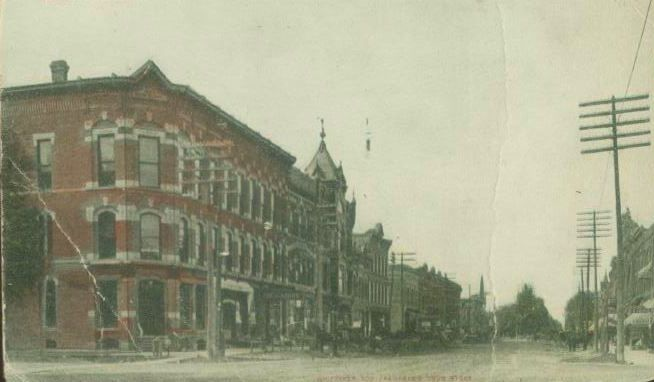
Center Street looking west
