= Gratiot County Courthouse =

- U.S. National Register of Historic Places
- Michigan State Historic Site
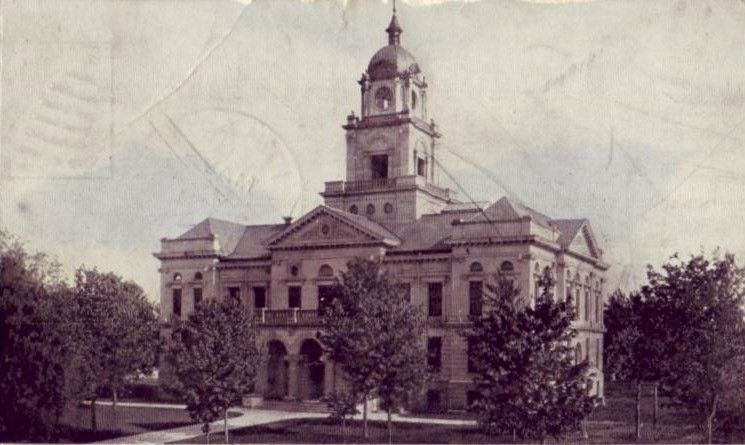
- Courthouse shown on ca. 1908 postcard

- Location within Michigan Location within the United States
- Interactive map showing the location for Gratiot County Courthouse
- Location: 214 E. Center St., Ithaca, Michigan
- Coordinates: 43°17′27″N 84°36′17″W
- Area: 2 acres (0.81 ha)
- Built: 1900
- Built by: A. W. Mohnke
- Architect: Claire Allen
- Architectural style: Neoclassical
- NRHP reference No.: 76002291

Significant dates
- Added to NRHP: January 31, 1976
- Designated MSHS: September 15, 1957

The Gratiot County Courthouse is a government building located at 214 East Center Street in Ithaca, Michigan. It was designated a Michigan State Historic Site in 1957 and listed on the National Register of Historic Places in 1976.

== History ==
Gratiot County was first laid out in 1831, but settlement did not begin until 1843, when a Lutheran mission was set up near the current location of St. Louis. The county government was organized in 1856, and Gratiot Center was chosen as the county seat. A two-story log cabin, built by local settler John Jeffrey that same year, was used as the first courthouse. The following year, "Gratiot Center" was renamed "Ithaca," as it remains today. An additional office building was constructed in 1861, and in 1870 the original courthouse was replaced with a 36-by-60-foot (11 m × 18 m) frame structure.

In 1900, voters approved the construction of a stone courthouse. Plans were drawn by Jackson-based architect Claire Allen, and the cornerstone was laid in September 1900. However, work soon stopped as the contractor demanded more money, and lawsuits were initiated by the county and by the contractor's bondsmen. The issue was soon resolved, and construction resumed, this time by A. W. Mohnke of Grand Rapids. The final cost of construction was $75,000. A clock was added to the clock tower in 1905.

In 1978, a fire caused substantial damage to the second floor. In the 1990s, an additional "connector building" was constructed, and renovations were made to the 1902 courthouse. The courthouse is still used for county offices and court proceedings.

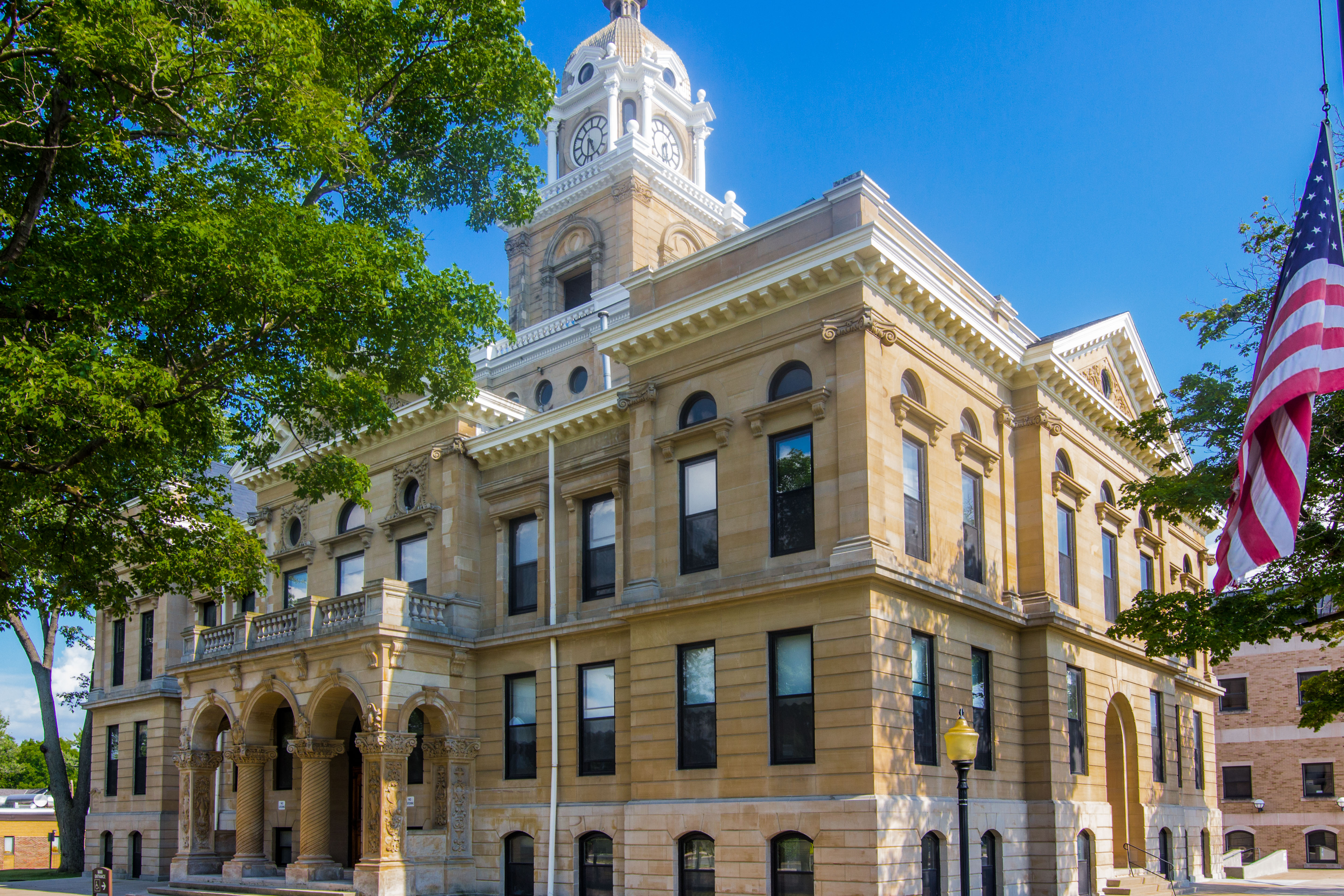
Gratiot County Courthouse

== Description ==
The Gratiot County Courthouse is a 2 1/2-story Neoclassical structure covered in beige sandstone. The building measures 36 by 60 feet (11 m × 18 m). It sits on a half-basement and has a distinctive multi-stage clock tower topped with a belfry. The front entrance is surrounded by an unusual decorative arched and twisted column. The interior is anchored by a central rotunda, and is dominated by oak and marble.

The building is in relatively original condition, with few alterations.
