= Bethany Township, Michigan =

- Civil township
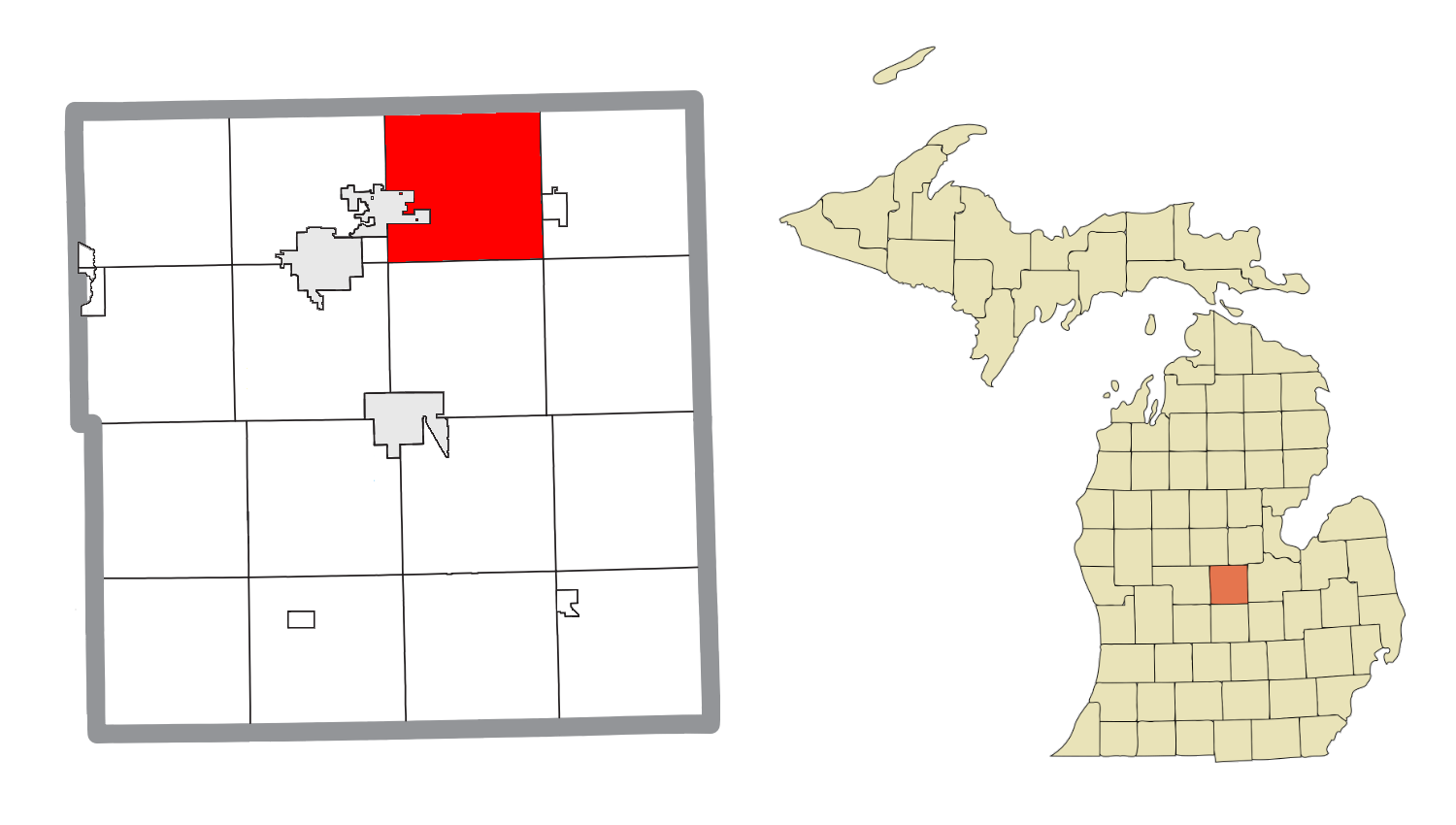
- Location within Gratiot County

- Location within the state of Michigan Location within the United States
- Coordinates: 43°25′34″N 84°32′35″W
- Country: United States
- State: Michigan
- County: Gratiot

Area
  - Total: 35.2 sq mi (91.2 km^{2})
  - Land: 35.2 sq mi (91.1 km^{2})
  - Water: 0 sq mi (0.0 km^{2})
- Elevation: 720 ft (220 m)

Population (2020)
  - Total: 1,773
  - Density: 50.4/sq mi (19.5/km^{2})
- Time zone: UTC-5 (Eastern (EST))
  - Summer (DST): UTC-4 (EDT)
- FIPS code: 26-08020
- GNIS feature ID: 1625930
- Website: https://www.bethanytownshipmi.gov/

Bethany Township is a civil township of Gratiot County in the U.S. state of Michigan. As of the 2020 census, the township population was 1,773, up from 1,407 in 2010.

== History ==
A Lutheran mission aimed at reaching the Ojibwe was established here in 1847 by Edward R. Baierlein. The mission lasted until 1857 when the Ojibwe were relocated to Isabella County, Michigan. Bethany Township was organized in 1858.

== Communities ==
- The city of St. Louis is at the western edge of the township, but is administratively autonomous.
- The village of Breckenridge is on the eastern boundary within neighboring Wheeler Township.

== Geography ==
According to the United States Census Bureau, the township has a total area of 35.2 square miles (91 km^{2}), of which 35.2 square miles (91 km^{2}) is land and 0.03% is water.

== Demographics ==
As of the census of 2000, there were 3,492 people, 518 households, and 395 families residing in the township. The population density was 99.2 inhabitants per square mile (38.3/km^{2}). There were 543 housing units at an average density of 15.4 per square mile (5.9/km^{2}). The racial makeup of the township was 64.63% White, 29.47% African American, 1.32% Native American, 0.54% Asian, 0.06% Pacific Islander, 1.46% from other races, and 2.52% from two or more races. Hispanic or Latino of any race were 3.87% of the population.

There were 518 households, out of which 35.5% had children under the age of 18 living with them, 68.1% were married couples living together, 5.2% had a female householder with no husband present, and 23.6% were non-families. 18.9% of all households were made up of individuals, and 10.2% had someone living alone who was 65 years of age or older. The average household size was 2.73 and the average family size was 3.13.

In the township the population was spread out, with 10.9% under the age of 18, 13.0% from 18 to 24, 51.3% from 25 to 44, 19.0% from 45 to 64, and 5.7% who were 65 years of age or older. The median age was 34 years. For every 100 females, there were 399.6 males. For every 100 females age 18 and over, there were 494.6 males.

The median income for a household in the township was $43,177, and the median income for a family was $48,942. Males had a median income of $27,044 versus $23,750 for females. The per capita income for the township was $15,177. About 5.7% of families and 7.6% of the population were below the poverty line, including 10.8% of those under age 18 and 7.9% of those age 65 or over.
