= North Shade Township, Michigan =

- Civil township
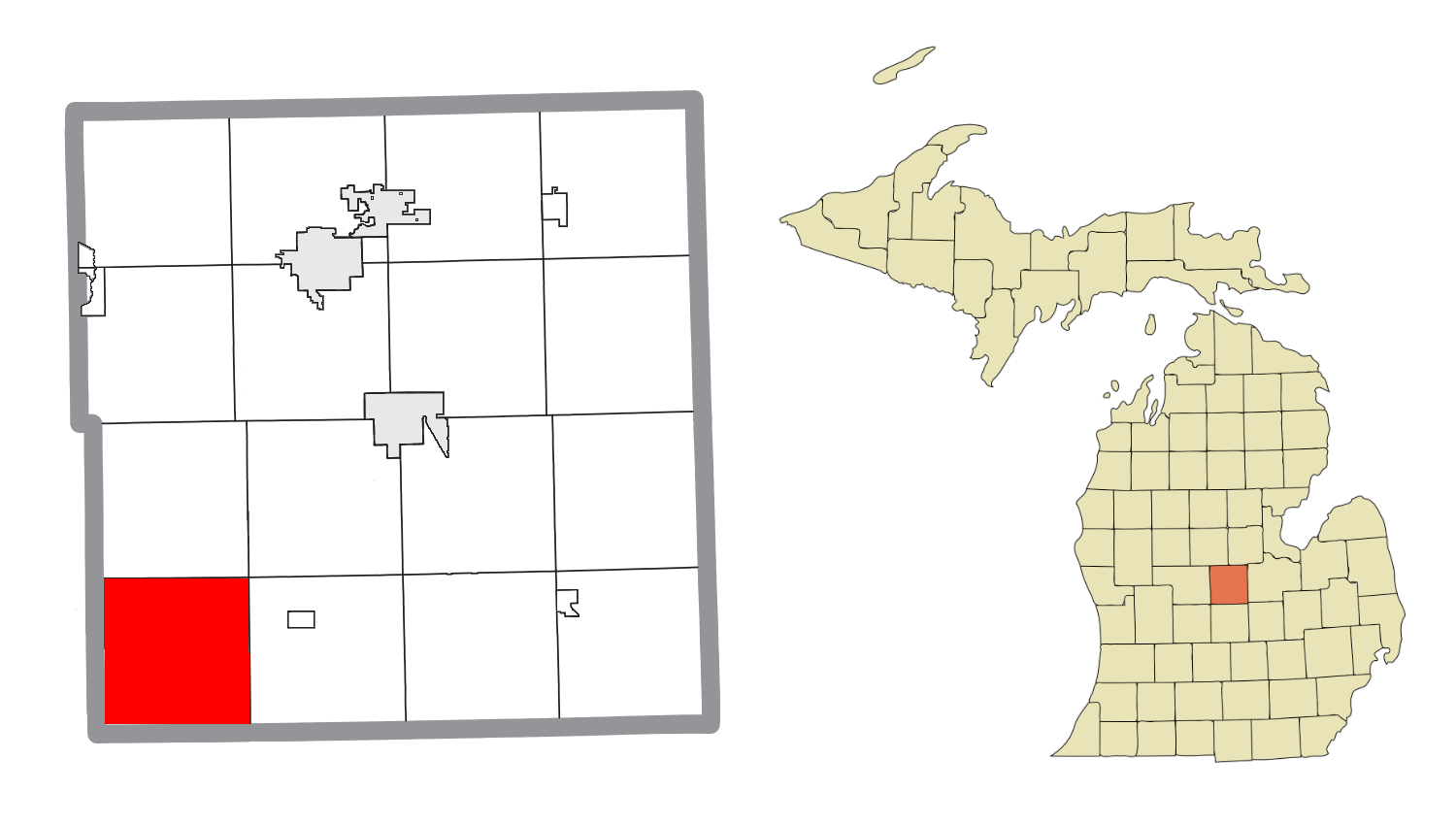
- Location within Gratiot County

- Location within the state of Michigan Location within the United States
- Coordinates: 43°10′10″N 84°45′58″W
- Country: United States
- State: Michigan
- County: Gratiot

Area
  - Total: 35.6 sq mi (92.2 km^{2})
  - Land: 35.6 sq mi (92.2 km^{2})
  - Water: 0 sq mi (0.0 km^{2})
- Elevation: 750 ft (230 m)

Population (2020)
  - Total: 558
  - Density: 15.7/sq mi (6.05/km^{2})
- Time zone: UTC-5 (Eastern (EST))
  - Summer (DST): UTC-4 (EDT)
- FIPS code: 26-58800
- GNIS feature ID: 1626815

North Shade Township is a civil township of Gratiot County in the U.S. state of Michigan. The population was 558 at the 2020 census.

== Geography ==
According to the United States Census Bureau, the township has a total area of 35.6 square miles (92 km^{2}), of which 35.6 square miles (92 km^{2}) is land and 0.03% is water.

== Demographics ==
As of the census of 2000, there were 706 people, 237 households, and 196 families residing in the township. The population density was 19.8 per square mile (7.7/km^{2}). There were 260 housing units at an average density of 7.3 per square mile (2.8/km^{2}). The racial makeup of the township was 98.30% White, 0.28% from other races, and 1.42% from two or more races. Hispanic or Latino of any race were 1.56% of the population.

There were 237 households, out of which 40.5% had children under the age of 18 living with them, 74.3% were married couples living together, 7.2% had a female householder with no husband present, and 16.9% were non-families. 13.1% of all households were made up of individuals, and 5.5% had someone living alone who was 65 years of age or older. The average household size was 2.98 and the average family size was 3.28.

In the township the population was spread out, with 31.6% under the age of 18, 6.9% from 18 to 24, 27.9% from 25 to 44, 21.5% from 45 to 64, and 12.0% who were 65 years of age or older. The median age was 35 years. For every 100 females, there were 91.8 males. For every 100 females age 18 and over, there were 97.1 males.

The median income for a household in the township was $43,000, and the median income for a family was $50,313. Males had a median income of $32,206 versus $29,375 for females. The per capita income for the township was $19,583. About 3.1% of families and 3.8% of the population were below the poverty line, including 4.3% of those under age 18 and 4.5% of those age 65 or over.
