= Claire Allen =

American architect

- Born: July 29, 1853; Pontiac, Michigan, United States
- Died: December 22, 1942 (aged 89); Jackson, Michigan, United States
- Occupation: Architect

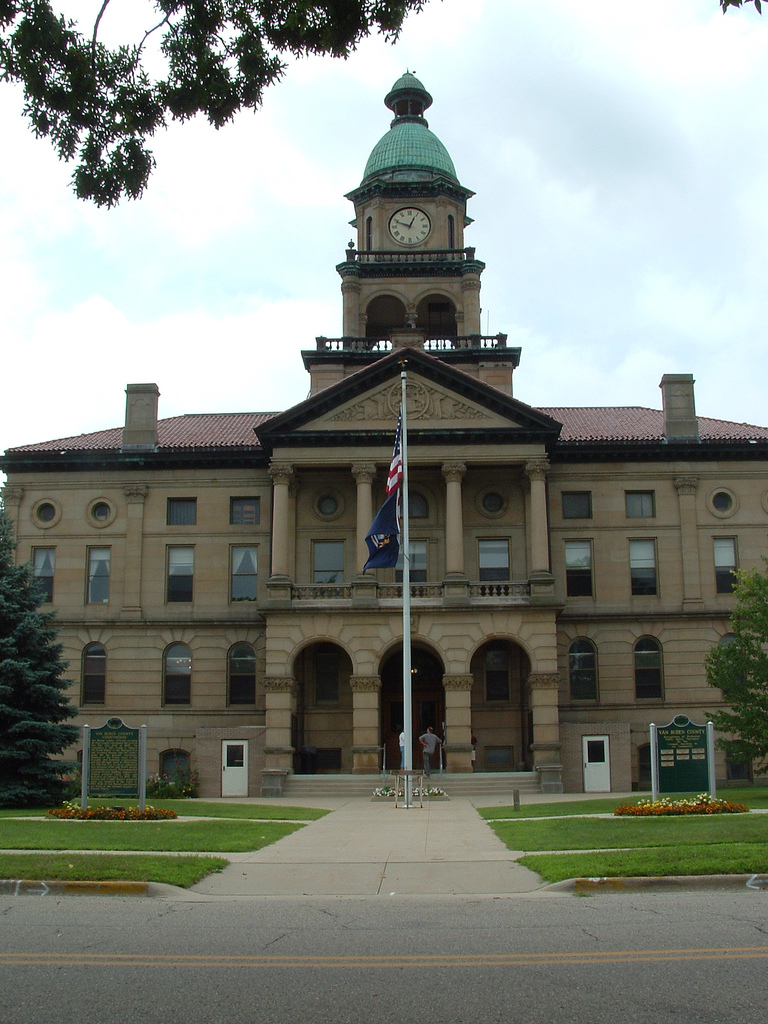
Van Buren County Courthouse in Paw Paw, Michigan

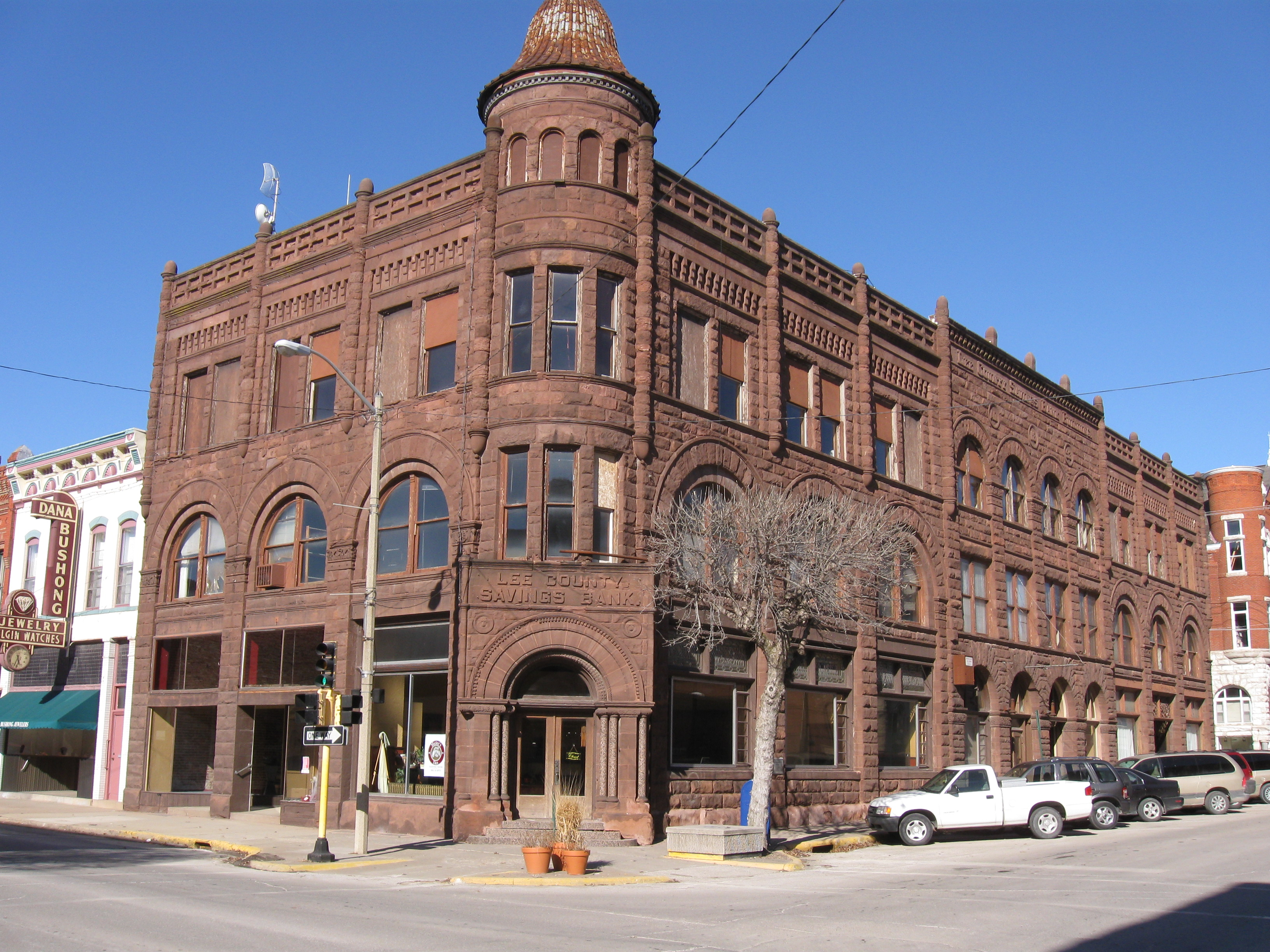
Lee County Savings Bank in Fort Madison, Iowa

Claire Allen (July 29, 1853 – December 22, 1942) was an American architect prominent in southern Michigan in the early twentieth century, and best known for designing several county courthouses. He was considered a "master regional architect".

== Biography ==
Allen's grave at Mount Evergreen Cemetery

Claire Allen was born in Pontiac, Michigan on July 29, 1853. He moved to Jackson as a young man, and practiced architecture there for 52 years. He established the architectural firm of Claire Allen & Sons. Some 100 structures are attributed to him. His firm designed numerous examples of American neoclassical architecture and Colonial Revival buildings in Michigan and Iowa, but had a range that encompassed Beaux-Arts Classical and Jacobean Revival styles as well.

He died at his home in Jackson on December 22, 1942, and was buried at Mount Evergreen Cemetery.

== Works ==
Some buildings designed by Allen include:

Work	Image	Place	Year	Historic	Map	Notes
The Post Office		Jackson, Michigan	1932		Map	Now Consumers Energy's headquarters - Post Office History
Glazier Office Building		Ann Arbor, Michigan			Map	
Armory Building		Ann Arbor, Michigan	1911		Map	
Clock Tower Building		Chelsea, Michigan	1907	State Registered	Map	
Glazier, George P., Memorial Building		Chelsea, Michigan	1901-1902	State Registered	Map	Constructed to house the Chelsea Savings Bank
Methodist Episcopal Church		Chelsea, Michigan	1899		Map	First United Methodist Church - Church History
Welfare Building		Chelsea, Michigan	1906	State Registered	Map	
First National Bank		Corunna, Michigan	1903	State Registered	Map	Now called the Surbeck Building
Hudson Public Library		Hudson, Michigan			Map	
Cascades Manor House		Jackson, Michigan	1929		Map	Cascades Manor House History
Jackson Friendly Home		Jackson, Michigan	1908		Map	Jackson Friendly Home History
Jackson Masonic Temple		Jackson, Michigan	1908	City of Jackson Registered	Map	Currently being renovated for the Jackson School of the Arts - Masonic Temple History
The Ida Stiles Memorial Church		Jackson, Michigan	1895			The Ida Stiles Memorial Church Article
Avon School District No. 5 Schoolhouse		Rochester, Michigan	1889	State Registered	Map	
Hillsdale County Courthouse		Hillsdale County, Michigan	1898-1899	National and State Registered	Map	
Gratiot County Courthouse		Gratiot County, Michigan	1902	National and State Registered	Map	
Ionia County Courthouse		Ionia County, Michigan	1885	National and State Registered	Map	Claire Allen was the contractor on this building
Jackson County Courthouse		Jackson County, Michigan	1927-1928	City of Jackson Registered	Map	Courthouse History
Shiawassee County Courthouse		Shiawassee County, Michigan	1903-1906	National and State Registered	Map	
Van Buren County Courthouse		Van Buren County, Michigan	1901	National and State Registered	Map	
Paw Paw Library		Paw Paw, Michigan	1920	State Registered	Map	
Mendon Township Library		St. Joseph County, Michigan	1905	State Registered	Map	
Berthold Rummler House		Jackson, Michigan	1904	State Registered	Map	
Lake Odessa Depot		Ionia County, Michigan	1889	State Registered	Map	Also known as Detroit, Lansing and Northern Railway Depot
The Rickman Hotel		Kalamazoo, Michigan	1907-1908	National Registered	Map	
Lee County Savings Bank		Fort Madison, Iowa			Map	Fort Madison Downtown Commercial Historic District
Clinton County Courthouse		Clinton, Iowa	1892-1897		Map	History

== Maps ==
- Claire Allen Buildings in Chelsea, Michigan
- Claire Allen Buildings in Jackson, Michigan
- Claire Allen Buildings in Michigan
- Claire Allen Buildings in Iowa
