= Hamilton Township, Gratiot County, Michigan =

Hamilton Township, Michigan
- Civil township
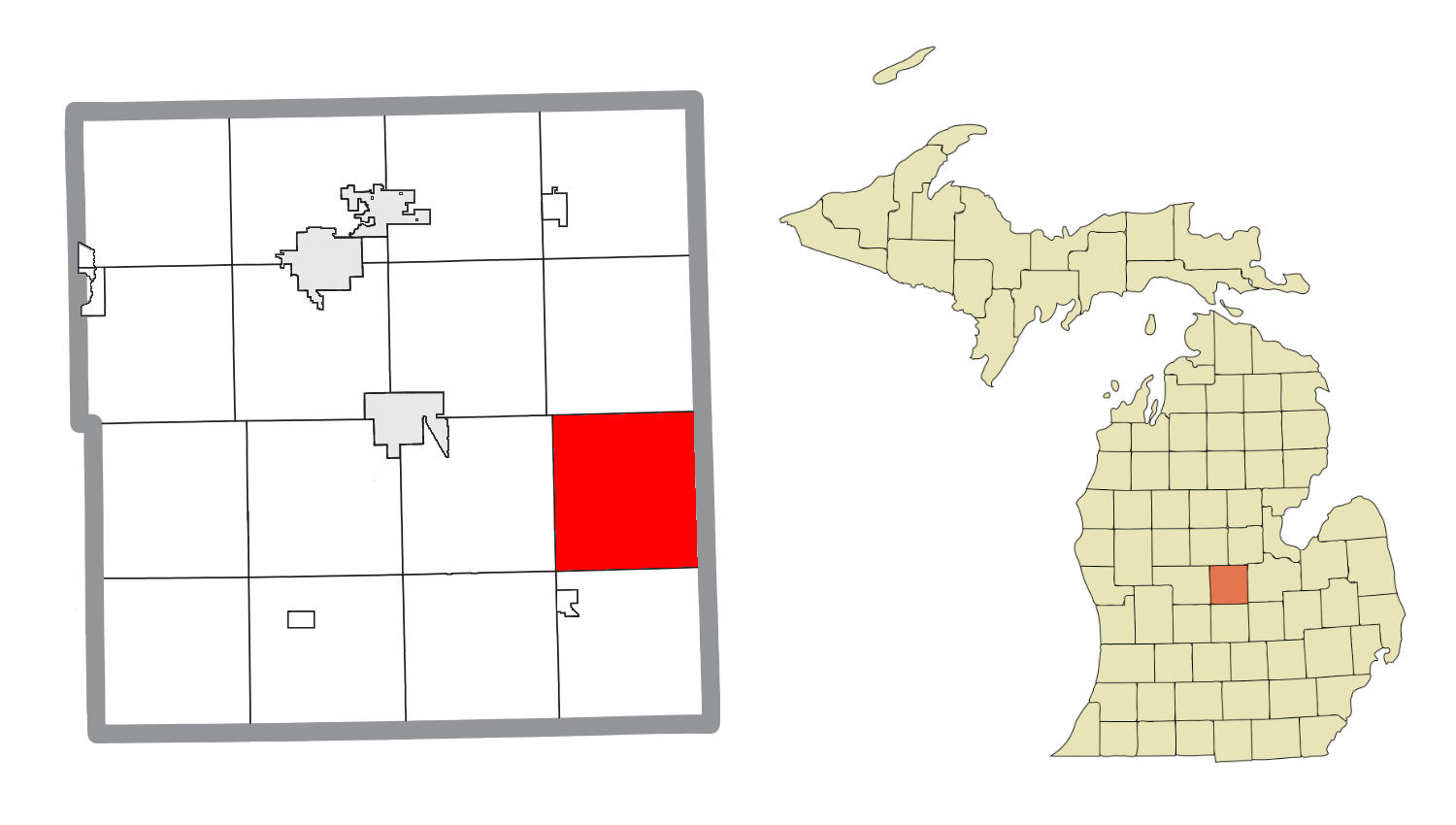
- Location within Gratiot County

- Location within the state of Michigan Location within the United States
- Coordinates: 43°15′8″N 84°26′28″W
- Country: United States
- State: Michigan
- County: Gratiot

Area
  - Total: 34.9 sq mi (90.4 km^{2})
  - Land: 34.9 sq mi (90.3 km^{2})
  - Water: 0.077 sq mi (0.2 km^{2})
- Elevation: 679 ft (207 m)

Population (2020)
  - Total: 427
  - Density: 12.2/sq mi (4.73/km^{2})
- Time zone: UTC-5 (Eastern (EST))
  - Summer (DST): UTC-4 (EDT)
- FIPS code: 26-36160
- GNIS feature ID: 1626422

Hamilton Township is a civil township of Gratiot County in the U.S. state of Michigan. As of the 2020 census, the township population was 427.

== Geography ==
According to the United States Census Bureau, the township has a total area of 34.9 square miles (90 km^{2}), of which 34.8 square miles (90 km^{2}) is land and 0.1 square miles (0.26 km^{2}) (0.20%) is water.

== Demographics ==
As of the census of 2000, there were 491 people, 182 households, and 137 families residing in the township. The population density was 14.1 inhabitants per square mile (5.4/km^{2}). There were 191 housing units at an average density of 5.5 per square mile (2.1/km^{2}). The racial makeup of the township was 97.56% White, 1.22% Native American, 0.41% Asian, 0.20% from other races, and 0.61% from two or more races. Hispanic or Latino of any race were 1.83% of the population.

There were 182 households, out of which 36.3% had children under the age of 18 living with them, 63.2% were married couples living together, 9.3% had a female householder with no husband present, and 24.7% were non-families. 18.7% of all households were made up of individuals, and 10.4% had someone living alone who was 65 years of age or older. The average household size was 2.70 and the average family size was 3.12.

In the township the population was spread out, with 25.7% under the age of 18, 10.0% from 18 to 24, 30.3% from 25 to 44, 20.2% from 45 to 64, and 13.8% who were 65 years of age or older. The median age was 37 years. For every 100 females, there were 99.6 males. For every 100 females age 18 and over, there were 94.1 males.

The median income for a household in the township was $46,607, and the median income for a family was $48,750. Males had a median income of $33,125 versus $26,250 for females. The per capita income for the township was $18,715. None of the families and 3.1% of the population were living below the poverty line, including no under eighteens and 9.0% of those over 64.
