= Emerson Township, Michigan =

- Civil township
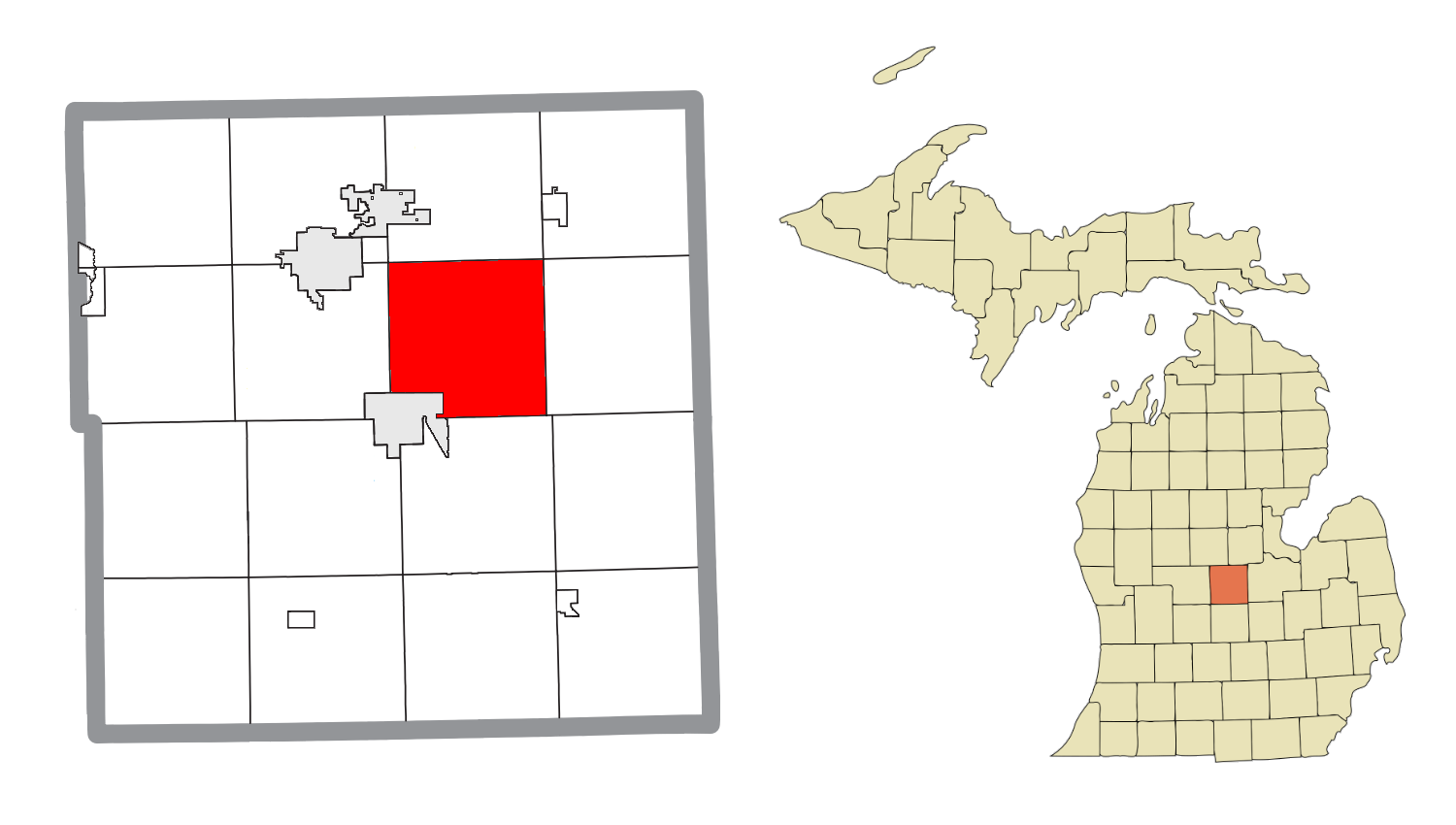
- Location within Gratiot County

- Location within the state of Michigan Location within the United States
- Coordinates: 43°20′37″N 84°33′28″W
- Country: United States
- State: Michigan
- County: Gratiot

Area
  - Total: 35.2 sq mi (91.2 km^{2})
  - Land: 35.2 sq mi (91.2 km^{2})
  - Water: 0 sq mi (0.0 km^{2})
- Elevation: 732 ft (223 m)

Population (2020)
  - Total: 849
  - Density: 24.1/sq mi (9.31/km^{2})
- Time zone: UTC-5 (Eastern (EST))
  - Summer (DST): UTC-4 (EDT)
- FIPS code: 26-25880
- GNIS feature ID: 1626238
- Website: https://www.emersontwp.com/

Emerson Township is a civil township of Gratiot County in the U.S. state of Michigan. The population was 849 at the 2020 census.

== History ==
Emerson Township was formed in 1855.

== Communities ==
- The northeast quadrant of the city of Ithaca is at the southwest corner of the township, but is administratively autonomous.
- The cities of Alma and St. Louis are just a few miles northwest on U.S. Highway 127.
- Beebe is an unincorporated community within the township at 43°20′07″N 84°32′53″W. It was established in 1883.

== Geography ==
According to the United States Census Bureau, the township has a total area of 35.2 square miles (91 km^{2}), all land.

== Demographics ==
As of the census of 2000, there were 966 people, 353 households, and 282 families residing in the township. The population density was 27.4 inhabitants per square mile (10.6/km^{2}). There were 383 housing units at an average density of 10.9 per square mile (4.2/km^{2}). The racial makeup of the township was 97.00% White, 0.10% African American, 0.41% Native American, 0.21% Asian, 1.76% from other races, and 0.52% from two or more races. Hispanic or Latino of any race were 2.90% of the population.

There were 353 households, out of which 36.0% had children under the age of 18 living with them, 71.7% were married couples living together, 5.4% had a female householder with no husband present, and 20.1% were non-families. 17.8% of all households were made up of individuals, and 10.8% had someone living alone who was 65 years of age or older. The average household size was 2.71 and the average family size was 3.05.

In the township the population was spread out, with 26.8% under the age of 18, 8.2% from 18 to 24, 26.9% from 25 to 44, 23.5% from 45 to 64, and 14.6% who were 65 years of age or older. The median age was 37 years. For every 100 females, there were 102.5 males. For every 100 females age 18 and over, there were 98.0 males.

The median income for a household in the township was $45,054, and the median income for a family was $46,447. Males had a median income of $34,375 versus $21,923 for females. The per capita income for the township was $18,159. About 11.7% of families and 12.0% of the population were below the poverty line, including 17.1% of those under age 18 and 6.5% of those age 65 or over.
