= North Star Township, Michigan =

- Civil township
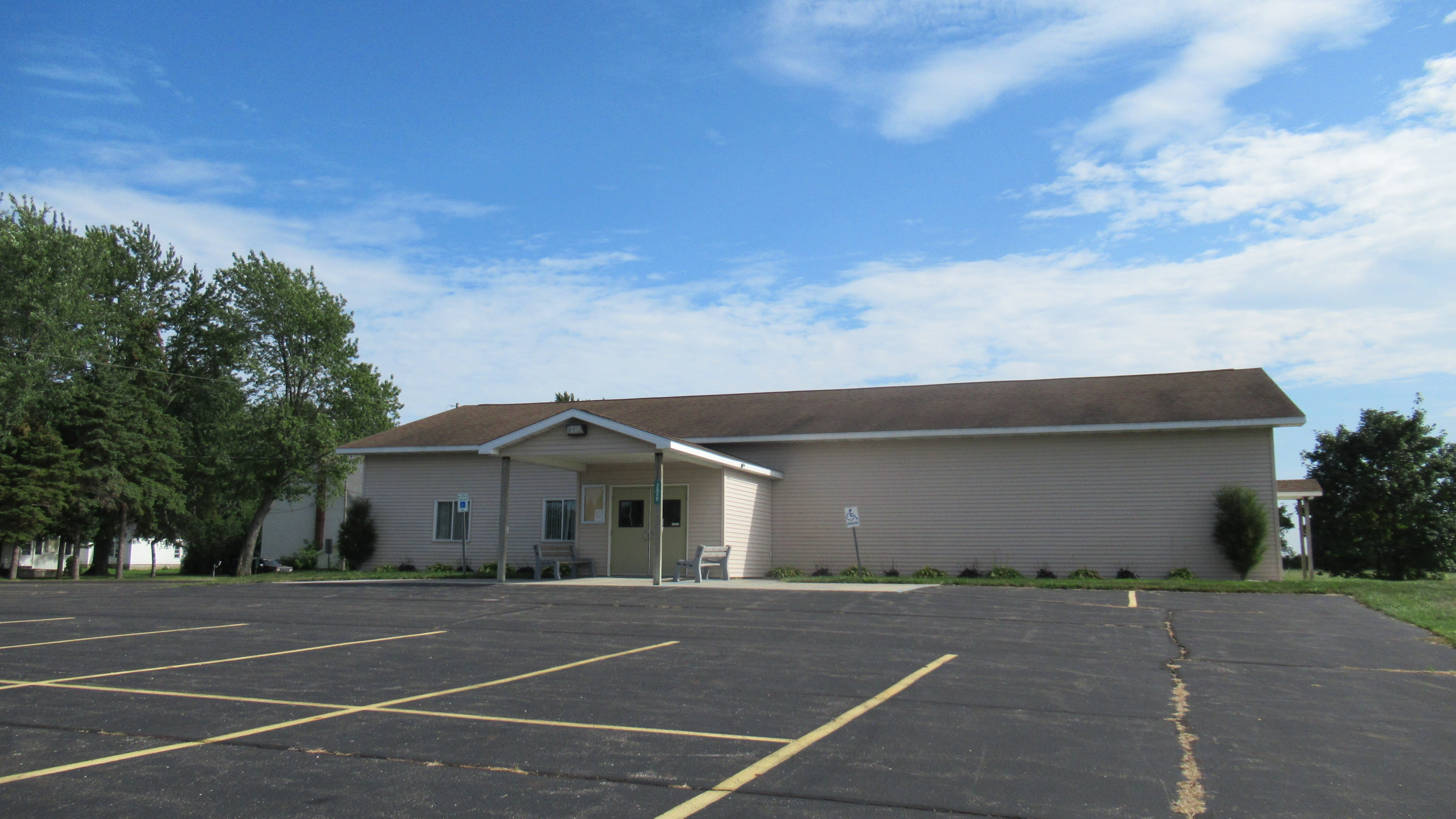
- North Star Township Hall

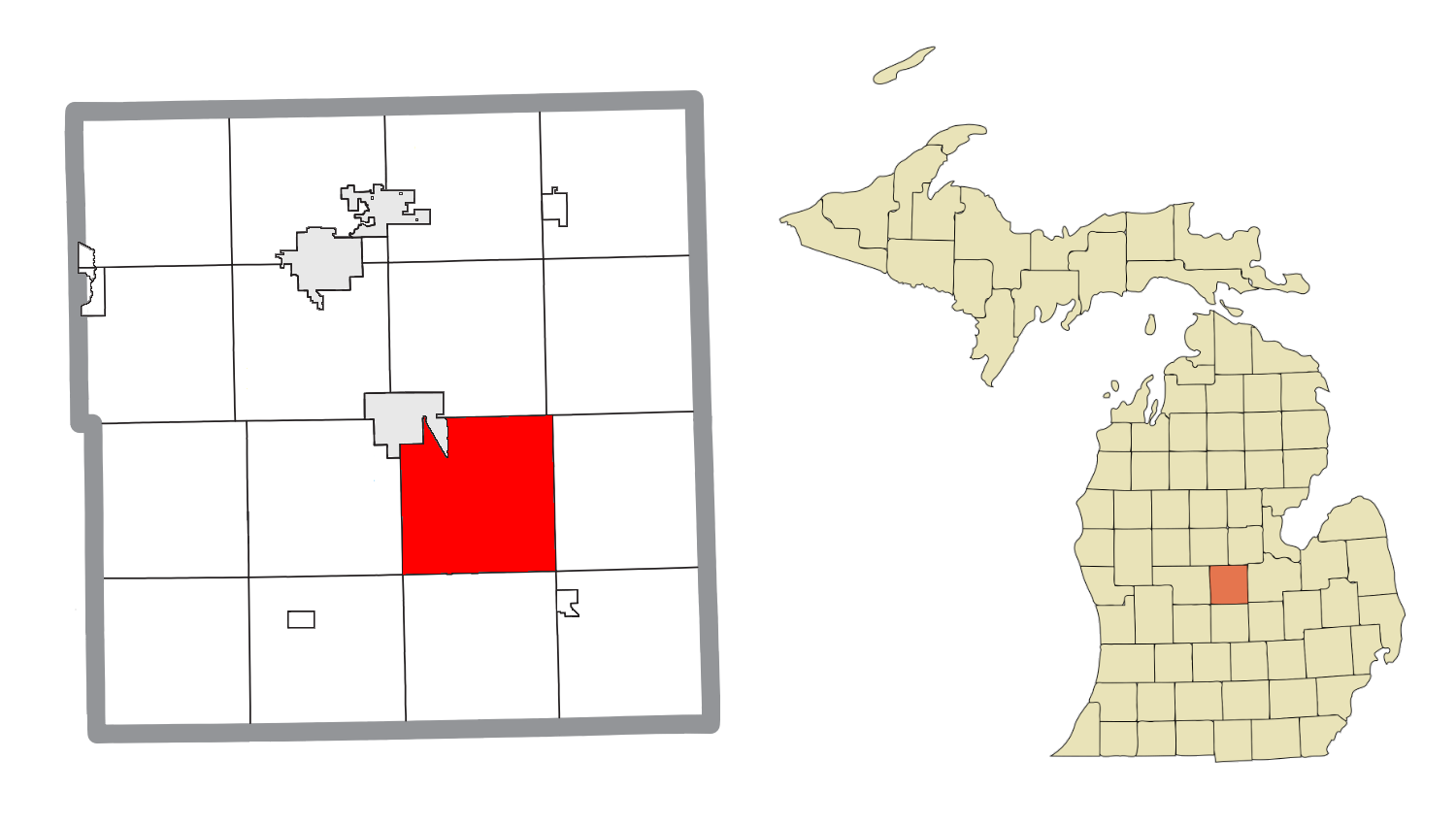
- Location within Gratiot County

- Location within the state of Michigan Location within the United States
- Coordinates: 43°14′54″N 84°32′27″W
- Country: United States
- State: Michigan
- County: Gratiot
- Established: 1857

Government
  - Supervisor: John Hardman
  - Clerk: Heidi Drowley

Area
  - Total: 34.16 sq mi (88.5 km^{2})
  - Land: 34.10 sq mi (88.3 km^{2})
  - Water: 0.06 sq mi (0.16 km^{2})
- Elevation: 719 ft (219 m)

Population (2020)
  - Total: 895
  - Density: 26.2/sq mi (10.1/km^{2})
- Time zone: UTC-5 (Eastern (EST))
  - Summer (DST): UTC-4 (EDT)
- ZIP code: 48847 (Ithaca); 48862 (North Star)
- Area code: 989
- FIPS code: 26-58880
- GNIS feature ID: 1626816
- Website: Official website

North Star Township is a civil township of Gratiot County in the U.S. state of Michigan. The population was 895 at the 2020 census.

== Communities ==
- North Star is an unincorporated community in the township along the Bad River at 43°14′54″N 84°32′36″W. North Star contains its own post office with the 48862 ZIP Code, which serves only a small area of the township.

== Geography ==
According to the U.S. Census Bureau, the township has a total area of 34.16 square miles (88.47 km^{2}), of which 34.10 square miles (88.3 km^{2}) is land and 0.06 square miles (0.16 km^{2}) (0.18%) is water.

U.S. Route 127 runs south–north near the center of the township to the city of Ithaca.

== Demographics ==
As of the census of 2000, there were 996 people, 369 households, and 290 families residing in the township. The population density was 28.8 inhabitants per square mile (11.1/km^{2}). There were 395 housing units at an average density of 11.4 per square mile (4.4/km^{2}). The racial makeup of the township was 98.69% White, 0.20% Native American, 0.60% from other races, and 0.50% from two or more races. Hispanic or Latino of any race were 1.31% of the population.

There were 369 households, out of which 29.8% had children under the age of 18 living with them, 67.2% were married couples living together, 6.2% had a female householder with no husband present, and 21.4% were non-families. 18.2% of all households were made up of individuals, and 8.1% had someone living alone who was 65 years of age or older. The average household size was 2.64 and the average family size was 2.95.

In the township the population was spread out, with 24.4% under the age of 18, 8.3% from 18 to 24, 24.4% from 25 to 44, 27.2% from 45 to 64, and 15.7% who were 65 years of age or older. The median age was 39 years. For every 100 females, there were 97.6 males. For every 100 females age 18 and over, there were 99.7 males.

The median income for a household in the township was $38,750, and the median income for a family was $45,000. Males had a median income of $33,125 versus $25,208 for females. The per capita income for the township was $19,246. About 7.1% of families and 12.2% of the population were below the poverty line, including 12.6% of those under age 18 and 10.3% of those age 65 or over.

== Images ==
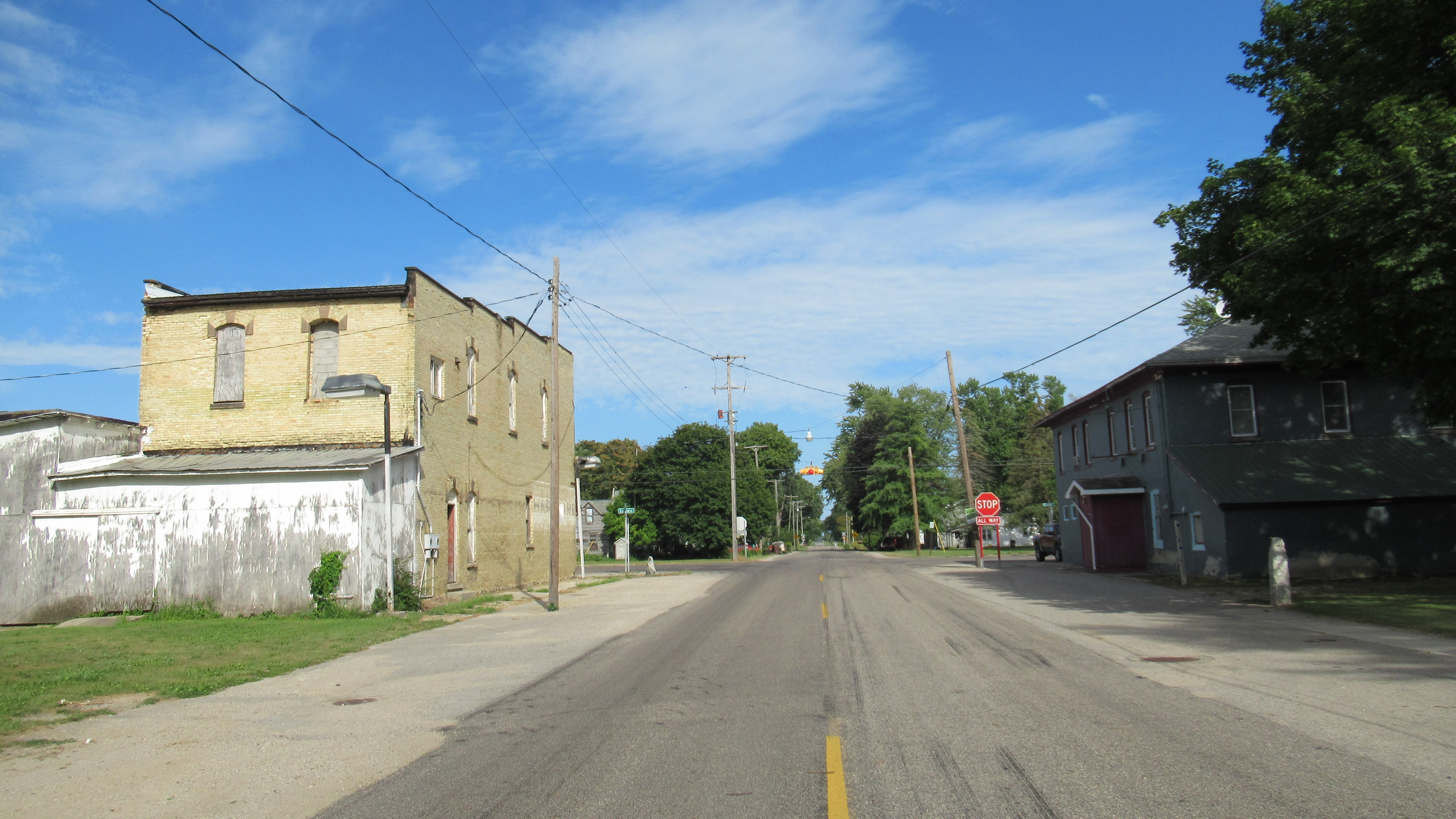
Community of North Star

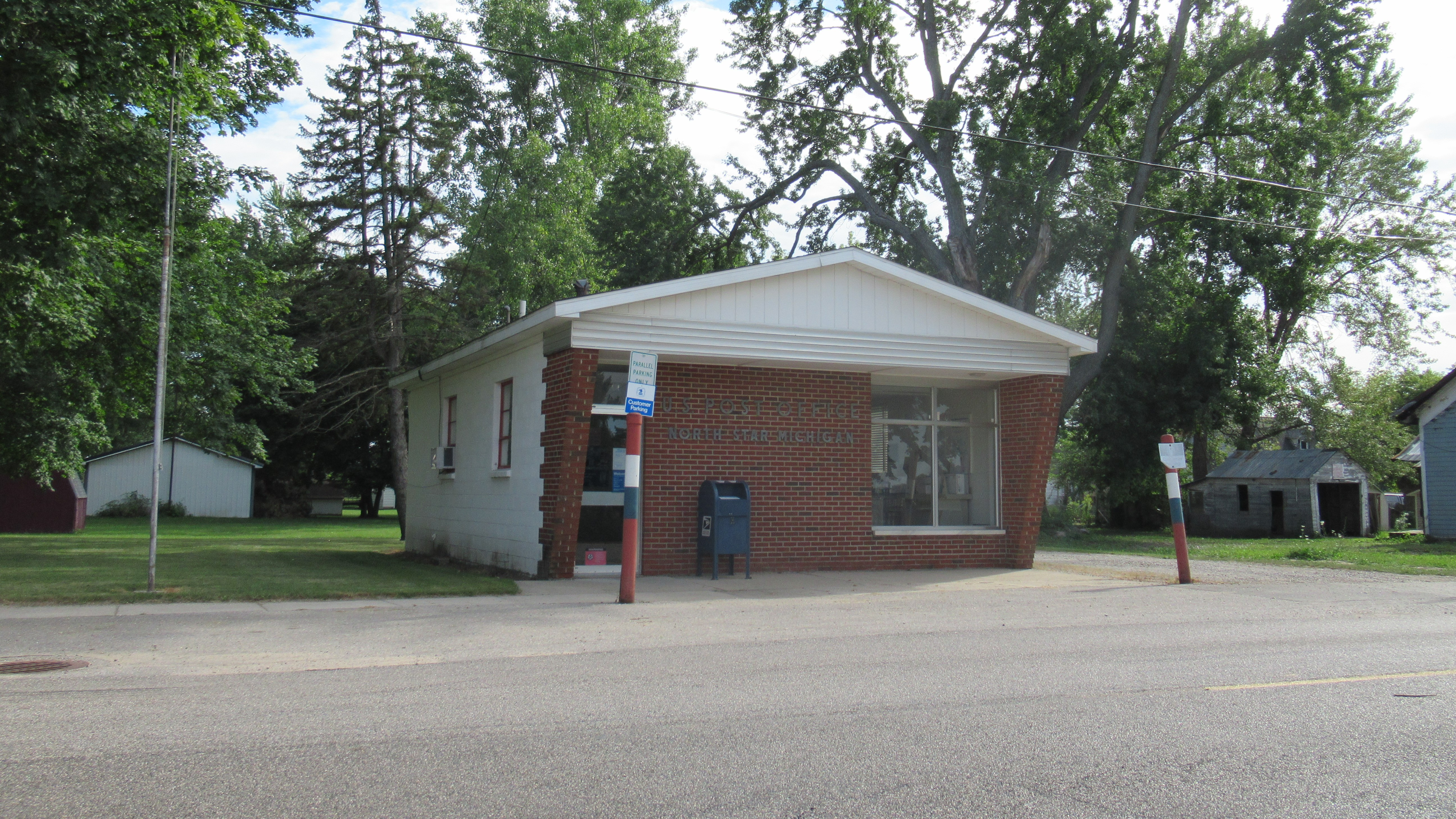
U.S. Post Office in North Star

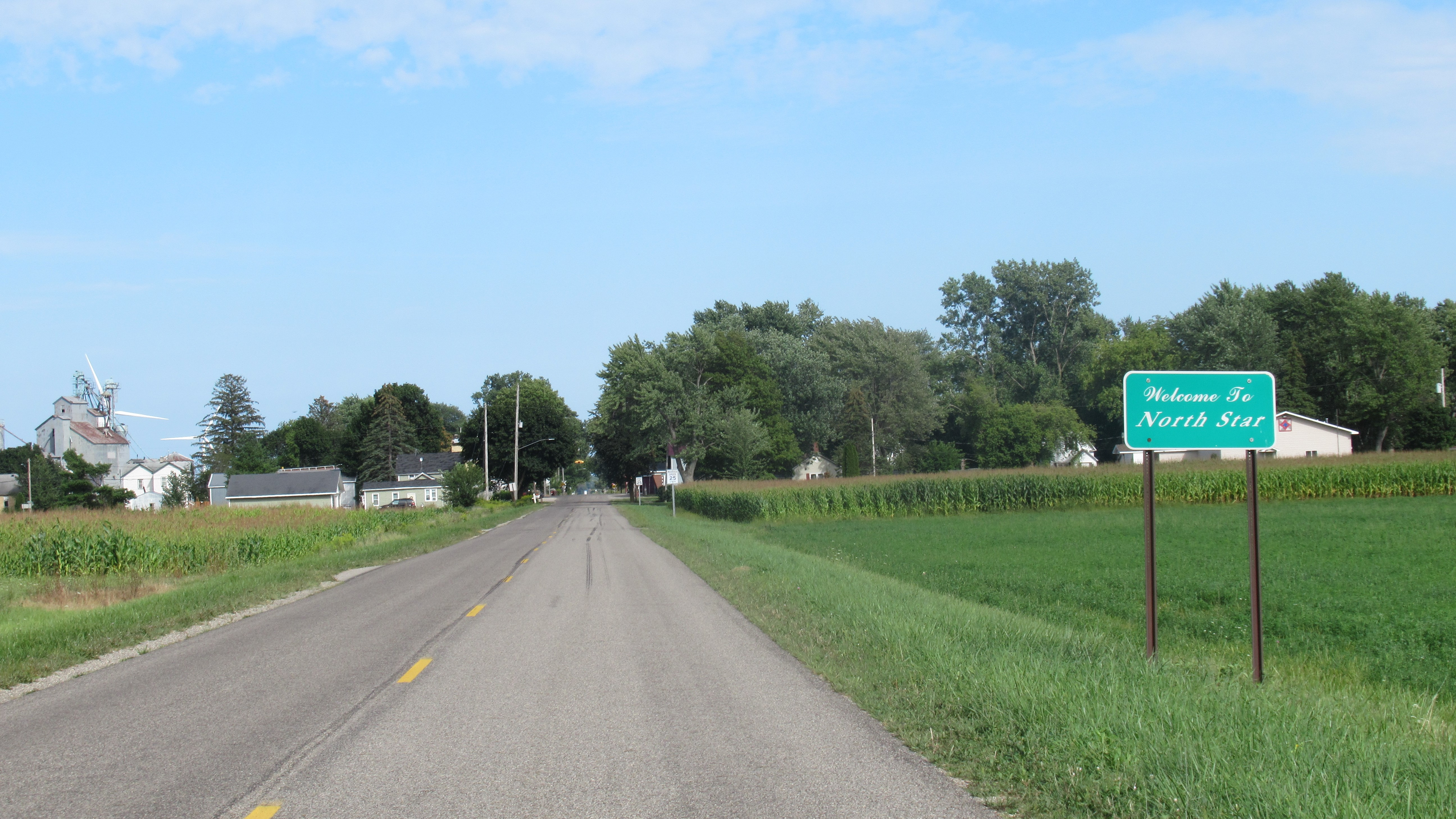
East Buchanan Road
