= Breckenridge, Michigan =

- Village
- Village of Breckenridge
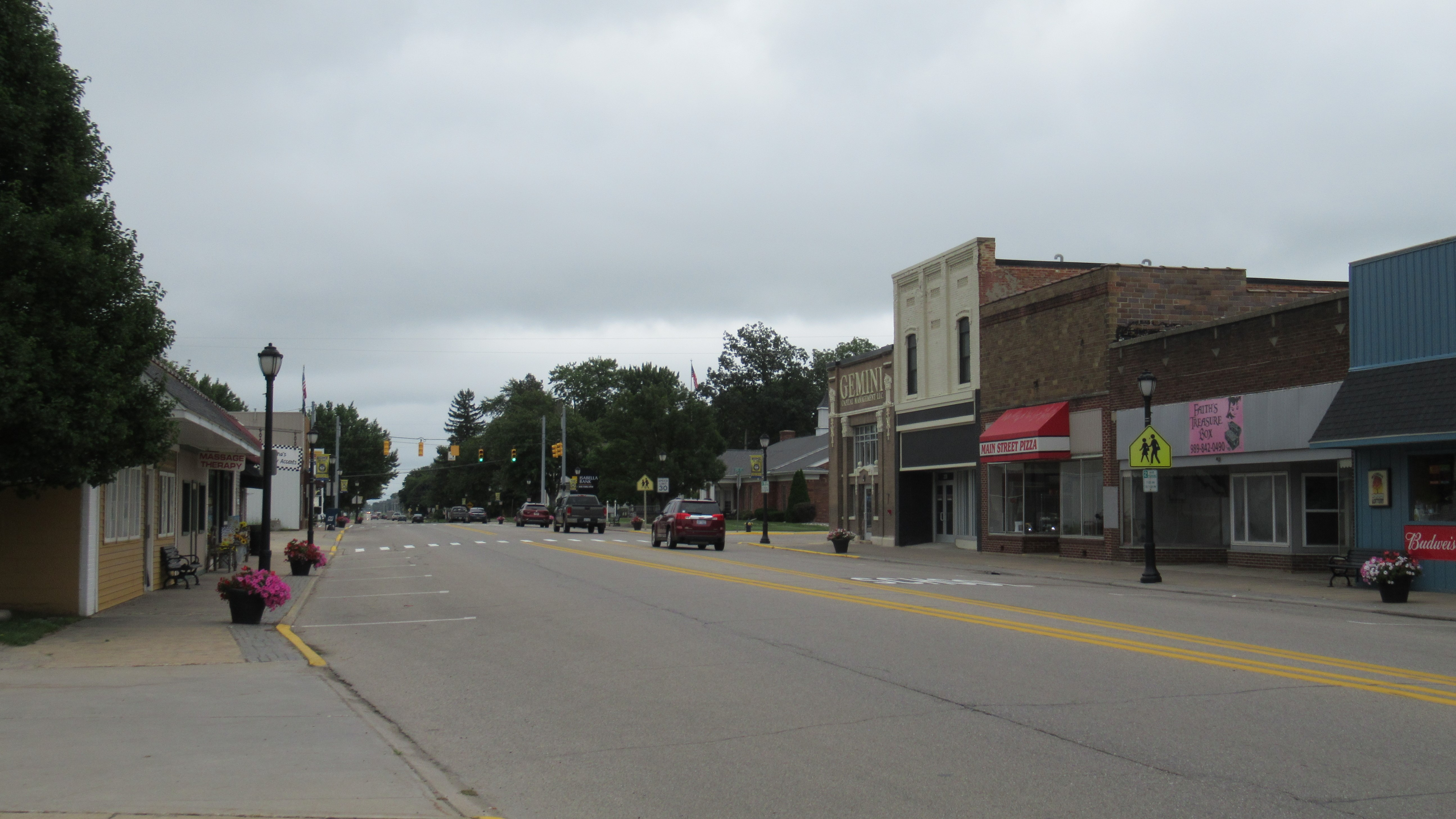
- Looking east along W. Saginaw Street (M-46)

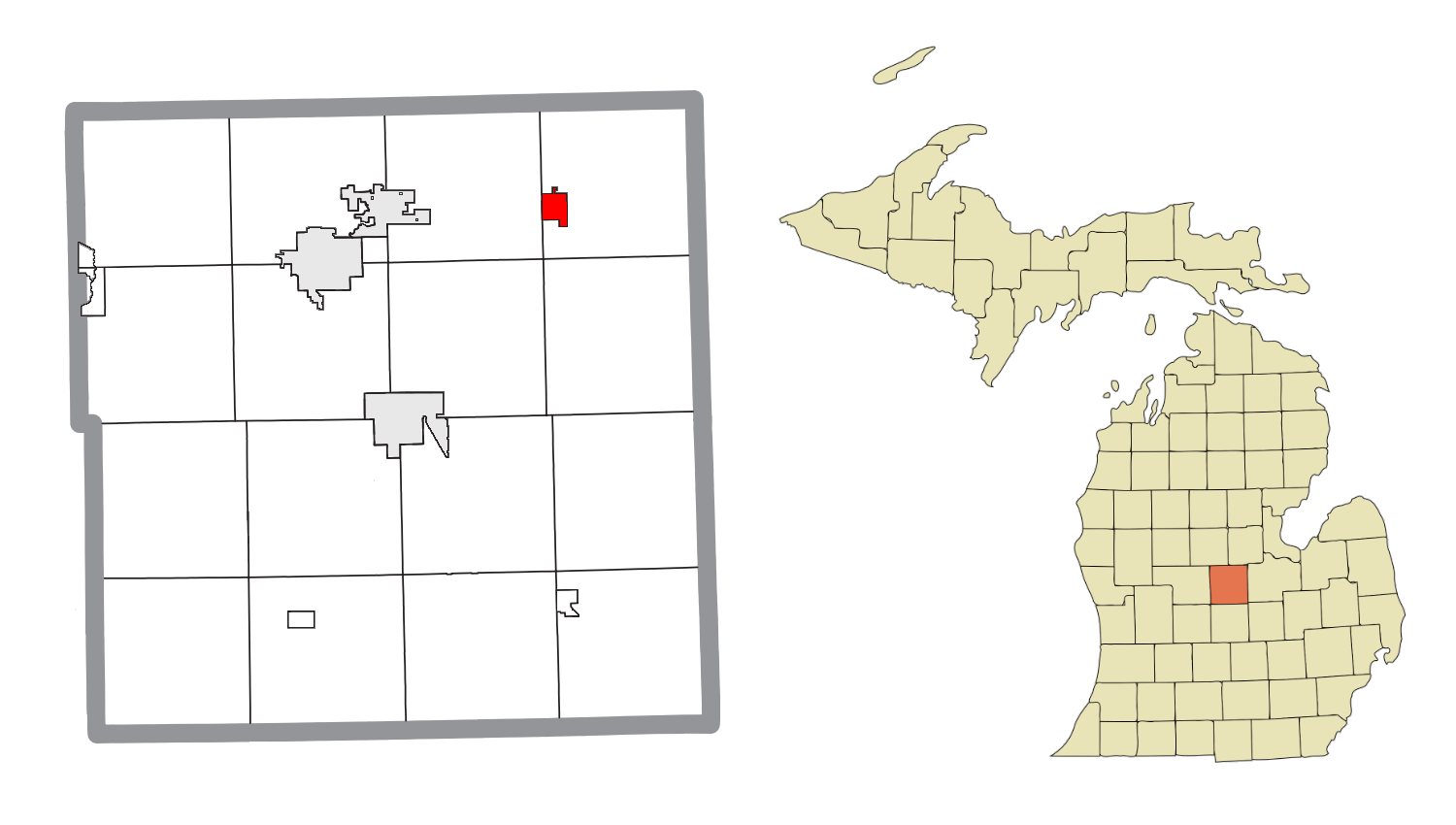
- Location within Gratiot County

- Location within the state of Michigan Location within the United States
- Coordinates: 43°24′27″N 84°28′42″W
- Country: United States
- State: Michigan
- County: Gratiot
- Township: Wheeler
- Settled: 1872
- Incorporated: 1908

Government
  - Type: Village council
  - President: Charles Seeley
  - Clerk: Bridget McPherson
  - Manager: Jeff Ostrander

Area
  - Total: 1.07 sq mi (2.76 km^{2})
  - Land: 1.06 sq mi (2.75 km^{2})
  - Water: 0.0039 sq mi (0.01 km^{2})
- Elevation: 735 ft (224 m)

Population (2020)
  - Total: 1,238
  - Density: 1,164.4/sq mi (449.56/km^{2})
- Time zone: UTC-5 (Eastern (EST))
  - Summer (DST): UTC-4 (EDT)
- ZIP code(s): 48615
- Area code: 989
- FIPS code: 26-10160
- GNIS feature ID: 2398170
- Website: Official website

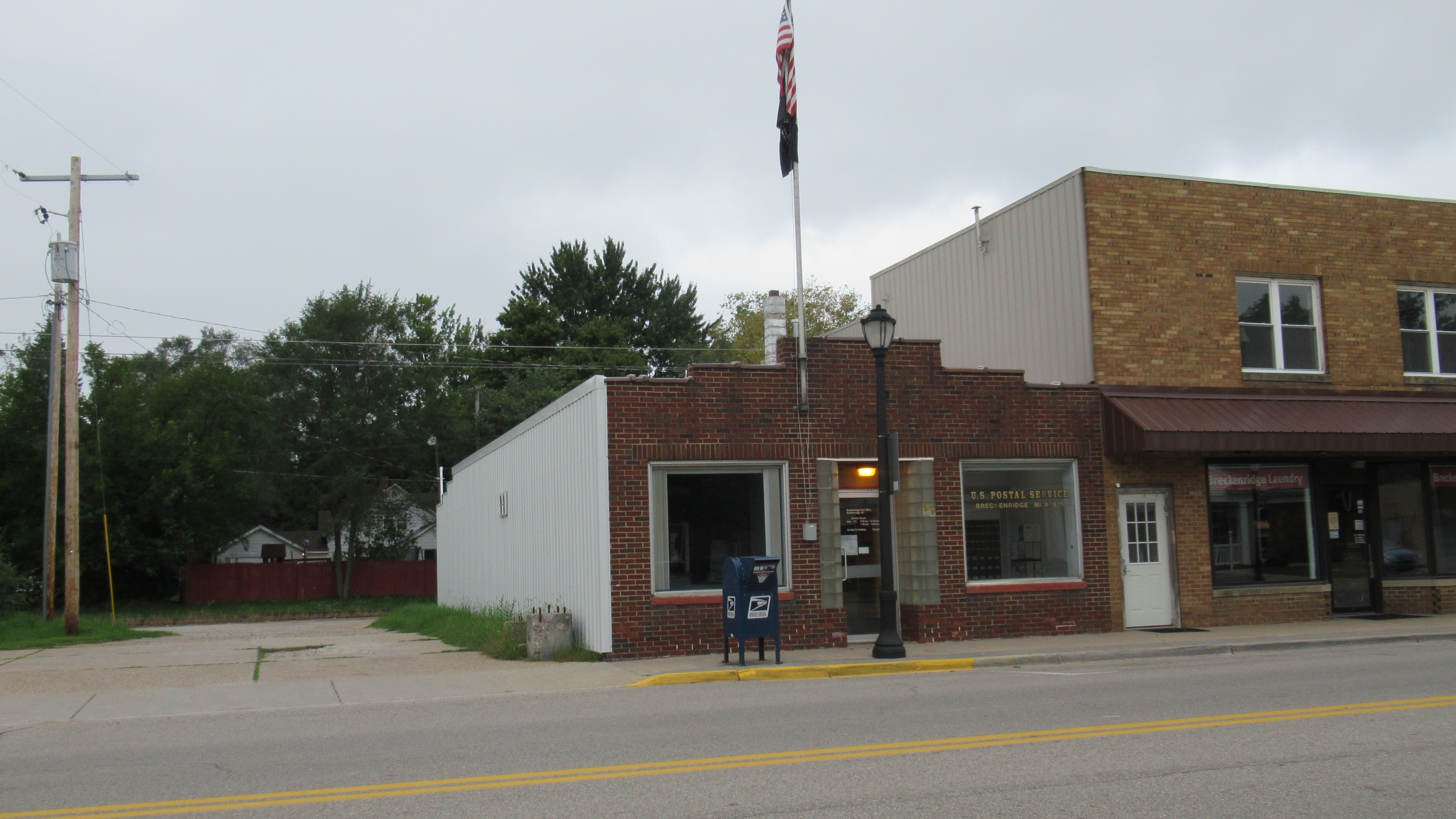
U.S. Post Office in Breckenridge

Breckenridge is a village in Gratiot County in the U.S. state of Michigan. The population was 1,238 at the 2020 census. The village is located in Wheeler Township.

== History ==
Breckenridge was founded in 1872 when the Pere Marquette Railroad came through the area. It was incorporated as a village in 1908.

The village has had graded schooling since 1893 and currently has one school district: Breckenridge Community Schools.

== Geography ==
According to the United States Census Bureau, the village has a total area of 1.07 square miles (2.77 km^{2}), all land.

== Demographics ==
Historical population
Census	Pop.	Note	%±
1880	237		—
1910	595		—
1920	698		17.3%
1930	685		−1.9%
1940	868		26.7%
1950	985		13.5%
1960	1,131		14.8%
1970	1,257		11.1%
1980	1,495		18.9%
1990	1,301		−13.0%
2000	1,339		2.9%
2010	1,328		−0.8%
2020	1,238		−6.8%
U.S. Decennial Census

=== 2010 census ===
As of the census of 2010, there were 1,328 people, 535 households, and 349 families residing in the village. The population density was 1,241.1 inhabitants per square mile (479.2/km^{2}). There were 595 housing units at an average density of 556.1 per square mile (214.7/km^{2}). The racial makeup of the village was 96.8% White, 0.5% African American, 0.8% Native American, 0.8% from other races, and 1.2% from two or more races. Hispanic or Latino of any race were 4.4% of the population.

There were 535 households, of which 35.3% had children under the age of 18 living with them, 45.2% were married couples living together, 16.6% had a female householder with no husband present, 3.4% had a male householder with no wife present, and 34.8% were non-families. 29.0% of all households were made up of individuals, and 12.4% had someone living alone who was 65 years of age or older. The average household size was 2.48 and the average family size was 3.02.

The median age in the village was 35.8 years. 27.6% of residents were under the age of 18; 9% were between the ages of 18 and 24; 24.8% were from 25 to 44; 25.1% were from 45 to 64; and 13.5% were 65 years of age or older. The gender makeup of the village was 48.3% male and 51.7% female.

=== 2000 census ===
As of the census of 2000, there were 1,339 people, 543 households, and 360 families residing in the village. The population density was 1,268.4 inhabitants per square mile (489.7/km^{2}). There were 580 housing units at an average density of 549.4 per square mile (212.1/km^{2}). The racial makeup of the village was 95.15% White, 0.15% Native American, 0.07% Asian, 0.07% Pacific Islander, 3.21% from other races, and 1.34% from two or more races. Hispanic or Latino of any race were 5.75% of the population.

There were 543 households, out of which 35.4% had children under the age of 18 living with them, 48.3% were married couples living together, 14.0% had a female householder with no husband present, and 33.7% were non-families. 30.4% of all households were made up of individuals, and 16.0% had someone living alone who was 65 years of age or older. The average household size was 2.47 and the average family size was 3.05.

In the village, the population was spread out, with 28.3% under the age of 18, 9.9% from 18 to 24, 28.3% from 25 to 44, 20.4% from 45 to 64, and 13.1% who were 65 years of age or older. The median age was 34 years. For every 100 females, there were 91.6 males. For every 100 females age 18 and over, there were 83.2 males.

The median income for a household in the village was $36,200, and the median income for a family was $40,313. Males had a median income of $31,979 versus $24,083 for females. The per capita income for the village was $16,204. About 8.5% of families and 8.3% of the population were below the poverty line, including 10.5% of those under age 18 and 2.2% of those age 65 or over.

== Notable people ==
- Jim Northrup, outfielder for the Detroit Tigers, Montreal Expos, and Baltimore Orioles; born in Breckenridge
