= Fulton Township, Michigan =

- Civil township
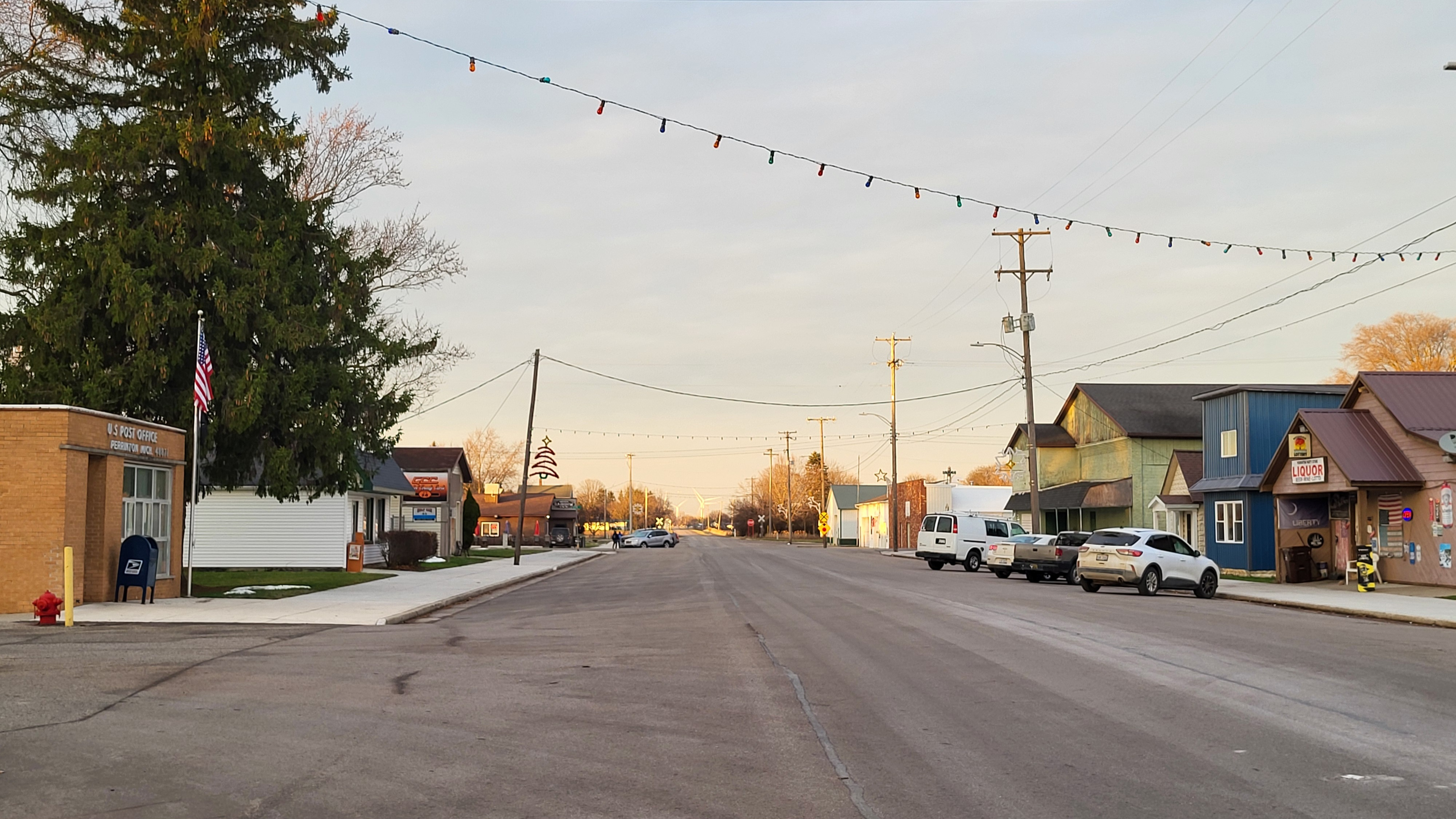
- The village of Perrinton along Robinson Street

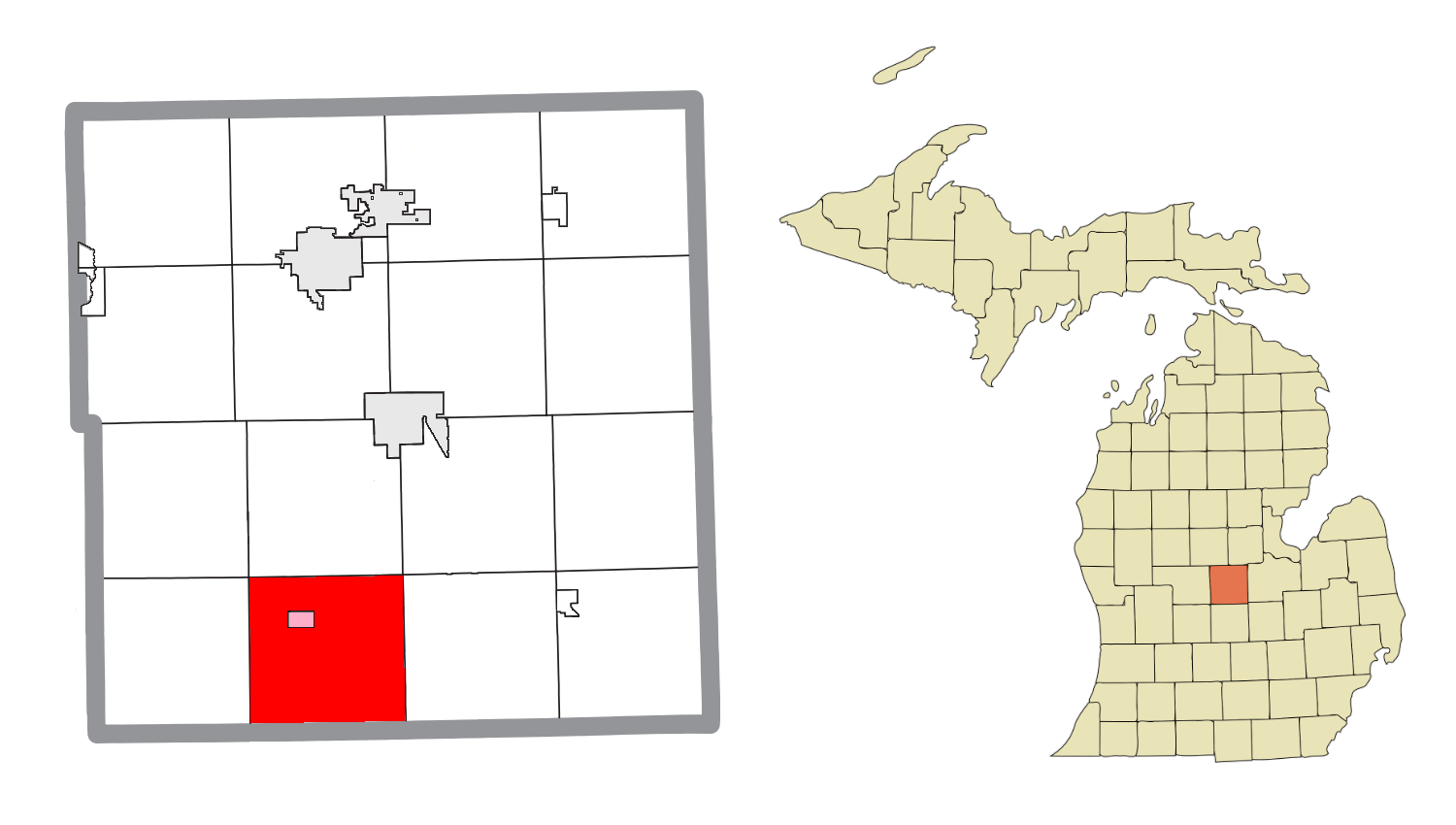
- Location within Gratiot County (red) and the administered village of Perrinton (pink)

- Location within the state of Michigan Location within the United States
- Coordinates: 43°9′46″N 84°40′22″W
- Country: United States
- State: Michigan
- County: Gratiot

Area
  - Total: 35.8 sq mi (92.6 km^{2})
  - Land: 35.2 sq mi (91.2 km^{2})
  - Water: 0.54 sq mi (1.4 km^{2})
- Elevation: 735 ft (224 m)

Population (2020)
  - Total: 2,484
  - Density: 70.5/sq mi (27.2/km^{2})
- Time zone: UTC-5 (Eastern (EST))
  - Summer (DST): UTC-4 (EDT)
- FIPS code: 26-31080
- GNIS feature ID: 1626326
- Website: https://fultontwp.com/

Fulton Township is a civil township of Gratiot County in the U.S. state of Michigan. The population was 2,484 at the 2020 census.

== Communities ==
- The village of Perrinton is within the township.
- Middleton is an unincorporated community in the township, about one mile west of Perrinton and just north of Fulton High School on M-57 at 43°11′00″N 84°42′32″W. The ZIP code is 48856.
- Pompeii is an unincorporated community in the township about four miles east of Perrinton on the boundary with neighboring Washington Township at 43°11′02″N 84°36′03″W.

== Geography ==
According to the United States Census Bureau, the township has a total area of 35.8 square miles (93 km^{2}), of which 35.2 square miles (91 km^{2}) is land and 0.6 square miles (1.6 km^{2}) (1.57%) is water. The township contains portions of the Maple River State Game Area.

== Demographics ==
As of the census of 2000, there were 2,413 people, 884 households, and 670 families residing in the township. The population density was 68.5 inhabitants per square mile (26.4/km^{2}). There were 963 housing units at an average density of 27.4 per square mile (10.6/km^{2}). The racial makeup of the township was 96.77% White, 0.17% African American, 0.46% Native American, 0.04% Asian, 1.08% from other races, and 1.49% from two or more races. Hispanic or Latino of any race were 2.36% of the population.

There were 884 households, out of which 33.6% had children under the age of 18 living with them, 64.4% were married couples living together, 8.1% had a female householder with no husband present, and 24.1% were non-families. 19.2% of all households were made up of individuals, and 9.2% had someone living alone who was 65 years of age or older. The average household size was 2.68 and the average family size was 3.06.

In the township the population was spread out, with 26.4% under the age of 18, 7.5% from 18 to 24, 28.8% from 25 to 44, 24.3% from 45 to 64, and 12.9% who were 65 years of age or older. The median age was 38 years. For every 100 females, there were 98.6 males. For every 100 females age 18 and over, there were 95.1 males.

The median income for a household in the township was $41,667, and the median income for a family was $48,060. Males had a median income of $36,319 versus $27,452 for females. The per capita income for the township was $19,101. About 8.0% of families and 10.8% of the population were below the poverty line, including 12.6% of those under age 18 and 8.2% of those age 65 or over.
