= Gratiot County, Michigan =

County in Michigan, United States

- County
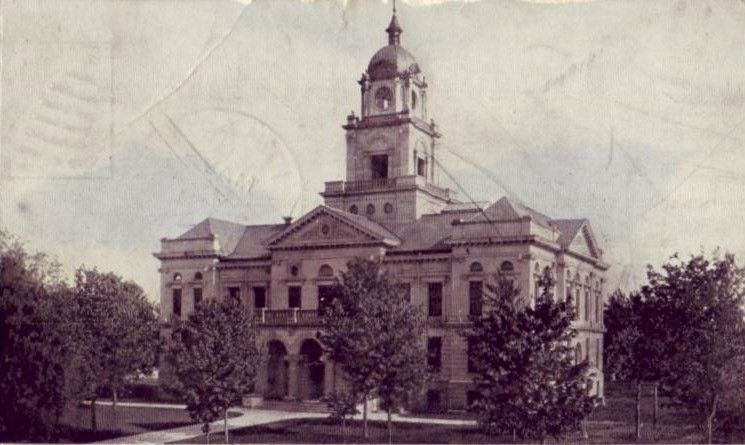
- Gratiot County Courthouse

- Seal

- Location within the U.S. state of Michigan
- Coordinates: 43°17′N 84°36′W
- Country: United States
- State: Michigan
- Founded: 1855
- Named for: Charles Gratiot
- Seat: Ithaca
- Largest city: Alma

Area
  - Total: 572 sq mi (1,480 km^{2})
  - Land: 568 sq mi (1,470 km^{2})
  - Water: 3.1 sq mi (8.0 km^{2}) 0.6%

Population (2020)
  - Total: 41,761
  - Estimate (2025): 41,190 ▼
  - Density: 75/sq mi (29/km^{2})
- Time zone: UTC−5 (Eastern)
  - Summer (DST): UTC−4 (EDT)
- Congressional district: 2nd
- Website: https://www.gratiotmi.com/

Gratiot County (/ˈɡræʃɪt/ GRASH-it) is a county in the U.S. state of Michigan. As of the 2020 Census, the population was 41,761. The county seat is Ithaca, although its most populous city is Alma.

Gratiot County comprises the Alma, MI Micropolitan Statistical Area, which is also part of the Mount Pleasant-Alma, MI Combined Statistical Area. The Gratiot County Courthouse was designed in the classical revival style by Claire Allen, a prominent southern Michigan architect. It is one of seven sites in the county listed on the National Register of Historic Places (No. 76002291 added 1976). In June 2012, the 212.8 MW Gratiot County Wind Project opened, the largest wind power installation in the state.

== History ==
Gratiot County, Michigan is named for Captain Charles Gratiot, who supervised the building of Port Huron's Fort Gratiot. It was described by the Territorial Legislature in 1831. By 1837, the Territory had been admitted to the Union as a state; in 1855 the State Legislature authorized the organization of Gratiot County – the death year of the county's namesake.

Gratiot County was a New England settlement. The original founders of Ithaca and of Alma were settlers from New England, "Yankees", descended from the English Puritans who settled the northeastern coast of the new continent in the 1600s. The Gratiot County settlers were farmers who headed west into what was then the wilds of the Northwest Territory during the early 1800s. Most of them arrived as a result of the completion of the Erie Canal as well as the close of the Black Hawk War. They arrived to virgin forest and wild prairie, but laid out farms, constructed roads, erected government buildings and established post routes. They maintained their customs, such as passion for education, and abhorrence of the existing slave trade. They were members of the Congregationalist Church or the Episcopal Church.

In the 1890s, German immigrants began settling in Gratiot County. See List of Michigan county name etymologies. Emil Lockwood, a noted Michigan legislator, represented Gratiot County in the Michigan Senate from 1963 to 1970, much of the time as Senate Majority Leader.

There are six Michigan historical markers in Gratiot County:

- Alma College
- Gratiot County
- Jackson Weller House
- Lumberjack Park
- Michigan Masonic Home
- Saginaw and Gratiot County State Road / Saginaw Valley & St. Louis Railroad

== Geography ==
According to the U.S. Census Bureau, the county has a total area of 572 square miles (1,480 km^{2}), of which 568 square miles (1,470 km^{2}) is land and 3.1 square miles (8.0 km^{2}) (0.6%) is water. It is considered to be part of Central Michigan.

=== Adjacent counties ===
- Midland County – northeast
- Isabella County – northwest
- Saginaw County – east
- Montcalm County – west
- Shiawassee County – southeast
- Clinton County – south
- Ionia County – southwest

=== Major highways ===
- US 127 – runs north to I-75 and south to Lansing.
- Bus. US 127 – business loop through downtown Alma.
- Bus. US 127 – business loop through downtown Ithaca.
- Bus. US 127 – business loop through downtown St. Louis.
- M-30 – a north–south highway that runs north into Midland County; runs north to West Branch.
- M-46 – cross-peninsular highway that runs east to Saginaw and Port Sanilac; runs west to Muskegon.
- M-57 – runs east to Flint; runs west to US 131 near Grand Rapids.

== Demographics ==
Historical population
Census	Pop.	Note	%±
1860	4,042		—
1870	11,810		192.2%
1880	21,936		85.7%
1890	28,668		30.7%
1900	29,889		4.3%
1910	28,820		−3.6%
1920	33,914		17.7%
1930	30,252		−10.8%
1940	32,205		6.5%
1950	33,429		3.8%
1960	37,012		10.7%
1970	39,246		6.0%
1980	40,448		3.1%
1990	38,982		−3.6%
2000	42,285		8.5%
2010	42,476		0.5%
2020	41,761		−1.7%
2025 (est.)	41,190	▼	−1.4%
US Decennial Census; 1790-1960 1900-1990; 1990-2000 2010-2018

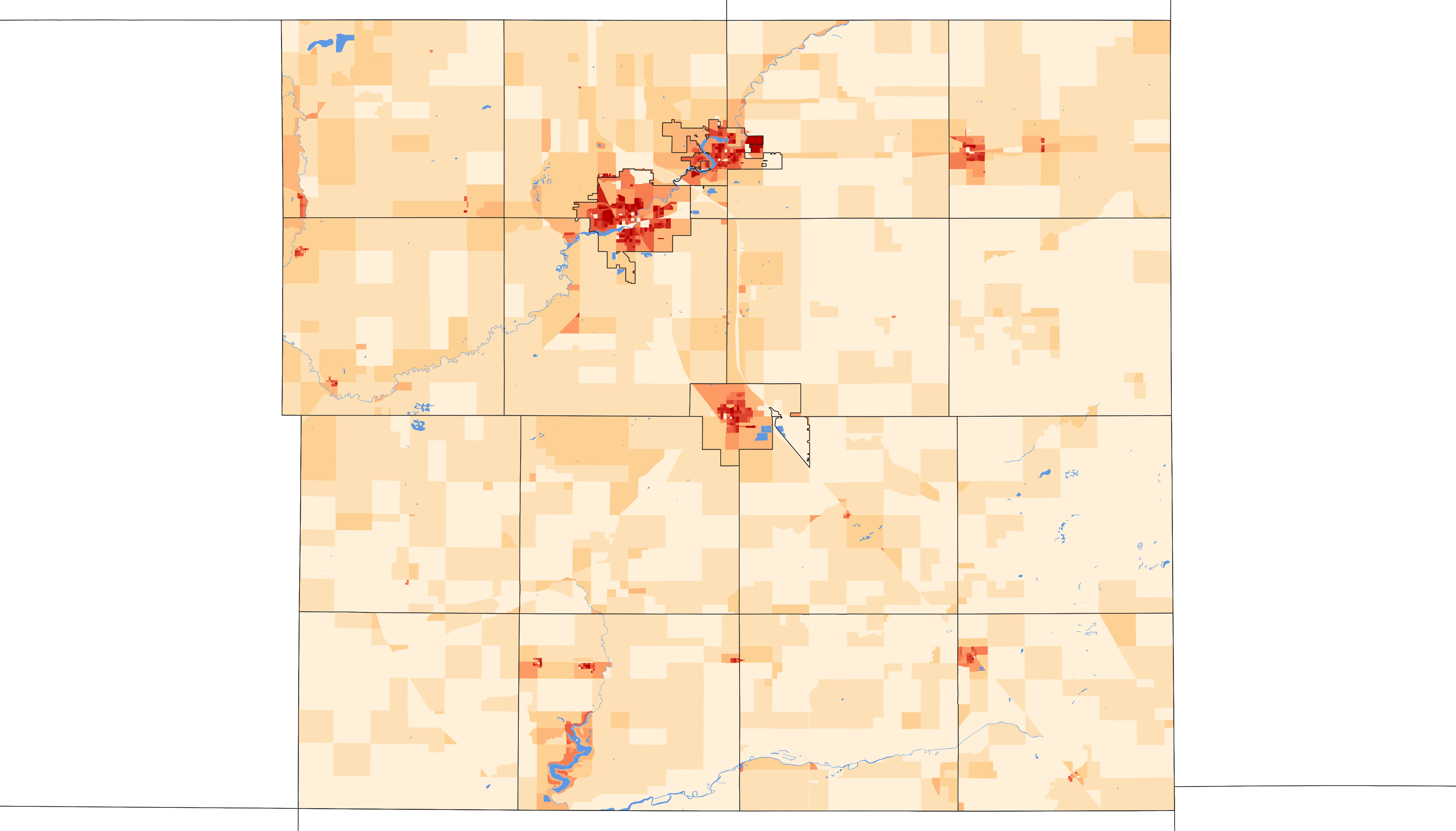
2020 population density of Gratiot County MI by census block

=== 2020 census ===
Gratiot County, Michigan – Racial and ethnic composition Note: the US Census treats Hispanic/Latino as an ethnic category. This table excludes Latinos from the racial categories and assigns them to a separate category. Hispanics/Latinos may be of any race.
Race / Ethnicity (NH = Non-Hispanic)	Pop 1980	Pop 1990	Pop 2000	Pop 2010	Pop 2020	% 1980	% 1990	% 2000	% 2010	% 2020
White alone (NH)	38,883	36,956	38,024	37,144	34,812	96.13%	94.80%	89.92%	87.45%	83.36%
Black or African American alone (NH)	35	316	1,554	2,341	2,195	0.09%	0.81%	3.68%	5.51%	5.26%
Native American or Alaska Native alone (NH)	126	133	200	172	156	0.31%	0.34%	0.47%	0.40%	0.37%
Asian alone (NH)	59	94	144	145	161	0.15%	0.24%	0.34%	0.34%	0.39%
Native Hawaiian or Pacific Islander alone (NH)	x	x	5	8	28	x	x	0.01%	0.02%	0.07%
Other race alone (NH)	24	16	18	16	96	0.06%	0.04%	0.04%	0.04%	0.23%
Mixed race or Multiracial (NH)	x	x	465	349	1,160	x	x	1.10%	0.82%	2.78%
Hispanic or Latino (any race)	1,321	1,467	1,875	2,301	3,153	3.27%	3.76%	4.43%	5.42%	7.55%
Total	40,448	38,982	42,285	42,476	41,761	100.00%	100.00%	100.00%	100.00%	100.00%

=== 2020 census ===
As of the 2020 census, the county had a population of 41,761, and the median age was 39.7 years. 21.7% of residents were under the age of 18 and 18.2% were 65 years of age or older. For every 100 females there were 119.0 males, and for every 100 females age 18 and over there were 121.2 males age 18 and over.

The racial makeup of the county was 86.2% White, 5.4% Black or African American, 0.5% American Indian and Alaska Native, 0.4% Asian, 0.1% Native Hawaiian and Pacific Islander, 2.8% from some other race, and 4.7% from two or more races. Hispanic or Latino residents of any race comprised 7.6% of the population.

41.7% of residents lived in urban areas, while 58.3% lived in rural areas.

There were 14,764 households in the county, of which 28.1% had children under the age of 18 living in them. Of all households, 48.4% were married-couple households, 18.3% were households with a male householder and no spouse or partner present, and 25.0% were households with a female householder and no spouse or partner present. About 28.0% of all households were made up of individuals and 13.4% had someone living alone who was 65 years of age or older.

There were 16,032 housing units, of which 7.9% were vacant. Among occupied housing units, 74.7% were owner-occupied and 25.3% were renter-occupied. The homeowner vacancy rate was 1.5% and the rental vacancy rate was 7.1%.

=== 2000 census ===
As of the 2000 United States census, there were 42,285 people, 14,501 households, and 10,397 families residing in the county. The population density was 74 people per square mile (29 people/km^{2}). There were 15,516 housing units at an average density of 27 per square mile (10/km^{2}). The racial makeup of the county was 92.01% White, 3.72% Black or African American, 0.55% Native American, 0.34% Asian, 0.02% Pacific Islander, 1.76% from other races, and 1.60% from two or more races. 4.43% of the population were Hispanic or Latino of any race. 29.8% were of English ancestry, 24.4% were of German ancestry and 6.9% Irish ancestry, 96.1% spoke English and 2.7% Spanish as their first language.

There were 14,501 households, out of which 34.00% had children under the age of 18 living with them, 57.60% were married couples living together, 10.20% had a female householder with no husband present, and 28.30% were non-families. 23.70% of all households were made up of individuals, and 10.70% had someone living alone who was 65 years of age or older. The average household size was 2.57 and the average family size was 3.02.

The county population included 23.80% under the age of 18, 11.60% from 18 to 24, 29.50% from 25 to 44, 21.60% from 45 to 64, and 13.50% who were 65 years of age or older. The median age was 36 years. For every 100 females there were 108.30 males. For every 100 females age 18 and over, there were 109.10 males.

The median income for a household in the county was $37,262, and the median income for a family was $43,954. Males had a median income of $32,442 versus $22,333 for females. The per capita income for the county was $17,118. About 7.30% of families and 10.30% of the population were below the poverty line, including 11.70% of those under age 18 and 9.20% of those age 65 or over.

=== Religion ===
The Roman Catholic Diocese of Saginaw is the controlling regional body for the Catholic Church.

== Government ==
Gratiot County has been reliably Republican from the beginning. Since 1884, the Republican Party nominee has carried the county vote in 78% of the elections (28 of 36 elections).

United States presidential election results for Gratiot County, Michigan
Year	Republican		Democratic		Third party(ies)	
Year	No.	%	No.	%	No.	%
1884	2,676	46.99%	2,736	48.04%	283	4.97%
1888	3,667	52.35%	2,854	40.74%	484	6.91%
1892	3,037	48.83%	1,661	26.70%	1,522	24.47%
1896	3,380	44.97%	3,971	52.83%	165	2.20%
1900	4,263	55.49%	3,202	41.68%	218	2.84%
1904	4,530	67.59%	1,863	27.80%	309	4.61%
1908	4,158	61.65%	2,372	35.17%	214	3.17%
1912	1,809	30.64%	1,835	31.08%	2,261	38.29%
1916	3,434	52.16%	2,960	44.96%	190	2.89%
1920	6,578	77.41%	1,846	21.72%	74	0.87%
1924	6,720	76.09%	1,839	20.82%	273	3.09%
1928	8,823	82.14%	1,854	17.26%	64	0.60%
1932	5,123	44.40%	6,124	53.08%	291	2.52%
1936	5,322	47.11%	5,457	48.30%	519	4.59%
1940	8,661	69.01%	3,825	30.48%	65	0.52%
1944	7,987	71.03%	3,160	28.10%	97	0.86%
1948	7,035	70.16%	2,659	26.52%	333	3.32%
1952	10,034	77.06%	2,887	22.17%	100	0.77%
1956	10,319	75.71%	3,267	23.97%	44	0.32%
1960	9,854	71.75%	3,859	28.10%	21	0.15%
1964	5,369	42.02%	7,383	57.78%	26	0.20%
1968	8,404	62.68%	4,040	30.13%	964	7.19%
1972	9,904	68.41%	4,370	30.18%	204	1.41%
1976	9,526	63.01%	5,429	35.91%	163	1.08%
1980	9,294	59.30%	4,916	31.37%	1,462	9.33%
1984	10,456	72.08%	4,000	27.57%	50	0.34%
1988	8,447	59.36%	5,719	40.19%	64	0.45%
1992	6,280	39.55%	5,678	35.76%	3,921	24.69%
1996	6,214	41.77%	6,793	45.67%	1,868	12.56%
2000	8,312	54.76%	6,538	43.07%	329	2.17%
2004	9,834	56.59%	7,377	42.45%	168	0.97%
2008	8,322	46.92%	9,105	51.33%	311	1.75%
2012	8,241	51.39%	7,610	47.46%	184	1.15%
2016	9,880	60.01%	5,666	34.41%	919	5.58%
2020	12,102	63.20%	6,693	34.95%	353	1.84%
2024	12,894	64.96%	6,682	33.67%	272	1.37%

United States Senate election results for Gratiot County, Michigan1
Year	Republican		Democratic		Third party(ies)	
Year	No.	%	No.	%	No.	%
2024	12,281	62.95%	6,648	34.07%	581	2.98%

Michigan Gubernatorial election results for Gratiot County
Year	Republican		Democratic		Third party(ies)	
Year	No.	%	No.	%	No.	%
2022	8,659	56.51%	6,285	41.01%	380	2.48%

The county government operates the jail, maintains rural roads, operates the major local courts, records deeds, mortgages, and vital records, administers public health regulations, and participates with the state in the provision of other social services. The county board of commissioners controls the budget, and has limited authority to make laws or ordinances. In Michigan, most local government functions — police and fire, building and zoning, tax assessment, street maintenance, etc. — are the responsibility of individual cities and townships.

=== Elected officials ===
- Prosecuting Attorney: Laura Bever
- Sheriff: Tom Clark
- County Clerk: Angie Thompson
- County Treasurer: Terri Ball
- Register of Deeds: Kimberlee VanHoose
- Drain Commissioner: Bernard J. Barnes

== Communities ==
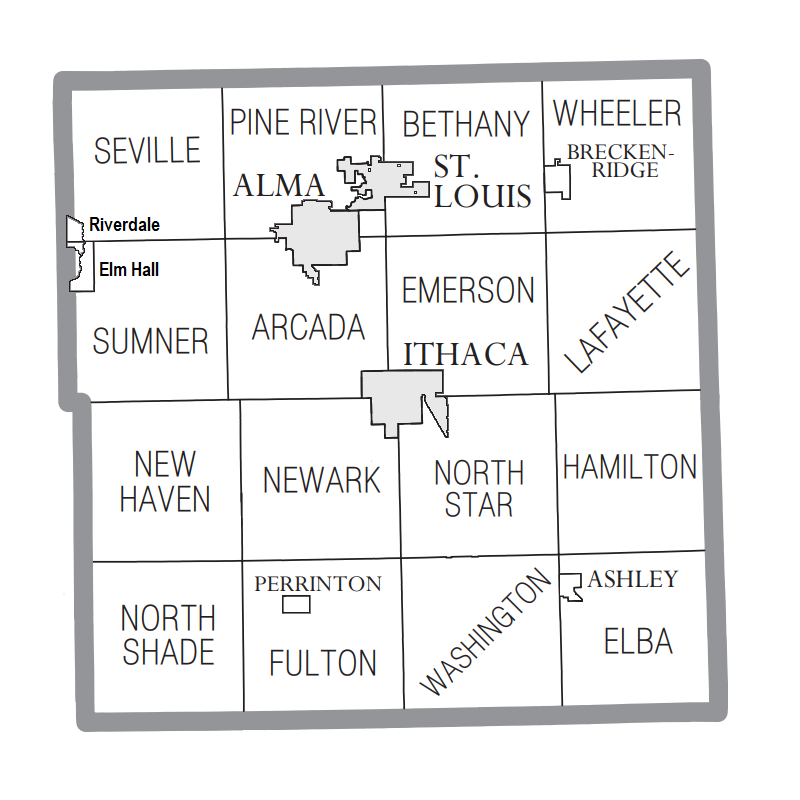
U.S. Census data map showing local municipal boundaries within Gratiot County, as well as two CDP boundaries. Shaded areas represent incorporated cities

=== Cities ===
- Alma
- Ithaca (county seat)
- St. Louis

=== Civil townships ===
- Arcada Township
- Bethany Township
- Elba Township
- Emerson Township
- Fulton Township
- Hamilton Township
- Lafayette Township
- New Haven Township
- Newark Township
- North Shade Township
- North Star Township
- Pine River Township
- Seville Township
- Sumner Township
- Washington Township
- Wheeler Township

=== Villages ===
- Ashley
- Breckenridge
- Perrinton

=== Census-designated places ===
- Elm Hall
- Riverdale

=== Unincorporated communities ===
- Bannister
- Beebe
- Edgewood
- Elwell
- Forest Hill
- Galloway
- Middleton
- Newark
- New Haven Center
- North Star
- Pompeii
- Rathbone
- Sethton
- Sumner
- Wheeler

=== Ghost towns ===
- Bridgeville
- Langport
- Ola

== Education ==
The Gratiot–Isabella Regional Education Service District, based in Ithaca, services the students in the county. The intermediate school district offers regional special education services, early education programs, and technical career pathways for students of its districts.

Gratiot County is served by the following regular public school districts:

- Alma Public Schools
- Ashley Community Schools
- Breckenridge Community Schools
- Fulton Schools
- Ithaca Public Schools
- St. Louis Public Schools

Gratiot County has the following private schools:

- Countryside Christian School (Mennonite)
- Ithaca SDA School (Seventh-day Adventist)
- St. Mary School (Roman Catholic)

== See also ==
- List of Michigan State Historic Sites in Gratiot County
- National Register of Historic Places listings in Gratiot County, Michigan
