= Ithaca, Michigan =

- City
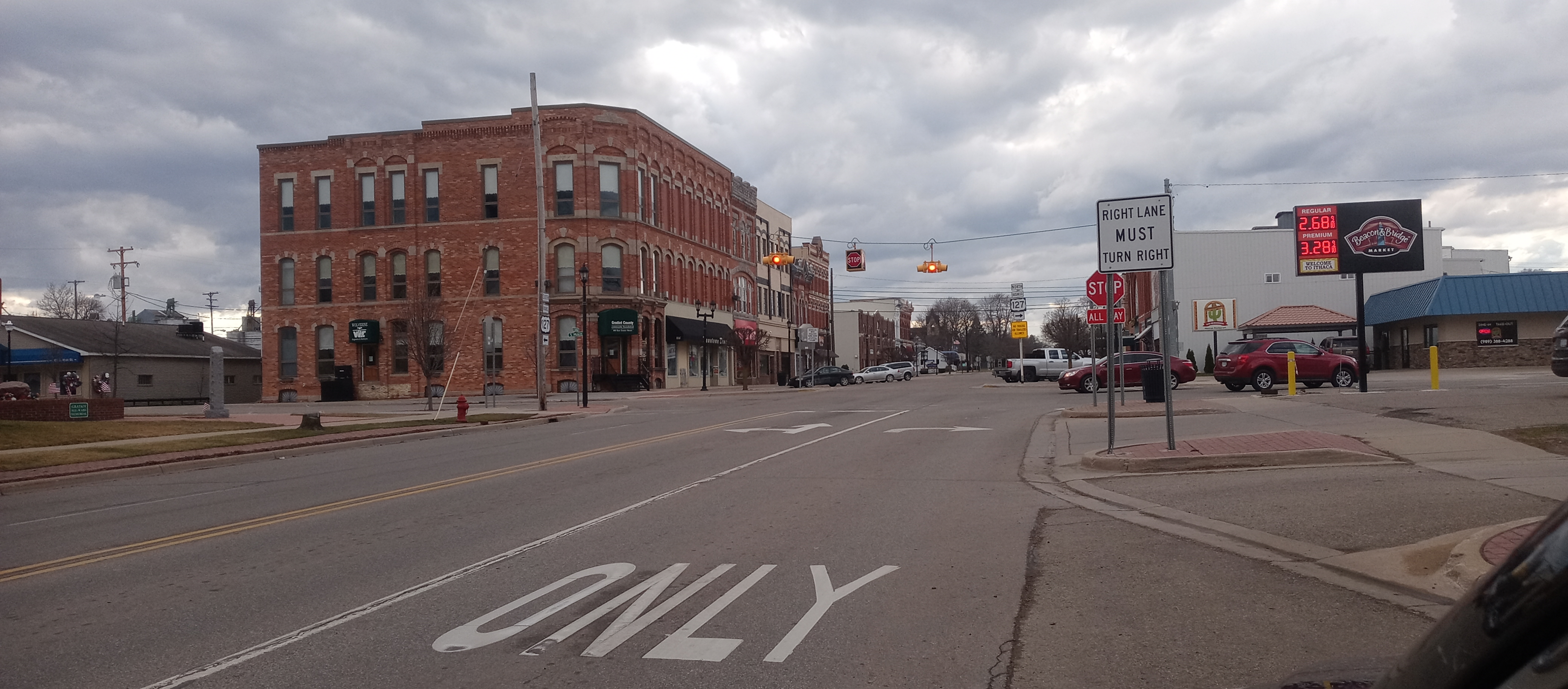
- Downtown Ithaca, Michigan

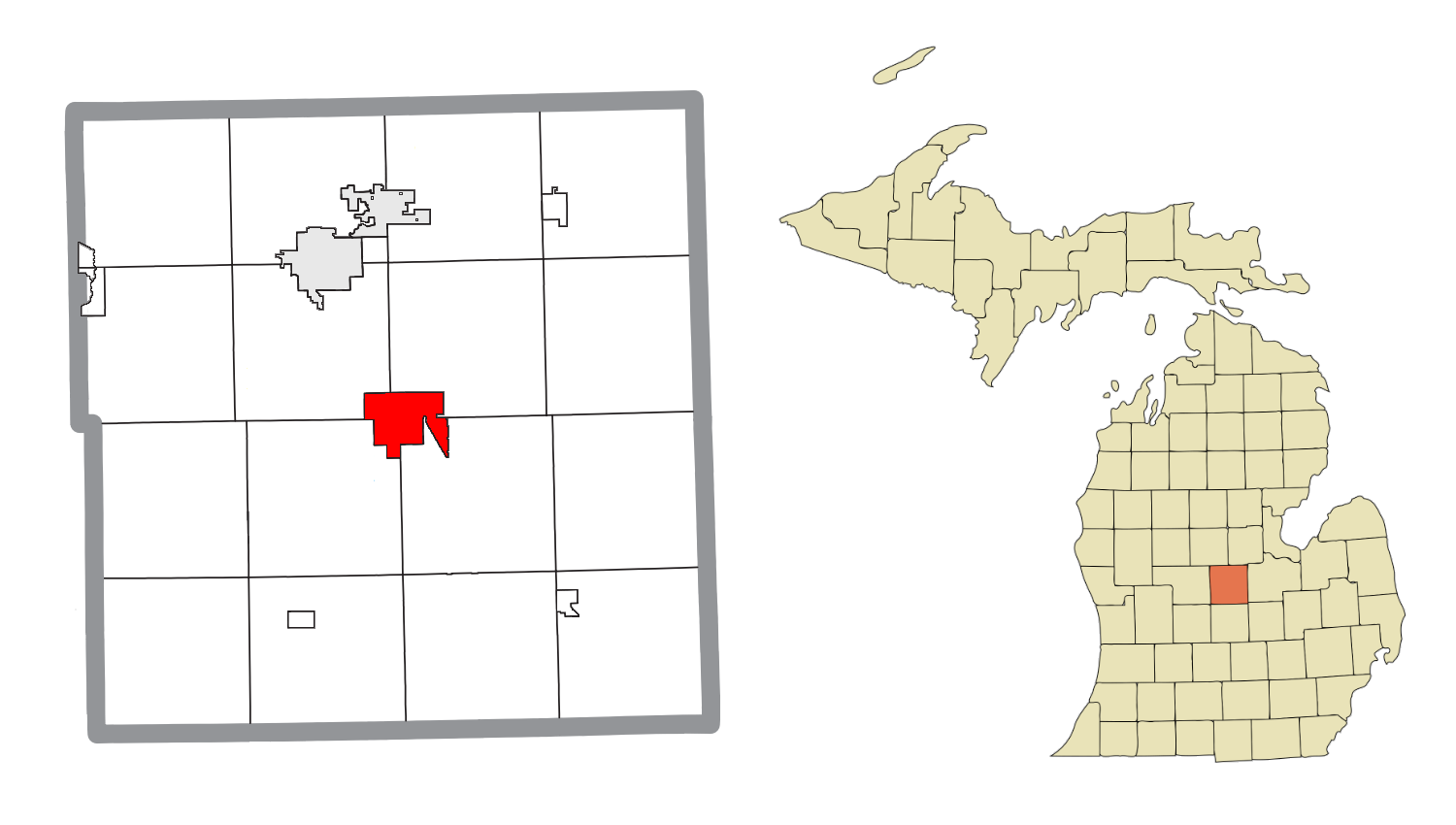
- Location within Gratiot County

- Location within the state of Michigan Location within the United States
- Coordinates: 43°17′28″N 84°36′11″W
- Country: United States
- State: Michigan
- County: Gratiot
- Founded: 1855
- Incorporated: 1869 (village); 1961 (city)

Government
  - Mayor: Alice Schafer
  - City Manager: Jamey Conn

Area
  - Total: 5.88 sq mi (15.24 km^{2})
  - Land: 5.72 sq mi (14.82 km^{2})
  - Water: 0.16 sq mi (0.41 km^{2})
- Elevation: 794 ft (242 m)

Population (2020)
  - Total: 2,853
  - Density: 498.4/sq mi (192.45/km^{2})
- Time zone: UTC-5 (Eastern (EST))
  - Summer (DST): UTC-4 (EDT)
- ZIP code: 48847
- Area code: 989
- FIPS code: 26-41340
- GNIS feature ID: 0629141
- Website: www.ithacami.com

Ithaca is a city and the county seat of Gratiot County, Michigan. It is located very near the geographical center of the state's lower peninsula. The population was 2,853 as of the 2020 census. Ithaca is run as a council-manager government. It sits at the conjunction of four townships in the center of the county: Emerson Township to the northeast, Arcada Township to the northwest, Newark Township to the southwest, and North Star Township to the southeast, but is administratively autonomous.

== Geography ==
According to the United States Census Bureau, the city has a total area of 5.28 square miles (13.68 km^{2}), of which 5.23 square miles (13.55 km^{2}) is land and 0.05 square miles (0.13 km^{2}) is water.

== Demographics ==
Historical population
Census	Pop.	Note	%±
1880	600		—
1890	1,627		171.2%
1900	2,020		24.2%
1910	1,876		−7.1%
1920	1,929		2.8%
1930	1,780		−7.7%
1940	2,000		12.4%
1950	2,377		18.9%
1960	2,611		9.8%
1970	2,749		5.3%
1980	2,950		7.3%
1990	3,009		2.0%
2000	3,098		3.0%
2010	2,910		−6.1%
2020	2,853		−2.0%
U.S. Decennial Census

=== 2020 census ===
As of the 2020 census, Ithaca had a population of 2,853. The median age was 43.8 years. 19.5% of residents were under the age of 18 and 23.0% of residents were 65 years of age or older. For every 100 females there were 92.8 males, and for every 100 females age 18 and over there were 88.8 males age 18 and over.

0.0% of residents lived in urban areas, while 100.0% lived in rural areas.

There were 1,207 households in Ithaca, of which 24.3% had children under the age of 18 living in them. Of all households, 42.4% were married-couple households, 19.6% were households with a male householder and no spouse or partner present, and 30.9% were households with a female householder and no spouse or partner present. About 34.5% of all households were made up of individuals and 17.8% had someone living alone who was 65 years of age or older.

There were 1,311 housing units, of which 7.9% were vacant. The homeowner vacancy rate was 2.9% and the rental vacancy rate was 9.5%.

Racial composition as of the 2020 census
Race	Number	Percent
White	2,607	91.4%
Black or African American	8	0.3%
American Indian and Alaska Native	14	0.5%
Asian	10	0.4%
Native Hawaiian and Other Pacific Islander	0	0.0%
Some other race	58	2.0%
Two or more races	156	5.5%
Hispanic or Latino (of any race)	181	6.3%

=== 2010 census ===
As of the census of 2010, there were 2,910 people, 1,188 households, and 765 families residing in the city. The population density was 556.4 inhabitants per square mile (214.8/km^{2}). There were 1,293 housing units at an average density of 247.2 per square mile (95.4/km^{2}). The racial makeup of the city was 94.7% White, 0.5% African American, 0.9% Native American, 0.6% Asian, 1.5% from other races, and 1.8% from two or more races. Hispanic or Latino of any race were 6.2% of the population.

There were 1,188 households, of which 31.7% had children under the age of 18 living with them, 46.0% were married couples living together, 13.7% had a female householder with no husband present, 4.6% had a male householder with no wife present, and 35.6% were non-families. 30.6% of all households were made up of individuals, and 14.9% had someone living alone who was 65 years of age or older. The average household size was 2.36 and the average family size was 2.88.

The median age in the city was 39.2 years. 23.9% of residents were under the age of 18; 8.9% were between the ages of 18 and 24; 25.2% were from 25 to 44; 26.7% were from 45 to 64; and 15.2% were 65 years of age or older. The gender makeup of the city was 47.5% male and 52.5% female.

== Transportation ==
- US 127
- Bus. US 127

== Attractions ==
=== Parks ===
Ithaca has four parks within the city limits. These include the Woodland Park, Atkinson Park, McNabb Park, and the Ithaca Dog Park. Woodland park is a large park for children, including a playscape and much playground equipment like slides and swings. The park also has a large sledding hill and an ice skating rink. Inside the Woodland park to the North end site the Ithaca Dog park which was started and finished in the summer of 2012. Atkinson Park is much quieter and is a senior favorite as it is very close to the community Senior Center and senior housing. McNabb Park can be found in the South of the town and is home to many events throughout the year, including the Gratiot Agricultural Society Expo and AYSO soccer games. McNabb park also has several biking and hiking paths to enjoy.

=== Schools ===
Ithaca has one unified public school system, which is spread out over three buildings (covering the communities of Ithaca, Sumner, North Star and the surrounding townships). The school mascot is Jack, a yellow jacket. The school's football and soccer stadium was recently renovated with funding from both public and private donors. The stadium was completed over the course of the summer of 2012 and features renovated concessions and bathroom facilities, as well as renovated seating and a new concourse. Since 1998 there has been a student exchange program with a German school, Goethe-Gymnasium Ludwigslust. Every year, a small group of students and a chaperone travel to Germany for two weeks to experience German life with their host family. They, in turn, host a German student for two weeks later in the school year.

=== National Register of Historic Places ===
The following properties and districts in Ithaca are listed on the National Register of Historic Places registry:

- Gratiot County Courthouse
- Ithaca Downtown Historic District

== History ==
Along with the Native Americans, the first recorded settler in Ithaca was James J. Bush from Howell, Michigan in 1850. John Jeffery, from New York State, bought land in 1853, and permanently relocated on the land in 1855. He platted the area in 1856, assisted by Sidney S. Hastings, calling it Gratiot Center and laying out streets, lots, blocks, and even alleys. Gratiot Center was the name of its first post office, granted on November 16, 1855 with John Knight as the first postmaster. In 1856 the site was named as the county seat of Gratiot County. The settlement's name was changed on April 13, 1857 to Ithaca, after Ithaca, New York. Ithaca was incorporated as a village in 1869 and became a city in 1961.

== Notable people from Ithaca ==
- Richard J. Allen (born 1933), former member of the Michigan Legislature and executive director of the Michigan State Fair.
- Roy Beechler (1880 – 1946), American football player and coach.
- Chris Patrick (born 1984), former pro football player.
- James M. Swift (1873 – 1946), lawyer, District Attorney of Massachusetts Southern District and Attorney General of Massachusetts.
