= New Haven Township, Gratiot County, Michigan =

New Haven Township, Michigan
- Civil township
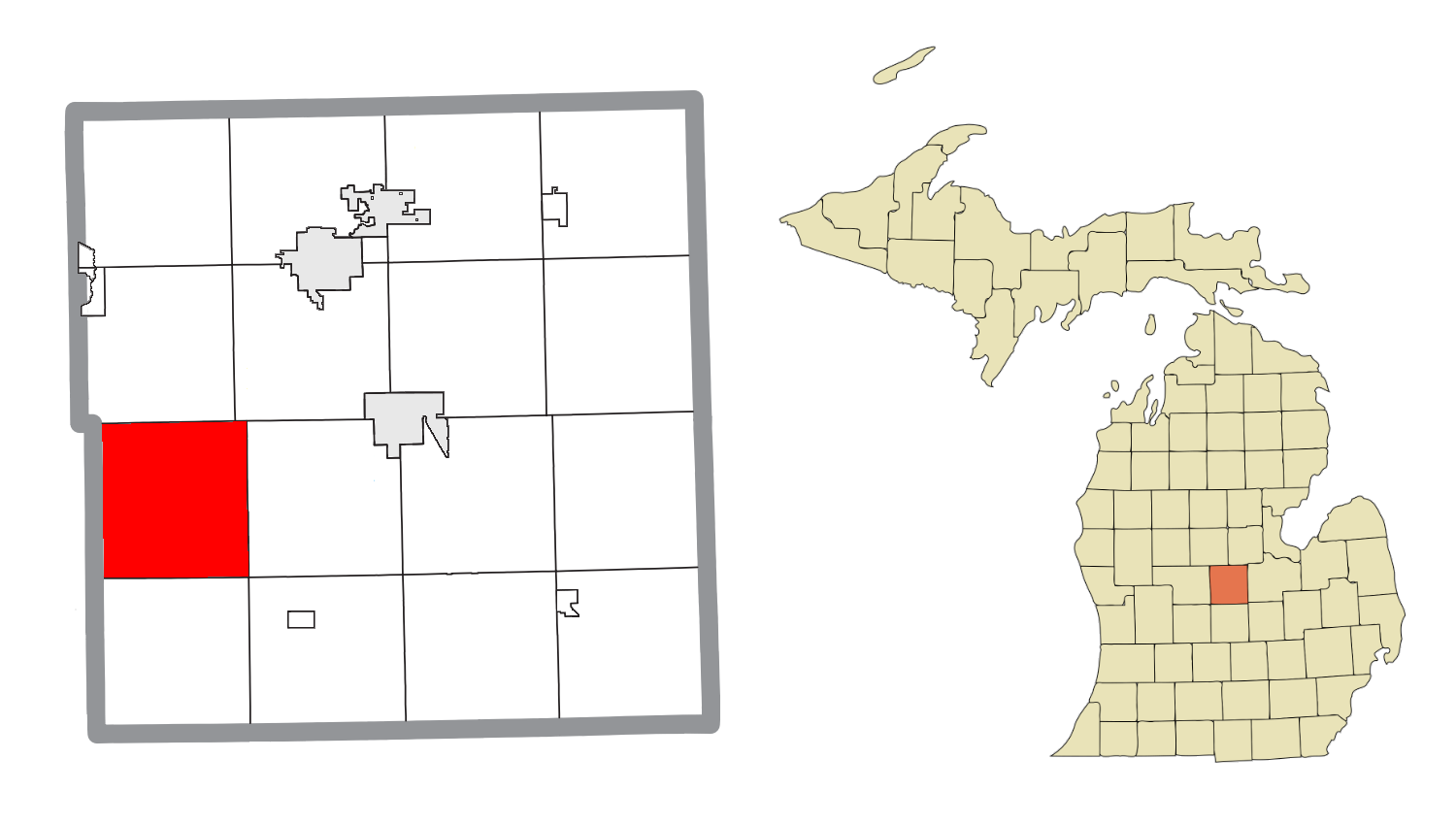
- Location within Gratiot County

- Location within the state of Michigan Location within the United States
- Coordinates: 43°14′53″N 84°46′30″W
- Country: United States
- State: Michigan
- County: Gratiot

Area
  - Total: 35.6 sq mi (92.2 km^{2})
  - Land: 35.5 sq mi (92.0 km^{2})
  - Water: 0.077 sq mi (0.2 km^{2})
- Elevation: 778 ft (237 m)

Population (2020)
  - Total: 1,064
  - Density: 30.0/sq mi (11.6/km^{2})
- Time zone: UTC-5 (Eastern (EST))
  - Summer (DST): UTC-4 (EDT)
- FIPS code: 26-57360
- GNIS feature ID: 1626801

New Haven Township is a civil township of Gratiot County in the U.S. state of Michigan. The population was 1,064 at the 2020 census.

== Communities ==
- Gardenville was the name of a post office in the western part of the township from 1895 until 1902.
- New Haven Center is an unincorporated community in the township at 43°14′56″N 84°46′38″W. A post office operated there from September 1863 until December 1904.
- Sethton is an unincorporated community in the township at 43°13′11″N 84°46′39″W. It was at first a trading point in the township, named for Seth Gardner. A post office operated from June 1882 to October 1885 and again from August 1887 to December 1904.

== Geography ==
According to the United States Census Bureau, the township has a total area of 35.6 square miles (92.2 km^{2}), of which 35.5 square miles (92.0 km^{2}) is land and 0.1 square mile (0.2 km^{2}) (0.22%) is water.

== Demographics ==
As of the census of 2000, there were 1,016 people, 351 households, and 269 families residing in the township. The population density was 28.6 inhabitants per square mile (11.0/km^{2}). There were 377 housing units at an average density of 10.6 per square mile (4.1/km^{2}). The racial makeup of the township was 99.21% White, 0.20% Native American, 0.10% from other races, and 0.49% from two or more races. Hispanic or Latino of any race were 1.38% of the population.

There were 351 households, out of which 38.7% had children under the age of 18 living with them, 69.5% were married couples living together, 4.6% had a female householder with no husband present, and 23.1% were non-families. 18.8% of all households were made up of individuals, and 6.8% had someone living alone who was 65 years of age or older. The average household size was 2.82 and the average family size was 3.23.

In the township, the population was spread out, with 30.1% under the age of 18, 6.0% from 18 to 24, 29.5% from 25 to 44, 21.0% from 45 to 64, and 13.4% who were 65 years of age or older. The median age was 37 years. For every 100 females, there were 100.4 males. For every 100 females age 18 and over, there were 100.0 males.

The median income for a household in the township was $39,048, and the median income for a family was $44,306. Males had a median income of $37,500 versus $22,292 for females. The per capita income for the township was $16,085. About 9.3% of families and 13.4% of the population were below the poverty line, including 18.3% of those under age 18 and 7.4% of those age 65 or over.
