= Newark Township, Michigan =

- Civil township
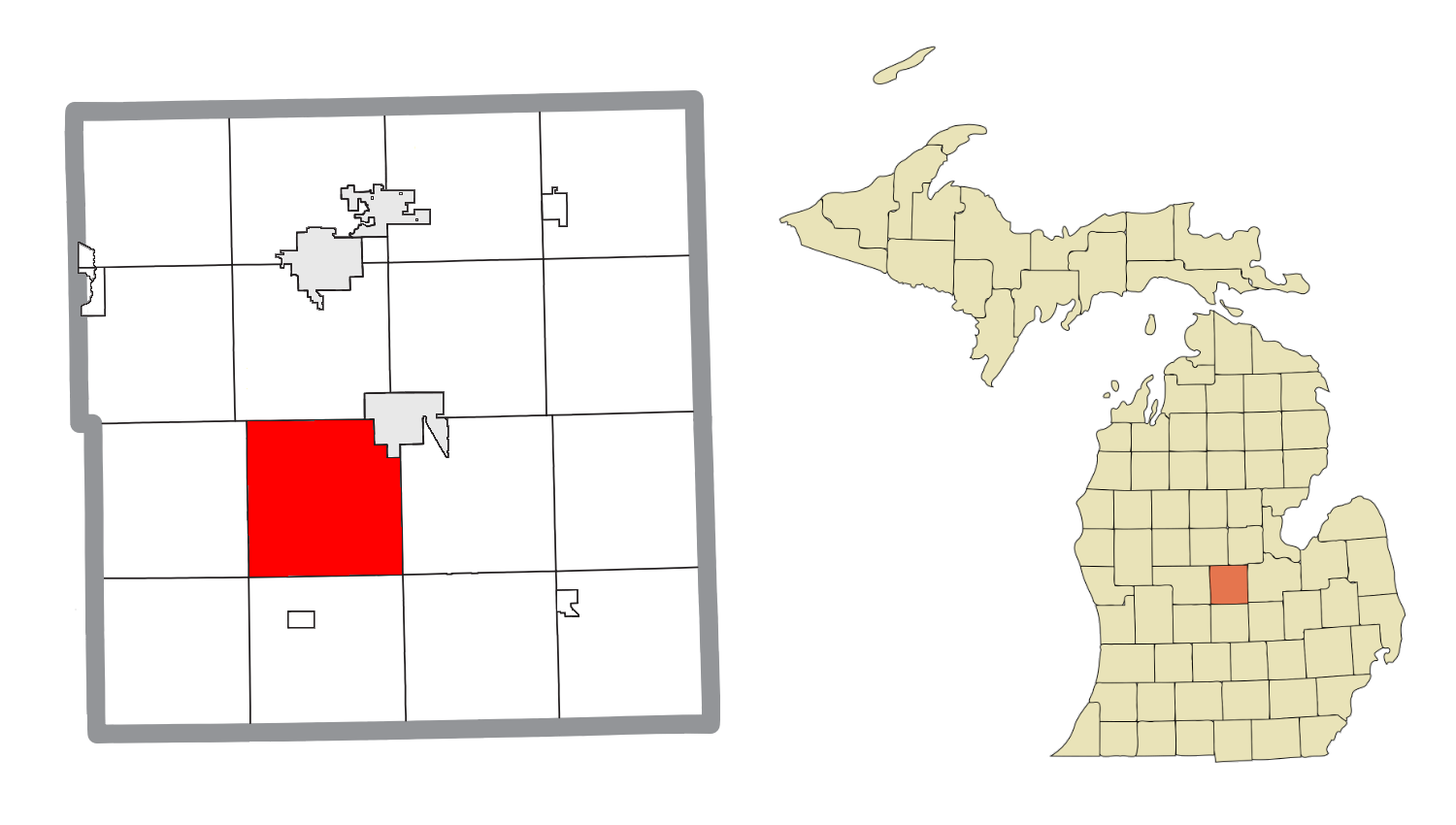
- Location within Gratiot County

- Location within the state of Michigan Location within the United States
- Coordinates: 43°14′21″N 84°39′49″W
- Country: United States
- State: Michigan
- County: Gratiot

Area
  - Total: 34.4 sq mi (89.1 km^{2})
  - Land: 34.4 sq mi (89.1 km^{2})
  - Water: 0 sq mi (0.0 km^{2})
- Elevation: 735 ft (224 m)

Population (2020)
  - Total: 1,112
  - Density: 32.3/sq mi (12.5/km^{2})
- Time zone: UTC-5 (Eastern (EST))
  - Summer (DST): UTC-4 (EDT)
- FIPS code: 26-57040
- GNIS feature ID: 1626794
- Website: https://www.newarktownship.com/

Newark Township is a civil township of Gratiot County in the U.S. state of Michigan. The population was 1,112 at the 2020 census.

== Communities ==
- The city of Ithaca is at the northeast corner of the township, but is administratively autonomous.
- Newark is an unincorporated community in the township at 43°14′55″N 84°42′35″W. A post office operated from August 1857 to May 1860 and again from December 1863 to April 1902.

== Geography ==
According to the United States Census Bureau, the township has a total area of 34.4 square miles (89 km^{2}), all land.

== Demographics ==
As of the census of 2000, there were 1,149 people, 399 households, and 314 families residing in the township. The population density was 33.4 inhabitants per square mile (12.9/km^{2}). There were 420 housing units at an average density of 12.2 per square mile (4.7/km^{2}). The racial makeup of the township was 93.91% White, 0.35% African American, 0.35% Asian, 3.31% from other races, and 2.09% from two or more races. Hispanic or Latino of any race were 4.70% of the population.

There were 399 households, out of which 36.1% had children under the age of 18 living with them, 67.9% were married couples living together, 6.0% had a female householder with no husband present, and 21.3% were non-families. 18.3% of all households were made up of individuals, and 7.5% had someone living alone who was 65 years of age or older. The average household size was 2.78 and the average family size was 3.12.

In the township the population was spread out, with 29.1% under the age of 18, 8.7% from 18 to 24, 26.2% from 25 to 44, 22.8% from 45 to 64, and 13.2% who were 65 years of age or older. The median age was 36 years. For every 100 females, there were 99.5 males. For every 100 females age 18 and over, there were 99.8 males.

The median income for a household in the township was $44,659, and the median income for a family was $49,722. Males had a median income of $33,333 versus $27,125 for females. The per capita income for the township was $17,269. About 1.9% of families and 3.2% of the population were below the poverty line, including 3.0% of those under age 18 and 7.8% of those age 65 or over.
