= National Register of Historic Places listings in Gratiot County, Michigan =

Location of Gratiot County in Michigan

This is a list of the National Register of Historic Places listings in Gratiot County, Michigan.

This is intended to be a complete list of the properties and districts on the National Register of Historic Places in Gratiot County, Michigan, United States. Latitude and longitude coordinates are provided for many National Register properties and districts; these locations may be seen together in a map.

There are 10 properties and districts listed on the National Register in the county.

This National Park Service list is complete through NPS recent listings posted February 20, 2026.

== Current listings ==
	Name on the Register	Image	Date listed	Location	City or town	Description
1	Alma Downtown Historic District	Alma Downtown Historic District	December 11, 2013 (#13000904)	Superior and State Streets; 43°22′44″N 84°39′43″W	Alma	The Alma Downtown Historic District contains 72 structures, primarily brick commercial buildings, ranging from one to three stories in height and dating from 1874 (and likely earlier) to the 1960s.
2	Brown Site (20GR21)		September 19, 1985 (#85002411)	Pine River near Tyler Road; 43°20′30″N 84°42′00″W	Alma	The Brown Site is an archaeological site, located along the Pine River, that was the location of a late Woodland period village dating to about AD 1000.
3	Conservation Park Site (20GR33)		September 30, 1985 (#85002695)	Pine River Park, Alma, Michigan; 43°22′15″N 84°40′15″W	Alma	The Conservation Park Site, also known as the Pine River Park Site, is an archaeological site located along the Pine River that was the location of an early Woodland period camp.
4	Gratiot County Courthouse	Gratiot County Courthouse	January 31, 1976 (#76002291)	Center St. 43°17′27″N 84°36′17″W	Ithaca	The Gratiot County Courthouse was constructed in 1900-02 from plans drawn by architect Claire Allen. It is a 2-1/2-story Classical Revival structure covered in beige sandstone with a distinctive multi-stage clock tower topped with a belfry.
5	Holiday Park Site (20GR91)		December 6, 1985 (#85003519)	Holiday Park; 43°22′15″N 84°40′00″W	Alma	The Holiday Park Site is an archaeological site that was the location of a Late Woodland period village.
6	Ithaca Downtown Historic District	Ithaca Downtown Historic District	December 21, 2005 (#05001510)	100-168 and 101-161 E. Center St. 43°17′30″N 84°36′24″W	Ithaca	The Ithaca Downtown Historic District encompasses 15 commercial structures, the entire 100 block of East Center Street.
7	Lincoln Road–Pine River Bridge	Lincoln Road–Pine River Bridge	December 9, 1999 (#99001516)	Lincoln Rd. over the Pine River; 43°22′45″N 84°49′59″W	Seville Township	This bridge is notable for being a large early example of an arched through girder bridge in Michigan, and for sitting on substantially skewed abutments. It was demolished and replaced in 2009.
8	Dr. Charles H. MacLachlan Sanitarium and House	Dr. Charles H. MacLachlan Sanitarium and House	November 22, 1982 (#82000533)	6482 Pingree Rd. 43°23′09″N 84°44′47″W	Elwell	The MacLachlan Sanitarium is a stone facility built in 1908 by Dr. Charles H. MacLachlan, a proponent of "physiological therapeutics," a treatment of chronic diseases without the use of medication. It also served as a local hospital.
9	Saint Louis Downtown Historic District	Saint Louis Downtown Historic District	December 3, 2014 (#14000976)	N. Mill St., W. Saginaw & W. Center Aves. 43°24′35″N 84°36′32″W	Saint Louis	
10	Wright Opera House Block Complex	Wright Opera House Block Complex	June 26, 2013 (#13000443)	101–113 E. Superior St., 408 N. State St. 43°22′45″N 84°39′41″W	Alma	The Wright Opera House Block, also known as the 'Alma Opera House Block, was built in 1880 by lumberman Ammi Willard Wright. It is a large brick building houseing five commercial spaces on the first floor, and a performance space and offices on the upper floors. The 1899 Lancashire Building addition is integral to the original building.

== See also ==
- List of National Historic Landmarks in Michigan
- National Register of Historic Places listings in Michigan
- Listings in neighboring counties: Clinton, Ionia, Isabella, Midland, Montcalm, Saginaw, Shiawassee
