= Elm Hall, Michigan =

- Census-designated place (CDP) & unincorporated community
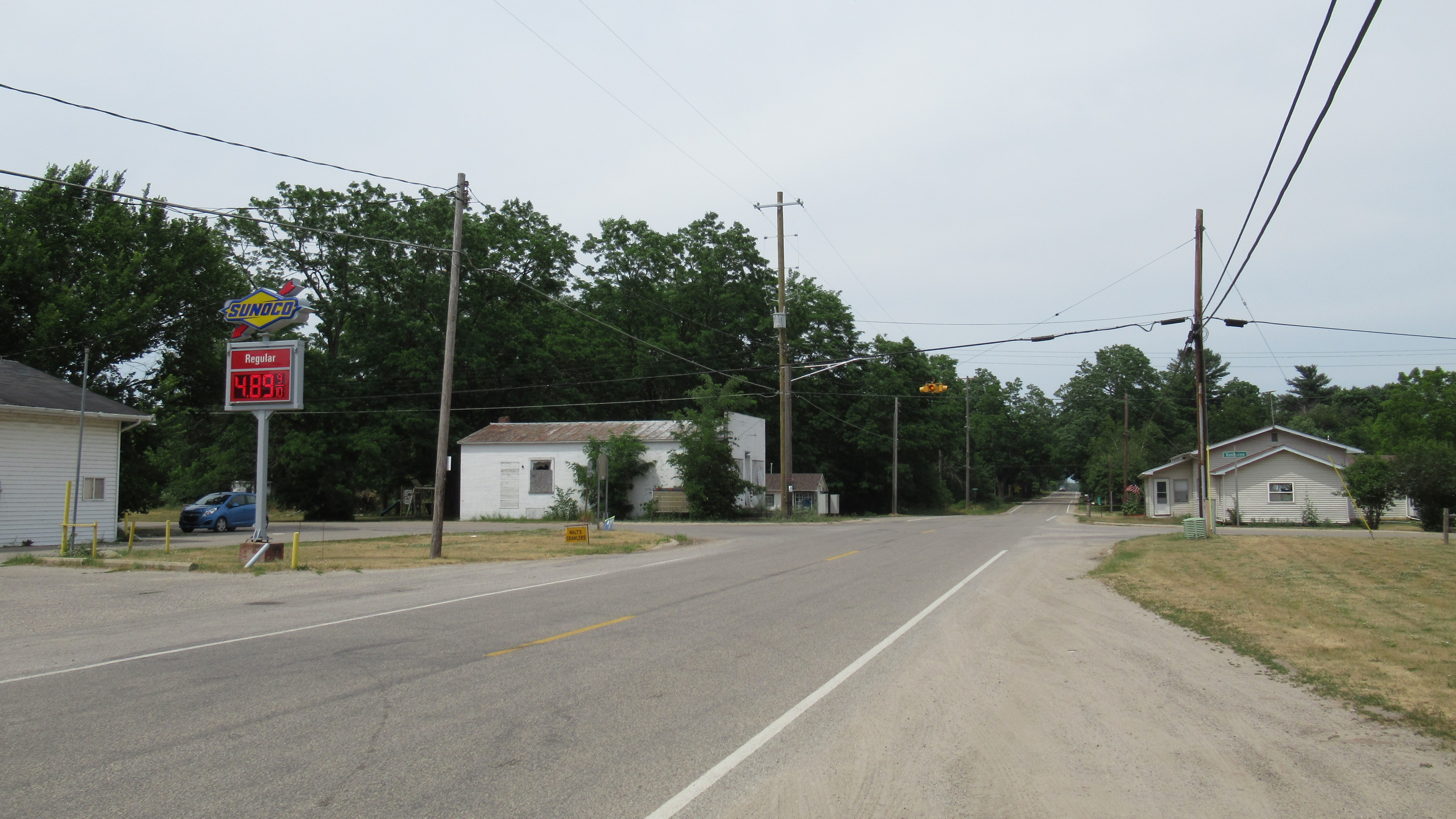
- Intersection of Van Buren and Lumberjack

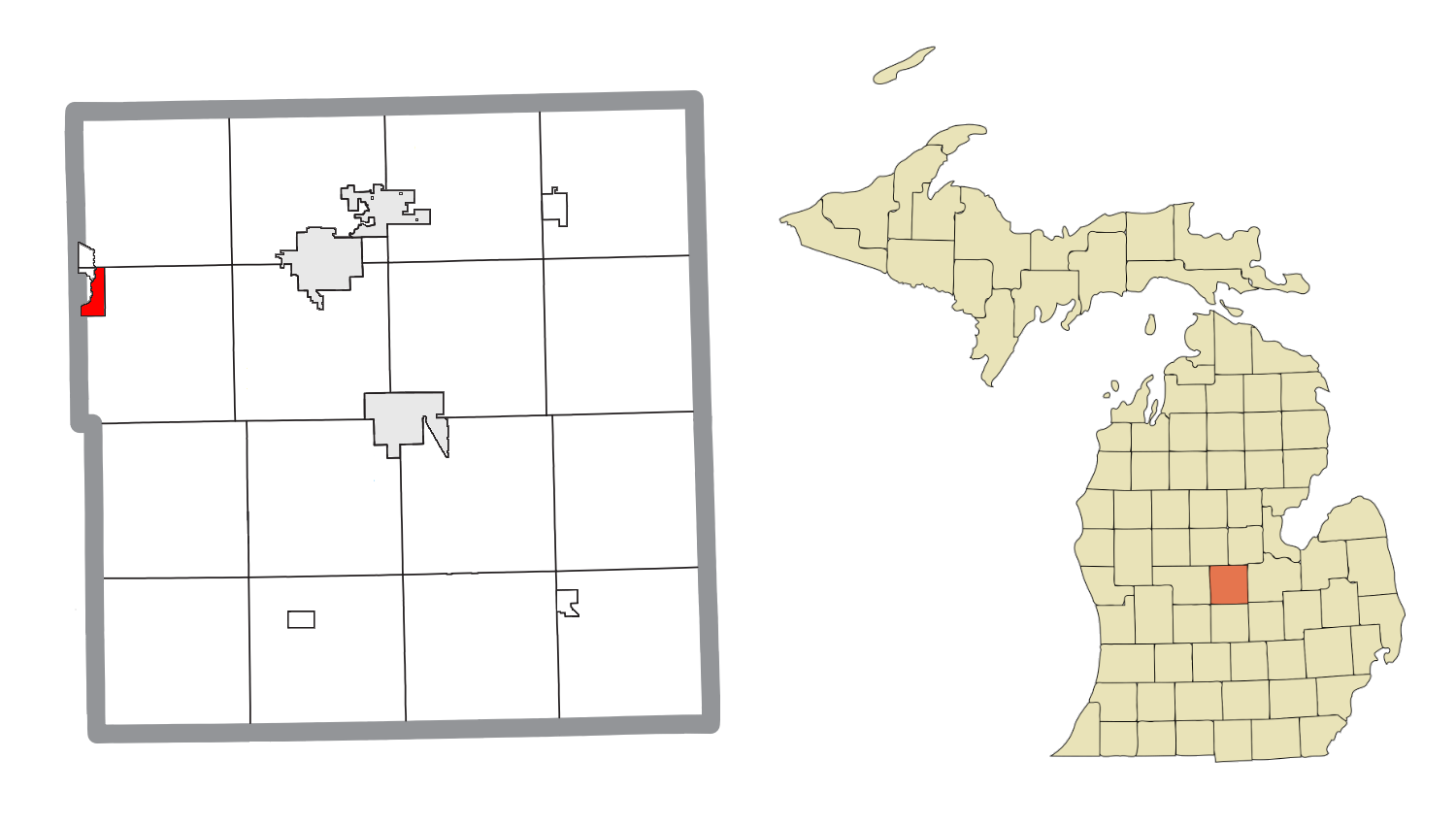
- Location within Gratiot County

- Location within the state of Michigan Location within the United States
- Coordinates: 43°21′54″N 84°50′07″W
- Country: United States
- State: Michigan
- County: Gratiot
- Township: Sumner
- Settled: 1855
- Platted: 1863

Area
  - Total: 1.41 sq mi (3.65 km^{2})
  - Land: 1.40 sq mi (3.63 km^{2})
  - Water: 0.012 sq mi (0.03 km^{2})
- Elevation: 797 ft (243 m)

Population (2020)
  - Total: 279
  - Density: 199.29/sq mi (76.95/km^{2})
- Time zone: UTC-5 (Eastern (EST))
  - Summer (DST): UTC-4 (EDT)
- ZIP code(s): 48830; 48877 (Riverdale)
- Area code: 989
- GNIS feature ID: 625508

Elm Hall is an unincorporated community and census-designated place (CDP) in Gratiot County in the U.S. state of Michigan. The CDP had a population of 279 at the 2020 census. The community is located within Sumner Township.

As an unincorporated community, Elm Hall has no legal autonomy of its own but does have its own post office with the 48830 ZIP Code.

== History ==
Elm Hall was first settled in 1855 by brothers Jacob, Michael, and Nathaniel Strayer and their families. Sumner Township was established that same year. The families all lived in a long building (or hall) that was made out of elm logs, and the community name became known as Elm Hall. A post office was established on August 18, 1857 with Baron Blanchard serving as the first postmaster. The community was platted and recorded in 1863.

For the 2020 census, Elm Hall was included as a newly-listed census-designated place. Elm Hall continues to remain an unincorporated community with no legal autonomy of its own.

== Geography ==
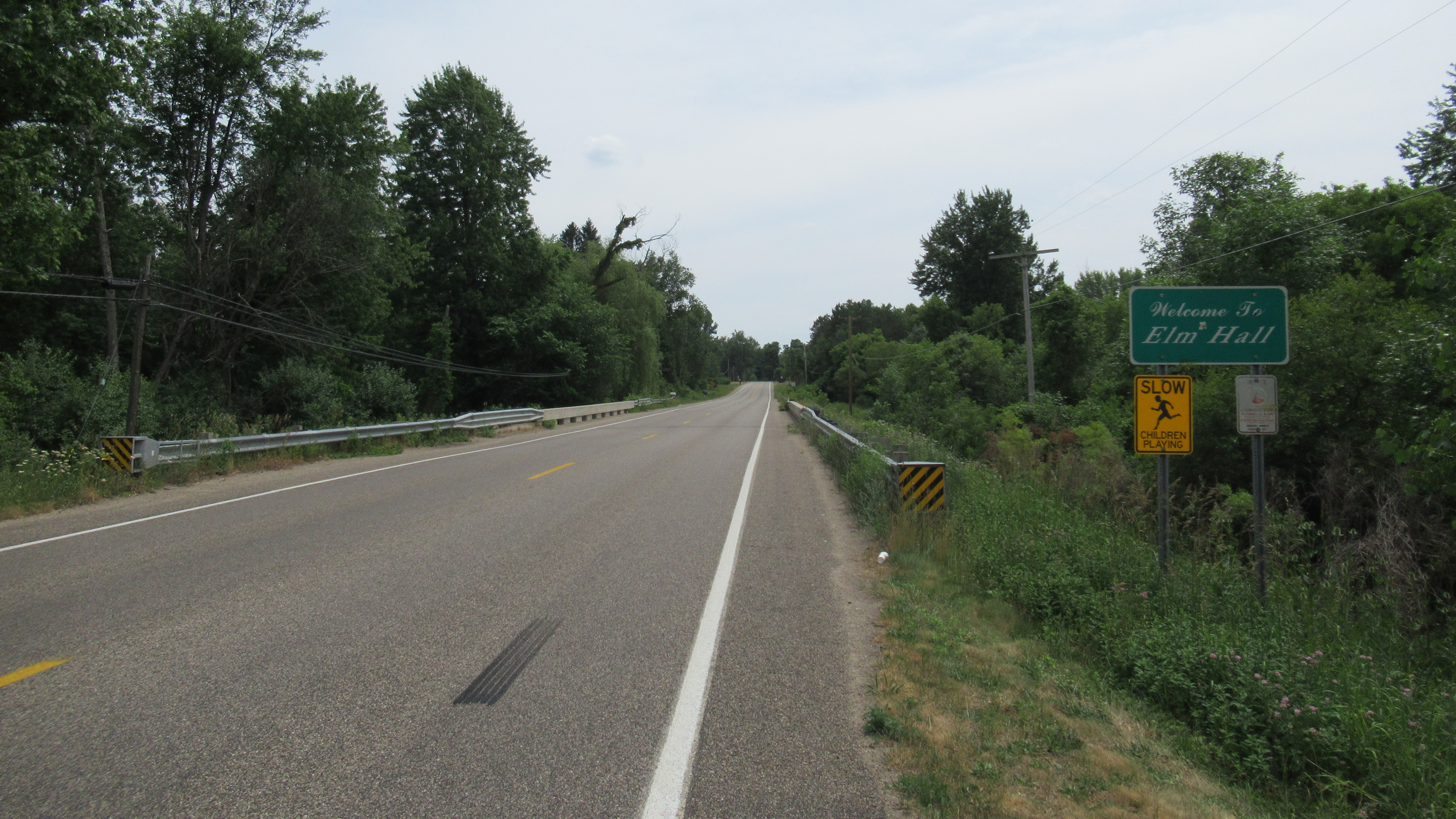
Road signage along Lumberjack Road

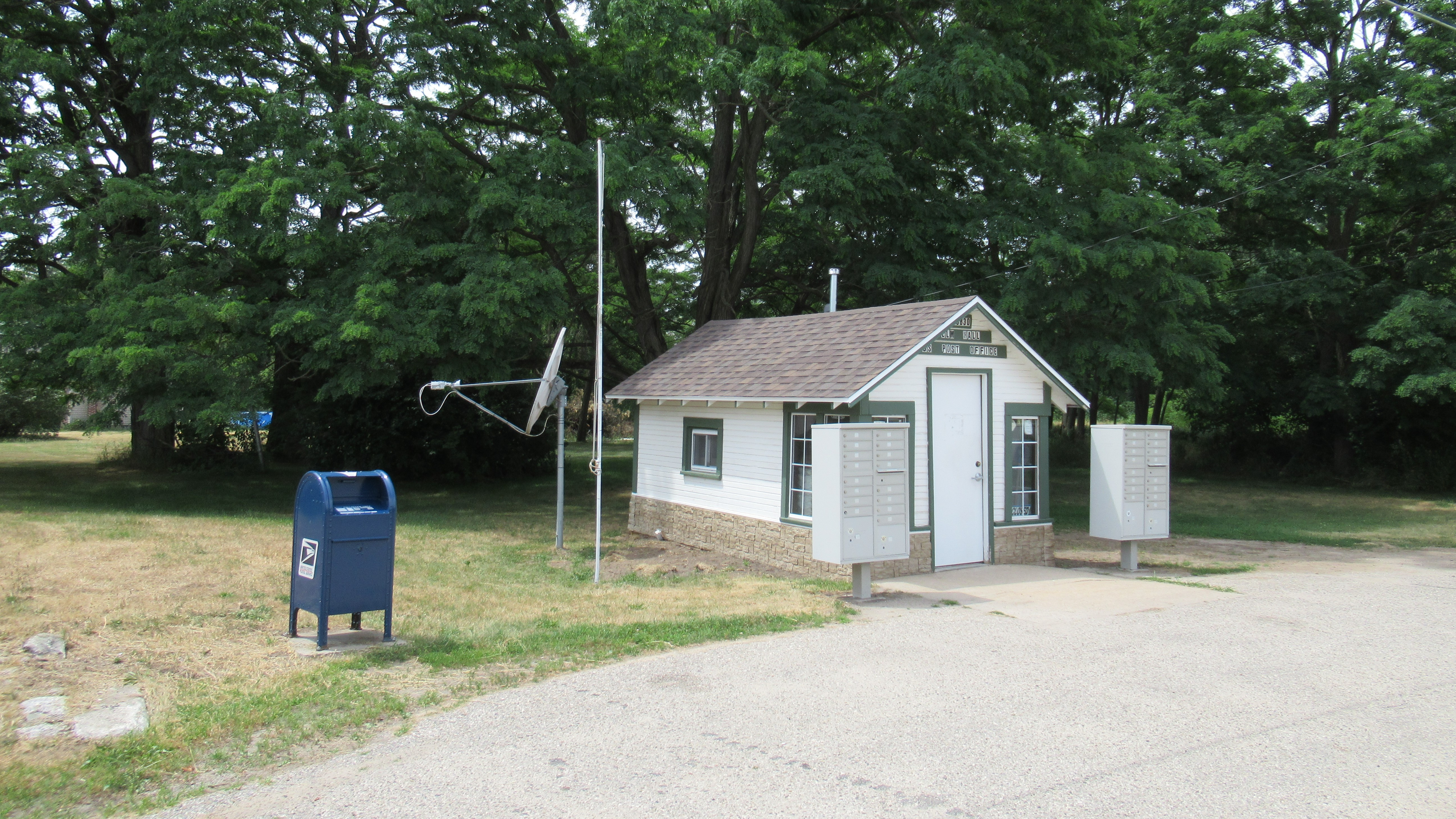
U.S. Post Office in Elm Hall

According to the U.S. Census Bureau, the Elm Hall CDP has a total area of 1.41 square miles (3.65 km^{2}), of which 1.40 square miles (3.63 km^{2}) is land and 0.01 square miles (0.03 km^{2}) (0.71%) is water.

Elm Hall is centrally located in the state's Lower Peninsula about 20 miles (32 km) south of Mount Pleasant and 60 miles (97 km) north of the capital city of Lansing. The community is centered along North Lumberjack Road and West Van Buren Road in the northwest corner of Sumner Township about 3.0 miles (4.8 km) south of M-46. The Pine River flows through the community.

Other nearby unincorporated communities include Riverdale to the north, Sumner to the south, Vestaburg to the northwest, and Elwell to the northeast. The city of Alma is about 10 miles (16 km) to the east.

The Elm Hall post office uses the 48830 ZIP Code and is primarily for post office box services only. The post office is located at 5025 North Lumberjack Road in the center of the community. The surrounding area uses the Riverdale 48877 ZIP Code post office located to the north in the community of Riverdale. The Elm Hall post office is unofficially considered the smallest post office building in the state of Michigan. It may be among the smallest active post office buildings in the United States after the Silver Lake post office, the Salvo Post Office, and the Ochopee Post Office.

== Demographics ==
- Age:
  - The median age in Elm Hall is 45.6, which is about 20 percent higher than the figure for the Alma, MI Micro Area (39.6) and approximately 10 percent higher than the figure for Michigan (39.9).
  - Population by age range:
    - 0-9: 2%
    - 10-19: 11%
    - 20-29: 20%
    - 30-39: 9%
    - 40-49: 14%
    - 50-59: 6%
    - 60-69: 15%
    - 70-79: 12%
    - 80+: 6%
- Sex:
  - Female: 51%
  - Male: 49%
- Race & Ethnicity:
  - White: 96%
  - Black: 0%
  - Native: 1%
  - Asian: 0%
  - Islander: 0%
  - Other: 0%
  - Hispanic: 3% (Hispanic includes respondents of any race)
- Economics:
  - Per capita income: Elm Hall’s per capita income is about two-thirds of the amount in the Alma, MI Micro Area ($19,002 vs. $28,123) and about half the amount in Michigan ($19,002 vs. $37,929).
  - Median household income:
    - Under $50K: 26%
    - $50K - $100K: 11%
    - $100K - $200K: 0%
    - Over $200K: 0%
  - Poverty rate: 50.3% of Elm Hall residents are below the poverty line, more than double the rate in the Alma, MI Micro Area (14.1%) and Michigan (13.1%).
- Transportation to work:
  - Mean travel time to work: 65.5 minutes, more than double the figure in the Alma, MI Micro Area (24.6 minutes) and Michigan (24.5 minutes).
  - Means of transportation to work:
    - Drove alone: 100%
    - Carpooled: 0%
    - Public transit: 0%
    - Bicycle: 0%
    - Walked: 0%
    - Worked at home: 0%
- Households:
  - Number of households: 88
  - Persons per household: 2.1
  - Female householders: 37%
  - Married couples: 31%
  - Male householders: 32%
  - Non-family households: 0%
- Marital status:
  - Married: 31%
  - Never married: 22% (male) / 25% (female)
  - Now married: 32% (male) / 31% (female)
  - Divorced: 37% (male) / 16% (female)
  - Widowed: 9% (male) / 28% (female)
- Fertility:
  - Women aged 15-50 who gave birth during the past year: N/A

Historical population
Census	Pop.	Note	%±
2020	279		—
U.S. Decennial Census

== Education ==
The community of Elm Hall is served by Alma Public Schools to the east in the city of Alma.
