= Michigan's 89th House of Representatives district =

American legislative district

Michigan's 89th State House of Representatives district
Representative
Luke Meerman; R–Coopersville
- Demographics: 88.1% White; 1.7% Black; 5% Hispanic; 0.6% Asian; 0.2% Native American; 0.2% Other; 4.2% Multiracial
- Population (2024): 94,188

Michigan's 89th House of Representatives district (also referred to as Michigan's 89th House district) is a legislative district within the Michigan House of Representatives located in parts of Kent, Muskegon, and Ottawa counties. The district was created in 1965, when the Michigan House of Representatives district naming scheme changed from a county-based system to a numerical one.

== List of representatives ==
Representative	Party	Dates	Residence	Notes
Stanley M. Powell	Republican	1965–1972	Ionia	
John Engler	Republican	1973–1978	Mt. Pleasant	
Gary L. Randall	Republican	1979–1992	Elwell	
Leon E. Stille	Republican	1993–1994	Spring Lake	
Jon Jellema	Republican	1995–2000	Grand Haven	
Barb Vander Veen	Republican	2001–2006	Allendale	
Arlan Meekhof	Republican	2007–2010	West Olive	
Amanda Price	Republican	2011–2016	Holland	
Jim Lilly	Republican	2017–2022	Holland	Lived in Park Township until around 2019.
Luke Meerman	Republican	2023–present	Coopersville	
Joe Moss	Republican	(Note: Member-elect.)	Hudsonville	

== Recent elections ==
=== 2020s ===
2026 Michigan House of Representatives election
Party	Candidate	Votes	%
Republican	Joe Moss	26,898	62.42
Democratic	Meegan Zickus	16,192	37.58
Total votes		43,090	100
Republican hold			

2024 Michigan House of Representatives election
Party	Candidate	Votes	%
Republican	Luke Meerman	35,147	69.3
Democratic	Lois Maassen	15,563	30.7
Total votes		50,710	100
Republican hold			

2022 Michigan House of Representatives election
Party	Candidate	Votes	%
Republican	Luke Meerman	27,497	69.0
Democratic	Sharon McConnon	12,374	31.0
Total votes		39,871	100
Republican hold			

2020 Michigan House of Representatives election
Party	Candidate	Votes	%
Republican	Jim Lilly	36,345	61.7
Democratic	Anita Brown	22,578	38.3
Total votes		58,923	100
Republican hold			

2018 Michigan House of Representatives election
Party	Candidate	Votes	%
Republican	Jim Lilly	27,917	62.1
Democratic	Jerry Sias	17,061	37.9
Total votes		44,978	100
Republican hold			

2016 Michigan House of Representatives election
Party	Candidate	Votes	%
Republican	Jim Lilly	30,340	61.1
Democratic	Tim Meyer	17,051	34.4
Libertarian	Mary Buzuma	2,231	4.5
Total votes		49,622	100
Republican hold			

2014 Michigan House of Representatives election
Party	Candidate	Votes	%
Republican	Amanda Price	21,804	67.9
Democratic	Don Bergman	10,316	32.1
Total votes		32,120	100
Republican hold			

2012 Michigan House of Representatives election
Party	Candidate	Votes	%
Republican	Amanda Price	29,776	65.7
Democratic	Don Bergman	15,530	34.3
Total votes		45,306	100
Republican hold			

2010 Michigan House of Representatives election
Party	Candidate	Votes	%
Republican	Amanda Price	22,151	69.6
Democratic	Don Bergman	8,553	26.9
Libertarian	Terry Ashcraft	1,127	3.5
Total votes		31,831	100
Republican hold			

2008 Michigan House of Representatives election
Party	Candidate	Votes	%
Republican	Arlan Meekhof	28,927	60.8
Democratic	Tim Winslow	16,529	34.7
Libertarian	Terry Ashcraft	2,117	4.5
Total votes		47,573	100
Republican hold			

== Historical district boundaries ==
Map	Description	Apportionment Plan	Notes
	Barry County (part): Assyria Township; Carlton Township; Castleton Township; Hastings; Hastings Township; Irving Township; Maple Grove Township; Rutland Township; Thornapple Township; Woodland Township; Ionia County Kent County (part): Bowne Township; Grattan Township; Lowell; Lowell Township; Vergennes Township	1964 Apportionment Plan	
	Clare County (part): Clare; Sheridan Township; Gratiot County (part): Alma; Arcada Township; Pine River Township; Seville Township; Sumner Township; St. Louis (part); Isabella County (part): Excluding; Broomfield Township; Coldwater Township; Gilmore Township; Montcalm County (part): Bloomer Township; Bushnell Township; Crystal Township; Day Township; Evergreen Township; Ferris Township; Home Township; Richland Township; Sidney Township; Stanton (part)	1972 Apportionment Plan	
	Clinton County Gratiot County (part): Alma; Arcada Township; Elba Township; Emerson Township; Fulton Township; Hamilton Township; Ithaca; Lafayette Township; Newark Township; New Haven Township; North Shade Township; North Star Township; Pine River Township (part); Seville Township; Sumner Township; Washington Township; Wheeler Township	1982 Apportionment Plan	
	Ottawa County (part): Allendale Township; Chester Township; Coopersville; Crockery Township; Ferrysburg; Georgetown Township; Grand Haven; Grand Haven Township; Polkton Township; Spring Lake Township; Wright Township	1992 Apportionment Plan	
	Ottawa County (part): Allendale Township; Ferrysburg; Grand Haven; Grand Haven Township; Olive Township; Park Township; Port Sheldon Township; Robinson Township; Spring Lake Township	2001 Apportionment Plan	
	Ottawa County (part): Blendon Township; Crockery Township; Ferrysburg; Grand Haven; Grand Haven Township; Olive Township; Park Township; Port Sheldon Township; Robinson Township; Spring Lake Township	2011 Apportionment Plan	
