= Alma Public Schools =

School district in Michigan

Address
- 1500 N. Pine Avenue Alma, Gratiot, Michigan, 48801; United States

District information
- Grades: Pre-Kindergarten-12
- Superintendent: Stacey Criner
- Schools: 5
- Budget: $31,801,000 2022-2023 expenditures
- NCES District ID: 2602640

Students and staff
- Students: 1,815 (2024-2025)
- Teachers: 117.12 (on an FTE basis) (2024-2025)
- Staff: 302.71 FTE (2024-2025)
- Student–teacher ratio: 15.5 (2024-2025)

Other information
- Website: www.almaschools.net

Alma Public Schools is a public school district in Gratiot County, Michigan. It serves Alma and parts of the townships of Arcada, Emerson, Pine River, Seville, and Sumner. It also serves parts of the townships of Ferris and Richland in Montcalm County.

== History ==
The first school in Alma was established in 1855. At the corner of Gratiot and Center Streets, a two-story, four-classroom frame school was built in 1868. A Union School was built in 1885 at Court and Superior Streets.

On the block bordered by Hastings, Pine, Downie and Gratiot Streets, a high school was built in 1912. It was replaced by the current high school in fall 1970, becoming the district's middle school. Guido A. Binda was the architect of the 1970 high school building. A performing arts center that seats 1,610 was built at the high school in 2000.

When the current middle school was built as part of the 2004 construction bond program, the former middle school/high school from 1912 was demolished. In 2007, a boy walking across the site found a class ring from 1918 in the dirt and sought to return it to the family of its owner.

== Schools ==
Schools in Alma Public Schools district
School	Address	Notes
Alma High School	1500 N. Pine Ave., Alma	Grades 9–12
Donald L. Pavlik Middle School	1700 N. Pine Ave., Alma	Grades 6–8
Pine Avenue Elementary	1025 N. Pine Ave., Alma	Grades 4–5
Hillcrest Elementary	515 Elizabeth St., Alma	Grades 1-3
Luce Road Early Childhood Center	535 N. Luce Rd., Alma	Grades PreK-K
