= Riverdale, Michigan =

- Census-designated place (CDP) & unincorporated community
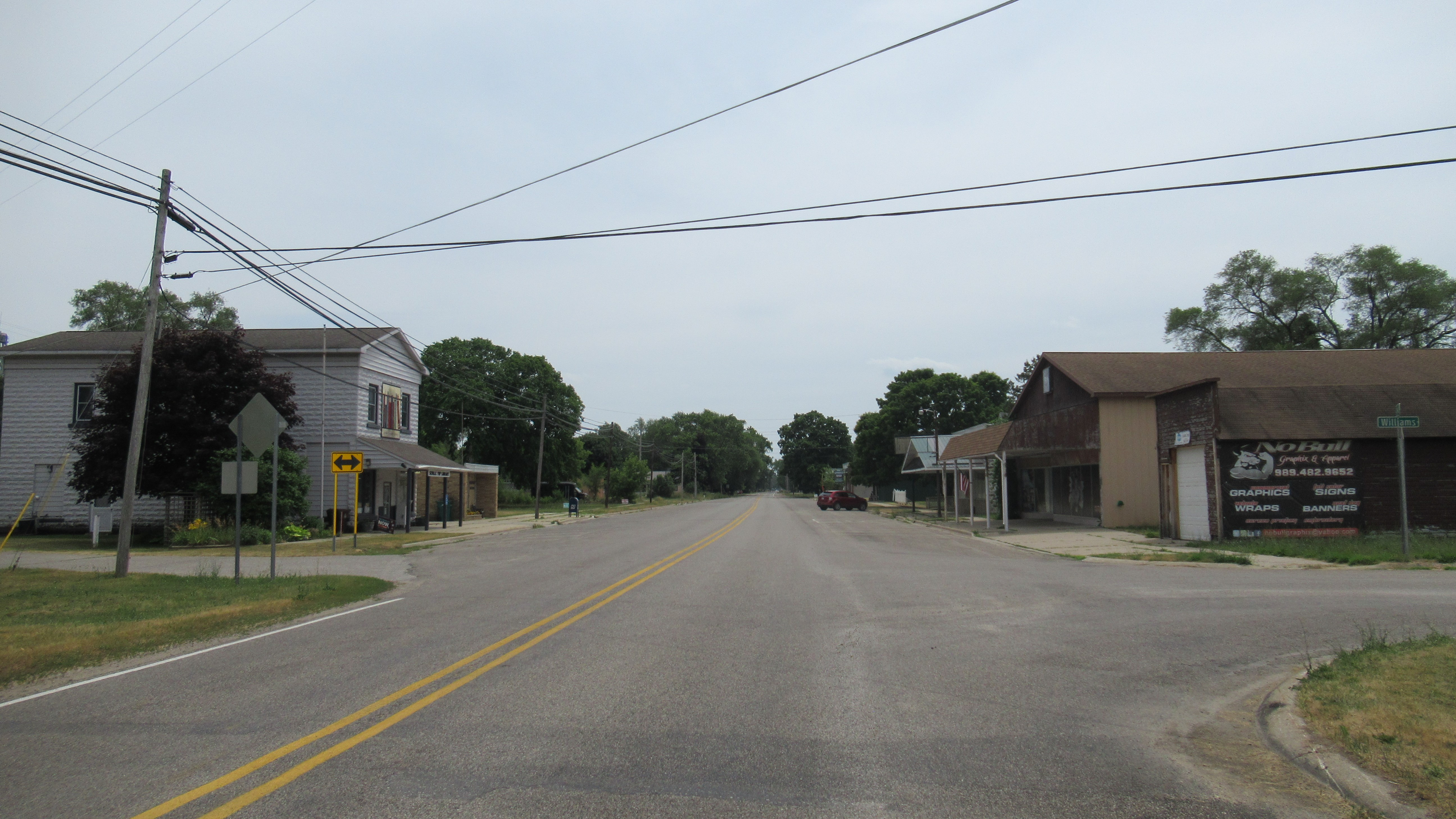
- Looking south along Lumberjack Road

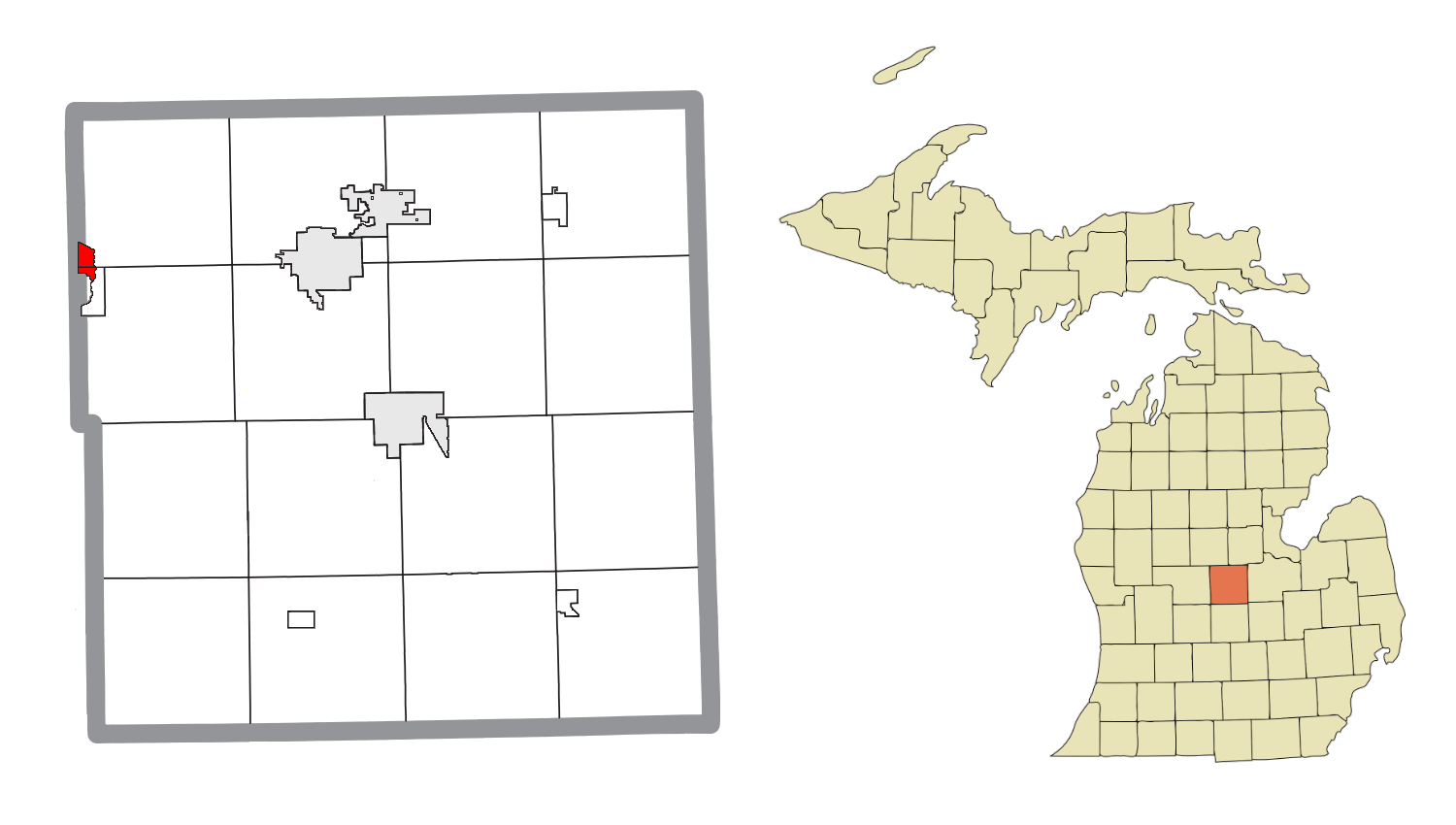
- Location within Gratiot County

- Location within the state of Michigan Location within the United States
- Coordinates: 43°23′11″N 84°50′09″W
- Country: United States
- State: Michigan
- County: Gratiot
- Townships: Seville and Sumner
- Settled: 1874
- Platted: 1875

Area
  - Total: 0.70 sq mi (1.81 km^{2})
  - Land: 0.69 sq mi (1.79 km^{2})
  - Water: 0.012 sq mi (0.03 km^{2})
- Elevation: 791 ft (241 m)

Population (2020)
  - Total: 281
  - Density: 407.25/sq mi (157.24/km^{2})
- Time zone: UTC-5 (Eastern (EST))
  - Summer (DST): UTC-4 (EDT)
- ZIP code(s): 48877
- Area code: 989
- GNIS feature ID: 635974

Riverdale is an unincorporated community and census-designated place (CDP) in Gratiot County in the U.S. state of Michigan. The population of the CDP was 281 at the 2020 census. The community is located within Seville Township with a small portion extending south into Sumner Township.

As an unincorporated community, Riverdale has no legal autonomy of its own but does have its own post office with the 48877 ZIP Code.

== Geography ==
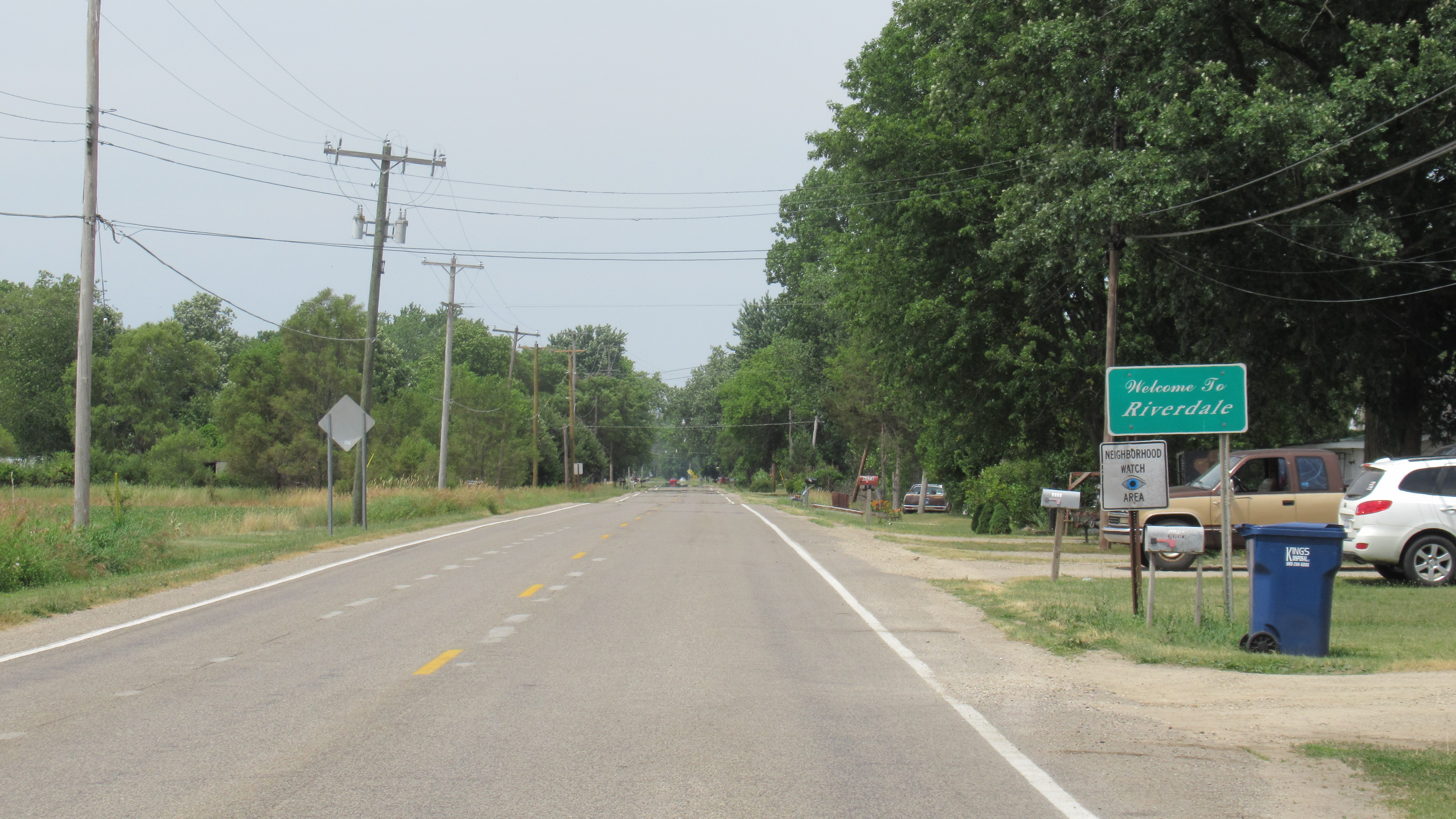
Road signage along N. Lumberjack Road

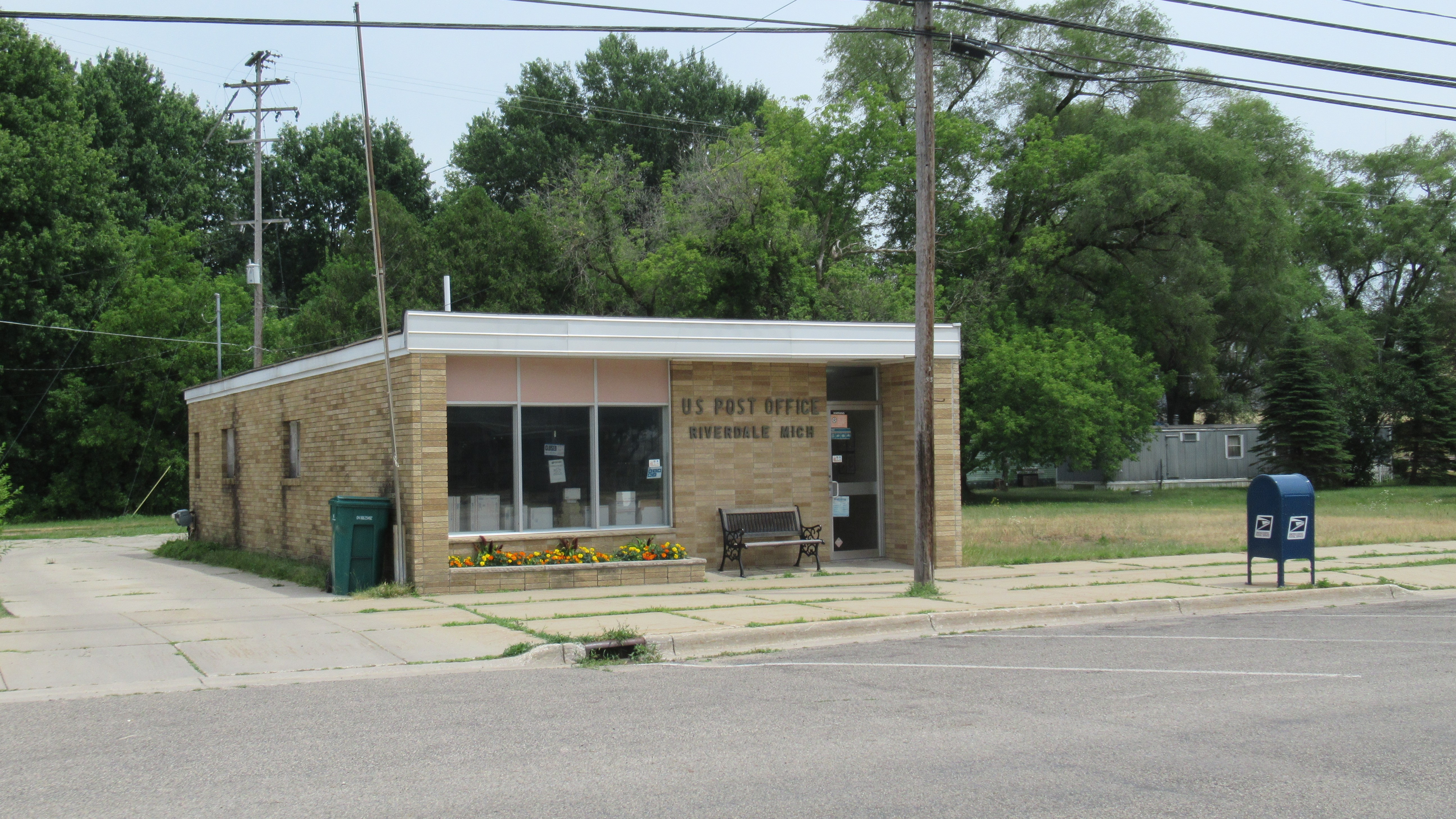
U.S. Post Office in Riverdale

According to the U.S. Census Bureau, the CDP of Riverdale has a total area of 0.70 square miles (1.81 km^{2}), of which 0.69 square miles (1.79 km^{2}) is land and 0.01 square miles (0.03 km^{2}) (1.43%) is water.

Riverdale is centrally located in the state's Lower Peninsula about 16 miles (26 km) south of the city of Mount Pleasant. The community is centered along North Lumberjack Road about 2.0 miles (3.2 km) south of M-46. The Pine River flows through the community. Other nearby unincorporated communities include Elm Hall just to the south, Vestaburg to the west, and Elwell to the east. The cities of Alma and St. Louis are located further east.

The Riverdale post office uses the 48877 ZIP Code. The post office serves the western portion of Seville Township, as well the northwestern portion of Sumner Township. In Montcalm County, the post office serves the eastern portions of Richland Township and Ferris Township, as well as a small portion of the southeast corner of Fremont Township in Isabella County. The post office is located at 6728 North Lumberjack Road in the center of the community.

The 42-mile-long (68 km) Fred Meijer Heartland Trail, which travels from Alma to Greenville, has a trailhead in Riverdale.

== History ==
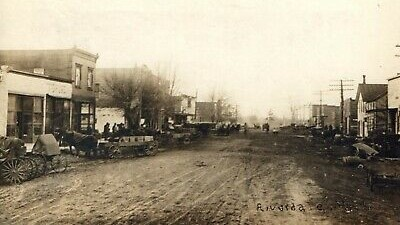
Historic image of Riverdale before 1920

The area was first settled by Arthur Newton in 1874, and he platted the community the following year. The community received a station along the Detroit, Lansing and Northern Railroad, which later became part of the Pere Marquette Railway. Nelson also became the first postmaster when a post office opened on March 10, 1876. He wanted the post office to be named Riverside, as it was located along the Pine River. However, there was already another Riverside post office in operation in Berrien County. His post office and community would instead be named Riverdale. The post office has remained in continuous operation and is located at 6728 North Lumberjack Road in the center of the community.

The railroad was eventually discontinued, and the station and railway lines were removed entirely. In 1994, the former pathway of the railway lines was transformed into the Fred Meijer Heartland Trail, which was completed by 2015.

Among the oldest buildings and remaining businesses in the community is the Riverdale Tavern, which has been in operation since 1917. In 1895, Charles Green opened a saloon and restaurant in Riverdale. In 1912, he also added a grocery store and ice cream parlor to his business, but it burned down in 1917. On the same concrete slab of his former business, he rebuilt and established the Riverdale Tavern that same year. During the Prohibition Era, the building again transformed back to a grocery store and ice cream parlor. Green died in 1962, and the business transitioned through many owners. In 2017, the Riverdale Tavern celebrated its centennial anniversary.

For the 2020 census, Riverdale was included as a newly-listed census-designated place. Riverdale continues to remain an unincorporated community with no legal autonomy of its own.

== Demographics ==
Historical population
Census	Pop.	Note	%±
2020	281		—
U.S. Decennial Census

== Education ==
The community of Riverdale is served by Alma Public Schools to the east in the city of Alma. The Seville Township Library is located in the center of the community at 6734 North Lumberjack Road right next door to the post office.
