= Mike Corgan =

American football player (1918–1989)

Profile
- Position: Fullback

Personal information
- Born: October 26, 1918; Olongapo, Philippine Islands
- Died: May 28, 1989 (aged 70); Lincoln, Nebraska, U.S.
- Listed height: 5 ft 10 in (1.78 m)
- Listed weight: 188 lb (85 kg)

Career information
- High school: Alma (MI)
- College: Notre Dame

Career history

Playing
- Detroit Lions (1943)

Coaching
- Nebraska (1962–1982) Running backs coach

Awards and highlights
- 2× College football national champion - Nebraska (1970, 1971)

Career statistics
- Games: 4
- Stats at Pro Football Reference

Michael Henry Corgan (October 26, 1918 – May 28, 1989) was an American football player and coach. He played college football at Notre Dame from 1937 to 1939 and professional football for the Detroit Lions in 1943. He coached high school football in Michigan and then worked as an assistant coach at Wyoming and Nebraska (1962-1983).

== Early life ==
Corgan was born in 1918 at Olongapo in the Philippines. He attended Alma High School in Alma, Michigan.

== Notre Dame ==
Corgan played college football at Notre Dame as a halfback from 1937 to 1939. He sustained a broken clavicle in a scrimmage on October 25, 1938, and missed the remainder of the 1938 season.

After graduating from Notre Dame, Corgan in 1940 was hired as a football coach at Roger Williams High School in St. Joseph, Michigan.

== Professional football ==
In 1943, Corgan resumed his playing career, joining the Detroit Lions of the National Football League (NFL). He appeared in four NFL games at fullback, one as a starter.

== Later life ==
In 1944, during World War II, Corgan was commissioned as an ensign in the naval reserve and was assigned to Princeton for training.

After the war, Corgan was a high school football coach in Michigan. He compiled a 90-22-6 record as a high school coach. Corgan later served as an assistant coach under Bob Devaney at Wyoming and, starting in 1962, at Nebraska. At Nebraska, he was the running backs coach from 1962 to 1983. He helped develop running backs Jeff Kinney, Tony Davis, Rick Berns, I. M. Hipp, Tom Rathman, Jarvis Redwine, Roger Craig and Mike Rozier. He was also a professor in Nebraska's vocation and adult education department. He died in 1989 at age 70 at his home in Lincoln, Nebraska.
