= Hamp Airport =

Public use airport serving Elwell, Michigan

- IATA: none; ICAO: none; FAA LID: 68R

Summary
- Owner/Operator: Mike Hamp
- Serves: Elwell, Michigan
- Closed: 1981
- Time zone: UTC−05:00 (-5)
  - Summer (DST): UTC−04:00 (-4)
- Elevation AMSL: 825 ft / 252 m
- Coordinates: 43°23′58″N 084°48′04″W
- Interactive map of Hamp Airport

Runways
Direction	Length		Surface
Direction	ft	m	Surface
9/27	2,580	786	Turf

Statistics (2020)
- Aircraft Movements: 150

The Hamp Airport (FAA LID: 68R) is a privately owned, public-use airport located three miles (4.8 km) west of Elwell, Michigan. The airport covers 12 acres (4.9 ha) of land at an elevation of 825 feet (251 m).

== History ==
The airport is owned by Harold Hamp, a local pilot and mechanic. Hamp and his son have a maintenance shop at the airport to work on a variety of aircraft.

Hamp's first airport was built in 1981. After Hamp made aircraft maintenance his full-time career, he got the airport approved for public use so people could fly their planes in to his maintenance shop. The airport has sense been used for transient aircraft and skydiving operations.

== Facilities and aircraft ==
The airport has one runway, designated as Runway 9/27. It measures 2,580 by 100 feet (786 m × 30 m) and is made of turf. For the 12-month period ending December 31, 2020, the airport has 150 aircraft operations per year, an average of just over 12 per month. These movements consisted entirely of general aviation. For the same time period, 4 aircraft were based at the airport, all single-engine airplanes.

The airport does not have a fixed-base operator, and no fuel is available.

== Accidents and incidents ==
- On June 26, 1993, a Piper PA-24 Comanche crashed after takeoff from Hamp Airport, coming down in a field less than a mile from the airport. The probable cause of the accident was found to be the improper use of the fuel selector by the pilot, resulting in fuel starvation.
- On September 3, 2006, a Luscombe 8A nosed over while landing at Hamp Airport. The aircraft was high on the approach and the pilot entered a slip to lose altitude, but the aircraft touched down more than halfway down the runway. The pilot applied brakes to stop on the runway and the airplane nosed over. The probable cause of the accident was found to be the pilot's excessive braking after he failed to attain the proper touchdown point and failed to perform a go-around.

== See also ==
- List of airports in Michigan
