= Conservation Park Site =

Archaeological site in Michigan, United States

- Conservation Park Site (20GR33)
- U.S. National Register of Historic Places
- Location within Michigan Location within the United States
- Location: Pine River Park, Alma, Michigan
- Coordinates: 43°22′15″N 84°40′15″W
- Area: 1.4 acres (0.57 ha)
- NRHP reference No.: 85002695
- Added to NRHP: September 30, 1985

The Conservation Park Site, also known as the Pine River Park Site and designated 20GR33, is an archaeological site located along the Pine River in Alma, Michigan. The site was discovered by archaeologists from Alma College in 1976, and excavations conducted in 1977-81 and 1983-85 found early Woodland period material. indicating a camp covering 1.4 acres (0.57 ha). The site was listed on the National Register of Historic Places in 1985.
