= Jim Lilly =

American politician

Member of the Michigan House of Representatives from the 89th district
- Incumbent
- Assumed office January 1, 2017
- Preceded by: Amanda Price

Personal details
- Born: September 30, 1981 (age 45) Ypsilanti, Michigan
- Party: Republican
- Spouse: Sarah
- Education: John Carroll University; Stonier Graduate School of Banking
- Website: Vote Jim Kelly

James G. Lilly (born September 30, 1981) is a Republican member of the Michigan House of Representatives.

== Biography ==
Lilly is currently attending Grand Valley State University pursuing a master's degree in Business Administration. He was named Legislator of the Year by Michigan Municipal League in 2019.

Political offices
Preceded by Amanda Price	Michigan Representatives; 89th District; 2017–present	Succeeded by Incumbent
