= Arlan Meekhof =

American politician

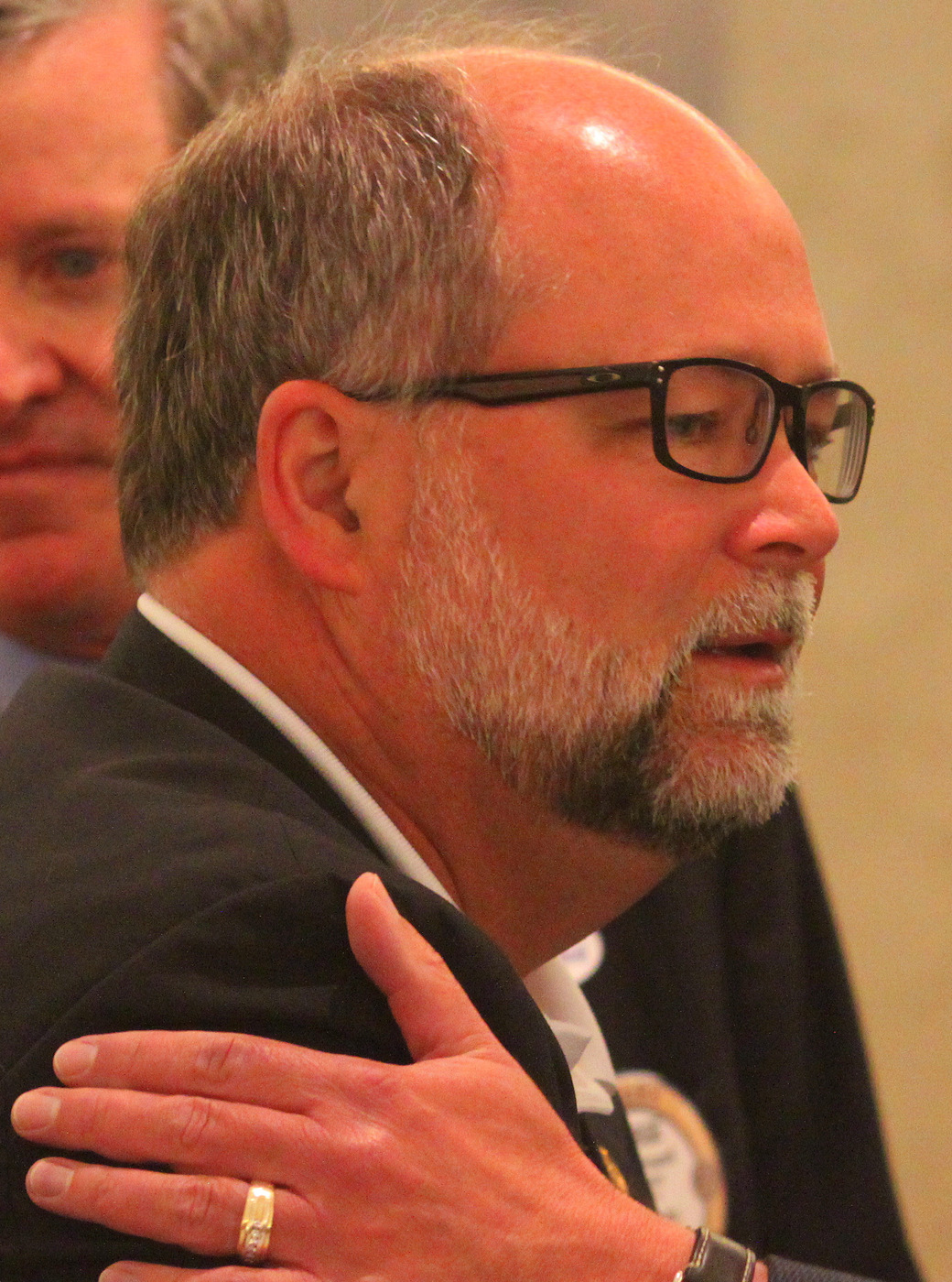

Majority Leader of the Michigan Senate
- In office January 14, 2015 – January 1, 2019
- Preceded by: Randy Richardville
- Succeeded by: Mike Shirkey

Majority Floor Leader of the Michigan Senate
- In office January 11, 2011 – January 1, 2015
- Preceded by: Alan Cropsey
- Succeeded by: Mike Kowall

Member of the Michigan Senate from the 30th district
- In office January 1, 2011 – January 1, 2019
- Preceded by: Wayne Kuipers
- Succeeded by: Roger Victory

Member of the Michigan House of Representatives from the 89th district
- In office January 1, 2007 – January 1, 2011
- Preceded by: Barbara Vander Veen
- Succeeded by: Amanda Price

Personal details
- Born: November 28, 1959 (age 66) Grand Haven, Michigan, U.S.
- Party: Republican
- Spouse: Barb
- Children: 3
- Education: Davenport University
- Website: State Senate website (archived)

Arlan B. Meekhof (born November 28, 1959) is an American Republican politician from Michigan formerly serving in the Michigan Senate and as that chamber's majority leader. He previously served two terms in the Michigan House of Representatives.

Arlan Meekhof has been a figure of controversy with the support of tax increases through the May 2015 Michigan proposal 1 tax increase as well as the October 2015 vote for fuel and registration tax/fee increase set to go in place January 2017. He has also led the fight for the purchase of a new senate building.

He endorsed Ohio governor John Kasich for president on September 19, 2015.

== See also ==
- List of Michigan state legislatures

Michigan Senate
Preceded by Randy Richardville	Majority Leader of the Michigan Senate; 2015–2019	Succeeded by Mike Shirkey
