= MacLachlan Sanitarium =

- Dr. Charles H. MacLachlan Sanitarium and House
- U.S. National Register of Historic Places
- Michigan State Historic Site
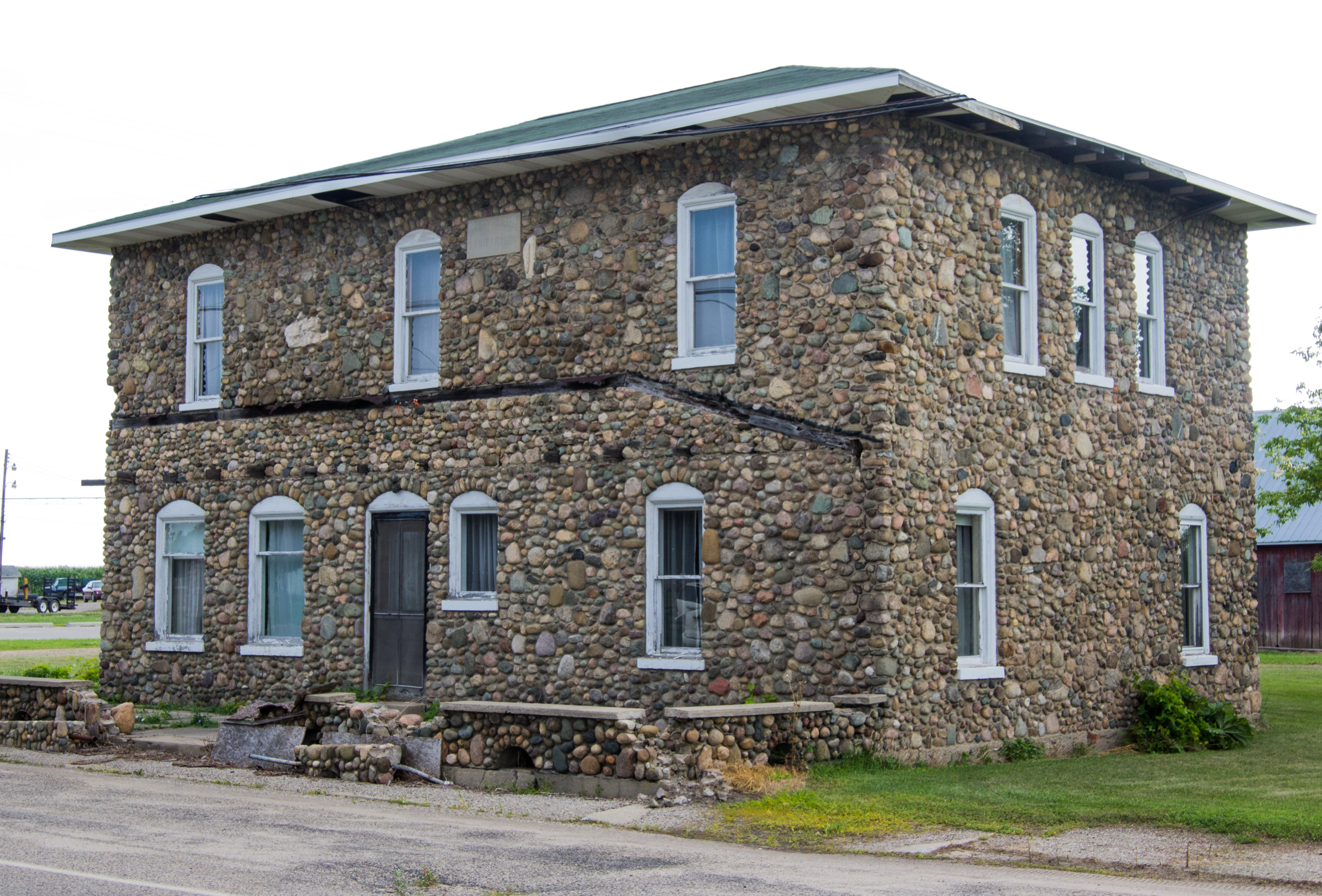

- Location within Michigan Location within the United States
- Interactive map
- Location: 6482 Pingree Rd., Elwell, Michigan
- Coordinates: 43°23′9″N 84°44′47″W
- Area: less than one acre
- Built: 1908
- NRHP reference No.: 82000533

Significant dates
- Added to NRHP: November 22, 1982
- Designated MSHS: January 8, 1981

The MacLachlan Sanitarium is a hospital/family home located at 6482 Pingree Road in Elwell, Michigan. It was designated a Michigan State Historic Site in 1981 and listed on the National Register of Historic Places in 1982.

== History ==
Dr. Charles H. MacLachlan was born in 1845 in Perth County, Ontario, the son of Alexander and Clamina MacLachlan. He later moved to Pennsylvania, and there married Sarah E. Peters in 1871. Maclachlan was an early proponent of "physiological therapeutics," a treatment of chronic diseases without the use of medication. He studied at Juttners Physiological Institute in Cincinnati, then moved to Seville Township in 1883. There, he constructed a sanitarium as a facility to treat chronic diseases such as tuberculosis, rheumatism, and nerve and skin disease. The facility also served as a local hospital. MacLachlan slowly built the establishment into a thriving medical practice, and in 1908 added a main section to the facility.

The structure was used as a sanitarium until MacLachlan's death in 1920. Afterward, it was used as a boardinghouse, bar, restaurant, dancehall, and private residence.

== Description ==
The Charles H. MacLachlan Sanitarium consists of two attached sections: a small single-story wood-framed structure built in 1883 and a larger two-story fieldstone structure built in 1908. The 1883 section is clad with clapboards and sits on a stone pad; it has a gable roof and double hung sashwindows. The 1908 section is constructed of uncoursed fieldstone, sitting on a stone pad and topped with a hip roof. A deep veranda spans the front of the building and wraps around one corner. The veranda has support columns and a balustrade constructed of fieldstone. The windows of the structure are surrounded with slightly arced stone frames.
