= Brown Site =

Archaeological site in Michigan, United States

- Brown Site (20GR21)
- U.S. National Register of Historic Places
- Location within Michigan Location within the United States
- Nearest city: Alma, Michigan
- Coordinates: 43°20′30″N 84°42′0″W
- Area: 0.8 acres (0.32 ha)
- NRHP reference No.: 85002411
- Added to NRHP: September 19, 1985

The Brown Site, designated 20GR21, is an archaeological site located along the Pine River near Tyler Road, south of Alma College. It is situated on a sandy point near a small creek. The site was discovered in 1976 as part of a survey of the Pine River watershed by researchers from Alma College, and excavations were conducted in 1977 and 1979. It is the site of a late Woodland period village dating to about AD 1000, covering 0.8 acres (0.32 ha).

The Brown Site and was listed on the National Register of Historic Places in 1985.
