= Amanda Price =

American politician

Member of the Michigan House of Representatives from the 89th district
- In office January 1, 2011 – 2016
- Preceded by: Arlan Meekhof
- Succeeded by: Jim Lilly

Personal details
- Born: October 30, 1956 (age 69) Lansing, Michigan
- Party: Republican
- Spouse: Rodger
- Education: Michigan State University; Western Michigan University
- Website: State Rep. Amanda Price

Amanda Price is a Republican politician from Michigan who previously served in the Michigan House of Representatives.

Prior to her election to the legislature, Price was a township trustee and supervisor. She is a former legislative aide, and was the public affairs manager for SemcoEnergy.
