= Holiday Park Site =

Archaeological site in Michigan, United States

- Holiday Park Site (20GR91)
- U.S. National Register of Historic Places
- Location within Michigan Location within the United States
- Location: Holiday Park, Alma, Michigan
- Coordinates: 43°22′15″N 84°40′0″W
- Area: 0.5 acres (0.20 ha)
- NRHP reference No.: 85003519
- Added to NRHP: December 6, 1985

The Holiday Park Site, designated 20GR91, is an archaeological site located in Alma, Michigan. The site is a few hundred meters south of the Pine River, and was the location of a Late Woodland period village covering approximately 0.5 acres (0.20 ha).

The Holiday Park Site was listed on the National Register of Historic Places in 1985.
