= Alma High School (Michigan) =

Location
- 1500 Pine Avenue; Alma, Michigan 48801; United States
- Coordinates: 43.3913°N 84.6553°W

Information
- Other name: AHS
- Type: Public high school
- School district: Alma Public Schools
- NCES School ID: 260264003980
- Principal: Dan Falor
- Teaching staff: 35.30 (on an FTE basis)
- Grades: 9–12
- Enrollment: 549 (2023-2024)
- Student to teacher ratio: 15.55
- Colors: Orange and black
- Nickname: Panthers
- Website: www.almaschools.net/o/ahs

Alma High School (AHS) is a public high school in Alma, Michigan, United States. It is part of the Alma Public Schools district.
