= Salvo Post Office =

Historic building in North Carolina, US

- U.S. National Register of Historic Places
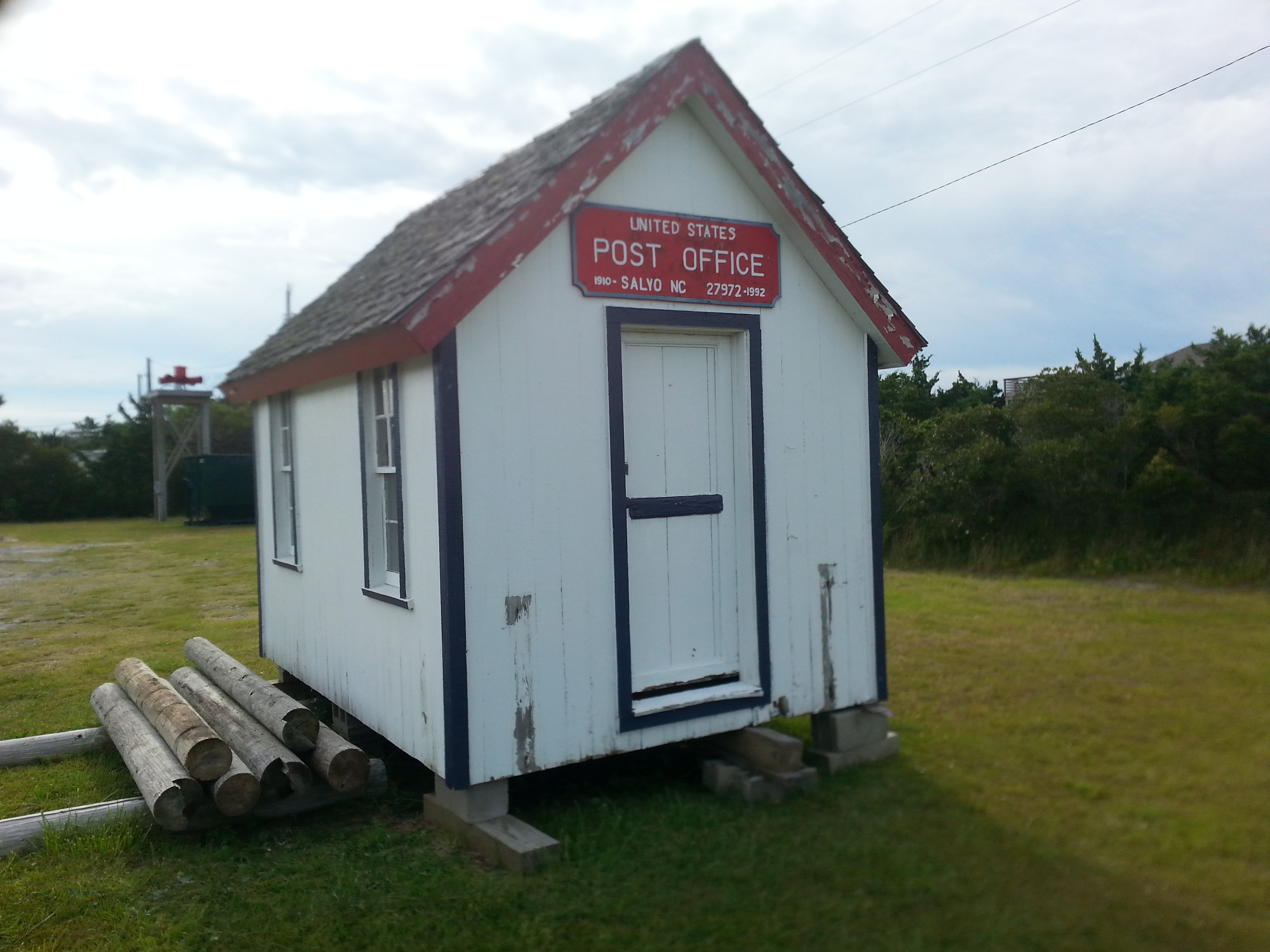
- Salvo Post Office, September 2013

- Location within North Carolina Location within the United States
- Location: NC 12, west side, 0.1 mi. S of jct. with Park Rd., Salvo, North Carolina
- Coordinates: 35°32′24″N 75°28′27″W
- Area: less than one acre
- Built: c. 1910
- Built by: Lafayette Douglas
- NRHP reference No.: 93000997
- Added to NRHP: September 23, 1993

The Salvo Post Office is a historic post office building located at Salvo, in Dare County, North Carolina, on the Outer Banks. It was built about 1910, and is a small frame building measuring 8 feet by 12 feet (about 2.4 by 3.6 meters). The interior consists of the post office lobby and the postmaster's workroom. It reflects a unique tradition of a portable building being purchased by succeeding postmasters and moved to their respective properties. It is recognized by the U.S. Postal Service as the second-smallest post office building in the nation, after the Ochopee Post Office in Florida. The building was restored after being damaged by fire in October 1992.

It was listed on the National Register of Historic Places in 1993.

== History and description ==
The first post office in Salvo, North Carolina, was established in 1901. However, the post office was not in a building dedicated specifically for that purpose, instead being inside a shed on the front porch of the first postmaster, Kenneth R. Pugh. After Marcie Douglas became postmaster, the first woman to serve in that role in Salvo, her husband, Lafeyette Douglas, constructed the community's first standalone post office around 1910.

Although initially involving a slow workload, usage of the post office began increasing in the 1930s. Two postmasters, Melvina Whedbee and Edward Augustus Hooper, moved the building to their properties in 1953 and 1979, respectively. After Hooper did so, he added electrical wiring. About a year later, Hooper installed 94 post boxes, allowing for mail to be picked up for the first time if the postmaster was not present. By the 1970s, a dispute arose as to whether this structure or the Ochopee Post Office in Florida is the smallest post office in the United States. At the time, a wire service photo described the post office in Salvo as "one of, if not the smallest in the U.S. postal system." In 1988, the Ochopee Post office was declared the smallest in the country and its Salvo counterpart as the second-smallest. An arsonist set the post office and an adjacent store ablaze in October 1992. Although the former suffered significant damage, it was able to be restored by May 1993, largely by volunteers under supervision from an architect, the postmaster, and the State Historic Preservation Office.

The building, currently located on the west side of North Carolina Highway 12 about 0.1 miles (0.16 km) of south the intersection with Park Road, has not been used as a post office since the fire in 1992 and has become a local attraction. On September 23, 1993, the Salvo Post Office was listed on the National Register of Historic Places. Standing on top of 2 feet (0.61 m) pilings, the post office is a small wood frame structure, approximately 8 by 12 feet (2.4 by 3.7 m). The interior consists of the post office lobby and the postmaster's workroom, while the exterior is wood-sheathed and also has four 4 by 4 feet (1.2 by 1.2 m) sash windows. The roof is gable-style and covered with wooden shingles.
