= Alma Downtown Historic District (Alma, Michigan) =

Historic district in Michigan, United States

- U.S. National Register of Historic Places
- U.S. Historic district
- Michigan State Historic Site
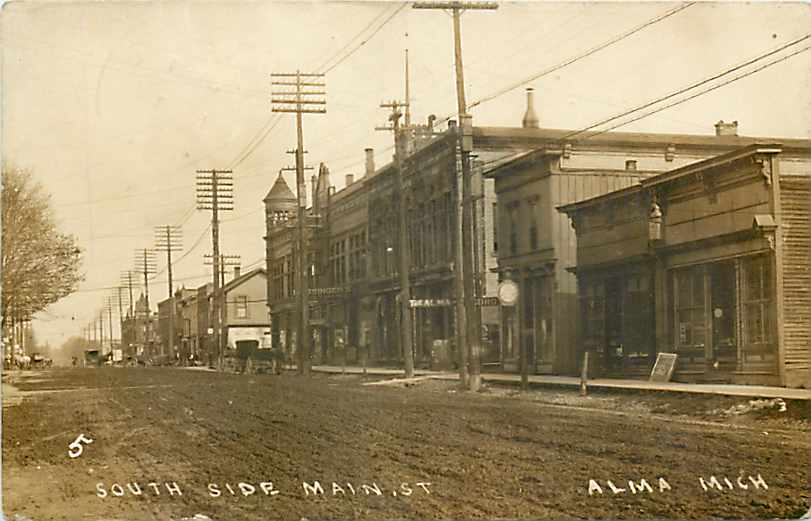
- South side Superior St near State c 1913

- Location within Michigan Location within the United States
- Interactive map
- Location: Superior and State Streets in Alma, Michigan
- Coordinates: 43°22′44″N 84°39′43″W
- Architectural style: Commercial brick, Italianate, Queen Anne, Neoclassical Revival, Art Moderne, International Style, Richardsonian Romanesque
- NRHP reference No.: 13000904

Significant dates
- Added to NRHP: December 11, 2013
- Designated MSHS: November 21, 1975

The Alma Downtown Historic District is a commercial historic district in Alma, Michigan, roughly located along Superior Street between the Pine River and Prospect Avenue, and along State Street between Center and Downie Streets. Parts of the district were designated a Michigan State Historic Site in 1975, and the entirety was listed on the National Register of Historic Places in 2013. It contains 72 structures, primarily brick commercial buildings, ranging from one to three stories in height and dating from 1874 (and likely earlier) to the 1960s.

== History ==
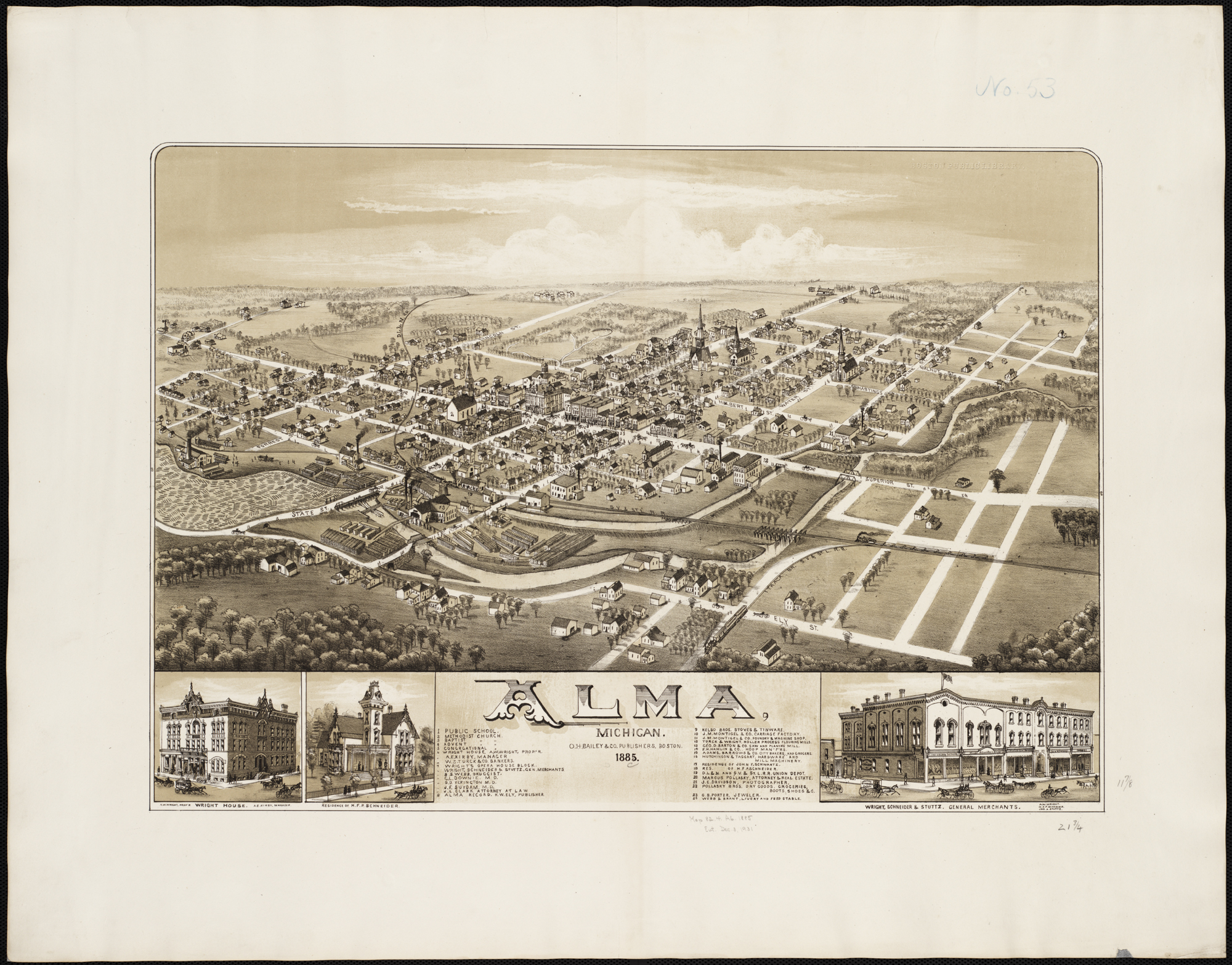
1885 map with Alma Downtown Historic District at center

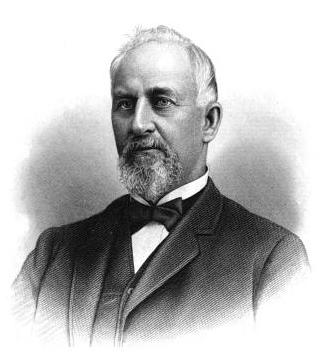
Ammi Williard Wright

In 1853/54, General Ralph Ely purchased land along the Pine River and settled there with his wife and children. He erected a mill and a settlement, "Elyton," sprang up in the area. In 1858, James Gargett platted a larger nearby area and dubbed it "Alma." Both Alma and Elyton increased in size, and were soon combined under the name of Alma. Alma had seventy residents by 1860, which increased to 404 in 1870, 467 in 1880, and 1,665 in 1890.

Alma grew rapidly in the latter part of the 19th century in large part due to the local lumber industry, but also due to the agricultural prosperity of the region. The first commercial building in Alma was constructed in the late 1850s by General Ely; by 1884 the Alma commercial district encompassed the heart of what is now the Alma Downtown Historic District: Superior Street from just east of Woodworth to a point west of State Street, and another half-block both north and south along State. All but three of these buildings were wooden; the very first brick commercial building in Alma was built in 1875, the second was the grand 1880 Wright Opera House Block, and the third was the nearby 1883 Wright Hotel (now demolished).

These last two buildings were constructed by Ammi Williard Wright, a lumberman who adopted Alma as his base of operations. Wright has a large influence on the development of the district, not only because he was directly responsible for some of the most important structures in the district (in addition to the Opera House, Wright built the First State Bank Building, the original Masonic Home/Sanitarium, and his personal residence), but also because he established some of the largest businesses and industries in Alma in the late 19th and early 20th century. These included constructed the Alma Roller Mills in 1881, the Wright House hotel in 1883, the First State Bank of Alma in 1883, the Alma Springs Sanitarium in 1885, the Alma Sugar Company plant in 1899, the Alma Manufacturing Company gasoline engine plant in 1903, and the Central Michigan Produce Company in 1905.

Due in large part to the growth of the city, more buildings were constructed in the district in the 1890s, most of which were brick and stone. By 1902, the two-block heart of the district along Superior between State and Gratiot was nearly all filled in with masonry structures.

Alma grew rapidly at the beginning of the 20th century, with a population of 2,757 in 1910 and 7,542 in 1920. The boom was in large part due to the increase in the industrial base, with agricultural firms such as the Central Michigan Produce Company, the Alma Sugar Company, and the Libby, McNeill, and Libby pickle canning plant opening. In addition, the founding of the Republic Motor Truck Company in 1913, and its subsequent expansion to support World War I production, drove the increase in Alma's fortunes. The commercial district followed suit, extending its boundaries both east and west along Superior, as well as south along State, as more structures were built.

However, after the war, production of trucks and Republic's sales decreased dramatically, and as the company's prospects fizzled, Alma's population plateaued. Further growth did not occur until after World War II, when more manufacturing moved into the area. The commercial district saw some additional construction, although the size of the district remained substantially as it was in 1920. More significantly, there were substantial facade modernizations during the 1960s throughout the district.

== Description ==
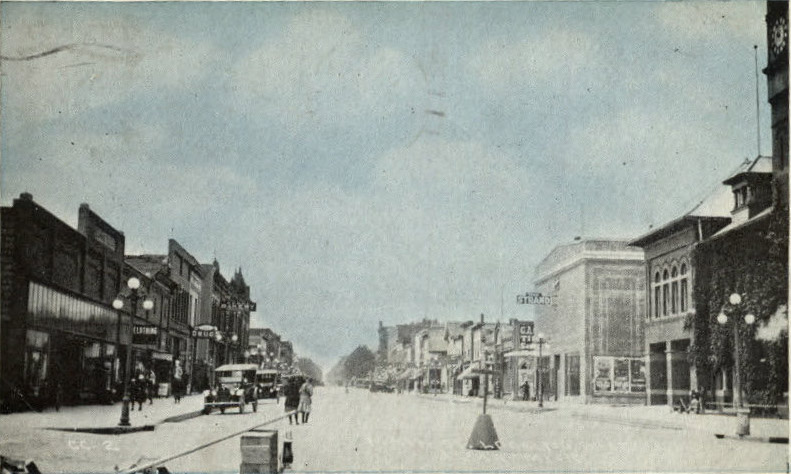
Superior St at Gratiot looking west, c. 1910

The Alma Downtown Historic District covers some portion of eleven city blocks along Superior and State Streets. It contains 72 structures ranging from one to three stories in height. Architectural styles range from Italianate, Queen Anne, and Neoclassical Revval to Art Moderne and International Style. The buildings in the district are primarily commercial buildings, but also included are the massive stone A. W. Wright House, as well as the 1915 hospital building, the Alma Public Building/City Hall, and the Post Office Building.

The buildings along Superior Street are nearly all brick, although some very early frame structures are also included. Most of the area has little or no space between buildings, and the first floor commercial spaces open directly onto the sidewalk. As one moves north or south along the cross streets, the building scale generally decrease and the space between buildings increases.

The following are some of the more significant buildings in the district, in order of construction:

=== Alma Interiors (201 E. Superior) ===
The Alma Interiors building is a two-story frame building constructed at some time before 1884; there are still simple Greek Revival elements visible that suggest that this building may be the oldest building in downtown Alma. The building housed a hardware and tin shop in the late nineteenth century, and a millinery, dress shop, and grocer at later dates.

=== Delavan Building (115 E. Superior) ===
The Delavan Building, constructed in 1874, was the first brick building in Alma. It was constructed by Henry Delavan to house his general store. Delavan and his sons ran the general store in this building from the time of construction until 1914 when they sold it to W.S. Proud. Proud ran the store until the 1920s, after which it briefly housed Gay's Variety Store. In 1929, George Maier moved his clothing store into the building, and operated it until the mid-1960s when he died. The building was vacant for some time, and then was purchased by Bill Brown for his shoe store. As of 2013, the building is still occupied by a shoe store.

The Delavan Building is two-story brick commercial building, now clad on the second story with vinyl siding. The storefront has large windows and a central recessed entry. The building originally had round-arch second-story windows.

=== Wright Opera House Block (101–107 E. Superior) ===
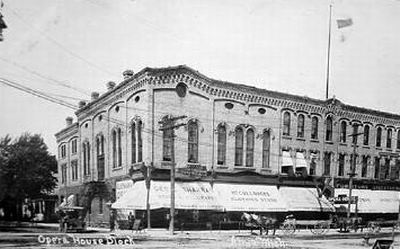
Wright Opera House Block

The Wright Opera House Block was built in 1879–1880 by lumberman and banker Ammi Williard Wright. Wright had originally planned to construct a smaller building to house his general store, which had burned in 1876. However, after a few years of delays, and changing business partners, Wright built this impressive structure, which housed five commercial bays on the ground floor, and an opera house, initially called "Barton's Hall," which occupied the two upper floors of the building.

The Opera House Block is a three-story Italianate commercial building constructed of cream-colored brick. It covers a footprint of 110 feet (34 m) by 85 feet (26 m). The upper-story windows in the opera house section were originally tall one-over-one double-hung wooden windows, set into arched hoods with a prominent keystone and filling much of the two-story height. The windows in the upper stories in the remainder of the block were similar, but shorter and with less detail. The Opera House housed a series of commercial establishments throughout the 20th and into the 21st century. However, in 2010 a fire extensively damaged the building. Rehabilitation of the entire complex for mixed residential and commercial use began in 2012, with commercial space on the ground floor and residential units for Alma College students on the upper floors. The Opera House was listed independently on the National Register of Historic Places in 2013.

=== Church Block (202–214 E. Superior) ===
The Church Block was constructed in 1886 for General Nathan Church of Ithaca. It was the fourth commercial brick structure built in Alma. Church hired George S. Young to construct the building. The Church Block is a two-story Late Victorian brick commercial block; it contains six street-level storefronts. The two center storefronts define a midsection which rises slightly above the flanking bays; on the second floor a broad and tall round-arch window is centered in the building and flanked by two square-head double window. The four bays flanking its center section also have square-head double windows on the second floor. All the storefronts have recessed central entries; the three eastern stores still have most of the external finishes, including square cast iron columns. Two of the stores still have the original ornate transoms.

=== Ammi W. Wright House (503 N. State) ===
Ammi W. Wright House
- Interactive map of Ammi W. Wright House
- Location: 503 North State Street, Alma, Michigan

History
- Built: 1886

Site notes
- Governing body: Private

Michigan State Historic Site
- Designated: July 29, 1980

This house, designed by Spier and Rohns of Detroit, was built in 1886-87 by G.S. Young as Ammi W. Wright's personal residence. The house incorporated what were at the time novel innovations in home construction, including hot water heat, electric wiring, and indoor hot and cold running water. Wright lived in this house until his death in 1912; his wife and sister-in-law continued to live there until their deaths in 1925 ind 1931. In 1934, the widow of Doctor R. B. Smith purchased the house and converted it into a hospital, which was used until 1956. It later was used by the Northwood Institute and the Northwood Center for Research and Development, and was designated a Michigan State Historic Site in 1980.

The Wright House is a massive 2-1/2 story brownish-gray sandstone Richardsonian Romanesque structure with a tiled gable and hip roof. It is rectangular, measuring 67 feet (20 m) by 36 feet (11 m), and sits on a stone foundation. Gables, bays, and porches decorated with balustrades, columns, and stone carving project from the exterior. The entry is through a corner porch with a flat roof and four heavy arches. A two-story gabled bay is immediately adjacent to the entry porch, and a second semi-round porch with heavy columns and a flat roof is located in the opposite corner. A timber porte cochere was once located near the front entry porch.

=== Pollasky Block (101-109 W. Superior) ===
Michael Pollasky had a wooden store at this location; it burned down in 1893. Between 1897 and 1902, Pollasky had George S. Young construct this brick building, using a design from Saginaw architects Haug and Schuermann. It is a two-story brick building trimmed with sandstone, and contains five storefronts at the street level, separated into bays by vertical brick piers. A sixth, narrower bay contains an entrance to the stairway. A semi-round turret sits on the corner of the building; it is lacking its original upper story and conical roof. However, the remainder of the second floor retains a high degree of integrity, containing the original double-hung windows with limestone sills and lintels, as well as pressed metalwork with wreaths and garlands near the roofline.

=== Alma Public Building (225 E. Superior) ===
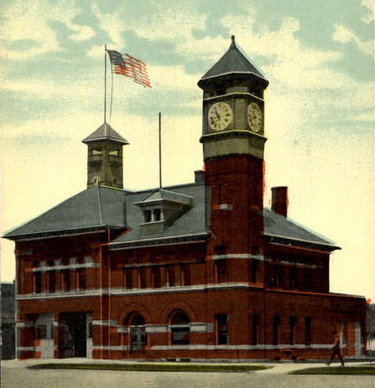
Alma City Hall

The Alma Public Building (also known as the Alma City Hall) was constructed in 1902 using a design from Saginaw architects Haug and Schuermann. It originally housed all of Alma's public offices, including the fire house, village hall, and various offices. Several additions were made to the building, including a new firehouse in 1918, and a single-story extension to the west some time after 1924. The city used the building until 1975, when a new structure was built. The old Public Building remained vacant until 1980, when a law clinic moved in.

The Alma Public Building is a two-story red brick Richardsonian Romanesque structure with a hip roof and a prominent clock tower at the northwest corner. The original building has a rectangular plan, but later additions have given it a T shape. The front is divided into three sections: the clocktower, the main village hall, and the fire hall. Limestone beltcourses at the level of the second story window sills and lintels unites the sections.

=== Odd Fellows (I.O.O.F.) Hall (313-315 N. State) ===
The Odd Fellows Hall was constructed in 1904 by Alma contractor George S. Young. An addition was constructed in 1917. The Odd Fellows used the building as their headquarters until 1997. The building also housed the Alma Record and the Central Michigan Power and Light offices (later Consumers Power Company) until 1955. The building is a two-story red brick structure separated into three storefronts demarcated by brick piers. The street level storefronts have been rebuilt, and many of the upper story windows have been filled in.

=== First Savings Bank Building (110 W. Superior) ===
The predecessor to the First State Bank was founded as a private bank in 1880. In 1883 Ammi Wright became a partner in the bank, and in 1901 it was incorporated as the First State Bank, with Wright as President. The bank was originally housed in the Opera House Block, but in 1915 construction began on this building, and the bank moved the next year. In 1956 the bank consolidated with Alma State Savings Bank and moved to another building; this building was later used by the Delta Beauty College and the Gratiot Area Chamber of Commerce. The building is a two-story Neoclassical structure with a symmetrical three-bay facade and a recessed central entry flanked by two-story Tuscan columns.

=== Masonic Home Hospital Wing (525 N. State) ===
In 1910, a fire destroyed the State Masonic Lodge Old Folks Home in Grand Rapids. At around the same time, the former Alma Sanitarium became vacant as the fad for mineral baths wound down. Ammi Wright, the sanitarium's owner, offered the building to the Masonic Lodge for $60,000. The Masons were slow to accept, and faced with maintenance costs of his huge building, Wright dropped the asking price to one dollar in 1911. The Masons accepted, and on March 29, 1912 the building was rededicated the Masonic Home. In 1915, the Masons added a large hospital wing to the complex. Eventually, the Masons felt the need for a new campus, and in the 1930s a new complex north of Alma was constructed, and the Sanitarium building was demolished. The 1915 wing operated as a hospital until the mid-1950s. As of 2013, it houses a variety of nonprofit organizations.

The Masonic Home Hospital Wing is a 2-1/2 story Neoclassical structure built of red-brown brick and trimmed with limestone. It is a rectangular building sitting on a raised basement, with a smooth limestone beltcourse separating the rusticated brick basement from the upper floors. Two-story brick piers with limestone capitals run up the walls, above which is a brick frieze and a massive dentilated cornice. The windows are one-over-ones sitting on limestone sills. The building originally had a projecting portico with four limestone Ionic columns spanning the entire front; at some point in the mid-20th century the portico was enclosed in brick, and a small two-story red brick extension was constructed.

=== United States Post Office (233 N. State) ===
The Post Office was constructed in 1937-38, part of the Federal relief programs in the Great Depression. It was built from a standard design originating in the office of Louis A. Simon, Supervising Architect of the Treasury, and was constructed by the James I. Barnes Construction Company of Mount Pleasant, Michigan. It is a single-story brick building with limestone trim and a central stone staircase.

=== Masonic Temple / Central National Bank Building (301 N. State) ===
The Masonic Temple was built in 1963 to house the Central National Bank of Alma on the first floor and the Masonic Temple on the second. It is a large square plan brick International Style building with a deeply recessed corner entryway. It is sited on a corner, and whitish brick piers separate both street facades into bays.
