= Sumner Township, Michigan =

- Civil township
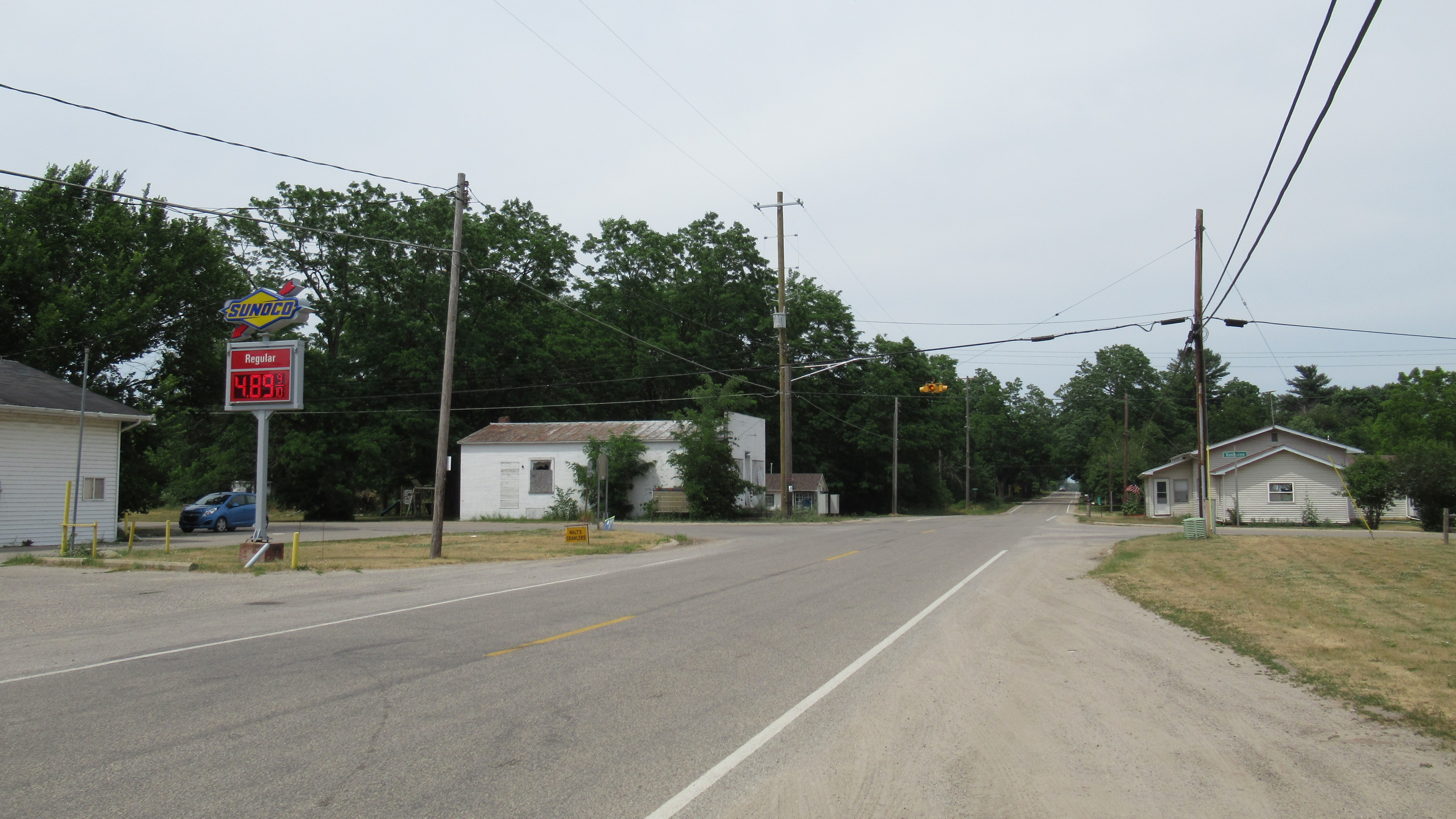
- The unincorporated community of Elm Hall

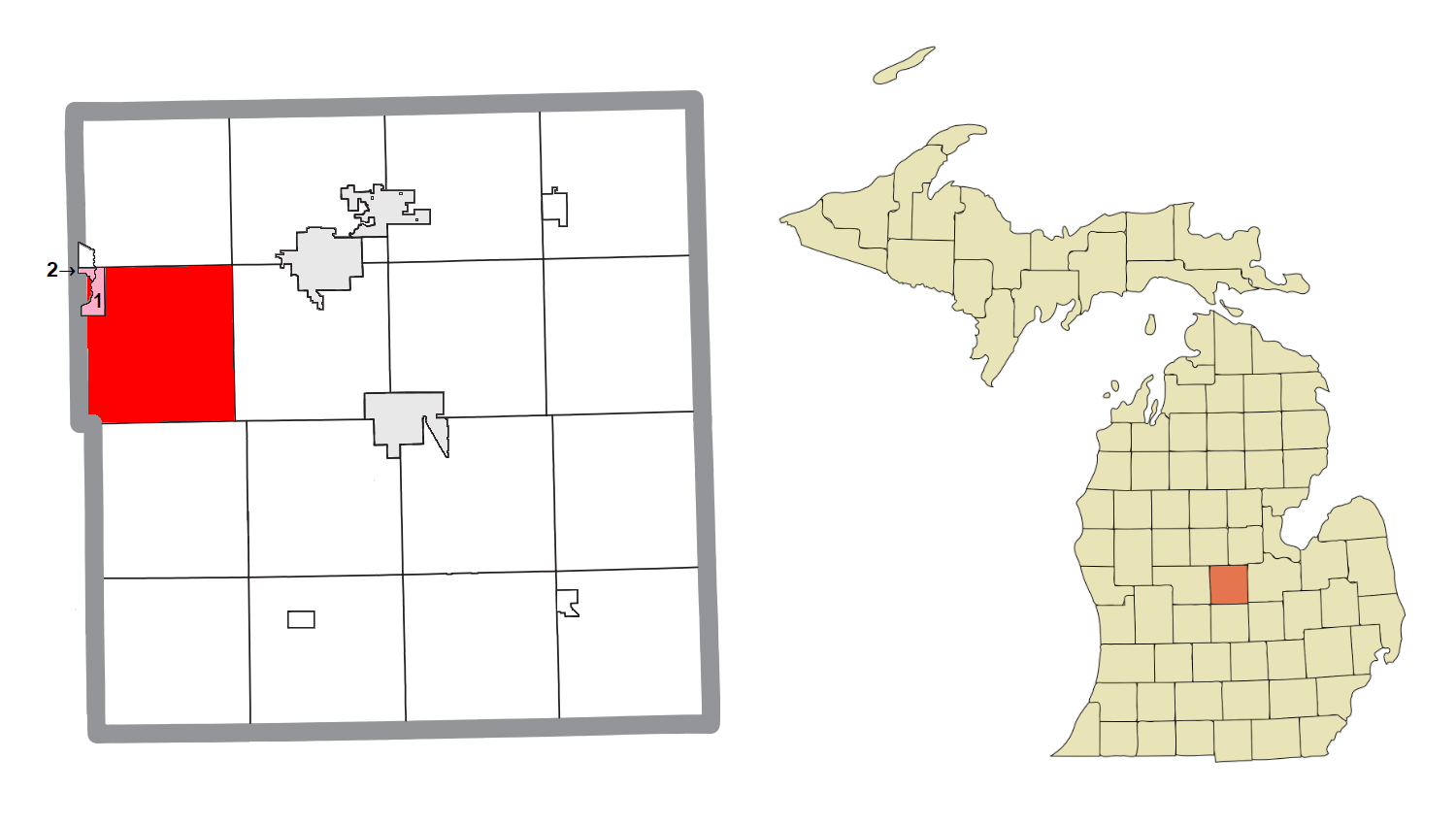
- Location within Gratiot County and administered CDPs of Elm Hall (1) and portion of Riverdale (2)

- Location within the state of Michigan Location within the United States
- Coordinates: 43°19′42″N 84°47′44″W
- Country: United States
- State: Michigan
- County: Gratiot

Area
  - Total: 35.9 sq mi (93.1 km^{2})
  - Land: 35.9 sq mi (93.0 km^{2})
  - Water: 0.039 sq mi (0.1 km^{2})
- Elevation: 778 ft (237 m)

Population (2020)
  - Total: 1,863
  - Density: 51.9/sq mi (20.0/km^{2})
- Time zone: UTC-5 (Eastern (EST))
  - Summer (DST): UTC-4 (EDT)
- ZIP code(s): 48801 (Alma); 48830 (Elm Hall); 48832 (Elwell); 48877 (Riverdale); 48889 (Sumner)
- Area code: 989
- FIPS code: 26-77300
- GNIS feature ID: 1627137
- Website: https://www.sumnertownship.com/

Sumner Township is a civil township of Gratiot County, Michigan, United States. The population was 1,863 at the 2020 census.

== Communities ==
- Elm Hall is an unincorporated community and census-designated place within the township on the Pine River at 43°21′54″N 84°50′07″W. The FIPS place code is 25580.
- Riverdale is an unincorporated community and census-designated place in the township on the Pine River at 43°23′08″N 84°50′08″W. The FIPS place code is 68720.
- Sumner is an unincorporated community within the township on the Pine River at 43°18′25″N 84°48′57″W. The FIPS place code is 77280 and the elevation is 764 feet above sea level.

== Geography ==
According to the United States Census Bureau, the township has a total area of 35.9 square miles (93.1 km^{2}), of which 35.9 square miles (93.0 km^{2}) is land and 0.04 square mile (0.1 km^{2}) (0.11%) is water.

== Demographics ==
As of the census of 2000, there were 1,911 people, 698 households, and 552 families residing in the township. The population density was 53.2 inhabitants per square mile (20.5/km^{2}). There were 744 housing units at an average density of 20.7 per square mile (8.0/km^{2}). The racial makeup of the township was 97.59% White, 0.16% African American, 0.52% Native American, 0.05% Asian, 0.42% from other races, and 1.26% from two or more races. Hispanic or Latino of any race were 2.51% of the population.

There were 698 households, out of which 36.0% had children under the age of 18 living with them, 63.9% were married couples living together, 10.6% had a female householder with no husband present, and 20.8% were non-families. 15.0% of all households were made up of individuals, and 7.2% had someone living alone who was 65 years of age or older. The average household size was 2.72 and the average family size was 2.98.

In the township the population was spread out, with 26.8% under the age of 18, 9.4% from 18 to 24, 28.2% from 25 to 44, 23.7% from 45 to 64, and 11.9% who were 65 years of age or older. The median age was 36 years. For every 100 females, there were 99.9 males. For every 100 females age 18 and over, there were 98.6 males.

The median income for a household in the township was $38,309, and the median income for a family was $42,216. Males had a median income of $30,833 versus $21,296 for females. The per capita income for the township was $16,034. About 7.6% of families and 9.6% of the population were below the poverty line, including 8.1% of those under age 18 and 7.6% of those age 65 or over.
