= Ochopee Post Office =

Post office building in Florida, United States

- Ochopee Post Office (2006)
- Interactive map of Ochopee Post Office
- 25°54′05″N 81°17′50″W
- Location: Ochopee, Florida

Site notes
- Elevation: 3 ft (0.91 m)

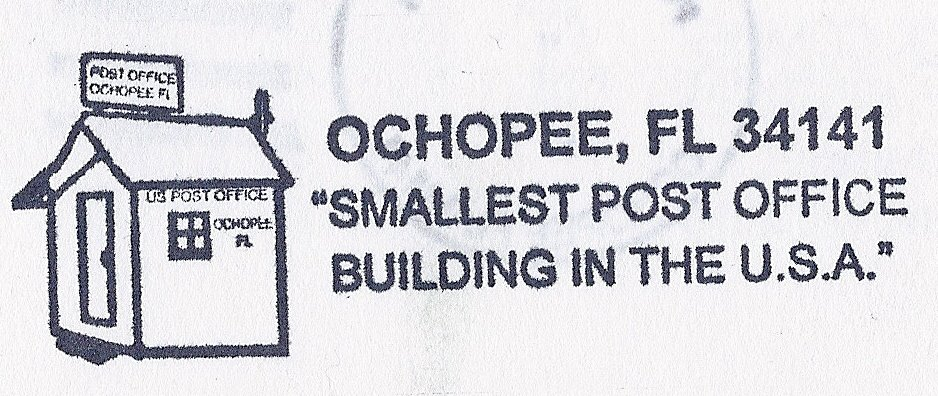
Ochopee postmark

The Ochopee Post Office is the smallest operating post office in the United States. Measuring a mere 61 square feet (5.7 m^{2}), it is a tiny shed on U.S. Route 41 in Collier County near Ochopee, Florida. It is located about 3 miles (5 km) east of the intersection of US 41 and State Road 29. Its ZIP code is 34141 in Area Code 239, Exchange 695.

The building used to be a storage facility for irrigation pipes of an adjacent tomato farm. It was converted into a post office in 1953, after a fire destroyed Ochopee's previous post office, located in the Gaunt Company Store. The post office is fully functional, serving a three-county area, including the surrounding populations of Miccosukee and Seminole Native Americans. Tour buses often stop at the site and the postal clerk is asked to cancel letters with Ochopee's postmark.

The Wooten family has owned the property since 1992. Its USPS internal site designation is 1842US.

== See also ==
- List of United States post offices
- Salvo Post Office, the second-smallest post office in the United States
