= Wright Opera House Block =

- Wright Opera House Block Complex
- U.S. National Register of Historic Places
- U.S. Historic district – Contributing property
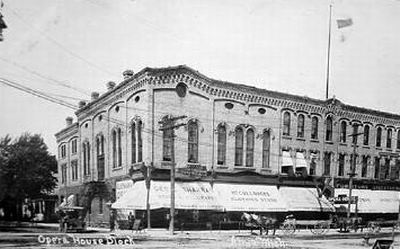
- Opera House c. 1910

- Location within Michigan Location within the United States
- Interactive map
- Location: 101–113 E. Superior St., 408 N. State St., Alma, Michigan
- Coordinates: 43°22′45″N 84°39′41″W
- Built: 1880
- Architectural style: Italianate
- Part of: Alma Downtown Historic District (ID13000904)
- NRHP reference No.: 13000443
- Added to NRHP: June 26, 2013

The Wright Opera House Block, also known as the Alma Opera House Block, is a commercial block located at 101–113 East Superior Street and 408 North State Street in Alma, Michigan. It was listed on the National Register of Historic Places in 2013.

== Ammi Williard Wright ==
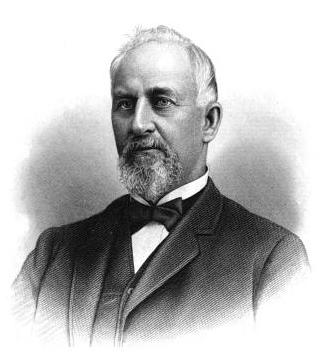
Ammi Williard Wright

Ammi Willard Wright was born in 1822 in Grafton, Vermont. He left home in 1843 to learn business in Boston, then spent several years in the draying business and managing a hotel in Bartonsville, Vermont. In 1848, he married Harriet Barton, the daughter of his employer. The next year the couple moved to Boston, and in 1850 to Detroit. His original business plans were dashed when his business partner died unexpectedly, and Wright then relocated to the Saginaw Valley and got into the lumber business. He was actively engaged in lumbering in the 1850s, then purchased a mill in 1859, and in 1871 formed the First National Bank in Saginaw and the Saginaw Barrel Company. He diversified into other business interestes, including banks, manufacturing, railroads, and timber, mining, and ranching properties.

In 1875, Wright and his partner James Dawson opened a general store in Alma, the first of his properties in the city. It was destroyed by fire the next year, but they relocated temporarily, and purchased a lot on which to construct a new building. Construction was delayed, and soon Wright & Dawson's partnership was dissolved. However, Wright took on new partners, and in 1879 work began on what was then the second brick building in Alma, the Wright Opera House.

In 1879, Harriet Wright began to sicken, and the Wrights moved to Saratoga Springs, New York. Ammi Wright commuted for long periods between Saratoga Springs and Michigan, in particular to the Alma area. Harriet died in 1884; in 1885, Ammi Wright married Anna Case, who had worked as the family seamstress, and moved full-time to Alma. Wright began developing businesses and properties in Alma, starting with a store, and, in 1879-80, the Wright Opera House Block. He also constructed the Alma Roller Mills in 1881, the Wright House hotel in 1883, the First State Bank of Alma in 1883, and the Alma Springs Sanitarium in 1885. Later establishments included the Alma Sugar Company plant in 1899, the Alma Manufacturing Company gasoline engine plant in 1903, and the Central Michigan Produce Company in 1905.

Ammi Willard Wright died in 1912, leaving an estate worth approximately ten million dollars at the time of his death.

== Wright Opera House ==
Wright had originally planned to build a smaller store, but by 1879 plans were expanded to accommodate five stores. The foundation was in place by fall 1879, and the exterior was finished in January of the next year. Businesses were moving into the structure by May 1880, when it was finally completed at the cost of $20,000 (about $670,000 in today's dollars). The first tenants in the building were the Barton & Company general store (Wright's original store, now with a new set of partners), the post office, Coates & Ely Hardware, the Turck, Winton & Co. Bank, and the opera house.

The opera house, initially called "Barton's Hall," occupied the two upper floors of the building. It was used for a number of events in the social life of the town, including dramatic performances, political speeches, and musical performances. It was heavily used for a decade, then fell into disuse, then was remodeled and reopened by Wright's son-in-law, Henry Lancashire, in 1894. It was later remodeled to use as a Masonic Temple.

The entire block was renovated in 1897, and in 1899 an addition known as the Lancashire Building was constructed directly abutting (and connected with) the Opera House.

Both the original Opera House and the Lancashire Building addition housed a series of commercial establishments throughout the 20th and into the 21st century. However, in 2010 a fire extensively damaged the building; as of 2012, only two establishments were using the space: an art gallery in the original Opera House, and a church in the Lancashire Building. Rehabilitation of the entire complex for mixed residential and commercial use began in 2012, with commercial space on the ground floor and residential units for Alma College students on the upper floors. Renovations were completed in August 2019.

== Description ==
The Wright Opera House Block Complex consists of three interconnected buildings: the 1880 Wright Opera House Block, the 1899 Lancashire Building addition, and an associated boiler house/store building.

The Opera House Block is a three-story Italianate commercial building constructed of cream-colored brick. It covers a footprint of 110 feet (34 m) (along Superior Street) by 85 feet (26 m) (along State Street). The facade is five bays wide; the bays are separated by vertical piers, and each bay is topped with a cornice. The upper-story windows in the opera house section were originally tall one-over-one double-hung wooden windows, set into arched hoods with a prominent keystone and filling much of the two-story height. The windows in the upper stories in the remainder of the block were similar, but shorter and with less detail. There are two stairways to the upper floors: one near the center of the Superior Street facade, and one at the back end of the State Street facade.

The Lancashire Building addition is a two-story structure, two bays wide and measuring 152 feet (46 m) by 86 feet (26 m). Three pairs of double-hung wooden windows are set into a facade on the second story. The boiler house is a one-story brick building with bricked-in windows, facing State Street.
