= Richland Township, Montcalm County, Michigan =

Richland Township, Michigan
- Township
- Location within Michigan Location within the United States
- Coordinates: 43°24′16″N 84°55′12″W
- Country: United States
- State: Michigan
- County: Montcalm

Area
  - Total: 36.2 sq mi (94 km^{2})
  - Land: 35.6 sq mi (92 km^{2})
  - Water: 0.6 sq mi (1.6 km^{2})
- Elevation: 837 ft (255 m)

Population (2020)
  - Total: 2,646
  - Density: 74.3/sq mi (28.7/km^{2})
- Time zone: UTC-5 (Eastern (EST))
  - Summer (DST): UTC-4 (EDT)
- ZIP codes: 48891 (Vestaburg); 48877 (Riverdale); 48829 (Edmore)
- FIPS code: 26-117-68300
- GNIS feature ID: 1626972
- Website: richland-township.com

Richland Township is a civil township of Montcalm County in the U.S. state of Michigan. The population was 2,646 at the 2020 census, down from 2,778 in 2010.

== Geography ==
The township is in the northeast corner of Montcalm County, bordered to the north by Isabella County and to the east by Gratiot County. State highway M-46 crosses the township, leading west to Edmore and east to St. Louis. Stanton, the Montcalm county seat, is to the southwest.

According to the U.S. Census Bureau, Richland Township has a total area of 36.2 square miles (94 km^{2}), of which 35.6 square miles (92 km^{2}) are land and 0.6 square miles (1.6 km^{2}), or 1.56%, are water. The township is drained by the Pine River, which winds across the center of the township and ultimately flows east to the Chippewa River, part of the Saginaw River watershed leading to Lake Huron.

=== Communities ===
- Vestaburg is an unincorporated community in the southern part of the township at 43°23′57″N 84°54′20″W The community was founded by George W. O'Donnell in 1874, who named it after his wife, Vesta Burgess O'Donnell. He recorded a plat in 1875 and became the first postmaster on September 14, 1875. The office closed on November 30, 1877, but re-opened on January 2, 1878. The Vestaburg post office, with ZIP code 48891, serves most of Richland Township, as well as a small portion of Home Township to the west, as well as portions of townships to the south and west.

== Demographics ==
Historical population
Census	Pop.	Note	%±
1870	88		—
1880	880		900.0%
1890	1,140		29.5%
1900	1,136		−0.4%
1910	1,200		5.6%
1920	1,104		−8.0%
1930	900		−18.5%
1940	1,029		14.3%
1950	1,125		9.3%
1960	1,502		33.5%
1970	1,832		22.0%
1980	2,421		32.2%
1990	2,355		−2.7%
2000	2,868		21.8%
2010	2,778		−3.1%
2020	2,646		−4.8%
U.S. Decennial Census

As of the census of 2000, there were 2,868 people, 1,052 households, and 792 families residing in the township. The population density was 79.9 inhabitants per square mile (30.8/km^{2}). There were 1,245 housing units at an average density of 34.7 per square mile (13.4/km^{2}). The racial makeup of the township was 98.15% White, 0.24% African American, 0.42% Native American, 0.24% Asian, 0.14% from other races, and 0.80% from two or more races. Hispanic or Latino of any race were 1.81% of the population.

There were 1,052 households, out of which 37.1% had children under the age of 18 living with them, 60.6% were married couples living together, 9.0% had a female householder with no husband present, and 24.7% were non-families. 20.0% of all households were made up of individuals, and 8.2% had someone living alone who was 65 years of age or older. The average household size was 2.71 and the average family size was 3.08.

In the township the population was spread out, with 29.0% under the age of 18, 7.0% from 18 to 24, 28.1% from 25 to 44, 24.4% from 45 to 64, and 11.5% who were 65 years of age or older. The median age was 36 years. For every 100 females, there were 101.7 males. For every 100 females age 18 and over, there were 98.9 males.

The median income for a household in the township was $34,847, and the median income for a family was $38,913. Males had a median income of $30,028 versus $20,871 for females. The per capita income for the township was $14,889. About 6.5% of families and 10.5% of the population were below the poverty line, including 10.5% of those under age 18 and 14.5% of those age 65 or over.
