= Arcada Township, Michigan =

- Civil township
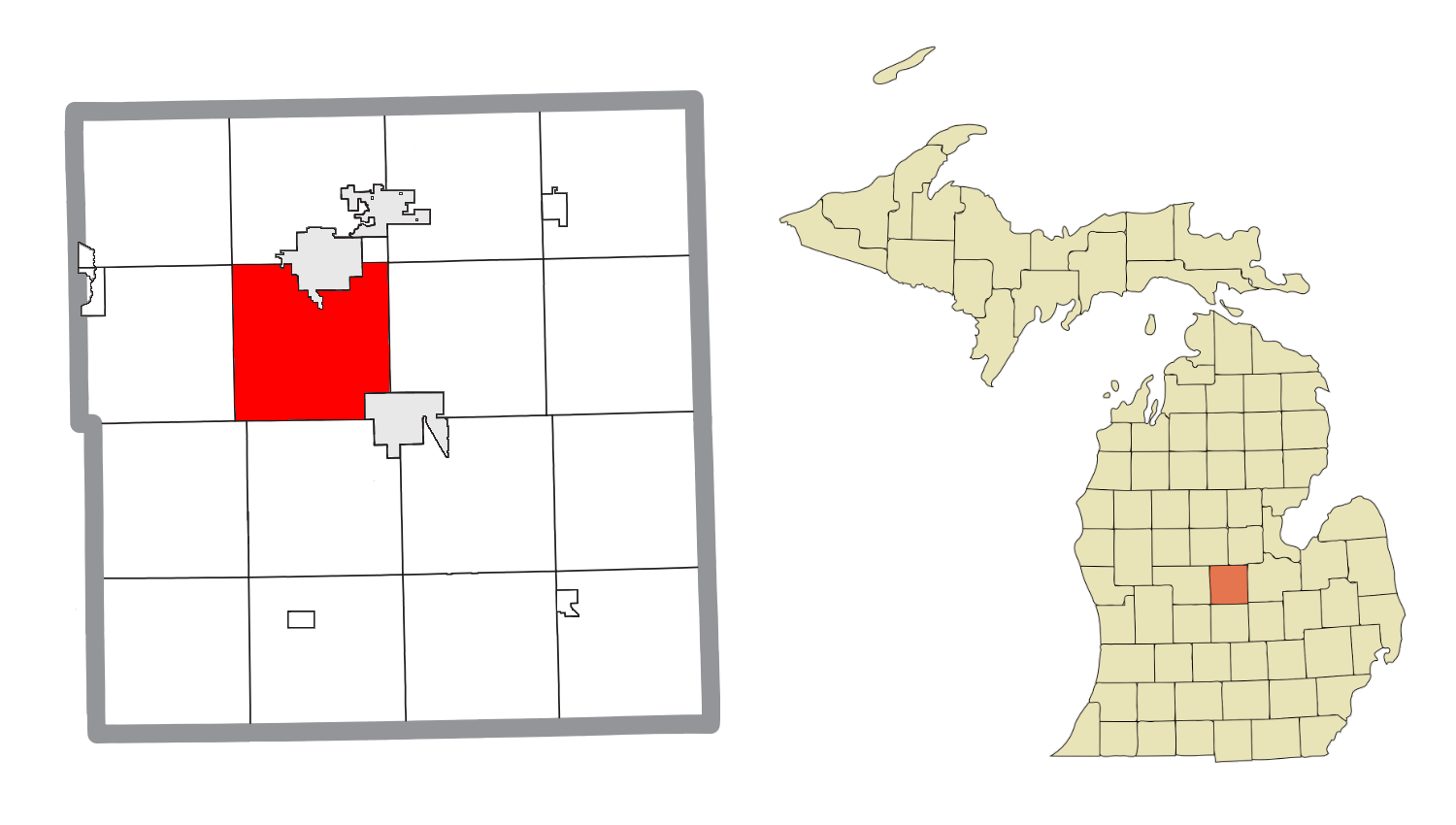
- Location within Gratiot County

- Location within the state of Michigan Location within the United States
- Coordinates: 43°20′52″N 84°40′35″W
- Country: United States
- State: Michigan
- County: Gratiot

Area
  - Total: 32.7 sq mi (84.7 km^{2})
  - Land: 32.5 sq mi (84.3 km^{2})
  - Water: 0.15 sq mi (0.4 km^{2})
- Elevation: 741 ft (226 m)

Population (2020)
  - Total: 1,671
  - Density: 51.3/sq mi (19.8/km^{2})
- Time zone: UTC-5 (Eastern (EST))
  - Summer (DST): UTC-4 (EDT)
- FIPS code: 26-03260
- GNIS feature ID: 1625843
- Website: https://arcadami.gov/

Arcada Township is a civil township of Gratiot County in the U.S. state of Michigan. As of the 2020 census, the township population was 1,671.

== Communities ==
- The city of Alma is on the northern edge of the township, but is administratively autonomous.
- Eugene was a post office here from 1894 until 1902.
- The city of Ithaca is at the southeast corner of the township, but is administratively autonomous.

== Geography ==
According to the United States Census Bureau, the township has a total area of 32.7 square miles (85 km^{2}), of which 32.5 square miles (84 km^{2}) is land and 0.2 square miles (0.52 km^{2}) (0.49%) is water.

== Demographics ==
As of the census of 2000, there were 1,708 people, 655 households, and 495 families residing in the township. The population density was 52.5 inhabitants per square mile (20.3/km^{2}). There were 693 housing units at an average density of 21.3 per square mile (8.2/km^{2}). The racial makeup of the township was 96.08% White, 0.12% African American, 0.18% Native American, 0.41% Asian, 1.23% from other races, and 1.99% from two or more races. Hispanic or Latino of any race were 4.63% of the population.

There were 655 households, out of which 33.9% had children under the age of 18 living with them, 64.9% were married couples living together, 8.1% had a female householder with no husband present, and 24.4% were non-families. 21.4% of all households were made up of individuals, and 11.1% had someone living alone who was 65 years of age or older. The average household size was 2.60 and the average family size was 3.01.

In the township the population was spread out, with 26.4% under the age of 18, 6.4% from 18 to 24, 26.3% from 25 to 44, 26.6% from 45 to 64, and 14.3% who were 65 years of age or older. The median age was 39 years. For every 100 females, there were 98.6 males. For every 100 females age 18 and over, there were 95.5 males.

The median income for a household in the township was $44,097, and the median income for a family was $50,161. Males had a median income of $36,063 versus $23,611 for females. The per capita income for the township was $20,781. About 5.6% of families and 7.5% of the population were below the poverty line, including 8.4% of those under age 18 and 4.0% of those age 65 or over.
