= Pine River (Chippewa River tributary) =

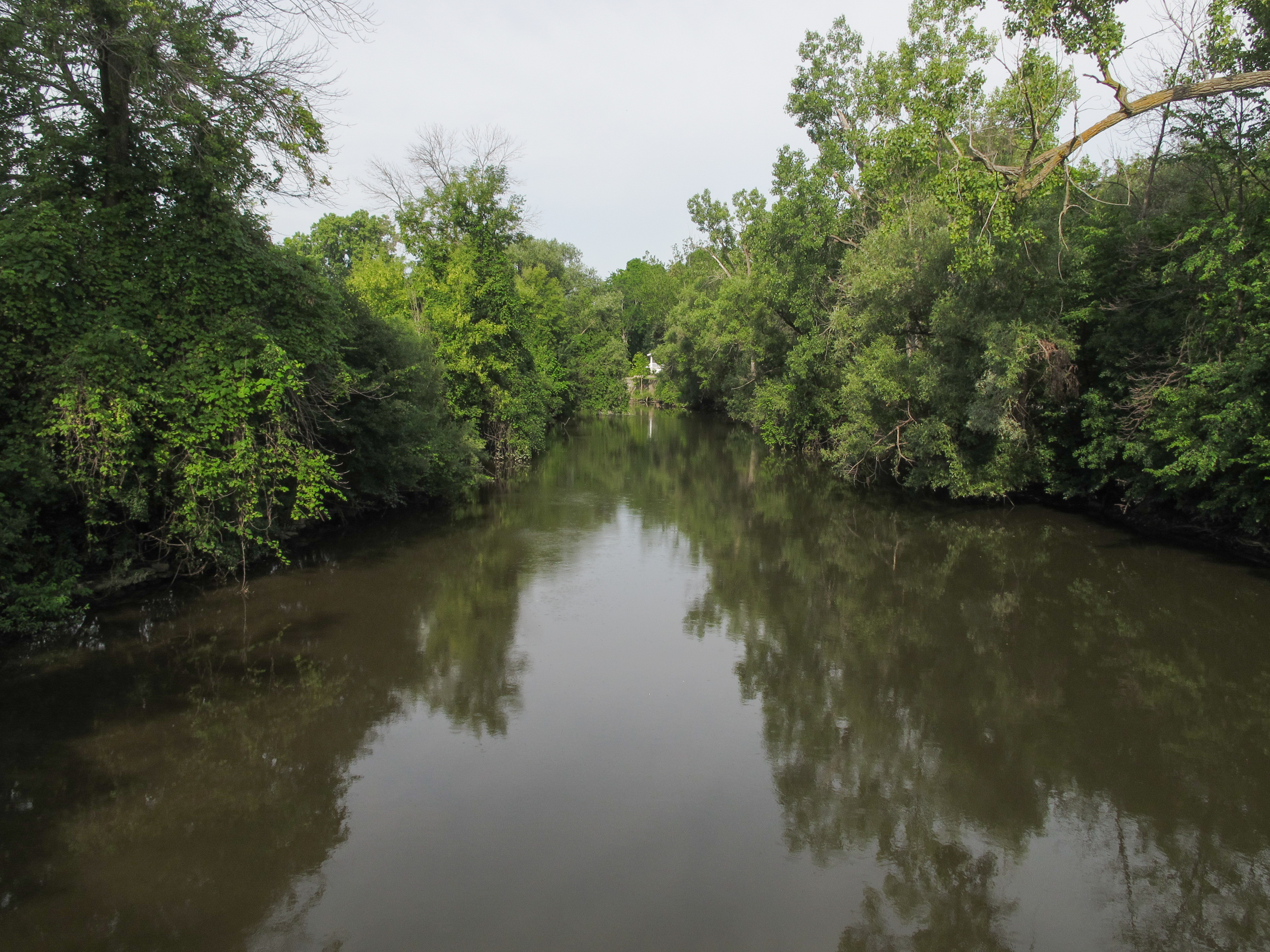
- The Pine River in Alma

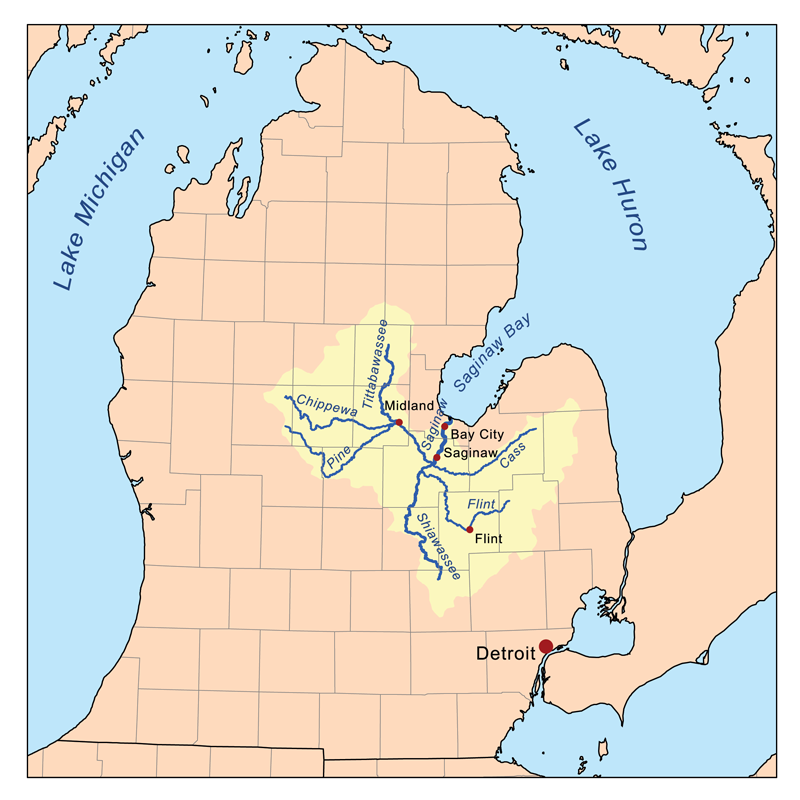
- Map of the Saginaw River watershed showing the Pine River as one of its major tributaries

Location
- Country: United States

Physical characteristics
- Source
  - location: Wheatland Township, Mecosta County, Michigan
- Mouth
  - location: Chippewa River
  - elevation: 600 ft (180 m)
- Length: 103 mi (166 km)
- Discharge
  - location: mouth
  - average: 368.7 cu ft/s (10.44 m^{3}/s) (estimate)

Basin features
- River system: Saginaw River

The Pine River is a 103-mile-long (166 km) river in the Lower Peninsula of the U.S. state of Michigan. The Pine River is a tributary of the Chippewa River and is thus part of the Saginaw River drainage basin.

The river rises in Wheatland Township in southeast Mecosta County at 43°35′09″N 85°08′34″W. It flows southeast into southwest Isabella County. It turns south through northeast Montcalm County and Gratiot County, where it turns to the northeast, continuing through the cities of Alma and St. Louis. It enters Midland County and joins the Chippewa River at 43°36′06″N 84°17′33″W approximately two miles before the Chippewa joins the Tittabawassee River on the west side of the city of Midland.

The river was contaminated by the Michigan Chemical Corporation (later Velsicol Chemical Corporation) in St. Louis and has been subject to extensive clean-up efforts.

== Tributaries and features ==
- (left) Sucker Creek
- (left) Bush Creek
  - (right) Taylor Drain
  - (left) Rook Drain
- (left) Horse Creek
- (right) Sugar Creek
- (right) Honeyoey Creek
  - (left) Coles Creek
    - Peterman Lake
  - Madison Lake
- (left) Newark and Arcadia Drain
- (left) Carpenter Creek
- (left) Twin Lake
- (left) Robbins Lake
- (left) Deaner Lake
- (right) Mud Creek
  - (left) Bass Lake Drain
- (right) North Branch Pine River
  - (left) Cedar Drain
  - (right) Thatcher Creek
- (left) Wolf Creek
  - (right) Offnear Lake
  - (left) Cedar Lake
    - (right) Marl Lake
- (left) Skunk Creek
- (left) South Branch Pine River
  - Blanchard Millpond
    - (left) Decker Creek
    - (right) Jewel Creek
- (right) Pony Creek
  - (left) Halls Lake
  - (right) Big Eldred Lake
    - Little Eldred Lake
- (left) Miller Creek
  - Meeker Lake
- Pine Lake

== Drainage basin ==
- Gratiot County
  - City of Alma
  - Arcada Township
  - Bethany Township
  - Emerson Township
  - New Haven Township
  - Newark Township
  - Pine River Township
  - City of St. Louis
  - Seville Township
  - Sumner Township
  - Wheeler Township
- Isabella County
  - Broomfield Township
  - Fremont Township
  - Lincoln Township
  - Rolland Township
- Mecosta County
  - Millbrook Township
  - Wheatland Township
- Midland County
  - Homer Township
  - Jasper Township
  - Lee Township
  - Mount Haley Township
  - Porter Township
- Montcalm County
  - Richland Township
  - Ferris Township
  - Home Township
