= Seville Township, Michigan =

- Civil township
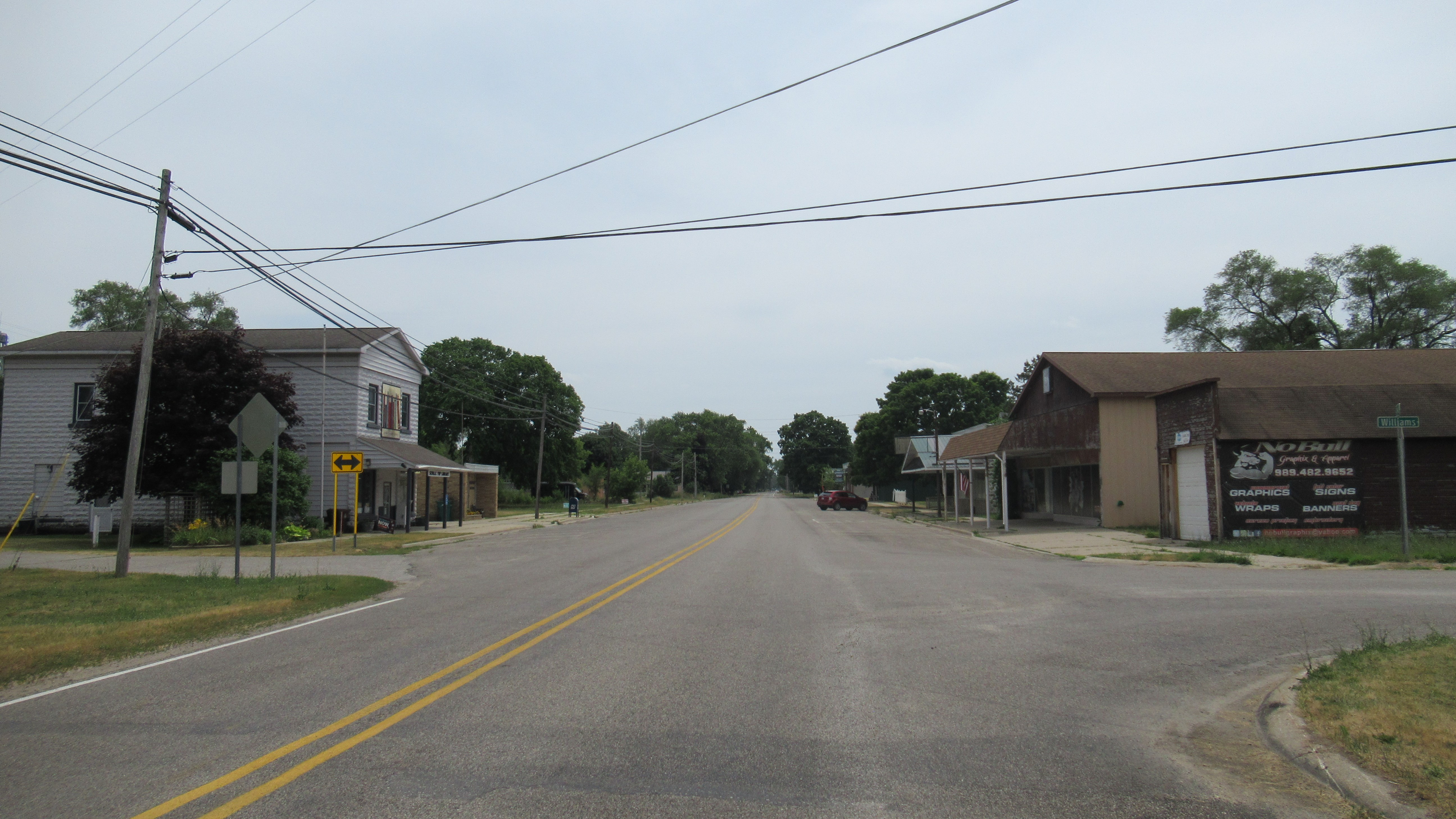
- The unincorporated community of Riverdale

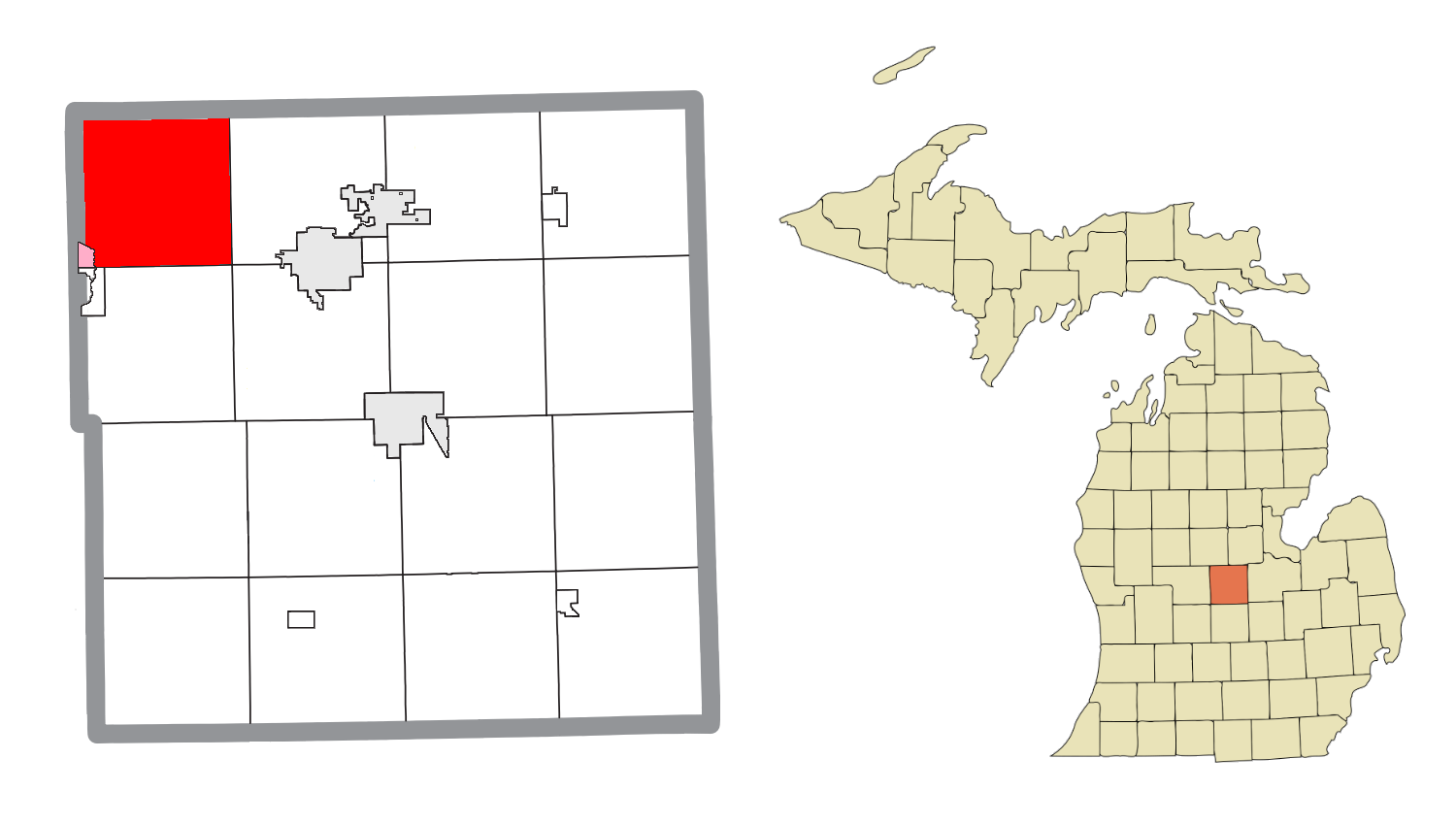
- Location within Gratiot County (red) and an administered portion of the Riverdale CDP (pink)

- Location within the state of Michigan Location within the United States
- Coordinates: 43°24′56″N 84°47′47″W
- Country: United States
- State: Michigan
- County: Gratiot

Area
  - Total: 35.9 sq mi (92.9 km^{2})
  - Land: 35.8 sq mi (92.6 km^{2})
  - Water: 0.12 sq mi (0.3 km^{2})
- Elevation: 817 ft (249 m)

Population (2020)
  - Total: 2,132
  - Density: 59.6/sq mi (23.0/km^{2})
- Time zone: UTC-5 (Eastern (EST))
  - Summer (DST): UTC-4 (EDT)
- FIPS code: 26-72580
- GNIS feature ID: 1627060
- Website: https://sevilletownship.com/

Seville Township is a civil township of Gratiot County in the U.S. state of Michigan. The population was 2,132 at the 2020 census.

== Communities ==
- Elwell is an unincorporated community in the township at 43°23′15″N 84°44′45″W. The FIPS place code is 25800. It was platted in 1911.
- Riverdale is an unincorporated community and census-designated place in the township on the Pine River at 43°23′08″N 84°50′08″W. The FIPS place code is 68720.

== Geography ==
According to the United States Census Bureau, the township has a total area of 35.9 square miles (93 km^{2}), of which 35.7 square miles (92 km^{2}) is land and 0.1 square miles (0.26 km^{2}) (0.36%) is water.

== Demographics ==
As of the census of 2000, there were 2,375 people, 866 households, and 661 families residing in the township. The population density was 66.4 inhabitants per square mile (25.6/km^{2}). There were 907 housing units at an average density of 25.4 per square mile (9.8/km^{2}). The racial makeup of the township was 97.43% White, 0.21% African American, 0.42% Native American, 0.04% Asian, 0.55% from other races, and 1.35% from two or more races. Hispanic or Latino of any race were 2.23% of the population.

There were 866 households, out of which 38.6% had children under the age of 18 living with them, 62.8% were married couples living together, 9.0% had a female householder with no husband present, and 23.6% were non-families. 18.1% of all households were made up of individuals, and 7.2% had someone living alone who was 65 years of age or older. The average household size was 2.70 and the average family size was 3.05.

In the township the population was spread out, with 28.8% under the age of 18, 7.0% from 18 to 24, 30.1% from 25 to 44, 22.8% from 45 to 64, and 11.4% who were 65 years of age or older. The median age was 36 years. For every 100 females, there were 103.7 males. For every 100 females age 18 and over, there were 97.4 males.

The median income for a household in the township was $40,809, and the median income for a family was $45,759. Males had a median income of $30,781 versus $21,888 for females. The per capita income for the township was $16,400. About 7.9% of families and 12.8% of the population were below the poverty line, including 18.0% of those under age 18 and 17.2% of those age 65 or over.
