= 2012 Michigan House of Representatives election =

- November 6, 2012

All 110 seats in the Michigan House of Representatives 56 seats needed for a majority
- Turnout: 4,424,051 (59.34%)
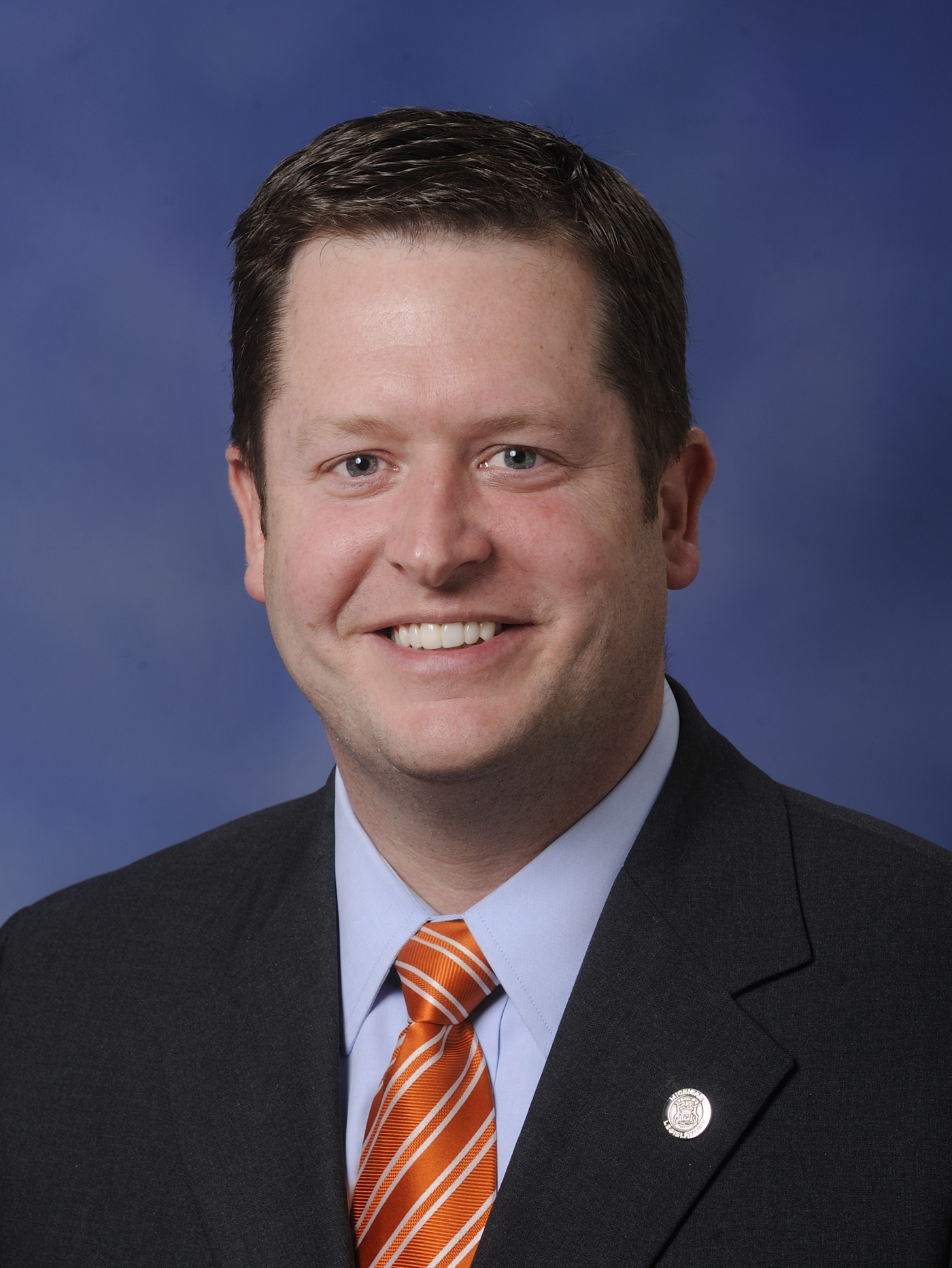

	Majority party	Minority party
Leader	James "Jase" Bolger	Tim Greimel
Party	Republican	Democratic
Leader since	January 1, 2011	January 1, 2013
Leader's seat	63rd district	29th district
Last election	63	47
Seats before	64	46
Seats after	59	51
Seat change	▼5	▲5
Popular vote	2,036,169	2,387,882
Percentage	46.03%	53.97%
- Democratic gain Republican gain Democratic hold Republican hold Republican: 50–60% 60–70% 70–80% 80–90% >90% Democratic: 40–50% 50–60% 60–70% 70–80% 80–90% >90%
Speaker before election
Jase Bolger
Republican
Elected Speaker
Jase Bolger
Republican

The 2012 Michigan House of Representatives elections were held on November 6, 2012, with partisan primaries to select the parties' nominees in the various districts on August 7, 2012. The Republican Party retained its majority in the House of Representatives despite losing the popular vote.

== Rep. Roy Schmidt scandal ==
State Representative Roy Schmidt was defeated for re-election after assisting in engineering an election-rigging scandal by which he switched from the Democratic to the Republican Party and recruited a straw candidate to run as a Democrat in order to ensure a swift re-election. The scandal ultimately cost him his seat in the House. Speaker of the House James "Jase" Bolger was also implicated in the scandal, and his race for the 63rd district was made competitive because of his role in it. The matter was referred to Ingham County Circuit Court Judge Rosemarie Aquilina, serving as a one-person grand jury, who ruled in August 2013 that neither Schmidt nor Bogler had committed a crime.

== Term limits ==
Due to the term limit provisions in the Michigan Constitution, the following Members were ineligible to stand for election again to the House:

- Dave Agema (R-74th district)
- Joan Bauer (D-68th district)
- Barb Byrum (D-67th district)
- Bob Constan (D-16th district)
- Jud Gilbert (R-81st district)
- Rick Hammel (D-48th district)
- Ken Horn (R-94th district)
- Marty Knollenberg (R-41st district)
- Richard LeBlanc (D-18th district)
- Steven Lindberg (D-109th district)
- Mark Meadows (D-69th district)
- Chuck Moss (R-40th district)
- Paul Opsommer (R-93rd district)

== Predictions ==
Source	Ranking	As of
Governing	Lean R	October 24, 2012

== Results ==
=== Districts 1–28 ===
1st District (Wayne (Harper Woods, Grosse Pointe Woods, Grosse Pointe Township, far northeast Detroit))
Party	Candidate	Votes	%
Democratic	Brian Banks	27,843	70.79
Republican	Dan Schulte	11,489	29.21
Total votes		39,332	100.0
Democratic hold			

2nd District (Wayne (southeast Detroit, Grosse Pointe, Grosse Pointe Park, Grosse Pointe Farms))
Party	Candidate	Votes	%
Democratic	Alberta Tinsley-Talabi (incumbent)	28,990	71.78
Republican	Daniel Grano	10,459	25.89
Green	Hans Christopher Barbe	938	2.23
Total votes		40,387	100.0
Democratic hold			

3rd District (Wayne (north central Detroit))
Party	Candidate	Votes	%
Democratic	John Olumba (incumbent)	33,938	95.86
Republican	Dolores Brodersen	1,029	2.91
Green	Louis Novak	436	1.23
Total votes		35,403	100.0
Democratic hold			

4th District (Wayne (central Detroit, Hamtramck))
Party	Candidate	Votes	%
Democratic	Rose Mary Robinson	27,512	95.30
Republican	Ron Michalski	1,356	4.70
Total votes		28,868	100.0
Democratic hold			

5th District (Wayne (southwest Detroit))
Party	Candidate	Votes	%
Democratic	Fred Durhal, Jr. (incumbent)	22,996	94.21
Republican	Samuel Rodriguez	1,413	5.79
Total votes		24,409	100.0
Democratic hold			

6th District (Wayne (southwest Detroit, downtown Detroit, near eastside of Detroit, Ecorse, River Rouge))
Party	Candidate	Votes	%
Democratic	Rashida Tlaib (incumbent)	28,794	92.19
Republican	Darrin Daigle	1,588	5.08
Green	Elena Herrada	853	2.73
Total votes		31,235	100.0
Democratic hold			

7th District (Wayne (north-central Detroit, Highland Park))
Party	Candidate	Votes	%
Democratic	Thomas Stallworth III (incumbent)	39,384	97.98
Republican	Mark Ashley Price	813	2.02
Total votes		40,197	100.0
Democratic hold			

8th District (Wayne (northwest Detroit))
Party	Candidate	Votes	%
Democratic	David Nathan (incumbent)	38,792	96.92
Republican	David Porter	1,231	3.08
Total votes		40,023	100.0
Democratic hold			

9th District (Wayne (west Detroit, Dearborn (part)))
Party	Candidate	Votes	%
Democratic	Harvey Santana (incumbent)	32,063	95.34
Republican	Rene Simpson	1,567	4.66
Total votes		33,630	100.0
Democratic hold			

10th District (Wayne (far northwest Detroit, Redford Township))
Party	Candidate	Votes	%
Democratic	Phil Cavanagh (incumbent)	36,190	86.43
Republican	Jasmine Bridges	5,682	13.57
Total votes		41,872	100.0
Democratic hold			

11th District (Wayne (Garden City, Inkster, Dearborn Heights (part), Livonia (part), Westland (part))
Party	Candidate	Votes	%
Democratic	David Knezek	27,626	71.75
Republican	Kathleen Kopczyk	10,875	28.25
Total votes		38,501	100.0
Democratic hold			

12th District (Wayne (Romulus, Taylor, Van Buren Township (part))
Party	Candidate	Votes	%
Democratic	Doug Geiss (incumbent)	28,498	75.21
Republican	Joanne Michalik	9,395	24.79
Total votes		37,893	100.0
Democratic hold			

13th District (Wayne (Allen Park, Southgate, Dearborn Heights (part))
Party	Candidate	Votes	%
Democratic	Andrew Kandrevas (incumbent)	25,496	64.56
Republican	Tony Amorose	13,996	35.44
Total votes		39,492	100.0
Democratic hold			

14th District (Wayne (Lincoln Park, Melvindale, Riverview, Wyandotte))
Party	Candidate	Votes	%
Democratic	Paul Clemente (incumbent)	23,993	70.92
Republican	Edward Gubics	8,763	25.90
Libertarian	Loel Gnadt	1,076	3.18
Total votes		33,832	100.0
Democratic hold			

15th District (Wayne (Dearborn—excluding northeast portions))
Party	Candidate	Votes	%
Democratic	George Darany (incumbent)	26,465	75.04
Republican	Priscilla Parness	8,804	24.96
Total votes		35,269	100.0
Democratic hold			

16th District (Wayne (Wayne, Westland (all but northeast corner))
Party	Candidate	Votes	%
Democratic	Robert Kosowski	25,147	67.65
Republican	Mary Stargell	10,277	27.65
Libertarian	Steven Boron	1,039	2.80
Total votes		36,463	100.0
Democratic hold			

17th District (Monroe (Monroe, Ash Township, Berlin Township, Exeter Township, Frenchtown Township, London Township), Wayne (Flat Rock, Rockwood, Sumpter Township))
Party	Candidate	Votes	%
Democratic	Bill LaVoy	22,339	61.32
Republican	Anne Rossio	14,092	38.68
Total votes		36,431	100.0
Democratic hold			

18th District (Macomb (Eastpointe, St. Clair Shores))
Party	Candidate	Votes	%
Democratic	Sarah Roberts	29,438	63.54
Republican	Candice Rusie	15,671	33.82
Libertarian	Daniel Flamand	1,223	2.64
Total votes		46,332	100.0
Democratic hold			

19th District (Wayne (Livonia, excluding southeast tip))
Party	Candidate	Votes	%
Republican	John J. Walsh (incumbent)	29,151	59.94
Democratic	Richard Tannous	19,480	40.06
Total votes		48,631	100.0
Republican hold			

20th District (Wayne (Northville -- portion within county, Northville Township, Plymouth, Plymouth Township, east Canton Township))
Party	Candidate	Votes	%
Republican	Kurt Heise (incumbent)	27,357	56.06
Democratic	Timothy Roraback	21,446	43.94
Total votes		48,803	100.0
Republican hold			

21st District (Wayne (Belleville, Van Buren Township -- excluding northeast portion, Canton Township -- excluding eastern portion))
Party	Candidate	Votes	%
Democratic	Dian Slavens (incumbent)	26,605	61.59
Republican	Joe Barnabei	16,590	38.41
Total votes		43,195	100.0
Democratic hold			

22nd District (Macomb (Roseville, Warren -- eastern portion))
Party	Candidate	Votes	%
Democratic	Harold Haugh (incumbent)	24,077	70.38
Republican	Art Blundell	10,134	29.62
Total votes		34,211	100.0
Democratic hold			

23rd District (Wayne (Brownstown Township, Gibraltar, Grosse Ile Township, Huron Township, Trenton, Woodhaven))
Party	Candidate	Votes	%
Republican	Pat Somerville (incumbent)	22,810	50.49
Democratic	Tom Boritzki	22,371	49.51
Total votes		45,181	100.0
Republican hold			

24th District (Macomb (Harrison Township, northern Clinton Township, southwest Macomb Township))
Party	Candidate	Votes	%
Republican	Anthony G. Forlini (incumbent)	22,360	54.71
Democratic	Philip Kurczewski	18,508	45.29
Total votes		40,868	100.0
Republican hold			

25th District (Macomb (east Sterling Heights, northeast Warren))
Party	Candidate	Votes	%
Democratic	Henry Yanez	20,771	51.43
Republican	Sean Clark	19,617	48.57
Total votes		40,388	100.0
Democratic hold			

26th District (Oakland (Madison Heights, Royal Oak))
Party	Candidate	Votes	%
Democratic	Jim Townsend (incumbent)	26,094	60.36
Republican	Mark Bliss	15,502	35.86
Libertarian	James Young	1,636	3.78
Total votes		43,232	100.0
Democratic hold			

27th District (Oakland (Berkley, Ferndale, Hazel Park, Huntington Woods, Oak Park, Pleasant Ridge, Royal Oak Township))
Party	Candidate	Votes	%
Democratic	Ellen Cogen Lipton (incumbent)	34,389	75.61
Republican	Ezra Drissman	9,253	20.34
Libertarian	John Wierzbicki	1,841	4.05
Total votes		45,483	100.0
Democratic hold			

28th District (Macomb (west and central Warren, Center Line))
Party	Candidate	Votes	%
Democratic	Jon Switalski (incumbent)	24,025	71.49
Republican	Steven Klusek	9,580	28.51
Total votes		33,605	100.0
Democratic hold			

=== Districts 29–55 ===
29th District (Oakland (Auburn Hills, Pontiac, Keego Harbor, Sylvan Lake, Orchard Lake))
Party	Candidate	Votes	%
Democratic	Tim Greimel (incumbent)	25,577	77.40
Republican	Brian Stebick	7,467	22.60
Total votes		33,044	100.0
Democratic hold			

30th District (Macomb (west Sterling Heights, Utica, southeast Shelby Township))
Party	Candidate	Votes	%
Republican	Jeff Farrington (incumbent)	18,160	53.25
Democratic	Joseph Bogdan	15,943	46.75
Total votes		34,103	100.0
Republican hold			

31st District (Macomb (south Clinton Township, Fraser, Mount Clemens))
Party	Candidate	Votes	%
Democratic	Marilyn Lane (incumbent)	24,443	61.74
Republican	Lynn Evans	13,404	33.86
Libertarian	James Miller	1,742	4.40
Total votes		39,589	100.0
Democratic hold			

32nd District (Macomb (Chesterfield Township, New Baltimore), St. Clair (Casco Township, Columbus Township, Ira Township, Kenockee Township, Kimball Township, Riley Township, Wales Township))
Party	Candidate	Votes	%
Republican	Andrea LaFontaine (incumbent)	22,842	58.62
Democratic	Sheri Smith	16,122	41.38
Total votes		38,964	100.0
Republican hold			

33rd District (Macomb (Armada Township, Lenox Township, Macomb Township -- all but southwest portion, Ray Township, Richmond -- portion within county, Memphis -- portion within county))
Party	Candidate	Votes	%
Republican	Ken Goike (incumbent)	24,163	61.91
Democratic	Marth O'Kray	14,869	38.09
Total votes		39,032	100.0
Republican hold			

34th District (Genesee (Flint -- excluding southeast and central portions))
Party	Candidate	Votes	%
Democratic	Woodrow Stanley (incumbent)	28,816	86.92
Republican	Bruce Rogers	4,336	13.08
Total votes		33,152	100.0
Democratic hold			

35th District (Oakland (Lathrup Village, Southfield, Southfield Township))
Party	Candidate	Votes	%
Democratic	Rudy Hobbs (incumbent)	43,993	83.03
Republican	Timothy Sulowski	8,989	16.97
Total votes		52,982	100.0
Democratic hold			

36th District (Macomb (Bruce Township, Shelby Township -- excluding southeast portion, Washington Township))
Party	Candidate	Votes	%
Republican	Pete Lund (incumbent)	26,870	64.14
Democratic	Robert Murphy	15,024	35.86
Total votes		41,894	100.0
Republican hold			

37th District (Oakland (Farmington, Farmington Hills))
Party	Candidate	Votes	%
Democratic	Vicki Barnett (incumbent)	29,554	61.69
Republican	Bruce Lilley	18,354	38.31
Total votes		47,908	100.0
Democratic hold			

38th District (Oakland (Lyon Township, Northville-portion within county, Novi, Novi Township, South Lyon, Walled Lake))
Party	Candidate	Votes	%
Republican	Hugh Crawford (incumbent)	26,460	59.20
Democratic	Chuck Tindall	18,235	40.80
Total votes		44,695	100.0
Republican hold			

39th District (Oakland (Commerce Township, western West Bloomfield Township, Wixom))
Party	Candidate	Votes	%
Republican	Klint Kesto	24,382	53.25
Democratic	Pam Jackson	21,403	46.75
Total votes		45,785	100.0
Republican hold			

40th District (Oakland (Birmingham, Bloomfield Hills, Bloomfield Township, eastern West Bloomfield Township))
Party	Candidate	Votes	%
Republican	Michael McCready	31,913	57.01
Democratic	Dorian Coston	22,757	40.65
Libertarian	Steve Burgis	1,312	2.34
Total votes		55,982	100.0
Republican hold			

41st District (Oakland (Clawson, Troy))
Party	Candidate	Votes	%
Republican	Martin Howrylak	23,404	50.46
Democratic	Mary Kerwin	22,977	49.54
Total votes		46,381	100.0
Republican hold			

42nd District (Livingston (Brighton, Brighton Township, Genoa Township, Green Oak Township, Hamburg Township, Putnam Township))
Party	Candidate	Votes	%
Republican	Bill Rogers (incumbent)	31,510	63.25
Democratic	Shanda Willis	16,476	33.07
Libertarian	James Lewis	1,830	3.67
Total votes		49,816	100.0
Republican gain from Democratic			

43rd District (Oakland (Clarkston, Lake Angelus, Independence Township, Waterford Township -- excluding southwest portion))
Party	Candidate	Votes	%
Republican	Gail Haines (incumbent)	26,554	60.76
Democratic	Neil Billington	17,149	39.24
Total votes		43,703	100.0
Republican hold			

44th District (Oakland (Highland Township, Milford Township, Springfield Township, southwest Waterford Township, White Lake Township))
Party	Candidate	Votes	%
Republican	Eileen Kowall (incumbent)	29,772	62.79
Democratic	Tom Crawford	15,744	33.20
Libertarian	Scott Poquette	1,901	4.01
Total votes		47,417	100.0
Republican hold			

45th District (Oakland (southwest Oakland Township, Rochester Hills, Rochester))
Party	Candidate	Votes	%
Republican	Tom McMillin (incumbent)	25,972	56.00
Democratic	Joanna VanRaaphorst	20,408	44.00
Total votes		46,380	100.0
Republican hold			

46th District (Oakland (Addison Township, Brandon Township, Oakland Township -- all but southwest portion, Orion Township, Oxford Township))
Party	Candidate	Votes	%
Republican	Bradford Jacobsen (incumbent)	27,764	63.72
Democratic	Daniel Sargent	15,810	36.28
Total votes		43,574	100.0
Republican hold			

47th District (Livingston (Cohoctah Township, Conway Township, Deerfield Township, Handy Township, Hartland Township, Howell, Howell Township, Iosco Township, Marion Township, Tyrone Township, Unadilla Township))
Party	Candidate	Votes	%
Republican	Cindy Denby (incumbent)	27,621	64.06
Democratic	Shawn Lowe Desai	13,888	32.21
Libertarian	James Weeks	1,607	3.73
Total votes		43,116	100.0
Republican hold			

48th District (Genesee (Clio, Davison, Davison Township, Forest Township, Genesee Township, Montrose, Montrose Township, Richfield Township, Thetford Township, Vienna Township))
Party	Candidate	Votes	%
Democratic	Pam Faris	27,013	63.77
Republican	Jeffrey Woolman	15,344	36.23
Total votes		42,357	100.0
Democratic hold			

49th District (Genesee (southwest Flint, Flint Township, Flushing, Mount Morris, Mount Morris Township, Swartz Creek))
Party	Candidate	Votes	%
Democratic	Jim Ananich (incumbent)	28,275	74.51
Republican	Robert Daunt	9,674	25.49
Total votes		37,949	100.0
Democratic hold			

50th District (Genesee (Burton, Grand Blanc, Grand Blanc Township, Mundy Township))
Party	Candidate	Votes	%
Democratic	Charles Smiley (incumbent)	26,678	60.85
Republican	Miles Gadola	17,165	39.15
Total votes		43,843	100.0
Democratic hold			

51st District (Genesee (Argentine Township, Atlas Township, Clayton Township, Fenton, Fenton Township, Flushing Township, Gaines Township, Linden), Oakland (Groveland Township, Holly Township, Rose Township))
Party	Candidate	Votes	%
Republican	Joseph Graves (incumbent)	26,170	54.33
Democratic	Steven Losey	22,001	45.67
Total votes		48,171	100.0
Republican hold			

52nd District (Washtenaw (Bridgewater Township, Chelsea, Dexter Township, Freedom Township, Lima Township, Lodi Township, Lyndon Township, Manchester Township, Northfield Township, Salem Township, Saline, Saline Township, Scio Township, Sharon Township, Sylvan Township
Party	Candidate	Votes	%
Democratic	Gretchen Driskell	26,647	53.02
Republican	Mark Ouimet (incumbent)	23,610	46.98
Total votes		50,257	100.0
Democratic gain from Republican			

53rd District (Washtenaw (south Ann Arbor))
Party	Candidate	Votes	%
Democratic	Jeff Irwin (incumbent)	32,576	80.93
Republican	John Spisak	7,672	19.07
Total votes		40,248	100.0
Democratic hold			

54th District (Washtenaw (Superior Township, Ypsilanti, Ypsilanti Township))
Party	Candidate	Votes	%
Democratic	David Rutledge (incumbent)	29,949	77.45
Republican	Bill Emmerich	8,722	22.55
Total votes		38,671	100.0
Democratic hold			

55th District (Washtenaw (north Ann Arbor, Ann Arbor Township, Augusta Township, Milan -- portion within county, Pittsfield Township, York Township))
Party	Candidate	Votes	%
Democratic	Adam Zemke	26,197	64.46
Republican	Owen Diaz	13,029	32.06
Green	David McMahon	1,415	3.48
Total votes		40,641	100.0
Democratic gain from Republican			

=== Districts 56–83 ===
56th District (Monroe (Bedford Township, Berlin Township, Dundee Township, Erie Township, Ida Township, LaSalle Township, London Township, Luna Pier, Milan -- portion within county, Milan Township, Monroe Township, Petersberg, Raisinville Township, Summerfield Township
Party	Candidate	Votes	%
Republican	Dale Zorn (incumbent)	23,592	57.64
Democratic	Larry Crider	17,338	42.36
Total votes		40,930	100.0
Republican hold			

57th District (Lenawee (excluding Cambridge Township))
Party	Candidate	Votes	%
Republican	Nancy Jenkins (incumbent)	21,150	52.50
Democratic	James Berryman	19,135	47.50
Total votes		40,285	100.0
Republican hold			

58th District (Branch, Hillsdale)
Party	Candidate	Votes	%
Republican	Kenneth Kurtz (incumbent)	24,438	69.82
Democratic	Amaryllis Thomas	10,565	30.18
Total votes		35,003	100.0
Republican hold			

59th District (Cass (excluding Howard Township, Milton Township, Niles, Ontwa Township, Silver Creek Township), St. Joseph)
Party	Candidate	Votes	%
Republican	Matt Lori (incumbent)	22,510	62.27
Democratic	Mike Moroz	13,640	37.73
Total votes		36,150	100.0
Republican hold			

60th District (Kalamazoo (Kalamazoo, Kalamazoo Township -- most))
Party	Candidate	Votes	%
Democratic	Sean McCann (incumbent)	27,378	74.23
Republican	Michael Perrin	9,504	25.77
Total votes		36,882	100.0
Democratic hold			

61st District (Kalamazoo (Alamo Township, north Kalamazoo Township, Oshtemo Township, Parchment, Portage, Prairie Ronde Township, Texas Township))
Party	Candidate	Votes	%
Republican	Margaret O'Brien (incumbent)	27,726	58.25
Democratic	Michael Martin	19,876	41.75
Total votes		47,602	100.0
Republican hold			

62nd District (Calhoun (Albion, Albion Township, Battle Creek, Bedford Township, Clarence Township, Convis Township, Lee Township, Pennfield Township, Sheridan Township, Springfield))
Party	Candidate	Votes	%
Democratic	Kate Segal (incumbent)	21,129	57.67
Republican	Mark Behnke	15,511	42.33
Total votes		36,640	100.0
Democratic hold			

63rd District (Calhoun (Athens Township, Burlington Township, Clarendon Township, Eckford Township, Emmet Township, Fredonia Township, Homer Township, Leroy Township, Marengo Township, Marshall, Marshall Township, Newton Township, Tekonsha Township), Kalamazoo (Brady T
Party	Candidate	Votes	%
Republican	Jase Bolger (incumbent)	22,196	50.87
Democratic	Bill Farmer	21,440	49.13
Total votes		43,636	100.0
Republican hold			

64th District (Jackson (Concord Township, Hanover Township, Jackson, Napoleon Township, Parma Township, Pulaski Township, Sandstone Township, Spring Arbor Township, Summit Township))
Party	Candidate	Votes	%
Republican	Earl Poleski (incumbent)	20,190	56.21
Democratic	Barbara Shelton	15,729	43.79
Total votes		35,919	100.0
Republican hold			

65th District (Eaton (Brookfield Township, Eaton Township, Eaton Rapids, Hamlin Township), Jackson (Blackman Township, Columbia Township, Grass Lake Township, Henrietta Township, Leoni Township, Liberty Township, Norvell Township, Rives Township, Springport Township, T
Party	Candidate	Votes	%
Republican	Mike Shirkey (incumbent)	22,862	56.81
Democratic	Bonnie Johnson	17,381	43.19
Total votes		40,243	100.0
Republican hold			

66th District (Van Buren, Kalamazoo (Alamo Township, Cooper Township, Parchment))
Party	Candidate	Votes	%
Republican	Aric Nesbitt (incumbent)	22,997	58.56
Democratic	Richard Rajkovich	16,276	41.44
Total votes		39,273	100.0
Republican hold			

67th District (Ingham (Alaiedon Township, Aurelius Township, Bunker Hill Township, Delhi Township, Ingham Township, central and southeast Lansing, Leroy Township, Leslie, Leslie Township, Mason, Onondaga Township, Stockbridge Township, Vevay Township, Wheatfield Townsh
Party	Candidate	Votes	%
Democratic	Tom Cochran	24,916	56.38
Republican	Jeff Oesterle	19,275	43.62
Total votes		44,191	100.0
Democratic hold			

68th District (Ingham (Lansing—excluding southeast and central portions and portion in Eaton County, Lansing Township))
Party	Candidate	Votes	%
Democratic	Andy Schor	29,023	76.61
Republican	Timothy Moede	8,861	23.39
Total votes		37,884	100.0
Democratic hold			

69th District (Ingham (East Lansing -- portion within county), Locke Township, Meridian Township, Williamstown Township))
Party	Candidate	Votes	%
Democratic	Sam Singh	26,200	64.90
Republican	Susan McGillicuddy	14,172	35.10
Total votes		40,372	100.0
Democratic hold			

70th District (Gratiot (Alma, Bethany Township, Emerson Township, Pine River Township, Seville Township, St. Louis), Montcalm)
Party	Candidate	Votes	%
Republican	Rick Outman (incumbent)	17,709	54.46
Democratic	Mike Huckleberry	14,809	45.54
Total votes		32,518	100.0
Republican hold			

71st District (Eaton (excluding Brookfield Township, Eaton Rapids, Eaton Township, Hamlin Township))
Party	Candidate	Votes	%
Democratic	Theresa Abed	24,822	53.43
Republican	Deb Shaughnessy (incumbent)	21,637	46.57
Total votes		46,459	100.0
Democratic gain from Republican			

72nd District (Allegan (Dorr Township, Leighton Township, Wayland, Wayland Township), Kent (Gaines Township, Kentwood))
Party	Candidate	Votes	%
Republican	Ken Yonker	24,653	58.53
Democratic	Scott Urbanowski	15,982	37.95
Libertarian	William Wenzel	1,481	3.52
Total votes		42,116	100.0
Republican hold			

73rd District (Kent (Cannon Township, Courtland Township, East Grand Rapids, Grand Rapids Township, Nelson Township, Oakfield Township, Plainfield Township, Spencer Township))
Party	Candidate	Votes	%
Republican	Peter MacGregor (incumbent)	32,466	63.46
Democratic	G. Scott Schuiling	16,489	32.23
Libertarian	Ron Heeren	1,537	3.0
Constitution	Ted Gerrard	666	1.30
Total votes		50,492	100.0
Republican hold			

74th District (Kent (Algoma Township, Alpine Township, Cedar Springs, Grandville, Rockford, Solon Township, Sparta Township, Tyrone Township, Walker))
Party	Candidate	Votes	%
Republican	Robert VerHeulen	27,406	65.55
Democratic	Richard Erdman	14,406	34.45
Total votes		41,812	100.0
Republican hold			

75th District (Kent (southwest and central Grand Rapids))
Party	Candidate	Votes	%
Democratic	Brandon Dillon (incumbent)	23,593	75.78
Republican	William Nathan Sneller	7,540	24.22
Total votes		31,133	100.0
Democratic hold			

76th District (Kent (north and southeast Grand Rapids))
Party	Candidate	Votes	%
Democratic	Winnie Brinks	23,530	52.06
Republican	Roy Schmidt (incumbent)	12,337	27.30
Republican	Bing Goei (Write-in)	5,484	12.13
Independent	Keith Allard	1,398	3.09
Constitution	William Mohr	1,362	3.01
Libertarian	Patricia Steinport	1,085	2.40
Total votes		45,196	100.0
Democratic gain from Republican			

77th District (Kent (Byron Township, Wyoming))
Party	Candidate	Votes	%
Republican	Thomas Hooker (incumbent)	23,599	60.37
Democratic	Scott Barton	14,191	36.30
Libertarian	Larry Warner	1,300	3.33
Total votes		39,090	100.0
Republican hold			

78th District (Berrien (Baroda Township, Berrien Township, Bertrand Township, Buchanan, Buchanan Township, Chikaming Township, Galien Township, New Buffalo, New Buffalo Township, Niles, Niles Township, Oronoko Township, Pipestone Township, Sodus Township, Three Oaks To
Party	Candidate	Votes	%
Republican	Dave Pagel	23,227	61.08
Democratic	Jack Arbanas	14,802	38.92
Total votes		38,029	100.0
Republican hold			

79th District (Berrien (Bainbridge Township, Benton Charter Township, Benton Harbor, Bridgman, Coloma, Coloma Township, Hager Township, Lake Township, Lincoln Township, Royalton Township, St. Joseph Township, St. Joseph, Watervliet, Watervliet Township))
Party	Candidate	Votes	%
Republican	Al Pscholka (incumbent)	21,490	52.76
Democratic	Jim Hahn	18,630	45.74
Constitution	Carl Oehling	613	1.5
Total votes		40,733	100.0
Republican hold			

80th District (Allegan (excluding Dorr Township, Leighton Township, Wayland, Wayland Township))
Party	Candidate	Votes	%
Republican	Bob Genetski (incumbent)	25,440	62.22
Democratic	Stuart Peet	15,444	37.78
Total votes		40,884	100.0
Republican hold			

81st District (St. Clair (Algonac, Berlin Township, Brockway Township, China Township, Clay Township, Clyde Township, Cottrellville Township, East China Township, Emmet Township, Grant Township, Greenwood Township, Lynn Township, Marine City, Marysville, Mussey Township
Party	Candidate	Votes	%
Republican	Daniel Lauwers	20,929	53.84
Democratic	Patrick Phelan	17,945	46.16
Total votes		38,874	100.0
Republican hold			

82nd District (Lapeer)
Party	Candidate	Votes	%
Republican	Kevin Daley (incumbent)	24,482	58.97
Democratic	John Nugent	17,032	41.03
Total votes		41,514	100.0
Republican hold			

83rd District (Sanilac, St. Clair (Burtchville Township, Fort Gratiot Township, Port Huron))
Party	Candidate	Votes	%
Republican	Paul Muxlow (incumbent)	19,750	55.74
Democratic	Carol Campbell	15,685	44.26
Total votes		35,435	100.0
Republican hold			

=== Districts 84–110 ===
84th District (Huron, Tuscola)
Party	Candidate	Votes	%
Democratic	Terry Brown	21,345	52.61
Republican	Dan Grimshaw	15,480	38.15
Independent	Edward J. Canfield	3,748	9.24
Total votes		40,573	100.0
Democratic gain from Republican			

85th District (Saginaw (Brady Township, Brant Township, Chapin Township, Chesaning Township, Fremont Township, Jonesfield Township, Lakefield Township, Maple Grove Township, Marion Township, Richland Township), Shiawassee)
Party	Candidate	Votes	%
Republican	Ben Glardon (incumbent)	23,185	53.59
Democratic	Paul Ray	17,278	39.93
Independent	Matthew Shepard	2,803	6.48
Total votes		43,266	100.0
Republican hold			

86th District (Ionia (Belding, Easton Township, Ionia, Ionia Township, Orleans Township, Otisco Township), Kent (Ada Township, Bowne Township, Caledonia Township, Cascade Township, Grattan Township, Lowell, Lowell Township, Vergennes Township))
Party	Candidate	Votes	%
Republican	Lisa Posthumus Lyons (incumbent)	30,715	70.23
Democratic	Brian Bosak	13,021	29.77
Total votes		43,736	100.0
Republican hold			

87th District (Barry, Ionia (Berlin Township, Boston Township, Campbell Township, Danby Township, Keene Township, Lyons Township, North Plains Township, Odessa Township, Orange Township, Portland, Portland Township, Ronald Township, Sebewa Township))
Party	Candidate	Votes	%
Republican	Mike Callton (incumbent)	26,454	61.63
Democratic	Sherry Anderson	14,937	34.80
Libertarian	Joseph Gillotte	1,533	3.57
Total votes		42,924	100.0
Republican hold			

88th District (Ottawa (Allendale Township, Chester Township, Coopersville, Georgetown Township, Polkton Township, Tallmadge Township, Wright Township))
Party	Candidate	Votes	%
Republican	Roger Victory	32,053	86.87
Libertarian	Michael Perry	4,843	13.13
Total votes		36,896	100.0
Republican hold			

89th District (Ottawa (Blendon Township, Ferrysburg, Grand Haven, Grand Haven Township, Olive Township, Park Township, Port Sheldon Township, Robinson Township, Spring Lake Township))
Party	Candidate	Votes	%
Republican	Amanda Price (incumbent)	29,776	65.72
Democratic	Don Bergman	15,530	34.28
Total votes		45,306	100.0
Republican hold			

90th District (Ottawa (Holland -- part within county, Holland Township, Hudsonville, Jamestown Township, Zeeland, Zeeland Township))
Party	Candidate	Votes	%
Republican	Joseph Haveman (incumbent)	31,592	100
Total votes		31,592	100.0
Republican hold			

91st District (Muskegon (Blue Lake Township, Casnovia Township, Cedar Creek Township, Dalton Township, Egelston Township, Fruitport Township, Holton Township, Montague, Montague Township, Moorland Township, Norton Shores, Ravenna Township, Roosevelt Park, Sullivan Town
Party	Candidate	Votes	%
Democratic	Collene Lamonte	19,257	48.10
Republican	Holly Hughes (incumbent)	18,924	47.27
Libertarian	Nicholas Sundquist	1,856	4.63
Total votes		40,037	100.0
Democratic gain from Republican			

92nd District (Muskegon (Fruitland Township, Laketon Township, Muskegon Heights, Muskegon, Muskegon Township, North Muskegon, Whitehall Township))
Party	Candidate	Votes	%
Democratic	Marcia Hovey-Wright (incumbent)	21,244	73.10
Republican	Travis Shepherd	8,908	26.90
Total votes		30,152	100.0
Democratic hold			

93rd District (Clinton, Gratiot (all except Alma, Bethany Township, Emerson Township, Pine River Township, Seville Township, St. Louis))
Party	Candidate	Votes	%
Republican	Tom Leonard	25,283	56.61
Democratic	Paul Silva	19,377	43.39
Total votes		44,660	100.0
Republican hold			

94th District (Saginaw (Albee Township, Birch Run Township, Blumfield Township, Frankenmuth, Frankenmuth Township, Saginaw Township, St. Charles Township, Swan Creek Township, Taymouth Township, Thomas Township, Tittabawassee Township))
Party	Candidate	Votes	%
Republican	Tim Kelly	26,256	56.00
Democratic	Judith Lincoln	20,630	44.00
Total votes		46,886	100.0
Republican hold			

95th District (Saginaw (Bridgeport Township, Buena Vista Township, Carrollton, James Township, Kochville Township, Saginaw, Spaulding Township, Zilwaukee, Zilwaukee Township))
Party	Candidate	Votes	%
Democratic	Stacy Erwin Oakes (incumbent)	27,778	77.95
Republican	Jeff Baker	7,859	22.05
Total votes		35,637	100.0
Democratic hold			

96th District (Bay (Bangor Township, Bay City, Essexville, Frankenlust Township, Hampton Township, Kawkawlin Township, Merritt Township, Monitor Township, Portsmouth Township))
Party	Candidate	Votes	%
Democratic	Charles Brunner (incumbent)	28,263	69.46
Republican	Chad Dewey	12,428	30.54
Total votes		40,691	100.0
Democratic hold			

97th District (Arenac, Clare, Gladwin, Osceola (Evart, Evart Township, Hersey Township, Highland Township, Marion Township, Middle Branch Township, Orient Township, Osceola Township, Sherman Township, Sylvan Township))
Party	Candidate	Votes	%
Republican	Joel Johnson (incumbent)	23,295	61.82
Democratic	Chris Breznau	14,387	38.18
Total votes		37,682	100.0
Republican hold			

98th District (Bay (Auburn, Beaver Township, Fraser Township, Garfield Township, Gibson Township, Midland -- portion within county, Mount Forest Township, Pinconning, Pinconning Township, Williams Township), Midland (Homer Township, Jerome Township, Larkin Township, Le
Party	Candidate	Votes	%
Republican	Jim Stamas (incumbent)	25,003	58.89
Democratic	Joan Brausch	17,453	41.11
Total votes		42,456	100.0
Republican hold			

99th District (Isabella, Midland (Coleman, Edenville Township, Geneva Township, Greendale Township, Hope Township, Ingersoll Township, Jasper Township, Mills Township, Mount Haley Township, Porter Township, Warren Township))
Party	Candidate	Votes	%
Republican	Kevin Cotter (incumbent)	18,150	57.40
Democratic	Adam Lawrence	13,468	42.60
Total votes		31,618	100.0
Republican hold			

100th District (Lake, Newaygo, Oceana)
Party	Candidate	Votes	%
Republican	Jon Bumstead (incumbent)	22,752	62.25
Democratic	Ida DeHaas	13,800	37.75
Total votes		36,552	100.0
Republican hold			

101st District (Benzie, Leelanau, Manistee, Mason)
Party	Candidate	Votes	%
Republican	Ray Franz (incumbent)	25,198	51.04
Democratic	Allen O'Shea	24,175	48.96
Total votes		49,373	100.0
Republican hold			

102nd District (Mecosta, Osceola (Burdell Township, Cedar Township, Hartwick Township, Leroy Township, Lincoln Township, Reed City, Richmond Township, Rose Lake Township), Wexford)
Party	Candidate	Votes	%
Republican	Philip Potvin (incumbent)	19.281	54.78
Democratic	Brendan Maturen	15,916	45.22
Total votes		35,197	100.0
Republican hold			

103rd District (Crawford, Kalkaska, Missaukee, Ogemaw, Roscommon)
Party	Candidate	Votes	%
Republican	Bruce Rendon (incumbent)	23,308	52.80
Democratic	Lon Johnson	20,832	47.20
Total votes		44,140	100.0
Republican hold			

104th District (Grand Traverse)
Party	Candidate	Votes	%
Republican	Wayne Schmidt (incumbent)	26,042	56.50
Democratic	Betsy Coffia	20,049	43.50
Total votes		46,091	100.0
Republican hold			

105th District (Antrim, Charlevoix, Montmorency, Oscoda, Otsego)
Party	Candidate	Votes	%
Republican	Greg MacMaster (incumbent)	30,725	66.74
Democratic	William Wieske	15,312	33.26
Total votes		46,037	100.0
Republican hold			

106th District (Alcona, Alpena, Cheboygan (Aloha Township, Benton Township, Burt Township, Ellis Township, Forest Township, Grant Township, Inverness Township, Mentor Township, Mullett Township, Nunda Township, Walker Township, Waverly Township, Wilmot Township), Crawfo
Party	Candidate	Votes	%
Republican	Peter Pettalia (incumbent)	24,522	52.22
Democratic	Kenneth Hubbard	21,261	45.27
Green	John Longhurst	1,178	2.51
Total votes		46,961	100.0
Republican hold			

107th District (Cheboygan (Beaugrand Township, Cheboygan, Hebron Township, Koehler Township, Mackinaw Township, Munro Township, Tuscarora Township), Chippewa, Emmet, Mackinac)
Party	Candidate	Votes	%
Republican	Frank Foster (incumbent)	25,301	58.03
Democratic	Suzanne Shumway	18,301	41.97
Total votes		43,602	100.0
Republican hold			

108th District (Delta, Dickinson, Menominee)
Party	Candidate	Votes	%
Republican	Ed McBroom (incumbent)	22,396	54.56
Democratic	Sharon Gray	18,653	45.44
Total votes		41,049	100.0
Republican hold			

109th District (Alger, Luce, Marquette (excluding Powell Township, Ishpeming Township), Schoolcraft)
Party	Candidate	Votes	%
Democratic	John Kivela	23,350	58.37
Republican	Jack Hubbard	16,655	41.63
Total votes		40,005	100.0
Democratic hold			

110th District (Baraga, Gogebic, Houghton, Iron, Keweenaw, Marquette (Ishpeming Township, Powell Township), Ontonagon)
Party	Candidate	Votes	%
Democratic	Scott Dianda	19,992	51.59
Republican	Matt Huuki (incumbent)	18,759	48.41
Total votes		38,751	100.0
Democratic gain from Republican			

=== Special elections ===
49th District special general election (November 5, 2013)
Party	Candidate	Votes	%
Democratic	Phil Phelps	4,894	63.41
Republican	Don Pfeiffer	2,501	32.40
Libertarian	Pat Clawson	323	4.19
Total votes		7,718	100.00
Democratic hold			
