= Vagnozzi =

Vagnozzi is a surname of Italian origin. Notable people with the surname include:

- Aldo Vagnozzi (born 1925), Italian-American politician
- Antonio Vagnozzi (contemporary), Italian astronomer
- Egidio Vagnozzi (1906–1980), Italian Roman Catholic cardinal
- Simone Vagnozzi (born 1983), Italian tennis player
