= 2016 Oakland County Executive election =

- November 8, 2016

Nominee	L. Brooks Patterson	Vicki Barnett
Party	Republican	Democratic
Popular vote	340,579	293,303
Percentage	53.50%	46.08%
Oakland County Executive before election
L. Brooks Patterson
Republican
Elected Oakland County Executive
L. Brooks Patterson
Republican

The 2016 Oakland County Executive election was held on November 8, 2016. Incumbent County Executive L. Brooks Patterson ran for re-election to a seventh term. Former State Representative Vicki Barnett won the Democratic primary and opposed Patterson in the general election. Patterson defeated Barnett with 54 percent of the vote, a significantly narrower margin than his past victories.

== Democratic primary ==
=== Candidates ===
- Vicki Barnett, former State Representative
- Mark Danowski, 2012 Democratic candidate for Oakland County Water Resources Commissioner

=== Results ===
Democratic primary results
Party	Candidate	Votes	%
Democratic	Vicki Barnett	53,021	78.26%
Democratic	Mark Danowski	14,558	21.49%
Democratic	Write-ins	171	0.25%
Total votes		67,750	100.00%

== Republican primary ==
=== Candidates ===
- L. Brooks Patterson, incumbent County Executive

=== Results ===
Republican primary results
Party	Candidate	Votes	%
Republican	L. Brooks Patterson (inc.)	86,460	99.56%
Republican	Write-ins	380	0.44%
Total votes		86,840	100.00%

== General election ==
=== Results ===
2016 Oakland County Executive election
Party	Candidate	Votes	%
Republican	L. Brooks Patterson (inc.)	340,579	53.50%
Democratic	Vicki Barnett	293,303	46.08%
Write-in		2,677	0.42%
Total votes		636,559	100.00%
Republican hold			
