= Rocky Raczkowski =

American politician

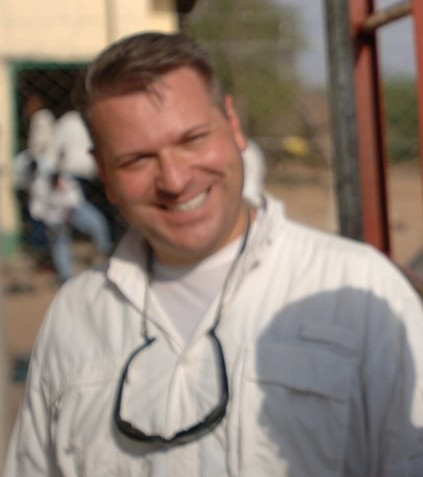

Member of the Michigan House of Representatives from the 37th district
- In office January 1, 1997 – December 31, 2002
- Preceded by: Jan C. Dolan
- Succeeded by: Aldo Vagnozzi

Personal details
- Born: Andrew Raczkowski; December 29, 1968 (age 57) Detroit, Michigan, U.S.
- Party: Republican
- Spouse: Amalia Kaddo
- Education: Eastern Michigan University (BA); Central Michigan University (MA); Michigan State University (JD); United States Army Command and General Staff College (MS)

Andrew "Rocky" Raczkowski (born December 29, 1968) is an American politician from Michigan who was the 2010 Republican nominee for Michigan's 9th congressional district.

== Early life, education and career ==
A resident of Troy, he is a retired lieutenant colonel with the U.S. Army Reserves. He served as the Chief Executive of Star Tickets Plus from 2007-2010 Raczkowski endorsed Rick Perry for the 2012 republican primary, and co chaired several events for his election, after Perry withdrawal, Raczkowski endorsed Rick Santorum. In the 2016 primaries, Raczkowski endorsed Ted Cruz.

== Michigan House of Representatives ==
Raczkowski was a member of the Michigan House of Representatives from 1997 to 2003, representing the 37th District (Farmington and Farmington Hills). In 2002 he was term-limited, as Michigan House members cannot serve more than three two-year terms. Described as a "militant, law-and-order Republican", Raczkowski was known for his extreme stances against marijuana, public transit, and Detroit which has attracted controversy from both sides.

== Political campaigns ==
=== 2002 U.S. Senate campaign ===
Raczkowski won the Republican nomination for the United States Senate, but lost to the popular longtime Democratic incumbent Carl Levin by 60.6% to 37.9%.

=== 2008 U.S. Senate campaign ===
Raczkowski was planning on running in the Republican primary to challenge Levin again, but when he was called up for active duty, he was forced to drop out of the race.

=== 2010 U.S. congressional campaign ===
Raczkowski challenged Democratic incumbent Gary Peters (who would later be elected Levin's successor in the Senate in 2014 upon his retirement) for Michigan's 9th congressional district, losing in the general election with 47% of the vote to Peters' 49% of the vote. Raczkowski won the Republican primary on August 3, 2010. Raczkowski was dogged by advertisements revealing a civil action against him, in the United States District Court of South Dakota, for fraud, theft, and breach of contract by a concert promoter (case dismissed). Raczkowski's own lawsuit, alleging defamation in the advertisements, was thrown out in January 2011. Raczkowski's fraud trial was scheduled to begin on October 15, 2013 (dismissed).

Party political offices
Preceded by Ronna Romney	Republican nominee for U.S. Senator from Michigan (Class 2); 2002	Succeeded by Jack Hoogendyk
