= Christine Greig =

American politician (born 1963)

Minority Leader of the Michigan House of Representatives
- In office January 9, 2019 – January 13, 2021
- Preceded by: Sam Singh
- Succeeded by: Donna Lasinski

Member of the Michigan House of Representatives from the 37th district
- In office January 1, 2015 – January 13, 2021
- Preceded by: Vicki Barnett
- Succeeded by: Samantha Steckloff

Personal details
- Born: January 11, 1963 (age 63) Plymouth, Indiana, U.S.
- Party: Democratic
- Education: University of Notre Dame (BA)

Christine E. Greig (born January 11, 1963) is a former Democratic politician from Michigan, who represented the 37th District which comprises Farmington and Farmington Hills in the Michigan House of Representatives. In her second term, Greig also served as the Minority Floor Leader, and she served as Democratic Leader in her third term. Prior to her election to the Michigan Legislature, Greig served as the executive director of the Farmington/Farmington Hills Education Foundation.

== History ==
=== Personal biography ===
Christine Jeffirs Greig was born on January 11, 1963, and grew up in Plymouth, Indiana. She graduated as salutatorian and student body president from Plymouth High School in 1981 and went on to earn a bachelor's degree in American Studies and Computer Applications from the University of Notre Dame. She was named a Notre Dame Scholar, placing her in the top 20% of incoming Notre Dame students.

She has three sons and resides in Farmington Hills, Mi.

=== Professional life ===
After her education, Greig worked for Andersen Consulting as an application software expert, and would later work for Kmart Corporation, managing the implementation of their human resource systems. In 1994, she became the co-owner of Fulcrum Computer Services, based in Farmington Hills.

Prior to her election into office, Greig founded and directed the Farmington/Farmington Hills Education Foundation, a non-profit organization focused on providing support for the students of Farmington and Farmington Hills public schools.

=== Political career ===
Greig was elected to serve the 37th District in the Michigan House of Representatives in November 2014 In her first term in the Michigan House, Christine Greig served on the committees of Communications and Technology, Education, and Workforce and Talent Development. She was appointed Assistant Floor Leader and served as the Vice Chair of the Progressive Women's Caucus. She was also selected to participate in the 2015 Bowhay Institute Legislative Leadership Development (BILLD) program, a fellowship program sponsored by the Council of State Governments Midwest. In her second term, she was elected Minority Floor Leader. In her final term, she served as the House Democratic Leader of the 52 member democratic caucus, only the second woman to lead a House caucus.

==== 2014 election ====
On August 5, 2014, Greig defeated Barry Brickner and Theresa Rich in the Democratic Primary for the 37th district for the Michigan House of Representatives. She then defeated Republican Party candidate Richard Learner in the general election on November 4, 2014.

2014 Michigan House of Representatives, District 37
Party	Candidate	Votes	%
Democratic	Christine Greig	19,148	57.1
Republican	Richard Learner	14,359	42.9
Majority		4,789	14.3
Total votes		33,507	100
Democratic hold			

Democratic Primary – 2014 Michigan House of Representatives, District 35
Party	Candidate	Votes	%
Democratic	Christine Greig	3,288	39.8
Democratic	Barry Brickner	2,729	33.0
Democratic	Theresa Rich	2,244	27.2
Total votes		8,261	100

==== 2016 election ====
Christine Greig ran unopposed in the Democratic Primary for the 37th district for the Michigan House of Representatives. She defeated both Republican Party candidate Mitch Swoboda and Libertarian Party candidate James Young. In her second term in the Michigan House, Christine Greig was elected by her democratic colleagues to serve as the Minority Floor Leader. She was a member of Legislative Council, Government Operations, and the House Fiscal Agency Governing committees.

2016 Michigan House of Representatives, District 37
Party	Candidate	Votes	%
Democratic	Christine Greig	29,181	60.63
Republican	Mitch Swoboda	17,209	35.75
Libertarian	James Young	1,743	3.62
Majority		11,972	24.87
Total votes		48,133	100
Democratic hold			

==== 2018 election ====
Once again, Christine Greig ran unopposed in the Democratic Primary for the 37th district for the Michigan House of Representatives. She defeated Republican Party candidate Mitch Swodoba in the general election. In her third term, Representative Greig was elected by the House Democrats to serve as House Democratic Leader.

2018 Michigan House of Representatives, District 37
Party	Candidate	Votes	%
Democratic	Christine Greig	28,702	67.20
Republican	Mitch Swoboda	14,012	32.80
Majority		14,690	34.39
Total votes		42,714	100
Democratic hold			

== Other work ==
Greig currently serves on the Board of Advisors of Let America Vote, an organization founded by former Missouri Secretary of State Jason Kander that aims to end voter suppression.

Michigan House of Representatives
Preceded by Sam Singh	Minority Leader of the Michigan House of Representatives; 2019–2021	Succeeded by Donna Lasinski
