= Patrick Miles Jr. =

American politician (born 1967)

Patrick A. Miles Jr.
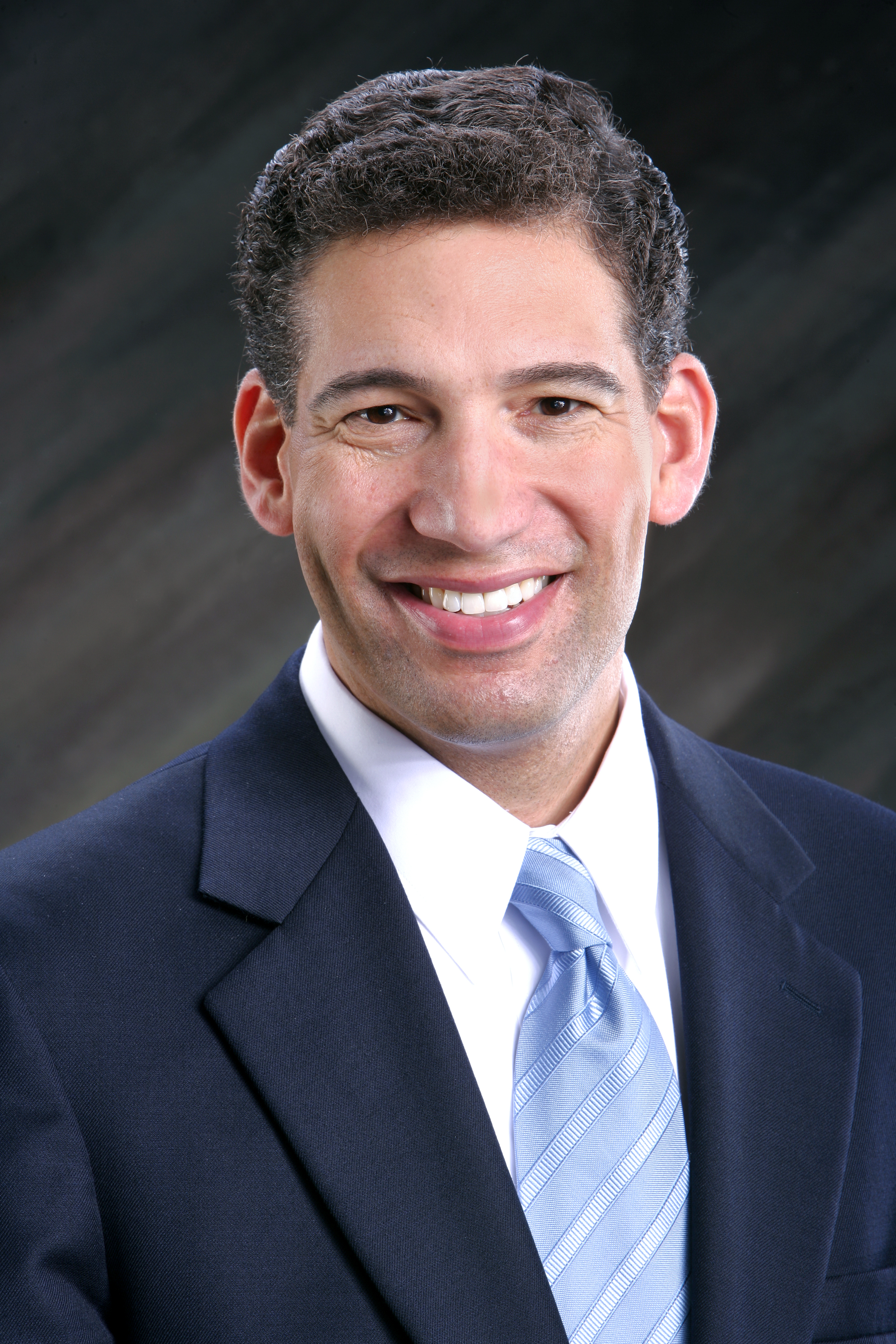
- Miles in 2010

United States Attorney for the Western District of Michigan
- In office July 9, 2012 – January 20, 2017
- Appointed by: Barack Obama
- Preceded by: Donald A. Davis
- Succeeded by: Andrew B. Birge

Personal details
- Born: October 19, 1967 (age 59) Grand Rapids, Michigan, U.S.
- Party: Democratic
- Education: Aquinas College (BA); Harvard University (JD)
- Occupation: Attorney

Patrick A. Miles Jr. (born October 19, 1967) is an American lawyer. He was the former U.S. Attorney for the Western District of Michigan based in Grand Rapids, Michigan. He was nominated by President Obama on March 29, 2012, and confirmed by the U.S. Senate on June 29, 2012. Miles is the first person of color to hold the position of U.S. Attorney for the Western District of Michigan, which covers 49 Michigan counties including the state's entire Upper Peninsula.

He was the Democratic nominee for Michigan's 3rd Congressional District in the 2010 congressional election.

== Background and education ==
Miles is a third-generation resident of southeast Grand Rapids. He is the son of Patrick A. Miles Sr., a retired Steelcase Senior Buyer, former chairman of the Grand Rapids Urban League board of directors and former chairman of the Grand Rapids Planning Commission, and Shirley Cross Miles, who retired after teaching early elementary students in the Grand Rapids Public Schools for 30 years.

His mother is a descendant of freed slave Thomas W. Cross, was reared on a family farm in Blanchard, Michigan and is related to Merze Tate, the first African American woman to attend the University of Oxford and to earn a Ph.D. in government and international relations from Radcliffe College. His sister, Angela Miles, is a television anchor/reporter based in Chicago, Illinois. Miles' paternal grandfather worked in Grand Rapids for General Motors as a machinist.

Miles attended Grand Rapids public schools and graduated from Ottawa Hills High School at the age of 16. Miles spent his freshman year of college at Great Lakes Christian College (then Great Lakes Bible College) in Lansing, Michigan, before graduating from Aquinas College in 1988 with a degree in business administration and economics. He worked in an office furniture factory as a spot-welder all four summers during college.

Miles graduated from Harvard Law School at age 23 and was a member of its Class of 1991 along with former U.S. President Barack Obama, U.S. Supreme Court Justice Neil Gorsuch, former Georgia Supreme Court Justice David Nahmias, former FCC Chairman Julius Genachowski, and former White House Political Director and former R.N.C. Chair Kenneth Mehlman. While at Harvard, he became editor-in-chief of the Harvard Law Record, the first African American to do so.

== Professional career ==
After Harvard, Miles returned home to Grand Rapids in 1991 and joined Varnum Riddering Schmidt & Howlett, a 150-attorney law firm, as an associate. He specialized in business law and cable/telecommunications law. Miles made partner in 1997 at the age of 29—the first person of color to become a partner in the firm's 110-year history and the first African American male to become a partner at a Grand Rapids law firm with more than 10 attorneys.

Miles served an elected term on the Varnum management/policy committee from January 1, 2002, to December 31, 2004. In 2006 he joined the national law firm of Dickinson Wright as a partner based in Grand Rapids.

In 2002, he was elected to serve as President of the Grand Rapids Bar Association from 2004 to 2005. Miles has served on dozens of community boards and committees. He served on the Aquinas College Board of Trustees from 1993 to 2012 and was its chairman from 2004 to 2008, guiding the Board through a presidential search process and governance reorganization. He serves on the DeVos Children's Hospital Foundation Board, and is its former vice chair.

In the late 1990s, he chaired the Inner-City Christian Federation Board of Directors, a faith-based non-profit which builds and creates affordable housing ownership opportunities. He was Secretary and Treasurer of Hope Network, Treasurer of Spectrum Health Hospitals, and was on the Greater Grand Rapids Area YMCA Board of Directors and is its former Treasurer. In July 2011 he was elected to serve as the first president of the newly formed Grand Rapids Black Chamber of Commerce—the first to be locally chartered by the Michigan Black Chamber of Commerce.

The Grand Rapids Business Journal named Miles to its 40 under 40 business leaders list in October 1998, December 2002, and November 2007. Business Direct Weekly named him to its 40 business leaders under 40 in March 2004. In 1999, the Grand Rapids Press named Pat Miles one of 10 corporate leaders to watch in the new millennium.

On July 9, 2012, Miles began serving as the United States Attorney for the Western District of Michigan. As U.S. Attorney Miles supported improving law enforcement and community relations in the cities of Battle Creek, Benton Harbor, Grand Rapids, Holland, Kalamazoo, Lansing, and Muskegon. He also initiated several programs, including violent crime prevention coordination in several cities, a program to reduce recidivism by assisting returning citizens in finding employment and social services, and a program for middle school students called "Justice Scholars" to learn about the legal system. In addition, his office obtained the first federal sex trafficking conviction in Western Michigan and led efforts to fight the opioid epidemic. He oversaw the federal investigation and child pornography case of sex offender Larry Nassar that led to Nassar's federal criminal conviction in 2017.

Miles announced his resignation as United States Attorney for the Western District of Michigan on January 5, 2017, which took effect on January 20, 2017.

On May 1, 2017, Miles joined Barnes & Thornburg LLP in Grand Rapids. Miles focuses his practice on business counseling and transactions, white collar cases, internal investigations, corporate compliance, and monitorships. In May 2023 Miles was a commencement speaker for Saginaw Valley State University and awarded an Honorary Doctor of Humanities degree.

== Campaigns ==
Miles announced on March 18, 2010, that he was running for Congress to represent Michigan's Third Congressional District—an area Gerald Ford represented for 24 years and which had not elected a Democrat to Congress since 1974. He won the August 3rd Democratic primary against former Kent County Commissioner Paul Mayhue by a 2–1 margin.

Miles ran on a campaign theme of "working together to get results" and received some national attention. He offered specific policy proposals to help small and emerging business job creation, improve education, make college affordable, and reduce the federal budget deficit. He proposed a five percent pay cut for members of Congress each year the federal budget is not balanced.

Miles' campaign attracted attention from local and statewide media for endorsements from more than 100 self-proclaimed Republicans, including three former Kent County Republican Party Chairs; Heidi Ehlers Rienstra and Marla Ehlers, daughters of retiring Congressman Vern Ehlers (R-MI3); Karen Henry Stokes, widow of Republican Congressman Paul B. Henry, as well as several former Michigan Republican state representatives.

In the November 2, 2010 general election, Miles was defeated by Republican Justin Amash.

On December 1, 2010, Miles returned to practice law at Dickinson Wright in Grand Rapids until he took office as the Grand Rapids-based U.S. Attorney.

== Run for Attorney General ==
On September 28, 2017, Miles announced he was seeking the Democratic nomination for Michigan Attorney General. On April 15, 2018, Miles was unable to secure the Democratic nomination for this office, losing to Dana Nessel at the Michigan Democratic Party endorsement convention.

Legal offices
Preceded by Donald A. Davis	United States Attorney for the Western District of Michigan; 2012–2017	Succeeded by Andrew B. Birge (Acting)
