= Tom Leonard (Michigan politician) =

American politician (born 1981)

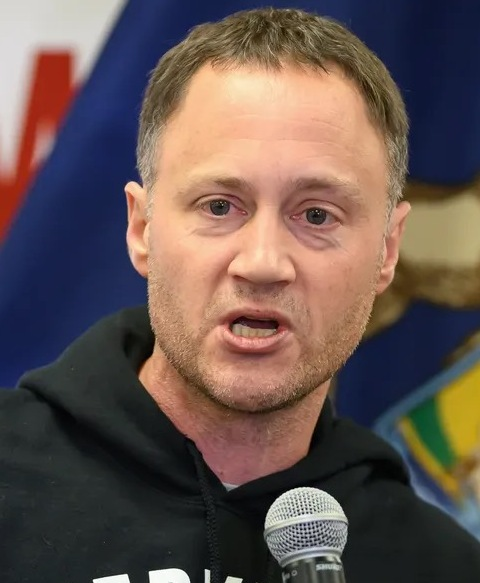

73rd Speaker of the Michigan House of Representatives
- In office January 11, 2017 – January 9, 2019
- Preceded by: Kevin Cotter
- Succeeded by: Lee Chatfield

Speaker pro tempore of the Michigan House of Representatives
- In office January 14, 2015 – January 11, 2017
- Preceded by: John J. Walsh
- Succeeded by: Lee Chatfield

Member of the Michigan House of Representatives from the 93rd district
- In office January 1, 2013 – January 1, 2019
- Preceded by: Paul Opsommer
- Succeeded by: Graham Filler

Personal details
- Born: Thomas L. Leonard III; April 20, 1981 (age 45)
- Party: Republican
- Education: University of Michigan (BA); Michigan State University (JD)

Thomas L. Leonard III (born April 20, 1981) is an American attorney and politician. He is a former member of the Michigan House of Representatives who served as Speaker of the House from 2017 to 2019. Elected in 2012 to succeed term-limited Paul Opsommer, Leonard represented the residents of Clinton and Gratiot County. Prior to that, he worked as a prosecutor. Leonard unsuccessfully ran for Michigan Attorney General in 2018 and was nominated by President Donald Trump to be the United States Attorney for the Western District of Michigan.

== Early life and education ==
Leonard has a bachelor's degree in history and Spanish from the University of Michigan. Leonard received his Juris Doctor from Michigan State University College of Law.

Leonard worked in the Genesee County Prosecutor's Office under longtime Democratic prosecutor David Leyton. Leonard became an assistant attorney general for the State of Michigan, working under former Attorney General Mike Cox.

== Michigan House of Representatives ==
=== Elections ===
Leonard announced on August 11, 2011, that would run for state representative in Michigan's 93rd District. Leonard planned to embody "principled, conservative leadership in the State House" and on bringing his experience as a former prosecutor to stand up for the citizens of Michigan. Leonard received some prominent endorsements in the primary, including Senator Alan Cropsey, Clinton County Sheriff Wayne Kangas, and the Detroit Regional Chamber of Commerce. He narrowly won the Republican primary against Clinton County farmer Kevin Kirk by 204 votes. Leonard went on to win the 2012 November general election with 56.6% of the vote and assumed office in January 2013.

Leonard was re-elected to his seat twice, defeating Josh Derke by over 20% in 2014 and almost 30% in 2016.

=== Tenure ===
In 2012, Leonard left the attorney general's office to serve as state representative. During his first term in office, Leonard was elected to the House Leadership team as Majority Caucus Vice-chair. After serving as the ranking vice-chair of the Insurance Committee, Leonard was selected as chair of the House Insurance Committee in his second term. Leonard was also chosen by his Republican colleagues in 2014 to serve as second-in-line in House leadership as the Speaker Pro Tempore, a position which allowed him to preside over the House as Speaker during the absence of the Speaker of the House.

In September 2013, Leonard was selected as one of the American Conservative Union's "10 under 40" rising conservative leaders from across the country.

Leonard is a Concealed Pistol License (CPL) holder and a Lifetime member of the National Rifle Association of America (NRA). He has maintained an "A+" rating with the Michigan Coalition for Responsible Gun Owners ("MCRGO"-PAC) and an "A" rating from the NRA Political Victory Fund. In Leonard's first term, he co-sponsored legislation that protects law-abiding citizens' CPL information from the Freedom of Information Act (FOIA).

Leonard is a member of the DeWitt Lions Club and the Clinton County Farm Bureau. He is also the former chairman of the DeWitt Public Safety Committee and an active member of the St. Johns Kiwanis Club. Leonard and his wife Jenell, who serves as the director of the Michigan Film and Digital Media Office, live in DeWitt Charter Township with their daughter, Hannah.

=== Speaker of the House ===
In November 2016, Leonard was selected by the House Republican Caucus to serve as Speaker of the Michigan House of Representatives, succeeding term-limited Speaker Kevin Cotter. In January 2017, Leonard was formally elected Speaker of the House by a unanimous bipartisan vote of the entire Michigan House of Representatives. Leonard was the 2018 Republican nominee for Michigan Attorney General. He was narrowly defeated by Democrat Dana Nessel.

== Political positions ==
Immediately after securing support among his Republican colleagues to be the next Speaker of the House, Leonard laid out three top priorities for his final term in the Legislature. His three priorities were mental health reform, expanding skilled trades education in Michigan schools, and reforming the state's underwater teacher pension fund.

=== Michigan State University ===
Upset with Michigan State University's handling of the Larry Nassar sexual abuse scandal, Leonard became the first public official to call for the resignation of then-MSU President Lou Anna K. Simon. Leonard faced immediate backlash for the decision from political opponents. However, after another month and a half of embarrassing information becoming public, the full state House voted 96–11 in favor of a resolution demanding the president's resignation. Simon resigned hours later.

Leonard then called for the school's board of trustees to resign, allowing the governor to appoint replacements. Inaction on forcing changes from President Simon and controversial and dismissive statements toward the victims of abuse from members of the Board drove the decision.

Citing frustration from the victims at the lack of disclosure from Michigan State University and a need to find points of failure to inform the policy-making process, Leonard directed two of his committee chairs to launch a legislative inquiry into the situation. In January 2018, those committee chairs requested several previously unavailable records from the school. If the university refused, the committees threatened to utilize subpoena powers to compel the university to cooperate.

That inquiry led to thousands of pages of records being turned over to the Legislature. Those records revealed new, previously undiscovered criminal activity the Legislature turned over to the attorney general.

=== Mental health reform ===
As the chairman of the House Insurance Committee, Leonard focused on reforming auto insurance to reduce rates for drivers and reforming the state's mental health system. Specifically, he led an effort to reform a state program, known as Kevin's Law, which allowed concerned family members to get critical help for those suffering from mental illness before a crime was committed.

Leonard began his legal career as a clerk for Genesee County's chief probate judge, Jennie Barkey. Judge Barkey created Michigan's first mental health treatment court, a diversionary program intended to keep people with mental illnesses out of the criminal justice system and focus the mental health system more on prevention than on punishment. Tom Leonard initially opposed the move, but now says he is “proud to say that [he] was wrong,” and that it was the right idea. The successful court has been copied into other counties, and it recently celebrated its tenth anniversary, with Leonard helping to mark the occasion.

After being elected Speaker, Leonard highlighted mental illness as a top priority for the House during his term, specifically promoting early intervention efforts like he those he saw first-hand in Genesee County. Leonard created a bipartisan task force to travel around the state listening to testimony on various issues with the state's mental health system and collecting potential legislative reforms to address the situation. The task force completed its tour in late 2017 presented its findings in a public report and began drafting legislation in January 2018. Dozens of those recommendations have since been passed by the state House.

=== Tax relief ===
The first bill introduced in the Michigan House under Leonard was House Bill 4001, a measure to reduce the state income tax. The income tax had been raised under then-Gov. Jennifer Granholm in 2009 while the state struggled with a budget shortfall. The rate increase was intended to be temporary, but it never came back down to the original level.

Leonard pushed to reduce the tax back to 3.9%, but ultimately fell three votes short in a late-night session at the state Capitol. Republican governor Rick Snyder opposed the move.

Following the federal tax reform effort, House leadership introduced a new plan to cut taxes for Michigan workers, increasing the personal exemption and giving a special credit to senior citizens. The tax cut passed with a large, bipartisan majority on January 25, 2018.

=== Transparency and ethics ===
In early 2017, the Michigan House introduced, debated and unanimously passed a series of reforms to expand the state's Freedom of Information Act and open the state Legislature to open records requests for the first time. Leonard pushed for the plan opening his own chamber and the governor's office to the public, including hosting a large, bipartisan public announcement of the bill in the Capitol building. However, opposition from the Senate and the governor's refusal to sign it ended the plan.

=== Auto insurance ===
Citing the highest auto insurance rates in the nation, Leonard teamed up with Detroit's Democratic mayor Mike Duggan to propose reform's to Michigan's current no-fault auto insurance system. The proposed bill would have introduced more options for drivers in their auto coverage and would have saved drivers up to 50% on their monthly bills. The legislation did not pass after failing to garner sufficient support to pass.

=== Driver responsibility fees ===
In 2018, Leonard proposed repealing Michigan's driver responsibility fees, which were additional surcharges assessed on top of tickets from driving infractions instituted during the state's mid-2000s budget crisis. Leonard also wanted to forgive the outstanding fines assessed to Michigan drivers under the program. Many drivers who incurred the fees and were unable to afford them incurred additional fines for nonpayment and fell further in debt, eventually losing their licenses. By 2017, more than 350,000 residents had lost their licenses due to nonpayment and the additional fines, and 300,000 owed back payments to the state for previous fees. With the program under growing criticism and thousands losing their licenses weekly, legislators who passed the program into law began to call for its repeal.

Gov. Rick Snyder had signed a bill phasing out the program after 5 years in 2014, but Leonard wanted an immediate end to the fees and a complete forgiveness of past fines. After a long standoff, Gov. Snyder backed down and agreed to Leonard's plan in early 2018. House Bill 5040, which immediately repealed the driver responsibility fee program and fully forgave the outstanding debts, was passed by the House in early 2018 and later signed into law. Because of this plan, on October 1, 2018, the 350,000 Michigan drivers who lost their licenses because of the program will be able to reapply and regain their ability to drive legally.

=== Criminal justice reform ===
The first bills signed into law in Michigan in 2017 were a package of bills to reform the state's prison system and reduce recidivism. A similar package of bills had failed during the previous term.

Leonard also supported an effort to reform civil asset forfeiture, a practice he said “opens the door for abuse.” Efforts to reform civil asset forfeiture had been smaller and more incremental in recent years, but the version Leonard pushed through required a conviction for the first time. The Detroit News called the bill an “important” reform.

=== Marijuana legalization ===
After U.S. Attorney General Jeff Sessions moved to prosecute medical marijuana patients nationwide, Leonard said his fellow Republican, Sessions, should "back off." Leonard called marijuana a states' rights issue and emphasized that Michigan voters had already overwhelmingly voted in favor of legalizing medical marijuana.

Leonard does not personally support recreational marijuana. However, he has committed to doing everything he can as the state's attorney general to uphold marijuana legalization if the voters pass it into law.

=== Public school employee pensions ===
Before beginning his term as Speaker of the House, Leonard named reforming Michigan's teacher pension system as one of his top priorities for the coming year. Legislative leaders introduced the plan early in 2017 but were met with resistance from Gov. Rick Snyder. After a protracted standoff over the state budget, the governor relented and the pension reform passed into law. Legislative leaders had been trying to reform the system for years with no results until Leonard's plan succeeded.

=== Budget ===
Serving in House leadership every term in the state legislature, Leonard has been involved in annual budget negotiations. As the Speaker of the House, Leonard selected state Representative Laura Cox to be the chairwoman of the House Appropriations Committee. Cox is the first woman to ever hold the title. As speaker, Leonard named local schools, road repairs, mental health programming, and strengthening public safety as his top budget priorities. In both years of his term, those priorities all saw increased funding, even as overall spending was lowered. Local school funding and road repair funding were increased to all-time record high levels, $14.9 billion and more than $4 billion respectively.

Leonard also leveraged budget negotiations in both years to gain support for additional policy reforms. In 2017, Leonard secured reforms to Michigan's underfunded teacher pension system after a long standoff with the governor. Gov. Rick Snyder did not support that plan, but Leonard and his legislative partners eventually won a change described as the “most innovative teacher pension reform in the nation.”

In 2018, Leonard used the budget process to push for the repeal of driver responsibility fees and a reform package centered on new school safety initiatives. The repeal was signed into law, and the budget included $61 million in funding for school safety programs.

==== Additional road funding supplemental budget ====
Michigan had an unexpected $175m budget surplus at the end of 2017, and there was a general consensus among state leaders to use the funding on road repairs. This would have been in addition to the most recent state budget, which already includes more than $4b in road funding, an all-time high. Leonard found a way to spend the money faster and get it out into the roads one construction season earlier, fixing roads one year earlier than they would have been fixed otherwise. The governor agreed and signed the additional funding into law in March 2018.

=== Contraception and abortion ===
On February 18, 2022, Leonard expressed opposition to the decision in Griswold v. Connecticut, which protects the use of contraceptives for married couples. Leonard is opposed to the decision in Roe v. Wade, which protects a pregnant woman's choice on abortion.

=== 2020 election results ===
Leonard supports a "forensic audit" of the results of the 2020 United States presidential election in Michigan based on unproven claims of widespread voter fraud.

== 2018 Michigan Attorney General campaign ==
In October 2017, Tom Leonard announced his campaign to be Michigan's next attorney general. Leonard would be the first attorney general to have previous experience working in the office. Leonard named fighting violent crime, prosecuting sexual predators and putting a stop to the opioid epidemic as his top priorities. During the campaign, Leonard refused to say whether he would support lawsuits to overturn the Affordable Care Act. He has been endorsed by the Police Officers Association of Michigan. He narrowly lost the general election to Dana Nessel.

== United States Attorney nomination ==
On August 14, 2019, President Donald Trump announced his intent to nominate Tom Leonard to be the United States Attorney for the Western District of Michigan. On September 9, 2019, his nomination was sent to the Senate. In January 2020, Michigan's two Democratic senators blocked Leonard's nomination, which was returned to the president.

== Later career ==
In March 2020, Leonard joined the law firm Plunkett Cooney in Bloomfield Hills.

== Electoral history ==
2018 Michigan Attorney General election
Party	Candidate	Votes	%	±%
Democratic	Dana Nessel	2,021,797	49.01%	+4.82%
Republican	Tom Leonard	1,909,171	46.28%	−5.83%
Libertarian	Lisa Lane Giola	86,692	2.10%	+0.24%
Independent	Chris Graveline	69,707	1.69%	N/A
Constitution	Gerald Van Sickle	38,103	0.92%	−0.08%
Majority		112,626	2.73%	−5.19%
Turnout		4,125,470		+34.07%
Democratic gain from Republican		Swing		

Michigan House of Representatives
Preceded by John J. Walsh	Speaker pro tempore of the Michigan House of Representatives; 2015–2017	Succeeded by Lee Chatfield
Political offices
Preceded by Kevin Cotter	Speaker of the Michigan House of Representatives; 2017–2019	Succeeded by Lee Chatfield
Party political offices
Preceded by Bill Schuette	Republican nominee for Attorney General of Michigan; 2018	Succeeded by Matthew DePerno
