= Samantha Steckloff =

American politician (born 1984)

Member of the Michigan House of Representatives
- Incumbent
- Assumed office January 1, 2021
- Preceded by: Christine Greig
- Constituency: 37th district (2021–2023); 19th district (2023–present)

Personal details
- Born: c. 1984 (age 41–42) Farmington Hills, Michigan, U.S.
- Party: Democratic
- Education: Purdue University (BA)
- Website: Samantha Steckloff

Samantha Rae Steckloff (born 1984) is an American politician serving as a member of the Michigan House of Representatives since 2021, currently representing the 19th district. A member of the Democratic Party, Steckloff previously served on the Farmington Hills City Council from 2013 to 2021.

== Early life and education ==
Steckloff was born in 1984 to mother Vicki Barnett and attorney Irwin Steckloff, and raised in Farmington Hills, Michigan with her brother Jordan. In 2002 she graduated from her home city's Harrison High School. As a teenager, Steckloff got involved with community activism through the Farmington Hills After School program and as a charter member of the Mayor's Youth Council. In 2006, Steckloff earned a bachelor's degree in foreign policy from Purdue University. During her time at Purdue University, Steckloff became the Indiana Association of Cities and Towns' youngest youth coordinator.

== Career ==
Steckloff was first elected to the Farmington Hills City Council in 2013. During her time on the council, she successfully advocated for the creation of a city community health commission, the first of its kind in Michigan. On November 3, 2020, Steckloff was elected to the Michigan House of Representatives, where she has represented the 37th district since January 1, 2021. She resigned from the city council to serve in the state legislature.

In the Michigan House, Steckloff serves on the Appropriations Committee and is Vice-Chair of the Transportation Subcommittee. She also is a member of the Joint Capital Outlay and Licensing & Regulatory Affairs/Insurance & Financial Services Subcommittee of the Appropriations Committee.

Following redistricting, she ran in the 19th district in 2022, winning reelection. She was reelected in 2024.

== Personal life ==
In 2015, Steckloff was diagnosed with invasive ductal carcinoma, the most common form of breast cancer. Due to the diagnosis, Steckloff experienced bouts of depression and suicidal thoughts. Her experiences were featured in the 2016 Public Broadcasting Service documentary Death Is Not the Answer. In September 2020, Steckloff married Brandon Sundheimer. Steckloff is Jewish.
