= 2018 Michigan Attorney General election =

2018 Michigan Attorney General Election
- November 6, 2018
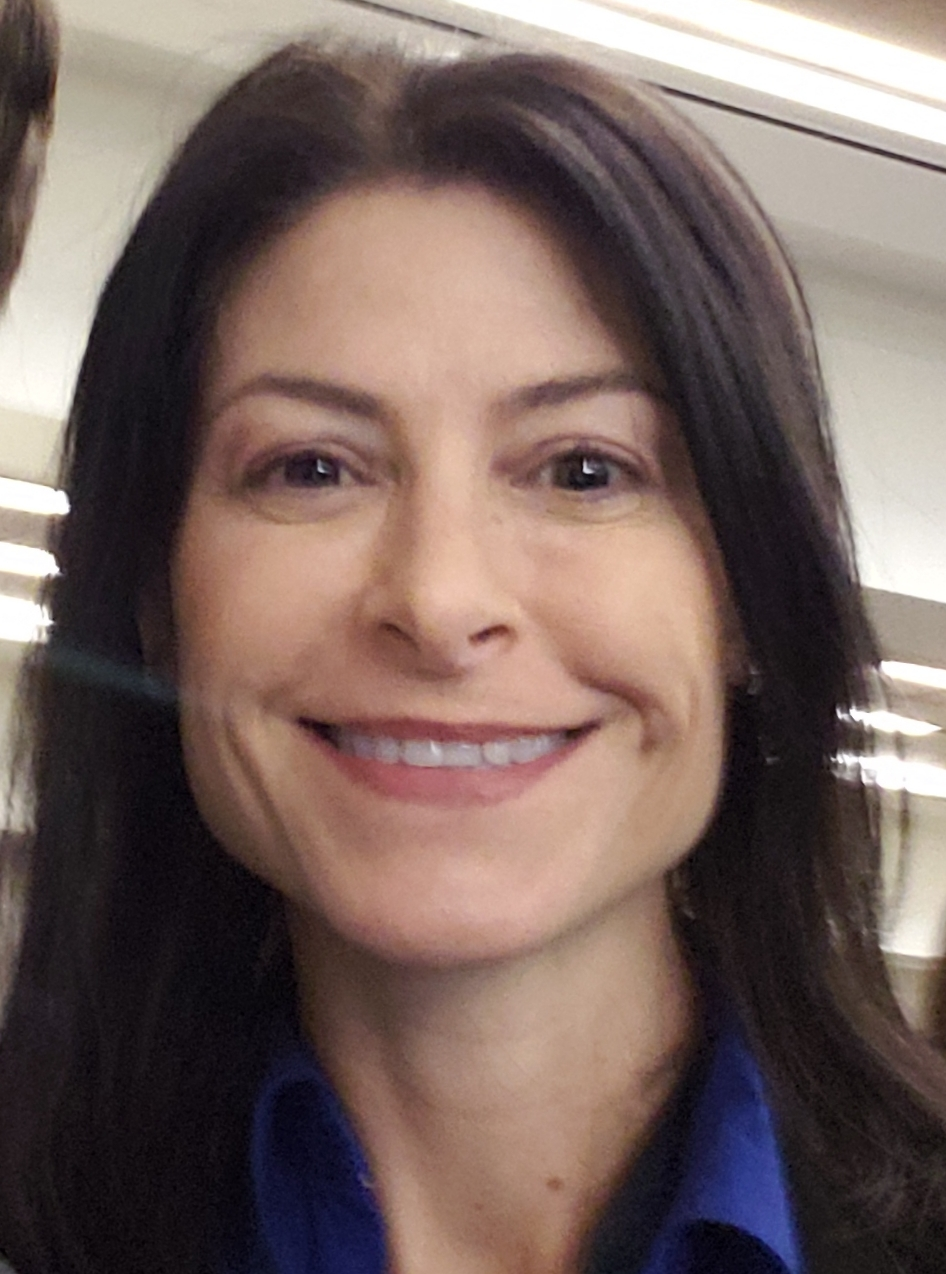

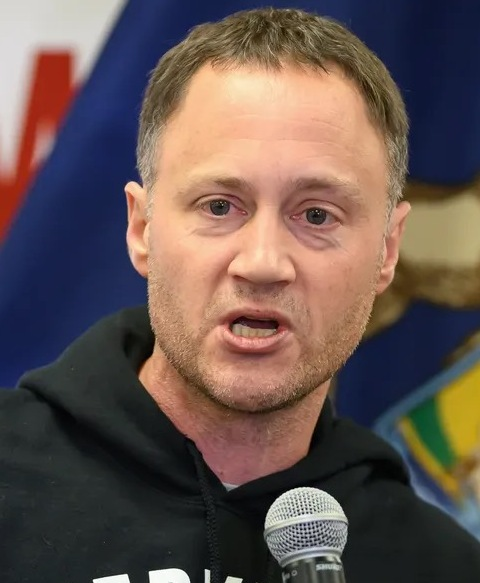
Nominee	Dana Nessel	Tom Leonard
Party	Democratic	Republican
Popular vote	2,031,117	1,916,117
Percentage	49.04%	46.26%
- Nessel: 40–50% 50–60% 60–70% 70–80% 80–90% >90% Leonard: 40–50% 50–60% 60–70% 70–80% 80–90% Tie: 40–50% No data
Attorney General before election
Bill Schuette
Republican
Elected Attorney General
Dana Nessel
Democratic

The 2018 Michigan Attorney General election took place on November 6, 2018, alongside elections to elect Michigan's governor, Class I United States Senator, Secretary of State, Michigan's 14 seats in the United States House of Representatives, all 38 seats in the Michigan Senate, and all 110 seats in the Michigan House of Representatives. Incumbent Republican Attorney General Bill Schuette was prohibited from seeking a third term due to term limits, and unsuccessfully ran for governor of Michigan instead. The Michigan GOP was unsuccessful in winning its 5th straight attorney general election. Along with the offices of lieutenant governor and secretary of state, the nominees for attorney general were chosen by party delegates at their respective party conventions.

Nessel defeated Leonard by 115,000 votes, becoming the first Democratic attorney general of Michigan since 2003, when Jennifer Granholm left office to become governor.

== Republican convention ==
=== Candidates ===
==== Nominee ====
- Tom Leonard, speaker of the Michigan House of Representatives

==== Eliminated at convention ====
- Tonya Schuitmaker, state senator

==== Declined ====
- Mary Beth Kelly, former associate justice of the Michigan Supreme Court (2011–2015)

== Democratic convention ==
=== Candidates ===
==== Nominee ====
- Dana Nessel, civil rights attorney

==== Eliminated at convention ====
- Patrick Miles Jr., former United States Attorney for the Western District of Michigan (2012–2017)
- William Noakes, former Wayne County Deputy Corporation Counsel

==== Declined ====
- Steve Bieda, state senator (running for Congress)
- Tim Greimel, state representative and former minority leader of the Michigan House of Representatives (running for Congress)
- Eric Smith, Macomb County Prosecutor

== General election ==
=== Predictions ===
Source	Ranking	As of
Governing	Tossup	October 26, 2018

=== Polling ===
View source data.

Poll source	Date(s) administered	Sample size (Note: Key: A – all adults RV – registered voters LV – likely voters V – unclear)	Margin of error	Tom Leonard (R)	Dana Nessel (D)	Other	Undecided
Glengariff Group	October 25–27, 2018	600 (LV)	± 4.0%	34%	45%	5% (Note: Giola (L) with 3%; Van Sickle (UTP) with 1%; Graveline (I) with 1%)	17%
EPIC-MRA	October 18–23, 2018	600 (LV)	± 4.0%	39%	39%	9% (Note: Giola (L) with 4%; "Other candidate" with 5%)	13%
Michigan State University	October 13–22, 2018	169 (RV)	–	40%	37%	–	–
Marketing Resource Group	October 14–18, 2018	600 (LV)	± 4.0%	34%	39%	10% (Note: "Someone else" with 6%; Giola (L) with 4%)	16%
Glengariff Group	September 30 – October 2, 2018	600 (LV)	± 4.0%	32%	39%	6% (Note: Giola (L) with 4%; Graveline (I) with <1%)	24%
EPIC-MRA	September 21–25, 2018	600 (LV)	± 4.0%	32%	38%	11% (Note: "Other party candidate" with 6%; Giola (L) with 5%)	19%
Glengariff Group	September 5–7, 2018	600 (LV)	± 4.0%	29%	42%	5%	24%

=== Fundraising ===
Campaign finance reports as of October 21, 2018
Candidate (party)	Total receipts	Total disbursements	Cash on hand
Tom Leonard (R)	$1,988,558.29	$1,900,406.09	$88,152.20
Dana Nessel (D)	$1,573,966.91	$1,329,134.98	$244,831.93
Source: Michigan Department of State

=== Results ===
Michigan Attorney General election, 2018
Party	Candidate	Votes	%	±%
Democratic	Dana Nessel	2,031,117	49.04%	+4.85%
Republican	Tom Leonard	1,916,117	46.26%	−5.81%
Libertarian	Lisa Lane Giola	86,807	2.10%	+0.24%
Independent	Chris Graveline	69,889	1.69%	N/A
U.S. Taxpayers'	Gerald Van Sickle	38,114	0.92%	−0.08%
Total votes		4,142,044	100.0%	N/A
Democratic gain from Republican				

==== By congressional district ====
Despite losing the state, Leonard won nine of 14 congressional districts, including two that elected Democrats.

District	Leonard	Nessel	Representative
1st	56%	39%	Jack Bergman
2nd	56%	39%	Bill Huizenga
3rd	52%	43%	Justin Amash
4th	58%	36%	John Moolenaar
5th	44%	51%	Dan Kildee
6th	51%	44%	Fred Upton
7th	53%	42%	Tim Walberg
8th	49%	46%	Mike Bishop
8th	49%	46%	Elissa Slotkin
9th	40%	55%	Sander Levin
9th	40%	55%	Andy Levin
10th	60%	36%	
10th	60%	36%	Paul Mitchell
11th	48.3%	48.0%	Dave Trott
11th	48.3%	48.0%	Haley Stevens
12th	32%	64%	Debbie Dingell
13th	17%	79%	Brenda Jones
13th	17%	79%	Rashida Tlaib
14th	19%	78%	Brenda Lawrence
