= Tim Kelly (Michigan politician) =

American politician (born 1956)

Member of the Michigan House of Representatives from the 93rd district
- Incumbent
- Assumed office January 1, 2025
- Preceded by: Graham Filler

Member of the Michigan House of Representatives from the 94th district
- In office January 1, 2013 – January 1, 2019
- Preceded by: Ken Horn
- Succeeded by: Rodney Wakeman

Personal details
- Born: December 21, 1956 (age 69) Indiana, U.S.
- Party: Republican
- Spouse: Deenie
- Education: University of Denver (BA)
- Website: Campaign website

Tim Kelly (born December 21, 1956) is an American politician. He is a Member of the Michigan House of Representatives from the 93rd district and was a member of the Michigan House of Representatives from the 94th district, first elected in 2012. His district consists of part of Saginaw County.

Prior to his election to the House, Kelly was a member of the Saginaw County Board of Commissioners and chairman of the Saginaw County Republican Party.

He was nominated by President Donald Trump to serve a top position in the Department of Education (Assistant Secretary of Education for Career and Technical Education); however, the administration withdrew the nomination in light of Kelly's statements about women, Muslims, and impoverished parents.

In 2020, Kelly announced that he is running of the United States House of Representatives seat representing Michigan's 5th congressional district. On August 4, 2020, Kelly defeated Earl Lackie in the Republican primary for the congressional seat. On November 3, 2020, Kelly was defeated by incumbent, Dan Kildee.

Kelly successfully ran for the 93rd district in the Michigan House of Representatives in 2024.
