= Michigan's 37th House of Representatives district =

American legislative district

Michigan's 37th State House of Representatives district
Representative
Brad Paquette; R–Niles
- Demographics: 79.6% White; 5.4% Black; 7.1% Hispanic; 1.8% Asian; 0.4% Native American; 0.6% Other; 5.1% Multiracial
- Population (2024): 91,222

Michigan's 37th House of Representatives district is a legislative district within the Michigan House of Representatives located in the counties of Berrien and Cass. The district was created in 1965, when the Michigan Supreme Court ordered the reapportionment of state legislative districts from a county-based system to a proportional one following the Supreme Court case Reynolds v. Sims. It is currently represented by Republican Brad Paquette of Niles.

== List of representatives ==
Representative	Party	Years	Residence	Notes
Vincent J. Petitpren	Democratic	1965–1970	Wayne	
Thomas H. Brown	Democratic	1971–1982	Westland	
Edward E. Mahalak	Democratic	1983–1984	Romulus	Redistricted from the 38th district.
James A. Kosteva	Democratic	1985–1992	Canton Township	
Jan Clark Dolan	Republican	1993–1996	Farmington Hills	Redistricted from the 69th district.
Andrew "Rocky" Raczkowski	Republican	1997–2002	Farmington Hills	Term limited.
Aldo Vagnozzi	Democratic	2003–2008	Farmington Hills	Term limited.
Vicki L. Barnett	Democratic	2009–2014	Farmington Hills	Term limited.
Christine Greig	Democratic	2015–2020	Farmington (until around 2016); Farmington Hills	Term limited.
Samantha Steckloff	Democratic	2021–2022	Farmington Hills	Redistricted to the 19th district.
Brad Paquette	Republican	2023–present	Niles	Redistricted from the 78th district.

== Historical district boundaries ==
Map	Description	Apportionment Plan	Notes
	Wayne County (part): Inkster (part); Nankin Township; Wayne	1964 Apportionment Plan	
	Wayne County (part): Canton Township; Plymouth (part); Wayne (part); Westland (part)	1972 Apportionment Plan	
	Wayne County (part): Belleville; Canton Township (part); Romulus; Van Buren Township; Wayne	1982 Apportionment Plan	
	Oakland County (part): Farmington; Farmington Hills	1992 Apportionment Plan	
	Oakland County (part): Farmington; Farmington Hills	2001 Apportionment Plan	
	Oakland County (part): Farmington; Farmington Hills	2011 Apportionment Plan	
	Berrien County (part): Baroda Township; Berrien Township; Bertrand Township; Buchanan; Buchanan Township; Galien Township; Niles; Niles Charter Township; Oronoko Charter Township; Pipestone Township; Royalton Township; Sodus Township; Three Oaks Township; Weesaw Township; Cass County (part): Dowagiac; Howard Township; LaGrange Township (part); Milton Township; Pokagon Township; Silver Creek Township; Wayne Township	2021 Apportionment Plan (Note: Referred to as the Hickory plan.)	

== Recent elections ==
=== 2020s ===
2026 Michigan House of Representatives election
Party	Candidate	Votes	%
Republican	Brad Paquette (incumbent)	21,907	58.83
Democratic	Angela M. Jones	15,332	41.17
Total votes		37,239	100
Republican hold			

2024 Michigan House of Representatives election
Party	Candidate	Votes	%
Republican	Brad Paquette	30,265	64.89
Democratic	Angela M. Jones	16,379	35.11
Total votes		46,644	100
Republican hold			

2022 Michigan House of Representatives election
Party	Candidate	Votes	%
Republican	Brad Paquette	23,392	64.69
Democratic	Naomi Ludman	12,223	35.31
Total votes		34,615	100
Republican gain from Democratic			

2020 Michigan House of Representatives election
Party	Candidate	Votes	%
Democratic	Samantha Steckloff	34,590	63.88
Republican	Mitch Swoboda	18,464	34.1
Libertarian	James K. Young	1,092	2.02
Total votes		54,146	100
Democratic hold			

=== 2010s ===
2018 Michigan House of Representatives election
Party	Candidate	Votes	%
Democratic	Christine Greig	28,777	67.2
Republican	Mitch Swoboda	14,032	32.8
Total votes		42,809	100
Democratic hold			

2016 Michigan House of Representatives election
Party	Candidate	Votes	%
Democratic	Christine Greig	29,181	60.6
Republican	Mitch Swoboda	17,209	35.8
Libertarian	James K. Young	1,743	3.6
Total votes		48,133	100
Democratic hold			

2014 Michigan House of Representatives election
Party	Candidate	Votes	%
Democratic	Christine Greig	19,148	57.2
Republican	Richard Lerner	14,359	42.9
Total votes		33,507	100
Democratic hold			

2012 Michigan House of Representatives election
Party	Candidate	Votes	%
Democratic	Vicki Barnett	29,554	61.7
Republican	Bruce Lilley	18,354	38.3
Total votes		47,908	100
Democratic hold			

2010 Michigan House of Representatives election
Party	Candidate	Votes	%
Democratic	Vicki Barnett	21,223	62.1
Republican	Christopher Atallah	12,929	37.9
Total votes		34,152	100
Democratic hold			

2008 Michigan House of Representatives election
Party	Candidate	Votes	%
Democratic	Vicki Barnett	28,570	60.1
Republican	Paul Welday	18,953	39.9
Total votes		47,523	100
Democratic hold			
