= Michigan's 93rd House of Representatives district =

American legislative district

Michigan's 93rd State House of Representatives district
Representative
Tim Kelly; R–Saginaw Township
- Demographics: 86.6% White; 4% Black; 4.8% Hispanic; 1.3% Asian; 0.2% Native American; 0.4% Other; 2.7% Multiracial
- Population (2024): 88,603

Michigan's 93rd House of Representatives district (also referred to as Michigan's 93rd House district) is a legislative district within the Michigan House of Representatives located in parts of Clinton, Gratiot, Ionia, Montcalm, and Saginaw counties. The district was created in 1965, when the Michigan House of Representatives district naming scheme changed from a county-based system to a numerical one.

== List of representatives ==
Representative	Party	Dates	Residence	Notes
Peter Kok	Republican	1965–1972	Grand Rapids	
John R. Otterbacher	Democratic	1973–1974	Grand Rapids	
Stephen V. Monsma	Democratic	1975–1978	Grand Rapids	
Drew Allbritten	Republican	1979–1980	Grand Rapids	
John R. Otterbacher	Democratic	1981–1982	Grand Rapids	
Vern Ehlers	Republican	1983–1984	Grand Rapids	Resigned
Richard Bandstra	Republican	1985–1992	Grand Rapids	
Gary L. Randall	Republican	1993–1996	Elwell	
Larry L. DeVuyst	Republican	1997–2002	Alma	Lived in Ithaca until around 1999.
Scott Hummel	Republican	2003–2006	DeWitt	
Paul Opsommer	Republican	2007–2012	DeWitt	
Tom Leonard	Republican	2013–2018	DeWitt Township	
Graham Filler	Republican	2019–2025	Saint Johns	Lived in DeWitt until around 2023.
Tim Kelly	Republican	2025–present	Saginaw Township	

== Recent elections ==
=== 2020s ===
2026 Michigan House of Representatives election
Party	Candidate	Votes	%
Republican	Tim Kelly (incumbent)	26,922	64.66
Democratic	Serenity Hope Salak	14,715	35.34
Total votes		41,637	100
Republican hold			

2024 Michigan House of Representatives election
Party	Candidate	Votes	%
Republican	Tim Kelly	33,943	69.0
Democratic	Kevin Seamon	15,272	31.0
Total votes		49,215	100
Republican hold			

2022 Michigan House of Representatives election
Party	Candidate	Votes	%
Republican	Graham Filler	15,731	64.4
Democratic	Jeffrey Lockwood	14,215	35.6
Total votes		39,946	100
Republican hold			

2020 Michigan House of Representatives election
Party	Candidate	Votes	%
Republican	Graham Filler	34,707	63.2
Democratic	Muhammad Salman Rais	20,224	36.8
Total votes		54,931	100
Republican hold			

2018 Michigan House of Representatives election
Party	Candidate	Votes	%
Republican	Graham Filler	22,265	52.5
Democratic	Dawn D. Levey	18,913	44.6
Libertarian	Tyler Palmer	1,268	3.0
Total votes		42,446	100
Republican hold			

2016 Michigan House of Representatives election
Party	Candidate	Votes	%
Republican	Tom Leonard	29,328	62.1
Democratic	Josh Derke	15,508	32.8
Libertarian	Tyler D. Palmer	2,428	5.1
Total votes		47,264	100
Republican hold			

2014 Michigan House of Representatives election
Party	Candidate	Votes	%
Republican	Tom Leonard	19,103	56.0
Democratic	Josh Derke	11,929	35.0
Independent	Michael Trebesh	3,068	9.0
Total votes		34,100	100
Republican hold			

2012 Michigan House of Representatives election
Party	Candidate	Votes	%
Republican	Tom Leonard	25,283	56.6
Democratic	Paul Silva	19,377	43.4
Total votes		44,660	100
Republican hold			

2010 Michigan House of Representatives election
Party	Candidate	Votes	%
Republican	Paul Opsommer	22,287	70.2
Democratic	Travis Lacelle	9,471	29.8
Total votes		31,758	100
Republican hold			

2008 Michigan House of Representatives election
Party	Candidate	Votes	%
Republican	Paul Opsommer	26,515	57.9
Democratic	Ronald McComb	17,951	39.2
Libertarian	Darryl Schmitz	1,358	3.0
Total votes		45,824	100
Republican hold			

== Historical district boundaries ==
Map	Description	Apportionment Plan	Notes
	Kent County (part): Grand Rapids (part)	1964 Apportionment Plan	
	Kent County (part): Grand Rapids (part)	1972 Apportionment Plan	
	Kent County (part): Grand Rapids (part)	1982 Apportionment Plan	
	Gratiot County (part): Alma; Arcada Township; Bethany Township; Elba Township; Emerson Township; Fulton Township; Hamilton Township; Ithaca; Lafayette Township; Newark Township; New Haven Township; North Shade Township; North Star Township; Pine River Township; St. Louis; Seville Township; Sumner Township; Washington Township; Montcalm County	1992 Apportionment Plan	
	Clinton County (part): Bengal Township; Bingham Township; Dallas Township; DeWitt; DeWitt Township (part); Duplain Township; Eagle Township; East Lansing (part); Essex Township; Grand Ledge (part); Greenbush Township; Lebanon Township; Olive Township; Riley Township; St. Johns; Watertown Township; Westphalia Township; Gratiot County	2001 Apportionment Plan	
	Clinton County Gratiot County (part): Arcada Township (part); Elba Township; Emerson Township (part); Fulton Township; Hamilton Township; Ithaca; Lafayette Township; Newark Township; New Haven Township; North Shade Township; North Star Township; Sumner Township; Washington Township; Wheeler Township	2011 Apportionment Plan	
