= Drew Allbritten =

American politician (1947–2026)

Member of the Michigan House of Representatives from the 93rd district
- In office January 1, 1979 – 1980
- Preceded by: John R. Otterbacher
- Succeeded by: Stephen V. Monsma

Personal details
- Born: April 24, 1947 Akron, Ohio, U.S.
- Died: November 4, 2026 (aged 79)
- Party: Republican

Drew William Allbritten (April 24, 1947 – November 4, 2026) was an American politician. He served as a member of the Michigan House of Representatives from 1979 to 1980.

== Life and career ==
Allbritten was born in Akron, Ohio, on April 24, 1947.

He worked as an educator, starting as middle school and high school mathematics and science teacher. He later worked as a college administrator. On November 7, 1978, Allbritten was elected to the Michigan House of Representatives where he represented the 93rd district from January 10, 1979 to 1980.

Allbritten retired to Cessenon-sur-Orb in France in 2014. He died of cancer on November 4, 2026, at the age of 79.
