= Graham Filler =

American politician (born 1983)

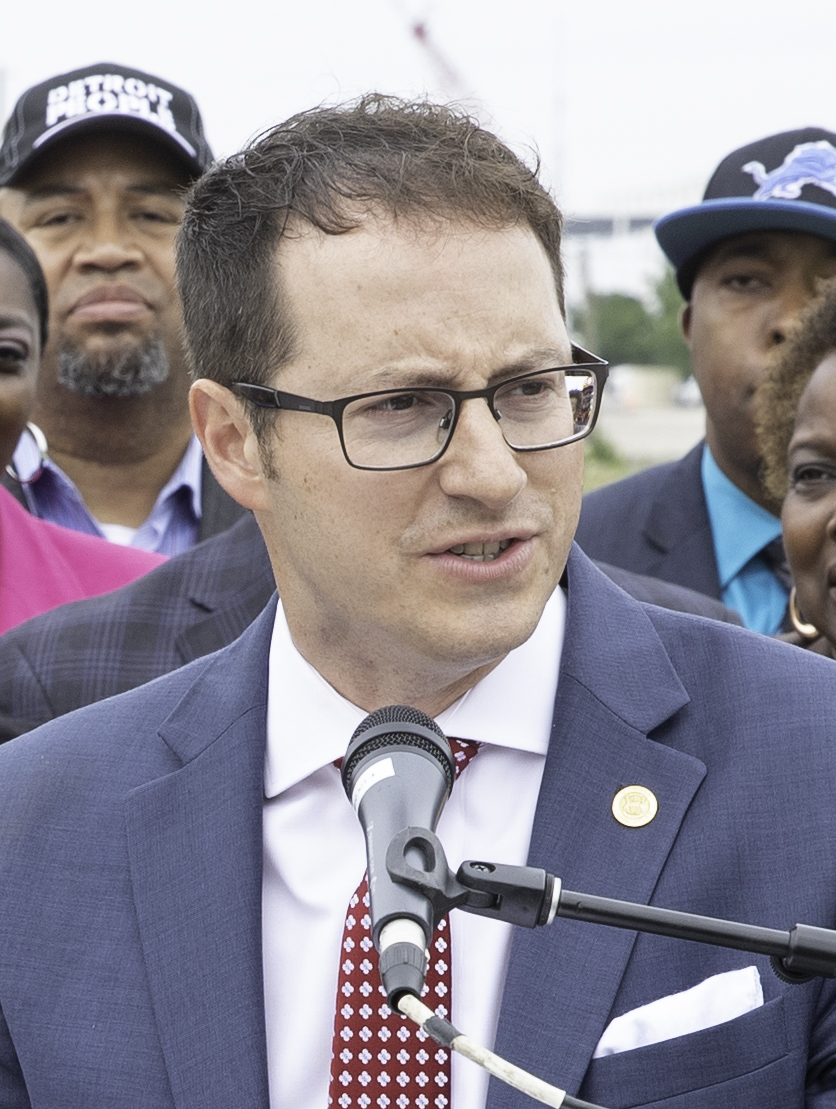

Member of the Michigan House of Representatives from the 93rd district
- In office January 9, 2019 – January 1, 2025
- Preceded by: Tom Leonard
- Succeeded by: Tim Kelly

Personal details
- Born: c. 1983 (age 42–43)
- Party: Republican
- Children: 1
- Education: Miami University; University of Detroit Mercy School of Law
- Website: Graham Filler

Graham Filler (born c. 1983) is a Republican politician. He was a member of the Michigan House of Representatives from 2019 to 2024.

Filler was named an assistant attorney general in 2011. Filler is a member of the Farm Bureau of Michigan, the National Rifle Association of America, and Right to Life of Clinton County.

Political offices
Preceded by Tom Leonard	Michigan Representatives; 93rd District; 2019–present	Succeeded by Incumbent
