= Dana Nessel =

American politician and lawyer (born 1969)

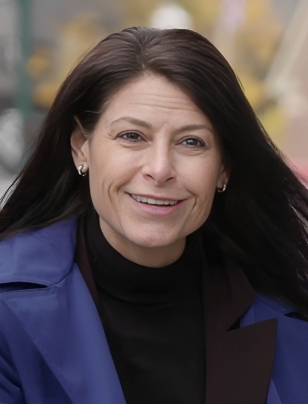
- Nessel in 2020

54th Attorney General of Michigan
- Incumbent
- Assumed office January 1, 2019
- Governor: Gretchen Whitmer
- Preceded by: Bill Schuette

Personal details
- Born: Dana Michelle Nessel; April 19, 1969 (age 57) West Bloomfield Township, Michigan, U.S.
- Party: Democratic
- Spouse: Alanna Maguire (m. 2015)
- Children: 2
- Education: University of Michigan (BA); Wayne State University (JD)

Dana Michelle Nessel (born April 19, 1969) is an American politician and lawyer, serving as the 54th Attorney General of Michigan since January 2019. She is a member of the Democratic Party.

Nessel is the second openly lesbian woman elected attorney general of a state in the United States (after Maura Healey), and the first openly LGBT person elected to statewide office in Michigan. She is also the first Jewish person elected Attorney General of Michigan.

In 2014, Nessel successfully argued for the plaintiffs in DeBoer v. Snyder, which challenged Michigan's ban on the statewide legal recognition of same-sex marriage; the case was eventually combined with others and appealed to the Supreme Court of the United States as Obergefell v. Hodges, which led to the nationwide legal recognition of same-sex marriage.

== Early life and education ==
Nessel was born in West Bloomfield Township, Michigan, the daughter of Martin and Sandra Nessel. She is Jewish. She was raised in West Bloomfield and graduated from West Bloomfield High School in 1987, where she played soccer and was named All-State.

Nessel received a Bachelor of Arts with a major in political science from the University of Michigan in 1990 and a Juris Doctor from Wayne State University Law School in 1994. While in college, she also performed standup comedy for several years. While in law school, she was an intern in the Wayne County Prosecutor's Office.

== Career ==
After graduating from law school, Nessel worked as an assistant prosecutor in Wayne County for eleven years. She was the primary attorney on over 1,665 cases dealing with homicides, armed robberies, child abuse, sex crimes, carjackings and drug crimes.

In 2005, Nessel opened her legal firm, Nessel and Kessel Law with Chris Kessel, also a graduate of Wayne State Law School, where she handled criminal defense cases, civil rights actions, family law matters, and general tort litigation. While in private practice, she successfully represented the plaintiffs in DeBoer v. Snyder (2014).

== Michigan Attorney General (2019–present) ==
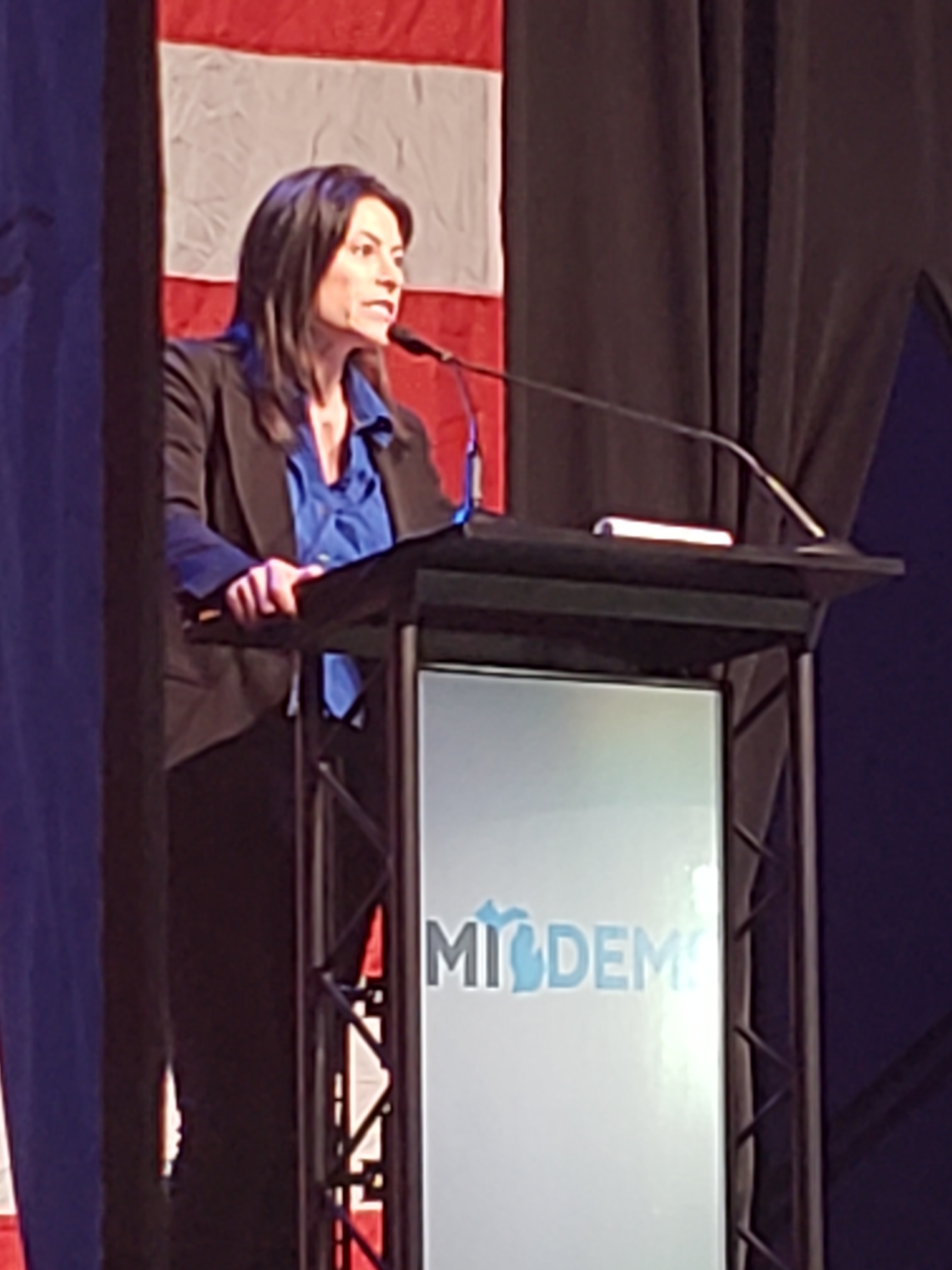
Nessel speaks at the Michigan Democratic Party convention

In 2018, Nessel won the Democratic Party nomination for Michigan Attorney General over former U.S. Attorney for Western Michigan Patrick Miles Jr. She then narrowly defeated Republican state House Speaker Tom Leonard and three other candidates in the general election. She succeeded term-limited Republican Bill Schuette who ran unsuccessfully for the office of Governor.

Nessel was sworn into office on January 1, 2019. She is the first openly LGBTQ person elected to statewide office in Michigan. She became the first Democrat to serve as attorney general since Jennifer Granholm left the office in 2003, sixteen years earlier to become the new Michigan Governor.

Nessel immediately withdrew Michigan from eight federal lawsuits initiated by Schuette involving the separation of church and state, LGBTQ discrimination, environmental protection, and abortion.

=== Hate Crimes Unit ===
After a rise of hate crimes in Michigan for two years in a row, Nessel launched a Hate Crimes Unit within the Criminal Division of the Department of Attorney General. Before Nessel took office, the Michigan Department of Attorney General did not have any personnel assigned solely to the investigation and prosecution of hate crimes.

=== Conviction Integrity Unit ===
Nessel launched a new Conviction Integrity Unit within the Department of Attorney General's Criminal Appellate Division. The unit investigates credible claims of innocence and rectifies wrongful convictions. To do this, officials work with county prosecutors, law enforcement officials, defense attorneys, and innocence clinic projects.

=== Consumer Protection Division ===
Under her Consumer Protection Division, Nessel launched the state's first Payroll Fraud Enforcement Unit to investigate Michigan establishments that illegally misclassify workers or withhold wages and benefits. She also established the Department's Auto Insurance Fraud Unit, which received over 3,000 cases in four months.

Keeping her promise to protect and defend consumers and ratepayers, Nessel saved utility customers $3.6 million after intervening in SEMCO Energy's gas recovery plan case. As of the end of 2019, Nessel has helped save Michigan utility ratepayers a combined $355,809,700.

=== Elder Abuse Task Force ===
In collaboration with the Michigan Supreme Court, Nessel launched the Michigan Elder Abuse Task Force to combat physical abuse, financial exploitation, emotional abuse, and neglect of senior citizens. Nearly 50 different organizations including law enforcement, state agencies, the Michigan House of Representatives, Michigan Senate, Michigan Congressional delegation, and advocacy groups, have joined the task force. The task force initiatives include requiring professional guardians to become certified, developing statutory basic rights for families, reviewing the process of a guardian removing a ward from their home, and limiting the number of wards per guardian.

=== Michigan state COVID-19 pandemic policy ===
In March 2021, Nessel decided not to launch a criminal investigation into the impact of Governor Gretchen Whitmer's coronavirus pandemic policy of placing elderly patients who tested positive for COVID-19 in the same nursing home facilities as patients who did not contract coronavirus. At the time of Nessel's decision, an estimated 35% of all Michigan coronavirus deaths had occurred in long-term care facilities. The Michigan state government had been accused of underreporting deaths from COVID-19 that had occurred in long-term care facilities, and had denied freedom of information requests to investigate the matter. The Michigan Office of the Auditor General later reviewed the state's coronavirus data and found that the long-term care facility coronavirus death count up to July 2021 had underreported deaths in these facilities by 42%, while Governor Whitmer denies the findings in the audit. Auditor General Doug Ringler claimed that his office "didn't feel the word 'underreport' was fair. We cited it as a difference."

=== Robocall crackdown effort ===
Nessel started a statewide campaign to crack down on illegal robocalls targeting Michigan residents. This campaign includes initiatives to educate the public, toughen enforcement, and update state law. As of March 2020, over 2,400 caller complaints of illegal robocalls had been received by Nessel's office.

Additionally, Nessel joined a bipartisan group of state attorneys general in filing a brief in the U.S. Supreme Court in Barr v. American Assn. of Political Consultants, Inc.; the AGs argued in favor of preserving the anti-robocall provisions of the federal Telephone Consumer Protection Act.

=== Twitter death threat ===
On March 2, 2023, Nessel announced that she was among several Jewish government officials targeted in antisemitic threats made on social media by a heavily armed Michigan man. Jack Eugene Carpenter III, of Tipton, Michigan, was charged in federal court with transmitting an interstate threat, a felony. Carpenter was accused of tweeting from Texas in February 2023: "I'm heading back to Michigan now threatening to carry out the punishment of death to anyone that is jewish in the Michigan govt if they don't leave, or confess." Carpenter possessed three handguns, a shotgun, and two rifles, and was under investigation for stealing a handgun, according to federal prosecutors. Commenting on the threat on Twitter, Nessel stated: "It is my sincere hope that the federal authorities take this offense just as seriously as my Hate Crimes & Domestic Terrorism Unit takes plots to murder elected officials." Carpenter was found incompetent to stand trial, suffering from a combination of unusually grandiose conspiracy theories and a persecution complex, with threatening posts toward others included a vow to execute Elon Musk.

=== 2026 Michigan Convention Boycott ===
Dana Nessel, has claimed that she has faced antisemitic harassment and has said that she plans to skip the state party’s 2026 Democratic convention due to the threats of further abuse. In a statement regarding the convention Nessel said: “I don’t feel safe going,” Nessel reportedly said. “I feel like my presence isn’t going to be welcome. I don’t want to get chased around. I don’t want to get harassed. I don’t want to get yelled and screamed at. I don’t want to get booed off the stage, irrespective of what I’m saying.”

However Nessel has also made statements telling American Jews that they need to prioritize the wider population's safety over their own, invoking the Queen Esther story from the Jewish holiday of Purim as an example. Saying in a statement at a meeting of Michigan Jewish Democrats that they need “to place the needs of the world above even our own self-interest and, yes, even our own survival.”

=== High-profile cases and investigations ===
==== Catholic Church investigation ====
Nessel took over the department's investigation into Catholic Church sexual abuse cases from her predecessor, Bill Schuette. As of December 2019, the Department of Attorney General has received 641 tips on its clergy abuse hotline, identified 270 priests alleged to be abusers from dioceses in Marquette, Gaylord, and Grand Rapids, and received allegations involving 552 victims of clergy sexual abuse since the beginning of the investigation. So far, 1.5 million paper documents and 3.5 million electronic documents have been seized. The investigation team has reviewed 130 cases for potential charges, 50 of which were closed because the statute of limitations barred prosecution or the priest in question had died. Twenty-five cases have been referred back to the diocese for action because the priests were in active ministry.

In a February 2019 news conference, Nessel accused Catholic Church leadership of failing to cooperating with law enforcement, and criticized them for encouraging some victims to sign confidential settlements or nondisclosure agreements. Nessel told church officials to stop "self-policing" sexual abuse within the church and to encourage victims to talk with state investigators, adding "If an investigator comes to your door and asks to speak with you, please ask to see their badge and not their rosary." Some criticized Nessel for the "rosary" statement, viewing it as an insensitive barb against a devotional practice.

In October 2020, Nessel released interim report with results of her office's two-year investigation; the office's report accused 454 priests of sexually abusing 811 people in the state of Michigan across all seven dioceses. Eleven priests were charged in Michigan with sex crimes from 2019 onward: several pleaded guilty, with extradition proceedings against others were pending. In October 2022, Nessel released a detailed report on allegations of sexual abuse in the Diocese of Marquette, listing abuse allegations, dating back to 1950, against 44 priests. This is the first of seven diocese-by-diocese final reports that the AG's Office plans to release.

==== Michigan State University investigation ====
After the Larry Nassar scandal, Nessel's office launched an investigation into Michigan State University (MSU). Ultimately, Nessel charged MSU president Lou Anna Simon; Kathie Klages, the head coach for MSU's gymnastics team while Nassar was team doctor; and William Strampel, former dean of the MSU's College of Osteopathic Medicine, a former boss of Nassar. Strampel was convicted in a jury trial of one felony count of misconduct in office and two misdemeanor counts of willful neglect of duty; an appeals court upheld the convictions in 2021. Klages was convicted of obstruction of justice in 2018 and sentenced to 90 days in jail, but the Michigan Court of Appeals vacated the conviction in 2022 on a 2–1 vote. The charges against Simon were dismissed in 2020; Nessel's office appealed, but a Michigan Court of Appeals panel unanimously upheld the dismissal in 2022; in a concurring opinion, Judge Elizabeth L. Gleicher criticized the investigation into Simon as a "sham" and wrote that the former university president was a "scapegoat" and "high profile target, selected to assuage public anger rather than to protect the integrity of the law."

In 2019, Nessel said her department was at an impasse with MSU, which was withholding more than 6,000 documents under the claim of attorney-client privilege. Nessel, survivors, and activists called on the university to release the documents. In 2023, the MSU board of trustees voted against waiving privilege over the documents.

==== Enbridge Line 5 lawsuits ====
In 2018, Michigan passed legislation approved under former Governor Rick Snyder codifying an agreement between the state and Enbridge Energy to replace the Enbridge Line 5 pipeline, which sat on the lakebed under the Straits of Mackinac with a tunnel below the bedrock. Despite a judge's ruling upholding the law in March 2019, Nessel issued an opinion that month stating the law was unconstitutional “because its provisions go beyond the scope of what was disclosed in its title." After Enbridge filed a lawsuit, a Michigan Court of Claims judge ruled in favor of Enbridge and rejected Nessel's reasoning, stating, "the argument advanced by defendants misses the mark."

Upon appeal to the Michigan Court of Appeals, Nessel's request to overturn the Court of Claims decision was denied and her opinion was again overruled, allowing Enbridge to continue work on the tunnel and requiring the state to process the necessary permits.

In June 2019, Nessel filed suit independently in Ingham County Circuit Court, seeking an order requiring Line 5 to shut down (permanently decommission) "after reasonable notice"; the suit argues that the operation of Line 5 violates the public trust doctrine, is a common-law public nuisance, and violates the Michigan Environmental Protection Act because of its likeliness to cause pollution to and destruction of the Great Lakes and other natural resources. The attorneys general of Minnesota, Wisconsin and California have filed friend-of-the-court briefs in support of Nessel's lawsuit. In 2021, the case was removed to federal court. Proceedings were delayed while the parties battled over whether the suit would be heard in state or federal court; in August 2022, a federal judge ruled that the case would be heard in federal court.

==== PFAS contamination lawsuit ====
In January 2020, Nessel filed suit against 17 companies, including 3M and DuPont, alleging the toxic per- and polyfluoroalkyl (PFAS) chemical manufacturers “intentionally hid” known health and environmental risks from the public and state while continuing to sell the PFAS chemicals since the 1950s. The suit seeks to hold the companies financially responsible for all past and future costs associated with the contamination at dozens of sites across the state of Michigan.

==== Flint Water Crisis investigation ====
===== Campaign =====
While campaigning to become Attorney General for Michigan, Nessel made a series of statements regarding the Flint Water Crisis and its investigation leading up to the 2018 Michigan Attorney General election which took place on November 6, 2018.

- On April 4, 2018, then-candidate Nessel met with community members at the Flint Public Library and spoke with NBC 25, a local television station which serves Flint and the Tri-Cities area. If elected, Nessel said she would not be held to corporate interests, and would protect the citizens of Flint. "The last thing we need is to have people in government that poison their own residents, that engage in cover-ups, or who use a terrible incident like that to politicize the office of attorney general and use it for their own personal gain. We need someone who just cares about our state residents once again and that’s what I want to do,” said Nessel.
- On October 12, 2018 Nessel told WDET-FM, a public radio station in Detroit, she "did not believe that these cases have been handled correctly.” Nessel hinted at the possibility of withdrawing or dismissing charges, saying "whether or not there are bad actors that should have been charged or not, including the governor, I think that has to be reevaluated and reexamined,” she says.
- Nessel had told the Macomb Daily on October 18, 2018 she "could see [the potential for expanded prosecutions]" and "did not agree with the way the prosecutions [had] unfolded." Nessel cited her opposition to Todd Flood, a prominent donor to then Governor Rick Snyder, being named as the crisis' special prosecutor who would potentially investigate Snyder.
- That same day, Nessel had told Michigan Radio she was "suspect of [the Flint] investigation quite frankly from the beginning. Nessel felt "political expediency was being prioritized instead of justice." As Attorney General, she said she would "take a second look at the investigation, make certain that all of the people who have charges pending have been charged properly and look to see if there’s anyone who should have been charged, but who hasn’t been."
- In a series of three videos produced and released between September and October 2018 by her campaign, "Dana Nessel For Michigan Attorney General," Nessel stood before Michigan's waterways and promised a tough stance on justice for the city of Flint along with committing to other protections regarding clean water for Michiganders.

===== Dismissal of charges =====
After assuming office and taking over the investigation of the Flint Water Crisis from former Attorney General Bill Schuette, Nessel announced that she would be handling the settlements of the 79 Flint civil lawsuits while Solicitor General Fadwa Hammoud and Wayne County Prosecutor Kym Worthy would handle the criminal cases.

On June 13, 2019, Michigan Attorney General Nessel's office dismissed all pending criminal cases tied to the Flint water crisis. Under Michigan's previous attorney general, a Republican, 15 people were charged with crimes related to the water crisis. Several pleaded no contest and were convicted. Prosecutorial overreach possibly tainting the judicial process plagued the investigation from the beginning.

The dismissal effectively ended prosecutions of eight current and former officials accused of neglecting their duties and allowing Flint residents to drink tainted, dangerous water. Children of Flint drank poisoned water with dangerous quantities of lead. At least 12 people died in a Legionnaires’ outbreak that prosecutors linked to the water change. Among the officials whose charges were dropped: the former director of the Michigan Department of Health and Human Services, a state epidemiologist, a former Flint public works director and emergency managers who had been appointed to oversee the city. Some defendants had faced charges as serious as involuntary manslaughter. The defence lawyer for Howard Croft, the former Flint public works director who was charged with involuntary manslaughter, said the "attorney general’s decision validated his concerns about the investigation" and credited Nessel's "courage" in deciding to dismiss all criminal charges.

The decision to dismiss all charges was met with considerable outrage from Michiganders, clean water activists, and residents of Flint, the latter who felt their crisis was being forgotten. Prosecutors Fadwa Hammoud and Kym Worthy, who oversaw the case, blamed missteps by the previous prosecution team for their office's decision, citing "immediate and grave concerns about the investigative approach and legal theories." Hammoud and Worthy noted they were not precluded from refiling charges against the defendants or adding new charges and defendants.

Nessel defended her prosecutors’ decision to drop the charges, but also sought to assuage the concerns of Flint residents, stating "justice delayed is not always justice denied."

Nessel has since opened the first ever satellite location of the Attorney General's Office in Flint. Two victim advocates reside in the office along with the Flint Water Crisis prosecution team.

==== Opioid manufacturers lawsuit ====
Nessel filed a lawsuit on behalf of the state of Michigan in December 2019 against opioid distributors using a law to pursue drug dealers. Nessel said that Michigan is the first state to sue drug manufacturers in this way. The companies involved in the suit are Illinois-based Walgreens, Ohio-based Cardinal Health Inc., Texas-based McKesson Corporation, and Pennsylvania-based AmerisourceBergen Drug Corporation. According to the suit, the defendant drug companies sold opioids “in ways that facilitated and encouraged their flow into the illegal, secondary market” without proper safeguards, and they failed to monitor or report suspicious orders, including by knowingly selling pain pills to so-called pill mills. The damages against the defendants are projected to exceed $1 billion.

==== St. Vincent adoption agency lawsuit ====
Shortly after taking office, Nessel changed state policy to require that contracts with adoption agencies refusing to work directly with LGBT couples be terminated; previously, such agencies had been allowed (and been required) to refer LGBT couples to different adoption agencies. The St. Vincent adoption agency, a Catholic organization, sued Nessel, asking to be allowed to continue operating under state contract as before the new policy. U.S. District Judge Robert Jonker ruled in favor of the adoption agency, writing that "the state's new position targets St. Vincent's religious beliefs." Nessel requested a stay of the ruling, but Jonker denied this as well, stating, "the state has offered nothing new and has failed to come to grips with the factual basis on the preliminary injunction record that supports the inference of religious targeting in this case." In March 2022, the state agreed to pay $550,000 to reimburse St. Vincent's legal fees, along with an additional $250,000 to Catholic Charities of West Michigan, also to reimburse legal fees in a similar case.

==== Affordable Care Act lawsuit ====
Shortly after assuming office, Nessel joined a coalition of other attorneys general in a lawsuit to support the Affordable Care Act (PPACA). Nessel cites the “hundreds and thousands” of residents in Michigan who would lose access to healthcare, particularly those with pre-existing conditions, as her reason for joining the suit. The U.S. Supreme Court upheld the PPACA in 2021.

==== Trump fake electors plot ====
Nessel announced in January 2022 that after a months-long inquiry into the Michigan participants in the Trump fake electors plot, she had closed down the state probe and asked the U.S. Justice Department to open a criminal investigation. Deputy U.S. attorney general Lisa Monaco confirmed days later that the Justice Department was examining the matter. Nessel announced in January 2023 that she was reopening her investigation "because I don't know what the federal government plans to do."

On July 18, 2023, Nessel announced that she had indicted sixteen individuals with eight felony counts each, including forgery. According to Nessel, these individuals had knowingly signed a false certificate of ascertainment claiming to be the "duly elected and qualified electors" for Michigan.

==== University of Michigan student protests ====
The University of Michigan board of regents recruited Nessel to crack down on pro-Palestinian student protestors when local prosecutors dismissed 36 cases among 40 arrested and recommended 4 for diversion programs. In September 2024, she charged several protestors with felonies over their refusal to disperse from the encampment. In April 2025, the FBI and Ann Arbor Police raided the homes of University of Michigan activists in what Nessel called a multijurisdictional investigation into vandalism. The case drew criticism for applying a double standard toward protests of Israel’s war on Gaza and alleged Israeli war crimes relative to other protests, including comments from Representative Rashida Tlaib misquoted by Nessel to be about her religion in an accusation of antisemitism. In May, the charges against seven protestors were dropped amid scrutiny over Nessel's financial and personal ties to regents and continued allegations of prosecutorial bias.

==== Subpoenas of Pro-Palestinian Activists ====
After having to drop charges related to University of Michigan protests, Nessel issued a series of subpoenas in July 2025 to summon activists for questioning on multi-jurisdictional graffiti charges, along with seizing electronics and some personal belongings. During at least one raid, according to activists, agents broke down a door without showing a warrant. Critics described the continued effort as part of a pattern to intimidate and silence protesters with Liz Jacob, an attorney representing University of Michigan organizers, describing "[if] people cannot speak out freely against Israel’s ongoing human rights violations, genocide, and apartheid without facing governmental repression, then the freedom of speech of every person in Michigan is at risk."

== Personal life ==
Nessel met her wife Alanna Maguire while they were both working on the legal case DeBoer v. Snyder, which was ultimately successful in striking down Michigan's ban on same-sex marriage. Nessel proposed to Maguire in 2015 outside of the United States Supreme Court. The couple married in July 2015 with the marriage being officiated by Judge Bernard A. Friedman, who had originally struck down Michigan's same-sex marriage ban in March 2014.

Nessel and Maguire have twin sons.

== Awards ==
Awards Presented to Dana Nessel
Year	Title	Awarded by	Ref.
2014	Champion of Justice	Michigan State Bar Association	
2015	Woman of the Year	Michigan Lawyers Weekly	
2017	Treasure of Detroit	Wayne State University Law School	
2019	LGBTQ+ Inclusion Award	Lansing City Pulse	
2019	Frank J. Kelley Consumer Protection Advocacy Award	State Bar of Michigan's Consumer Law Section	
2019	Public Official of the Year	Michigan League of Conservation Voters	
2020	Jane Elder Environmentalist of the Year	Michigan Sierra Club	

== Electoral history ==
Michigan Attorney General election, 2018
Party	Candidate	Votes	%	±%
Democratic	Dana Nessel	2,021,797	49.01%	+4.82%
Republican	Tom Leonard	1,909,171	46.28%	−5.83%
Libertarian	Lisa Lane Giola	86,692	2.10%	+0.24%
Independent	Chris Graveline	69,707	1.69%	N/A
Constitution	Gerald Van Sickle	38,103	0.92%	−0.08%
Majority		112,626	2.73%	−5.19%
Turnout		4,125,470		+34.07%
Democratic gain from Republican		Swing		

Michigan Attorney General election, 2022
Party	Candidate	Votes	%	±%
Democratic	Dana Nessel (incumbent)	2,329,195	53.16%	+4.12%
Republican	Matthew DePerno	1,952,408	44.56%	−1.70%
Libertarian	Joseph W. McHugh Jr.	67,846	1.55%	−0.55%
Constitution	Gerald T. Van Sickle	32,431	0.74%	−0.18%
Total votes		4,381,880	100.0%	
Democratic hold				

== See also ==
- List of Jewish American jurists

Party political offices
Preceded by Mark Totten	Democratic nominee for Attorney General of Michigan; 2018, 2022	Succeeded by Eli Savit
Legal offices
Preceded by Bill Schuette	Attorney General of Michigan; 2019–present	Incumbent
