= Paul Opsommer =

American politician

The Honorable Paul E. Opsommer

Member of the Michigan House of Representatives from the 93rd district
- In office January 1, 2007 – December 31, 2012
- Preceded by: Scott Hummell
- Succeeded by: Tom Leonard

Mayor of DeWitt
- In office January 8, 2001 – December 31, 2006
- Succeeded by: James F. Rundborg

Personal details
- Born: 1952 (age 73–74)
- Party: Republican
- Spouse: Barbara
- Education: Michigan State University

Paul Opsommer is a Republican former member of the Michigan House of Representatives, representing an area directly north of Lansing from 2007 through 2012. Prior to his election to the House, Opsommer was the mayor and a member of the DeWitt City Council.

Opsommer was the vice president of Action Management Corporation in Flint and is active with many local governmental agencies and boards. He also served on the Clinton County Conservation Board for 12 years.
