= Aldo Vagnozzi =

American politician

Member of the Michigan House of Representatives from the 37th district
- In office January 1, 2003 – December 31, 2008
- Preceded by: Andrew "Rocky" Raczkowski
- Succeeded by: Vicki Barnett

Personal details
- Born: October 4, 1925 Roseto, Italy
- Died: March 22, 2009 (aged 83) Farmington Hills, Michigan
- Party: Democratic
- Education: Wayne State University

Military service
- Allegiance: United States
- Branch/service: United States Army
- Years of service: 1943–1946
- Rank: Sergeant

Aldo Vagnozzi (October 4, 1925 – March 22, 2009) was a Democratic politician from the state of Michigan. Vagnozzi was a member of the Michigan State House of Representatives. He represented the 37th District, which is located in Oakland County and includes the cities of Farmington Hills and Farmington, from 2003 until 2008.

== Early life ==
Vagnozzi was born in Roseto, Italy. In 1943, he was drafted out of college to serve in the military for the Americans in World War II. He served in San Bernardino, where he was an interpreter with Italian prisoners of war. He participated in the return of prisoners to Italy in spring of 1946. Vagnozzi was discharged in 1946, with the rank of sergeant. Vagnozzi returned to college in 1946, attending Wayne State University. He graduated in 1948 with a Bachelor of Arts degree in journalism. While in college, he edited the award-winning Daily Collegian. Out of college, Vagnozzi was editor of both the Michigan State AFL-CIO News and the Detroit Labor News.

== Political career ==
Vagnozzi served on the Farmington School Board from 1969 to 1973. He was elected to the Farmington Hills City Council in 1987. He served as Mayor from 1995 to 1999. Vagnozzi ran unsuccessfully for The Michigan State House in 2000, receiving 48% to his opponents 50%. He ran again in 2002, this time he won, receiving 52% of the vote. He was re-elected again in 2004 and again in 2006. He sat on the powerful Appropriations Committee.

== Personal ==
Vagnozzi was married to Lois Carl until her death in 1999. They had 4 children and 9 grandchildren. He was a long time member of St. Alexander's Catholic Church.

== Death ==
Vagnozzi died on March 22, 2009, in Farmington Hills, Michigan.

== Electoral history ==
- 2006 election for State House
  - Aldo Vagnozzi (D), 62%
  - Dennis Malaney (R), 38%
- 2004 election for State House
  - Aldo Vagnozzi (D), 57%
  - William Largent (R), 43%
- 2002 election for State House
  - Aldo Vagnozzi (D), 52%
  - Valerie Knol (R), 48%
- 2000 election for State House
  - Aldo Vagnozzi (D), 48%
  - Andrew Raczkowski (R), 52%
