= Vicki Barnett =

American politician (born 1954)

Member of the Michigan House of Representatives from the 37th district
- In office January 1, 2009 – December 31, 2014
- Preceded by: Aldo Vagnozzi
- Succeeded by: Christine Greig

Personal details
- Born: July 8, 1954 (age 72) Detroit, Michigan, U.S.
- Party: Democratic
- Spouse: Mark Steckloff
- Education: University of Michigan, Dearborn

Vicki Barnett (born July 8, 1954) is an American politician who served as a member of the Michigan House of Representatives from 2009 to 2014, representing the 37th District. A member of the Democratic Party, Barnett served as the mayor of Farmington Hills, Michigan from 2003 to 2007 and from 2019 to 2023. Barnett was the unsuccessful Democratic nominee for Oakland County Executive in 2016.

== Biography ==
Vicki Barnett was born on July 8, 1954, to a Jewish family in Detroit, Michigan. She received a bachelor's degree from the University of Michigan-Dearborn in 1983, and later received her master's degree in Business Administration in 1991, also from the University of Michigan-Dearborn. She has worked as an investment consultant at LPL Financial in Farmington Hills since 1999, and is a licensed accident, life, and health insurance agent. Barnett married her husband, attorney Mark Steckloff, in 1981, and together they have two children, Samantha and Jordan. She belongs to the Roosevelt Group of the Greater Detroit Chapter of Hadassah, an American Jewish volunteer women's organization.

== Political career ==
Barnett was elected to Farmington Hills City Council in 1995. She served two four-year terms in this position until 2003, when she was elected Mayor. She served as Mayor for the maximum two consecutive two-year terms, through 2007.

In 2008, she announced her intention to run for the 37th State House seat, which was left open by the retirement of longtime Democratic legislator Aldo Vagnozzi, who could not run for re-election due to term limits. Barnett was unopposed in the Democratic primary and faced Republican Paul Welday in the General Election. Barnett's popularity as Mayor led to a 60%-40% victory over Welday.

In 2010, Barnett retained her seat with an even stronger showing against Republican Chris Atallah, garnering 61% of the vote. Barnett was thereafter named House Minority Whip.

Barnett won her third and final term on November 6, 2012, by her largest margin, over Republican Bruce Lilley. Barnett received almost 62% of votes cast in Farmington and Farmington Hills.

Facing term limits, Barnett announced in late 2013 she was running for the Michigan State Senate's 14th District, but narrowly lost a three-way race in the Democratic primary election to the incumbent State Senator Vincent Gregory, who received 34.68% of the vote to Barnett's 34.28%.

In 2016, she was the Democratic candidate for Oakland County Executive against six-term incumbent Republican L. Brooks Patterson, where she garnered 46.1% of the vote, the highest any Democratic candidate had ever received against Patterson.

In 2019, she again successfully ran for Mayor of Farmington Hills, where she now serves. She was reelected in 2021.

== Electoral history ==
- 2008 Election for State House
  - Vicki Barnett (D), 60%
  - Paul Welday (R), 40%
- 2010 Election for State House
  - Vicki Barnett (D), 61%
  - Chris Atallah (R), 38%
- 2012 Election for State House
  - Vicki Barnett (D), 61.6%
  - Bruce Lilley (R), 38.3%
- 2016 Election for Oakland County Executive
  - L. Brooks Patterson (R), 53.5%
  - Vicki Barnett (D), 46.1%
