= Essex Township, Michigan =

- Civil township
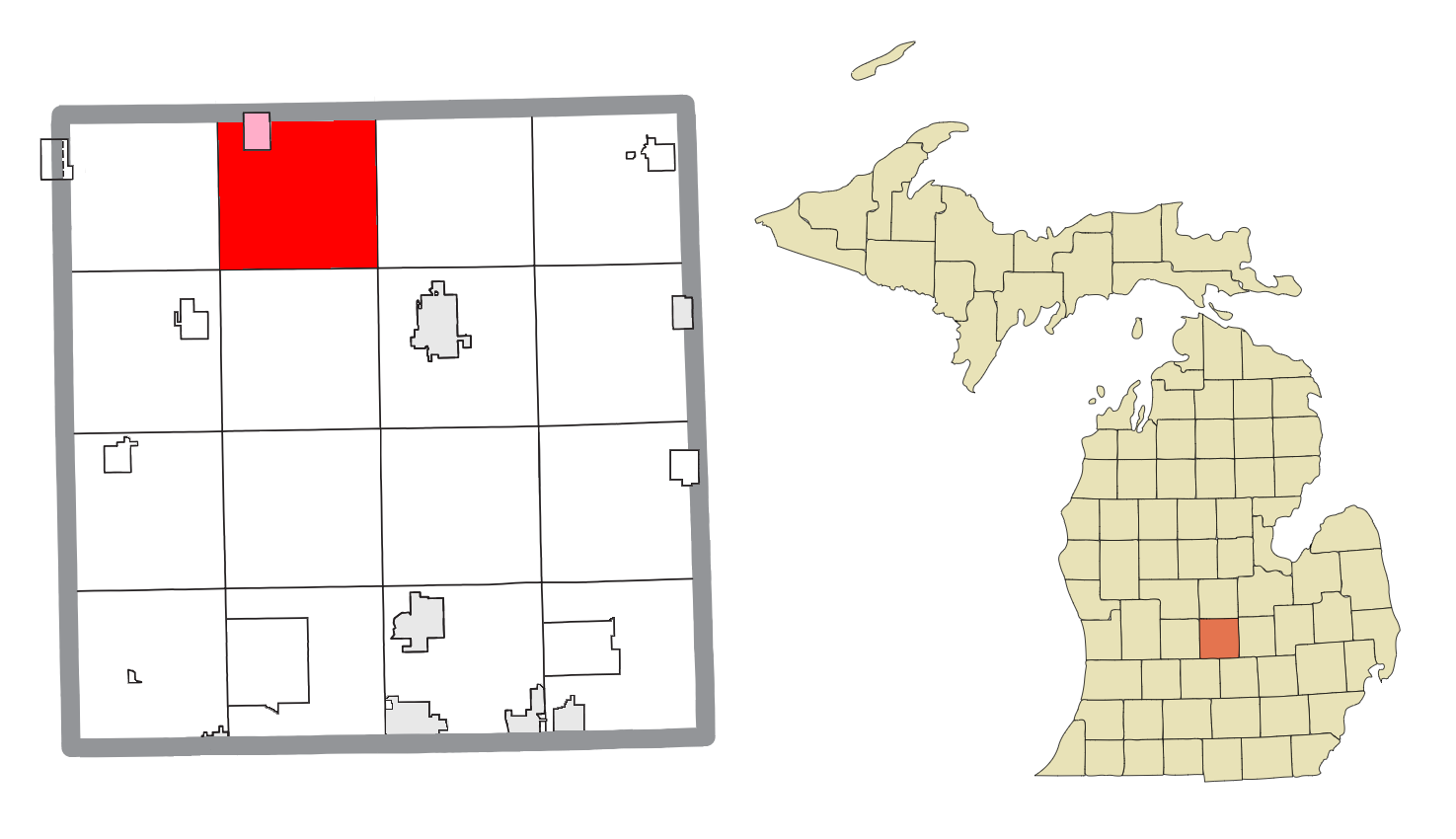
- Location within Clinton County (red) and the administered village of Maple Rapids (pink)

- Location within the state of Michigan Location within the United States
- Coordinates: 43°04′44″N 84°39′06″W
- Country: United States
- State: Michigan
- County: Clinton

Government
  - Supervisor: Carla Wardin
  - Clerk: Lori Conner

Area
  - Total: 35.60 sq mi (92.20 km^{2})
  - Land: 35.36 sq mi (91.58 km^{2})
  - Water: 0.24 sq mi (0.62 km^{2})
- Elevation: 705 ft (215 m)

Population (2020)
  - Total: 1,827
  - Density: 51.67/sq mi (19.95/km^{2})
- Time zone: UTC-5 (Eastern (EST))
  - Summer (DST): UTC-4 (EDT)
- ZIP code(s): 48835 (Fowler); 48853 (Maple Rapids); 48871 (Perrinton); 48879 (St. Johns)
- Area code: 989
- FIPS code: 26-26400
- GNIS feature ID: 1626249
- Website: Official website

Essex Township is a civil township of Clinton County in the U.S. state of Michigan. The population was 1,827 at the 2020 census.

== Communities ==
- East Essex was the name of a post office in the township from 1856 until 1858.
- Maple Rapids is a village in the northern part of the township.

== Geography ==
According to the United States Census Bureau, the township has a total area of 35.60 square miles (92.20 km^{2}), of which 35.36 square miles (91.58 km^{2}) is land and 0.24 square miles (0.62 km^{2}) (0.67%) is water.

Essex Township is located in northern Clinton County and is bordered to the north by Gratiot County. The Maple River, a tributary of the Grand River, flows across the northwest corner of the township, past the village of Maple Rapids. The township contains portions of the Maple River State Game Area.

== Demographics ==
As of the census of 2000, there were 1,812 people, 635 households, and 509 families residing in the township. The population density was 50.9 inhabitants per square mile (19.7/km^{2}). There were 659 housing units at an average density of 18.5 per square mile (7.1/km^{2}). The racial makeup of the township was 98.95% White, 0.11% African American, 0.28% Native American, 0.06% Asian, 0.06% Pacific Islander, 0.33% from other races, and 0.22% from two or more races. Hispanic or Latino of any race were 1.16% of the population.

There were 635 households, out of which 40.9% had children under the age of 18 living with them, 70.1% were married couples living together, 6.9% had a female householder with no husband present, and 19.7% were non-families. 16.4% of all households were made up of individuals, and 8.0% had someone living alone who was 65 years of age or older. The average household size was 2.85 and the average family size was 3.20.

In the township the population was spread out, with 30.1% under the age of 18, 7.6% from 18 to 24, 29.1% from 25 to 44, 23.5% from 45 to 64, and 9.8% who were 65 years of age or older. The median age was 35 years. For every 100 females, there were 101.1 males. For every 100 females age 18 and over, there were 96.1 males.

The median income for a household in the township was $47,647, and the median income for a family was $52,566. Males had a median income of $39,516 versus $25,577 for females. The per capita income for the township was $18,075. About 4.7% of families and 5.6% of the population were below the poverty line, including 6.1% of those under age 18 and 9.7% of those age 65 or over.

== Notable people ==
- William Porter, track and field athlete, Olympic gold medalist in 1948
