= North Plains =

North Plains may refer to:

- North Plains Township, Michigan
- North Plains, Oregon
