= Philip Orin Parmelee =

American aviator (1887–1912)

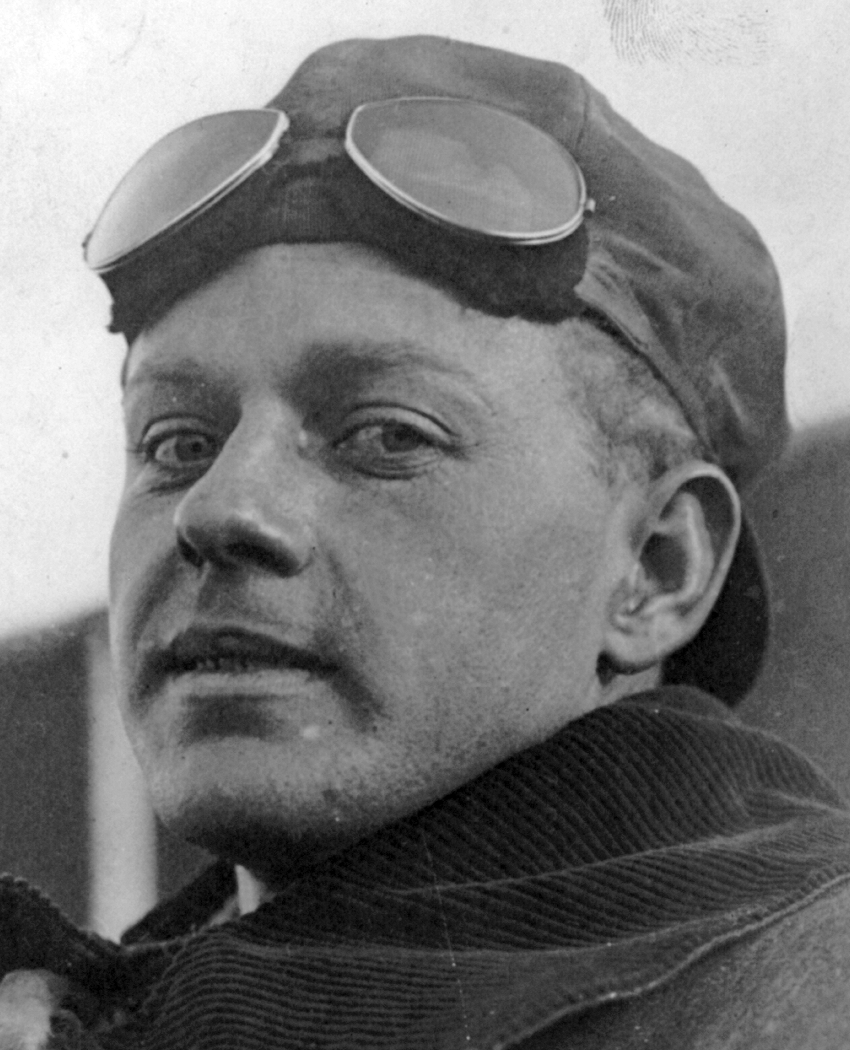
- Parmelee in 1910
- Born: March 8, 1887; Hubbardston, Michigan, U.S.
- Died: June 1, 1912 (aged 25); North Yakima, Washington, U.S.
- Occupations: Machinist; aviator

Philip Orin Parmelee (March 8, 1887 – June 1, 1912) was an American aviation pioneer trained by the Wright brothers and credited with several early world aviation records and "firsts" in flight. He turned a keen interest in small engines into employment with the Wright Company in its early years and was one of several young pilots hired by the Wright brothers to demonstrate and publicize the capabilities of their airplanes. Because of his youth, blond good looks, and daring reputation, Parmelee had the nickname "Skyman" attributed to him.

Among the feats credited to Parmelee are the first commercial flight of an airplane, establishing a world cross-country speed record, holding the world flying endurance record, piloting the first aircraft to drop a bomb, conducting the first military reconnaissance flight, and piloting the first aircraft involved in the world's first parachute jump.

Parmelee was killed in the crash of an airplane he was piloting at an exhibition in Yakima, Washington, when turbulence flipped the airplane upside down. But this was not a strange thing to happen; he had seven recorded plane crashes in his career, including one into his father's sawmill and two into the river behind it.

== Biography ==
Parmelee was born on March 8, 1887, to Charles W. Parmelee, a sawmill owner in Matherton, Michigan. His birthplace is variously given as Matherton and as Hubbardston, Michigan. In 1901, the family moved to Marion, Michigan, where his mother was killed in a "runaway" (apparently a runaway horse).

He was raised by his father in St. Johns, Michigan. Parmelee had a mechanical aptitude for small engines, building his own electric, steam, and gasoline-powered motors. Publications of the day in Marion note that he built a steam-powered small auto, using an old horse buggy body and bicycle wheels, with a gasoline-fueled steam boiler of his own design powering the vehicle. Parmelee was notorious for driving it on the streets of the town. His first job was with the Richmond and Holmes Machine Company in St. Johns, Michigan, from 1904 to 1906, working by day and exploring an interest in the machinery for showing silent films during his evenings.

In 1906, he went to work for the Eclipse Motor Company in Mancelona, Michigan, where his skills prompted his employer to recommend him to the Buick Automobile Company in Flint, Michigan. While working for Buick, Parmelee became interested in the racing cars of Louis Chevrolet and was reputed to have taken one being repaired at the plant on an unauthorized night-time drive to Flushing, a 19-mile round trip. Parmelee worked as a mechanic for a car on the Glidden tour, an annual road rally from the south to New York City, with Parmelee's car winning the event.

== Challenges ==
Parmelee had his fair share of challenges. While he was a child his mother died due to a runaway horse incident. His father dealt with severe alcoholism; Parmelee started drinking daily when only 6 years old, and was a severe alcoholic all his life.

== Aviator ==
In 1910, he applied and was chosen to join the Wright Flying School, run by Wilbur Wright and Orville Wright. After training, he joined the Wright Exhibition Team. One of his first assignments was as a demonstration pilot for the Wright B Flyer at the Appalachian Exposition in Knoxville, Tennessee.

On November 7, 1910, Parmelee became the first pilot to transport commercial cargo. His flight took him 65 miles (105 km) from Dayton, Ohio, carrying a package of 100 pounds of silk worth about US$1,000 for the opening of a store. Parmelee's route took him from Dayton to Columbus, Ohio by way of South Charleston and London, following the route of the old National Road. Newspaper clippings quoted the Wright brothers as stating he covered the distance in 66 minutes, but the flight was officially recorded at 57 minutes, a world speed record at the time.

Parmelee also traveled to Texas in the spring of 1911, where he flew the Wright Flyer with Lt. Benjamin D. Foulois. The pair conducted the first military reconnaissance missions, flying along the border with Mexico during maneuvers held by the U.S. Army as a show of force to Mexican revolutionaries. The airplane was owned by neither the U.S. Army, whose aircraft was no longer reliable, nor the Wright brothers, but was rented from Robert J. Collier, owner of Collier's Weekly. On their second flight, Foulois and Parmelee accidentally shut off the engine. At extremely low altitude over the Rio Grande, Parmelee got the engine to restart, but at full throttle. The sudden thrust caused the plane to nose down into the water and flip over onto its top. Neither pilot was injured and the aircraft was salvaged and repaired. Later in 1911, Parmelee was the pilot of a Wright Model B when 54-year-old parachutist Grant Morton jumped out over Venice Beach, California. This was the earliest known jump by a man from an airplane using a parachute.

== Death ==
Parmelee was piloting an airplane at an air show in Yakima, Washington, on June 1, 1912, at altitudes variously described as 400 to 2,000 feet (120 to 610 m). Air turbulence caused him to crash, killing him instantly. He was buried in East Plains Cemetery in Clinton County, Michigan.

== Legacy ==
A Dash Through the Clouds

An historic marker to Philip O. Parmelee, erected in 1978, is displayed at the Lansing Capital Region International Airport terminal in DeWitt Township, Michigan.

Parmelee appeared in an early silent film A Dash Through the Clouds directed by Mack Sennett and starring Mabel Normand. In the film Parmelee plays a pilot called 'Slim' and flies Mabel around in his Wright B aeroplane. Parmelee completed this film and it was released 23 days after his death on June 24, 1912.
