= Lebanon Township, Michigan =

- Civil township
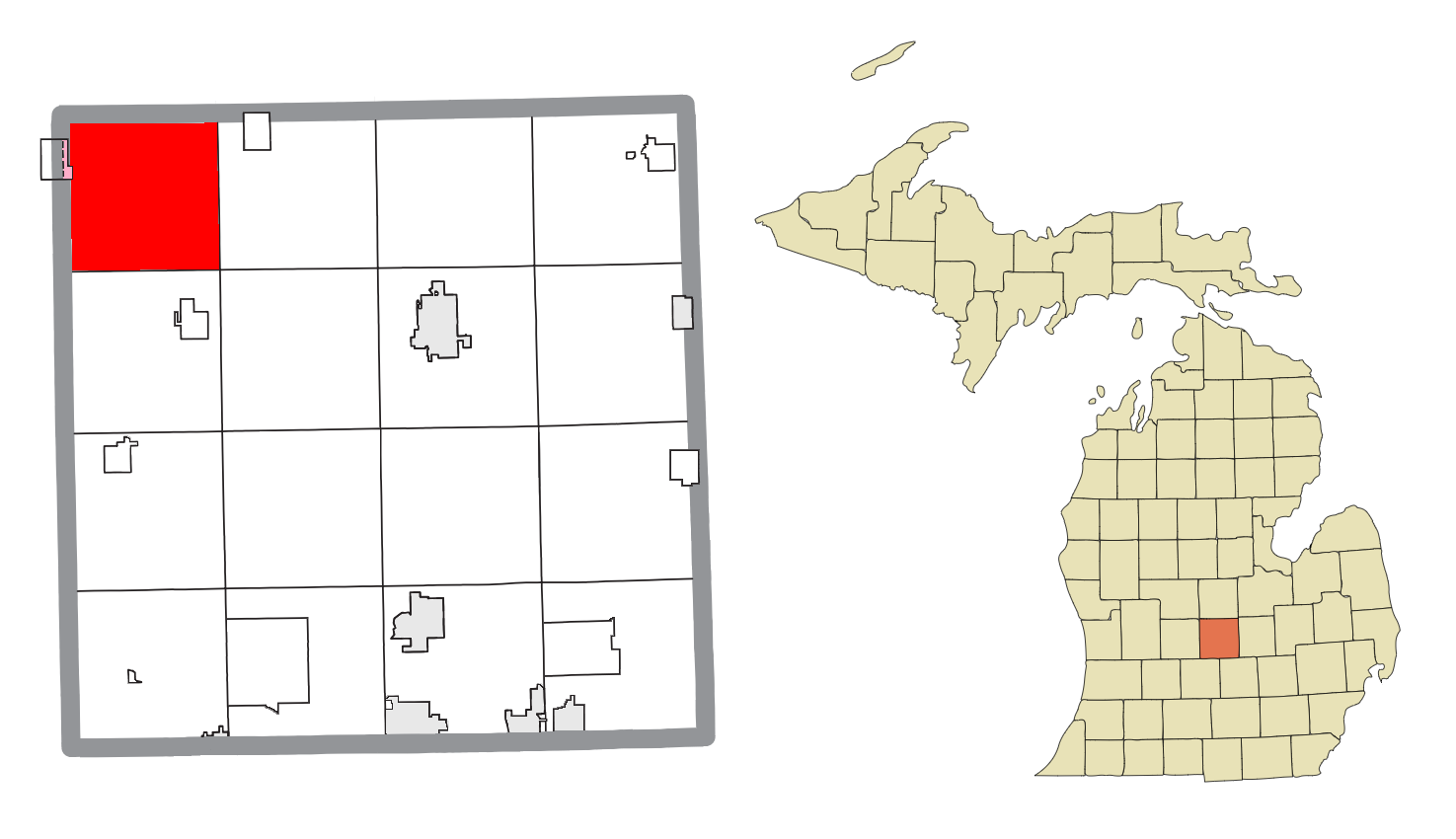
- Location within Clinton County (red) and an administered portion of the village of Hubbardston (pink)

- Location within the state of Michigan Location within the United States
- Coordinates: 43°04′18″N 84°47′28″W
- Country: United States
- State: Michigan
- County: Clinton

Government
  - Supervisor: Gregory Armbrustmacher
  - Clerk: Daniel Smith

Area
  - Total: 35.40 sq mi (91.69 km^{2})
  - Land: 35.10 sq mi (90.91 km^{2})
  - Water: 0.30 sq mi (0.78 km^{2})
- Elevation: 646 ft (197 m)

Population (2020)
  - Total: 597
  - Density: 17.0/sq mi (6.57/km^{2})
- Time zone: UTC-5 (Eastern (EST))
  - Summer (DST): UTC-4 (EDT)
- ZIP code(s): 48835 (Fowler); 48845 (Hubbardston); 48873 (Pewamo)
- Area code: 989
- FIPS code: 26-46580
- GNIS feature ID: 1626597

Lebanon Township is a civil township of Clinton County in the U.S. state of Michigan. The population was 597 at the 2020 census.

== Communities ==
- Hubbardston is a village partially located within Lebanon Township. The majority of the village is across the county line in North Plains Township in Ionia County to the west.
- Matherton is an unincorporated community just south of Hubbardston along the county line at 43°04′06″N 84°50′13″W.

== Geography ==
According to the U.S. Census Bureau, the township has a total area of 35.40 square miles (91.69 km^{2}), of which 35.10 square miles (90.91 km^{2}) is land and 0.30 square miles (0.78 km^{2}) (0.85%) is water.

Lebanon Township occupies the northwest corner of Clinton County and is bordered by Ionia County to the west and Gratiot County to the north. The Maple River, a tributary of the Grand River, flows across the northern part of the township from east to west. The township contains portions of the Maple River State Game Area.

== Demographics ==
As of the census of 2000, there were 705 people, 219 households, and 183 families residing in the township. The population density was 19.9 inhabitants per square mile (7.7/km^{2}). There were 225 housing units at an average density of 6.4 per square mile (2.5/km^{2}). The racial makeup of the township was 99.72% White, 0.14% Native American, and 0.14% from two or more races. Hispanic or Latino of any race were 0.43% of the population.

There were 219 households, out of which 44.7% had children under the age of 18 living with them, 74.0% were married couples living together, 5.5% had a female householder with no husband present, and 16.0% were non-families. 14.2% of all households were made up of individuals, and 6.4% had someone living alone who was 65 years of age or older. The average household size was 3.22 and the average family size was 3.59.

In the township the population was spread out, with 35.3% under the age of 18, 7.7% from 18 to 24, 26.5% from 25 to 44, 21.4% from 45 to 64, and 9.1% who were 65 years of age or older. The median age was 33 years. For every 100 females, there were 113.6 males. For every 100 females age 18 and over, there were 113.1 males.

The median income for a household in the township was $52,500, and the median income for a family was $53,854. Males had a median income of $40,833 versus $26,538 for females. The per capita income for the township was $16,640. About 6.7% of families and 7.4% of the population were below the poverty line, including 4.8% of those under age 18 and 16.1% of those age 65 or over.
