= Elba Township, Gratiot County, Michigan =

Elba Township, Michigan
- Civil township
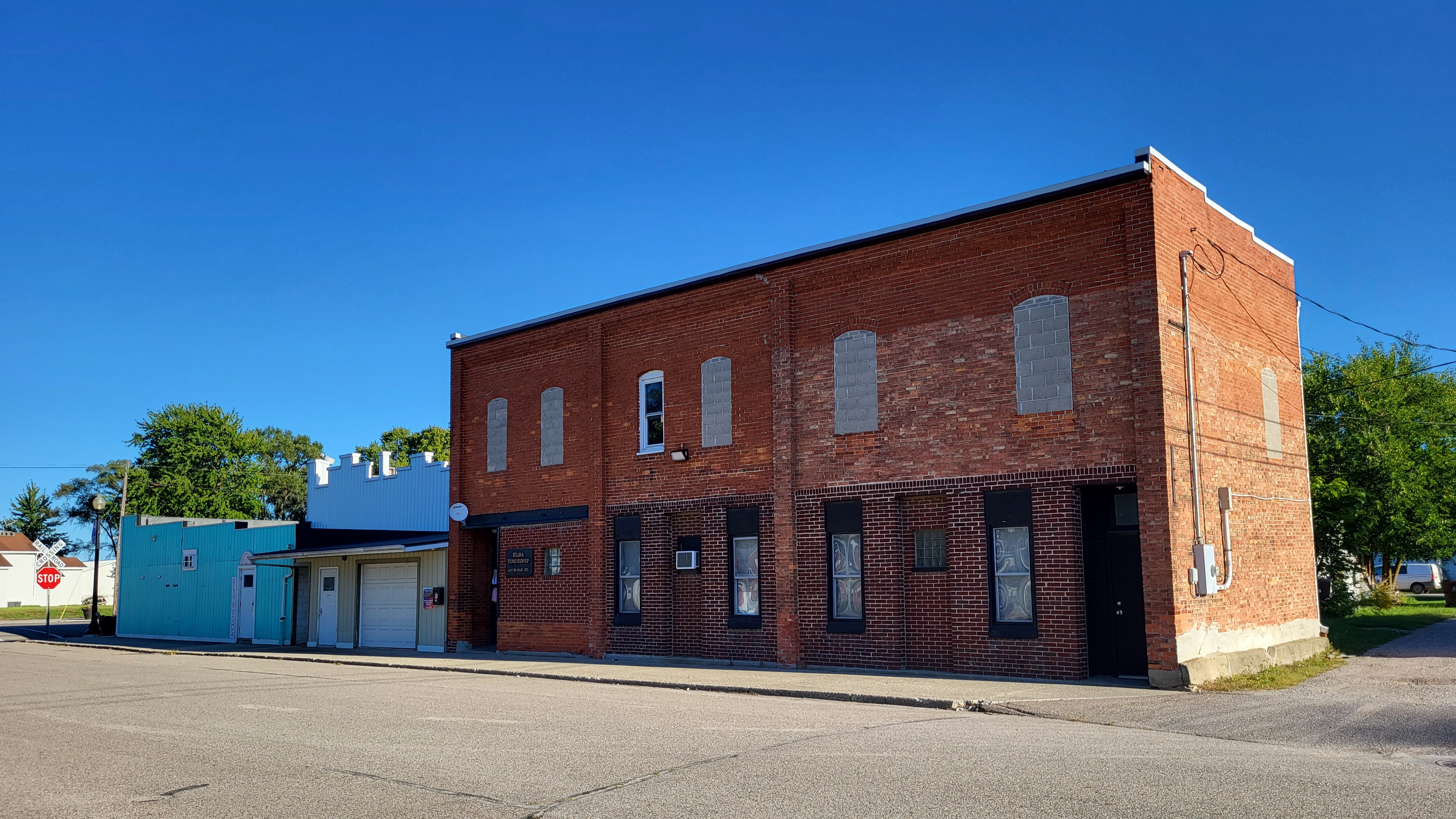
- Elba Township Offices in Ashley

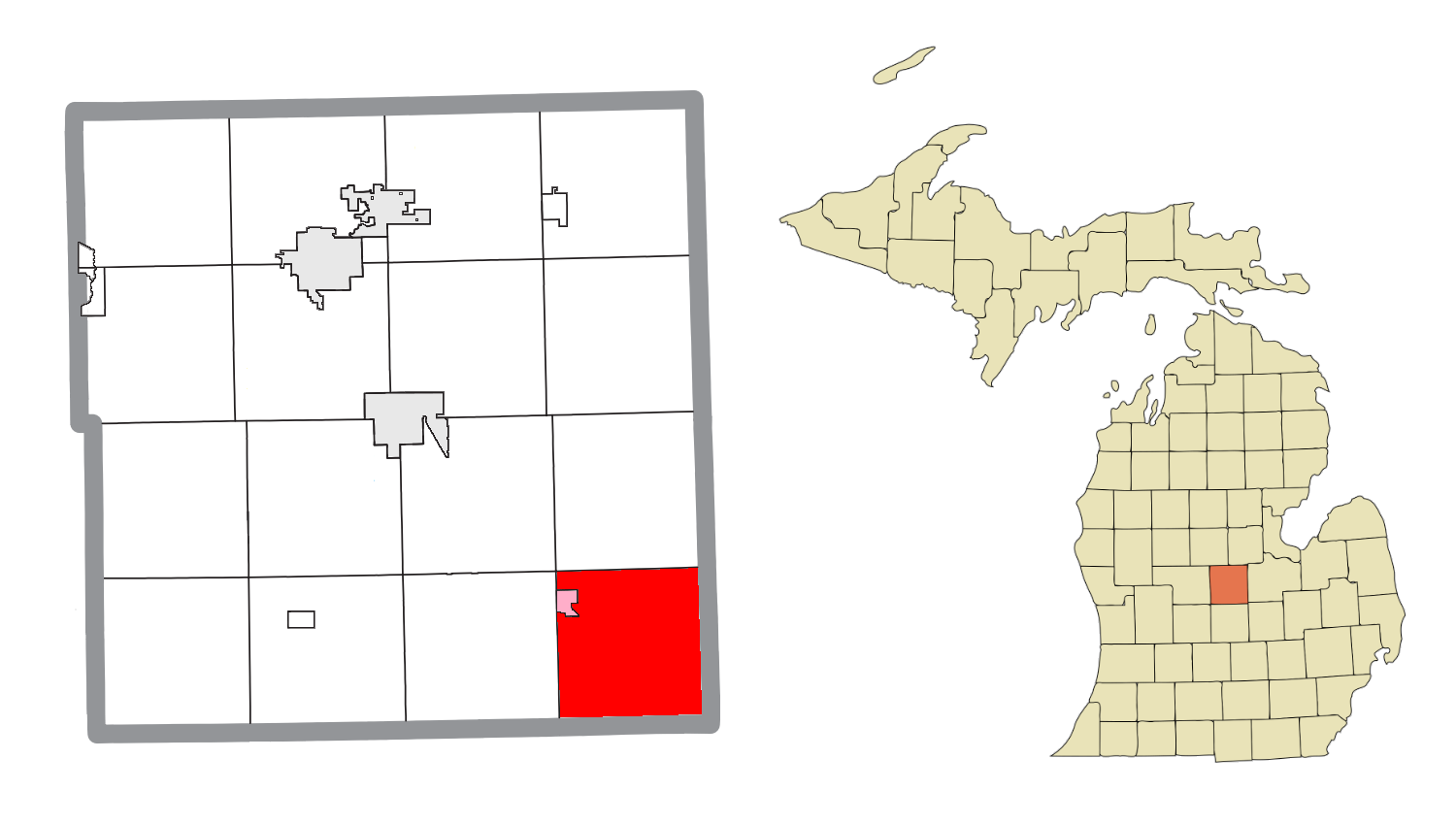
- Location within Gratiot County (red) and the administered village of Ashley (pink)

- Location within the state of Michigan Location within the United States
- Coordinates: 43°09′54″N 84°26′16″W
- Country: United States
- State: Michigan
- County: Gratiot
- Established: 1856

Area
  - Total: 35.1 sq mi (91.0 km^{2})
  - Land: 35.1 sq mi (91.0 km^{2})
  - Water: 0 sq mi (0.0 km^{2})
- Elevation: 660 ft (200 m)

Population (2020)
  - Total: 1,293
  - Density: 36.8/sq mi (14.2/km^{2})
- Time zone: UTC-5 (Eastern (EST))
  - Summer (DST): UTC-4 (EDT)
- FIPS code: 26-25120
- GNIS feature ID: 1626221
- Website: https://www.elbagratiot.com/

Elba Township is a civil township of Gratiot County in the U.S. state of Michigan. The population was 1,293 at the 2020 census.

== Communities ==
- The village of Ashley is in the northeast corner of the township.
- Bannister is an unincorporated community located in the southeast corner of the township, situated on the Maple River at 43°07′57″N 84°25′19″W. The ZIP code is 48807. A post office was established here in 1883.

== History ==
Elba Township was established in 1856.

== Geography ==
According to the United States Census Bureau, the township has a total area of 35.1 square miles (91 km^{2}), all land. The township contains portions of the Maple River State Game Area.

== Demographics ==
As of the census of 2000, there were 1,394 people, 526 households, and 389 families residing in the township. The population density was 39.7 inhabitants per square mile (15.3/km^{2}). There were 557 housing units at an average density of 15.9 per square mile (6.1/km^{2}). The racial makeup of the township was 98.13% White, 0.29% African American, 0.22% Native American, 0.07% Asian, 0.50% from other races, and 0.79% from two or more races. Hispanic or Latino of any race were 1.43% of the population.

There were 526 households, out of which 32.3% had children under the age of 18 living with them, 59.9% were married couples living together, 8.4% had a female householder with no husband present, and 25.9% were non-families. 23.2% of all households were made up of individuals, and 11.6% had someone living alone who was 65 years of age or older. The average household size was 2.57 and the average family size was 3.00.

In the township the population was spread out, with 24.8% under the age of 18, 8.2% from 18 to 24, 28.1% from 25 to 44, 21.5% from 45 to 64, and 17.4% who were 65 years of age or older. The median age was 37 years. For every 100 females, there were 99.1 males. For every 100 females age 18 and over, there were 94.1 males.

The median income for a household in the township was $35,650, and the median income for a family was $41,786. Males had a median income of $35,326 versus $22,105 for females. The per capita income for the township was $18,323. About 8.0% of families and 13.4% of the population were below the poverty line, including 17.8% of those under age 18 and 12.9% of those age 65 or over.
