= Hubbardston =

Hubbardston is the name of two towns in the United States:

- Hubbardston, Massachusetts
- Hubbardston, Michigan

== See also ==
- Hubbardton, Vermont
