= River Styx (Gratiot County, Michigan) =

Location
- Country: United States

Physical characteristics
- Source
  - location: New Haven Township, Gratiot County, Michigan
  - coordinates: 43.26392°N 84.7825°W
- Mouth
  - location: Pine Creek, Gratiot County, Michigan
  - coordinates: 43.22447°N 84.68361°W
- Length: 8 mi (13 km)
- Basin size: 6.73 mi^{2} (17.4 km^{2})
- Discharge
  - location: mouth
  - average: 5.91 cu ft/s (0.167 m^{3}/s) (estimate)

The River Styx is an 8-mile-long (13 km) tributary of Pine Creek in Gratiot County, Michigan, in the United States. Its water flows via Pine Creek, the Maple River, and the Grand River to Lake Michigan.

== See also ==
- List of rivers of Michigan
