= Ashley, Michigan =

- Village
- Village of Ashley
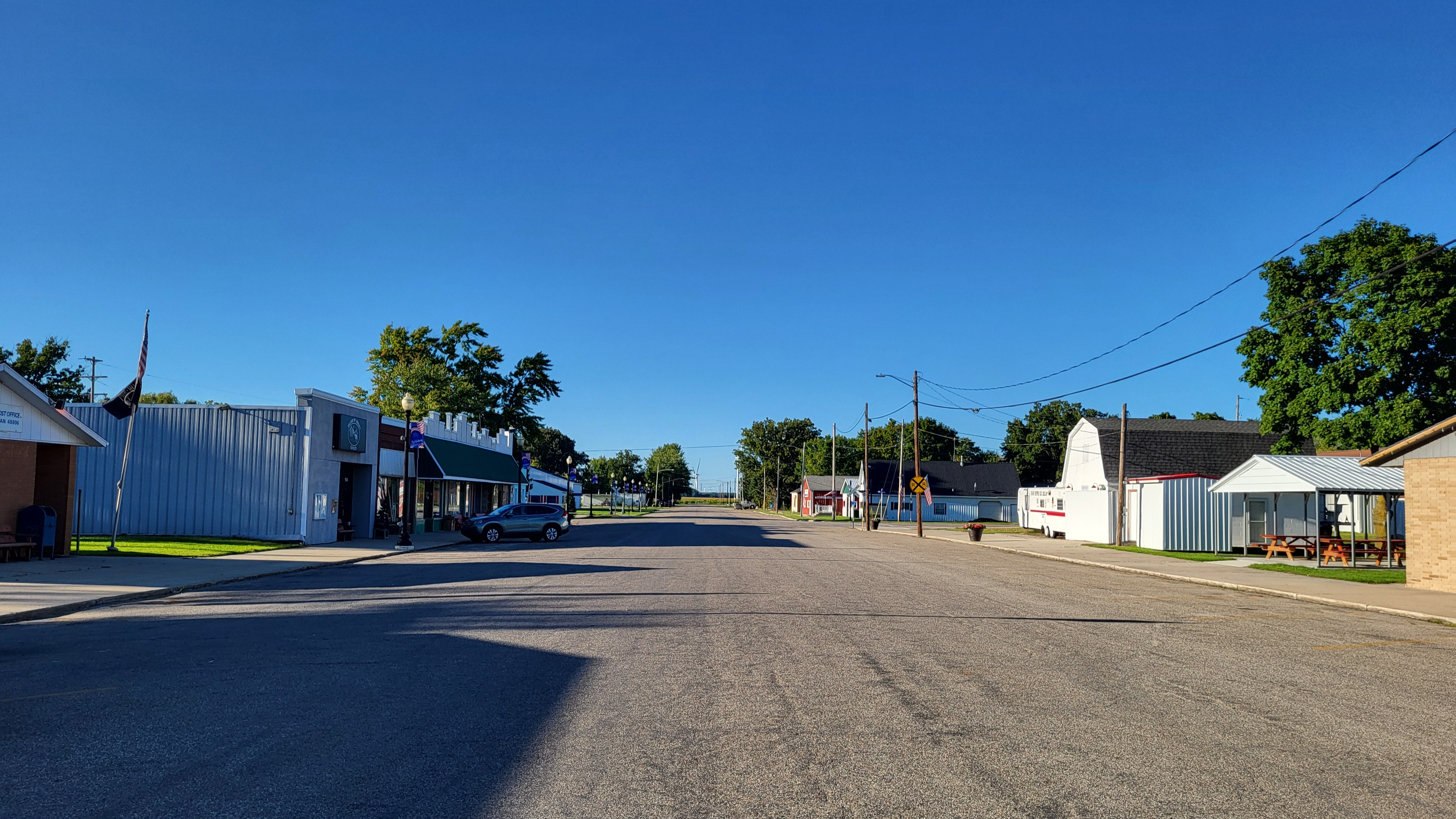
- Looking north along S. Sterling Street

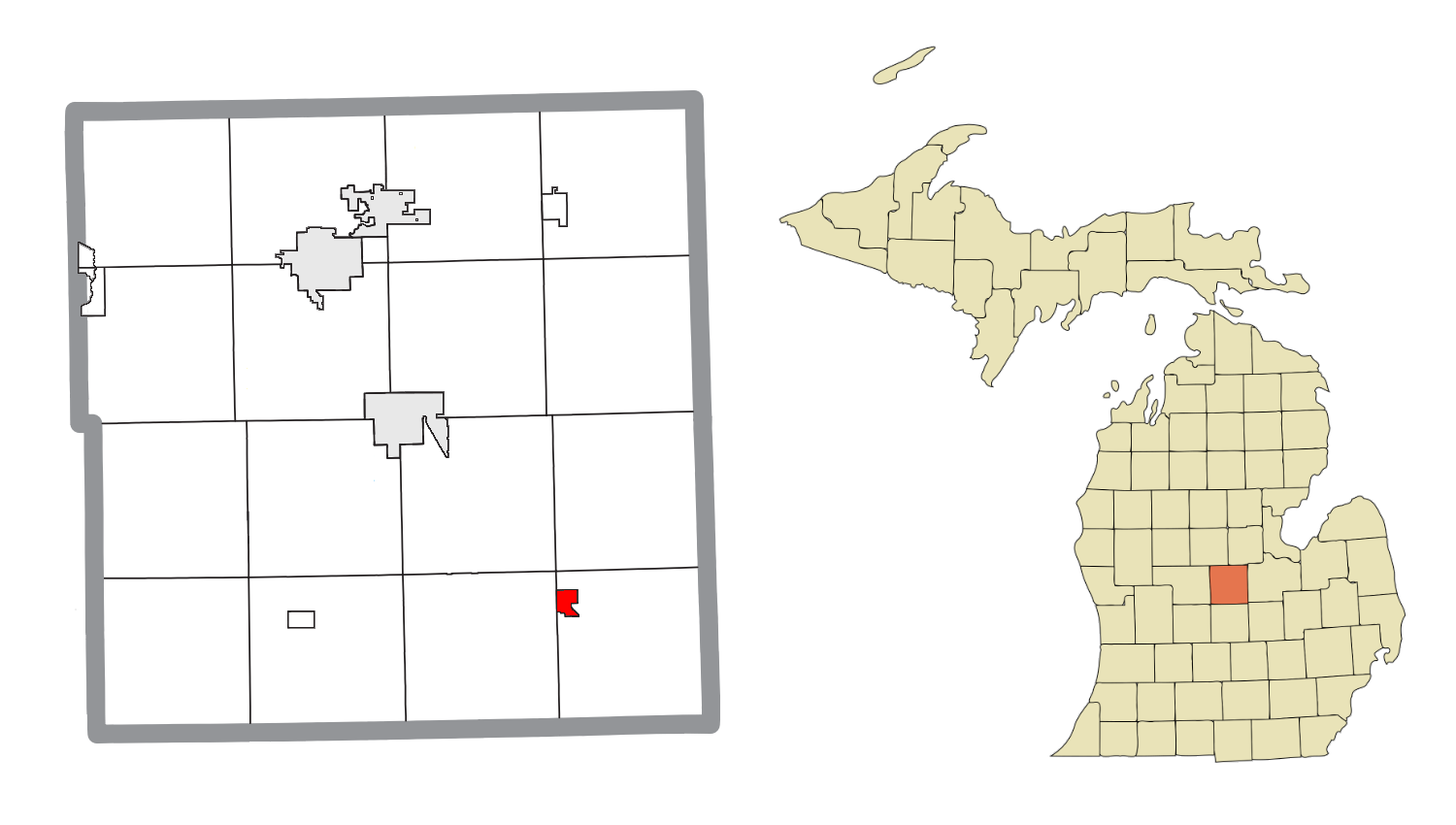
- Location within Gratiot County

- Location within the state of Michigan Location within the United States
- Coordinates: 43°11′16″N 84°28′35″W
- Country: United States
- State: Michigan
- County: Gratiot
- Township: Elba
- Settled: 1883
- Incorporated: 1887

Area
  - Total: 0.68 sq mi (1.77 km^{2})
  - Land: 0.67 sq mi (1.74 km^{2})
  - Water: 0.012 sq mi (0.03 km^{2})
- Elevation: 669 ft (204 m)

Population (2020)
  - Total: 508
  - Density: 757.8/sq mi (292.57/km^{2})
- Time zone: UTC-5 (Eastern (EST))
  - Summer (DST): UTC-4 (EDT)
- ZIP code(s): 48806
- Area code: 989
- FIPS code: 26-03740
- GNIS feature ID: 2397997
- Website: Official website

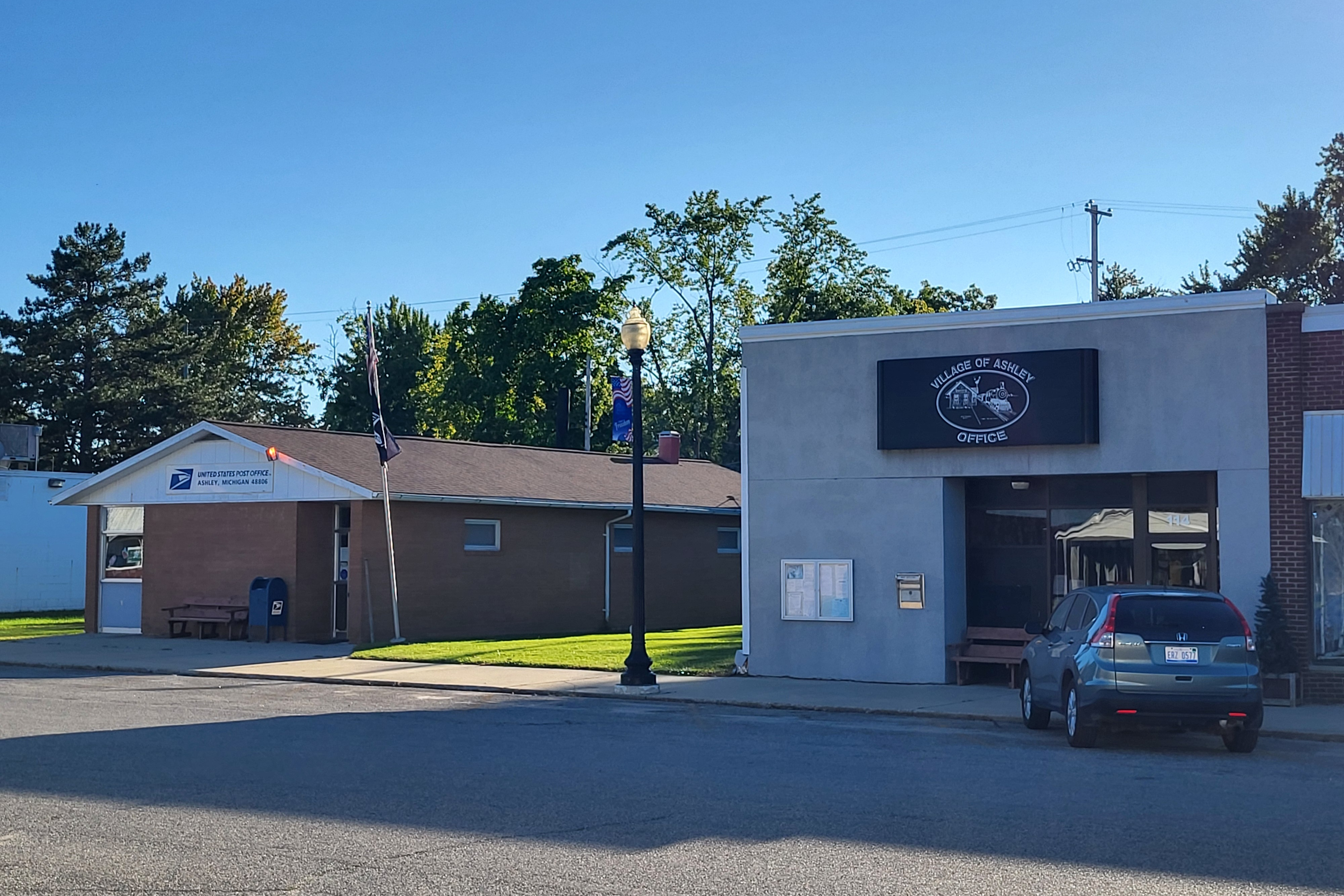
Post office and village office

Ashley is a village in Gratiot County in the U.S. state of Michigan. The population was 508 at the 2020 census. The village is located in the northwest corner of Elba Township. No major state trunkline runs through the village, although M-57 passes within one mile to the south. Ashley was platted in 1884.

== Geography ==
According to the United States Census Bureau, the village has a total area of 0.64 square miles (1.66 km^{2}), all land.

== Demographics ==
Historical population
Census	Pop.	Note	%±
1890	711		—
1900	617		−13.2%
1910	513		−16.9%
1920	596		16.2%
1930	419		−29.7%
1940	466		11.2%
1950	449		−3.6%
1960	448		−0.2%
1970	521		16.3%
1980	570		9.4%
1990	518		−9.1%
2000	526		1.5%
2010	563		7.0%
2020	508		−9.8%
U.S. Decennial Census

=== 2010 census ===
As of the census of 2010, there were 563 people, 195 households, and 133 families living in the village. The population density was 879.7 inhabitants per square mile (339.7/km^{2}). There were 221 housing units at an average density of 345.3 per square mile (133.3/km^{2}). The racial makeup of the village was 97.9% White, 1.1% African American, 0.2% Asian, 0.7% from other races, and 0.2% from two or more races. Hispanic or Latino of any race were 3.2% of the population.

There were 195 households, of which 33.8% had children under the age of 18 living with them, 49.2% were married couples living together, 13.3% had a female householder with no husband present, 5.6% had a male householder with no wife present, and 31.8% were non-families. 27.7% of all households were made up of individuals, and 11.2% had someone living alone who was 65 years of age or older. The average household size was 2.51 and the average family size was 2.98.

The median age in the village was 41.3 years. 24.9% of residents were under the age of 18; 5.8% were between the ages of 18 and 24; 23.6% were from 25 to 44; 24.3% were from 45 to 64; and 21.3% were 65 years of age or older. The gender makeup of the village was 45.8% male and 54.2% female.

=== 2000 census ===
As of the census of 2000, there were 526 people, 193 households, and 141 families living in the village. The population density was 815.9 inhabitants per square mile (315.0/km^{2}). There were 206 housing units at an average density of 319.5 per square mile (123.4/km^{2}). The racial makeup of the village was 99.24% White, 0.38% African American, 0.19% from other races, and 0.19% from two or more races. Hispanic or Latino of any race were 0.38% of the population.

There were 193 households, out of which 33.7% had children under the age of 18 living with them, 56.5% were married couples living together, 9.3% had a female householder with no husband present, and 26.9% were non-families. 23.3% of all households were made up of individuals, and 11.9% had someone living alone who was 65 years of age or older. The average household size was 2.51 and the average family size was 2.91.

In the village, the population was spread out, with 22.6% under the age of 18, 11.0% from 18 to 24, 24.3% from 25 to 44, 21.5% from 45 to 64, and 20.5% who were 65 years of age or older. The median age was 38 years. For every 100 females, there were 98.5 males. For every 100 females age 18 and over, there were 85.0 males.

The median income for a household in the village was $32,917, and the median income for a family was $35,833. Males had a median income of $33,125 versus $19,500 for females. The per capita income for the village was $15,714. About 10.8% of families and 14.1% of the population were below the poverty line, including 16.4% of those under age 18 and 23.5% of those age 65 or over.
