= Pine Creek (Maple River tributary) =

Pine Creek (Maple River)

Location
- Country: United States

Physical characteristics
- Source
  - location: Newark Township, Gratiot County, Michigan
  - coordinates: 43.27697°N 84.64083°W
- Mouth
  - location: Maple River, Clinton County, Michigan
  - coordinates: 43.10919°N 84.69305°W
- Length: 19.6 mi (31.5 km)
- Discharge
  - location: mouth
  - average: 71.87 cu ft/s (2.035 m^{3}/s) (estimate)

Basin features
- Tributaries
  - right: River Styx

Pine Creek is a 19.6-mile-long (31.5 km) tributary of the Maple River in Gratiot and Clinton counties in Michigan. Via the Maple River, the creek's output flows into the Grand River and then into Lake Michigan.

== See also ==
- List of rivers of Michigan
