= Maple River State Game Area =

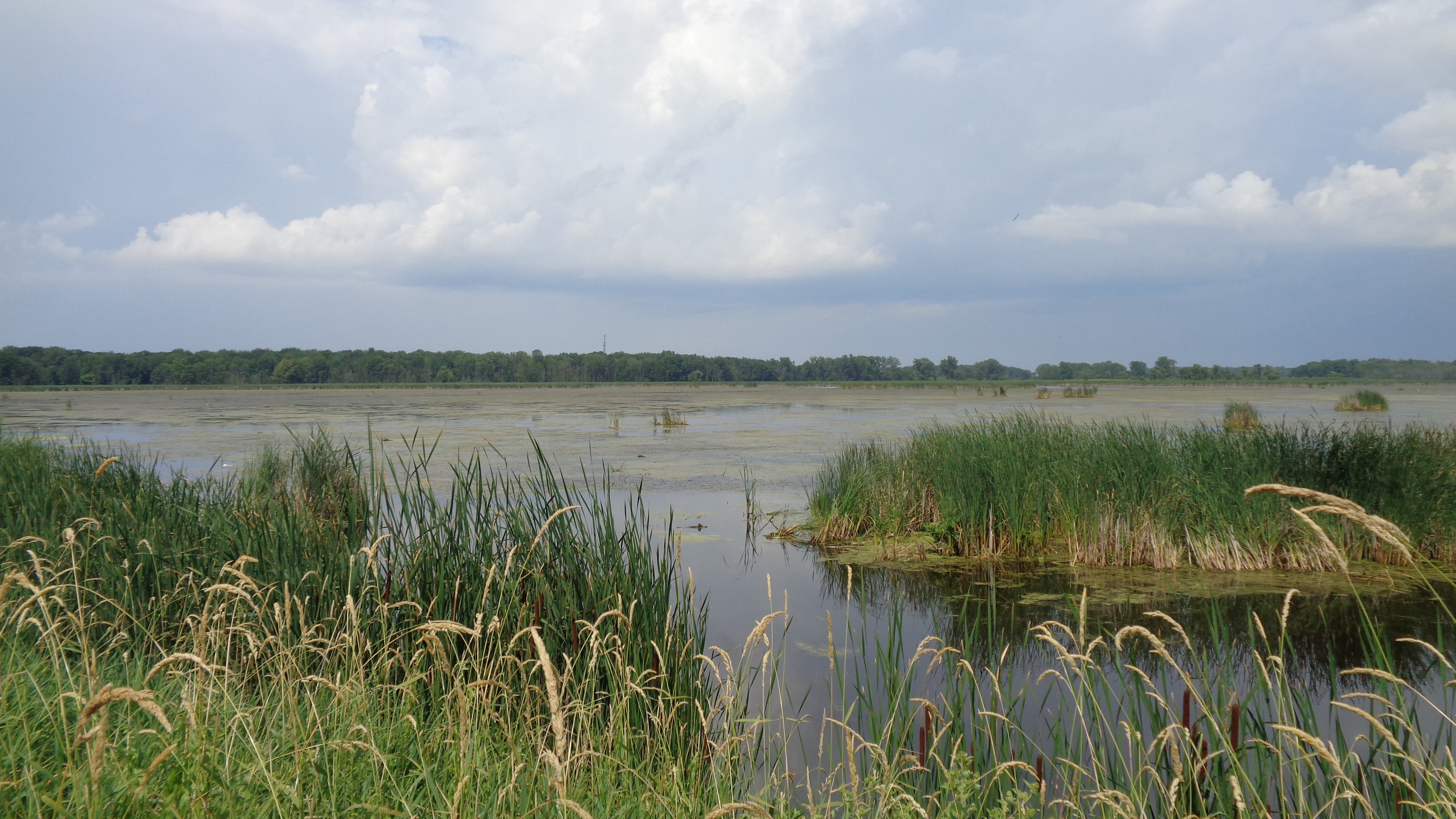
- Maple River Flooding near U.S. Route 127

- Location within Michigan Location within the United States
- Location: Clinton, Gratiot, and Ionia counties Michigan, United States
- Nearest city: St. Johns, Michigan
- Coordinates: 43°07′10″N 84°39′56″W
- Area: 9,252 acres (3,744 ha)
- Named for: Maple River
- Governing body: Michigan Department of Natural Resources

The Maple River State Game Area is a protected state game area in the U.S. state of Michigan. Located in the central region of the Lower Peninsula, it encompasses approximately 9,252 acres (3,744 ha) in segmented portions within Clinton, Gratiot, and Ionia counties. Governed by the Michigan Department of Natural Resources, the area is considered the state's longest contiguous wetland complex.

The game area contains the only known salt marsh (classified as an inland salt marsh) in the state of Michigan.

== Location ==
The Maple River State Game Area follows the Maple River and several smaller creeks for a distance of approximately 16 miles (26 km) and a total area of 9,252 acres (3,744 ha). Its easternmost sections lies within Elba Township in Gratiot County and also contains areas in the county to the west in Washington Township and Fulton Township. Going southwest, the game area contains portions of Lebanon Township and Essex Township within Clinton County. A small isolated portion denotes the westernmost portion of the game area within Lyons Township in Ionia County.

The area once contained numerous industrial factories and small settlements, but most have disappeared over time. The only incorporated settlement located directly within the state game area is the small village of Maple Rapids in Essex Township. In Washington Township, U.S. Highway 127 (US 127) passes through the area with a large marshland on both sides. The artificially created marshland is referred to as the Maple River Flooding. The city of St. Johns is to the south on US 127, and Ithaca is to the north. No other major roadways pass through the area, although there are numerous local roads and bridges.

The state game area's headquarters are located within the Rose Lake State Wildlife Research Area in Bath Charter Township about 35 miles (56 km) to the southeast. At 16,684 acres (6,752 ha), the larger Gratiot–Saginaw State Game Area is located about 10 miles (16 km) to the northeast in Gratiot and Saginaw counties. The two are loosely connected by the small Maple River / Gratiot–Saginaw Connector State Game Area, which intends to connect the two areas into one continuous state game area.

== Wildlife ==
The Maple River State Game Area has a diverse environment consisting of old forests, wetlands, and grasslands centered along the Maple River. The game area is noted for its large bird populations, as well as an abundance of rabbits, turtles, deer, possums, coyotes, turkeys, snakes, and numerous rodents, such as muskrats, porcupines, squirrels, chipmunks, and beavers. The Friends of the Maple River—a citizen organization aimed at promoting the river—notes a small presence of reintroduced black bears. The Maple River is also a popular fishing destination. The river includes many common fish, including black crappie, bluegill, smallmouth and largemouth bass, northern pike, pumpkinseed, rock bass, yellow perch, bullhead and channel catfish, and bowfin. The Maple River is dammed in several locations, but none are within the river's course in the state game area.

Water levels along the river and surrounding wetlands have started to dry up in recent years, leading to a sharp drop in the number of some animals. From 2010 to 2015, the area underwent an extensive restoration project to improve the depleting wetlands to provide a more hospitable animal refuge to accommodate increasing animal populations. The project increased water levels through a new water pumping system, upgraded miles of levees and hiking paths, and built boat launches for river access. The project was supported by a grant from the U.S. Fish and Wildlife Service with contributions from Ducks Unlimited.

=== Birds ===
The Maple River State Game Area is popular among numerous bird species as a living or breeding environment. The following is a list of known bird species within the state game area, according to the National Audubon Society.

- Bald eagle
- Bobolink
- Canada goose
- Caspian tern
- Great blue heron
- Great egret
- Green heron
- Least sandpiper
- Lesser yellowlegs
- Marsh wren
- Northern harrier
- Osprey
- Pectoral sandpiper
- Ring-necked duck
- Rough-legged hawk
- Rusty blackbird
- Sandhill crane
- Semipalmated sandpiper
- Short-billed dowitcher
- Short-eared owl
- Solitary sandpiper
- Sora
- Trumpeter swan
- Tundra swan
- Wood duck

According to Birdwatching Magazine, the great horned owl, least bittern, prothonotary warbler, red-headed woodpecker, red-tailed hawk, and "the vast majority of Michigan's inland ducks" can also be found within the state game area. Even rarer species of birds can be found, including Hudsonian godwit, Eurasian wigeon, snowy egret, and king rail.

== Activities ==
The Maple River State Game Area is a popular fishing destination along the Maple River. Navigating the river is most suited for smaller vessels, such as canoes and kayaks. While it provides numerous shore fishing locations, there are four public access boat ramps along the river: Maple Road in Fulton Township, Dean Road in Washington Township, and two in Lebanon Township (French Road and Fitzpatrick Road).

As a state game area, camping in non-designated areas is prohibited. The only public campground within Maple River State Game Area is the privately owned Maple River Campground in Lebanon Township in the southwestern portion along the Maple River. Numerous parking lots are dotted throughout the game area for day use. Seasonal hunting is permitted in various locations of the park, and common game include deer hunting, waterfowl hunting, turkey hunting, and small game trapping. Fishing is permitted year round. A small section within Washington Township east of US 127 is designated as a wildlife refuge, prohibits hunting, and is only accessible at certain times of the year (off limits from September 1 to December 1). Hiking, birdwatching, and photography are also popular activities. The game area includes several miles of marked trails.
