= A Dash Through the Clouds =

- Directed by: Mack Sennett
- Written by: Dell Henderson
- Produced by: Mack Sennett
- Starring: Mabel Normand; Fred Mace; Philip Parmelee
- Cinematography: Percy Higginson
- Production company: Biograph Company
- Distributed by: General Film Company
- Release date: June 24, 1912
- Running time: 12 minutes
- Country: United States
- Language: Silent (English title cards)

A Dash Through the Clouds is a 1912 short American silent comedy film directed by Mack Sennett, written by Dell Henderson and starring Mabel Normand. It has the distinction of being somewhat of an aviation film as Sennett employed the services of real life aviation pioneer, Philip Parmelee, a pilot for the Wright Brothers.

The film provided a means through which Parmelee is preserved, as he died in a crash not long after the making.

Sennett had a penchant for working with and showcasing real-life daredevils and public personalities and hired a real-life pilot, Phil Parmelee, who was a national hero at the time. He would employ Barney Oldfield in a similar fashion a year later in Barney Oldfield's Race for a Life.

The prints of the movie are included in the Library of Congress and the George Eastman Museum film archive.

== Cast ==
- Mabel Normand - Martha
- Fred Mace - Arthur (aka 'Chubby')
- Philip Parmelee - Slim, the aviator
- Sylvia Ashton - Carmelita, Young Mexican Woman
- Jack Pickford - Mexican boy who warns Chubby
- Kate Bruce - Old Mexican Woman

other cast

- William J. Butler - Townsman
- Edward Dillon - Carmelita's Objecting Relative
- Charles Gorman - Townsman
- Grace Henderson - Townswoman
- Harry Hyde - Townsman
- J. Jiquel Lanoe - Townsman
- Alfred Paget - Townsman
