= Washington Township, Gratiot County, Michigan =

Washington Township, Michigan
- Civil township
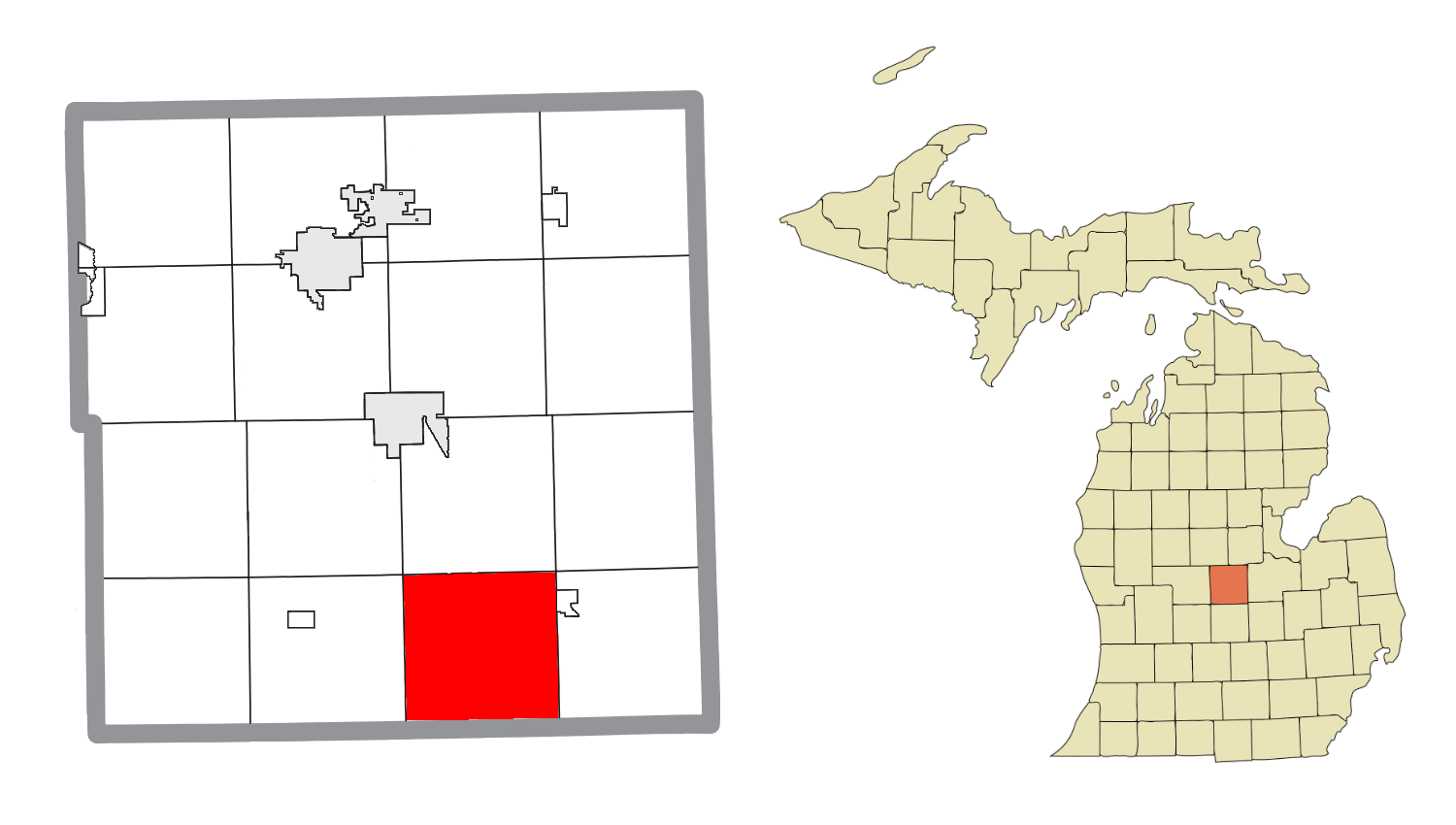
- Location within Gratiot County

- Location within the state of Michigan Location within the United States
- Coordinates: 43°9′32″N 84°32′18″W
- Country: United States
- State: Michigan
- County: Gratiot

Area
  - Total: 35.5 sq mi (91.9 km^{2})
  - Land: 35.4 sq mi (91.8 km^{2})
  - Water: 0.039 sq mi (0.1 km^{2})
- Elevation: 660 ft (200 m)

Population (2020)
  - Total: 813
  - Density: 22.9/sq mi (8.86/km^{2})
- Time zone: UTC-5 (Eastern (EST))
  - Summer (DST): UTC-4 (EDT)
- FIPS code: 26-84080
- GNIS feature ID: 1627215
- Website: https://www.washingtontwpgratiot.gov/

Washington Township is a civil township of Gratiot County in the U.S. state of Michigan. The population was 813 at the 2020 census.

== Geography ==
According to the United States Census Bureau, the township has a total area of 35.5 square miles (92 km^{2}), of which 35.4 square miles (92 km^{2}) is land and 0.04 square miles (0.10 km^{2}) (0.08%) is water. The township contains portions of the Maple River State Game Area.

== Demographics ==
As of the census of 2000, there were 909 people, 335 households, and 268 families residing in the township. The population density was 25.6 per square mile (9.9/km^{2}). There were 352 housing units at an average density of 9.9 per square mile (3.8/km^{2}). The racial makeup of the township was 98.13% White, 0.11% African American, 0.33% Native American, 0.22% Pacific Islander, 0.66% from other races, and 0.55% from two or more races. Hispanic or Latino of any race were 1.76% of the population.

There were 335 households, out of which 29.9% had children under the age of 18 living with them, 69.9% were married couples living together, 6.9% had a female householder with no husband present, and 20.0% were non-families. 17.3% of all households were made up of individuals, and 7.8% had someone living alone who was 65 years of age or older. The average household size was 2.71 and the average family size was 3.04.

In the township the population was spread out, with 22.9% under the age of 18, 9.1% from 18 to 24, 29.0% from 25 to 44, 25.4% from 45 to 64, and 13.5% who were 65 years of age or older. The median age was 39 years. For every 100 females, there were 102.4 males. For every 100 females age 18 and over, there were 98.6 males.

The median income for a household in the township was $40,958, and the median income for a family was $42,500. Males had a median income of $33,864 versus $26,528 for females. The per capita income for the township was $16,859. About 2.6% of families and 4.2% of the population were below the poverty line, including 4.7% of those under age 18 and 7.3% of those age 65 or over.
