= Maple Rapids, Michigan =

- Village
- Village of Maple Rapids
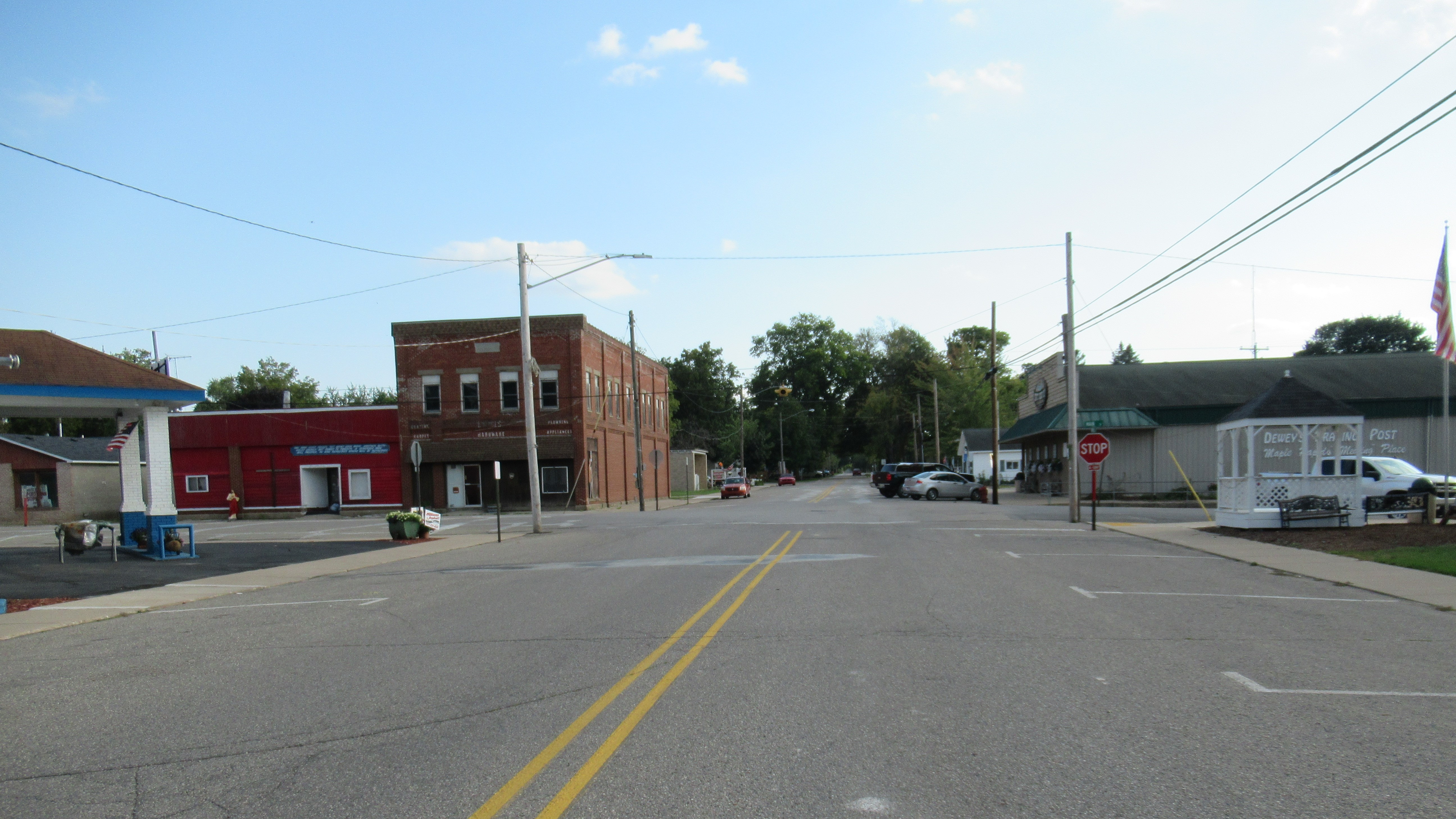
- Intersection of Main Street and Maple Avenue

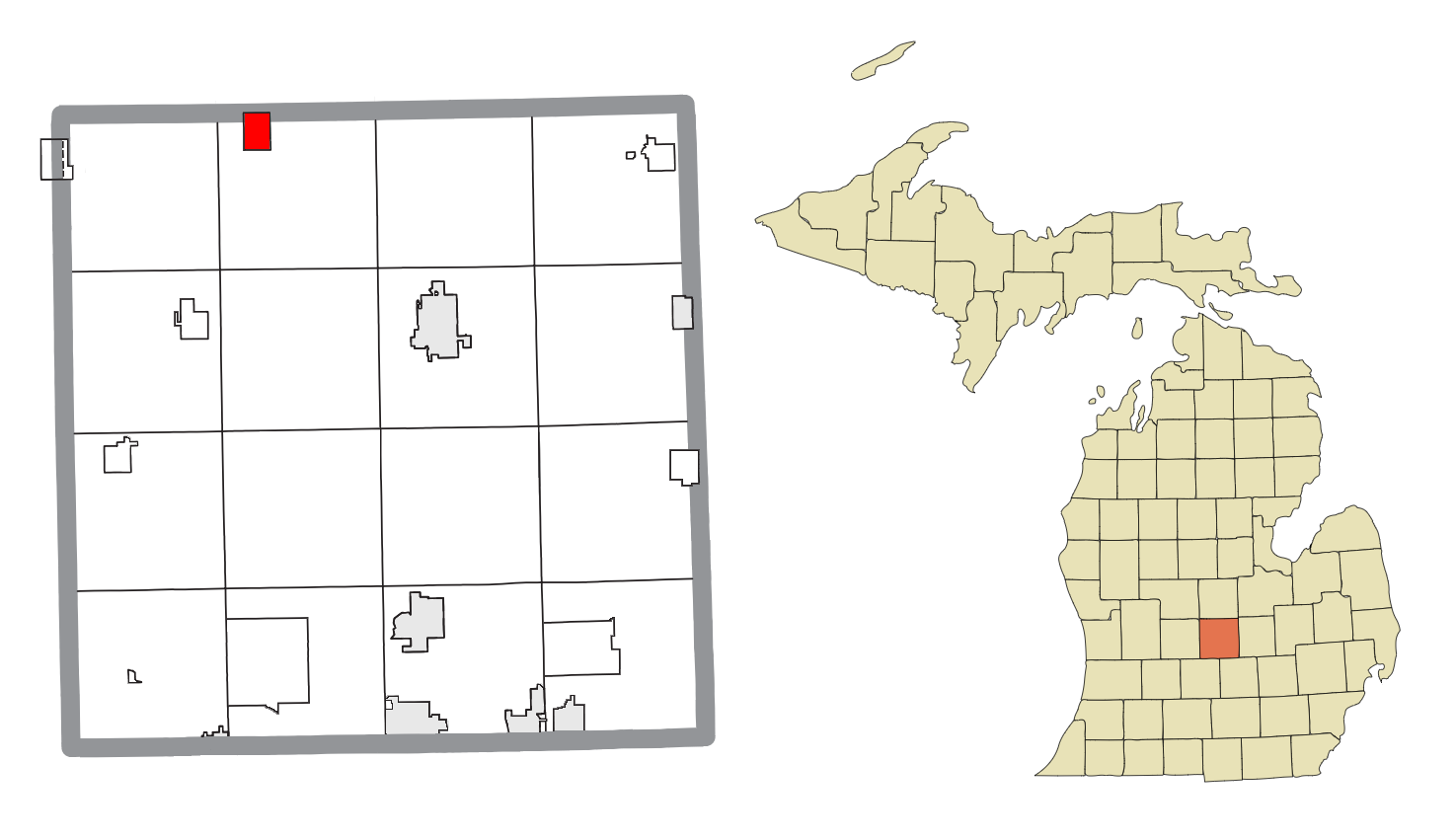
- Location within Clinton County

- Location within the state of Michigan Location within the United States
- Coordinates: 43°06′28″N 84°41′23″W
- Country: United States
- State: Michigan
- County: Clinton
- Township: Essex
- Settled: 1852
- Incorporated: 1881

Government
  - Type: Village council
  - President: William Schmidt
  - Clerk: Sharon Fitzpatrick

Area
  - Total: 1.42 sq mi (3.69 km^{2})
  - Land: 1.37 sq mi (3.54 km^{2})
  - Water: 0.058 sq mi (0.15 km^{2})
- Elevation: 666 ft (203 m)

Population (2020)
  - Total: 573
  - Density: 419.3/sq mi (161.91/km^{2})
- Time zone: UTC-5 (Eastern (EST))
  - Summer (DST): UTC-4 (EDT)
- ZIP code(s): 48853
- Area code: 989
- FIPS code: 26-51200
- GNIS feature ID: 2399248
- Website: Official website

Maple Rapids is a village in Clinton County in the U.S. state of Michigan. As of the 2020 census, Maple Rapids had a population of 573. The village is located in Essex Township about 10 miles (16.1 km) northwest of St. Johns. A portion of the village is within the Maple River State Game Area.

== History ==
In the early 19th-century Maple Rapids was a site where Maketoquit and his large band of Ottawa processed maple sugar, although their main base was further east in modern Shiawassee County, Michigan.

The community was named after the rapids on the Maple River by George Campau, (brother of Louis, founder of Grand Rapids), in 1826 when he built a trading post here. In 1852, William Hewitt built a dam, a sawmill and a store, platted the land and became the first postmaster. The town was incorporated as a village in 1881 during the lumber boom.

== Geography ==
According to the U.S. Census Bureau, the village has a total area of 1.42 square miles (3.68 km^{2}), of which 1.36 square miles (3.52 km^{2}) is land and 0.06 square miles (0.16 km^{2}) (4.23%) is water.

== Demographics ==
Historical population
Census	Pop.	Note	%±
1880	605		—
1890	533		−11.9%
1900	579		8.6%
1910	529		−8.6%
1920	466		−11.9%
1930	476		2.1%
1940	580		21.8%
1950	645		11.2%
1960	683		5.9%
1970	683		0.0%
1980	683		0.0%
1990	680		−0.4%
2000	643		−5.4%
2010	672		4.5%
2020	573		−14.7%
U.S. Decennial Census

=== 2010 census ===
As of the census of 2010, there were 672 people, 251 households, and 186 families residing in the village. The population density was 494.1 inhabitants per square mile (190.8/km^{2}). There were 277 housing units at an average density of 203.7 per square mile (78.6/km^{2}). The racial makeup of the village was 97.5% White, 0.1% African American, 0.1% Native American, 0.6% Asian, and 1.6% from two or more races. Hispanic or Latino of any race were 1.5% of the population.

There were 251 households, of which 41.0% had children under the age of 18 living with them, 55.4% were married couples living together, 13.9% had a female householder with no husband present, 4.8% had a male householder with no wife present, and 25.9% were non-families. 20.3% of all households were made up of individuals, and 9.6% had someone living alone who was 65 years of age or older. The average household size was 2.68 and the average family size was 3.06.

The median age in the village was 36.7 years. 27.8% of residents were under the age of 18; 9.7% were between the ages of 18 and 24; 23.9% were from 25 to 44; 26.5% were from 45 to 64; and 12.2% were 65 years of age or older. The gender makeup of the village was 51.0% male and 49.0% female.

=== 2000 census ===
As of the census of 2000, there were 643 people, 246 households, and 175 families residing in the village. The population density was 456.0 inhabitants per square mile (176.1/km^{2}). There were 262 housing units at an average density of 185.8 per square mile (71.7/km^{2}). The racial makeup of the village was 99.22% White, 0.31% Native American, 0.31% from other races, and 0.16% from two or more races. Hispanic or Latino of any race were 0.47% of the population.

There were 246 households, out of which 36.2% had children under the age of 18 living with them, 55.7% were married couples living together, 11.4% had a female householder with no husband present, and 28.5% were non-families. 24.4% of all households were made up of individuals, and 11.8% had someone living alone who was 65 years of age or older. The average household size was 2.61 and the average family size was 3.09.

In the village, the population was spread out, with 28.9% under the age of 18, 7.6% from 18 to 24, 30.9% from 25 to 44, 21.6% from 45 to 64, and 10.9% who were 65 years of age or older. The median age was 34 years. For every 100 females, there were 98.5 males. For every 100 females age 18 and over, there were 82.8 males.

The median income for a household in the village was $33,036, and the median income for a family was $40,625. Males had a median income of $34,063 versus $23,333 for females. The per capita income for the village was $14,190. About 13.0% of families and 14.6% of the population were below the poverty line, including 18.7% of those under age 18 and 16.7% of those age 65 or over.

== Images ==
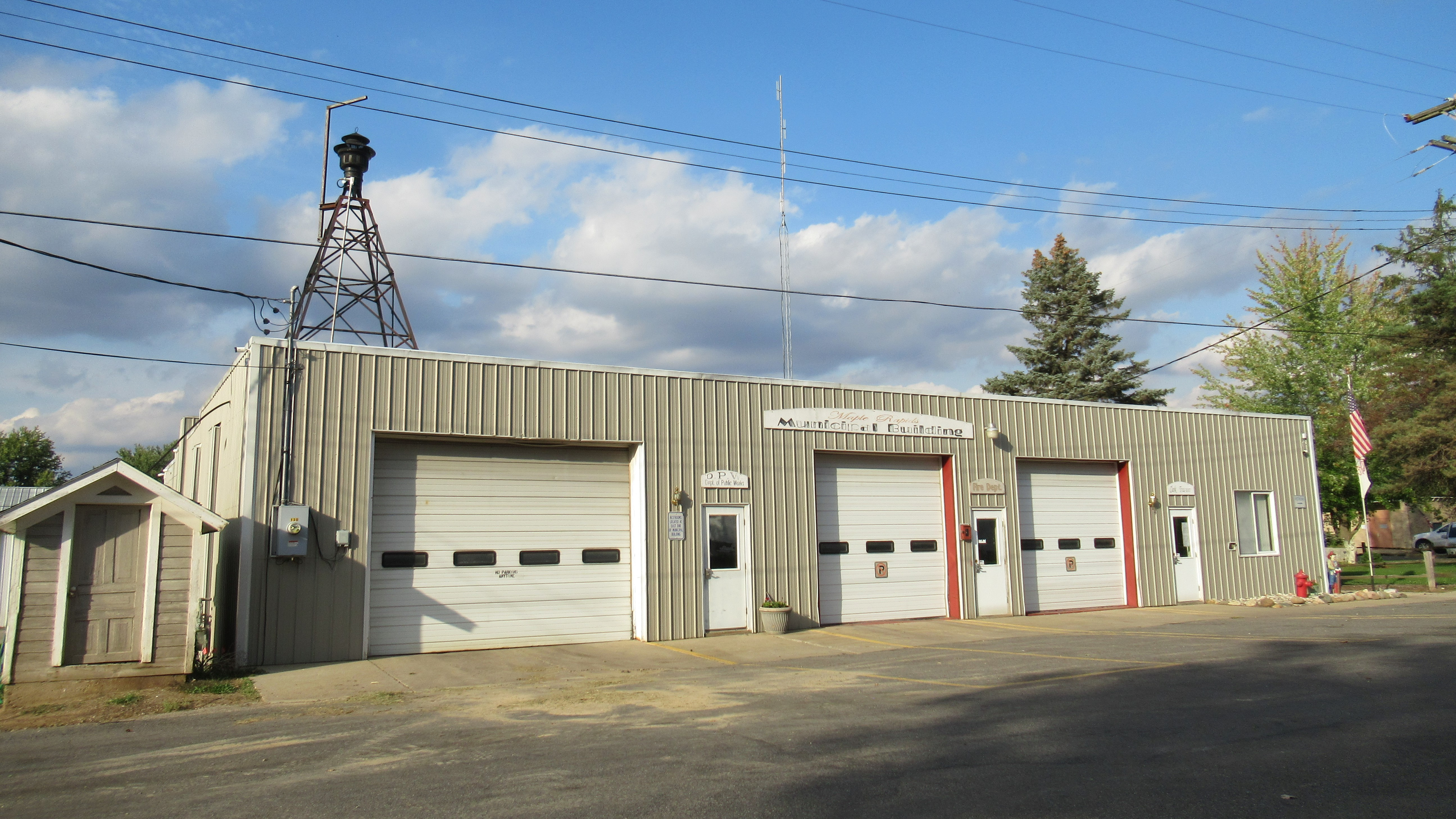
Maple Rapids Municipal Building

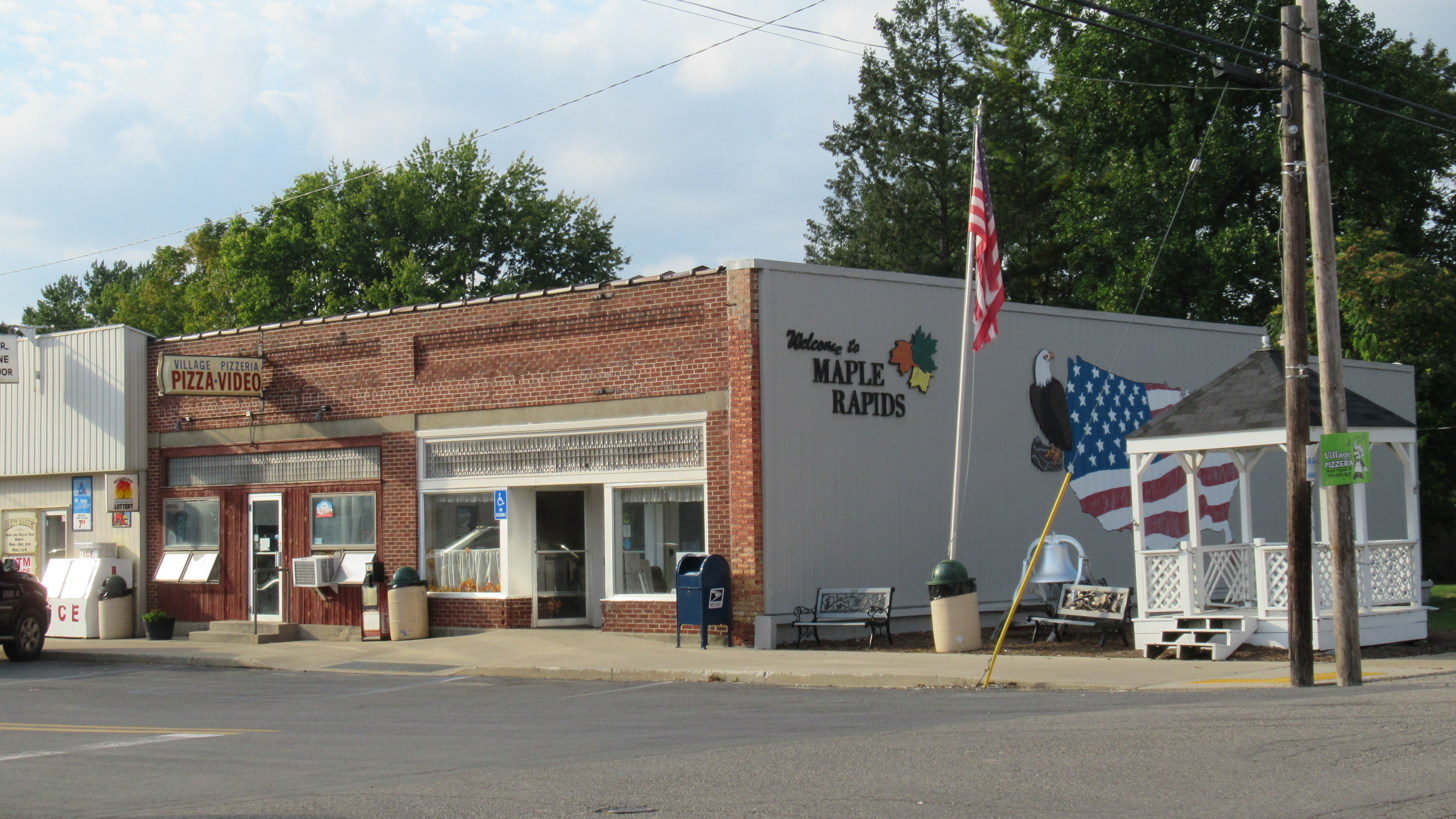
U.S. Post Office in Maple Rapids

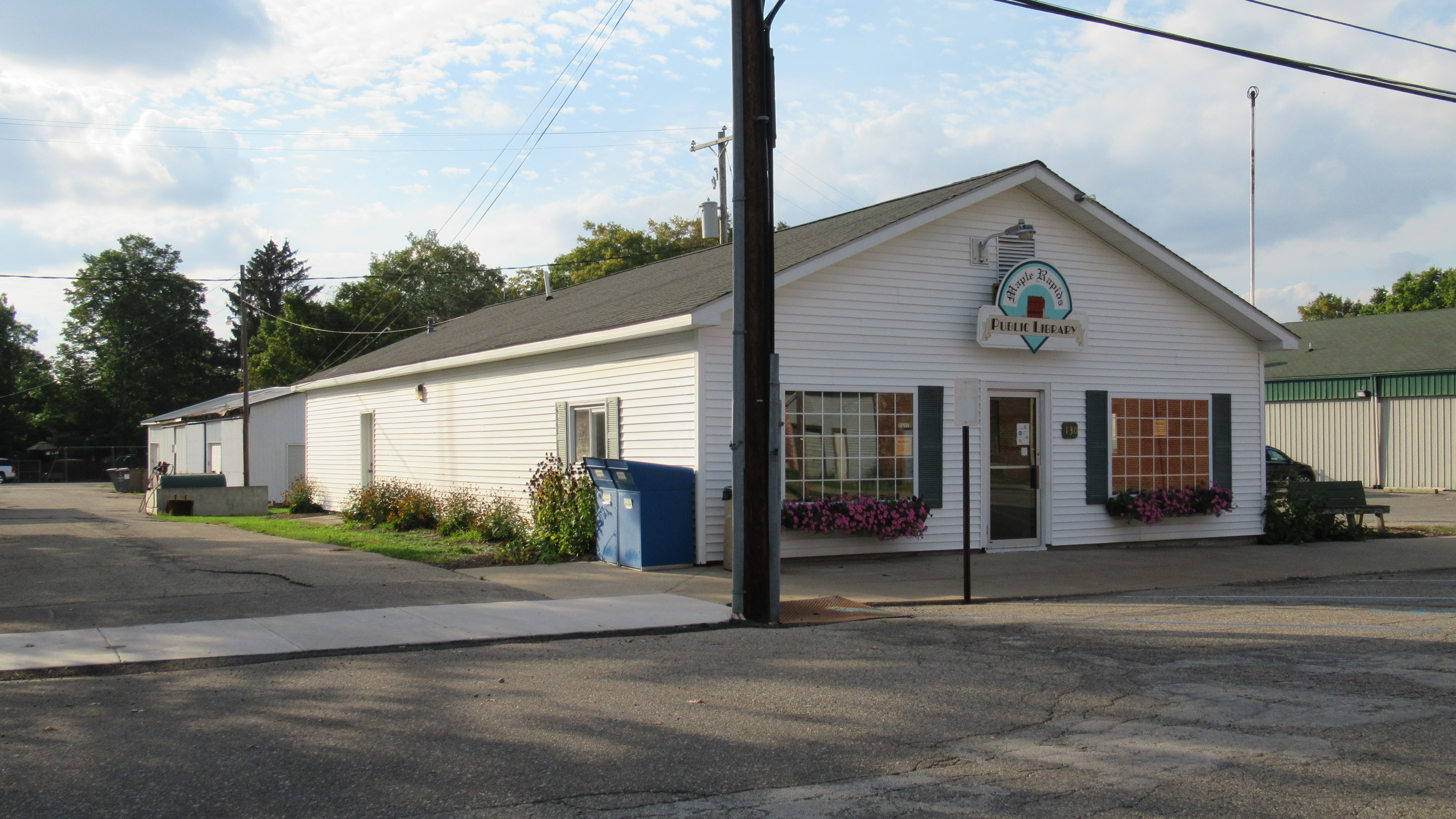
Maple Rapids Public Library
