= Hubbardston, Michigan =

- Village
- Location of Hubbardston, Michigan
- Coordinates: 43°05′39″N 84°50′31″W
- Country: United States
- State: Michigan
- Counties: Ionia, Clinton

Area
  - Total: 1.53 sq mi (3.96 km^{2})
  - Land: 1.45 sq mi (3.76 km^{2})
  - Water: 0.073 sq mi (0.19 km^{2})
- Elevation: 712 ft (217 m)

Population (2020)
  - Total: 369
  - Density: 254.0/sq mi (98.07/km^{2})
- Time zone: UTC-5 (Eastern (EST))
  - Summer (DST): UTC-4 (EDT)
- ZIP code: 48845
- Area code: 989
- FIPS code: 26-39660
- GNIS feature ID: 2398553
- Website: https://www.villageofhubbardston.gov/

Hubbardston is a village in the U.S. state of Michigan. It is mostly in North Plains Township in Ionia County, and partially in Lebanon Township in Clinton County. As of the 2020 census, Hubbardston had a population of 369.

== Geography ==
According to the United States Census Bureau, the Hubbardston has an area of 1.62 square miles (4.20 km^{2}), of which 1.54 square miles (3.99 km^{2}) is land and 0.08 square miles (0.21 km^{2}) is water.

== Demographics ==
Historical population
Census	Pop.	Note	%±
1900	450		—
1910	450		0.0%
1920	368		−18.2%
1930	344		−6.5%
1940	391		13.7%
1950	335		−14.3%
1960	381		13.7%
1970	403		5.8%
1980	421		4.5%
1990	404		−4.0%
2000	394		−2.5%
2010	395		0.3%
2020	369		−6.6%
U.S. Decennial Census

=== 2010 census ===
As of the 2010 census, Hubbardston had 395 people, 136 households, and 107 families. Its population density was 256.5 inhabitants per square mile (99.0/km^{2}). There were 148 housing units at an average density of 96.1 per square mile (37.1/km^{2}). The racial makeup of the village was 97.2% White, 0.3% African American, 0.3% Asian, 1.5% from other races, and 0.8% from two or more races. Hispanic or Latino of any race were 4.3% of the population.

Of its 136 households, 33.1% had children under the age of 18; 55.9% were married couples living together; 14.7% had a female householder with no husband present; 8.1% had a male householder with no wife present; and 21.3% were non-families. 19.9% of households were people living alone; of these, 5.9% were 65 years of age or older. The average household size was 2.69 and the average family size was 2.87.

The village's median age was 41.8 years. 23% of residents were under the age of 18; 8.9% were 18–24; 24.1% were 25–44; 29.1% were 45–64; and 14.9% were 65 or older. 50.9% were male and 49.1% female.

=== 2000 census ===
As of the census of 2000, there were 394 people, 130 households, and 99 families residing in the village. The population density was 250.2 inhabitants per square mile (96.6/km^{2}). There were 139 housing units at an average density of 88.3 per square mile (34.1/km^{2}). The racial makeup of the village was 98.22% White, 1.02% Native American, and 0.76% from two or more races. Hispanic or Latino of any race were 0.76% of the population.

There were 130 households, out of which 36.9% had children under the age of 18 living with them, 58.5% were married couples living together, 10.8% had a female householder with no husband present, and 23.8% were non-families. 13.8% of all households were made up of individuals, and 4.6% had someone living alone who was 65 years of age or older. The average household size was 2.84 and the average family size was 3.15.

In the village, the population was spread out, with 26.6% under the age of 18, 7.4% from 18 to 24, 28.4% from 25 to 44, 24.6% from 45 to 64, and 12.9% who were 65 years of age or older. The median age was 36 years. For every 100 females, there were 96.0 males. For every 100 females age 18 and over, there were 97.9 males.

The median income for a household in the village was $36,458, and the median income for a family was $38,750. Males had a median income of $34,688 versus $21,500 for females. The per capita income for the village was $12,690. About 8.8% of families and 11.5% of the population were below the poverty line, including 13.2% of those under age 18 and 5.8% of those age 65 or over.

== Notable people ==
- Patrick Roger Cleary (1858–1948), founder of Cleary University, educated in Hubbardstown
- Philip Orin Parmelee (1887–1912), aviation pioneer, born in Hubbardstown
- Leonard Read (1898–1983), founder of the Foundation for Economic Education, born in Hubbardstown
