= North Plains Township, Michigan =

- Township
- Location within Michigan Location within the United States
- Coordinates: 43°5′1″N 84°53′11″W
- Country: United States
- State: Michigan
- County: Ionia

Area
  - Total: 35.9 sq mi (93.1 km^{2})
  - Land: 35.9 sq mi (93.0 km^{2})
  - Water: 0.077 sq mi (0.2 km^{2})
- Elevation: 771 ft (235 m)

Population (2020)
  - Total: 1,191
  - Density: 33.2/sq mi (12.8/km^{2})
- Time zone: UTC-5 (Eastern (EST))
  - Summer (DST): UTC-4 (EDT)
- FIPS code: 26-58720
- GNIS feature ID: 1626814

North Plains Township is a large civil township of Ionia County in the U.S. state of Michigan. The population was 1,191 at the 2020 census.

== Communities ==
- Hubbardston is a village in the northeast part of the township on the boundary with Lebanon township in Clinton County.
- Matherton is an unincorporated community just south of Hubbardston along the county line at 43°04′06″N 84°50′13″W.

== Geography ==
According to the United States Census Bureau, the township has a total area of 36.0 square miles (93 km^{2}), of which 35.9 square miles (93 km^{2}) is land and 0.1 square miles (0.26 km^{2}) (0.17%) is water.

== Demographics ==
As of the census of 2000, there were 1,366 people, 471 households, and 358 families residing in the township. The population density was 38.1 inhabitants per square mile (14.7/km^{2}). There were 496 housing units at an average density of 13.8 per square mile (5.3/km^{2}). The racial makeup of the township was 97.36% White, 0.07% African American, 0.66% Native American, 0.29% Asian, 0.15% Pacific Islander, 0.15% from other races, and 1.32% from two or more races. Hispanic or Latino of any race were 1.46% of the population.

There were 471 households, out of which 35.0% had children under the age of 18 living with them, 60.3% were married couples living together, 9.3% had a female householder with no husband present, and 23.8% were non-families. 17.2% of all households were made up of individuals, and 6.2% had someone living alone who was 65 years of age or older. The average household size was 2.83 and the average family size was 3.20.

In the township the population was spread out, with 28.3% under the age of 18, 9.2% from 18 to 24, 27.7% from 25 to 44, 25.5% from 45 to 64, and 9.2% who were 65 years of age or older. The median age was 34 years. For every 100 females, there were 105.4 males. For every 100 females age 18 and over, there were 109.2 males.

The median income for a household in the township was $39,833, and the median income for a family was $45,500. Males had a median income of $36,012 versus $22,000 for females. The per capita income for the township was $15,946. About 6.8% of families and 11.3% of the population were below the poverty line, including 18.1% of those under age 18 and 4.3% of those age 65 or over.
