= Maple River (Grand River tributary) =

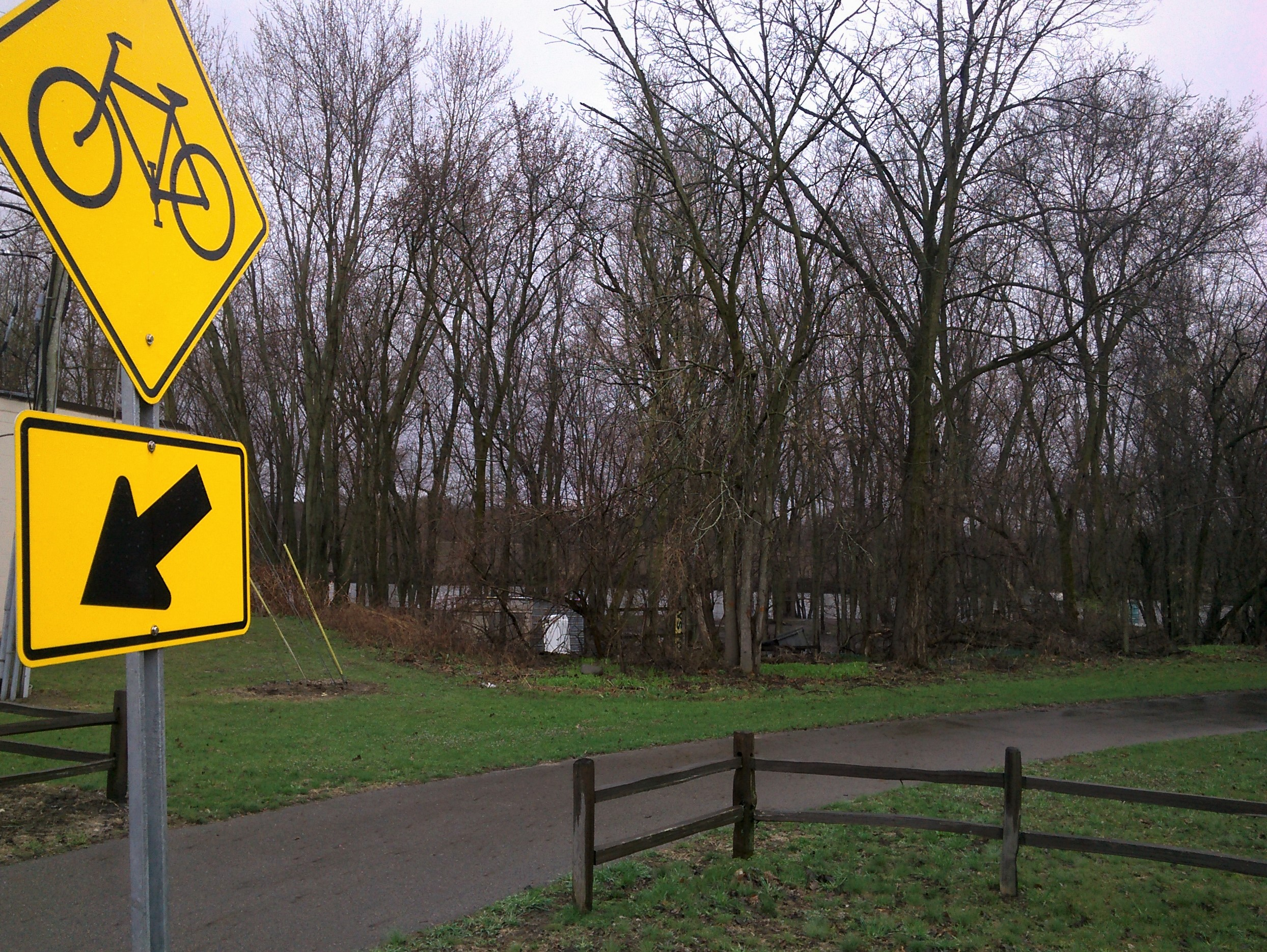

Location
- Country: United States
- State: Michigan
- Counties: Clinton, Ionia, Gratiot, Shiawassee
- Municipalities: Ovid, Elsie, Maple Rapids, Muir

Physical characteristics
- Source
  - location: Shiawassee Township, Shiawassee County
  - coordinates: 42°56′42″N 84°6′53″W
- Mouth: Grand River
  - location: Muir
  - coordinates: 42°59′45″N 84°57′18″W
- Length: 74 mi (119 km)
- Basin size: 944 sq mi (2,440 km^{2})
- Discharge
  - location: mouth
  - average: 753.4 cu ft/s (21.33 m^{3}/s) (estimate)

Basin features
- Tributaries
  - left: Little Maple River
  - right: Pine Creek

The Maple River is a 74.1-mile-long (119.3 km) tributary of the Grand River in the central part of the Lower Peninsula of the U.S. state of Michigan. It rises in Shiawassee Township, Shiawassee County south of the city of Owosso. It flows west through Clinton, Gratiot and Ionia counties, flowing into the Grand River at Muir. Other cities it flows through along the way include Ovid, Elsie and Maple Rapids.

There are 5 major dams along the river and its tributaries: Lake Victoria, Lake Ovid, Elsie, Rainbow and Hubbardston. Portions of the river within Clinton, Gratiot, and Ionia counties are organized as the Maple River State Game Area. The Maple River and Grand River cross and generally run adjacent to the CIS Trail, a multi-use 41-mile gravel pathway on a former railroad bed.
